= Daniel Goldin presidency of Boston University =

Circumstances relating to a Daniel Goldin presidency of Boston University began in the summer of 2003, following the resignation of its eighth president Jon Westling, the Trustees of Boston University voted unanimously to offer the presidency of the university to Daniel S. Goldin, former administrator of NASA under presidents George H. W. Bush, Bill Clinton, and George W. Bush. Goldin was set to take over the job on November 1, 2003, and be officially inaugurated on November 17, though the deal collapsed in the week leading up to his arrival in Boston. The university eventually terminated Goldin's contract at a cost of $1.8 million, and initiated a second search to fill the presidential position, culminating with the inauguration of Robert A. Brown as the university's 10th president on April 27, 2006. (Aram Chobanian, who had served as president ad interim during most of the second search, was recognized by the Board as the 9th president in 2005.)

== Fall of Jon Westling ==
Jon Westling took office as Boston University's 8th president in 1996, succeeding the controversial John Silber, who had served in the office for 25 years. Despite Westling's lack of a PhD, he was Silber's recommendation to the Trustees for the job.

In 2002, after six years in office, the Trustees forced Westling to resign (presumably at the behest of Silber, who had "soured" on him). Silber stepped in to take over presidential duties until a suitable candidate could be found.

== Selection process ==
According to sources the selection process was hurried for a number of reasons. Most notably, Silber had an intense desire to retire permanently, and his critics on the Board of Trustees (led by Jeffrey Katzenberg) similarly wanted to see his influence within the university diminished or eliminated altogether. This emphasis on expeditiousness, combined with the highly unusual presence of Silber in candidate interviews (and on the selection committee in general) caused some Trustees to feel they were not at liberty to voice their concerns.

This led to sloppiness in the interviews and contract negotiations. After only one interview, Goldin was catapulted to the top of the committee's list, due mostly to the personal backing of Silber. Goldin remained the favorite even after he made demands during contract negotiations that would have likely disqualified him from consideration in more ideal circumstances. Among these was his desire to spend much of his time in Malibu, California, where his wife would be living; according to a source Goldin "didn't think he had to be on campus every weekend to be effective." The Trustees agreed to this, and even offered to subsidize this travel with first class airfare as well as a private jet named “BU1”.

Tolerance of such requests was reinforced by the hope that Goldin would use the influence from his former association with NASA to draw in more research funding and grants.

Despite some Trustees' uneasiness over offering Goldin the position, enough votes existed to do so. As a sign of support, the chairman of the board requested that the vote be unanimous. The Trustees capitulated, unanimously deciding in favor of extending Goldin the job offer.

== Vote of no confidence ==
On October 24, a mere week prior to Goldin's arrival on campus, the Trustees gave him a vote of no confidence, and called an emergency meeting to address the matter on October 31.

Initial reports as to the reason for this vote were numerous, but mostly implicated Silber's reputation as a man reluctant to relinquish authority. Goldin reportedly had upset Silber loyalists on the Board by "slighting" Silber with his insistence that he would have no hand in university affairs after his departure. One report even alleged that Goldin had retained a psychiatrist to evaluate Silber in hopes of committing him and minimizing his influence.

The Boston Globe has since reported that Goldin had been planning a purge of BU's upper administration, and had already determined in detail who he thought should remain and who should not. Goldin apparently had intentions to clean house; his plans included the sacking of most of the university's top administrators. The most notable of these were Provost Dennis Berkey and Treasurer Kenneth Condon, both of whom were also finalists for the presidency. This spooked the Trustees, and to a large degree precipitated the no confidence vote.

=== Columbia accident investigation report ===
While unclear how much it may have weighed on the Trustees, in August 2003 NASA's Columbia Accident Investigation Board released Volume I of its report on the causes of the loss of the Space Shuttle Columbia the previous February. This report did not cast Goldin's time at NASA in a flattering light. The report said that "Goldin engineered 'not one or two policy changes, but a torrent of changes. This was not evolutionary change, but radical or discontinuous change,'" and described his tenure as "one of continuous turmoil."

== Termination of contract ==
Goldin caught wind of the vote, and in a memorandum to the Board dated October 27 apologized "if he had unintentionally offended any trustees in discussions over terms of the job." However, he also reiterated his conditions that Silber not remain as Chancellor or member of the Board of Trustees, saying "there can only be one president", and reminding the Board of their contract.

A settlement was eventually reached between the university and Goldin, the details of which were never released but which sources have indicated included a $1.8 million payment to Goldin, in exchange for his abandoning any claims he may have had against BU. Aram Chobanian, Dean of Boston University School of Medicine, was named President Ad interim until a new president could be found.

== Aftermath ==
In the wake of this fiasco, the end of which left BU $1.8 million poorer and saw its reputation in the academic world badly damaged, several actions were taken to improve the image projected to potential presidential candidates, as well as the functioning of the Board itself.

In a mostly symbolic but still very important gesture, the Board requested that Silber vacate his offices in the university's administrative suites at Sherborn Street. It was hoped this would eliminate any concern on the part of candidates that their authority would be undermined.

The Board also accepted the resignations of its chairman and vice-chairman, Christopher Barreca and Dexter Dodge. This, along with proposed checks on Trustee actions such as term limits and plans for an independent oversight body, has signaled an improvement in the management of BU.
