= United States lightship WLV-613 =

Last lightship to mark the Ambrose channel

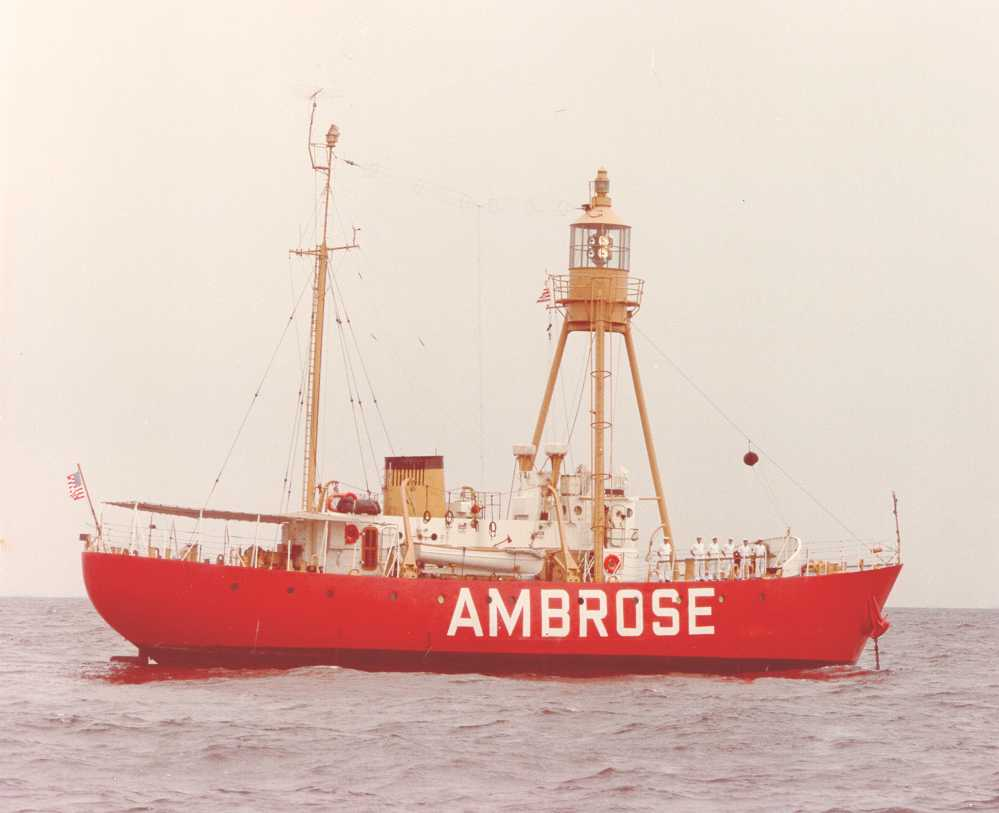
- Lightship WLV-613 as Ambrose lightship

History

United States
- Name: Lightship WLV-613; Serving as: Ambrose lightship (1952—1967); Nantucket lightship (1967-1983 alternating with WLV-612)
- Operator: United States Coast Guard
- Builder: Curtis Bay, Maryland
- Launched: 4 August 1952
- Commissioned: 12 September 1952
- Decommissioned: 20 December 1983
- Fate: Sold to private owners.

General characteristics
- Displacement: 130 tons
- Length: 128 ft (39 m)
- Beam: 30 ft (9.1 m)
- Draft: 11 (3.3 m)
- Propulsion: Detroit - Quad, 550 Hp
- Speed: 9 knots (17 km/h)

The United States Lightship WLV-613 was a lightvessel commissioned in 1952 that became the last lightship to mark the Ambrose Channel. She was replaced by a Texas Tower lightstation on 24 August 1967. (Note: Lightships are given numbers that serve as names, often serving many light stations. When assigned to a station other than with relief duty the name of the station is painted on the vessel's hull for easy identification of the place being marked. They become that station's lightship as in "Ambrose lightship" but the vessels are not renamed. In this case WLV-613 became the Ambrose lightship and then one of the Nantucket lightships.)

The WLV-613 was reassigned as a relief ship on the Massachusetts coastline from 1967 to 1979. After being assigned in 1979 to Nantucket Shoals the lightship alternated with her sister ship, the Lightship WLV-612, relieving each other approximately every 21 days as the Nantucket lightship. The WLV-613 was also the last lightship to mark the Nantucket channel on 20 December 1983. She was decommissioned and retired in 1983.

WLV-613 was berthed at the Wareham Shipyard along Main Street in Wareham, Massachusetts from about 1990 until she was moved to New Bedford, Massachusetts on December 1, 2014. The vessel (now painted as "NANTUCKET") is now privately owned by William B. Golden and Kristen Golden, owners of WLV-612 that also served as the Nantucket station lightship. Currently, she is located in New Bedford, MA but closed to the public.
