= Bill Keating =

American politician (born 1952)

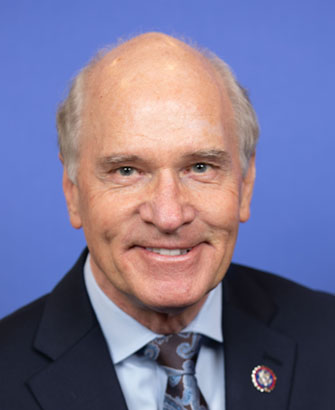
- Official portrait, 2024

Member of the U.S. House of Representatives from Massachusetts
- Incumbent
- Assumed office January 3, 2011
- Preceded by: Bill Delahunt
- Constituency: 10th district (2011–2013); 9th district (2013–present)

District Attorney of Norfolk County
- In office January 3, 1999 – January 3, 2011
- Preceded by: Jeffrey Locke
- Succeeded by: Michael Morrissey

Member of the Massachusetts Senate
- In office January 3, 1985 – January 3, 1999
- Preceded by: Joseph Timilty
- Succeeded by: Jo Ann Sprague
- Constituency: Norfolk and Suffolk district (1985–1989); Norfolk and Bristol district (1989–1995); Norfolk, Bristol, and Plymouth district (1995–1999)

Member of the Massachusetts House of Representatives
- In office January 3, 1977 – January 3, 1985
- Preceded by: Laurence Buxbaum
- Succeeded by: Marjorie Clapprood
- Constituency: 19th Norfolk district (1977–1979); 8th Norfolk district (1979–1985)

Personal details
- Born: William Richard Keating; September 6, 1952 (age 74) Norwood, Massachusetts, U.S.
- Party: Democratic
- Spouse: Tevis Keating
- Children: 2
- Education: Boston College (BA, MBA); Suffolk University (JD)
- Website: House website Campaign website
- Keating's voice Keating supporting the ALERT Act of 2016. Recorded February 29, 2016

William Richard Keating (born September 6, 1952) is an American lawyer and politician serving as the U.S. representative for Massachusetts's 9th congressional district since 2013. A member of the Democratic Party, he first entered Congress in 2011, representing Massachusetts's 10th congressional district until redistricting. Keating's district includes Cape Cod and most of the South Coast. He raised his profile advocating for criminal justice issues in both houses of the Massachusetts General Court from 1977 to 1999 before becoming district attorney of Norfolk County, where he served three terms before being elected to Congress.

Raised in Sharon, Massachusetts, Keating "took a traditional route to politics", attending Boston College and Suffolk University Law School. He was elected to the Massachusetts House of Representatives in 1976 at age 24 and went on to serve in the Massachusetts Senate from 1985 to 1999. He authored numerous bills signed into law concerning taxation, drug crime, and sentencing reform. His attempted overthrow of Senate President William M. Bulger in 1994 was a failure but boosted his local name recognition, which contributed to his success in the 1998 election for DA.

Keating followed the path of former Norfolk County District Attorney Bill Delahunt to the U.S. House of Representatives, winning election in 2010 to represent the 10th congressional district. In 2012, after redistricting drew his home in Quincy into the district of fellow incumbent Stephen Lynch, Keating chose to run in the redrawn 9th district, which combined the eastern portion of his old district with new territory on the South Coast taken from the 4th district long represented by Barney Frank. Keating has been reelected five times from this district. In the 119th Congress, he sits on the House Armed Services Committee and Foreign Affairs Committee. Much of his work has focused on domestic issues central to his district, such as the fishing industry and nuclear safety.

== Early life, education, and legal career ==
Keating was born on September 6, 1952. After graduating from Sharon High School in Sharon, Massachusetts, Keating enrolled at Boston College, from which he received his Bachelor of Arts in 1974, and his Master of Business Administration in 1982. In 1985, Keating earned his Juris Doctor from Suffolk University Law School and passed the bar exam. He later became a partner at the law firm of Keating & Fishman.

=== House of Representatives ===
In 1976, Keating was elected to the Massachusetts House of Representatives from the 19th Norfolk district, where he served for two years. He was then elected from the 8th Norfolk district, serving from 1979 to 1984. He supported George Keverian's successful 1985 effort to overthrow Thomas W. McGee as Speaker of the House. By the end of his House tenure, Keating became vice chairman of the House Criminal Justice Committee.

=== Senate ===
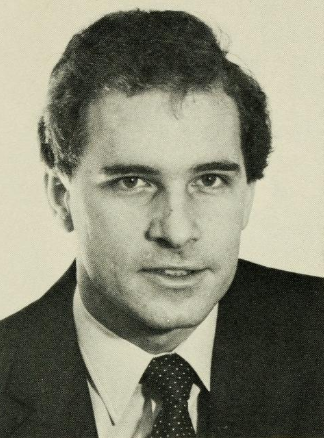
Senator William R. Keating

In 1984, State Senator Joseph F. Timilty resigned his Norfolk and Suffolk seat to pursue a career in private law, and Keating became the only major Democratic contender for the office. In the general election he faced Republican Marion Boch, who promoted a plan for dramatic cuts to legislators' pay and hours, invoking the energy of the Ronald Reagan campaign.

Keating focused his campaign on expanding resources for crime prevention and education, tailoring his message to the Boston constituency he would pick up as a senator. He was elected with about 64% of the vote.

In his first year, Keating was named Senate chairman of the joint Public Safety Committee, where he led the legislative action for a statewide seat belt law pushed by Governor Michael Dukakis. He authored a drug sentencing reform package signed into law in 1988, lowering thresholds for possession charges and establishing new minimum sentences, including a one-year minimum sentence for first-time possession of cocaine or PCP "with intent to distribute". The latter provision was widely derided by criminal justice authorities as excessively strict and vaguely worded.

Following the 1987 Dorchester killings on August 30, which were perpetrated by Vietnamese citizen and American resident Minh Hoang Le against his own family, Keating would push for restrictions on rifle ownership by foreign nationals (ownership of handguns by foreign nationals were already banned). In response to criticisms of the bill, which he dubbed the Alien Gun Permit Bill, he argued that the critics lived only in areas without "large alien population[s]." The bill passed the State Senate in June 1988, but it ultimately died on the order paper before it was introduced in the House. Keating would continue to push for the bill as late as 1994.

Redistricting eventually placed Keating in the Norfolk and Bristol seat (1989–1994). As a vice chairman of the joint Criminal Justice Committee, he was a lead author of a 1991 sentencing reform bill, signed into law by Governor William Weld, that made it easier to try juveniles as adults and pass harsher sentences in the case of major crimes, especially murder. "What is occurring is a shift away from the rehabilitative stance to a focus on the seriousness of the crime committed by the juvenile", Keating said. In 1992, as co-chairman of the Taxation Committee, he successfully pushed a proposal to phase out the Massachusetts estate tax.

In 1994, Keating led a group of politicians in a failed attempt to remove state Senate President William Bulger from his position. Keating sought to reform the Senate rules to greatly reduce the president's power. Bulger, who had held the Senate gavel for 15 years, exerted strict control over the body's operations, but was gradually losing his power base, with crops of Democratic freshmen replacing his longtime allies. Keating's campaign failed, but he said during his 2010 election campaign: "The thought that I took on the most powerful person in Massachusetts, risking my whole career, a member of my own party, is something that is resonating in this campaign, that helps define me as independent."

Further redistricting landed Keating in the Norfolk, Bristol, and Plymouth district from 1995 to 1998. During his Senate tenure, he served as chairman of the Judiciary Committee, chairman of the Committee on Taxation, chairman of the Committee on Public Safety, chairman of the Steering and Policy Committee, and vice chairman of the Committee on Criminal Justice.

== District attorney ==
Speculation emerged in early 1997 that Keating was planning a run for district attorney (DA) of Norfolk County. He faced two former Norfolk assistant DAs, John J. Corrigan and William P. O'Donnell, in the Democratic primary. Keating, whose name recognition was boosted by the attempted Bulger coup, presented his work on public safety, criminal justice, and judiciary committees as a strength.

After winning the Democratic nomination, Keating faced incumbent DA Jeffrey A. Locke in the November 1998 general election. A Republican, Locke had been appointed to the position by Governor Weld the previous year after Bill Delahunt resigned. With years of experience as a prosecutor, Locke portrayed Keating as a career politician and echoed his primary opponents' criticism of his experience. Keating highlighted a range of endorsements from police organizations, and from Delahunt, as evidence of his criminal justice qualifications. Aided by a Democratic-leaning electorate, Keating won the election with around 55% of the vote.

In his first year, Keating founded the Norfolk Anti-Crime Council, a 35-member forum for judicial officers, police, and other local parties to discuss and coordinate anti-crime strategies. He established a pilot program for a drug court under Quincy District Court, which would provide an alternative sentencing pathway for nonviolent drug offenders, in an effort to reduce court backlogs and lower recidivism rates. He also expanded his office's juvenile crime unit. In 2000, he laid the groundwork for the Norfolk Country Children's Advocacy Center, based on similar programs in Middlesex and Suffolk counties, and it was fully established the next year. Keating's office also began an anti-bullying program in 2001.

In 2002, Keating's office was the first in Massachusetts to win a murder conviction in a case that lacked a victim's body.

In advance of the 2002 elections, he was seen as a likely contender to succeed the deceased Joe Moakley in the U.S. House of Representatives, but he opted to run for a second term as DA instead, and was unopposed for reelection. He won a third term, still unopposed, in 2006.

== U.S. House of Representatives ==
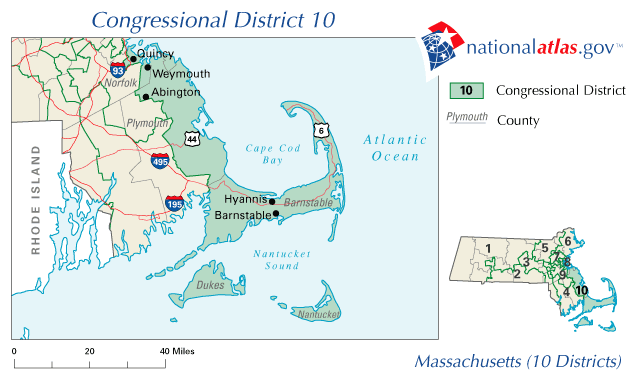
Massachusetts's 10th congressional district, during Keating's tenure as its Representative. The district contained all of Cape Cod, as well as much of the South Shore.

=== Elections ===
With incumbent U.S. Representative Bill Delahunt choosing to retire, Keating declared his candidacy in the 2010 congressional election. In order to run for Delahunt's 10th district seat, Keating moved from his longtime home in Sharon (in the neighboring 4th district) to a rental property in Quincy.

On September 14, Keating won the Democratic primary against State Senator Robert O'Leary. In the general election, he faced Republican State Representative Jeff Perry. In the wake of the Tea Party movement and the election of Republican U.S. Senator Scott Brown, the campaign was unusually close for a modern Massachusetts race, which would normally skew heavily Democratic. Keating's campaign largely focused on a 1991 incident during Perry's tenure as a police sergeant in which a teenage girl had been illegally strip-searched by another officer while Perry was on the scene. The Democratic Congressional Campaign Committee ran a widely aired advertisement highlighting the incident and challenging Perry's character. Keating won the November 2 election with 47% of the vote to Perry's 42%, with two independents receiving the remainder.

During his first term in the House, Keating represented a district that served much of the South Shore, part of the South Coast, and all of Cape Cod. With the state poised to lose a congressional seat after the 2010 census, lawmakers released a redistricting plan in November 2011 in which Keating's home in Quincy was drawn into the neighboring 8th district, represented by Stephen Lynch. Under the plan, nearly all of Keating's base in the South Shore was drawn into Lynch's South Boston-based district. Most of the southern portion of Keating's old district, including his summer home in Bourne on Cape Cod, was combined with territory centered on the South Coast cities of New Bedford and Fall River to create the new 9th district. Rather than challenge Lynch in the Democratic primary, Keating chose to run in the 9th, claiming his summer home as his residence in the district. Keating defeated Bristol County District Attorney Samuel Sutter in the September 6 Democratic primary, and in November 2012 defeated Republican nominee Christopher Sheldon to win a second term.

=== Tenure ===
Keating is a member of the New Democrat Coalition, the House Baltic Caucus, the Congressional Arts Caucus and the U.S.–Japan Caucus.

==== Economic issues and budget ====
Issues specific to his South Coast and Cape Cod–based district, such as maritime policy, have been a major focus of Keating's work. In June 2012, he organized the Federal Fishing Advisory Board, a body to research and address fisheries management concerns between lawmakers and industry stakeholders. Also in 2012, he and other Massachusetts representatives pushed the Department of Commerce to issue a federal disaster declaration for fisheries in the northeastern U.S., which would open up the opportunity for financial aid. In the wake of Hurricane Sandy, Keating proposed to redirect $111 million of relief funding to fisheries throughout the country, but the House Rules Committee did not adopt the proposal.

When the Nuclear Regulatory Commission considered a 20-year contract extension for the Pilgrim Nuclear Generating Station in Plymouth in mid-2012, Keating repeatedly took to the press. He at first declined to take a position on the plant's reauthorization, saying, "I wouldn't be the right person to ask, and that's why we have regulatory authorities and people with expertise to deal with that." When the commission voted to renew the license, Keating joined other Massachusetts politicians in deriding the decision as premature.

During a labor strike later in the year, Keating joined U.S. Representative Ed Markey in challenging the qualifications of the plant's replacement workers.

Along with U.S. Senator John Kerry, Keating helped to finalize the cleanup and sale of portions of a defunct naval air base in South Weymouth to private developers. The deal, reached in November 2011, was a linchpin for the SouthField development project.

Keating has stressed his opposition to Social Security reductions such as raising the retirement age or privatizing the program, and supported a cost-of-living adjustment the Social Security Administration announced in 2011.

In 2011, Keating had a 100% rating from the American Federation of Labor and Congress of Industrial Organizations (AFL–CIO), backing all 29 endorsed bills. In 2012, Keating voted for 10 of 12 AFL-CIO backed bills, with the two opposing votes dealing with small business startups and swap dealer exclusions.

Overall, Keating has supported 95% of AFL-CIO-endorsed legislation.

==== Foreign affairs and defense ====
Keating sits on the House Foreign Affairs Committee, where he is the ranking member of the Europe, Eurasia and Emerging Threats Subcommittee, and formerly served on the House Homeland Security Committee. He joined a Congressional delegation to Afghanistan, Pakistan, and Iraq, shortly after the 2011 execution of Osama bin Laden.

After TSA officers in Boston were accused of racial profiling in 2012, Keating requested a Homeland Security Committee hearing into the accusations.

==== Social issues ====
In 2011, Keating founded a Women's Advisory Board for the 10th congressional district, in hopes of gaining insight into how best to serve the women in the 10th district. From October 18 to 21, 2011, he hosted "Women's Week" in the district, with events focusing on topics such as breast cancer awareness, domestic violence, and female entrepreneurship.

Keating is pro-choice, and during his tenure in the House has voted against the Protect Life Act and the No Taxpayer Funding for Abortion Act.

In 2010, Keating received a rating of 0% from Massachusetts Citizens for Life. In 1997, he was rated 100% by NARAL Pro-Choice Massachusetts. The same year, he received a 100% rating from the Massachusetts National Organization for Women.

Keating is a supporter of gay rights. He supported ending the Don't Ask Don't Tell policy and has promised to push nationwide anti-discrimination laws and marriage rights for gays and lesbians. In July 2011, he recorded a video supporting LGBT youth in Massachusetts in conjunction with other members of Massachusetts's congressional delegation and the It Gets Better Project. During a March 2025 hearing of the Europe subcommittee, of which he was the ranking Democratic member, Keating verbally sparred with the Republican subcommittee chairman, Keith Self, after Self referred to freshman Democratic Representative Sarah McBride, the House's first elected transgender member, as "Mr. McBride". Self adjourned the hearing following Keating's objections. During the incident, Keating said to Self, "Mr. Chairman, you are out of order. Have you no decency? I have come to know you a little bit, but this is not decent". Self attempted to continue the meeting, but Keating interjected, saying "We will not continue it with me unless you introduce a duly elected representative (pointing to McBride) the right way". This is when Self adjourned the meeting.

During his 2010 House campaign, Keating promised to increase federal firearm regulations. His proposed changes included closing a loophole that allows people on the FBI Terrorist Watch List to buy guns and requiring child safety trigger locks on all guns. He voted against a bill to require any state offering right-to-carry permits to recognize such permits issued in other states.

=== Legislation ===
Keating and Representative Aaron Schock jointly introduced the Equitable Access to Care and Health Act (H.R. 1814; 113th Congress) on April 29, 2013. The bill would amend the Internal Revenue Code with respect to minimum essential health care coverage requirements added by the Patient Protection and Affordable Care Act, to allow an additional religious exemption from such requirements for people whose sincerely held religious beliefs would cause them to object to medical health care provided under such coverage. Individuals could file an affidavit to get this exemption, but would lose the exemption if they went on to later use healthcare. Schock and Keating wrote a letter in support of their bill, saying, "we believe the EACH Act balances a respect for religious diversity against the need to prevent fraud and abuse."

=== Committee assignments ===
- Committee on Armed Services
  - Subcommittee on Cyber, Information Technologies, and Innovation
  - Subcommittee on Intelligence and Special Operations
- Committee on Foreign Affairs
  - Subcommittee on Europe (Ranking Member)
  - Subcommittee on Indo-Pacific

=== Caucus memberships ===
- Congressional Equality Caucus
- New Democrat Coalition
- Congressional Taiwan Caucus
- Congressional Ukraine Caucus
- Rare Disease Caucus

== Electoral history ==
Electoral history of Bill Keating
Year	Office		Party	Primary			General			Result	Swing	Ref.
Year	Office		Party	Total	%	P.	Total	%	P.	Result	Swing	Ref.
1976	State House	19th Norf.	Democratic	2,625	65.63%	1st	8,547	75.37%	1st	Won	Hold	
1978	State House	8th Norf.	Democratic	4,079	61.18%	1st	10,203	73.85%	1st	Won	Hold	
1980	State House	8th Norf.	Democratic	N/A			12,905	71.25%	1st	Won	Hold	
1982	State House	8th Norf.	Democratic	7,805	100%	1st	12,328	100%	1st	Won	Hold	
1984	State Senate	Norfolk & Suffolk	Democratic	17,432	86.07%	1st	40,665	71.56%	1st	Won	Hold	
1986	State Senate	Norfolk & Suffolk	Democratic	12,908	86.82%	1st	30,778	100%	1st	Won	Hold	
1988	State Senate	Norfolk & Bristol	Democratic	8,258	99.85%	1st	51,948	73.53%	1st	Won	Hold	
1990	State Senate	Norfolk & Bristol	Democratic	22,052	99.80%	1st	41,279	61.18%	1st	Won	Hold	
1992	State Senate	Norfolk & Bristol	Democratic	14,307	99.94%	1st	60,721	99.81%	1st	Won	Hold	
1994	State Senate	NPB	Democratic	8,183	99.88%	1st	40,282	63.72%	1st	Won	Hold	
1996	State Senate	NPB	Democratic	2,921	99.76%	1st	59,215	99.76%	1st	Won	Hold	
1998	Massachusetts; District Attorney	Norfolk; County	Democratic	38,313	48.45%	1st	122,765	54.81%	1st	Won	Gain	
2002	Massachusetts; District Attorney	Norfolk; County	Democratic	71,481	99.82%	1st	184,361	99.45%	1st	Won	Hold	
2006	Massachusetts; District Attorney	Norfolk; County	Democratic	78,452	99.02%	1st	191,805	99.26%	1st	Won	Hold	
2010	U.S. House	10th	Democratic	29,953	50.93%	1st	132,743	46.87%	1st	Won	Hold	
2012	U.S. House	9th	Democratic	31,366	59.08%	1st	212,754	58.71%	1st	Won	Hold	
2014	U.S. House	9th	Democratic	42,716	99.20%	1st	140,413	54.95%	1st	Won	Hold	
2016	U.S. House	9th	Democratic	31,074	99.31%	1st	211,790	55.75%	1st	Won	Hold	
2018	U.S. House	9th	Democratic	50,015	85.27%	1st	192,347	59.38%	1st	Won	Hold	
2020	U.S. House	9th	Democratic	125,608	99.41%	1st	260,262	61.30%	1st	Won	Hold	
2022	U.S. House	9th	Democratic	81,530	99.72%	1st	197,823	59.17%	1st	Won	Hold	
2024	U.S. House	9th	Democratic	71,814	99.62%	1st	251,931	56.44%	1st	Won	Hold	
2026	U.S. House	9th	Democratic	81,847	77.50%	1st	218,204	60.92%	1st	Won	Hold	
Source: Secretary of the Commonwealth of Massachusetts | Election Results

== Personal life ==
Keating and his wife, Tevis, live in Bourne, Massachusetts. They have two adult children. He is Roman Catholic.

Massachusetts House of Representatives
Preceded by Laurence Buxbaum	Member of the Massachusetts House of Representatives from the 19th Norfolk district 1977–1979	Succeeded by Constituency abolished
Preceded by Andrew Card	Member of the Massachusetts House of Representatives from the 8th Norfolk district 1979–1985	Succeeded by Marjorie Clapprood
Massachusetts Senate
Preceded by Joseph F. Timilty	Member of the Massachusetts Senate from the Norfolk and Suffolk district 1985–1989	Succeeded by Marian Walsh
Preceded by Constituency established	Member of the Massachusetts Senate from the Norfolk and Bristol district 1989–1995	Succeeded by Constituency abolished
Preceded by Constituency established	Member of the Massachusetts Senate from the Norfolk, Bristol, and Plymouth district 1995–1999	Succeeded by Jo Ann Sprague
Legal offices
Preceded by Jeffrey Locke	District Attorney of Norfolk County; 1999–2011	Succeeded by Michael W. Morrissey
U.S. House of Representatives
Preceded by Bill Delahunt	Member of the U.S. House of Representatives from Massachusetts's 10th congressional district 2011–2013	Constituency abolished
Preceded by Stephen Lynch	Member of the U.S. House of Representatives from Massachusetts's 9th congressional district 2013–present	Incumbent
U.S. order of precedence (ceremonial)
Preceded by Bill Huizenga	United States representatives by seniority 85th	Succeeded by Mike Kelly
