= 1987 Dorchester killings =

Mass shooting in Boston

- Location: 42°19′7″N 71°3′13″W; 10 Newport Street, Dorchester, Boston, Massachusetts, United States
- Date: August 30, 1987 c. 3:00 p.m. (UTC−04:00)
- Attack type: Mass shooting
- Weapons: 9mm Uzi carbine; .22-caliber rifle
- Deaths: 6 (including the perpetrator)
- Injuries: 2
- Assailant: Minh Hoang Le
- Motive: Revenge

On August 30, 1987, 23-year-old Minh Hoang Le fatally shot five people and injured two others at his family's home at 10 Newport Street in Dorchester, Boston, following a dispute over money that Le had stolen from a relative. Four of the victims were members of his family; after the police arrived at the address approximately 90 minutes following the beginning of the attack, Le shot himself and died.

== Attack ==
Fatalities

- Xuan Phing Le, 48
- Duc H. Huynh, 52
- Thau X. Huynh, 23
- Tru Thi Vo, 26
- Mei N. Gee, 24

At around 8:30 a.m., the perpetrator, Minh Hoang Le, who had stayed at a Marriott hotel in Long Wharf following a trip to New York City, checked out of the hotel before arriving at 10 Newport Street. His aunt, Xuan Phing Le, uncle, Duc H. Huynh, and cousin, Thau X. Huynh, were present. They waited until the remaining family members arrived in order for Le to discuss several issues within the family that centered around two fraudulent withdrawals he had made of $1,800 and $1,500 from Xuan's bank account in 1983 and 1986 respectively: in the latter case, he had used the money to move to a three-decker house with friends. The remaining family members were David Huynh, a cousin; Tri Huynh, David's older brother who worked at the Marriott; Tru Thi Vo, David's sister-in-law who also worked at the Marriott; Phuong Huynh; Vo's three-year-old daughter; and Mei N. Gee, David's girlfriend. They had all arrived by 3:00 p.m., and the meeting began.

Le had been wearing a white trench coat over a suit and tie: this had been done to conceal a disassembled Uzi that he gradually began to assemble while expressing his grievances to his family. When David noticed this, he alerted the other family members, causing them to rush to the front door. Le followed them, killing Xuan and Duc by shooting them in the hallway. Thau, who was sleeping nearby, was killed in her bed; afterward, Le exited the house and chased fleeing members down, killing Vo and Gee. Tri and Phuong were wounded, but survived.

Prior to the shootings, fourteen-year-old DiWanna Salmons, who lived in the neighborhood, had gone to a nearby video store with a friend to return two movies she had rented the previous night. Salmons returned home alone shortly after Le exited the house, seeing Tri, who had crossed the road and had been wounded in front of her house, as well as Phuong, who was lying injured on the other side. Her mother, Frances, did not respond to the doorbell as she had fallen asleep watching television: Le began to chase after her as he noticed her trying to get to the back door, attempting to shoot her in the face, though he had run out of bullets. When Salmons entered the house, she woke Frances up, who proceeded to call 911.

Following the killings, Le returned to the house and retreated to the living room. A group of seven special operations officers from the Boston Police Department, led by Deputy Superintendent Robert E. O'Toole, would arrive shortly afterward. At around 4:30 p.m., when the building's exits had been secured and a few moments after the officers entered through a back window for a planned confrontation, Le was heard shooting himself in the right temple with the Uzi, committing suicide.

== Perpetrator ==
Minh Hoang Le (c. 1963−1964 − August 30, 1987) was born and raised in Saigon (now known as Ho Chi Minh City), South Vietnam, as the youngest of seven children. Growing up during the Vietnam War and becoming desensitized to the resulting "everyday" death around him, he was separated from much of his family during the Fall of Saigon in 1975, living in a refugee camp in Southeast Asia with Xuan for six years. Eventually, with the help of a sponsorship of the International Rescue Committee, as well as other family members, including Duc, who had arrived in October 1980, he and Xuan were able to arrive in San Francisco on March 11, 1981. After moving in with the family at 10 Newport Street, Le would be enrolled in Brighton High School, which had a bilingual program for Vietnamese students. During this time, he would befriend several students involved in local gang activity: his family suspected that this was a trauma response to the war, as well as being cut off from his culture for so long.

Following his graduation from high school, Le would enroll in a two-year engineering program at the University of Massachusetts in the summer of 1983: the program was part of a larger series of programs meant to help disadvantaged people who would later pursue four-year degrees. Le's academic advisor, Hao Ngo, noticed that he progressed far more slowly than most students enrolled in the program, and from 1985 onward, would begin to actively avoid Ngo. In January 1986, Le would formally withdraw from the university. During this time period, he would also work at various menial jobs in the hotel industry alongside relatives: the last one he had worked at prior to the killings was the Marriott in Long Wharf, where he had stayed the previous night and where Tri and Vo worked. Despite his low pay, he was able to take various trips to Salt Lake City, Ottawa, and New York City, where various relatives (including a brother in Ottawa) lived.

In May 1986, Le made two phone calls to the Boston Police Department and Federal Bureau of Investigation (FBI), informing them of an alleged plot by seven Libyan terrorists to assassinate then-U.S. President Ronald Reagan; Le offered to infiltrate the group on their behalf to foil it. The police and FBI complaints were both dismissed as preposterous, though not before being referred to the Secret Service. The Secret Service took the opportunity to question Le that month during a trip he had taken to Washington D.C. after he had committed a relatively minor offense, ultimately drawing similar conclusions and determining that there was no such threat to the President's life. None of these notes, however, were disclosed to the Massachusetts Department of Public Safety when he applied for a hunting rifle permit in June 1987, as he had never been charged with a crime: while Massachusetts law bans foreign nationals from owning handguns, it does allow for rifle ownership.

== Legacy ==
Following the killings, then-State Senator Bill Keating would introduce the Alien Gun Permit Bill on November 2, 1987. The bill aimed to require resident aliens (as legally defined) to provide photo identification for obtaining rifle permits, as well as requiring them to have resided in the United States for at least one year and in Massachusetts for at least 60 days prior to applying for one. The bill also shifted the responsibility of this procedure from the Massachusetts Department of Public Safety to local police forces, as well as tasking them to conduct international criminal records checks. Police chiefs were divided: while the Massachusetts Chiefs of Police Association endorsed the bill, it was opposed by officers such as Westwood chief Francis Abbate, who argued that many agencies did not have the necessary resources, especially as it came to checking non-English records. The Gun Owners Action League also opposed the bill, with executive director Michael Yacino viewing it as overly burdensome on foreign nationals and characterizing it as a "knee-jerk reaction" to the killings. In response to these criticisms, Keating accused critics of not living in areas with "large alien population[s]." While the bill passed the State Senate in June 1988, it ultimately died on the order paper; as late as 1994, Keating (who left the Senate in 1999 to become the District Attorney of Norfolk County) would continue to reintroduce the bill at the opening of a new session, though the law remains unchanged to this day.
