= Mary L. Padula =

American politician

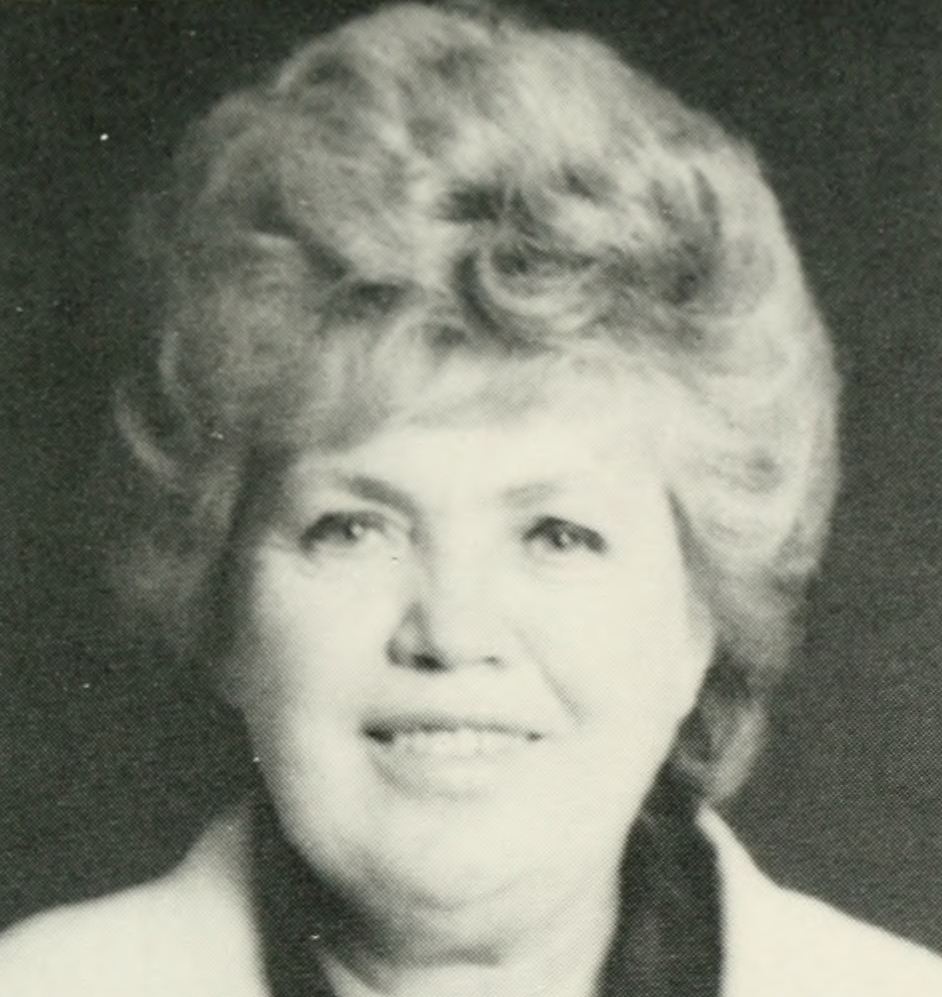

Massachusetts Secretary of Housing & Community Development
- In office 1991–1996
- Preceded by: Steven Pierce
- Succeeded by: Position eliminated

Second Worcester and Middlesex District
- In office 1983–1991
- Preceded by: Robert A. Hall
- Succeeded by: Robert A. Antonioni

Personal details
- Born: Fitchburg, Massachusetts
- Party: Republican

Mary L. Padula is a former politician who represented the Second Worcester and Middlesex District in the Massachusetts Senate from 1983 to 1991 she also served as Massachusetts' Secretary of Housing & Community Development from 1991 until the post was eliminated in 1996.

Prior to serving the Senate, Padula was the executive secretary for the town of Lunenburg, Massachusetts from 1953 to 1983.

== See also ==
- List of former districts of the Massachusetts Senate
