= 1990 Massachusetts gubernatorial election =

- November 6, 1990
- Turnout: 75.85% ▲18.44
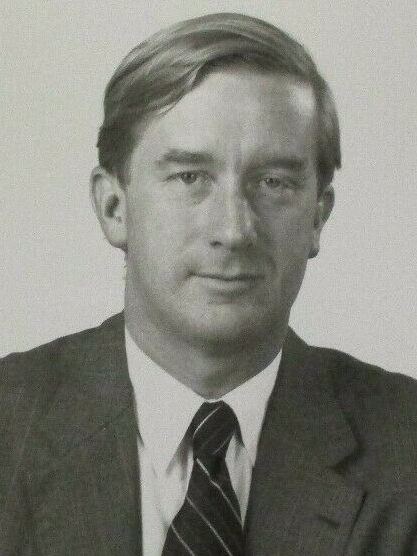

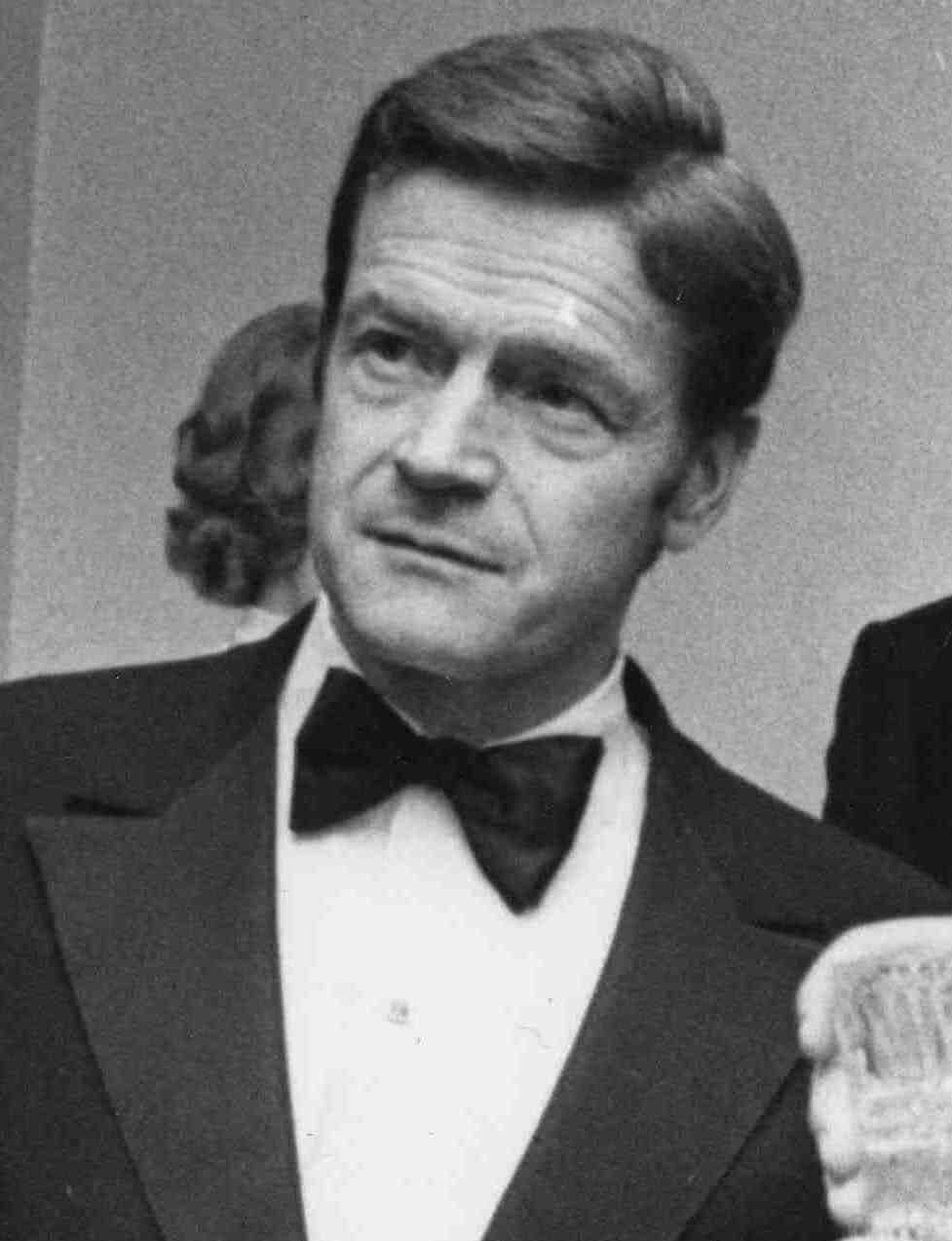
| Nominee | Bill Weld | John Silber |
| Party | Republican | Democratic |
| Running mate | Paul Cellucci | Marjorie Clapprood |
| Popular vote | 1,175,817 | 1,099,878 |
| Percentage | 50.19% | 46.94% |
- Weld: 40–50% 50–60% 60–70% 70–80% Silber: 40–50% 50–60% 60–70% 70–80%
Governor before election
Michael Dukakis
Democratic
Elected Governor
Bill Weld
Republican

The 1990 Massachusetts gubernatorial election was held on November 6, 1990. Incumbent Democratic governor Michael Dukakis declined to seek a fourth term. Republican prosecutor Bill Weld won the open seat, beating Democratic university president John Silber to become the first Republican elected governor of Massachusetts since 1970. This was the first open-seat gubernatorial election in Massachusetts since 1960.

Primary elections were held on September 18 and were marked by record voter turnout. Both candidates won their respective nominations in major political upsets over more established figures, each of whom held the party's official endorsement and large margins over the eventual victors in most opinion polling. Silber defeated former attorney general and lieutenant governor Francis Bellotti, despite polling behind Bellotti for the entire campaign. Weld defeated Steven Pierce, the Republican leader in the Massachusetts House of Representatives. Their victories were immediately labelled a political "revolution" against a major tax increase and the ongoing economic recession.

== Democratic primary ==
=== Governor ===
==== Candidates ====
- Francis Bellotti, former lieutenant governor and attorney general of Massachusetts
- John Silber, president of Boston University

===== Eliminated at convention =====
- John H. Flood, state representative from Canton

===== Withdrew =====
- Evelyn Murphy, incumbent lieutenant governor (endorsed Bellotti)

===== Declined =====
- Michael Dukakis, incumbent governor since 1983 and Democratic nominee for president of the United States in 1988
- Raymond Flynn, mayor of Boston

==== Campaign ====
After Dukakis and Boston mayor Raymond Flynn declined to run, lieutenant governor Evelyn Murphy was the early frontrunner due to strong name recognition and a solid base of support among liberals. In July 1989, she led Francis Bellotti with 42 percent in a Boston Globe poll to 18 percent. However, by November 1989, Bellotti had closed the gap to within 2 percent of Murphy.

In January, Boston University president John Silber entered the race. Silber's campaign for the nomination was marked by a series of caustic, politically incorrect statements which came to be called "Silber shockers." For example, in the context of a discussion on healthcare policy, Silber urged prioritizing care for children over the elderly and terminally ill by saying, "Shakespeare was right when he said 'Ripeness is all.' When you've had a long life and you're ripe, then it's time to go." Columnist George Will defended Silber, arguing that he had been misquoted or misrepresented by his opponents and the media, who had equated this statement with "advocacy for genocide." In reaction to his relationship with the media during the primary, Silber remarked, "Typically, I put forward a statement for examination and then develop evidence and argument toward a conclusion. In the context of a political campaign, I've discovered that the first thing one says—and often it is said to attract attention—is taken as the sound bite and the definitive position of the candidate on a subject. If the candidate makes any effort to enlarge upon that sound bite, he is then accused of having changed his position."

Bellotti ran his first wave of television ads in January and continued to surge, taking the lead in the race, polling 38 percent to 20 percent and 16 percent for Murphy and Silber, respectively. By May, Silber had surpassed Murphy, and a Boston Herald poll found that Bellotti led with 36 percent to 24 percent for Silber and 19 percent for Murphy. The Murphy campaign downplayed the polling by suggesting it was the result of Silber's advertising campaign, which spent $200,000 in two weeks in April.

==== Convention ====
The Democratic Party state convention was held on June 2, 1990, at the Springfield Civic Center. Silber and his supporters made an issue of the 15 percent rule, which requires candidates to receive the support of 15 percent of delegates on the first ballot in order to qualify for the official primary ballot, calling it an "exclusionary" measure. Surveys taken in May suggested that Silber would struggle to reach that threshold despite his popular support, given his heterodox views and support for Bellotti and Murphy from liberals and organized labor, two groups which would dominate the delegate pool.

On the first ballot, Bellotti and Murphy easily qualified for the ballot with 42.9 percent and 37 percent of the vote, respectively. Silber narrowly qualified for the ballot with 15.5 percent of the delegates. On the second ballot, Bellotti won the party endorsement with 51 percent of the vote. State representative John H. Flood was eliminated.

==== Post-convention campaign ====
Murphy's campaign continued its decline post-primary, apparently hurt by the public perception that she was close to the unpopular Dukakis. However, efforts to distance herself from Dukakis backfired. Dukakis twice postponed a trade mission to Europe because Murphy had publicly hinted that she would execute her own economic plan while serving as acting governor. After the incident, Murphy's unfavorable rating rose to 49 percent in a Boston Globe poll from 38 percent one month earlier.

A week before the primary, Evelyn Murphy dropped out of the race and threw her support to Bellotti.

==== Endorsements ====
Silber was endorsed by William Bulger, president of the Massachusetts Senate.

==== Results ====
Despite Murphy's endorsement and a polling lead as high 23 percent in late polls, Bellotti was upset by Silber.

Primary results by municipality

Massachusetts Democratic gubernatorial primary, 1990
| Party | Candidate | Votes | % |
|---|---|---|---|
| Democratic | John Silber | 562,222 | 53.47% |
| Democratic | Francis X. Bellotti | 459,128 | 43.67% |
| Democratic | Evelyn Murphy (withdrawn) | 30,054 | 2.86% |
| Total votes | | 1,051,404 | 100.00% |

The Silber campaign said that exit polling showed that he had fared worst among blacks and women. However, he ran strongly among independents and white men. Polling experts suggested that the major polling miss was the result of participation bias or social-desirability bias, because a large group of voters were reluctant to admit their support for Silber to pollsters after his controversial remarks on blacks, women, and the elderly.

=== Lieutenant governor ===
==== Candidates ====
- Marjorie Clapprood, state representative from Sharon
- William B. Golden, state senator from Weymouth
- Nicholas Paleologos, state representative from Woburn

===== Declined =====
- Evelyn Murphy, incumbent lieutenant governor (to run for governor)

==== Results ====
Clapprood easily won the nomination, defeating her nearest opponent by over 22%.

Massachusetts Democratic lt. gubernatorial primary, 1990
| Party | Candidate | Votes | % |
|---|---|---|---|
| Democratic | Marjorie Clapprood | 498,241 | 52.02% |
| Democratic | William B. Golden | 283,719 | 29.62% |
| Democratic | Nicholas Paleologos | 175,558 | 18.33% |
| Total votes | | 957,518 | 100.00% |

== Republican primary ==
=== Governor ===
==== Candidates ====
- Steven Pierce, state representative from Westfield
- William Weld, former U.S. attorney for the District of Massachusetts

===== Eliminated at convention =====
- Paul W. Cronin, former U.S. representative from Andover

===== Withdrew =====
- Guy Carbone, former commissioner of the Metropolitan District Commission (ran for attorney general)
- Gary Innes, flower shop owner
- Len Umina, resident of Marlborough (ran as an independent)

===== Declined =====
- Paul Cellucci, state senator from Hudson (ran for lieutenant governor)
- Edward J. King, former Democratic governor

==== Campaign ====
At the Republican convention, Pierce received 2,672 votes (52.6%), Weld received 1,845 (36.3%), and Cronin received 563 (11.1%). Cronin was not able to run in the primary because he did not receive the 15% necessary to make the ballot. Pierce received enough votes to have a "supermajority", which made Pierce the officially endorsed candidate of the Republican Party.

During the campaign, Weld attacked Pierce's anti-abortion stance while Pierce claimed that Weld had changed his position on abortion. Pierce also touted his ability to win a House seat in a Democratic district, while Weld had lost to the Democratic front-runner for governor Francis Bellotti in the 1978 attorney general's race.

==== Results ====
Despite losing the convention and trailing Pierce in the polls, Weld was able to come from behind, and defeated Pierce in the Republican primary.

Primary results by municipality

Massachusetts Republican gubernatorial primary, 1990
| Party | Candidate | Votes | % |
|---|---|---|---|
| Republican | Bill Weld | 270,319 | 60.56% |
| Republican | Steven Pierce | 176,070 | 39.44% |
| Total votes | | 446,389 | 100.00% |

=== Lieutenant governor ===
==== Candidates ====
- Paul Cellucci, state senator from Hudson (running with Weld)
- Peter G. Torkildsen, state representative from Danvers (running with Pierce)

==== Results ====
State senator Paul Cellucci, Weld's running mate, defeated state representative Peter G. Torkildsen, Pierce's running mate, for the Republican nomination.

Massachusetts Republican lt. gubernatorial election, 1990
| Party | Candidate | Votes | % |
|---|---|---|---|
| Republican | Paul Cellucci | 241,354 | 59.41% |
| Republican | Peter G. Torkildsen | 164,732 | 40.55% |
| Total votes | | 406,086 | 100.00% |

==== Aftermath ====
Both Cellucci and Torkildsen would go on to higher office; Cellucci succeeded Weld as governor in 1998, and Torkildsen was elected to the U.S. House of Representatives in 1992.

== General election ==
=== Debates ===
1990 Massachusetts gubernatorial election debates
| No. | Date | Host | Moderator | Link | Republican | Democratic |
| Key: P Participant A Absent N Not invited I Invited W Withdrawn | | | | | | |
| Key: P Participant A Absent N Not invited I Invited W Withdrawn | | | | | Bill Weld | John Silber |
|---|---|---|---|---|---|---|
| 1 | Oct. 18, 1990 | | | C-SPAN | P | P |
| 2 | Oct. 30, 1990 | Boston Herald; WCVB-TV; WHDH (TV) | R.D. Sahl | C-SPAN | P | P |

=== Candidates ===
- Mark A. Emanation (Socialist Workers)
- John Silber, president of Boston University (Democratic)
- Dorothy Stevens, working mother (Independent; write-in)
- Leonard Umina, software executive (Independent High Tech)
- Bill Weld, former U.S. attorney for the District of Massachusetts and U.S. assistant attorney general (Republican)

Leonard Umina, a 38-year old computer executive, ran under the Independent High Tech Party banner, which he co-founded. He campaigned on establishing an independent state agency to store all government documents on a publicly-accessible mainframe to ensure government accountability and transparency, opposition to the economic policies of the Reagan years and support for transfer payments to alleviate poverty.

Dorothy L. Stevens, a single mother, ran as a write-in candidate after withdrawing from a campaign for the Democratic nomination. Her platform included a $10 minimum wage and an expansion of welfare benefits. Mark A. Emanation was the candidate of the Socialist Workers Party.

=== Campaign ===
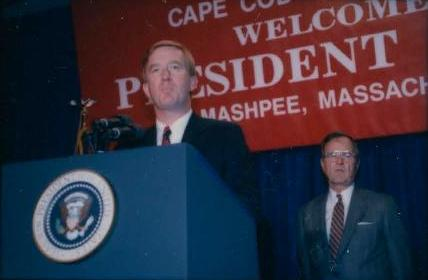
Weld campaigns in Mashpee with George Bush.

In the fall general election, typical political coalitions were scrambled, with many liberals expressing support for Weld and many conservatives backing Silber.

In the final weeks of the campaign, Silber delivered another "shocker," referring Weld as a "back-stabbing son of a bitch" for resigning as United States Attorney to protest the leadership of Edwin Meese. He followed this comment by going on local television and claiming that the proliferation of working mothers had led to an increase in child neglect.

One week before election day, Silber's lead in the polls began to vanish after an interview with Natalie Jacobson for WCVB-TV. During the interview, which was held at Silber's home, Silber pushed back on questions about feminism and his earlier remarks on child neglect and abuse, threatening to end the interview, "If I'm into another one of these Silber shocker things, then to hell with this damn program, because I don't need that." When Jacobson asked Silber to reflect on his personal strengths and weaknesses. Silber refused angrily, "You find the weakness. I don't have to go around telling you what's wrong with me. The media have manufactured about 16,000 non-existing qualities that are offensive and attributed them all to me. Let them have their field day." Although the interview was framed to focus on Silber's family and personal life, it has been cited consistently as a decisive moment in the campaign, bringing focus to Silber's anger and interactions with women.

=== Results ===
Bill Weld defeated John Silber to become the state's first Republican governor since Francis W. Sargent in 1975.

1990 Massachusetts gubernatorial election
| Party | Candidate | Votes | % | ±% |
|---|---|---|---|---|
| Republican | Bill Weld | 1,175,817 | 50.19% | ▲20.63 |
| Democratic | John Silber | 1,099,878 | 46.94% | ▼18.21 |
| Independent High Tech | Leonard Umina | 62,703 | 2.68% | |
| Independent | Dorothy Stevens (write-in) | 872 | 0.04% | |
| Write-in | | 3,657 | 0.2% | |
| Total votes | | 2,342,927 | 100.00% | |

As of 2026, this is the most recent gubernatorial election in which Amherst, Cambridge, Leverett, Shutesbury and Wendell each voted for the Republican candidate.

==== Results by county ====
| County | Bill Weld Republican | | John Silber Democratic | | Various candidates Other parties | | Margin | | Total votes cast |
| County | # | % | # | % | # | % | # | % | Total votes cast |
|---|---|---|---|---|---|---|---|---|---|
| Barnstable | 50,911 | 56.0% | 37,474 | 41.2% | 2,491 | 2.7% | 13,437 | 14.8% | 90,876 |
| Berkshire | 23,562 | 46.3% | 24,953 | 49.0% | 2,415 | 4.8% | -1,391 | -2.7% | 50,930 |
| Bristol | 71,420 | 40.9% | 97,046 | 55.6% | 6,050 | 3.5% | -25,626 | -14.7% | 174,516 |
| Dukes | 2,559 | 46.3% | 2,720 | 49.2% | 247 | 4.5% | -161 | -2.9% | 5,526 |
| Essex | 144,583 | 52.2% | 125,734 | 45.4% | 6,576 | 2.4% | 18,849 | 6.8% | 276,893 |
| Franklin | 15,101 | 53.2% | 11,822 | 41.7% | 1,449 | 5.1% | 3,279 | 11.5% | 28,372 |
| Hampden | 67,360 | 46.1% | 73,356 | 50.2% | 5,409 | 3.7% | -5,996 | -4.1% | 146,125 |
| Hampshire | 26,626 | 50.9% | 23,495 | 44.9% | 2,237 | 4.3% | 3,131 | 6.0% | 52,358 |
| Middlesex | 320,188 | 53.7% | 259,059 | 43.4% | 17,435 | 2.9% | 61,129 | 10.3% | 596,682 |
| Nantucket | 1,466 | 54.0% | 1,166 | 42.9% | 85 | 3.1% | 300 | 11.1% | 2,717 |
| Norfolk | 149,521 | 51.8% | 132,141 | 45.8% | 7,012 | 2.4% | 17,380 | 6.0% | 288,674 |
| Plymouth | 94,137 | 53.2% | 79,039 | 44.2% | 4,662 | 2.6% | 15,098 | 9.0% | 178,838 |
| Suffolk | 77,119 | 41.8% | 102,392 | 55.5% | 4,904 | 2.7% | -25,273 | -13.7% | 184,415 |
| Worcester | 130,264 | 49.0% | 129,481 | 48.7% | 6,360 | 2.3% | 783 | 0.3% | 266,005 |

Counties that flipped from Democratic to Republican

- Barnstable
- Essex
- Franklin
- Hampshire
- Middlesex
- Nantucket
- Norfolk
- Plymouth
- Worcester

== Aftermath and legacy ==
In 2015, Boston Globe columnist Scot Lehigh compared Silber's bombastic, unfiltered style during the 1990 campaign to that of Donald Trump, who went on to win a similarly surprising victory in his party's primary for president of the United States. Unlike Silber, Trump also won the general election.

== See also ==
- 1990 Massachusetts general election, for other races held alongside this one
- 1989–1990 Massachusetts legislature, for the legislature in office during this election
- 1991–1992 Massachusetts legislature, for the legislature elected alongside Weld
