= United States lightship Nantucket (WLV-612) =

American lightvessel

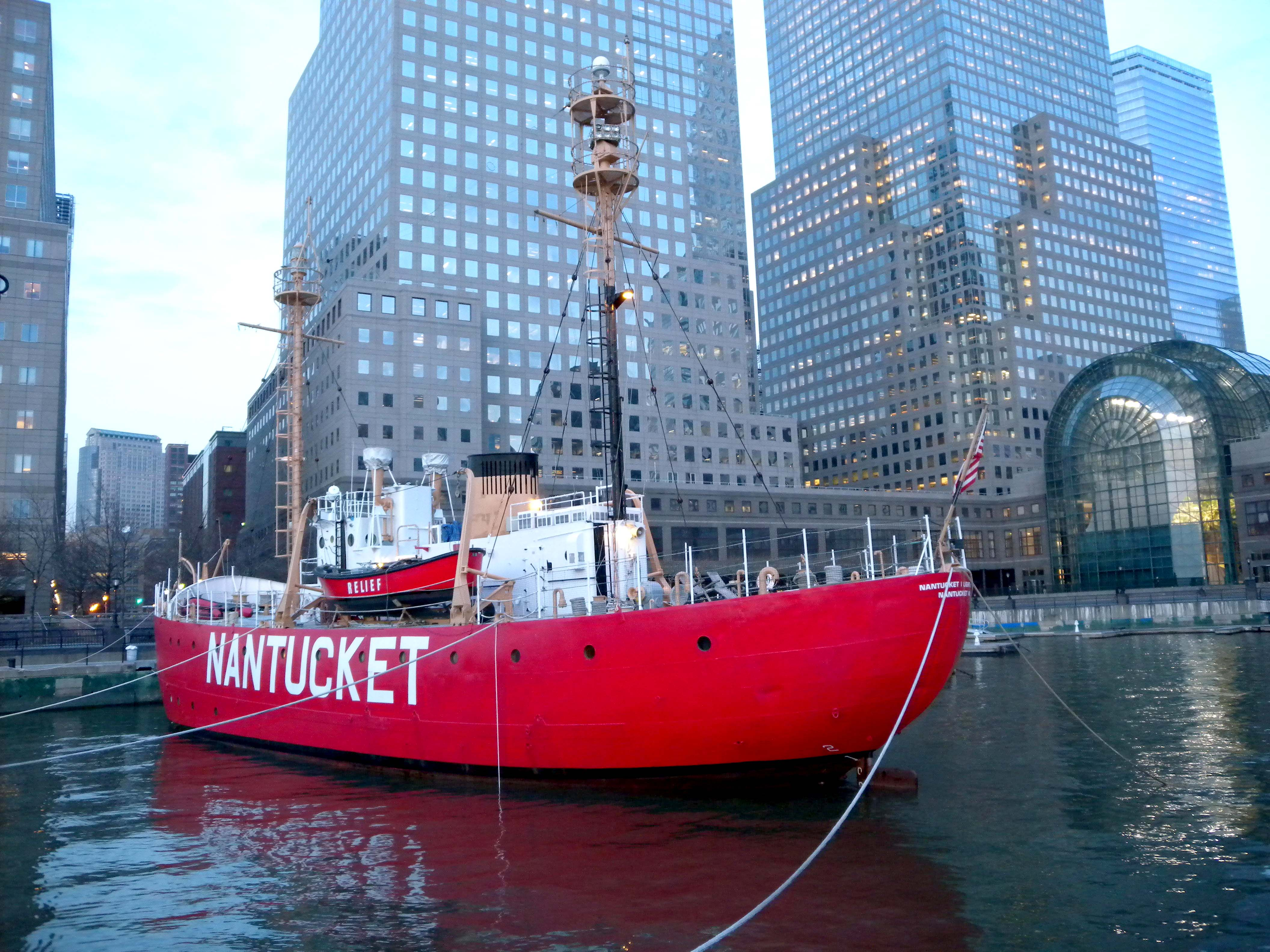
- Lightship WLV-612 (Nantucket Lightship)

History

United States
- Name: Lightship WLV-612 (Nantucket I)
- Operator: United States Coast Guard
- Builder: Curtis Bay, Maryland
- Launched: 1950
- Commissioned: 18 September 1950
- Decommissioned: 29 March 1985
- In service: 1951
- Out of service: 1983
- Renamed: Nantucket
- Refit: 2000
- Fate: Sold to private owners

General characteristics
- Class & type: Lightvessel
- Displacement: 617 tons
- Length: 128 ft (39 m)
- Beam: 30 ft (9.1 m)
- Draft: 11 (3.3 m)
- Propulsion: 550 Hp Diesel
- Speed: 9 knots (17 km/h)
- Range: 4000 miles
- Boats & landing craft carried: 26.6 ft. motorized whale boat

The Nantucket Lightship or United States Lightship WLV-612 (Nantucket I) is a lightvessel commissioned in 1950 that became the last lightship decommissioned in United States Coast Guard service.

== History ==
The Nantucket Lightship was launched in 1950 and put into service in 1951 as the San Francisco Lightship, 8.6 miles offshore of the Point Bonita Lighthouse and the Golden Gate where it was in service until 1969. From 1969 to 1971, it served as the Blunts Reef Lightship at Blunt's Freed near the Cape Mendocino Light in Northern California. From 1971 to 1975 it served as the Portland Lightship marking the entrance to Portland, Maine. It was the last lightship to serve as the Portland Lightship in 1975 when it was replaced by a Large Navigational Buoy. The Coast Guard estimated that it would spend $250,000 per year maintaining the LNB whereas a lightship cost $3 million in addition to the cost of crew.

In 1975 until 1983, the WLV-612 was reassigned as the Lightship Nantucket at Nantucket Shoals, a dangerous shoal 40 miles (64 km) southeast of Nantucket Island.

From 1979 to 1983 the WLV-612 and the United States Lightship WLV-613 alternated at Nantucket Shoals as the Nantucket I and the Nantucket II, relieving each other approximately every 21 days. On September 1, 1983, while alternating with the Nantucket II the WLV-612 served as a radar and security-communications platform off of the Bush compound in Kennebunkport, Maine, US Vice President George H. W. Bush was on board when he learned the Soviet Union had shot down Korean Air Lines Flight 007 while passing through Soviet Airspace near the Soviet-Alaskan border. The incident propelled the Reagan Administration to allow worldwide civilian access to DNSS/Navstar, the military satellite navigation system that became GPS.

The Nantucket Lightship was decommissioned in Boston on March 29, 1985.

=== Preservation ===
After decommissioning, Nantucket Lightship was purchased by the Boston Educational Marine Exchange but returned within the year to the General Services Administration due to lack of funds. In 1987, The Metropolitan District Commission (MDC) of the Commonwealth of Massachusetts purchased the Nantucket Lightship for $1,500 and sought to open it as a museum at Georges Island (Massachusetts) in Boston Harbor. Instead, due to lack of public funding, it was moved to Marina Bay (Quincy, Massachusetts) where it was maintained by the volunteers at the Friends of Lightship Nantucket. In 1992 the main engines were overhauled and it participated in the tall ship Boston's Parade of Sail for Sail Boston 1992, part of Operation Sail's events for the Christopher Columbus Quincentenary Jubilee with an estimated 8,000 to 10,000 spectator craft.

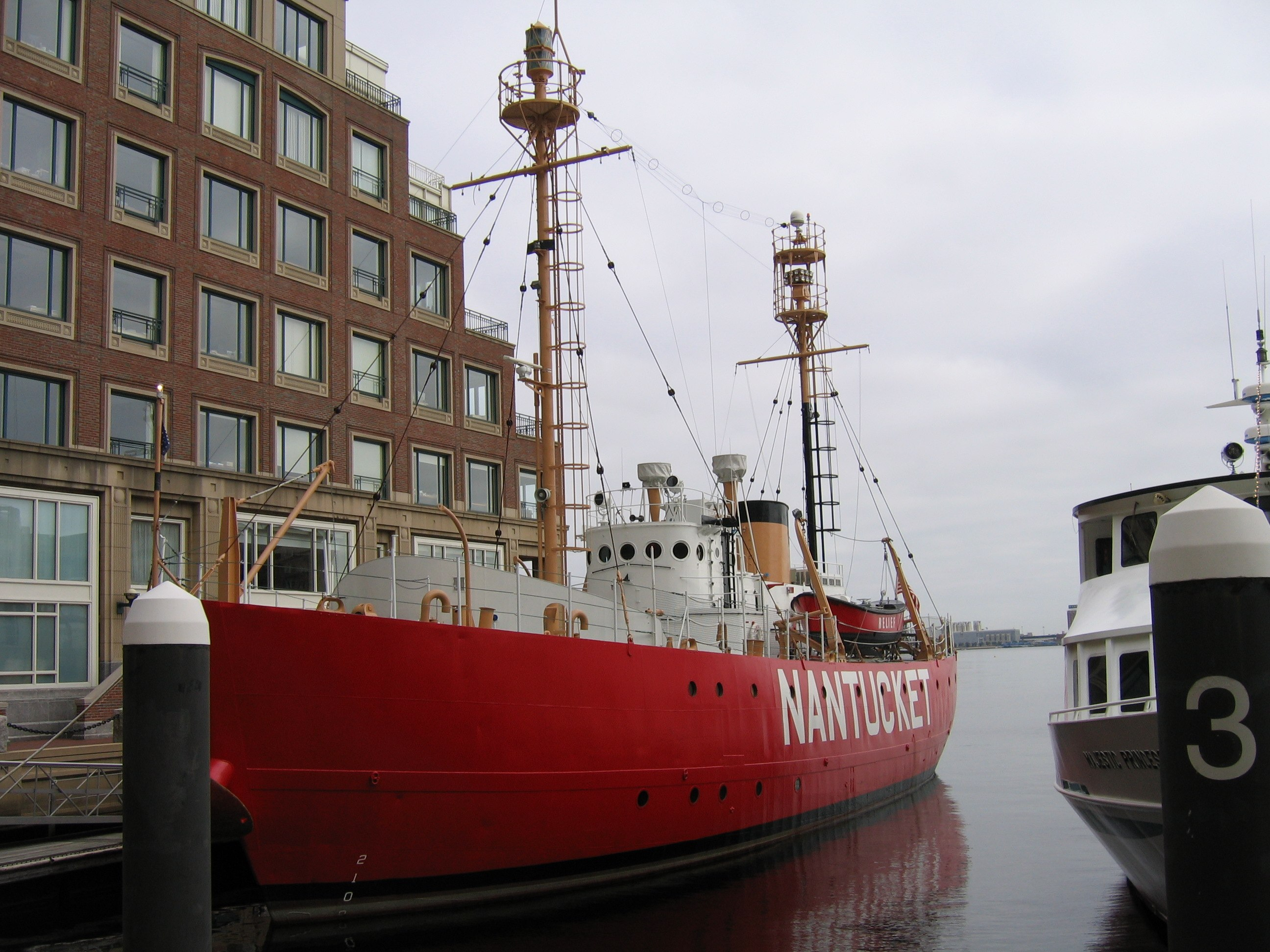
2006 Rowes Wharf in Boston

In 1999, the Commonwealth of Massachusetts declared the WLV-612 to be surplus property and was put on auction on eBay. The winning bid was by William B. Golden, who beat out scrappers. From 2000 to 2003 a team of 11 craftsmen in New Bedford, Massachusetts restored and outfitted the WLV-612 with a "master suite and four guest suites with hand carved mahogany and oak beds, six bathrooms, a kitchen with double ovens, two trash compactors, granite countertops, and a six-burner cooktop, a dining room with a tiger maple table able to seat 12, a library/den, an office, and an entertainment room with a flat-screen television, foosball table, and the captain’s original poker table." The Nantucket Lightship remains as the only fully powered and operational lightship in the United States.

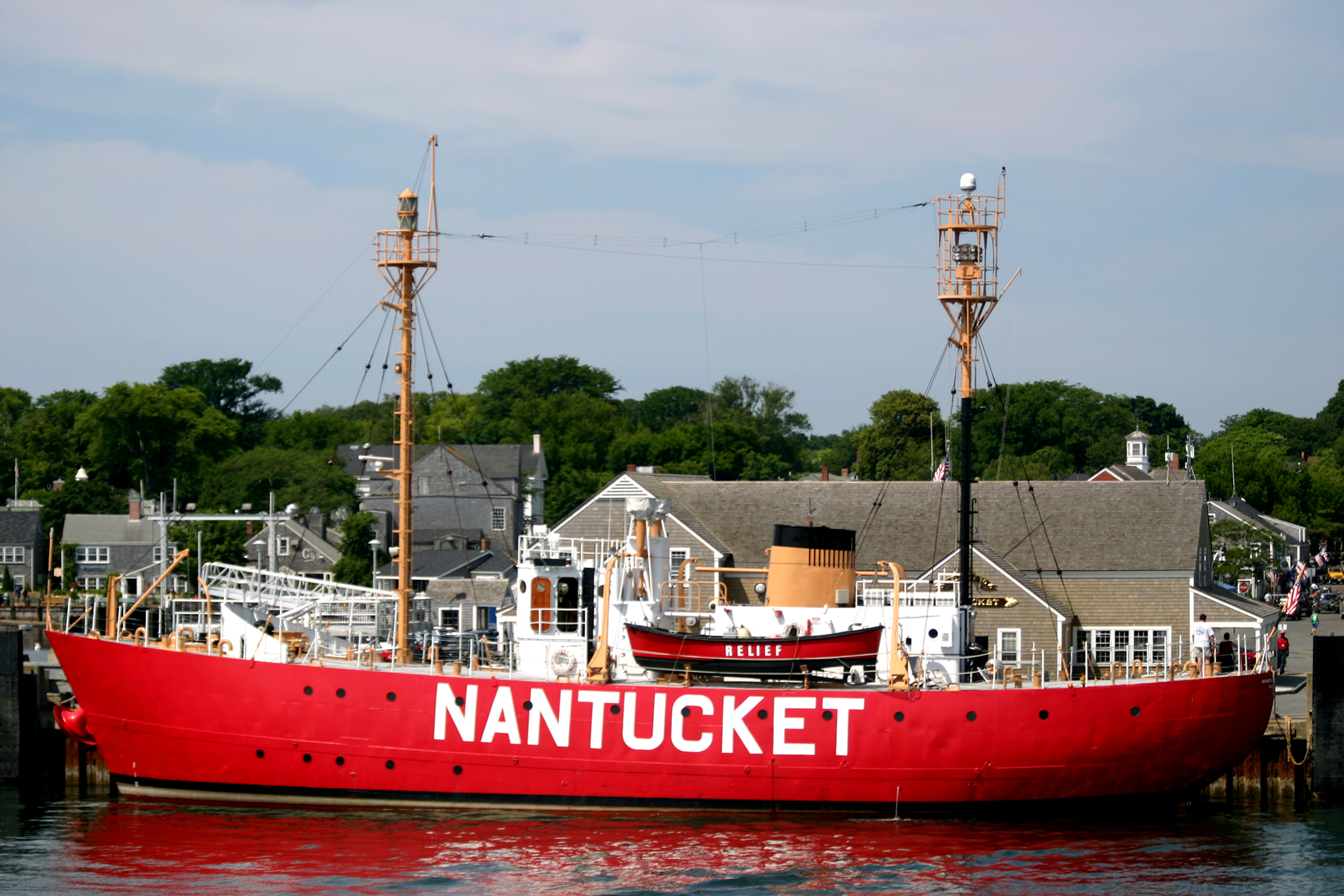
Nantucket Lightship at Straight Wharf on Nantucket Island

In August 2009, the Nantucket Lightship was anchored off the Kennedy Compound after the passing of Sen. Ted Kennedy as part of a memorial. For several years she was docked in TriBeCa in Lower Manhattan and was operated by a partnership with caterers and events company Mint Events and TASTINGS NYC-Palm Beach as an event space and yacht available for charter and from Spring 2016 until October 2016, she was docked at Pier 6 in Brooklyn Bridge Park and was hosting talks and public tours in the park. In February 2017, she was featured on WCVB-TV's program Chronicle (American TV program) while docked in New Bedford, Massachusetts. Since 2018 she has been docked in Boston Harbor, also the location of another Nantucket Lightship, the United States lightship Nantucket (LV-112).
