= Robert A. Hall =

American politician (1946–2024)

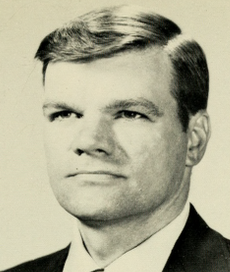
- Portrait of Robert A. Hall

Member of the Massachusetts Senate
- In office 1973–1982
- Preceded by: Joseph D. Ward
- Succeeded by: Mary L. Padula

Personal details
- Born: April 15, 1946 Collingswood, New Jersey
- Died: June 4, 2024 Madison, Wisconsin
- Party: Republican
- Education: Mount Wachusett Community College (AA); University of Massachusetts Amherst (BA); Framingham State College (MEd)

Robert A. Hall (April 15, 1946 – June 4, 2024) was an American politician who served five terms in the Massachusetts State Senate.

== Background and military career ==
Hall was born in Collingswood, New Jersey on April 15, 1946. After graduating from the Collingswood High School in 1964, he joined the United States Marine Corps. He served four years from 1964 until 1968, when he left the Marines as a corporal to attend college. He later rejoined the United States Marine Corps Reserve while in the Massachusetts Senate, serving from 1977 to 1983 as a radio operator and public information officer. He finally left the Corps in 1983 as a staff sergeant due to time conflicts with his civilian profession after declining a commission as a second lieutenant.

Hall received an associate of arts degree from Mount Wachusett Community College in Gardner, Massachusetts in 1970, and a bachelor of arts degree in government from the University of Massachusetts Amherst in 1972. Hall earned a Master of Education degree in history from the Fitchburg State College in 1980.

== Political career ==
Hall was first elected to the Massachusetts Senate in 1972 – the year he graduated from the University of Massachusetts – by a margin of nine votes out of over 60,000 cast. He was the first Republican elected in what was then the Third Worcester District since 1938. Hall was re-elected in 1974 by a margin of 10,000 votes, carrying every city and town in the heavily Democratic district. In 1976, he was nominated by both parties, winning the Democratic primary on write-in votes against a Leominster city councilor. He was unopposed in 1978, and easily won reelection in 1980, winning 78% of the vote against a Democrat from Gardner. Hall was appointed Assistant Minority Whip in 1978 and Minority Whip in 1980. He retired in 1982.

== Life after politics ==
In 2008, he became executive director of the American Association of Hip and Knee Surgeons in Rosemont, Illinois.

Hall died of cancer on June 4, 2024, in Madison, Wisconsin.
