= Jon Westling =

American educator (1942–2021)

8th President of Boston University
- In office 1996–2002
- Preceded by: John Silber
- Succeeded by: John Silber (Interim)

Personal details
- Born: 1942
- Died: January 15, 2021 (aged 78)
- Education: Reed College; Oxford University

Jon Westling (1942 – 15 January 2021) was an American educator, and was president of Boston University from 1996 until 2002.

== Biography ==
Raised in Yakima, Washington, he took his undergraduate degree from Reed College and studied history at St. John's College, Oxford University on a Rhodes scholarship. Before joining B.U., Westling taught at Centre College in Kentucky, Reed College, the University of California, Irvine, and at the University of California, Los Angeles. He was a Freedom Rider. In 1963, his participation in a sit-in in southern Virginia landed him several days in jail.

Westling joined the Boston University faculty in 1974. He was named provost in 1984. In this role he was controversial B.U. president John Silber's top aide and twice served as acting president; first in 1987 while Silber was on sabbatical and again in 1990 while Silber was running for Governor. In 1996, he was chosen to succeed Silber, who became Chancellor of the university after a 25-year tenure as president. Westling's tenure came to an end in July 2002, when he resigned the presidency to return to teaching and research as a professor of History and Humanities. Silber stepped down as chancellor and reassumed the presidency on an interim basis until Aram Chobanian was appointed president ad interim in October 2003.

During his tenure, he was instrumental in bringing B.B. King and Bob Dylan to Boston University campus. According to Richard Towle, a former BU senior vice president, Westling, as president, had a "special focus on student-oriented programs," leading to the development and commissioning of various student centers, dormitories, and Agganis Arena. Moreover, says Towle, as provost under John Silber, he played a pivotal role in the recruitment of four Nobel Prize winners to the faculty. As a scholar and professor, Westling specialized in the histories of Medieval Europe and Tudor England, the Protestant and Catholic Reformations, early modern philosophy and political theory, the development of the European state system, and the history and contemporary state of higher education.

After a career spanning 46 years, Westling died on January 15, 2021, at the age of 78. Beyond his tenure as president and provost, he was remembered as a professor within Boston University's Department of History and as an avid motorcyclist. He left behind three children, Emma, Matthew, and Andrew, all graduates of Boston University.

== Guckenberger v. Boston University ==
During a court case he was accused of making controversial statements about students with learning disabilities. "President Westling referred to students with learning disabilities as "a plague," and an indication of "a silent genetic catastrophe," and he has made similar statements in letters to the New York Times, the Boston Globe, campus newspapers, and students' parents."
