= Lightship Nantucket =

Lightship station in Massachusetts, US

Coordinates: 40°37′02″N 69°37′06″W

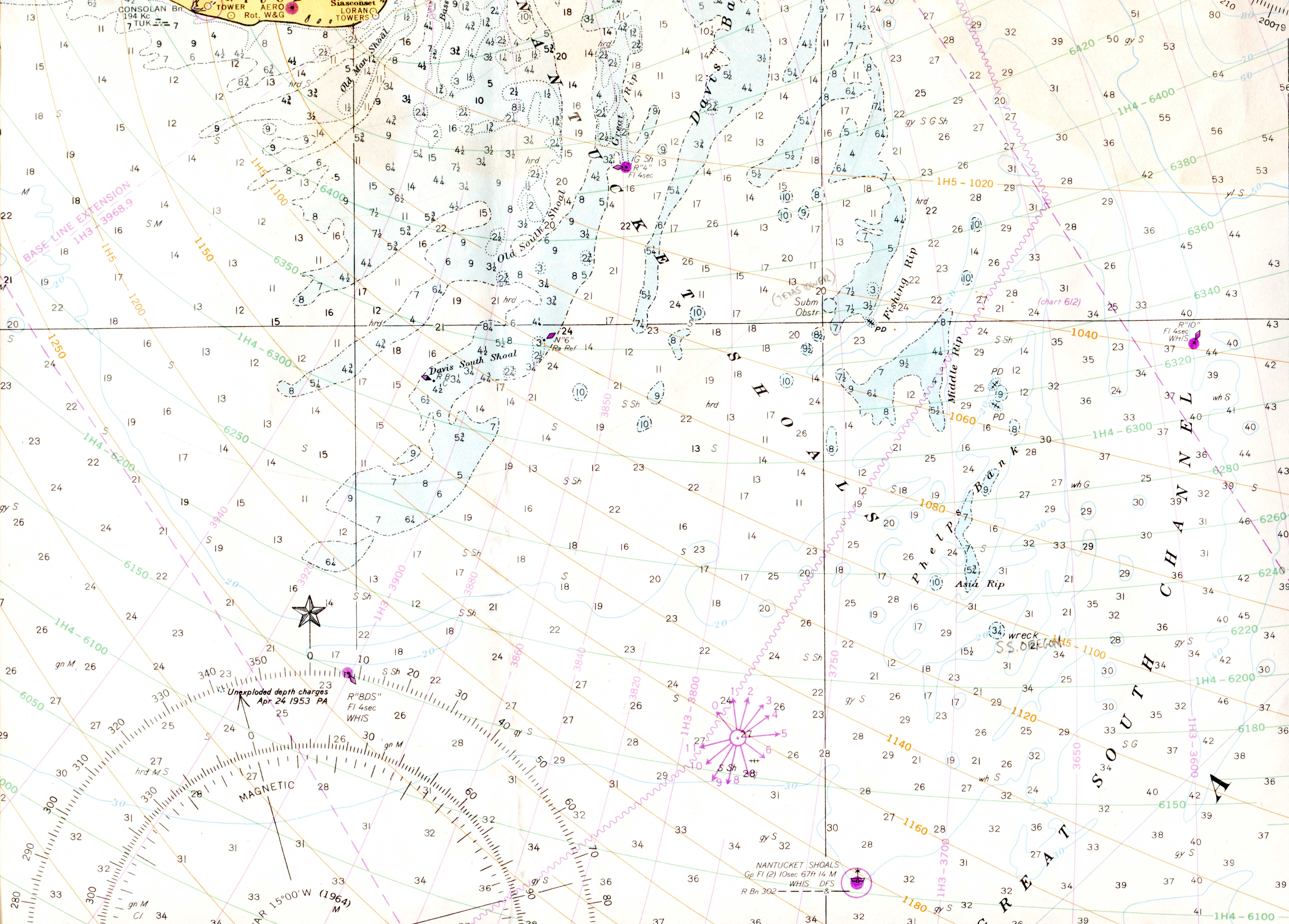
The location of the Nantucket Shoals lightship station at the southern edge of the shoals.

The station named Nantucket or Nantucket Shoals was served by a number of lightvessels (also termed lightships) that marked the hazardous Nantucket Shoals south of Nantucket Island. The vessels, given numbers as their "name," had the station name painted on their hulls when assigned to the station. Several ships have been assigned to the Nantucket Shoals lightship station and have been called Nantucket. It was common for a lightship to be reassigned and then have the new station name painted on the hull. The Nantucket station was a significant US lightship station for transatlantic voyages. Established in 1854, the station marked the limits of the dangerous Nantucket Shoals. She was the last lightship seen by vessels departing the United States, as well as the first beacon seen on approach. The position was 40 miles (64 km) southeast of Nantucket Island, the farthest lightship in North America, and experienced clockwise rotary tidal currents.

== History ==
Lightships and their crews were exposed to many dangers. In addition to the obvious hazards posed by the weather and sea conditions, vessels marking shipping lanes on occasion were struck by the very traffic they existed to protect. Ships would home on their radio beacons at night and in fog, but were expected to post lookouts and to turn away in time.

=== Lightship 11 ===
Lightship 11 was built in 1853 by Tardy & Auld of Baltimore, Maryland for $13,462.00. Lightship 11 was built of white oak and equipped with two lanterns and a hand-operated 1,050-pound (480 kg) bell fog signal. Each of the lanterns contained eight constant-level oil lamps. Lightship 11 was blown ashore in 1855 and rebuilt at the New York Navy Yard for further service at Brenton Reef, Rhode Island.

=== Lightship 1 ===
Lightship 1 was built in 1855 at the Portsmouth Naval Shipyard for $48,000.00. Lightship 1 was built of white oak and live oak and equipped with two lanterns and a hand-operated bell fog signal. Each of the lanterns contained eight oil lamps with reflectors. Lightship 1 was rebuilt in 1860 and the main anchor was replaced with a mushroom in 1881 and then a stockless mushroom anchor in 1886. Lightship 1 was transferred to Martins Industry, South Carolina in 1892.

=== Lightship 54 ===
Lightship 54 was built in 1892 at West Bay City, Michigan for $53,325.00. Lightship 54 was built of iron and equipped with two lanterns, a 12-inch steam chime whistle, and a hand-operated 1,000-pound (450 kg) bell fog signal. Each of the lanterns contained eight oil lamps with reflectors. Twenty-five tons of pig iron ballast were added in 1893; and Lightship 54 was transferred to Boston, Massachusetts in 1894.

=== Lightship 58 ===
Lightship 58 was built in 1894 by Craig Shipbuilding of Toledo, Ohio for $50,870.00. Lightship 58 was built of an iron-plated steel frame and equipped with two lanterns, a 12-inch steam chime whistle, and a hand-operated bell fog signal. Each of the lanterns contained eight oil lamps with reflectors. Lightship 58 was transferred to Fire Island, New York in 1896.

=== Lightship 66 ===
Lightship 66 was built in 1896 by Bath Iron Works of Bath, Maine for $69,282.00. The vessel was built on a wood-sheathed steel frame and equipped with a 12-inch steam chime whistle, and a cluster of four electric lens lanterns mounted in galleries at each mast head. She carried a Baird evaporator and distilling apparatus. Breaking adrift required replacement of seven mushroom anchors and 565 fathoms (1,033 m) of chain between 1896 and 1900. Experimental wireless telegraph equipment was installed in 1901 and the vessel became the first United States lightship with permanent radio equipment in 1904. Lightship 66 was placed in relief service following replacement by Lightship 85 in 1907.

=== Lightship 85 ===
Lightship 85, a wooden lightship, was built in 1907 at Camden, New Jersey for $99,000.00. Lightship 85 was transferred to the U.S. Navy by Executive Order on 11 April 1917, along with the entire Lighthouse Service. While in the Navy during World War I she continued her former peacetime routine warning shipping away from Nantucket Shoals and also aided in guarding nearby waters against German U-boats. Sailors from the Lightship aided in the rescue of people after the Boston Molasses Disaster, partly because it was docked nearby. After peace was restored in 1919, Lightship 85 was returned to the U.S. Commerce Department. Lightship 85 was placed in relief service following replacement by Lightship 106 in 1923.

=== Lightship 106 ===
Lightship 106 was built in 1923 by Bath Iron Works of Bath, Maine for $200,000.00. Lightship 106 was built on a steel hull and equipped with a 12-inch steam chime whistle, a hand-operated bell, a submarine bell, a submarine oscillator, a radio beacon, and a 375 mm (14.8 in) electric lens lantern at each mast head. Lightship 106 was placed in relief service following replacement by Lightship 117 in 1931, returned to Nantucket when Lightship 117 was sunk in 1934, and returned to relief service when replaced by Lightship 112 in 1936.

=== Lightship 117 ===
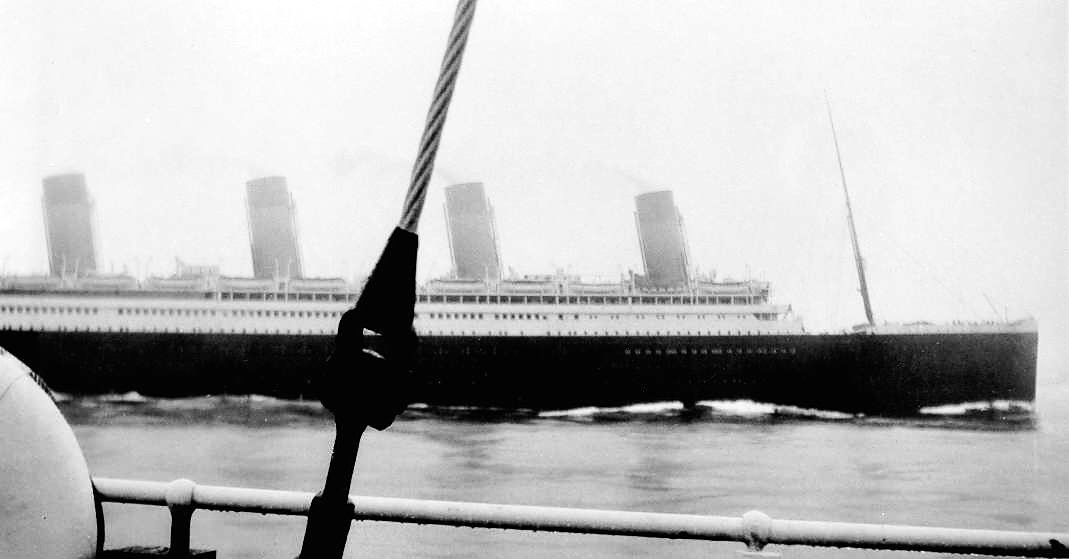
RMS Olympic passes Nantucket Lightship 117 in early 1934.

Lightship 117 at Nantucket was sideswiped by the SS Washington in early 1934, and four months later, on 15 May 1934, she was rammed and sunk by the British White Star ship RMS Olympic homing in on its radio beacon in dense fog. Four men went down with the ship and seven survivors were picked up by the Olympic. Three survivors later died of injuries sustained from the collision. The sunken wreck now lies hidden in 200 feet (60 m) of water 50 miles (80 km) south of Nantucket Island, Massachusetts.

=== Lightship 112 ===
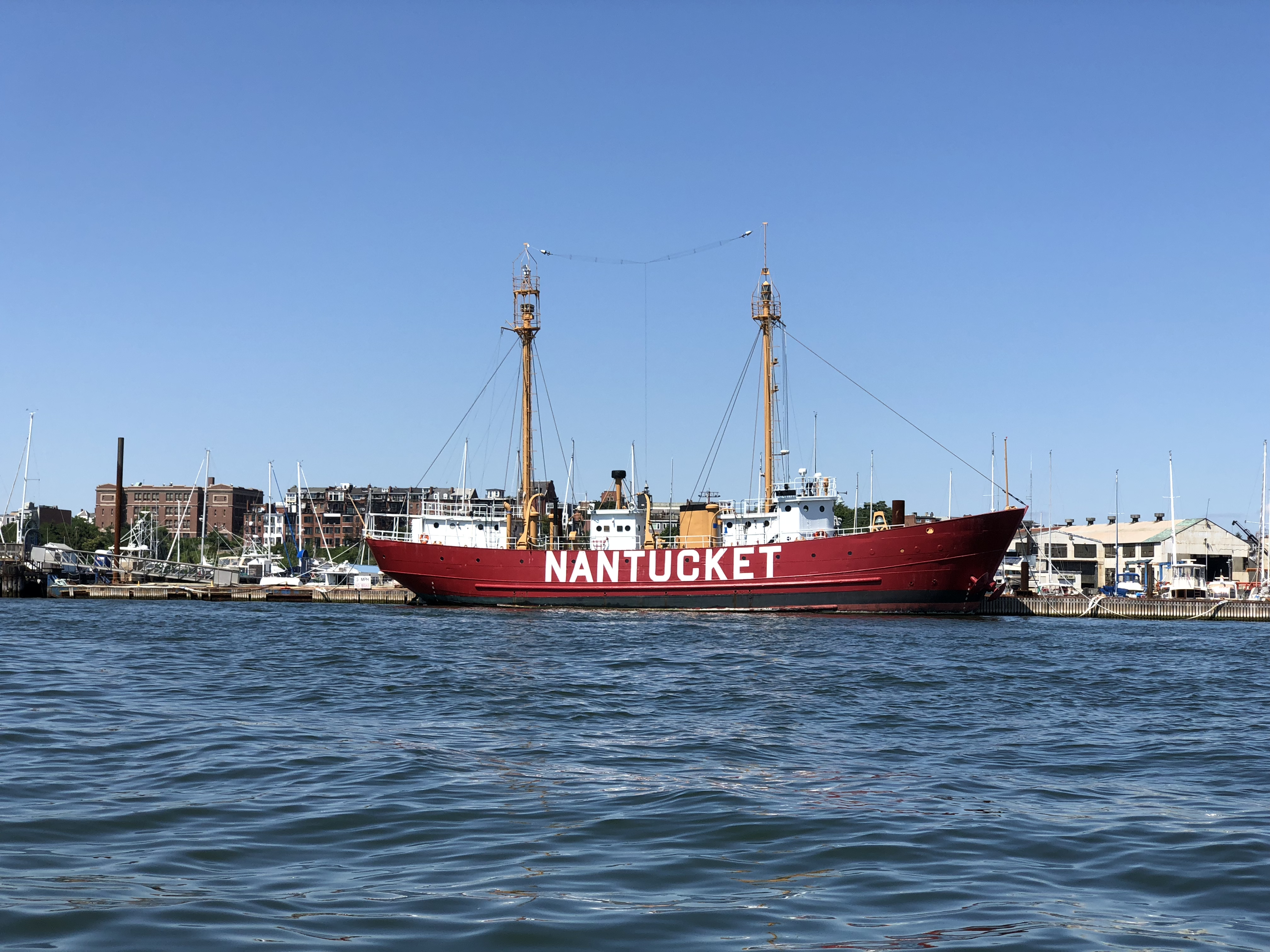
LV-112 in Boston harbor

In 1936, Pusey & Jones of Wilmington, Delaware built Lightship 112, the largest lightship ever, for $300,956.00. This ship was paid for by the British government as reparation for the deadly collision between Olympic and Lightship 117.

During World War II, Lightship 112 was withdrawn from the Nantucket Shoals station and used as an examination vessel in Portland, Maine. On 5 January 1959, she was blown 80 miles (130 km) off-station in hurricane-force winds accompanied by fifty-foot seas. This event effectively put her out of communication for several days due to water-damaged electronics. Lightship 112 outlasted all other lightships assigned to that station, having marked it for 39 years.

On 10 May 2010, Lightship LV-112, the largest lightship ever built in the US, returned to Boston for renovation and preservation.

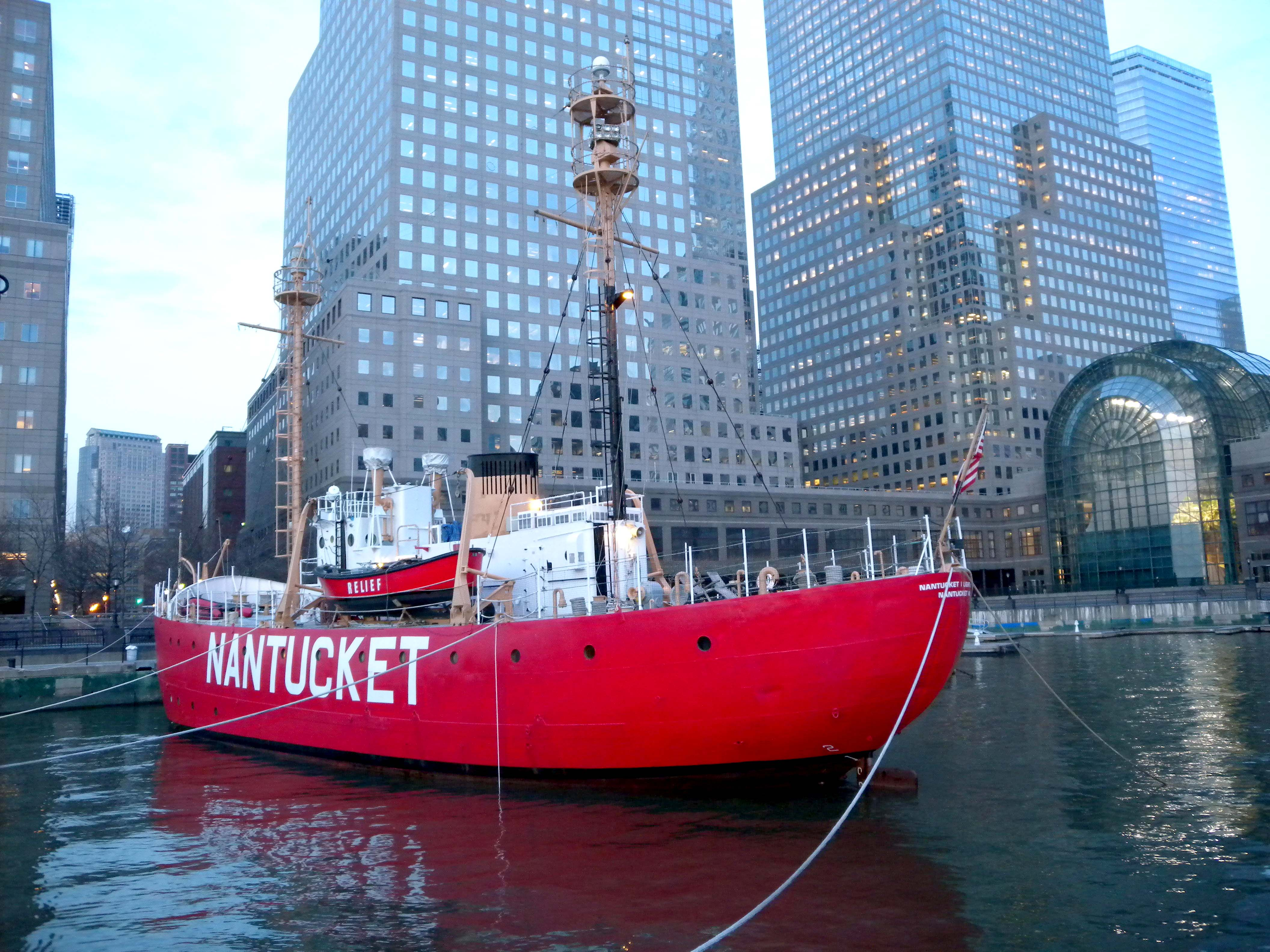
WLV-612 at World Financial Center

=== Lightship 612 ===
Built in 1950 at Curtis Bay, Maryland by the United States Coast Guard Yard for $500,000, Lightship 612 was the last ship to serve a full tour of duty on the Nantucket Shoals station and was also the last US lightship in commission. In 1975 Lightship Ambrose, the Nantucket's sister ship, was renamed Lightship Nantucket II and the two ships spelled one another, relieving each other approximately every 21 days.

At 2:30 a.m. on 20 December 1983 the Lightship 613 relieved Lightship 612 until 8:00 a.m. when she was relieved by a Large Navigational Buoy, making Lightship 613 the last Lightship on station in the US and on Nantucket Station.

In December 1983 the Lightship 613 was sold to the New England Historic Seaport to become a museum ship in Boston and Lightship 612 was reassigned to cutter duty.

Finally, after being decommissioned on 29 March 1985 and ending the 165 year era of United States Lightship service, Lightship 612 was sold to the Boston Educational Marine Exchange and shortly thereafter was taken over by the Commonwealth of Massachusetts. In March 2000, she was purchased by William and Kristen Golden, restored as the only fully operational Lightship in the United States and converted to a luxury yacht that was berthed at Rowes Wharf in Boston. In the summer of 2007 she was available for charter in Nantucket harbor and Newport. The Nantucket Lightship WLV612 was chartered for one year by the 5 star Delamar Hotel in Greenwich Connecticut in 2008, served as the mothership for the New York Yacht Club summer cruise and was chartered from November 2008 through 31 May 2009 at The North Cove Marina at the World Financial Center in Manhattan, New York. During the summers of 2009 and 2010, Lightship WLV612 was docked in Martha's Vineyard on Charter in Martha's Vineyard, Nantucket, Newport and Long Island Sound, returning in the fall of 2010 for charters Newport. On 26 August 2009, after the death of Massachusetts Senator Ted Kennedy, the lightship honored him by illuminating his schooner at the Kennedy Compound.

=== Lightship 613 ===
Built at the United States Coast Guard Yard in Curtis Bay, Baltimore, Maryland in 1952. It was the last lightship ever built and launched in the United States, and the last lightship commissioned in service. Commissioned in September 1952 as the WAL-613 with a conventional mast, it was refit in 1953 with a "large cylindrical lantern housing installed on tripod foremast with a duplex revolving high intensity light of British design... rated at 5.5 million candlepower." On December 20, 1983, the WLV-613 relieved WLV-612 at 2:30 AM, remaining on the Nantucket station until approximately 8 AM when the WLV-613 was replaced at the Nantucket Shoals station with a Large Navigation Buoy. Likewise, with its last five-and-a-half hours of service, the WLV-613 was the last lightship on Nantucket Shoals and the last lightship in service in the United States. The WLV-613 is currently owned by William and Kristen Golden, who also own the WLV-612.

== Name and station assignments ==
Lightship 85:

- Nantucket, Nantucket Shoals, MA (1907–23)
- Relief, 1st District (1923–42)
- Examination vessel, World War II (1942–44)
- Relief, 1st District (1944–51)
- Boston, Boston, MA (1951–62)

Lightship 117:

- Nantucket, Nantucket Shoals, MA (1931–34)

Lightship 112:

- Nantucket, Nantucket Shoals, MA (1936–42)
- Examination Vessel, World War II (1942–45)
- Nantucket, Nantucket Shoals, MA (1945–58)
- Relief, 1st District (1958–60)
- Nantucket, Nantucket Shoals, MA (1960–75)

Lightship 612:

- San Francisco, San Francisco, CA (1951–69)
- Blunts Reef, Blunts Reef, CA (1969–71)
- Portland, Portland, ME (1971–75)
- Nantucket, Nantucket Shoals, MA (1975–83)

Lightship WLV-613:

- Ambrose, Ambrose Channel, NY (1952–67)
- Relief, MA (1967–79)
- Nantucket-II, Nantucket Shoals, MA (1979–83)
- Nantucket-II relieved 612 for one day then was relieved by a Large Navigational Buoy, therefore 613 was last Lightship on station in US.
