= 1990 Massachusetts elections =

1990 Massachusetts general election
- November 6, 1990

Part of the 1990 United States elections

A Massachusetts general election was held on November 6, 1990 in the Commonwealth of Massachusetts.

The election included:

- statewide elections for United States Senator, Governor, Lieutenant Governor, Attorney General, Secretary of the Commonwealth, Treasurer, and Auditor;
- district elections for U.S. Representatives, State Representatives, State Senators, and Governor's Councillors; and
- ballot questions at the state and local levels.

Democratic and Republican candidates were selected in party primaries held September 19, 1990.

== Governor & Lieutenant Governor ==
Republicans William Weld and Paul Cellucci were elected Governor and Lieutenant Governor, respectively, over Democratic candidates John Silber and Marjorie Clapprood. Weld's victory was the first for a Republican since 1970.

== Attorney general ==
1990 Massachusetts Attorney General election
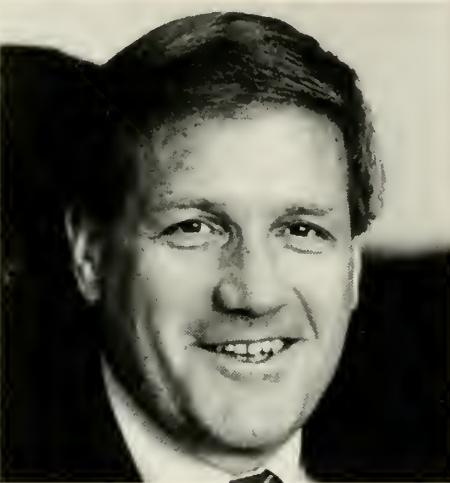

Nominee	Scott Harshbarger	William C. Sawyer
Party	Democratic	Republican
Popular vote	1,442,359	808,398
Percentage	64.1%	35.9%
Attorney General before election
James Shannon
Democratic
Elected Attorney General
Scott Harshbarger
Democratic

Democrat Scott Harshbarger was elected Attorney General. He defeated incumbent James Shannon in the Democratic primary and Republican William C. Sawyer in the general election.

=== Democratic primary ===
==== Candidates ====
- Scott Harshbarger, Middlesex County District Attorney
- James Shannon, incumbent Attorney General and former U.S. Representative from Lowell

==== Results ====
Massachusetts Attorney General Democratic Primary, 1990
Party	Candidate	Votes	%
Democratic	Scott Harshbarger	533,481	53.56%
Democratic	James Shannon (incumbent)	462,296	46.41%
Write-in		253	0.03%

=== Republican primary ===
==== Candidates ====
- Guy Carbone
- William C. Sawyer

==== Results ====
Massachusetts Attorney General Republican Primary, 1990
Party	Candidate	Votes	%
Republican	William C. Sawyer	199,567	52.73%
Republican	Guy Carbone	178,669	47.21%
Write-in		231	0.00%

=== General election ===
Massachusetts Attorney General Election, 1990
Party	Candidate	Votes	%	±%
Democratic	Scott Harshbarger	1,442,359	64.06%	▲9.41
Republican	William C. Sawyer	808,398	35.90%	▼9.44
Write-in		783	0.04%	▲0.03
Total votes		2,251,540	100.00%	

== Secretary of the Commonwealth ==
1990 Massachusetts Secretary of the Commonwealth election
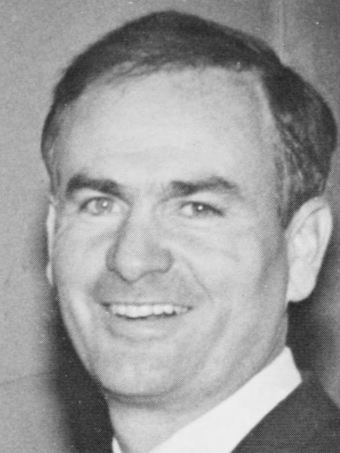

Nominee	Michael J. Connolly	Paul McCarthy	Barbara Ahearn
Party	Democratic	Republican	Ind. High Tech
Popular vote	1,011,303	844,085	143,324
Percentage	45.9%	38.3%	15.8%
- Connolly: 30–40% 40–50% 50–60% 60–70% 70–80% >90% McCarthy: 30–40% 40–50% 50–60% 60–70%
Secretary of the Commonwealth before election
Michael J. Connolly
Democratic
Elected Secretary of the Commonwealth
Michael J. Connolly
Democratic

Incumbent Secretary of the Commonwealth Michael J. Connolly defeated Republican Paul McCarthy and Independent Barbara F. Ahearn in the general election.

Former Celtics star Dave Cowens entered the race as a Republican, but because he did not register by June 5, 1989, he was unable to appear on the primary ballot and dropped out.

=== General election ===
==== Candidates ====
- Barbara F. Ahearn (Independent High Tech)
- Michael J. Connolly, incumbent Secretary since 1979 (Democratic)
- Paul McCarthy (Republican)

==== Results ====
Massachusetts Secretary of the Commonwealth Election, 1990
Party	Candidate	Votes	%	±%
Democratic	Michael J. Connolly (incumbent)	1,011,303	45.88%	▼22.13
Republican	Paul McCarthy	844,085	38.29%	▲6.30
Ind. High Tech	Barbara F. Ahearn	347,703	15.77%	N/A
Write-in		1,129	0.05%	▲0.05
Total votes		2,244,220	100.00%	

== Treasurer and Receiver-General ==
1990 Massachusetts Treasurer and Receiver-General election
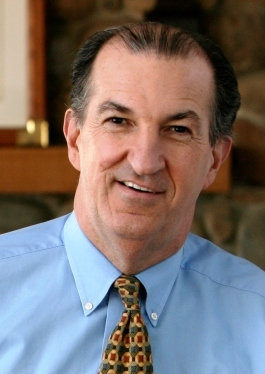

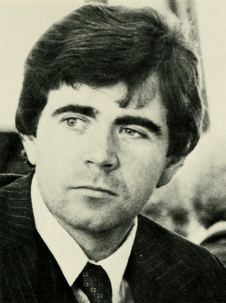

Nominee	Joe Malone	William F. Galvin	C. David Nash
Party	Republican	Democratic	Ind. High Tech
Popular vote	1,298,521	825,808	143,324
Percentage	57.2%	36.4%	6.3%
- County results Malone: 40–50% 50–60% 60–70% Galvin: 40–50%
Treasurer and Receiver-General before election
Robert Q. Crane
Democratic
Elected Treasurer and Receiver-General
Joe Malone
Republican

Incumbent Treasurer and Receiver-General Robert Q. Crane did not run for re-election. Republican Joe Malone defeated Democratic State Representative William F. Galvin and Independent C. David Nash in the general election.

=== Democratic primary ===
==== Candidates ====
- William F. Galvin, State Representative from Allston–Brighton, Boston
- George Keverian, Speaker of the Massachusetts House and State Representative from Everett
- Dick Kraus, State Senator from Arlington

==== Results ====
Massachusetts Treasurer and Receiver-General Democratic Primary, 1990
Party	Candidate	Votes	%
Democratic	William F. Galvin	489,512	50.98%
Democratic	George Keverian	287,626	29.95%
Democratic	Dick Kraus	182,715	19.03%
Write-in		436	0.05%
Total votes		960,289	100.00%

=== General election ===
Massachusetts Treasurer and Receiver-General Election, 1990
Party	Candidate	Votes	%	±%
Republican	Joe Malone	1,298,521	57.24%	▲15.57
Democratic	William F. Galvin	825,808	36.41%	▼19.90
Ind. High Tech	C. David Nash	143,324	6.32%	N/A
Write-in		753	0.03%	Steady
Total votes		2,268,406	100.00%	

== Auditor ==
1990 Massachusetts Auditor election
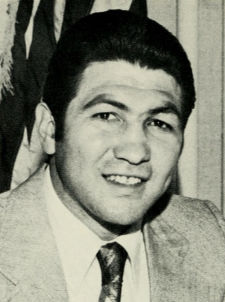

Nominee	A. Joseph DeNucci	Douglas J. Murray	Steven K. Sherman
Party	Democratic	Republican	Ind. High Tech
Popular vote	1,298,521	801,116	183,136
Percentage	57.2%	36.9%	8.4%
Auditor before election
A. Joseph DeNucci
Democratic
Elected Auditor
A. Joseph DeNucci
Democratic

Democrat A. Joseph DeNucci was re-elected Auditor. He defeated Republican Douglas J. Murray and Independent candidate Steven K. Sherman.

Massachusetts Auditor Election, 1990
Party	Candidate	Votes	%	±%
Democratic	A. Joseph DeNucci (incumbent)	1,187,241	54.66%	▼8.53
Republican	Douglas J. Murray	801,116	36.88%	▲0.07
Ind. High Tech	Steven K. Sherman	183,136	8.43%	N/A
Write-in		607	0.03%	▲0.02
Total votes		2,268,406	100.00%	

== Massachusetts General Court ==
=== Massachusetts Senate ===
1990 Massachusetts Senate elections
- November 6, 1990

All 40 seats in the Massachusetts Senate 21 seats needed for a majority
	Majority party	Minority party
Party	Democratic	Republican
Seats before	32	8
Seats won	24	16
Seat change	▼8	▲8

All 40 seats in the Massachusetts Senate were up for election in 1990.

=== Massachusetts House of Representatives ===
1990 Massachusetts House of Representatives elections
- November 6, 1990

All 160 seats in the Massachusetts Senate 81 seats needed for a majority
	Majority party	Minority party	Third party
Party	Democratic	Republican	Independent
Seats before	128	32	0
Seats won	121	38	1
Seat change	▼7	▲6	▲1

All 160 seats in the Massachusetts House of Representatives were up for election in 1990.

== United States Senator ==
Democratic incumbent John Kerry was re-elected over Republican Jim Rappaport.

== Ballot questions ==
=== Question 1 ===
Proposed Amendment to the Constitution – The proposed constitutional amendment would repeal the constitutional provision that a state census be taken and used as the basis for determining state representative, senatorial, and councilor districts. The proposed constitutional amendment would provide that the federal census shall be the basis for determining such districts.

Proposed Legislative Amendment to the Constitution
Candidate		Votes	%	±
✓	Yes	1,731,341	78.29%	
	No	479,999	21.71%	

=== Question 2 ===
Law Proposed by Initiative Petition - The proposed law sought to place restrictions on the State’s use of consultants. It sought various limits on the amount of profit, overhead charges and expenses that the State could pay consultants. The duration of consultant contracts was for two years and any extension to one year, and such contracts could be changed only if payments exceeded the original contract. The proposed initiative sought to limit to $100,000 the amount the State could pay on a consultant contract with an individual and would require all other consultant contracts in excess of $25,000 to be awarded through competitive bidding. It sought to prohibit consultants from supervising State employees, and it would limit the use of consultants as substitutes for State employee positions.

Law Proposed by Initiative Petition
Candidate		Votes	%	±
	Yes	1,038,174	45.64%	
✓	No	1,236,739	54.36%	

=== Question 3 ===
Law Proposed by Initiative Petition – The proposed initiative would have changed the state income tax rate, affected language contained in certain tax provisions, and regulated the setting of fees by state agencies and authorities.

Law Proposed by Initiative Petition
Candidate		Votes	%	±
	Yes	935,337	40.09%	
✓	No	1,397,542	59.91%	

=== Question 4 ===
Law Proposed by Initiative Petition – This proposed initiative sought to change the state election laws governing the establishment of political parties and the nomination of candidates.

Law Proposed by Initiative Petition
Candidate		Votes	%	±
✓	Yes	1,134,535	52.46%	
	No	1,027,966	47.54%	

=== Question 5 ===
Law Proposed by Initiative Petition – This proposed initiative sought to regulate the distribution to cities and towns of the Local Aid Fund, which consists of at least 40% of the revenue generated by the state income, sales, and corporate taxes, as well as the balance of the State Lottery Fund.

Law Proposed by Initiative Petition
Candidate		Votes	%	±
✓	Yes	1,242,270	56.68%	
	No	949,561	43.32%	
