= Bill Delahunt =

American politician (1941–2024)

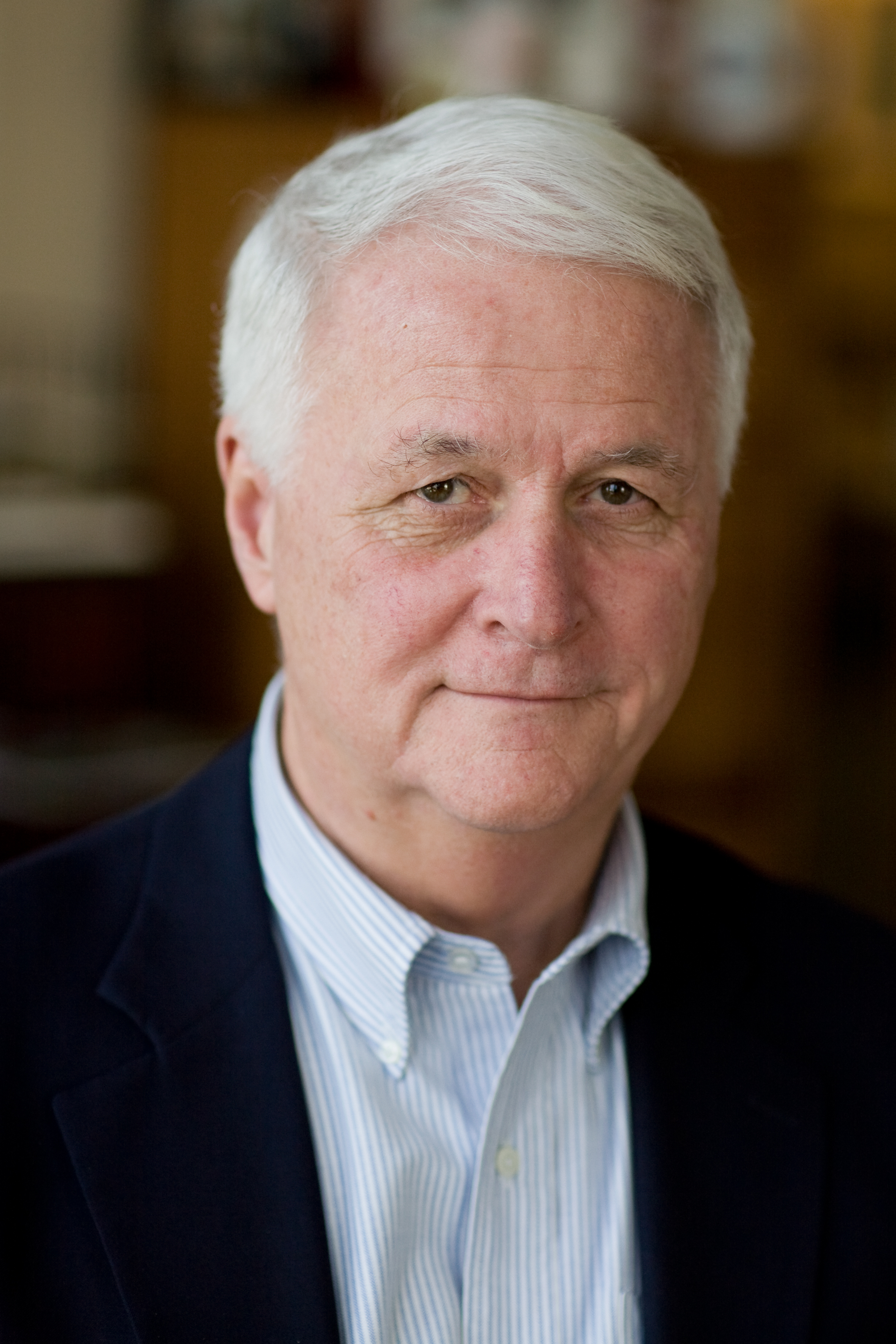
- Official portrait, 2008

Member of the U.S. House of Representatives from Massachusetts's 10th district
- In office January 3, 1997 – January 3, 2011
- Preceded by: Gerry Studds
- Succeeded by: Bill Keating

District Attorney of Norfolk County
- In office January 1975 – January 1997
- Preceded by: George G. Burke
- Succeeded by: Jeffrey Locke

Member of the Massachusetts House of Representatives
- In office January 3, 1973 – January 3, 1975
- Preceded by: Joseph E. Brett
- Succeeded by: James A. Sheets
- Constituency: 3rd Norfolk district (1973–1974); 4th Norfolk district (1974–1975)

Personal details
- Born: William David Delahunt; July 18, 1941 Quincy, Massachusetts, U.S.
- Died: March 30, 2024 (aged 82) Quincy, Massachusetts, U.S.
- Party: Democratic
- Spouse: Katharina E. Delahunt (divorced)
- Children: 2
- Education: Middlebury College (AB); Boston College (LLB)
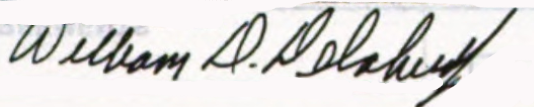
- Signature

Military service
- Branch/service: United States Coast Guard
- Years of service: 1963–1971
- Unit: Reserves

William David Delahunt (/ˈdɛləhʌnt/; July 18, 1941 – March 30, 2024) was an American lawyer and politician from Massachusetts. A member of the Democratic Party, he served in the U.S. House of Representatives representing Massachusetts's 10th congressional district from 1997 to 2011. Delahunt did not seek re-election in 2010, and left Congress in January 2011. He was succeeded by Norfolk County District Attorney Bill Keating.

== Early life, education, and early career ==
Delahunt was born in Quincy, Massachusetts, on July 18, 1941. He was educated at Thayer Academy, Middlebury College, and Boston College Law School. He served as a radarman (RD3) in the United States Coast Guard in 1963 and the United States Coast Guard Reserve from 1963 to 1971.

Delahunt was elected as a city councillor for Quincy, taking office in January 1972. He served a term in the Massachusetts House of Representatives from 1973 to 1975 before serving as district attorney of Norfolk County from 1975 to 1996.

== U.S. House of Representatives ==
=== Elections ===
In 1996, Democratic Congressman Gerry Studds decided to retire. Delahunt decided to run for Massachusetts's 10th congressional district. On September 17, 1996, Delahunt won the Democratic primary election with a plurality of 38% of the vote. He won the Plymouth County portion of the district, while losing the Norfolk County portion. He narrowly defeated state legislator Philip W Johnston of Marshfield by just 119 votes after a recount, which was conducted in a handful of contested towns. Following the recount, Delahunt sought judicial review in the Massachusetts Superior Court. After reviewing about 900 ballots, Judge Elizabeth B. Donovan declared Delahunt the victor. The case was appealed to the Massachusetts Supreme Judicial Court, which upheld the lower court ruling. The case had the issue of "hanging chads" in punch-card voting machines. On November 5, 1996, Delahunt defeated Republican state Representative Edward B. Teague III 54–42%.

Delahunt won re-election six times, defeating his opponent by at least 32 percentage points each time. On March 4, 2010, The Boston Globe confirmed that Delahunt would retire that year rather than seek reelection for an eighth term. Shortly before the announcement of his retirement, it was discovered that Delahunt, while serving as district attorney for Norfolk County, Massachusetts, had refused to file charges against Amy Bishop for shooting and killing her brother in 1986. On February 12, 2010, Bishop murdered three of her colleagues at the University of Alabama in Huntsville after being denied tenure.

=== Tenure ===
As one of his first initiatives in Congress, Delahunt created the bipartisan caucus on the United States Coast Guard in 1999, which he co-chaired with two other Coast Guard veterans, Reps. Howard Coble (R-NC) and Gene Taylor (D-MS). This benefited his district through getting the problems of outpaced resources and security recognized at the ports of Massachusetts.

In November 2005, Delahunt met with President of Venezuela Hugo Chávez to arrange an assistance program in which Venezuela would supply winter home heating oil at a 40 percent price reduction to thousands of low-income Massachusetts residents. The program, which has since been expanded to help 500,000 people across the U.S., was carried out via the Venezuelan owned Citgo, and brought accusations that Delahunt was assisting an anti-American leader. Delahunt, however, sometimes criticized Chávez, such as in a September 2006 letter expressing disgust at a speech given by Chávez to the United Nations, in which he personally attacked President George W. Bush, calling it "silly" and "inappropriate".

In the 110th U.S. Congress, Delahunt served as the chair of the United States House Foreign Affairs Subcommittee on International Organizations, Human Rights, and Oversight.

Delahunt was a consistent opponent of the war in Iraq. However, on March 10, 2010, he voted against a measure to bring troops home from Afghanistan.

=== Committee assignments ===
- Committee on Foreign Affairs
  - Subcommittee on Europe(Chairman 111th Congress)
  - Subcommittee on International Organizations, Human Rights, and Oversight (Chairman 110th Congress)
- Committee on the Judiciary
  - Subcommittee on Commercial and Administrative Law
  - Subcommittee on Crime, Terrorism, and Homeland Security
  - Task Force on Judicial Impeachment

=== Caucus memberships ===
- Co-chair of the bipartisan Coast Guard Caucus
- Co-chair of the House Older Americans Caucus
- Co-chair of the Congressional Working Group on Cuba

Delahunt was a member of the United States House Foreign Affairs Committee, Judiciary Committee, House Older Americans Caucus, and the Congressional Working Group on Cuba. In 1999, he co-founded the bipartisan Coast Guard Caucus. The Coast Guard presented him with their Distinguished Public Service Award in June 2010.

== Post-congressional career ==
=== Lobbying ===
Upon Delahunt's retirement, he formed the Delahunt Group, a lobbying firm ("multi-service consulting firm focused on Government Affairs, International Market Entry Strategies, Corporate and Development Advisory, Federal and State Funding, and Appropriations, Regulatory and Permitting Assistance, Public Policy Strategies and Public Relations"). Delahunt told the Cape Cod Times that he viewed it as an extension of his work in Congress. As a legislator, he explained, he set policy at a macro level. Now, he said: "we're taking that and bringing it down here to the communities, to encourage implementation. We're working with the private sector and the public sector in a way that's a win-win for everyone." He told the Times he was particularly interested in work that encourages regional tourism and economic development."

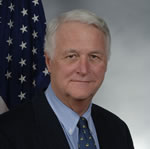
Delahunt portrait

Less than two months after leaving Congress, Delahunt lobbied on behalf of the Wampanoag people in Massachusetts to help them secure Indian gaming rights with the state legislature. Delahunt filled a gap left by the Wampanoag's previous lobbyist Jack Abramoff following his conviction associated with the renowned Jack Abramoff Indian lobbying scandal. Delahunt received over $15,000 in campaign contributions from the Wampanoag and Abramoff prior to leaving office sparking criticisms from good government advocates and casino opponents. While Delahunt was precluded by law from lobbying the Congress for at least one year, rules did not preclude him from lobbying state legislatures.

Delahunt formally announced his retirement from Congress in March 2010. Between March and December 2010, he made over $10,000 in campaign contributions to Massachusetts state legislators from his federal congressional PAC – a 500 percent increase from previous years' contributions.

Delahunt also established a lobbying partnership with the Washington, DC–based Prime Policy Group on ways American companies can establish themselves in foreign countries while helping foreign businesses with connections to in United States markets. Prime Policy Group's clients include companies like Accenture, which have been criticized for moving offshore to avoid paying U.S. taxes. This partnership dovetails with Delahunt's work on behalf of the Wampanoag as their primary backers are the Malaysian gambling giant Genting Group. Genting is seeking to establish a foothold in the United States with ventures in New York, Miami and Massachusetts. The Wampanoag venture, if approved, would give Genting a tax-free foothold in Indian gaming in the United States.

=== Medical marijuana ===
Delahunt, who was President of Medical Marijuana of Massachusetts Inc., applied for three medical marijuana dispensary licenses from the Massachusetts state Department of Public Health. The businesses would be located in Mashpee, Plymouth and Taunton. The locations were all planned to be in separate counties, so they would not compete with each other in the selection process.

Delahunt supported the creation of medical marijuana dispensaries to thwart the rise in prescription drug abuse. He was also significantly involved in the operations of any of the dispensaries that Medical Marijuana of Massachusetts opens.

In September 2014, Delahunt resigned from his position as President of Medical Marijuana of Massachusetts Inc. after the licenses for his planned dispensaries were rejected by the Massachusetts Department of Public Health.

=== Harvard Institute of Politics ===
In late May 2017, Delahunt became the acting director of the Harvard Institute of Politics.

=== Diplomacy ===
In 2013, Delahunt helped free a U.S. citizen who was imprisoned by the Venezuelan government.

== Personal life and death ==
Delahunt's paternal grandfather immigrated to the United States from Canada and his paternal grandmother's family was Irish.

Bill Delahunt and his wife, Katharina, divorced in 1986. They had one daughter, Kristin, and adopted another, Kara Mai (née Nguyen Mai Tai Trang), from Vietnam in 1975. While Congress was in session, Delahunt lived in a rented house with fellow Democratic politicians George Miller, Chuck Schumer, and Richard Durbin.

At the time of his death, he was engaged to Julie Pagano.

Delahunt died at his Quincy home on March 30, 2024, at the age of 82.

== See also ==
U.S. House of Representatives
| Preceded by Gerry Studds | Member of the U.S. House of Representatives from Massachusetts's 10th congressional district 1997–2011 | Succeeded by William R. Keating |
