= Aram Chobanian =

American academic administrator (1929–2023)

Aram Van Chobanian

Ninth President of Boston University
- In office 2005–2005
- Preceded by: Jon Westling
- Succeeded by: Robert A. Brown

President Ad Interim of Boston University
- In office 2003–2005
- Preceded by: John Silber (Interim)

Dean of the Boston University School of Medicine
- In office 1988–2003
- Preceded by: John I. Sandson
- Succeeded by: John F. McCahan

Personal details
- Born: August 10, 1929 Pawtucket, Rhode Island, U.S.
- Died: August 31, 2023 (aged 94)
- Education: Brown University; Harvard Medical School

Aram Van Chobanian (August 10, 1929 – August 31, 2023) was an American academic administrator. He served as president ad interim of Boston University from 2003 until June 9, 2005, when, in recognition of Chobanian's work, the board of trustees voted to remove “ad interim” from his title and designate him the ninth president of Boston University. He had succeeded John Silber, who had reassumed the presidency on an interim basis after Jon Westling resigned to return to teaching. In September 2005, Chobanian was succeeded by Robert A. Brown as president of Boston University. Chobanian was the first recipient of the Lifetime Achievement Award in Hypertension of the American Heart Association.

A cardiologist, Chobanian held a B.A. from Brown University and an M.D. from Harvard Medical School in 1955. Before accepting the interim position in 2003, he was the Dean of the Boston University School of Medicine.

== Relationship with Armenia ==
An Armenian-American, Chobanian was a member at the board of directors of the Fund for Armenian Relief. He was involved in several programs to improve health care in Armenia. These have included the training of Armenian physicians, nurses, and other health professionals in emergency medicine, trauma care, and health care management; development of medical residency and post-graduate educational programs in Armenia; establishment of a successful medical student elective program for US medical students to spend one to two months in Armenian hospitals and clinics; and the provision of much-needed medical equipment, supplies, and medications to Armenia.

Chobanian was elected a Foreign Member of the National Academy of Sciences of Armenia. He was the recipient of the Gold Medal from the Yerevan State Medical University. In 2007, Armenian Orthodox Catholicos Aram I, Catholicos of Cilicia, bestowed the St. Mesrob-Mashtots Medal on Chobanian.

== Death ==
Chobanian died on August 31, 2023, at the age of 94.
