= William B. Golden =

Politician in Massachusetts, US

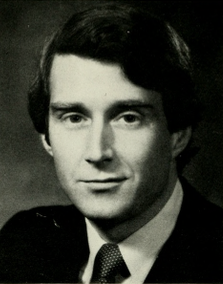
- Golden c. 1987

Member of the Massachusetts Senate from the Norfolk and Plymouth District
- In office 1985–1991
- Preceded by: Allan R. McKinnon
- Succeeded by: Robert L. Hedlund

Personal details
- Born: October 9, 1948 (age 77) Boston, Massachusetts
- Party: Democratic
- Spouses: Kristen Golden (1994-present); Paula Reynolds Golden (1968-1993)
- Education: Yale University; Boston University School of Law; Harvard University
- Occupation: Attorney; Politician
- Website: www.nichiusa.org

William Brownell Golden (born October 9, 1948, in Boston, Massachusetts) is an American attorney and politician who represented the Norfolk and Plymouth district in the Massachusetts Senate from 1985 to 1991. He was a candidate for Lieutenant Governor of Massachusetts in 1990, but lost in the Democratic primary to Marjorie Clapprood.

Golden participated in the creation of the United States Environmental Protection Agency, the National Oceanic and Atmospheric Administration, the Massachusetts Water Resources Authority, the Urban Harbors Institute and Save the Harbor/Save the Bay.

== Education ==
Golden graduated from Yale University in 1970 and earned his Juris Doctor from Boston University School of Law in 1974. Mr. Golden was also awarded an MPA from Harvard University in 1981.

== Role in Boston Harbor Cleanup ==
As City Solicitor for Quincy, Massachusetts, William Golden filed the lawsuit in December 1982 against the Metropolitan District Commission that initiated the court-ordered cleanup of Boston Harbor and the creation of the Massachusetts Water Resources Authority (MWRA). Peter Shelley of the Conservation Law Foundation wrote in a 2011 editorial that "no story about the Boston Harbor cleanup would be complete without mentioning Bill [William] Golden, then solicitor for the City of Quincy, whose fateful jog on the feces-strewn Wollaston Beach in 1982 made him mad as hell and got the whole ball rolling."

William Golden's lawsuit against the Department of Conservation and Recreation (DCR) set off the chain of events that in 1986 led federal Judge David Mazzone to order the DCR to comply with the state and federal Clean Water Act of 1972. The legislature created the new Massachusetts Water Resources Authority (MWRA) to manage Boston's drinking and wastewater. The MWRA subsequently implemented a 13-year, $4.5 billion venture to clean up the harbor.

Since Golden's lawsuit against the MDC and the subsequent creation of the MWRA, Boston finally stopped pumping its sewage directly into the harbor, greatly improving the beach ecosystem and economy in the area. Accordingly, in January 1985, State Senator Golden went on to form the nonprofit environmental group Save the Harbor/Save the Bay with Judge Paul Garrity and Boston Globe columnist Ian Menzies, to lobby for the restoration and preservation of Boston Harbor and Massachusetts Bay. The Environmental Protection Agency now calls the Boston Harbor a "great American jewel."

== National Institute for Coastal and Harbor Infrastructure ==
Golden serves as the executive director of the National Institute for Coastal and Harbor Infrastructure (NICHI). The website for the non-profit organization states that "NICHI is committed to building a broad national coalition of private and public interests to advocate for a national interstate coastal infrastructure system that integrates, enhances and funds local, regional and state coastal climate adaptation plans."

== Law career ==
William B. Golden currently serves as Of Counsel to the firm Baker, Braverman & Barbadoro, P.C. Mr. Golden has represented clients in the areas of environmental law and general litigation, and also heads the Election Law Practice Group for the firm.

== Restoration of Lightship Nantucket I WLV-612 ==
Lightship Nantucket I WLV-612 was the last ship to serve a full tour of duty on the treacherous Nantucket Shoals station and the last US lightship in commission. After being decommissioned on 29 March 1985, ending the 165-year era of United States Lightship service, William and his wife Kristen Golden purchased and restored Nantucket 612 as the only fully operational Lightship in the United States.
