= John Silber =

President of Boston University

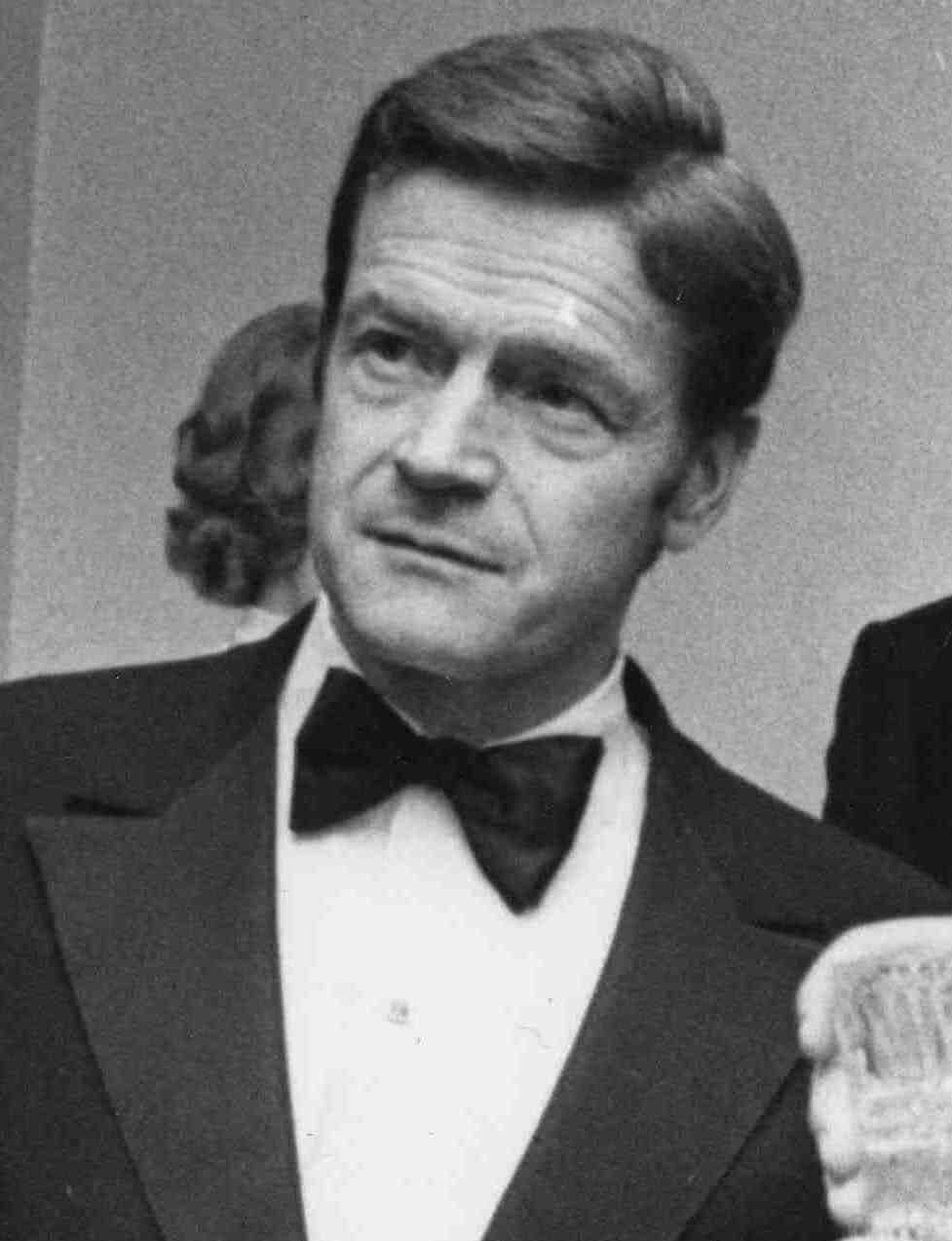
- Silber in 1977

Chancellor of Boston University
- In office 1996–2002

7th President of Boston University
- In office 1971–1996
- Preceded by: Calvin B. T. Lee (Acting)
- Succeeded by: Jon Westling

Personal details
- Born: John Robert Silber; August 15, 1926 San Antonio, Texas, U.S.
- Died: September 27, 2012 (aged 86) Brookline, Massachusetts, U.S.
- Spouse: Kathryn Underwood
- Children: 8
- Education: Trinity University (BA); Yale University (PhD)

John Robert Silber (August 15, 1926 – September 27, 2012) was an American academician and candidate for public office. From 1971 to 1996, he was President of Boston University (BU) and, from 1996 to 2002, Chancellor. From 2002 to 2003, he again served as President (Ad Interim); and, from 2003 until his death, he held the title of President Emeritus.

In 1990, he won the Democratic gubernatorial primary to become one of two major-party candidates for governor of Massachusetts in the general election of 1990. He lost that election to the Republican William Weld, who won by 38,000 votes.

After receiving his PhD from Yale, Silber became professor of philosophy and served as dean of the University of Texas's College of Arts and Sciences (1967–1970). He had a liberal reputation in his days at Texas, though at Boston University he was best known as a conservative spokesman in academia.

== Family and education ==
Silber was born in San Antonio, Texas, the second son of Paul George Silber, an immigrant architect from Germany, and Jewell (née Joslin) Silber, a Texas-born elementary school teacher. He was born with a malformed right arm that ended in a stump just below his elbow with a rudimentary thumb. Unashamed of the deformity, he had his suits tailored to expose the arm.

Both of his parents were Presbyterians. As an adult, he learned that his father's side of the family was Jewish and that his aunt had been killed at Auschwitz. His father had never said anything about it.

Silber was a member of the National Honor Society at Jefferson High School in San Antonio, and played trumpet in the school band. He graduated from Jefferson in 1943. At Trinity University in San Antonio, he double-majored in fine arts and philosophy.

In the fall of 1943, as a freshman at Trinity, he met a sophomore named Kathryn Underwood, daughter of farmers from Normanna, Texas. The couple were engaged in January 1946 and married on July 12, 1947. Silber graduated summa cum laude from Trinity in June 1947. Silber and his wife had eight children, one son and six daughters by birth and one son by adoption. Their first-born son and daughter were born before 1955. Five more daughters were born over the next eleven years. Their first-born son, David Silber, died of AIDS at age 41 at their home in December 1994. Silber's wife Kathryn died in 2005.

== Early academic career ==
Silber received his M.A. in 1952 and worked first as a teaching assistant and then as an instructor while pursuing a doctoral degree. Silber was a teaching assistant for George Schrader at Yale in the mid-1950s, and was described as "a rabid Kantian."

In 1959, Silber earned a Fulbright scholarship, which enabled him to travel to West Germany to teach at the University of Bonn for a year. It was there that he learned of his father's Jewish heritage.

His first full-time faculty job was at the University of Texas at Austin, where he chaired the Philosophy department from 1962 to 1967. Larry Hickman, Director of the Center for Dewey Studies at Southern Illinois University in Carbondale, recalls his time as a student in philosophy at UT. "The department chairs during those years, John Silber and Irwin C. Lieb, were busy using Texas oil money to collect the very best faculty and graduate students they could find."

While at UT, Silber was well known for his support of liberal causes, having founded the Texas society to abolish capital punishment and being a supporter of civil rights.

In 1967, Silber became Dean of the College of Arts and Sciences at UT. Three years later, in a widely publicized firing, Silber was removed as Dean in 1970 by the UT Regents Chairman Frank Craig Erwin Jr.

== Boston University ==
Silber was appointed president of Boston University (BU) on December 17, 1970, and took office the following month. With an annual salary that reached $800,000, Silber ranked as one of the highest paid college presidents in the country. He took a one-year leave of absence from BU in 1987, and then again in 1990 when he ran for governor of Massachusetts as a Democrat. He returned to his position at BU after losing the election to William Weld. In 1996, he was named university chancellor after retiring as president. That same year he was appointed by Governor Weld to serve as Chair of the Massachusetts Board of Education.

Among Silber's recruits to the Boston University faculty were the author Saul Bellow and Elie Wiesel, writer and concentration camp survivor.

=== Tension with faculty and students ===
Under Silber, Boston University increased in size but questions about his leadership style caused divisions among faculty and alumni. In his early days as BU President, Silber accused the faculty of mediocrity and the students of fostering anarchy, and they, in turn, accused him of tyrannical rule. The faculty organized a union in 1974 and the following year voted to affiliate with the American Association of University Professors (AAUP). Fritz Ringer, a BU faculty member, served as president of the BU chapter of the AAUP for eight years.

According to Perspectives Online, the publication of the American Historical Association, "at a time when the BU president (Silber) was running roughshod over faculty rights, Fritz Ringer bravely and vigorously championed the principles of academic freedom."

Initially, the Silber administration would not negotiate with the union, and in 1976 his refusal was challenged in a lawsuit. Two-thirds of the faculty and deans demanded that the board of trustees dismiss Silber, but the board refused. In 1978, a Federal court decided in favor of the AAUP position, and Boston University was forced to negotiate with the faculty union. The faculty conducted a strike in 1979, which was followed by a clerical workers' walkout in which several faculty members refused to cross the picket line. Silber charged five of these faculty members with negligence and moved to penalize them. At that point, faculty members throughout Boston signed a petition for the removal of Silber as university president, though it was to no avail.

Silber was especially visible in confrontations with historian Howard Zinn. In one incident, Zinn arranged to take a sabbatical and teach in Paris, with Herbert Marcuse teaching at BU in Zinn's place. But Silber vetoed the action. Silber also prevented Zinn from receiving pay raises and promotions over a number of years. In 1982, the AAUP intervened on Zinn's behalf, eventually forcing Silber to compensate Zinn for back pay. In addition, Jason Pramas wrote about Silber suppressing an anti-apartheid protest in 1986.

In 1987, Federal courts ruled that faculty in the local AAUP chapter were "managerial" employees and therefore could not engage in collective bargaining with Boston University.

=== Endowment investment controversy ===
During his tenure as president, $85 million, nearly one fifth of the Boston University endowment, was invested in a biotechnology company named Seragen. Investments continued, even after a rebuke from state regulators because of the risk involved. The bulk of the investment was lost when the Seragen stock collapsed.

=== Gay rights issues ===
In 2002, Silber ordered that the Boston University Academy, a prep school operated by BU, disband its gay–straight alliance, a student club that staged demonstrations to publicize the detrimental effects of homophobia. Silber dismissed the stated purpose of the club—to serve as a support organization for gay students and to promote tolerance and understanding between gay and straight students—and he accused the club of being a vehicle for "homosexual recruitment." Silber denounced the club for "evangelism" and "homosexual militancy" with the purpose of promoting gay sex.

=== Silber's deferred compensation ===
On May 10, 2006, The New York Times reported that the trustees of Boston University had given Silber an unprecedented compensation package, including deferred compensation, worth $6.1 million in 2005.

== Political activities ==
Silber advocated integration at the University of Texas and was the first person to chair the Texas Society to Abolish Capital Punishment. He also promoted Operation Head Start, an early education program for preschoolers.

In the Massachusetts gubernatorial election of 1990, Silber ran for Governor of Massachusetts as a Democrat. His outsider status, as well as his outspoken and combative persona, were at first viewed as advantages during a year in which voters were disenchanted with the Democratic Party establishment. As the Democratic nominee, Silber faced Republican William Weld.

Silber's perceived angry personality, along with Weld's socially liberal views, aided Weld in the race. During the campaign, Silber regularly overreacted to questions from the media, and these over-reactions came to be known as "Silber shockers." On the campaign trail, he called Massachusetts a "welfare magnet" and proposed the termination of public benefits for unmarried mothers who have a second child while still on public aid. He questioned saving the lives of terminally ill elderly people, quoting Shakespeare and saying "when you've had a long life and you're ripe, then it's time to go."

Silber also stated that the feminist Gloria Steinem, Nation of Islam leader Louis Farrakhan, and white supremacists are "the kind of people I wouldn't appoint as judges." In a key interview late in the campaign, Silber was asked by WCVB-TV newscaster Natalie Jacobson to name a weakness; he testily replied, "you find a weakness, I don't have to go around telling you what's wrong with me." After this performance, Silber's poll numbers declined rapidly. Ultimately, Weld was able to hold on to a significant portion of the Republican base while appealing to large numbers of Democrats and left-of-center independents, enabling him to defeat Silber by four points. Weld became the first Republican elected as governor since 1970. Republicans would end up winning all but two Massachusetts gubernatorial elections between 1990 and 2018.

== Publications ==
Silber wrote four books. Straight Shooting: What's Wrong with America and How to Fix It (Harper & Row, 1989), Architecture of the Absurd: How "Genius" Disfigured a Practical Art (Quantuck Lane, 2007), Kant's Ethics: The Good, Freedom, and the Will (DeGruyter, 2012) and Seeking the North Star (David R. Godine, Publisher, 2013).

Straight Shooting is part autobiography and partly a statement of Silber's concern that the United States has experienced a decline in moral and spiritual values traceable to excessive avarice and materialism. He also faults society with excessive reliance on litigation to settle disputes.

Architecture of the Absurd discusses Silber's view that certain celebrity architects frequently fail to meet the needs of their clients because they consider themselves primarily sculptors and do not adequately consider financial constraints, the physical needs of building occupants or the urban environment. He was critical of architects Josep Lluís Sert, Le Corbusier, Frank Gehry, Daniel Libeskind and Steven Holl.

In 1976, BU published a 32-page article by Silber called "Democracy: Its Counterfeits and Its Promise". Some of Silber's other articles have been published in Philosophical Quarterly, Philosophical Review, and Kant-Studien, of which he served as editor.

== Legacy ==
On May 14, 2008, Sherborn Street, which bisects the main BU Campus from Commonwealth Avenue to Back Street, was officially renamed by the City of Boston. Mayor Thomas Menino said that it was fitting to rename the street John R. Silber Way. "Was there any other way?" Menino quipped, referring to Silber's four decades of influence on the BU campus.

== Death ==
Boston University announced Silber's death on September 27, 2012. He was 86. At a memorial service on November 29, 2012, writer Tom Wolfe spoke to the 750 people who gathered, saying that Silber was a man who "couldn't bring himself to flatter."

Academic offices
Preceded by Calvin B. T. Lee (Acting)	Seventh President of Boston University; 1971–1996	Succeeded by Jon Westling (Eighth President)
Preceded by position created	Chancellor of Boston University; 1996–2002	Succeeded by position unfilled
Preceded by Jon Westling (Eighth President)	President (Ad Interim) of Boston University; 2002–2003	Succeeded by Aram Chobanian (President Ad Interim)
Party political offices
Preceded by Michael Dukakis	Massachusetts Democratic Party gubernatorial candidate 1990 (lost)	Succeeded by Mark Roosevelt
