= Marjorie Clapprood =

American politician (born 1949)

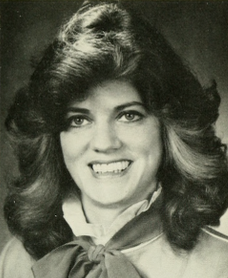

Member of the Massachusetts House of Representatives from the 8th Norfolk district
- In office January 2, 1985 – January 2, 1991
- Preceded by: William R. Keating
- Succeeded by: Louis Kafka

Personal details
- Born: September 24, 1949 (age 76) Boston, Massachusetts
- Party: Democratic
- Education: Stonehill College (BS)

Marjorie O'Neill Clapprood (born September 24, 1949, in Boston, Massachusetts ) is an American former politician and talk show host who served as a member of the Massachusetts House of Representatives for the 8th Norfolk District from 1985 to 1991. Clapprood was the Democratic nominee for Lieutenant Governor in 1990.

== Political career ==
Clapprood was elected to the Massachusetts House of Representatives in 1984. She was a candidate for Lieutenant Governor of Massachusetts in 1990, winning the Democratic nomination, but losing in the general election.

In 1998, Clapprood ran for the United States House of Representatives seat in Massachusetts's 8th congressional district. She finished fifth in a ten-way Democratic primary with 12.29% of the vote.

== Talk show career ==
Following her defeat in 1990, Clapprood joined WHDH radio as a talk show host and taught a class at Clark University. In 1992, she joined the newly launched New England Cable News. In 1993, Lifetime hired Clapprood to host a late-night public affairs talk show called Clapprood Live.

Clapprood moved her radio show to WRKO in May 1993, where she remained until 1997.

Clapprood returned to radio in 2000, hosting the midday show at WMEX. She left the station when it was sold later that year.

== See also ==
- 1991-1992 Massachusetts legislature
- 1985-1986 Massachusetts legislature

Party political offices
Preceded by Evelyn Murphy	Democratic nominee for Lieutenant Governor of Massachusetts; 1990	Succeeded by Bob Massie
