= United States House Foreign Affairs Subcommittee on Global Health, Global Human Rights, and International Organizations =

U.S. House committee

The U.S. House Foreign Affairs Subcommittee on Global Health, Global Human Rights and International Organizations is a standing subcommittee within the House Foreign Affairs Committee. It was previously known as the Subcommittee on International Organizations, Human Rights, and Oversight and the Subcommittee on Oversight and Investigations. At the start of the 118th Congress, it was given jurisdiction over global health policy and global human rights, which was traditionally under the purview of the Africa subcommittee.

== Jurisdiction ==
As of the 117th Congress, the subcommittee is one of two primary subcommittees with what the committee calls "functional jurisdiction" (the Africa, Global Health, and Human Rights Subcommittee also enjoys functional jurisdiction, but is primarily a "regional subcommittee"). The functional jurisdiction of the subcommittee allows to provide oversight and conduct investigations or any and all matters within the jurisdiction of the Full Committee, with concurrence of the chairman.

== Members, 118th Congress ==
Majority	Minority
Chris Smith, New Jersey, Chair; María Elvira Salazar, Florida; Amata Coleman Radewagen, American Samoa; French Hill, Arkansas; Rich McCormick, Georgia; John James, Michigan	Susan Wild, Pennsylvania, Ranking Member; Ami Bera, California; Sara Jacobs, California; Kathy Manning, North Carolina

== Historical membership rosters ==
=== 112th Congress ===
Majority	Minority
Dana Rohrabacher, California, Chairman; Ted Poe, Texas, Vice Chair; Mike Kelly, Pennsylvania; Ron Paul, Texas; David Rivera, Florida	Russ Carnahan, Missouri, Ranking Member; David Cicilline, Rhode Island; Karen Bass, California

=== 116th Congress ===
Majority	Minority
Ami Bera, California, Chair; Ilhan Omar, Minnesota; Adriano Espaillat, New York; Ted Lieu, California; Tom Malinowski, New Jersey; David Cicilline, Rhode Island	Lee Zeldin, New York, Ranking Member; Scott Perry, Pennsylvania; Ken Buck, Colorado; Guy Reschenthaler, Pennsylvania

=== 117th Congress ===
Majority	Minority
Joaquin Castro, Texas, Chair; Chrissy Houlahan, Pennsylvania, Vice Chair; Sara Jacobs, California; Brad Sherman, California; Ilhan Omar, Minnesota; Andy Kim, New Jersey	Nicole Malliotakis, New York, Ranking Member; Chris Smith, New Jersey; Darrell Issa, California; Lee Zeldin, New York
