= United States House Foreign Affairs Subcommittee on Africa =

U.S. House committee

Subcommittee of Committee on Foreign Affairs
- Active United States House of Representatives; 119th Congress

Leadership
- Chair: Chris Smith (R)
- Ranking Member: Sara Jacobs (D)

Structure
- Seats: 12 (11 currently filled) 7/7 4/5
- Political parties: Majority (7): Republican (7); Minority (4): Democratic (4)

Meeting place
- 2170, Rayburn House Office Building; Washington, D.C. 20515

Phone number
- (202)-226-8467

The U.S. House Subcommittee on Africa is a subcommittee within the House Foreign Affairs Committee. It was known in previous Congresses as the Subcommittee on Africa, Global Health, Global Human Rights and International Organizations; those matters now have their own subcommittee.

== Jurisdiction ==
The regional oversight focus of the Africa Subcommittee shall align with the area of responsibility of the State Department’s Bureau of African Affairs. This subcommittee shall also have functional jurisdiction over the following: (A) The Office of Foreign Assistance; (B) The Bureau of Global Health Security and Diplomacy; (C) Millennium Challenge Corporation; and (D) The United States Agency for International Development.

== Members, 119th Congress ==
Majority	Minority
Christopher Smith, New Jersey, Chair; Jim Baird, Indiana; María Elvira Salazar, Florida; Ronny Jackson, Texas; Bill Huizenga, Michigan; Amata Coleman Radewagen, American Samoa	Sara Jacobs, California, Ranking Member; Sheila Cherfilus-McCormick, Florida (until April 21, 2026); Jonathan Jackson, Illinois; Pramila Jayapal, Washington; Johnny Olszewski, Maryland

== Historical membership rosters ==
=== 115th Congress ===
Majority	Minority
Christopher Smith, New Jersey, Chairman; Mark Meadows, North Carolina; Dan Donovan, New York; Jim Sensenbrenner, Wisconsin; Tom Garrett Jr., Virginia	Karen Bass, California, Ranking Member; Ami Bera, California; Joaquin Castro, Texas; Thomas Suozzi, New York

=== 116th Congress ===
Majority	Minority
Karen Bass, California, Chair; Susan Wild, Pennsylvania; Dean Phillips, Minnesota; Ilhan Omar, Minnesota; Chrissy Houlahan, Pennsylvania	Christopher Smith, New Jersey, Ranking Member; Jim Sensenbrenner, Wisconsin; Ron Wright, Texas; Tim Burchett, Tennessee

=== 117th Congress ===
Majority	Minority
Karen Bass, California, Chair; Dean Phillips, Minnesota; Ilhan Omar, Minnesota, Vice Chair; Ami Bera, California; Susan Wild, Pennsylvania; Tom Malinowski, New Jersey; Sara Jacobs, California; David Cicilline, Rhode Island	Christopher Smith, New Jersey, Ranking Member; Darrell Issa, California; Greg Steube, Florida; Dan Meuser, Pennsylvania; Young Kim, California; Ronny Jackson, Texas

=== 118th Congress ===
Majority	Minority
John James, Michigan, Chair; Christopher Smith, New Jersey; Young Kim, California; Jim Baird, Indiana; Tom Kean Jr., New Jersey; Cory Mills, Florida	Sara Jacobs, California, Ranking Member; Sheila Cherfilus-McCormick, Florida; Colin Allred, Texas; Jonathan Jackson, Illinois
