= 2018 Pennsylvania's 7th and 15th congressional district special elections =

Special elections for the 7th and 15th congressional districts in Pennsylvania were held on November 6, 2018, following the resignations of Republican U.S. Representatives Pat Meehan (7th district) and Charlie Dent (15th district).

== Impact of redistricting ==
These were the last elections held in either district under their configurations made in 2011 by the Pennsylvania Legislature, as new districts drawn in accordance will the ruling of the Supreme Court of Pennsylvania in League of Women Voters v. Commonwealth of Pennsylvania were in effect for the main 2018 congressional elections in November. The bulk of the old 7th became the new 5th District and the bulk of the old 15th became the new 7th District. In both cases, the two candidates on the ballot for these special elections were also on the ballot for the regular election held on the same day in their respective successor districts.

== District 7 ==
Pennsylvania's 7th congressional district special election, 2018
- November 6, 2018
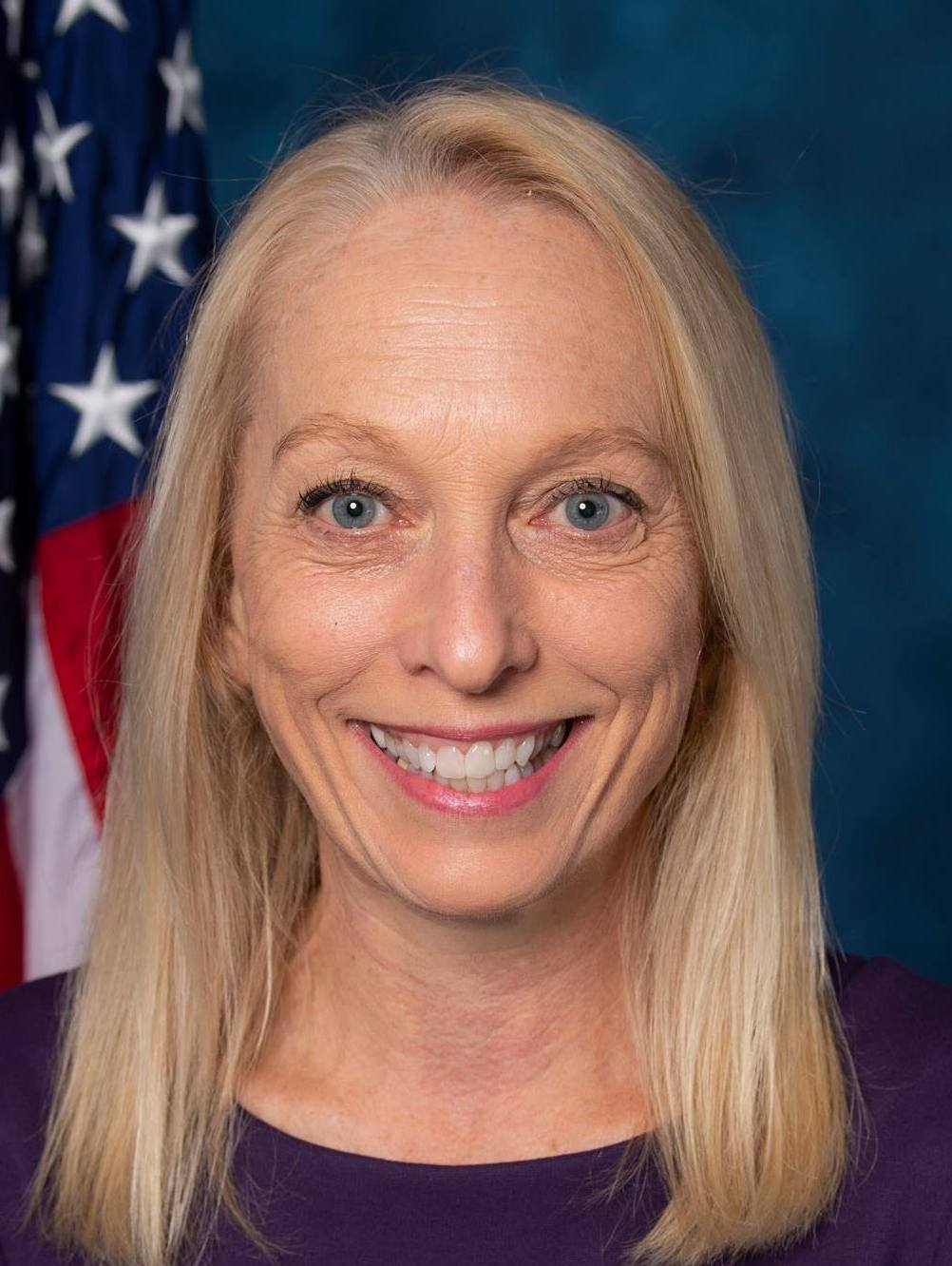

Nominee	Mary Gay Scanlon	Pearl Kim
Party	Democratic	Republican
Popular vote	173,268	152,503
Percentage	52.27%	46.01%
- County results Scanlon: 50–60% Kim: 40–50% 50–60% 70–80%
U.S. Representative before election
Pat Meehan
Republican
Elected U.S. Representative
Mary Gay Scanlon
Democratic

=== Background ===
In January 2018, following revelation that he used taxpayers' money to settle a sexual harassment claim brought by a female staff member, Meehan announced that he would retire from Congress at the end of his current term and not seek reelection in 2018. On April 27, 2018, Meehan resigned and said he would pay back the taxpayer funds used for the settlement.

Pennsylvania's 7th congressional district under the 2011 configuration is located in the Philadelphia metropolitan area and borders Delaware. It includes portions of Berks County, Chester County, Delaware County, Lancaster County and Montgomery County. The district had a Cook PVI score of R+1.

=== Candidates ===
In Pennsylvania, primaries are not held for special congressional elections. Instead, nominees are chosen by party committee members from each of the counties represented in the district.

Republican

- Pearl Kim, former Deputy Attorney General of Pennsylvania and Republican nominee for Pennsylvania's 5th congressional district in 2018

Democratic

- Mary Gay Scanlon, attorney and Democratic nominee for Pennsylvania's 5th congressional district in 2018

Green

- Brianna Johnston, businesswoman

Libertarian

- Sandra Salas, sex worker

=== General election ===
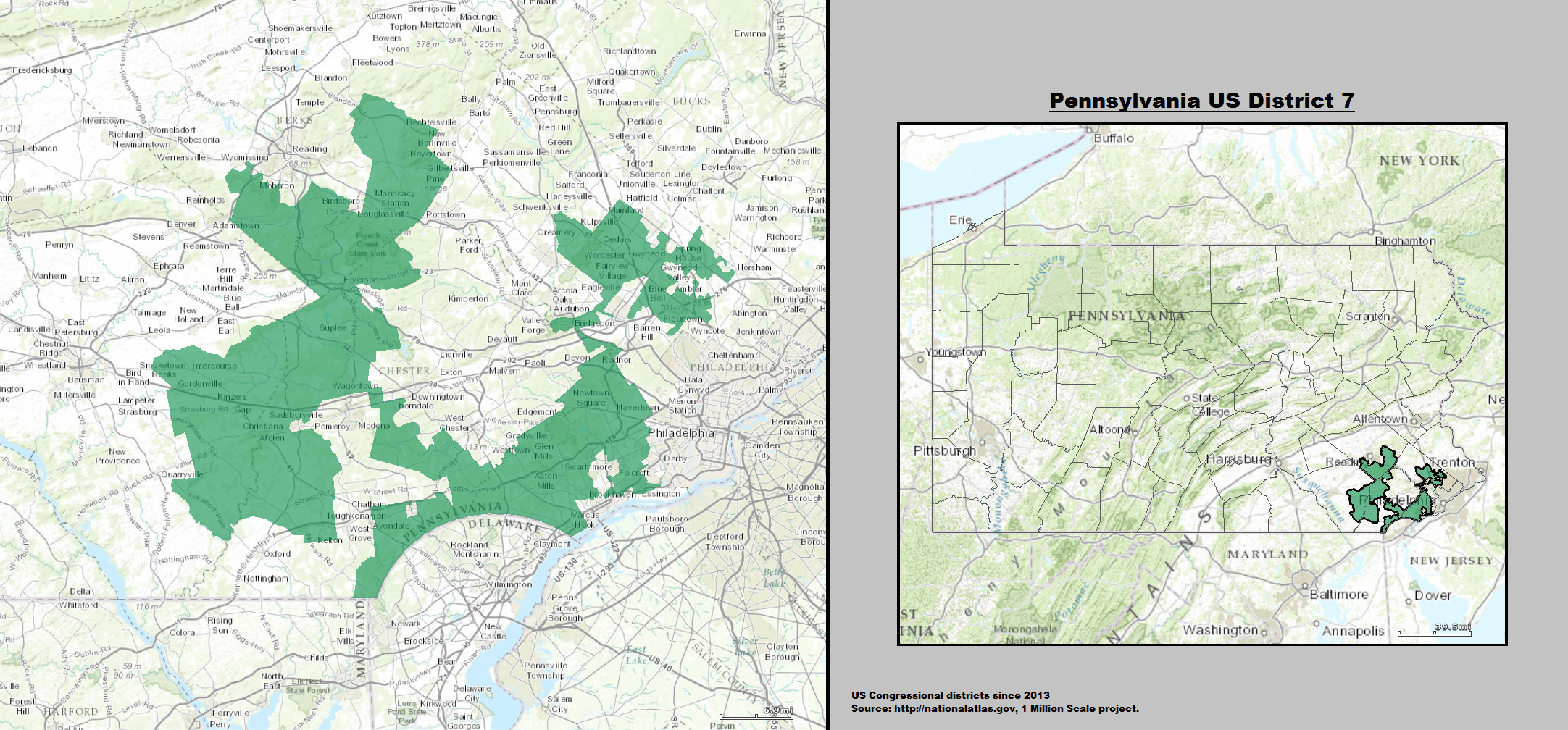
The 7th congressional district's boundaries from January 3, 2013, to January 2019

==== Results ====
Pennsylvania's 7th congressional district, 2018 (special)
Party	Candidate	Votes	%	±%
Democratic	Mary Gay Scanlon	173,268	52.27%	+11.47%
Republican	Pearl Kim	152,503	46.01%	−13.46%
Libertarian	Sandra Teresa Salas	3,177	0.96%	N/A
Green	Brianna Johnston	2,511	0.76%	N/A
Total votes		331,459	100.0%	N/A
Democratic gain from Republican				

==== By county ====
County	Mary Gay Scanlon Democratic		Pearl Kim Republican		All others		Margin		Total votes cast
County	#	%	#	%	#	%	#	%	Total votes cast
Berks (part)	9,703	39.39%	14,148	57.43%	784	3.18%	-4,445	-18.04%	24,635
Chester (part)	22,066	48.12%	22,662	49.42%	1,132	2.47%	-594	-1.30%	45,860
Delaware (part)	100,387	54.46%	81,688	44.32%	2,257	1.23%	18,699	10.14%	184,332
Lancaster (part)	1,780	23.36%	5,644	74.07%	196	2.57%	-3,864	-50.61%	7,620
Montgomery (part)	39,332	56.99%	28,361	41.10%	1,319	1.91%	10,971	15.89%	69,012
Totals	173,268	52.27%	152,503	46.01%	5,688	1.72%	20,765	6.26%	331,459

== District 15 ==
Pennsylvania's 15th congressional district special election, 2018
- November 6, 2018
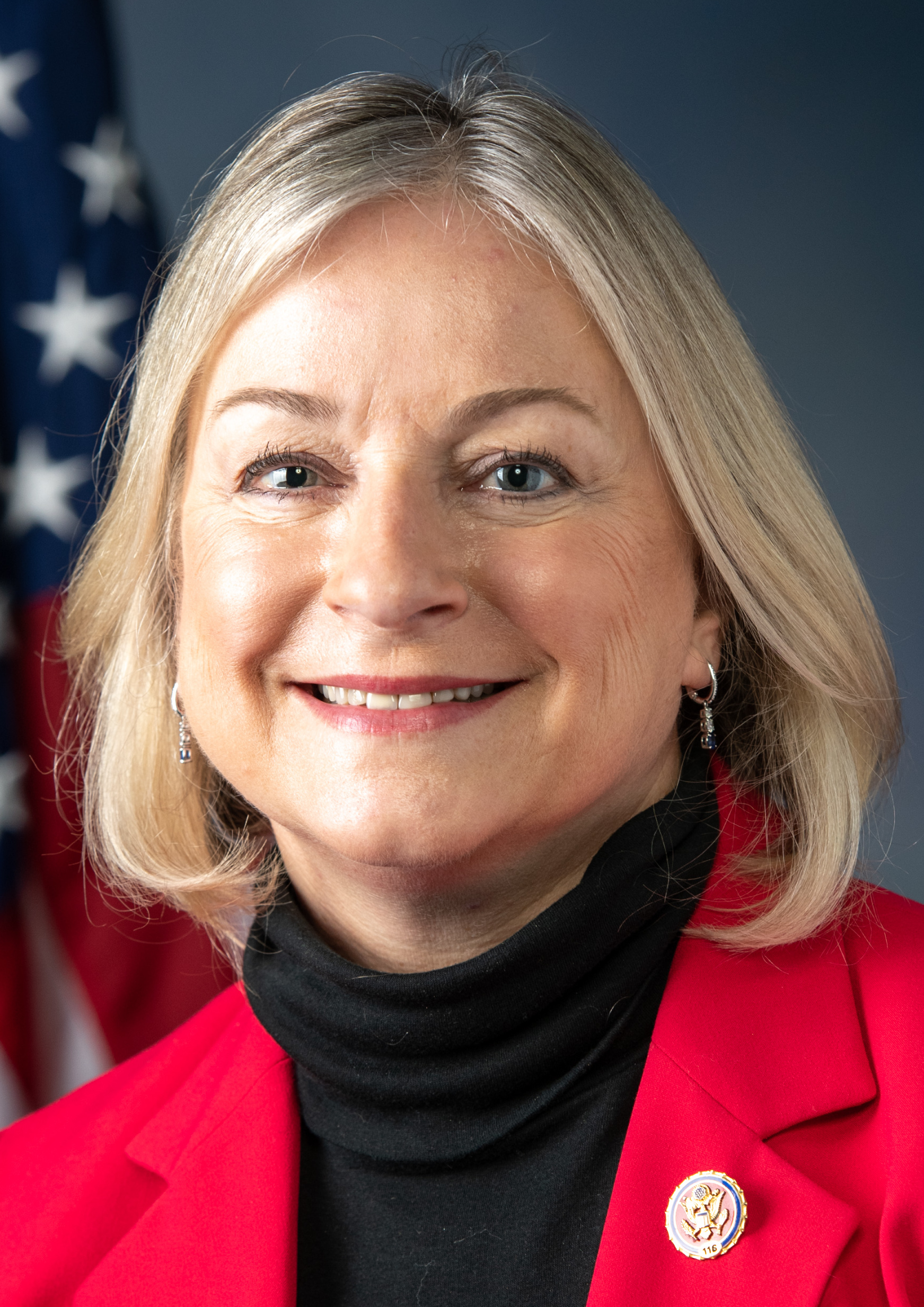

Nominee	Susan Wild	Marty Nothstein
Party	Democratic	Republican
Popular vote	130,353	129,594
Percentage	48.54%	48.26%
- County results Wild: 50–60% Nothstein: 50–60% 60–70%
U.S. Representative before election
Charlie Dent
Republican
Elected U.S. Representative
Susan Wild
Democratic

=== Background ===
In September 2017, Dent announced that he would retire from Congress and not seek re-election to another term in 2018. In April 2018, Dent announced that he would resign in May 2018, not serving out the remainder of his term. He resigned on May 12, 2018, leaving the seat vacant.

In Pennsylvania, primaries are not held for special congressional elections. Instead, nominees are chosen by party members from each of the counties represented in the district. Pennsylvania's 15th congressional district under the 2011 configuration is located in the Lehigh Valley and borders New Jersey. It includes portions of Dauphin County, Lebanon County, Berks County, and Northampton County, and the entirety of Lehigh County. The district had a Cook PVI score of R+4.

=== Candidates ===
Republican

- Marty Nothstein, chairman of the Lehigh County Board of Commissioners and Republican nominee for Pennsylvania's 7th congressional district in 2018

Democratic

- Susan Wild, former Allentown Solicitor and Democratic nominee for Pennsylvania's 7th congressional district in 2018

Libertarian

- Tim Silfies, business reporter for WFMZ-TV and Libertarian nominee for Pennsylvania's 7th congressional district in 2018.

=== General election ===
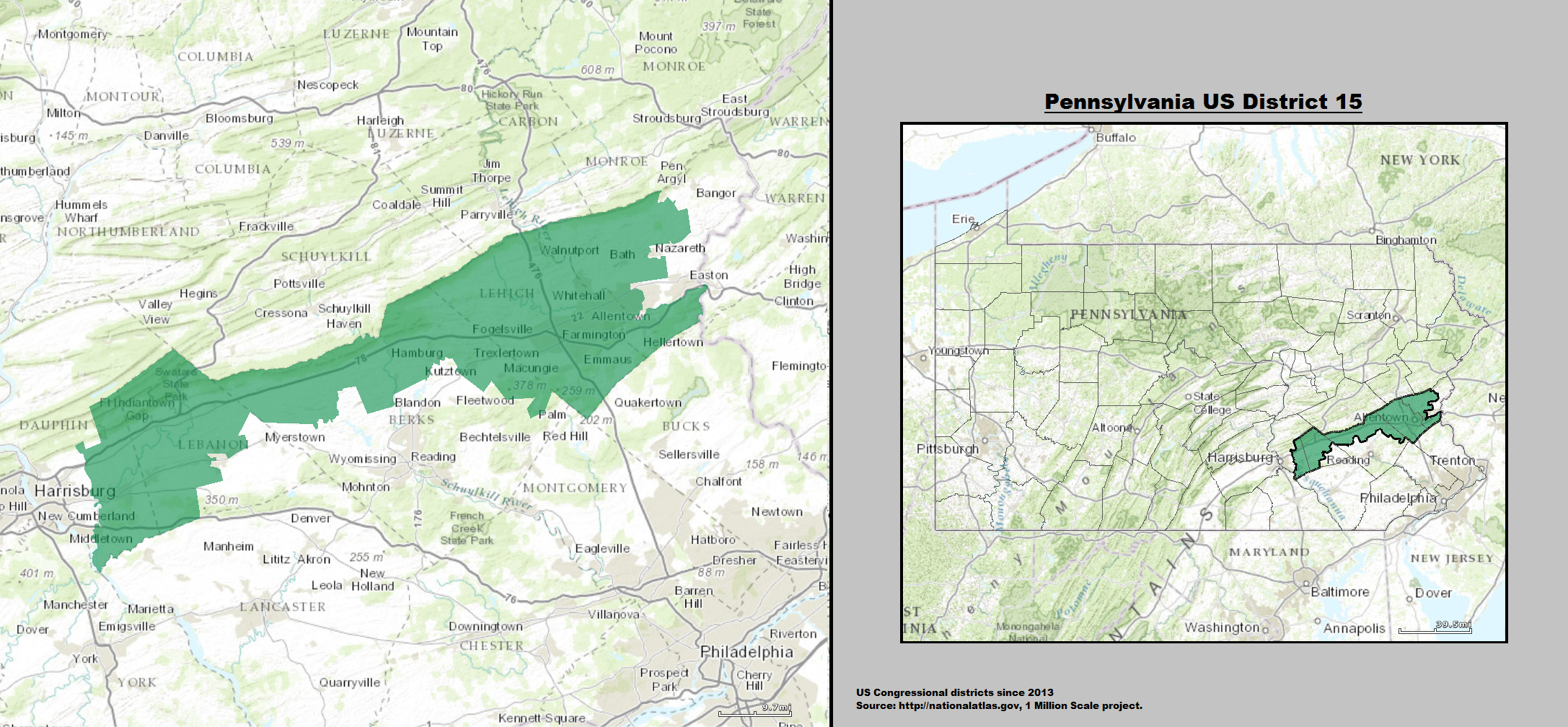
The 15th congressional district's boundaries from January 3, 2013, to January 2019

==== Results ====
Pennsylvania's 15th congressional district, 2018 (special)
Party	Candidate	Votes	%	±%
Democratic	Susan Wild	130,353	48.54%	+10.52%
Republican	Marty Nothstein	129,594	48.26%	−10.13%
Libertarian	Tim Silfies	8,579	3.19%	−0.40%
Total votes		268,526	100.0%	N/A
Democratic gain from Republican				

==== By county ====
County	Susan Wild Democratic		Marty Nothstein Republican		Tim Silfies Libertarian		Margin		Total votes cast
County	#	%	#	%	#	%	#	%	Total votes cast
Berks (part)	12,140	60.70%	7,261	36.31%	599	3.00%	-4,879	-24.39%	20,000
Dauphin (part)	16,090	54.92%	12,615	43.06%	594	2.03%	-3,475	-11.86%	29,299
Lebanon (part)	18,689	64.67%	9,516	32.93%	694	2.40%	-9,173	-31.74%	28,899
Lehigh	54,186	42.24%	69,572	54.24%	4,510	3.52%	15,386	12.00%	128,268
Northampton (part)	28,489	45.91%	31,389	50.58%	2,182	3.52%	2,900	4.67%	62,060
Totals	130,353	48.54%	129,594	48.26%	8,579	3.19%	759	0.28%	268,526
