= United States House Foreign Affairs Subcommittee on Europe =

Committee of the Congress of the United States of America.

Subcommittee of Committee on Foreign Affairs
- Active United States House of Representatives; 119th Congress

Leadership
- Chair: Keith Self (R)
- Ranking Member: Bill Keating (D)

Structure
- Seats: 13 (13 currently filled) 7/7 6/6
- Political parties: Majority (7): Republican (7); Minority (6): Democratic (6)

Meeting place
- 2170, Rayburn House Office Building; Washington, D.C. 20515

Phone number
- (202)-226-8467

The U.S. House Subcommittee on Europe is a subcommittee within the House Foreign Affairs Committee. It was formerly referred to as the Subcommittee on Europe and Emerging Threats, Subcommittee on Europe, the Subcommittee on Europe, Eurasia, Energy and the Environment, and the Subcommittee on Europe, Energy, the Environment and Cyber.

== Jurisdiction ==
The regional oversight focus of the Europe Subcommittee shall align with the area of responsibility of the State Department’s Bureau of European and Eurasian Affairs. This subcommittee shall also have functional jurisdiction over the following: (A) Bureaus and programs of the Under Secretary for Arms Control and International Security; and (B) The Bureau of Cyberspace and Digital Policy.

== Members, 119th Congress ==
Majority	Minority
Keith Self, Texas, Chair; Joe Wilson, South Carolina; Michael McCaul, Texas; Warren Davidson, Ohio; Young Kim, California; Mark Green, Tennessee; Anna Paulina Luna, Florida	Bill Keating, Massachusetts, Ranking Member; Dina Titus, Nevada; Jim Costa, California; Gabe Amo, Rhode Island; Julie Johnson, Texas; Sarah McBride, Delaware

== Historical membership rosters ==
=== 115th Congress ===
Majority	Minority
Dana Rohrabacher, California, Chairman; Joe Wilson, South Carolina; Ted Poe, Texas; Tom Marino, Pennsylvania; Jeff Duncan, South Carolina; Jim Sensenbrenner, Wisconsin; Francis Rooney, Florida; Brian Fitzpatrick, Pennsylvania	Gregory Meeks, New York, Ranking Member; Brad Sherman, California; Albio Sires, New Jersey; Bill Keating, Massachusetts; David Cicilline, Rhode Island; Robin Kelly, Illinois

=== 116th Congress ===
Majority	Minority
Bill Keating, Massachusetts, Chair; Abigail Spanberger, Virginia; Gregory Meeks, New York; Albio Sires, New Jersey; Ted Deutch, Florida; David Cicilline, Rhode Island; Joaquin Castro, Texas; Dina Titus, Nevada; Susan Wild, Pennsylvania; David Trone, Maryland; Jim Costa, California; Vicente Gonzalez, Texas	Adam Kinzinger, Illinois, Ranking Member; Joe Wilson, South Carolina; Ann Wagner, Missouri; Jim Sensenbrenner, Wisconsin; Francis Rooney, Florida; Brian Fitzpatrick, Pennsylvania; Greg Pence, Indiana; Ron Wright, Texas; Michael Guest, Mississippi; Tim Burchett, Tennessee

=== 117th Congress ===
Majority	Minority
Bill Keating, Massachusetts, Chair; Susan Wild, Pennsylvania; Abigail Spanberger, Virginia, Vice Chair; Albio Sires, New Jersey; Ted Deutch, Florida; David Cicilline, Rhode Island; Dina Titus, Nevada; Dean Phillips, Minnesota; Jim Costa, California; Vicente Gonzalez, Texas; Brad Schneider, Illinois	Brian Fitzpatrick, Pennsylvania, Ranking Member; Ann Wagner, Missouri; Adam Kinzinger, Illinois; Brian Mast, Florida; Dan Meuser, Pennsylvania; August Pfluger, Texas; Nicole Malliotakis, New York; Peter Meijer, Michigan

=== 118th Congress ===
Majority	Minority
Tom Kean Jr., New Jersey, Chair; Joe Wilson, South Carolina; Darrell Issa, California; Ann Wagner, Missouri; Bill Huizenga, Michigan; Mike Lawler, New York; Keith Self, Texas	Bill Keating, Massachusetts, Ranking Member; Dina Titus, Nevada; Madeleine Dean, Pennsylvania; Jim Costa, California; Susan Wild, Pennsylvania; Gabe Amo, Rhode Island (from November 13, 2023)
