= United States House Foreign Affairs Subcommittee on East Asia and the Pacific =

The U.S. House Subcommittee on East Asia and the Pacific is a subcommittee within the House Foreign Affairs Committee. Before the 119th Congress it was known as the Subcommittee on the Indo-Pacific. Before the 118th Congress, it was known as the Subcommittee on Asia, the Pacific, Central Asia and Nonproliferation.

== Jurisdiction ==
The regional oversight focus of the Pacific Subcommittee shall align with the area of responsibility of the State Department’s Bureau of East Asian and Pacific Affairs. This subcommittee shall also have functional jurisdiction over the following: (A) Bureaus and programs of the Under Secretary of State for Economic Growth, Energy, and the Environment; and (B) U.S. International Development Finance Corporation.

== Members, 119th Congress ==
Majority	Minority
Young Kim, California, Chair; Andy Barr, Kentucky; Amata Radewagen, American Samoa; Michael McCaul, Texas; James Moylan, Guam; Ryan Mackenzie, Pennsylvania; Sheri Biggs, South Carolina; Ryan Zinke, Montana	Ami Bera, California, Ranking Member; Brad Sherman, California; Joaquin Castro, Texas; Jared Moskowitz, Florida; Gabe Amo, Rhode Island; Johnny Olszewski, Maryland

== Historical membership rosters ==
=== 115th Congress ===
Majority	Minority
Ted Yoho, Florida, Chairman; Dana Rohrabacher, California; Steve Chabot, Ohio; Tom Marino, Pennsylvania; Mo Brooks, Alabama; Scott Perry, Pennsylvania; Adam Kinzinger, Illinois; Ann Wagner, Missouri	Brad Sherman, California, Ranking Member; Ami Bera, California; Dina Titus, Nevada; Gerry Connolly, Virginia; Ted Deutch, Florida; Tulsi Gabbard, Hawaii

=== 116th Congress ===
Majority	Minority
Brad Sherman, California, Chair; Dina Titus, Nevada; Chrissy Houlahan, Pennsylvania; Gerry Connolly, Virginia; Ami Bera, California; Andy Levin, Michigan; Abigail Spanberger, Virginia	Ted Yoho, Florida, Ranking Member; Scott Perry, Pennsylvania; Ann Wagner, Missouri; Brian Mast, Florida; John Curtis, Utah

=== 117th Congress ===
Majority	Minority
Ami Bera, California, Chair; Andy Levin, Michigan, Vice Chair; Brad Sherman, California; Dina Titus, Nevada; Chrissy Houlahan, Pennsylvania; Andy Kim, New Jersey; Gerry Connolly, Virginia; Ted Lieu, California; Abigail Spanberger, Virginia; Kathy Manning, North Carolina	Steve Chabot, Ohio, Ranking Member; Scott Perry, Pennsylvania; Ann Wagner, Missouri; Ken Buck, Colorado; Tim Burchett, Tennessee; Mark E. Green, Tennessee; Andy Barr, Kentucky; Young Kim, California

=== 118th Congress ===
Majority	Minority
Young Kim, California, Chair; Ann Wagner, Missouri; Ken Buck, Colorado; Mark E. Green, Tennessee; Andy Barr, Kentucky; Amata Radewagen, American Samoa; Warren Davidson, Ohio; Mike Waltz, Florida	Ami Bera, California, Ranking Member; Andy Kim, New Jersey; Brad Sherman, California; William Keating, Massachusetts; Gerry Connolly, Virginia; Joaquin Castro, Texas
