= United States House Foreign Affairs Subcommittee on Western Hemisphere =

U.S. House committee

Subcommittee of Committee on Foreign Affairs
- Active United States House of Representatives; 119th Congress

Leadership
- Chair: María Elvira Salazar (R)
- Ranking Member: Joaquín Castro (D)

Structure
- Seats: 14 (13 currently filled) 7/8 6/6
- Political parties: Majority (7): Republican (7); Minority (6): Democratic (6)

Meeting place
- 2170, Rayburn House Office Building; Washington, D.C. 20515

Phone number
- (202)-226-8467

The House Subcommittee on the Western Hemisphere is a subcommittee within the House Foreign Affairs Committee. It was known in previous Congresses as the Subcommittee on the Western Hemisphere, Civilian Security and Trade, and most recently, the Subcommittee on Western Hemisphere, Civilian Security, Migration and International Economic Policy.

== Jurisdiction ==
The regional oversight focus of the Western Hemisphere Subcommittee shall align with the area of responsibility of the State Department’s Bureau of Western Hemisphere Affairs. This subcommittee shall also have functional jurisdiction over the bureaus and programs of the Under Secretary for Civilian Security, Democracy, and Human Rights.

== Members, 119th Congress ==
Majority	Minority
María Elvira Salazar, Florida, Chair; Mark Green, Tennessee; Chris Smith, New Jersey; Cory Mills, Florida; Mike Lawler, New York; Jefferson Shreve, Indiana; Ryan Mackenzie, Pennsylvania; Sheri Biggs, South Carolina	Joaquin Castro, Texas, Ranking Member; Dina Titus, Nevada; Sara Jacobs, California; Greg Stanton, Arizona; Jonathan Jackson, Illinois; Sydney Kamlager-Dove, California

== Historical membership rosters ==
=== 115th Congress ===
Majority	Minority
Jeff Duncan, South Carolina, Chairman; Christopher Smith, New Jersey; Ileana Ros-Lehtinen, Florida; Michael McCaul, Texas; Mo Brooks, Alabama; Ron DeSantis, Florida; Ted Yoho, Florida; Francis Rooney, Florida	Albio Sires, New Jersey, Ranking Member; Joaquin Castro, Texas; Robin Kelly, Illinois; Norma Torres, California; Adriano Espaillat, New York; Gregory Meeks, New York

=== 116th Congress ===
Majority	Minority
Albio Sires, New Jersey, Chair; Gregory Meeks, New York; Joaquin Castro, Texas; Adriano Espaillat, New York; Dean Phillips, Minnesota; Andy Levin, Michigan; Vicente Gonzalez, Texas; Juan Vargas, California	Francis Rooney, Florida, Ranking Member; Christopher Smith, New Jersey; Ted Yoho, Florida; John Curtis, Utah; Ken Buck, Colorado; Michael Guest, Mississippi

=== 117th Congress ===
Majority	Minority
Albio Sires, New Jersey, Chair; Joaquin Castro, Texas; Andy Levin, Michigan; Vicente Gonzalez, Texas; Juan Vargas, California, Vice Chair	Mark Green, Tennessee, Ranking Member; August Pfluger, Texas; María Elvira Salazar, Florida

=== 118th Congress ===
Majority	Minority
María Elvira Salazar, Florida, Chair; Mark Green, Tennessee; Bill Huizenga, Michigan; Warren Davidson, Ohio; Keith Self, Texas; John James, Michigan	Joaquin Castro, Texas, Ranking Member; Greg Stanton, Arizona; Jared Moskowitz, Florida; Sydney Kamlager-Dove, California
