= United States House Committee on Foreign Affairs =

Standing committee of the United States House of Representatives

House Foreign Affairs Committee
Standing committee
- Active United States House of Representatives; 119th Congress

History
- Formed: 1822

Leadership
- Chair: Brian Mast (R); Since January 3, 2025
- Ranking Member: Gregory Meeks (D); Since January 3, 2023

Structure
- Seats: 53 (53 currently filled) 28/28 25/25
- Political parties: Majority (28): Republican (28); Minority (25): Democratic (25)

Jurisdiction
- Policy areas: Foreign policy, aid, diplomacy
- Oversight authority: Department of State; Agency for International Development
- Senate counterpart: Senate Committee on Foreign Relations

Subcommittees
- East Asia and Pacific; Western Hemisphere; Middle East and North Africa; Europe; Africa; Oversight and Intelligence; South and Central Asia

Meeting place
- 2170, Rayburn House Office Building; Washington, D.C. 20515

Website
- foreignaffairs.house.gov (Republican) democrats-foreignaffairs.house.gov (Democratic)

Phone number
- (202)-226-8467

The United States House Committee on Foreign Affairs, also known as the House Foreign Affairs Committee, is a standing committee of the U.S. House of Representatives with jurisdiction over bills and investigations concerning the foreign affairs of the United States. Since 2025, the chair of the Foreign Affairs Committee has been Brian Mast of Florida.

The committee has a broad mandate to oversee legislation regarding the impact of national security developments on foreign policy; war powers, treaties, executive agreements, and military deployments abroad; foreign assistance; arms control; international economic policy; and other matters. Many of its responsibilities are delegated to one of six standing subcommittees, which have jurisdiction over issues related to their respective region in the world. The committee also oversees the U.S. Department of State, American embassies and diplomats, and the U.S. Agency for International Development.

During two separate periods, 1975 to 1978 and 1995 to 2007, the Foreign Affairs Committee was renamed the Committee on International Relations; its duties and jurisdiction remained unchanged.

Its counterpart in the Senate is the Committee on Foreign Relations.

== Members, 119th Congress ==
Majority	Minority
Brian Mast, Florida, Chair; Chris Smith, New Jersey; Joe Wilson, South Carolina; Michael McCaul, Texas; Scott Perry, Pennsylvania; Darrell Issa, California, Vice Chair; Ann Wagner, Missouri; Tim Burchett, Tennessee; Mark Green, Tennessee (until July 20, 2025); Andy Barr, Kentucky; Ronny Jackson, Texas; Young Kim, California; Maria Elvira Salazar, Florida; Bill Huizenga, Michigan; Amata Coleman Radewagen, American Samoa; Warren Davidson, Ohio; Jim Baird, Indiana; Thomas Kean Jr., New Jersey; Mike Lawler, New York; Cory Mills, Florida; Keith Self, Texas; Rich McCormick, Georgia (from April 1, 2025); Ryan Zinke, Montana; James Moylan, Guam; Anna Paulina Luna, Florida; Jefferson Shreve, Indiana; Sheri Biggs, South Carolina; Michael Baumgartner, Washington; Ryan Mackenzie, Pennsylvania; Randy Fine, Florida (from July 22, 2025); Max Miller, Ohio (from March 25, 2026); James Gallagher, California (from June 24, 2026)	Gregory Meeks, New York, Ranking Member; Brad Sherman, California; Gerry Connolly, Virginia (until May 21, 2025); Bill Keating, Massachusetts; Ami Bera, California; Joaquin Castro, Texas; Dina Titus, Nevada; Ted Lieu, California; Sara Jacobs, California; Sheila Cherfilus-McCormick, Florida (until April 21, 2026); Greg Stanton, Arizona; Jared Moskowitz, Florida; Jonathan Jackson, Illinois; Sydney Kamlager-Dove, California; Jim Costa, California; Gabe Amo, Rhode Island, Vice Ranking Member; Kweisi Mfume, Maryland; Pramila Jayapal, Washington; George Latimer, New York; Johnny Olszewski, Maryland; Julie Johnson, Texas; Sarah McBride, Delaware; Brad Schneider, Illinois (from February 25, 2025); Madeleine Dean, Pennsylvania (from February 25, 2025); Debbie Wasserman Schultz, Florida (from June 9, 2026); Mark Pocan, Wisconsin (from June 9, 2026); Wesley Bell, Missouri (from June 9, 2026)

Resolutions electing members: H.Res. 13 (Chair), H.Res. 14 (Ranking Member), H.Res. 42 (R), H.Res. 44 (D), H.Res. 162 (D), H.Res. 283 (McCormick), H.Res. 600 (Fine), H.Res. 1135 (Miller), H.Res. 1352 (D), H.Res. 1381 (R)

== Subcommittees ==
Whereas until the 118th Congress, subcommittees tended to combine jurisdiction over particular regions of the globe with jurisdiction over broader policy areas (e.g. terrorism or energy policy), in the 118th Congress, the subcommittees were reconfigured to strictly focus on geographical areas, with the exception of global issues and international organizations which received their own subcommittee.

Subcommittee	Chair	Ranking Member
Africa	Chris Smith (R-NJ)	Sara Jacobs (D-CA)
East Asia and the Pacific	Young Kim (R-CA)	Ami Bera (D-CA)
Europe	Keith Self (R-TX)	Bill Keating (D-MA)
Middle East and North Africa	Mike Lawler (R-NY)	Sheila Cherfilus-McCormick (D-FL) (until April 21, 2026) Jared Moskowitz (D-FL) (since August 25, 2026)
South and Central Asia	Bill Huizenga (R-MI)	Sydney Kamlager-Dove (D-CA)
Western Hemisphere	María Elvira Salazar (R-FL)	Joaquin Castro (D-TX)
Oversight and Intelligence	Cory Mills (R-FL)	Jared Moskowitz (D-FL) (until August 25, 2026) Jonathan Jackson (D-IL) (since August 25, 2026)

== Leadership ==
Data from the committee's official website.

Chairs
Name	Party	Start	End	State
Jonathan Russell	Democratic-Republican	1821	1823	Massachusetts
John Forsyth	Democratic-Republican	1823	1827	Georgia
Edward Everett	National Republican	1827	1829	Massachusetts
William Archer	Democratic	1829	1834	Virginia
James Wayne	Democratic	1834	1835	Georgia
John Mason	Democratic	1835		Virginia
Benjamin Howard	Democratic	1835	1839	Maryland
Francis Pickens	Democratic	1839	1841	South Carolina
Caleb Cushing	Democratic	1841	1842	Massachusetts
John Quincy Adams	Whig	1842	1843	Massachusetts
Charles Ingersoll	Democratic	1843	1847	Pennsylvania
Truman Smith	Whig	1847	1849	Connecticut
John McClernand	Democratic	1849	1851	Illinois
Thomas Bayly	Democratic	1851	1855	Virginia
Alexander Pennington	Opposition	1855	1857	New Jersey
Thomas Clingman	Democratic	1857	1858	North Carolina
George Hopkins	Democratic	1858	1859	Virginia
Thomas Corwin	Republican	1859	1861	Ohio
John Crittenden	Union Democratic	1861	1863	Kentucky
Henry Davis	Unconditional Union	1863	1865	Maryland
Nathaniel Banks	Republican	1865	1872	Massachusetts
Leonard Myers	Republican	1872	1873	Pennsylvania
Godlove Orth	Republican	1873	1875	Indiana
Thomas Swann	Democratic	1875	1879	Maryland
Samuel Cox	Democratic	1879	1881	New York
Charles Williams	Republican	1881	1883	Wisconsin
Andrew Curtin	Democratic	1883	1885	Pennsylvania
Perry Belmont	Democratic	1885	1888	New York
James McCreary	Democratic	1888	1889	Kentucky
Robert Hitt	Republican	1889	1891	Illinois
James Blount	Democratic	1891	1893	Georgia
James McCreary	Democratic	1893	1895	Kentucky
Robert Hitt	Republican	1895	1906	Illinois
Robert Cousins	Republican	1907	1909	Iowa
James Perkins	Republican	1909	1910	New York
David Foster	Republican	1910	1911	Vermont
William Sulzer	Democratic	1911	1912	New York
Charles Smith	Democratic	1912	1913	New York
Henry Flood	Democratic	1913	1919	Virginia
Stephen Porter	Republican	1919	1930	Pennsylvania
Henry Temple	Republican	1930	1931	Pennsylvania
John Linthicum	Democratic	1931	1932	Maryland
Sam McReynolds	Democratic	1932	1939	Tennessee
Sol Bloom	Democratic	1939	1947	New York
Charles Eaton	Republican	1947	1949	New Jersey
Sol Bloom	Democratic	1949		New York
John Kee	Democratic	1949	1951	West Virginia
James Richards	Democratic	1951	1953	South Carolina
Robert Chiperfield	Republican	1953	1955	Illinois
James Richards	Democratic	1955	1957	South Carolina
Thomas Gordon	Democratic	1957	1959	Illinois
Thomas Morgan	Democratic	1959	1977	Pennsylvania
Clement Zablocki	Democratic	1977	1983	Wisconsin
Dante Fascell	Democratic	1983	1993	Florida
Lee Hamilton	Democratic	1993	1995	Indiana
Benjamin Gilman	Republican	1995	2001	New York
Henry Hyde	Republican	2001	2007	Illinois
Tom Lantos	Democratic	2007	2008	California
Howard Berman	Democratic	2008	2011	California
Ileana Ros-Lehtinen	Republican	2011	2013	Florida
Ed Royce	Republican	2013	2019	California
Eliot Engel	Democratic	2019	2021	New York
Gregory Meeks	Democratic	2021	2023	New York
Michael McCaul	Republican	2023	2025	Texas
Brian Mast	Republican	2025	present	Florida

Ranking members
Name	Party	Start	End	State
Sol Bloom	Democratic	1947	1949	New York
Charles Eaton	Republican	1949	1953	New Jersey
James Richards	Democratic	1953	1955	South Carolina
Robert Chiperfield	Republican	1953	1963	Illinois
Frances Bolton	Republican	1963	1969	Ohio
Ross Adair	Republican	1969	1971	Indiana
William Mailliard	Republican	1971	1974	California
John Erlenborn	Republican	1974	1975	Illinois
William Broomfield	Republican	1975	1993	Michigan
Benjamin Gilman	Republican	1993	1995	New York
Lee Hamilton	Democratic	1995	1999	Indiana
Sam Gejdenson	Democratic	1999	2001	Connecticut
Tom Lantos	Democratic	2001	2007	California
Ileana Ros-Lehtinen	Republican	2007	2011	Florida
Howard Berman	Democratic	2011	2013	California
Eliot Engel	Democratic	2013	2019	New York
Michael McCaul	Republican	2019	2023	Texas
Gregory Meeks	Democratic	2023	present	New York

== Previous rosters ==
=== 118th Congress ===
Majority	Minority
Michael McCaul, Texas, Chair; Chris Smith, New Jersey; Joe Wilson, South Carolina; Scott Perry, Pennsylvania; Darrell Issa, California; Ann Wagner, Missouri, Vice Chair; Brian Mast, Florida; Ken Buck, Colorado (until March 22, 2024); Tim Burchett, Tennessee; Mark Green, Tennessee; Andy Barr, Kentucky; Ronny Jackson, Texas; Young Kim, California; Maria Elvira Salazar, Florida; Bill Huizenga, Michigan; Amata Coleman Radewagen, American Samoa; French Hill, Arkansas; Warren Davidson, Ohio; Jim Baird, Indiana; Mike Waltz, Florida; Thomas Kean Jr., New Jersey; Mike Lawler, New York; Cory Mills, Florida; Rich McCormick, Georgia; Nathaniel Moran, Texas; John James, Michigan; Keith Self, Texas	Gregory Meeks, New York, Ranking Member; Brad Sherman, California; Gerry Connolly, Virginia; Bill Keating, Massachusetts; David Cicilline, Rhode Island (until May 31, 2023); Ami Bera, California; Joaquin Castro, Texas; Dina Titus, Nevada; Ted Lieu, California; Susan Wild, Pennsylvania; Dean Phillips, Minnesota; Colin Allred, Texas; Andy Kim, New Jersey; Sara Jacobs, California; Kathy Manning, North Carolina, Vice Ranking Member; Sheila Cherfilus-McCormick, Florida; Greg Stanton, Arizona; Madeleine Dean, Pennsylvania; Jared Moskowitz, Florida; Jonathan Jackson, Illinois; Sydney Kamlager-Dove, California; Jim Costa, California; Jason Crow, Colorado; Gabe Amo, Rhode Island (from November 15, 2023); Brad Schneider, Illinois (from March 8, 2023)

Resolutions electing members: H.Res. 14 (Chair), H.Res. 15 (Ranking Member), H.Res. 80 (R), H.Res. 87 (D), H.Res. 76 (removing Omar), H.Res. 102 (D), H.Res. 205 (D), H.Res. 871 (D)

Subcommittees

Subcommittee	Chair	Ranking Member
Africa	John James (R-MI)	Sara Jacobs (D-CA)
Europe	Thomas Kean Jr. (R-NJ)	Bill Keating (D-MA)
The Indo-Pacific	Young Kim (R-CA)	Ami Bera (D-CA)
The Middle East, North Africa and Central Asia	Joe Wilson (R-SC)	Dean Phillips (D-MN)
Western Hemisphere	Maria Elvira Salazar (R-FL)	Joaquin Castro (D-TX)
Global Health, Global Human Rights and International Organizations	Chris Smith (R-NJ)	Susan Wild (D-PA)
Oversight and Accountability	Brian Mast (R-FL)	Jason Crow (D-CO)

=== 117th Congress ===
Majority	Minority
Gregory Meeks, New York, Chair; Brad Sherman, California; Albio Sires, New Jersey; Gerry Connolly, Virginia; Ted Deutch, Florida; Karen Bass, California; Bill Keating, Massachusetts; David Cicilline, Rhode Island; Ami Bera, California; Joaquin Castro, Texas; Dina Titus, Nevada; Ted Lieu, California; Susan Wild, Pennsylvania; Dean Phillips, Minnesota; Ilhan Omar, Minnesota; Colin Allred, Texas; Andy Levin, Michigan; Abigail Spanberger, Virginia; Chrissy Houlahan, Pennsylvania; Tom Malinowski, New Jersey, Vice Chair; Andy Kim, New Jersey; Sara Jacobs, California; Kathy Manning, North Carolina; Sheila Cherfilus-McCormick, Florida (since November 15, 2022); Jim Costa, California; Juan Vargas, California; Vicente Gonzalez, Texas; Brad Schneider, Illinois	Michael McCaul, Texas, Ranking Member; Chris Smith, New Jersey; Steve Chabot, Ohio; Joe Wilson, South Carolina; Scott Perry, Pennsylvania; Darrell Issa, California; Adam Kinzinger, Illinois; Lee Zeldin, New York; Ann Wagner, Missouri, Vice Ranking Member; Brian Mast, Florida; Brian Fitzpatrick, Pennsylvania; Ken Buck, Colorado; Ron Wright, Texas (until February 7, 2021); Tim Burchett, Tennessee; Mark Green, Tennessee; Andy Barr, Kentucky; Greg Steube, Florida; Dan Meuser, Pennsylvania; Claudia Tenney, New York; August Pfluger, Texas; Nicole Malliotakis, New York; Peter Meijer, Michigan; Ronny Jackson, Texas; Young Kim, California; Maria Elvira Salazar, Florida

Resolutions electing members: H.Res. 9 (Chair), H.Res. 10 (Ranking Member), H.Res. 62 (D), H.Res. 63 (R), H.Res. 146 (R), H.Res. 1471 (D)

Subcommittees

Subcommittee	Chair	Ranking Member
Africa, Global Health and Global Human Rights	Karen Bass (D-CA)	Chris Smith (R-NJ)
Asia, the Pacific, Central Asia and Nonproliferation	Ami Bera (D-CA)	Steve Chabot (R-OH)
Europe, Energy, the Environment and Cyber	Bill Keating (D-MA)	Brian Fitzpatrick (R-PA)
Middle East, North Africa and Global Counterterrorism	Ted Deutch (D-FL)	Joe Wilson (R-SC)
International Development, International Organizations and Global Corporate Social Impact	Joaquin Castro (D-TX)	Nicole Malliotakis (R-NY)
Western Hemisphere, Civilian Security, Migration and International Economic Policy	Albio Sires (D-NJ)	Mark Green (R-TN)

=== 116th Congress ===
Majority	Minority
Eliot Engel, New York, Chair; Brad Sherman, California; Gregory Meeks, New York; Albio Sires, New Jersey; Gerry Connolly, Virginia; Ted Deutch, Florida; Karen Bass, California; Bill Keating, Massachusetts; David Cicilline, Rhode Island; Ami Bera, California; Joaquin Castro, Texas, Vice Chair; Dina Titus, Nevada; Adriano Espaillat, New York; Ted Lieu, California; Susan Wild, Pennsylvania; Dean Phillips, Minnesota; Ilhan Omar, Minnesota; Colin Allred, Texas; Andy Levin, Michigan; Abigail Spanberger, Virginia; Chrissy Houlahan, Pennsylvania; Tom Malinowski, New Jersey; David Trone, Maryland; Jim Costa, California; Juan Vargas, California; Vicente Gonzalez, Texas	Michael McCaul, Texas, Ranking Member; Chris Smith, New Jersey; Steve Chabot, Ohio; Joe Wilson, South Carolina; Scott Perry, Pennsylvania; Ted Yoho, Florida; Adam Kinzinger, Illinois; Lee Zeldin, New York; Jim Sensenbrenner, Wisconsin; Ann Wagner, Missouri, Vice Ranking Member; Brian Mast, Florida; Francis Rooney, Florida; Brian Fitzpatrick, Pennsylvania; John Curtis, Utah; Ken Buck, Colorado; Ron Wright, Texas; Guy Reschenthaler, Pennsylvania; Tim Burchett, Tennessee; Greg Pence, Indiana; Steve Watkins, Kansas; Michael Guest, Mississippi; Mark Green, Tennessee (since July 30, 2020)

Sources: H.Res. 24 (Chair), H.Res. 25 (Ranking Member), H.Res. 57 (D), H.Res. 68 (R), H.Res. 1072 (R)

Subcommittees

Subcommittee	Chair	Ranking Member
Africa, Global Health, Global Human Rights, and International Organizations	Karen Bass (D-CA)	Chris Smith (R-NJ)
Asia, the Pacific and Nonproliferation	Ami Bera (D-CA)	Ted Yoho (R-FL)
Europe, Eurasia, Energy, and the Environment	Bill Keating (D-MA)	Adam Kinzinger (R-IL)
Middle East, North Africa and International Terrorism	Ted Deutch (D-FL)	Joe Wilson (R-SC)
Oversight and Investigations	Joaquin Castro (D-TX)	Lee Zeldin (R-NY)
Western Hemisphere, Civilian Security, and Trade	Albio Sires (D-NJ)	Francis Rooney (R-FL)

=== 115th Congress ===
Majority	Minority
Ed Royce, California, Chair; Chris Smith, New Jersey; Ileana Ros-Lehtinen, Florida; Dana Rohrabacher, California; Steve Chabot, Ohio; Joe Wilson, South Carolina; Michael McCaul, Texas; Ted Poe, Texas; Darrell Issa, California; Tom Marino, Pennsylvania; Mo Brooks, Alabama; Paul Cook, California; Scott Perry, Pennsylvania; Ron DeSantis, Florida; Mark Meadows, North Carolina; Ted Yoho, Florida; Adam Kinzinger, Illinois; Lee Zeldin, New York; Dan Donovan, New York; Jim Sensenbrenner, Wisconsin; Ann Wagner, Missouri; Brian Mast, Florida; Francis Rooney, Florida, Vice Chair; Brian Fitzpatrick, Pennsylvania; Tom Garrett, Virginia; John Curtis, Utah	Eliot Engel, New York, Ranking Member; Brad Sherman, California; Gregory Meeks, New York; Albio Sires, New Jersey; Gerry Connolly, Virginia; Ted Deutch, Florida; Karen Bass, California; William R. Keating, Massachusetts; David Cicilline, Rhode Island; Ami Bera, California, Vice Ranking Member; Lois Frankel, Florida; Tulsi Gabbard, Hawaii; Joaquin Castro, Texas; Robin Kelly, Illinois; Brendan Boyle, Pennsylvania; Dina Titus, Nevada; Norma Torres, California; Brad Schneider, Illinois; Tom Suozzi, New York; Adriano Espaillat, New York; Ted Lieu, California

Sources: H.Res. 6 (Chair), H.Res. 7 (Ranking Member), H.Res. 45 (D), H.Res. 51 (R) and H.Res. 52 (D)

== See also ==
- List of United States House of Representatives committees
- Bureau of Legislative Affairs
