= United States House Foreign Affairs Subcommittee on South and Central Asia =

Standing subcommittee in the United States House Committee on Foreign Affairs

Subcommittee of Committee on Foreign Affairs
- Active United States House of Representatives; 119th Congress

Leadership
- Chair: Bill Huizenga (R)
- Ranking Member: Sydney Kamlager-Dove (D)

Structure
- Seats: 14 (13 currently filled) 7/8 6/6
- Political parties: Majority (7): Republican (7); Minority (6): Democratic (6)

Meeting place
- 2170, Rayburn House Office Building; Washington, D.C. 20515

Phone number
- (202)-226-8467

The Subcommittee on South and Central Asia is a standing subcommittee in the United States House Committee on Foreign Affairs. It was established for the 119th United States Congress.

== Jurisdiction ==
The regional oversight focus of the Asia Subcommittee shall align with the area of responsibility of the State Department's Bureau of South and Central Asian Affairs. This subcommittee shall also have functional jurisdiction over the following: (A) Bureaus and programs of the Under Secretary of State for Public Diplomacy and Public Affairs; and (B) The Peace Corps.

== Members, 119th Congress ==
Majority	Minority
Bill Huizenga, Michigan, Chair; Tim Burchett, Tennessee; Scott Perry, Pennsylvania; Keith Self, Texas; Thomas Kean Jr., New Jersey; James Moylan, Guam; Jefferson Shreve, Indiana; Michael Baumgartner, Washington	Sydney Kamlager-Dove, California, Ranking Member; Ami Bera, California; Kweisi Mfume, Maryland; Pramila Jayapal, Washington; Julie Johnson, Texas; George Latimer, New York
