= Crucial Communism Teaching Act =

Proposed U.S. bill

- Long title: To develop and disseminate a civic education curriculum and oral history resources regarding certain political ideologies, and for other purposes.
- Announced in: the 118th United States Congress
- Number of co-sponsors: 33

Legislative history
- Introduced in the House of Representatives as H.R.5349 by Maria Elvira Salazar (R–FL) on September 5, 2023; Committee consideration by United States House Committee on Education and the Workforce; Passed the U.S. House of Representatives on December 6, 2024 (327–62)

The Crucial Communism Teaching Act was a proposed United States law that would develop a high school curriculum with the purpose of teaching students about the history and claimed dangers of communism. Introduced by Representative María Elvira Salazar (R–FL) in the 118th Congress, the bill passed the House by a vote of 327–62 on December 6, 2024.

According to The Intercept, the bill oversimplifies the history of communism and overlooked the history of anti-communism in the United States.

== Controversy ==
The Intercept has said that the bill is intended to spread anti-communist ideology, calling it reminiscent of the era of McCarthyism.
