= María Elvira Salazar =

American journalist and politician (born 1961)

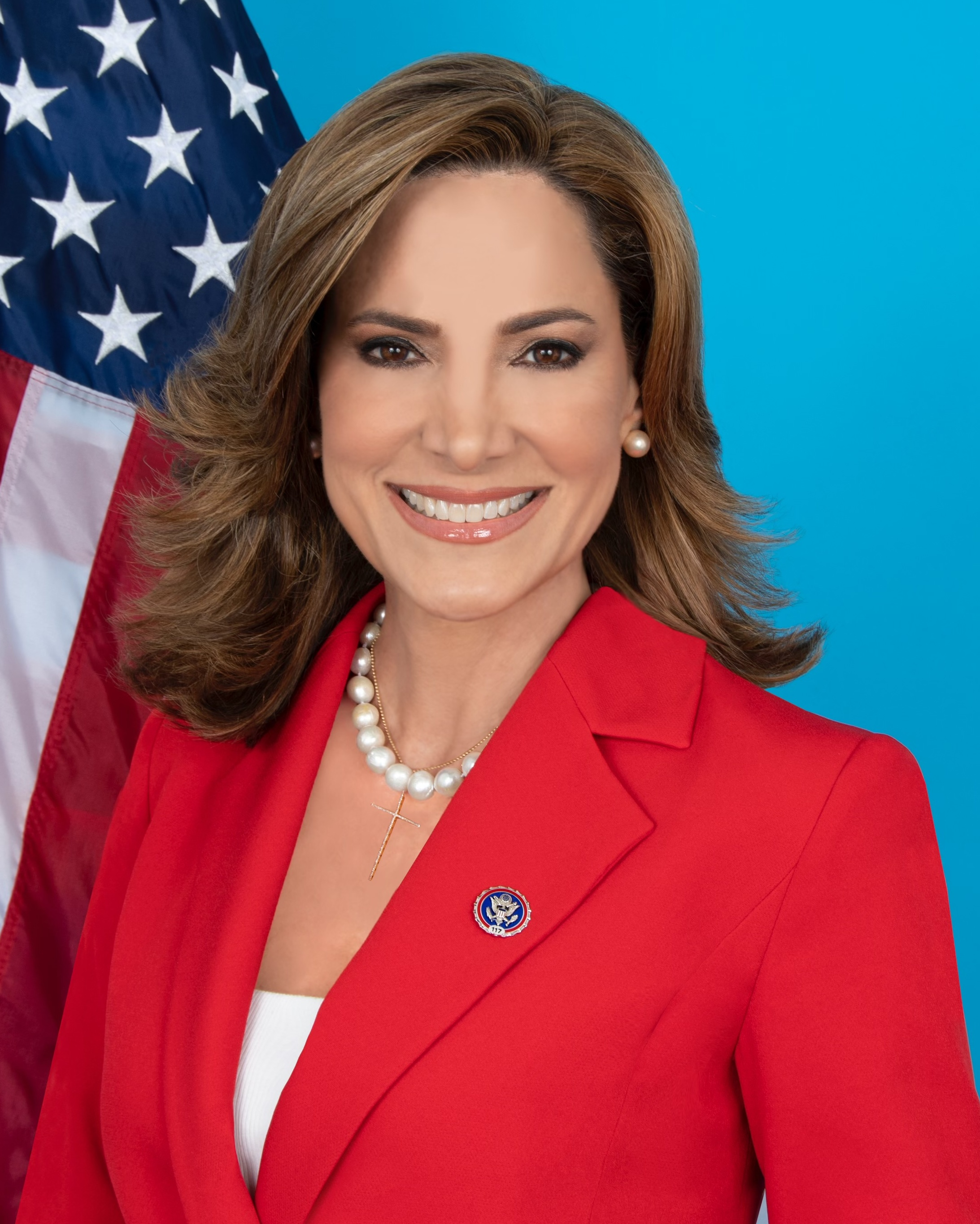
- Official portrait, 2021

Member of the U.S. House of Representatives from Florida's 27th district
- Incumbent
- Assumed office January 3, 2021
- Preceded by: Donna Shalala

Personal details
- Born: November 1, 1961 (age 65) Miami, Florida, U.S.
- Party: Republican
- Spouse(s): Renzo Maietto (m. 1999; div. 2010) Lester Woerner (m. 2022; div. 2024)
- Children: 2
- Education: Miami Dade College (attended); University of Miami (BA); Harvard University (MPA)
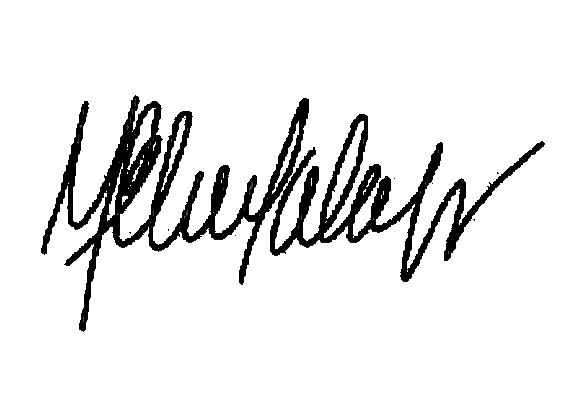
- Signature
- Website: House website Campaign website
- Salazar's voice Salazar supporting the RENACER Act. Recorded November 23, 2021

María Elvira Salazar (Note: /ɛlˈvaɪrə ˈsæləzɑːr/ el-VY-rə SAL-ə-zar; Latin American Spanish: [maˈɾia elˈbiɾa salaˈsaɾ]) (born November 1, 1961) is an American journalist, author, and politician serving as the U.S. representative for Florida's 27th congressional district since 2021. She is a Republican assistant whip. Before entering politics, Salazar worked for the Spanish-language network Telemundo for three decades, after serving as a news anchor for Miami-based WSBS TV. She has also worked for CNN Español and Univision.

Salazar was the Republican nominee for Florida's 27th congressional district in 2018, losing to Donna Shalala. In 2020, she defeated Shalala in a rematch. Salazar was re-elected in 2022, 2024, and 2026.

== Early life and education ==
Salazar was born in Miami's Little Havana neighborhood, the daughter of Cuban exiles. She grew up bilingual, speaking both Spanish and English. She spent part of her childhood in Puerto Rico.

Salazar studied at the Deerborne School of Coral Gables and graduated from Miami Dade College. In 1983, she earned a Bachelor of Arts degree in communications from the University of Miami. In 1995, she received a Master of Public Administration from the Harvard Kennedy School.

== Journalism ==
Salazar's journalism career began in 1983 as a general assignment reporter for the Miami television station WLTV-DT. In 1984, she served as senior political correspondent for the National News in Spanish television in the U.S. for the Spanish International Network, which later became Univision. In 1988, she began working as a White House and Pentagon correspondent for Univision. In 1991, she became the bureau chief at the Central America division of Univision while covering the Salvadoran Civil War.

In 1993, Salazar started working for the Telemundo Network, serving later as senior political correspondent for Telemundo in Cuba. In 1995, she interviewed Fidel Castro for Telemundo at the Cuban mission to the United Nations. She is said to have been the only U.S. Spanish-language television journalist to interview Castro one-on-one.

In 1996, Salazar was one of the two Hispanic journalists to participate in the only political debate in the 50 years after the Cuban revolution between two politically active figures: Ricardo Alarcón, the president of the National Cuban Assembly, and Jorge Mas Canosa, the founder and president of the Cuban American National Foundation and one of the most famous supporters of the anti-Castro movement.

Salazar worked at Telemundo until 2002, when she continued her career as a journalist with America TV 41 with her own political news show, Maria Elvira Confronta.

In 2006, Raúl Alarcón, owner of Spanish Broadcasting System, purchased Key West television station WSBS-TV and changed its name to Mega TV. Salazar changed the name of her program to Polos Opuestos under the new owners. She maintained the debate dynamic of her show, but renamed it Maria Elvira Live!

Salazar interviewed several individuals portrayed by actors in the telenovela Pablo Escobar: The Drug Lord, including the imprisoned Escobar lieutenant John Jairo Velásquez.

Salazar has said that after her interview with Castro, her second-biggest TV interview was with the former Chilean president, Augusto Pinochet, in 2003. Chilean judge Juan Guzman cited the interview as a legal basis to rule Pinochet "mentally competent to stand trial for human rights violations".

In 2013, Salazar interviewed Cuban dissident and blogger Yoani Sánchez in New York City.

Salazar has interviewed several public figures, including presidents Bill Clinton and George W. Bush, Mexican presidents Vicente Fox and Carlos Salinas de Gortari, Spanish president José María Aznar, and Colombian presidents Álvaro Uribe and Juan Manuel Santos.

Salazar has appeared as a guest on Fox News television programs such as Fox & Friends, The O'Reilly Factor, Tucker Carlson Tonight, Hannity, and The Ingraham Angle, as well as Mornings with Maria on Fox Business and on the conservative network Newsmax.

In 2016, Salazar returned to Mega TV as anchor of the night newscast.

== U.S. House of Representatives ==
=== Elections ===
==== 2018 ====
The Miami Herald reported in January 2018 that retiring congresswoman Ileana Ros-Lehtinen, a Republican who had represented Florida's 27th congressional district since 1989, had met with Salazar. Ros-Lehtinen said that her district was "totally winnable for the right candidate" from the Republican Party, adding that Salazar "could be the right candidate."

In March 2018, Salazar announced her candidacy to represent the district, which includes Miami Beach, most of Miami, Kendall, and parts of coastal south Dade County. The traditionally Republican district, which included wealthy communities like Miami Beach, Key Biscayne and Coral Gables as well as Little Havana in Miami, had been trending Democratic in recent years.

Salazar's Republican primary opponent, Dade County commissioner Bruno Barreiro, criticized her for her 1995 interview with Fidel Castro, in which she called Castro a "comandante", as well as a 2016 appearance on Fox News where she called Barack Obama's rapprochement with Cuba "noble". Salazar called Barreiro's attack advertising "defamatory", stating that "I have been one of the staunchest, most hardest critics of the Cuban Revolution on the air."

On August 28, 2018, Salazar won the Republican primary by a margin of about 15 points over leading rival Barreiro. Former Bill Clinton cabinet member Donna Shalala won the Democratic nomination for the seat. The only debates held during the general election campaign were in Spanish. While Shalala did not speak Spanish and used an interpreter, giving Salazar an advantage, each candidate declined opportunities to debate the other in English due to scheduling conflicts. Although Hillary Clinton had won the district by almost 20 points in 2016—Clinton's best showing in a Republican-held district—polling as late as a month before Election Day showed Salazar either narrowly ahead or statistically tied with Shalala. Salazar narrowly lost to Shalala, who received about 52% of the vote.

==== 2020 ====
In August 2019, Salazar announced her candidacy to run in a rematch against Shalala. She was endorsed by President Donald Trump, won the August 2020 Republican primary, and faced Shalala in the November general election. The Cook Political Report, as well as various polling firms, classified the seat as "Likely Democratic", but Salazar won 51.4% to 48.6%. She was one of 19 new Republican women elected to the House of Representatives in the 2020 elections. Shalala attributed Salazar's strength to the potency of the latter's socialism attacks among Miami's Cuban population, aided by Shalala having called herself a "pragmatic socialist".

=== Tenure ===
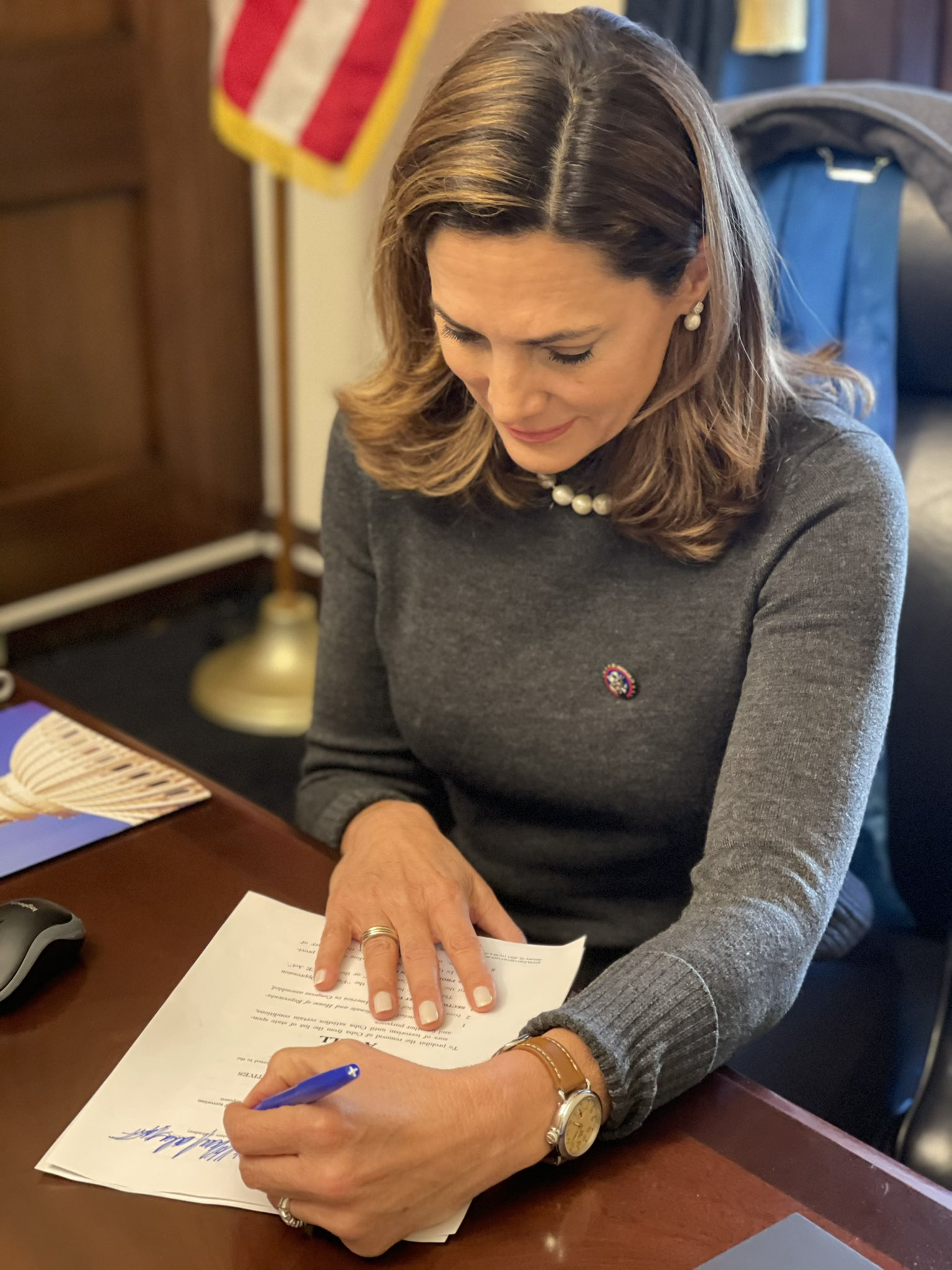
Salazar introducing the Fighting Oppression until the Reign of Castro Ends (FORCE) Act in January 2021.

In late 2020, Salazar was identified as a potential member of the "Freedom Force", a group of incoming Republican House members who said that they were "fighting against socialism in America". Due to her COVID-19 quarantine, she missed voting on certifying the 2020 presidential election results in the House on January 6, 2021. On January 12, the day she was sworn in to Congress, she voted against removing Trump via the Twenty-fifth Amendment. On January 13, she voted against Trump's second impeachment.

On February 4, 2021, Salazar was one of 11 Republicans who voted to strip Marjorie Taylor Greene of her House Education and Labor Committee and House Budget Committee assignments in response to controversial statements she had made about the Parkland and Sandy Hook school shootings, among other things. Salazar released a statement on her vote saying in part, "as I have repeatedly criticized Ilhan Omar for her anti-Semitic comments, I had to hold Marjorie Taylor Greene accountable for her denial of the Parkland Massacre, the Flight 77 crash, and accusing a Jewish family of starting the California wildfires. From now on, I will hold every Democrat to this new standard that they have created."

On May 19, 2021, Salazar joined 34 other Republicans and all Democrats in voting to approve the creation of the January 6 commission.

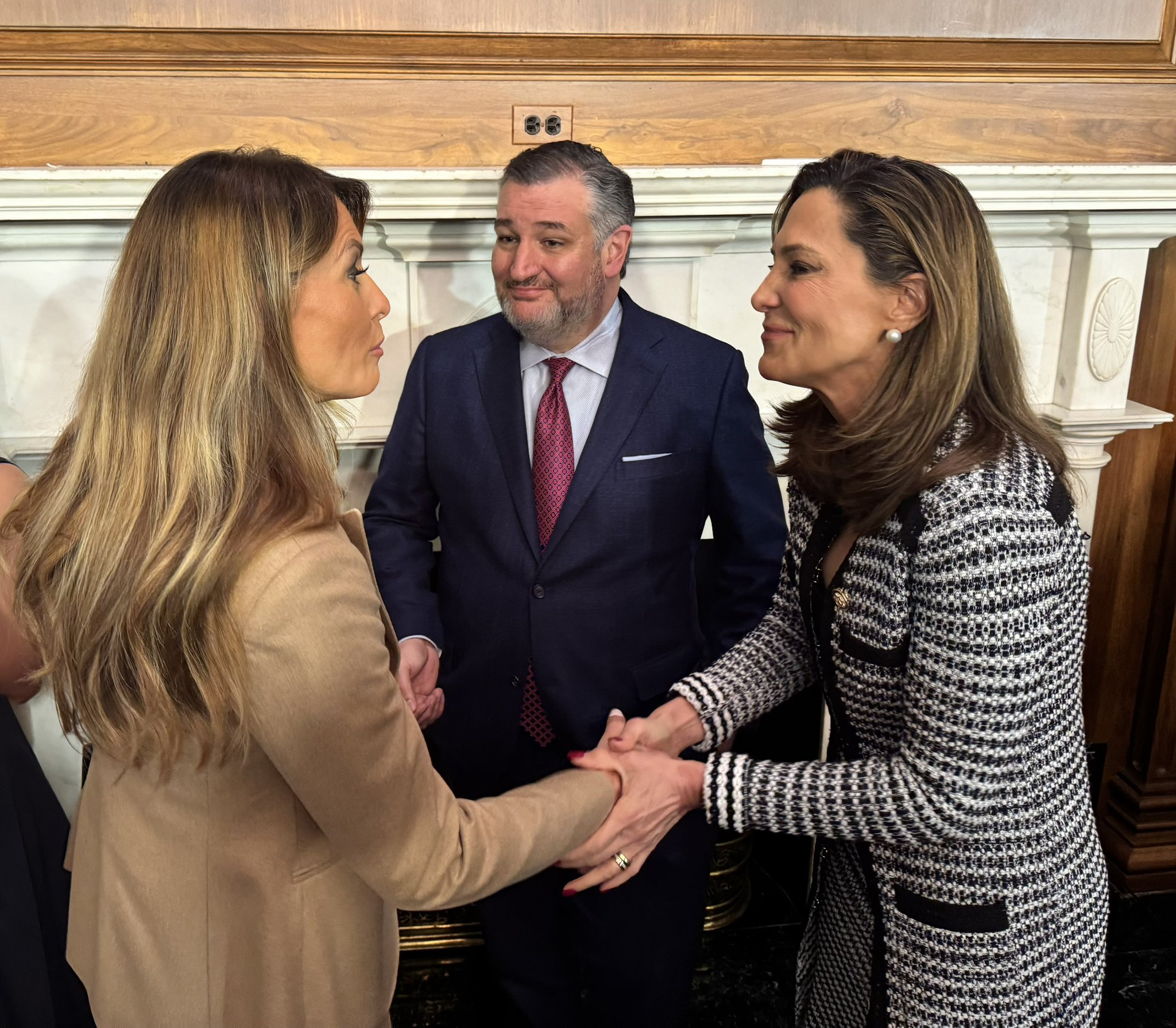
Salazar with First Lady Melania Trump and Senator Ted Cruz, 2025

In June 2022, Business Insider reported that Salazar appeared to have violated the Stop Trading on Congressional Knowledge (STOCK) Act, a federal transparency and conflict-of-interest law that she had criticized her predecessor Donna Shalala for violating, when she failed to properly disclose an exchange of non-publicly traded shares for publicly traded shares in healthcare company Cano Health worth up to $500,000.

in September 2023, Salazar introduced the Crucial Communism Teaching Act, which passed the House in December 2024.

=== Committee assignments ===
For the 118th Congress:

- Committee on Foreign Affairs
  - Subcommittee on Global Health, Global Human Rights, and International Organizations
  - Subcommittee on Western Hemisphere (Chair)
- Committee on Small Business
  - Subcommittee on Contracting and Infrastructure
  - Subcommittee on Innovation, Entrepreneurship, and Workforce Development

=== Select caucus memberships ===
- Climate Solutions Caucus
- Congressional America 250 Caucus, co-chair
- Congressional Caucus Against Foreign Corruption and Kleptocracy, co-chair
- Congressional Hispanic Conference
- Flood Resilience Caucus, co-founder
- Friends of the Dominican Republic Caucus, vice chair
- House Republican Israel Caucus
- Main Street Caucus
- Americans Abroad Caucus (co-chair)
- Republican Governance Group
- Tuberculosis Elimination Caucus, co-chair
- Congressional Blockchain Caucus
- Rare Disease Caucus

== Political positions ==
=== Abortion ===
Salazar opposes taxpayer funding for abortion. She has voted to restrict access to the abortion medication mifepristone and to eliminate resources for active-duty service members seeking reproductive care. She has received an A+ grade from Susan B. Anthony Pro-Life America.

=== Citizenship ===
Salazar joined Senator Marco Rubio in 2018 in suggesting that birthright citizenship should be "reviewed", citing claimed abuse of the standard by foreign visitors to South Florida. She has said she might be open to offering citizenship to some undocumented immigrants.

=== Donald Trump ===
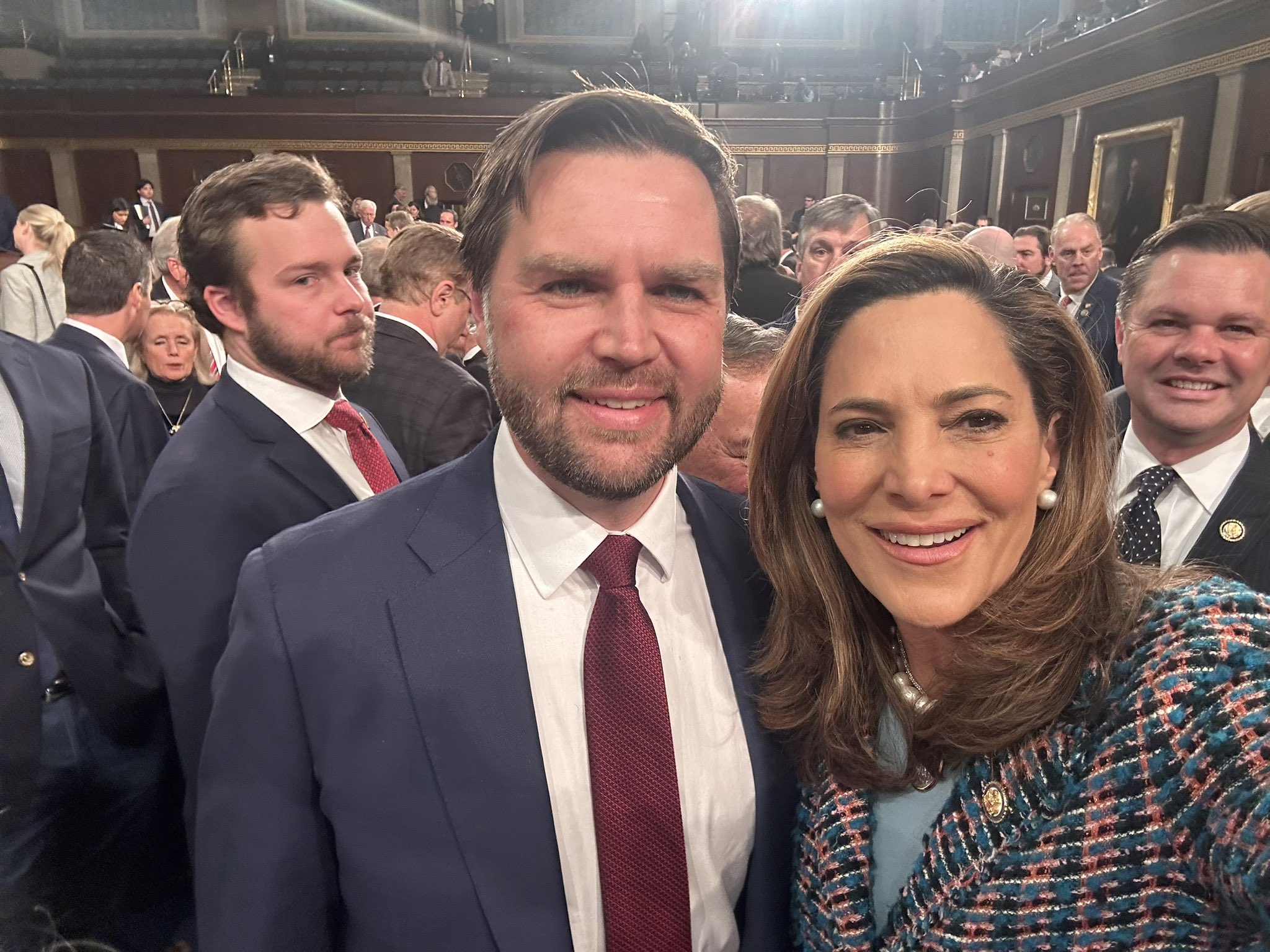
Salazar with Vice President JD Vance, 2025

Salazar said in 2018 that she wanted to do "whatever makes sense to the community"; of then-President Donald Trump, she said, "the president has used pretty insensitive words. I will talk to him in a nice, respectful way, because I do respect the institution of the presidency."

According to the Republican Accountability Project, Salazar voted against Trump's second impeachment but supported "[creating] an independent commission" to investigate the January 6 United States Capitol attack.

In September 2026, during that year's campaign season, Salazar released a commercial in which she stood in front of the White House and said "Mr. President, some of your immigration enforcement efforts have gone too far ... The same Hispanics who helped you get to the White House in 2024 feel betrayed today". The ad was seen as a sign that Republicans running in heavily Hispanic districts, even those that had solidly supported Trump in his presidential bids as the 27th congressional district had, considered it politically advantageous to distance themselves from his administration's immigration policies. Salazar said that the ad was intended merely as a warning to Trump, not an attack. Trump initially did not respond harshly, characterizing it as a disagreement. Supporters of Trump's immigration policy in the MAGA movement called for Salazar, a native-born U.S. citizen, to be deported or at least barred from the White House. Trump later escalated his criticism and reposted social media posts attacking Salazar and calling for her replacement.

=== Environment ===
Salazar publicly supported a carbon tax proposal by Republican then-representative Carlos Curbelo that many other Republicans rejected. One of her campaign commercials vowed to fight for environmental protection in Congress.

=== Epstein files ===
Salazar voted in favor of releasing the Epstein files on November 18, 2025. Following the vote, she posted on X that "the American people deserve full transparency. No one is above truth, not the rich, not the powerful, not the politically connected. Accountability must come first." Though she had once called the files a "Democratic Hoax", she ultimately voted to release the files following a directive from Trump.

=== Gun policy ===
In October 2018, Salazar said she might also back an assault weapons ban, though she ultimately voted against the Assault Weapons Ban of 2022. In March 2021, she was one of eight Republicans to join the House majority in passing the Bipartisan Background Checks Act of 2021. She has called herself a "firm believer in the Second Amendment" while also saying that "ways must be found to keep guns out of the reach of those who should never have them, namely children, criminals and the mentally ill". She has endorsed criminal background checks and called for "effectively closing loopholes that allow criminals to have access to firearms."

In June 2022, Salazar voted with congressional Democrats to raise the legal age to buy some types of assault rifles from 18 to 21.

=== Healthcare ===
Salazar said that she would only support repeal of the Affordable Care Act if a viable alternative were presented. She opposed repeal of its mandate that health insurers cover pre-existing conditions, but called for "free market" policies in health insurance.

=== Immigration ===
In 2025 and 2026, Salazar sponsored the DIGNIDAD Act, a comprehensive immigration and amnesty bill. The act would grant work authorization and a pathway to legal status for up to 12 million illegal immigrants living in the United States, reform the asylum screening process, and provide pathways to citizenship for Deferred Action for Childhood Arrivals recipients.

=== Foreign policy and views on socialism ===
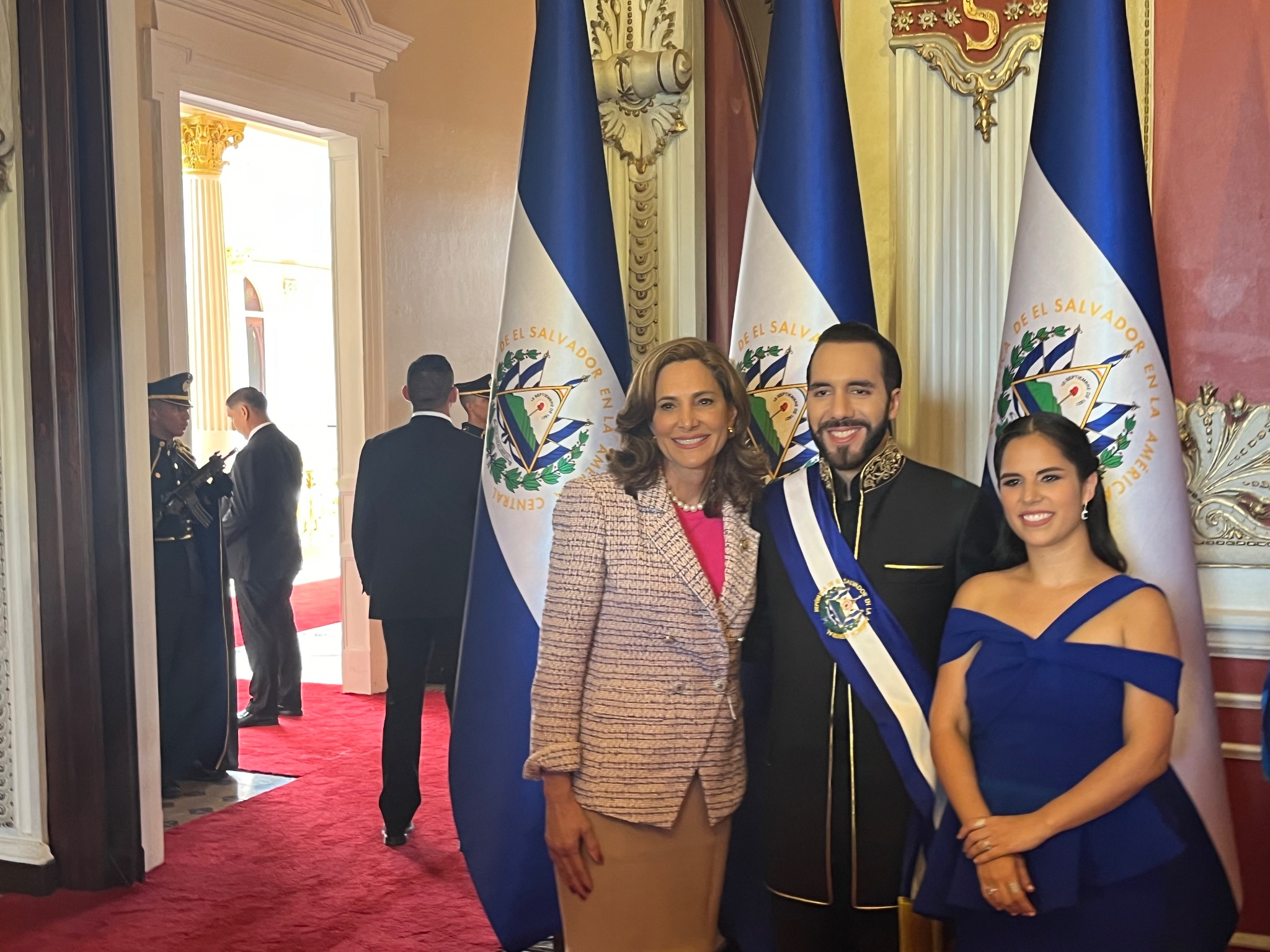
Salazar with Salvadoran President Nayib Bukele in El Salvador, 2024

Salazar is a supporter of Israel. She criticized President Barack Obama's "Cuban thaw" policy, saying that she would support lifting the United States trade embargo against Cuba only once there was democracy in Cuba.

On January 13, 2023, Salazar reintroduced the Fighting Oppression until the Reign of Castro Ends (FORCE) Act, which would "stop[] President Biden from normalizing relations with Cuba unless freedom and democracy are restored on the island". She has said that democratic socialism means "misery, oppression and exile".

Salazar is considered an ally of Argentine president Javier Milei and was the sole member of Congress to attend his inauguration, which was done at the invitation of the Argentine government. She argued that Argentina "is going to set the course and point of reference for the rest of Latin America as to the way that a country should be governed".

=== LGBTQ rights ===
On February 25, 2021, Salazar voted against the Equality Act, a bill that would prohibit discrimination based on gender identity and sexual orientation by amending the Civil Rights Act of 1964 and the Fair Housing Act of 1968. She said that the bill "missed the mark by removing religious freedom protections."

== Electoral history ==
=== 2018 ===
Florida's 27th congressional district election, 2018
Party	Candidate	Votes	%
Democratic	Donna Shalala	130,743	51.8
Republican	Maria Elvira Salazar	115,588	45.8
Independent	Mayra Joli	6,255	2.5
Total votes		252,586	100.0
Democratic gain from Republican			

=== 2020 ===
Florida's 27th congressional district election, 2020
Party	Candidate	Votes	%
Republican	Maria Elvira Salazar	176,141	51.4
Democratic	Donna Shalala (incumbent)	166,758	48.6
Total votes		342,899	100.0
Republican gain from Democratic			

=== 2022 ===
Florida's 27th congressional district election, 2022
Party	Candidate	Votes	%
Republican	Maria Elvira Salazar (incumbent)	136,038	57.3
Democratic	Annette Taddeo	101,404	42.7
Total votes		237,442	100.0
Republican hold			

=== 2024 ===
Florida's 27th congressional district election, 2024
Party	Candidate	Votes	%
Republican	Maria Elvira Salazar (incumbent)	199,159	60.38
Democratic	Lucia Baez-Geller	130,708	39.62
Total votes		329,867	100.00
Republican hold			

== Honors and awards ==
Salazar has won five Emmy Awards for reports on Nicaragua, Cuba, and the Dominican Republic. She was selected for the inaugural 2021 Forbes 50 Over 50, made up of entrepreneurs, leaders, scientists and creators over the age of 50.

== Personal life ==
Salazar lives in Miami with her two daughters by her first husband, Renzo Maietto. In 2022, she married businessman Lester Woerner. The marriage ended in divorce in October 2024.

== See also ==
- Hispanic and Latino conservatism in the United States
- List of Hispanic and Latino Americans in the United States Congress
- Religious affiliation in the United States House of Representatives
- Women in the United States House of Representatives

U.S. House of Representatives
Preceded by Donna Shalala	Member of the U.S. House of Representatives from Florida's 27th congressional district 2021–present	Incumbent
U.S. order of precedence (ceremonial)
Preceded by Deborah K. Ross	United States representatives by seniority 274th	Succeeded by Victoria Spartz
