= Ami Bera =

American physician & politician (born 1965)

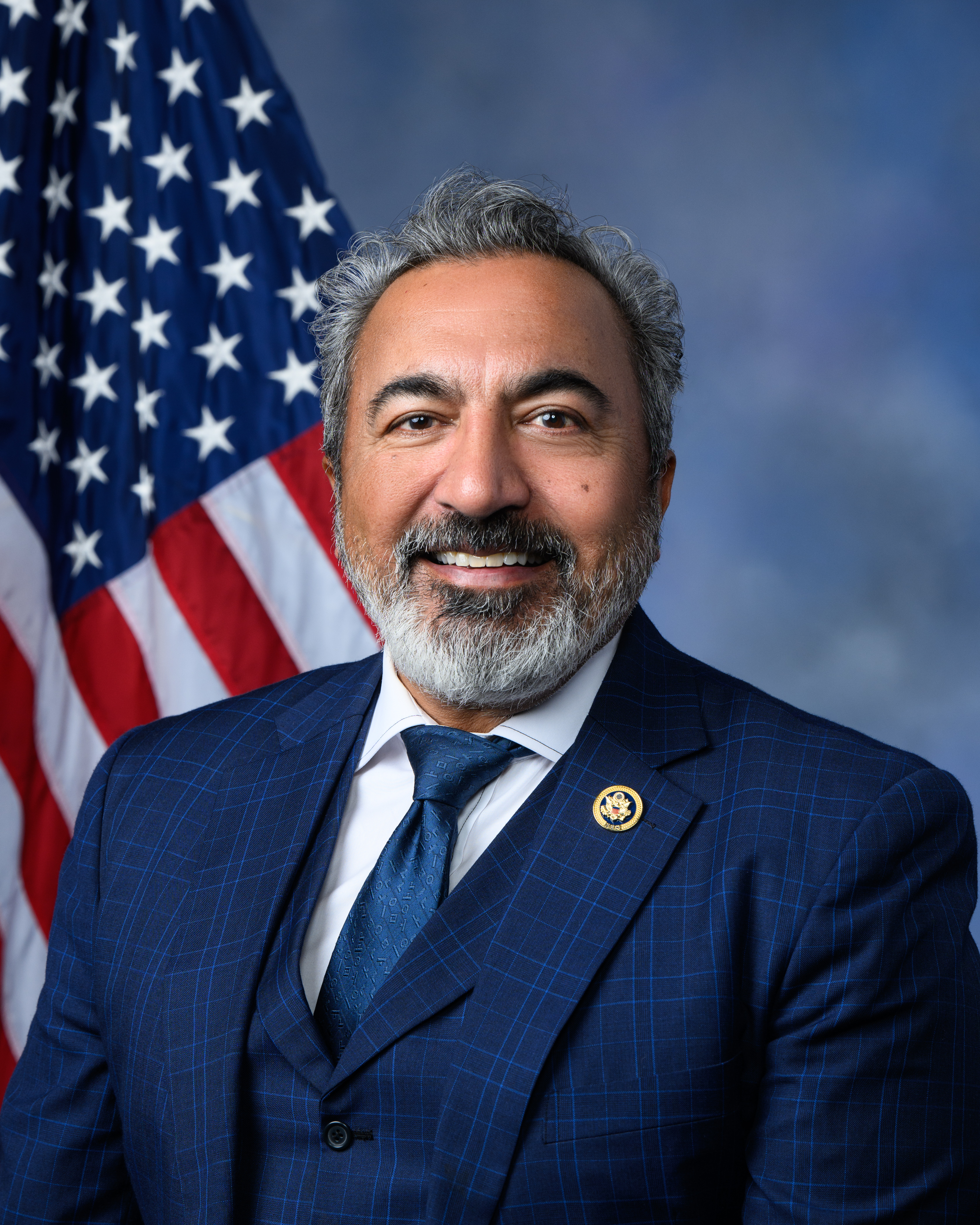
- Official portrait, 2024

Member of the U.S. House of Representatives from California
- Incumbent
- Assumed office January 3, 2013
- Preceded by: Dan Lungren
- Constituency: 7th district (2013–2023); 6th district (2023–present)

Personal details
- Born: Amerish Babulal Bera; March 2, 1965 (age 61) Los Angeles, California, U.S.
- Party: Democratic
- Spouse: Janine Bera (m. 1991)
- Children: 1
- Education: University of California, Irvine (BS, MD)
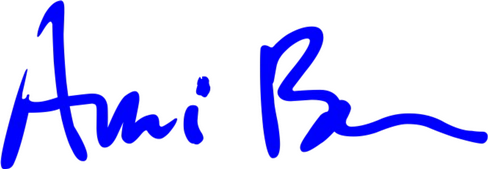
- Signature
- Website: House website Campaign website
- Bera's voice Bera on Russian aggression towards Ukraine. Recorded February 2, 2022

Amerish Babulal "Ami" Bera (/ˈɑːmi ˈbɛrə/ AH-mee BERR-ə; born March 2, 1965) is an American physician and politician who has been serving as a member of the United States House of Representatives from California since 2013. He is a member of the Democratic Party and represents California's 6th congressional district, which is in Sacramento County.

Prior to his time in Congress, Bera worked as a physician and served as the chief medical officer for Sacramento County. He has also been involved in various community organizations, including the American Red Cross and the California State Board of Education.

Bera is also a member of the House Foreign Affairs Committee and has been an advocate for diplomacy and global engagement.

== Early life, education, and career ==
Bera's father, Babulal Bera, immigrated to the United States from Rajkot, Gujarat, India in 1958. Two years later, Babulal Bera was joined by his wife, Kanta. Ami Bera was born in Los Angeles and raised in the Orange County city of La Palma. He attended John F. Kennedy High School while living there.

Bera has a bachelor's degree in biological sciences from the University of California, Irvine, also earning his Doctor of Medicine degree there in 1991. From 1997 to 1999 he was the medical director of Care Management at the Mercy Healthcare for Sacramento. He served as the chief medical officer for the County of Sacramento and later as the associate dean for admissions at the UC Davis School of Medicine. From 2005 to 2012, he served as a clinical professor at the school.

== U.S. House of Representatives ==
=== Elections ===
==== 2010 ====
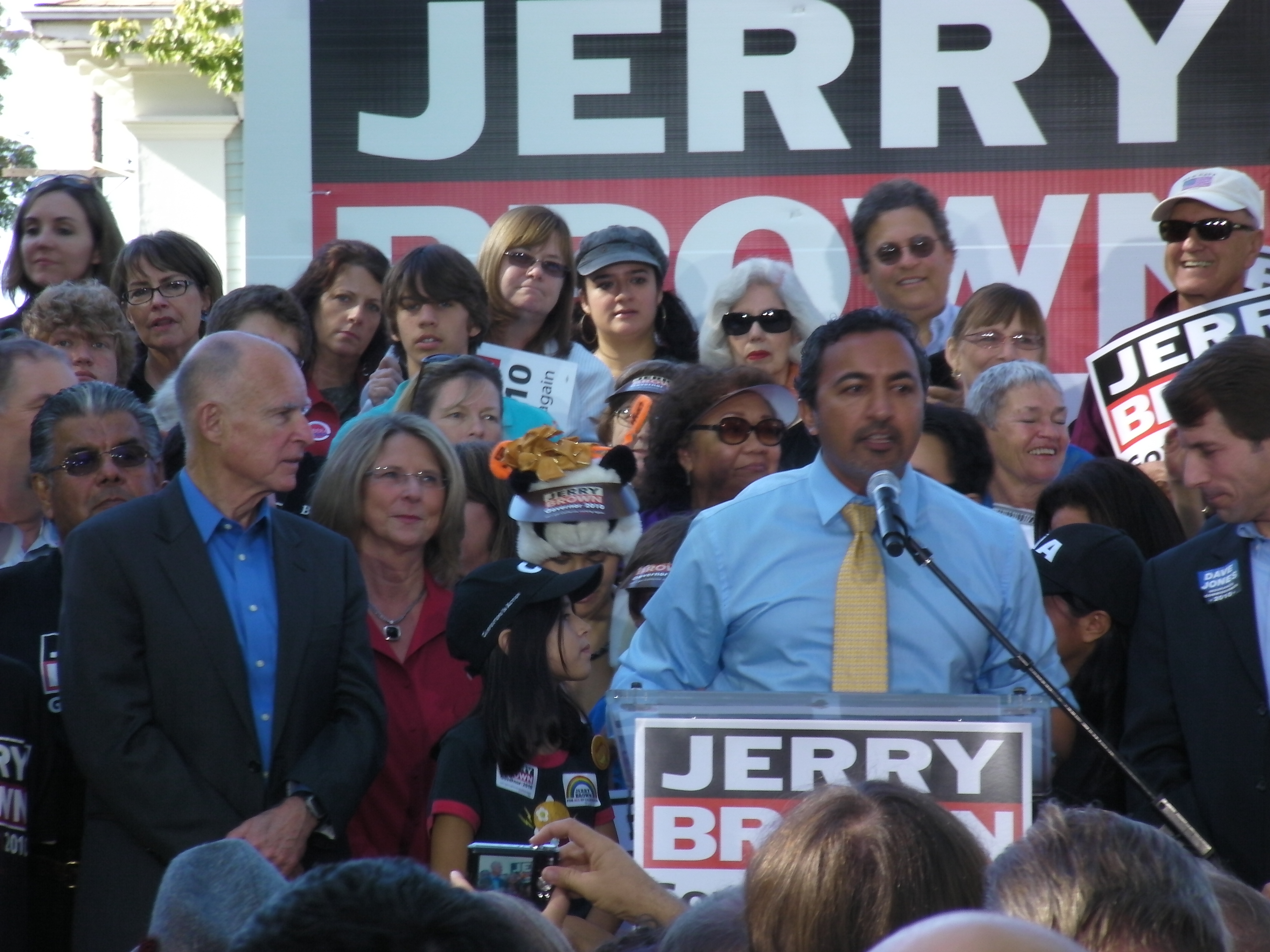
Bera at an October 2010 rally for Jerry Brown

Bera challenged three-term Republican incumbent Dan Lungren in the general election for California's 3rd congressional district. He ran unopposed for the Democratic nomination. He raised more money than Lungren for the five quarters through mid-2010, making him the only Democratic challenger with more cash than a sitting Republican member of the House. Bera was one of 17 candidates the Democratic Congressional Campaign Committee targeted to take over Republican-held or open seats in 2010.

Lungren was the only incumbent Republican whose race was rated a "tossup" by CQ Politics, but it was rerated "Lean GOP" in the campaign's final days, and the race was considered competitive by both parties. Polling by Daily Kos in September showed Lungren leading Bera, 46%–38%. Bera cited health care, education and economic recovery among his top legislative priorities. In November, Lungren won reelection, defeating Bera 51%–43%.

In 2010, after Bera accepted a $250 donation from Basim Elkarra, executive director of the Sacramento chapter of the Council on American-Islamic Relations (CAIR), the California Republican Party called on him to return the money. Bera returned the money after these concerns were raised.

==== 2012 ====
Bera announced a rematch against Lungren in 2012. The district had been renumbered the 7th district, and made somewhat more compact. It lost all of its territory outside of Sacramento County, making it slightly friendlier to Democrats.

On November 13, 2012, Bera attended freshman orientation as congressman-elect while votes were still being counted. Candidates in these tight races sometimes attend the orientation by the Committee on House Administration, whose chairman was Bera's opponent, Lungren.

On November 15, 2012, the Associated Press called the race for Bera, who won 51%–49%.

==== 2014 ====
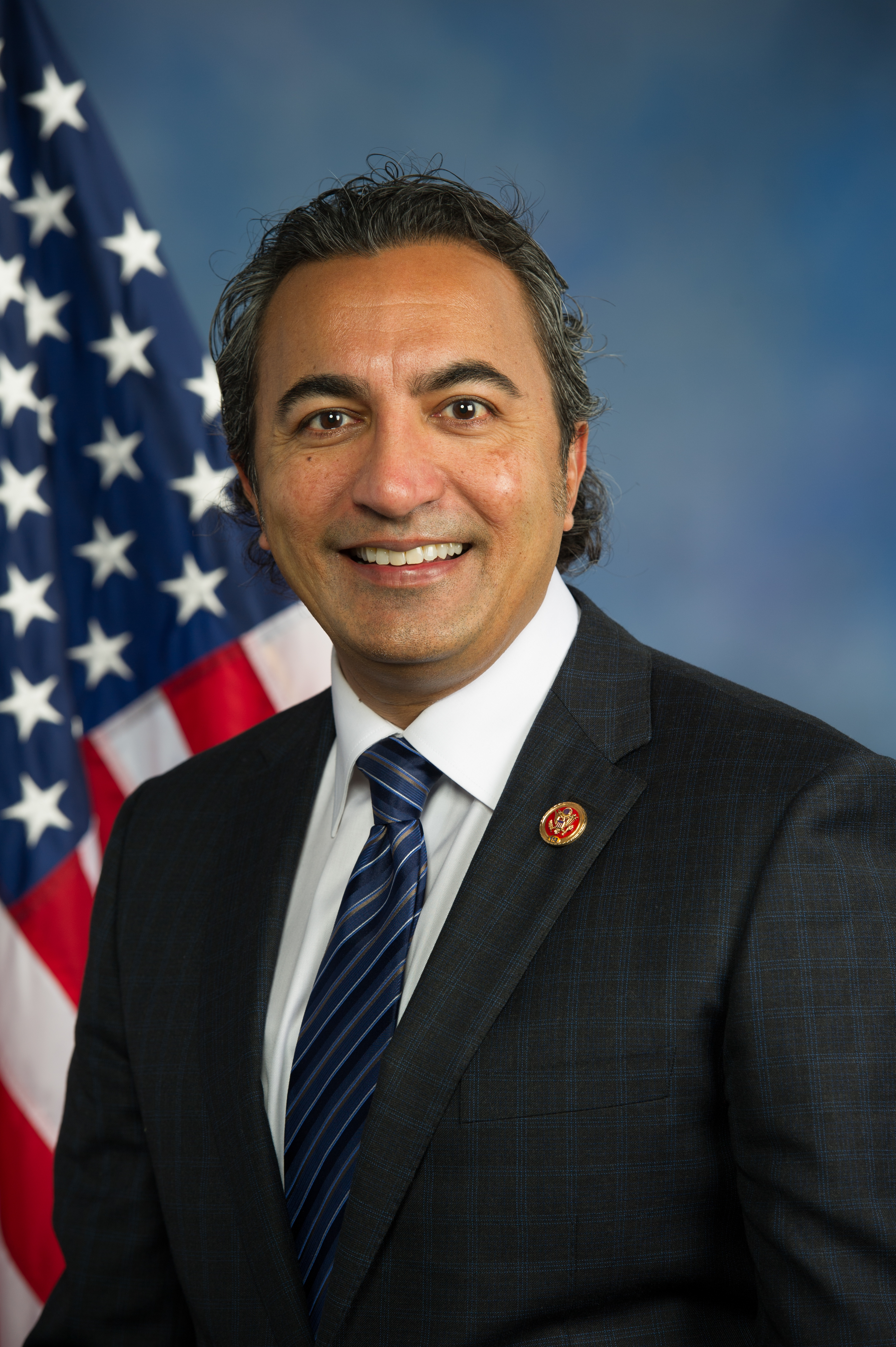
Bera during the 113th United States Congress

Bera ran for reelection in 2014, facing former Republican congressman Doug Ose, who had represented what was then the 3rd district from 1999 to 2005. The Rothenberg Political Report rated the 7th district "Lean Democratic," but The Sacramento Bee reported that Bera was "viewed by both parties as one of the most vulnerable Democrats in the country." Bera was a member of the Democratic Congressional Campaign Committee's Frontline program, designed to support vulnerable candidates. In June 2014, Politico reported that the DCCC planned to support Bera with $1.7 million in ads throughout fall 2014, and the House Majority PAC, a political action committee designed to support Democratic candidates, reserved $200,000 for late-election television ads.

The Hill reported that Bera's campaign received donations from parents of another Democratic candidate, Kevin Strouse, only to have Bera's parents then donate a similar amount to Strouse's campaign. According to The Philadelphia Inquirer, "The donations appear legal, campaign finance experts say, though two said any agreement among the parents to trade donations could be viewed as an attempted end run around contribution limits." In May 2016, Bera's father, Babulal, pleaded guilty to two felony counts of elections fraud.

No Labels co-founder and former George W. Bush advisor Mark McKinnon said of Bera, "He is the most important member of our Problem Solvers—of the entire group. He stepped up immediately as a freshman to take a leadership position. He was out early advocating on our big issues like No Budget, No Pay.”

In response to a poll by the American Sikh Committee to Evaluate Congressional Candidates, Bera did not answer two questions about the Indian government's part in the 1984 anti-Sikh riots in which 8,000 Sikhs were massacred after Indian prime minister Indira Gandhi's assassination. Instead, he noted that in 2005, Indian prime minister Manmohan Singh had publicly apologized to the Sikh community for the government's role. Bera also stated that, while it was a tragedy, he was more focused on the treatment of Sikhs in the U.S. and could not dictate how the Indian government should approach the matter. In response, some members of the Sikh-American community, and some PACs representing them, publicly withdrew their support for Bera. But with the majority of the Sikh-American population coming from outside of Bera's district, the advocates acknowledged that they were unlikely to affect the outcome of the race.

On election night, Bera "was down by more than 3,000 votes...but came back to win after all the absentee and mail-in ballots were in." In the end, he won 50.4% of the vote to Ose's 49.6%.

==== 2016 ====
Bera ran for reelection in 2016. He faced Republican Sacramento County Sheriff Scott Jones in the general election. In January 2016, the Elk Grove-South County Democratic Club, Bera's home club, voted against endorsing him, citing concerns with his record on trade and Syrian refugees.

Bera's 2016 race was "one of the nastiest Congressional races with allegations and insinuations being bandied back and forth" and was also "one of the last two House races in the entire nation yet to be called." As he began his third term, he was joined by three new Indian-American House members: Raja Krishnamoorthi from Illinois, Pramila Jayapal from Washington, and Ro Khanna from California. Silicon Valley entrepreneur M. R. Rangaswami said Bera "was the first Indian American to be in Congress in a long time and now can actually lead a Caucus...able to shepherd Pramila, Raja and Ro and get them going during their freshman year."

A coalition of dissatisfied groups prevented Bera from garnering his party's endorsement in January, but at the state Democratic convention in February, he was endorsed, with 90% of the delegates voting to endorse.

During the 2016 campaign Bera's father, Babulal Bera, was sentenced to one year and one day in federal prison, and fined $100,200, for federal campaign finance violations that helped fund two of his son's campaigns.

Bera narrowly defeated Jones in the general election, with 51% of the vote to Jones's 49%. The margin of victory was 4,802 votes.

Since 2016, which saw the election to the House of three other Indian-Americans and to the Senate of the first Indian-American Senator, Kamala Devi Harris, Bera has been described as the "Godfather" of Indian-Americans on Capitol Hill.

==== 2018 ====
In 2018, Bera was reelected, garnering 155,016 votes (55%) and defeating Republican Andrew Grant, a former U.S. Department of State official, who received 126,601 (45%).

==== 2020 ====
In 2020, Bera was reelected, garnering 217,416 votes (56%) and defeating Republican Buzz Patterson, a retired United States Air Force Lieutenant Colonel who received 166,549 (43%).

==== 2026 ====
Based on the 2025 California Prop 50, Bera filed to run for election in California's 3rd congressional district.

=== Tenure ===
During his first five terms in office (2013–2022), Bera was a cosponsor of 95 legislative items that became law and an original cosponsor of none. Acts designating a name for a federal property accounted for 44 of the 95, typically with 50 or more cosponsors. Another 37 were general consensus items cosponsored by at least one third of the 435-member House, of which 27 were cosponsored by at least two thirds. Bera cosponsored only one successful item with fewer than 30 cosponsors. He was the final of 7 cosponsors for H.R.3399 in the 116th Congress, which became law on October 30, 2020. The law authorized the Nutria Eradication and Control Act of 2003 to continue through 2025 and made California eligible for program grants. Nutria are an invasive species of large, semiaquatic rodents whose burrowing could threaten levees in the Sacramento-San Joaquin River Delta, where productive farmland lies below sea level.

During the 118th Congress, his sixth term in office (2023–2024), Bera was a cosponsor of 15 legislative items that became law and an original cosponsor of none. Acts designating a name for a federal property accounted for 11 of the 15, typically with 50 cosponsors, and three other acts were cosponsored by at least two thirds of the House. Bera was the 25th of 62 cosponsors of the bipartisan H.R.4581, which became law on 12 July 2024 and clarifies that activities to prevent stillbirths are a permissible use of Federal funds.

In an interview covered in the Elk Grove Citizen, Bera said his first year in Congress "was about being focused here in the district but also building my reputation in Washington, D.C."

In October 2013, Bera announced that he would give up his federal pay for the duration of the government shutdown. He also announced that in response to sequester cuts, he would donate 8.2% of his check each month to local organizations affected by sequester cuts.

In a 2015 op-ed supporting the Trans-Pacific Partnership in the Sacramento Bee, Bera copied several sentences from documents produced by the Business Roundtable and Third Way and from an Obama White House report. He received criticism, including from labor groups like the California Labor Federation, for parroting lobbying firms. Bera later wrote an apology, though he stood by the sentiment of the op-ed.

As of October 2021, Bera had voted in line with Joe Biden's stated position 100% of the time.

In 2022, Bera was bitten by a rabid fox on Capitol Hill and received the appropriate shots. Coinciding with World Rabies Day, Bera introduced legislation, the Affordable Rabies Treatment for Uninsured Act, which would create a government program that would reimburse health care providers who administer the treatment to people who are uninsured. A five-shot regimen of rabies immunoglobulin and rabies vaccine can cost over $5,000.

On March 6, 2025, Bera was one of ten Democrats in Congress who joined all of their Republican colleagues in voting to censure Democratic congressman Al Green for interrupting President Donald Trump's State of the Union Address.

==== Environment ====
According to The Hill in 2014, "Bera, who faces a tough race this fall against Republican Doug Ose, is a strong advocate for tackling climate change, but global warming isn't his focus when he talks about the drought with constituents."

==== Health care ====
Bera supports the Affordable Care Act (Obamacare) and has voted against repeal efforts.

==== Syrian refugees ====
On November 19, 2015, Bera voted for HR 4038, legislation that would effectively halt the resettlement of refugees from Syria and Iraq to the United States.

==== Pakistan and terrorism ====
In 2016, Bera called on Pakistan "to take responsibility and start cracking down" on terrorists based in its country, and praised the BJP for its restraint in the face of the attack on an Indian Air Force base by Pakistani terrorists.

==== India–U.S. relations ====
Bera called a June 2016 speech by Indian prime minister Narendra Modi to a joint session of the U.S. Congress "the perfect speech for this moment in time" and claimed that India was becoming "a global leader and a global partner with the United States." "As an Indian American and a Gujarati American," Bera said, "I was thrilled by the prime minister's speech." Narendra Modi is also Gujarati.

==== Israel ====
Bera voted to provide Israel with support following 2023 Hamas attack on Israel. Bera boycotted Prime Minister Netanyahu's address to a joint session of Congress on July 25, 2024, saying that Netanyahu is "the one person standing in the way" of a cease-fire and hostage release.

==== Taxes ====
In 2017, Bera voted against the Tax Cuts and Jobs Act of 2017.

==== Big Tech ====
In 2022, Bera was one of 16 Democrats to vote against the Merger Filing Fee Modernization Act of 2022, an antitrust package that would crack down on corporations for anti-competitive behavior.

=== Committee assignments ===
For the 119th Congress:

- Committee on Foreign Affairs
  - Subcommittee on East Asia and Pacific
  - Subcommittee on South and Central Asia
- Permanent Select Committee on Intelligence
  - Subcommittee on National Intelligence Enterprise
  - Subcommittee on National Security Agency and Cyber

=== Caucus memberships ===
- American Sikh Congressional Caucus
- Black Maternal Health Caucus
- New Democrat Coalition (vice chair of outreach)
- Congressional Asian Pacific American Caucus (whip)
- Climate Solutions Caucus
- Rare Disease Caucus
- Congressional Equality Caucus
- U.S.-Japan Caucus
- Congressional Coalition on Adoption
- Congressional Ukraine Caucus
- Congressional Freethought Caucus

== Political positions ==
=== Abortion ===
He is pro choice. He opposed the 2022 overturning of Roe v. Wade, calling it a "blow to women's rights and reproductive health care".

== Personal life ==
Bera and his wife, Janine Bera, have one child. They reside in Elk Grove, California, which is outside of his district.

On April 4, 2022, Bera was one of nine people attacked by a rabid fox outside the US Capitol. He said afterward, '"I expect to get attacked if I go on Fox News; I don't expect to get attacked by a fox."

Bera is one of three Unitarian Universalists in Congress.

== Electoral history ==
Electoral history of Ami Bera
Year	Office		Party	Primary			General			Result	Swing	Ref.
Year	Office		Party	Total	%	P.	Total	%	P.	Result	Swing	Ref.
2010	U.S. House	3rd	Democratic	49,022	100.0%	1st	113,128	43.19%	2nd	Lost	Hold	
2012	U.S. House	7th	Democratic	49,433	41.0%	2nd	141,241	51.68%	1st	Won	Gain	
2014	U.S. House	7th	Democratic	51,878	46.72%	1st	92,521	50.40%	1st	Won	Hold	
2016	U.S. House	7th	Democratic	93,506	54.00%	1st	152,133	51.17%	1st	Won	Hold	
2018	U.S. House	7th	Democratic	84,776	51.65%	1st	155,016	55.04%	1st	Won	Hold	
2020	U.S. House	7th	Democratic	106,124	50.32%	1st	217,416	56.62%	1st	Won	Hold	
2022	U.S. House	6th	Democratic	76,317	52.61%	1st	121,058	55.95%	1st	Won	Hold	
2024	U.S. House	6th	Democratic	76,605	51.85%	1st	165,408	57.62%	1st	Won	Hold	
2026	U.S. House	3rd	Democratic	76,653	34.26%	1st	TBD					
Source: Secretary of State of California | Statewide Election Results

== See also ==
- Physicians in the United States Congress
- List of Asian Americans and Pacific Islands Americans in the United States Congress

U.S. House of Representatives
Preceded by George Miller	Member of the U.S. House of Representatives from California's 7th congressional district 2013–2023	Succeeded by Doris Matsui
Preceded by Doris Matsui	Member of the U.S. House of Representatives from California's 6th congressional district 2023–present	Incumbent
U.S. order of precedence (ceremonial)
Preceded by Joyce Beatty	United States representatives by seniority 100th	Succeeded by Julia Brownley
