= M. R. Rangaswami =

Indian software executive, investor and entrepreneur

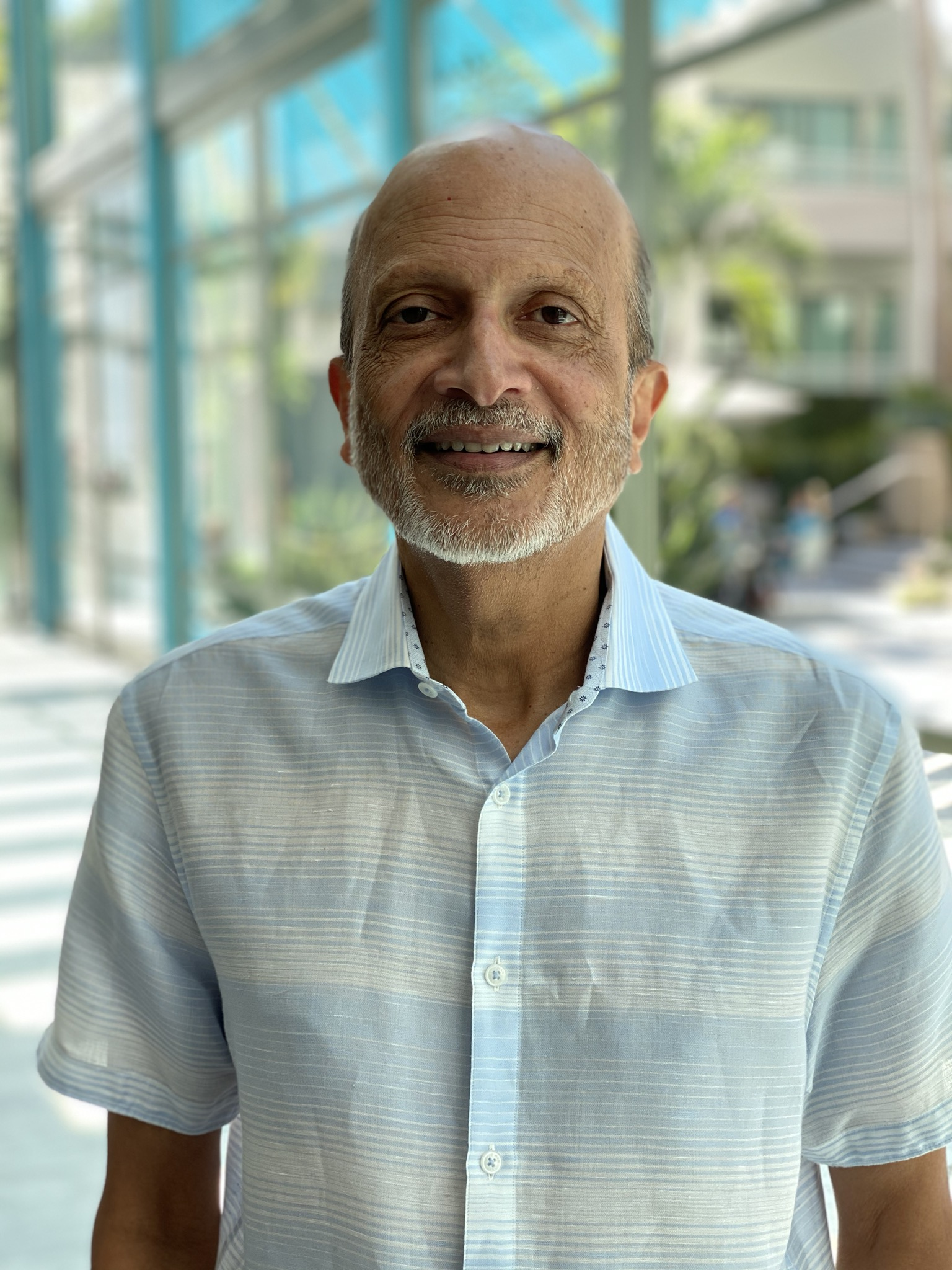
- Education: Loyola College, Chennai; Madras University; Kent State University
- Occupations: Businessperson, angel investor

M.R. (Madhavan) Rangaswami (born 1955) is an Indian-American investor, entrepreneur, corporate eco-strategy expert, and philanthropist. Recognized as a software business expert, he participated in the rapid expansion of the Silicon Valley software industry during his tenure as an executive at both large and small software companies. In 1997, he co-founded Sand Hill Group, one of the earliest “angel” investment firms: in 2007, he founded Corporate Eco Forum.

== Sand Hill Group ==
In 1997, Rangaswami partnered with Constantin Delvanis to form Sand Hill Group, a software consulting and investment group. The firm was one of the early “angel investors” in Silicon Valley. Companies in which Sand Hill Group has invested include NeoForma, Niku, Crossworlds, Luminate, Cord Blood Registry, and most recently, Adchemy, BDNA, Vysr, and Supercool School. Sand Hill Group has also become known for its community-building activities in the software industry. The firm produced the Enterprise and Software (now owned by CMP Technology) conference series and publishes sandhill.com, an online resource for software business strategy. Rangaswami was profiled on the front page of the Wall Street Journal.

== Corporate Eco Forum ==
In 2007, M.R. embarked on a new venture as the founder of the Corporate Eco Forum, an invitation-only membership organization for Global 500 companies that demonstrate a serious commitment to the environment as a business strategy issue. CEF’s mission is to help accelerate sustainable business innovation by creating the best neutral space for business leaders to strategize and exchange best-practice insights. Members represent 18 industries and have combined revenues exceeding $3 trillion.

In addition to the annual meeting, the CEF authors a series of research reports on corporate sustainability and publishes The EcoInnovator Blog as well as a weekly newsletter that summarizes the latest eco-business news.

== Indiaspora ==
Under the auspices of the SHG Foundation, Rangaswami founded Indiaspora to unite Indian Americans and to transform their success into meaningful impact in India and on the global stage. In September 2012, Indiaspora's inaugural Forum hosted 100 leaders from all constituencies of the Indian American community, including CEOs, activists, academics, journalists, financiers, and diplomats. The weekend event energized the community and was a catalyst to transform the success of Indian Americans into a meaningful impact in India and on the global stage.

In January 2013, the Indiaspora hosted the first-ever Indian American Ball for the President of the United States. Indiaspora members and a sold-out crowd of 1,200 Indian Americans joined politicians, policymakers, and other guests and celebrated the accomplishments of the 3-million-strong community.

== Accomplishments ==
- Advisor of Inxeption
- Board member of the Kaliash Satyarthi Children's Foundation
- Recipient of the US-China Educational Trust (US-CET) inaugural “Asians in America" award in 2016
- Recipient of the Association to Advance Collegiate Schools of Business (AACSB) "Influential Leaders" award in 2015
- Honored With US-CET Lifetime Achievement Award
- Included in Top 25 Most Influential Technology Executives 1997
- Listed on the Forbes Midas 100 list of most successful investors in 2001 and 2003
- Profiled in 2 books: Those Immigrants by Scott Haas and The $8 Man by Brenda Christensen
