= Susan Wild =

American politician and attorney (born 1957)

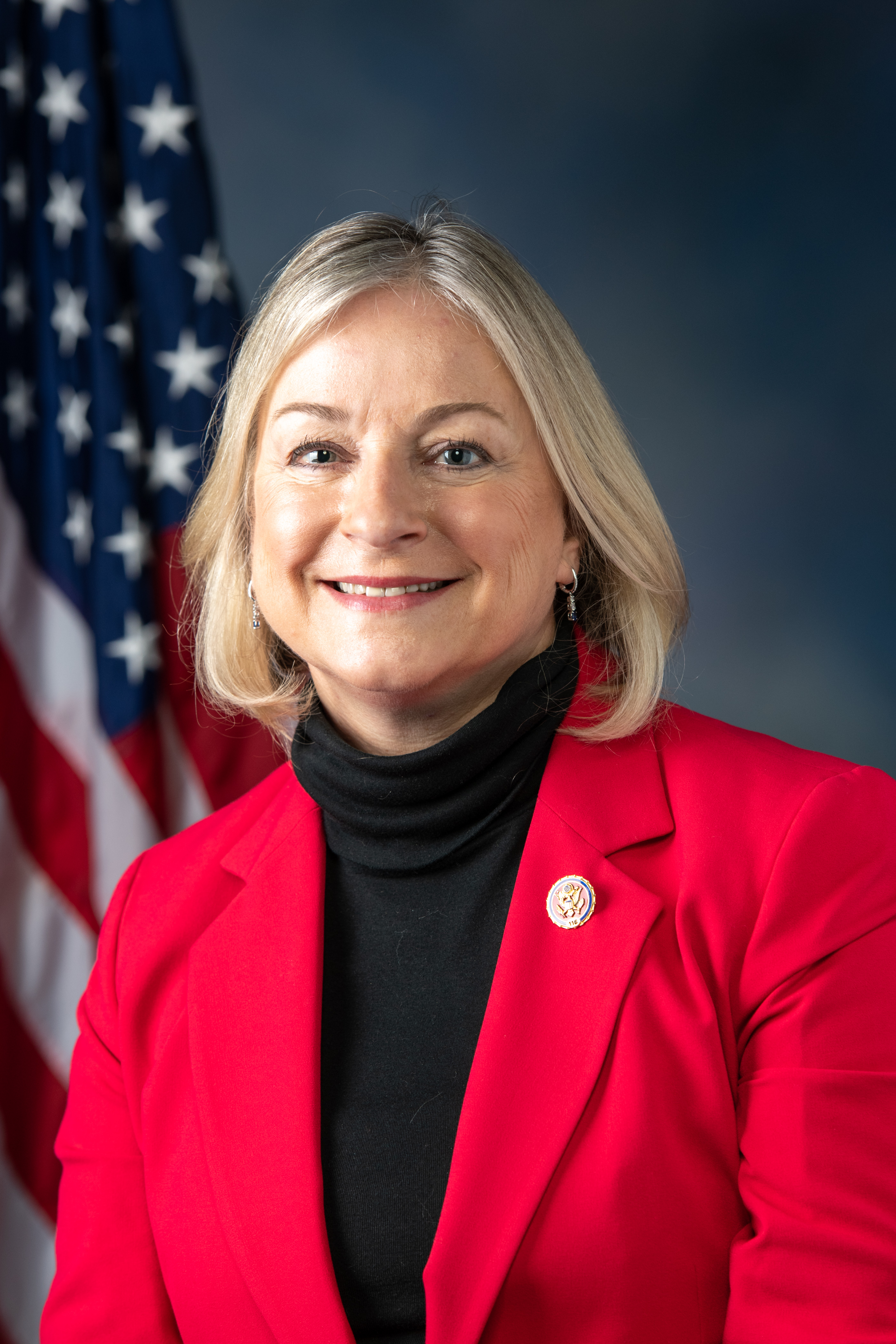
- Official portrait, 2019

Ranking Member of the House Ethics Committee
- In office January 3, 2023 – January 3, 2025
- Preceded by: Michael Guest (acting)
- Succeeded by: Mark DeSaulnier

Chair of the House Ethics Committee
- In office September 30, 2022 – January 3, 2023
- Preceded by: Ted Deutch
- Succeeded by: Michael Guest

Member of the U.S. House of Representatives from Pennsylvania
- In office November 6, 2018 – January 3, 2025 (Note: Wild's official service begins on the date of the special election, while she was not sworn in until November 13, 2018.)
- Preceded by: Charlie Dent
- Succeeded by: Ryan Mackenzie
- Constituency: 15th district (2018–2019); 7th district (2019–2025)

Personal details
- Born: Susan Ellis; June 7, 1957 (age 69) Wiesbaden Air Force Base, West Germany (now Germany)
- Party: Democratic
- Spouse: Russell Wild (m. 1981; div. 2002)
- Domestic partner: Kerry Acker (2003–2019)
- Children: 2
- Education: American University (BA); George Washington University (JD)
- Website: Official website
- Wild's voice Wild on a bill about mental health during the COVID-19 pandemic. Recorded July 19, 2022.

Susan Wild (née Ellis; born June 7, 1957) is an American politician and lawyer who served as the U.S representative for Pennsylvania's 7th congressional district from 2018 to 2025. She is a member of the Democratic Party. The district encompasses the Lehigh Valley region of eastern Pennsylvania, and includes Allentown, Bethlehem, Easton, and Bangor. Wild was narrowly defeated by Republican Ryan Mackenzie in 2024.

Wild spent the last two months of 2018 as the member for Pennsylvania's 15th congressional district after Charlie Dent, former U.S. representative for the district, resigned in 2018. She co-chaired the New Democrat Coalition Climate Change Task Force and was vice chair of both the Congressional Labor and Working Families Caucus and the Subcommittee on Africa, Global Health, Global Human Rights and International Organizations. She was the first woman to represent the Lehigh Valley in Congress.

== Early life and education ==
Wild was born to a Jewish family on June 7, 1957, in West Germany, the daughter of Norman Leith, a member of the U.S. Air Force, and Susan Stimus Ellis, a journalist. Wild was born on Wiesbaden Air Force Base in Hesse, West Germany, where her father was then stationed. She also lived in France, California, New Mexico, and Washington, D.C.

== Career ==
In 1976, Wild volunteered to work for Jimmy Carter's presidential campaign. She attended American University, where she graduated in 1978. She earned her Juris Doctor from George Washington University Law School in 1982, where she studied under John Banzhaf.

In 1999, Wild became a partner at the law firm Gross McGinley.

In 2013, Wild ran unsuccessfully for county commissioner in Lehigh County, Pennsylvania. In 2015, she was appointed solicitor of Allentown, Pennsylvania, the first woman to hold the position.

=== U.S. House of Representatives ===
==== 2018 election ====
On December 31, 2017, Wild resigned as City Solicitor to campaign to succeed retiring U.S. representative Charlie Dent, a Republican, in the U.S. House of Representatives in November 2018 in Pennsylvania's 15th congressional district, which had been represented by a Republican for seven terms. She won the six-candidate Democratic Party primary with 33% of the vote, narrowly defeating Northampton County district attorney John Morganelli. In the 2018 general election, she defeated Republican Lehigh County county commissioner Marty Nothstein, winning 54.5% of the vote to Nothstein's 43.5%.

==== 2018 special election ====
On the same day, Wild also ran in a separate special election for the balance of the term of Dent, who resigned in May 2018 after announcing he would not run for reelection, winning the 15th congressional district's special election with 130,353 votes to Nothstein's 129,593.

There was a closer margin in the special election largely because the former 15th district, which was thrown out by the Pennsylvania Supreme Court in February 2018, stretched from the Lehigh Valley into heavier Republican regions of the state between Lebanon and Harrisburg, by way of a tendril in Berks County. The new 7th district is a more compact district centered in the Lehigh Valley, and including a sliver of the Poconos.

==== 2020 election ====
Wild ran for reelection to a second term. She was unopposed in the Democratic primary and faced former Lehigh County commissioner Lisa Scheller in the general election. Wild defeated Scheller with 51.9% of the vote, less than was expected.

==== 2022 election ====
Following the 2020 census, Wild was redistricted into a more competitive congressional seat. She was criticized by some district residents when she said of her new district, "Carbon County has many attributes, but it is a county that—although it was once an Obama county—it since has become a Trump county. I'm not quite sure what was in their heads because the people of Carbon County are exactly the kind of people who should not be voting for a Donald Trump, but I guess I might have to school them on that a little bit. But most of all, it is a very rural county."

In a rematch of the 2020 election, Wild narrowly defeated Scheller by 51% to 49%.

==== 2024 election ====
Wild ran for reelection in 2024, and was defeated by Republican Ryan Mackenzie, a Pennsylvania State Representative.

Following her defeat in the 2024 election, Wild was traced as the source of House Committee on Ethics media leaks related to the committee's investigation of former U.S. representative Matt Gaetz (R-FL). "Any leaks from members and staff are a violation of the committee’s rules: Individuals on the panel take an oath swearing they will not disclose unauthorized information," The Hill reported in covering the leaks.

=== Tenure ===
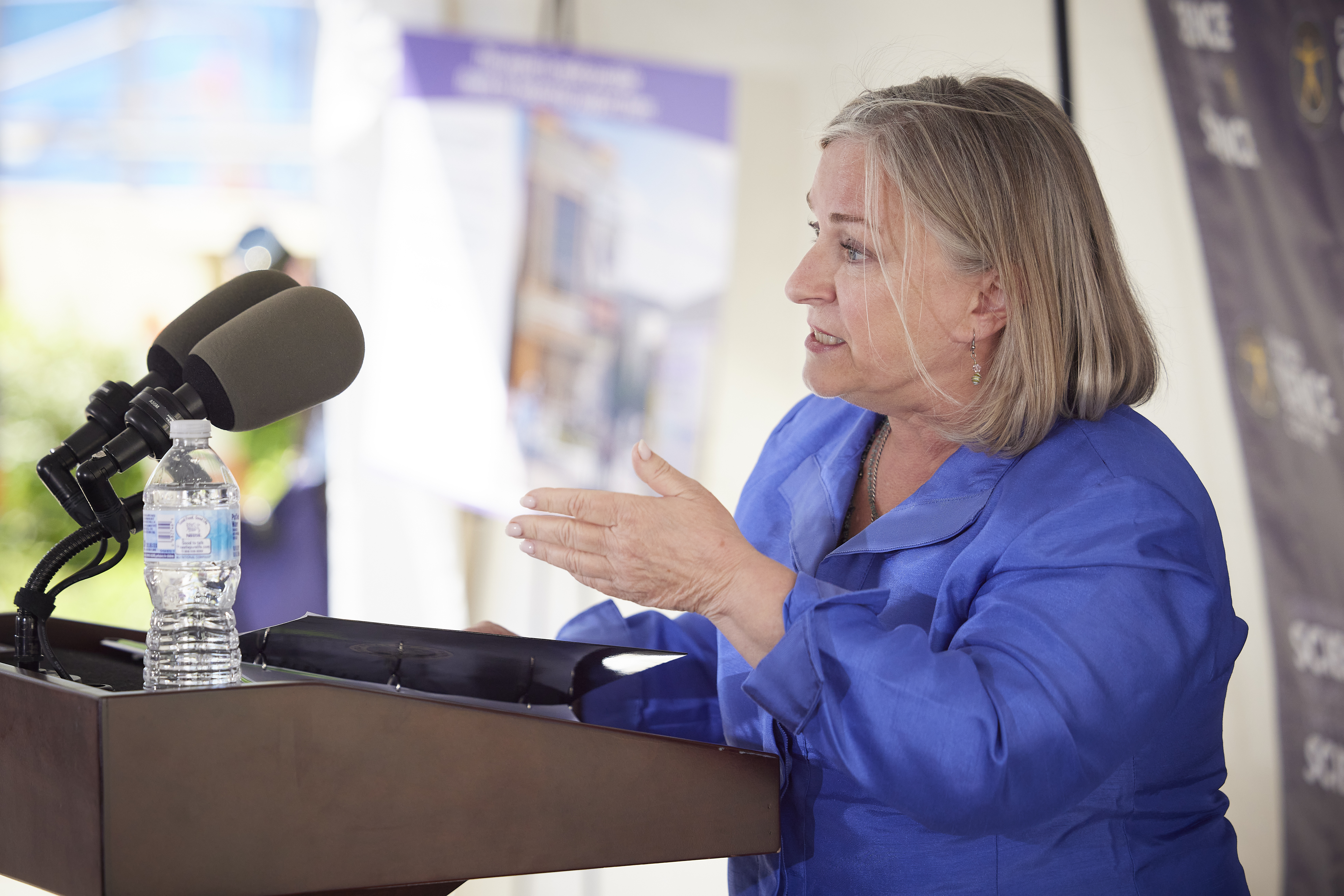
Wild speaking with media in Allentown

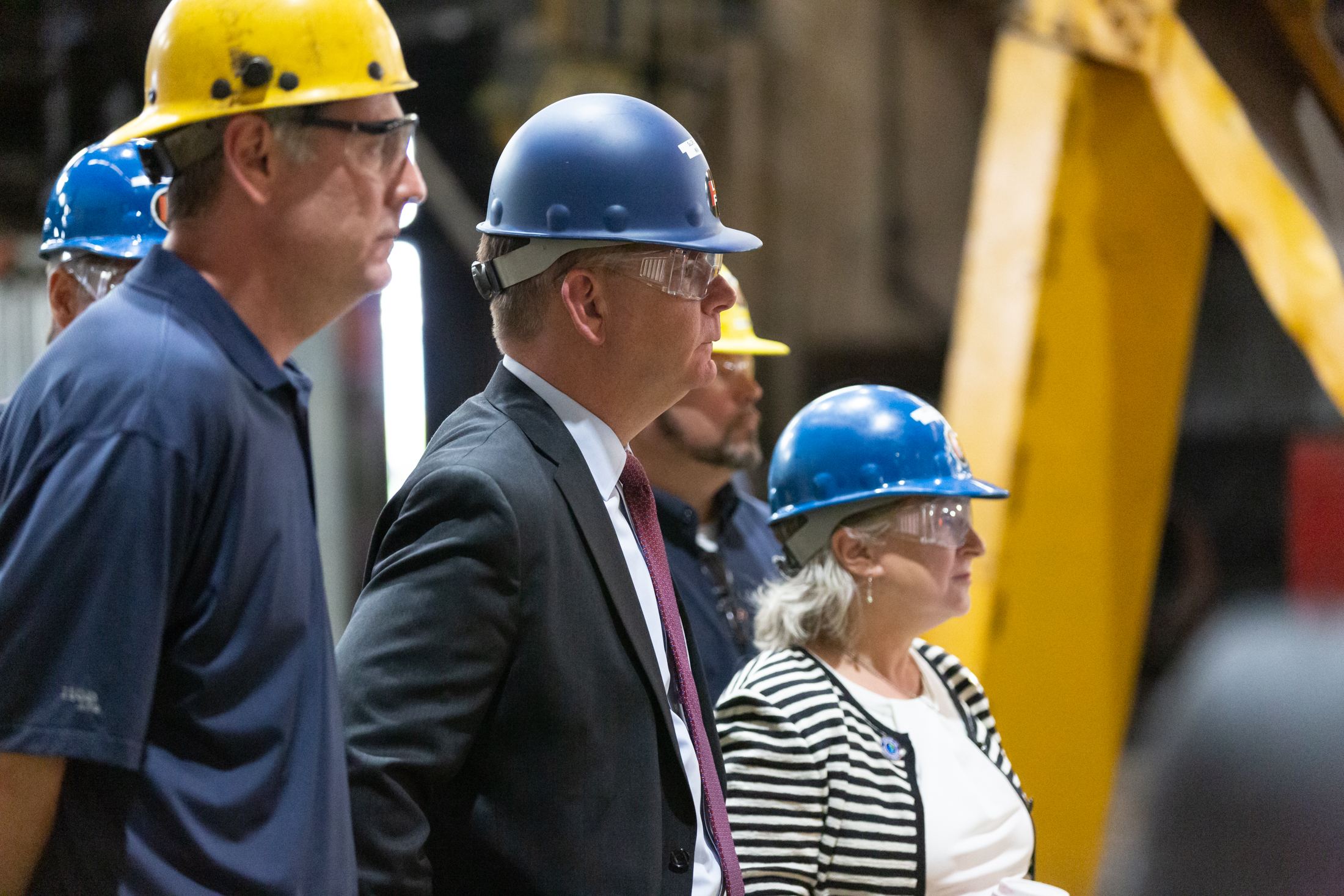
Wild (right) visiting Lehigh Heavy Forge with then U.S. Secretary of Labor Marty Walsh

In March 2021, Wild co-sponsored a resolution to expel U.S. representative Marjorie Taylor Greene from Congress, saying that Greene "advocated violence against our peers, the Speaker and our government".

As of November 2022, Wild had voted in line with President Joe Biden's stated position 100% of the time. In the 117th Congress, Wild voted with House speaker Nancy Pelosi 100% of the time.

==== Elder policy ====
In March 2020, Wild co-sponsored a bill to reauthorize the Older Americans Act for five years with a 35% increase in funding, which then President Donald Trump signed into law in March.

==== Firearms ====
In July 2022, Wild voted for H.R. 1808: Assault Weapons Ban of 2022, a bill that would have banned various guns, including AR-15s.

==== Foreign affairs ====
Wild was critical of Brazil's president Jair Bolsonaro, whom she characterized as "far-right", "misogynistic", "homophobic" and "anti-immigrant". In March 2019, she and 29 other Democratic lawmakers wrote a letter to U.S. secretary of state Mike Pompeo, which read in part, "Since the election of far-right candidate Jair Bolsonaro as president, we have been particularly alarmed by the threat Bolsonaro's agenda poses to the LGBTQ+ community and other minority communities, women, labor activists, and political dissidents in Brazil. We are deeply concerned that, by targeting hard-won political and social rights, Bolsonaro is endangering Brazil's long-term democratic future."

In March 2019, Wild described herself as a 'very pro-Israel member of Congress,' stating that the U.S. must 'constantly fortify' and 'sustain' its relationship with Israel, which she characterized as a 'terrific partner' in security and economic matters.

In 2023, Wild voted against H.Con.Res. 21, which directed President Biden to remove U.S. troops from Syria within 180 days.

In February 2023, Wild signed a letter urging President Biden to give F-16 fighter jets to Ukraine.

==== Healthcare ====
On January 31, 2023, Wild voted against H.R.497, the Freedom for Health Care Workers Act, a bill that would lift COVID-19 vaccine mandates for healthcare workers. The following day, on February 1, 2023, Wild voted against a resolution to end the COVID-19 national emergency.

==== Immigration ====
In 2019, Wild voted against allowing victims of crimes by illegal immigrants in sanctuary cities to report the incident to the Department of Homeland Security. On February 9, 2023, Wild also voted against H.J. Res. 24: Disapproving the action of the District of Columbia Council in approving the Local Resident Voting Rights Amendment Act of 2022 which condemns the District of Columbia's plan that would allow noncitizen voting in local elections.

==== Impeachment of Donald Trump ====
Wild voted for both articles of impeachment against President Donald Trump.

=== Committee assignments ===
- Committee on Ethics (Ranking member)
- Committee on Foreign Affairs
  - Subcommittee on Africa, Global Health, Global Human Rights and International Organizations (Vice Chair)
  - Subcommittee on Europe, Eurasia, Energy, and the Environment
- Committee on Education and Labor
  - Subcommittee on Health, Employment, Labor, and Pensions
- Committee on Science, Space and Technology
  - Subcommittee on Research and Technology

=== Caucus memberships ===
- Climate Solutions Caucus
- New Democrat Coalition
- Congressional LGBT+ Equality Caucus
- Congressional Ukrainian Caucus
- Black Maternal Health Caucus
- New Democrat Coalition Climate Change Task Force (Co-Chair)
- Congressional Labor and Working Families Caucus (Vice Chair)
- House Pro-Choice Caucus
- Rare Disease Caucus
- Congressional Freethought Caucus

== Electoral history ==
Democratic primary results (2018)
Party	Candidate	Votes	%
Democratic	Susan Wild	15,001	33.3
Democratic	John Morganelli	13,565	30.1
Democratic	Greg Edwards	11,510	25.6
Democratic	Roger Ruggles	2,443	5.4
Democratic	Rick Daugherty	1,718	3.8
Democratic	David Clark	766	1.7
Total votes		45,003	100.0

Pennsylvania's 7th congressional district, 2018
Party	Candidate	Votes	%
Democratic	Susan Wild	140,813	53.5
Republican	Marty Nothstein	114,437	43.5
Libertarian	Tim Silfies	8,011	3.0
Total votes		263,261	100.0
Democratic gain from Republican			

Pennsylvania's 15th congressional district, 2018 (special)
Party	Candidate	Votes	%	±%
Democratic	Susan Wild	130,353	48.54%	+10.52%
Republican	Marty Nothstein	129,594	48.26%	−10.13%
Libertarian	Tim Silfies	8,579	3.19%	−0.40%
Total votes		268,526	100.0%	N/A
Democratic gain from Republican				

Democratic primary results (2020)
Party	Candidate	Votes	%
Democratic	Susan Wild	76,878	100
Total votes		76,878	100.0

Pennsylvania's 7th congressional district, 2020
Party	Candidate	Votes	%
Democratic	Susan Wild	195,713	51.9
Republican	Lisa Scheller	181,569	48.1
Total votes		377,282	100.0

Pennsylvania's 7th congressional district, 2022
Party	Candidate	Votes	%
Democratic	Susan Wild	151,364	51.0
Republican	Lisa Scheller	145,527	49.0
Total votes		296,891	100.0

Pennsylvania's 7th congressional district, 2024
Party	Candidate	Votes	%
Republican	Ryan Mackenzie	203,688	50.5%
Democratic	Susan Wild	199,626	49.5%
Total votes		403,314	100.0
Republican gain from Democratic			

== Personal life ==
Wild married Russell Wild in 1981. They divorced in 2003 after 22 years of marriage. They have two adult children. Following her divorce, Wild reunited with Kerry Acker, who remained her life partner until his death by suicide on May 25, 2019. She lives in South Whitehall Township, located west of Allentown.

== See also ==
- List of Jewish members of the United States Congress
- Women in the United States House of Representatives

U.S. House of Representatives
Preceded by Charlie Dent	Member of the U.S. House of Representatives from Pennsylvania's 15th congressional district 2018–2019	Succeeded by Glenn Thompson
Preceded by Mary Gay Scanlon	Member of the U.S. House of Representatives from Pennsylvania's 7th congressional district 2019–2025	Succeeded by Ryan Mackenzie
Preceded by Ted Deutch	Chair of the House Ethics Committee; 2022–2023	Succeeded by Michael Guest
Preceded by Michael Guest; Acting	Ranking Member of the House Ethics Committee; 2023–2025	Succeeded by Mark DeSaulnier
U.S. order of precedence (ceremonial)
Preceded by Keith Rothfus as Former U.S. Representative	Order of precedence of the United States as Former U.S. Representative	Succeeded by Andrew Maguire as Former U.S. Representative
