= 2022 Florida's 20th congressional district special election =

- January 11, 2022

Florida's 20th congressional district
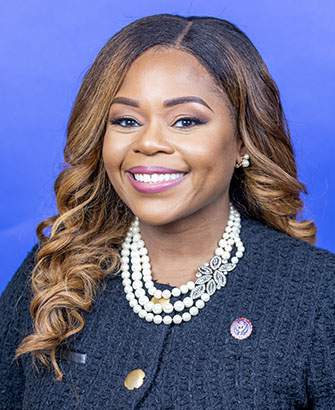

Nominee	Sheila Cherfilus-McCormick	Jason Mariner
Party	Democratic	Republican
Popular vote	44,707	10,966
Percentage	78.96%	19.37%
- County results Cherfilus-McCormick: 70–80% 80–90%
U.S. Representative
before election
Alcee Hastings
Democratic
Elected U.S. Representative
Sheila Cherfilus-McCormick
Democratic

The 2022 Florida's 20th congressional district special election was a special election to the United States House of Representatives. The seat had been vacant since incumbent Democratic representative Alcee Hastings died on April 6, 2021, of pancreatic cancer.

The special election was scheduled by Governor Ron DeSantis to be held on January 11, 2022. The primary elections were held on November 2, 2021. This left the seat vacant for nine months, substantially longer than the delay for previous special elections.

Following a recount, Sheila Cherfilus-McCormick was declared the winner of the Democratic primary by five votes over Broward County Commissioner Dale Holness. Cherfilus-McCormick easily defeated Republican Jason Mariner in the January 11, 2022 special election, winning 79% of the popular vote.

== Democratic primary ==
=== Campaign ===
Following Hastings' death, 11 Democratic candidates made the primary ballot to replace him.

=== Candidates ===
==== Nominee ====
- Sheila Cherfilus-McCormick, healthcare executive and candidate for this district in 2018 and 2020

==== Eliminated in primary ====
- Elvin Dowling, author
- Bobby DuBose, minority leader of the Florida House of Representatives
- Omari Hardy, state representative
- Dale Holness, Broward County commissioner and former mayor of Broward County
- Phil Jackson, retired U.S. Navy officer
- Emmanuel Morel, former federal labor investigator, candidate for Florida's 21st congressional district in 2014, and candidate for this district in 2020
- Barbara Sharief, Broward County commissioner and former mayor of Broward County
- Imran Uddin Siddiqui, internist
- Priscilla Taylor, former state representative and candidate for mayor of West Palm Beach in 2019
- Perry Thurston, state senator

==== Disqualified ====
- Natalia Allen, author
- Matt Boswell, businessman
- Krystal Jordan, counselor
- Marlon Onias, attorney
- Pradel Vilme, former Miami International Airport official

==== Declined ====
- Mack Bernard, Palm Beach County commissioner
- Shevrin Jones, state senator
- Melissa McKinlay, Palm Beach County commissioner and former mayor of Palm Beach County (endorsed Barbara Sharief)
- Bobby Powell, state senator (endorsed DuBose)
- Chris Smith, former state senator

=== Debates ===
A two-part debate was held on September 15, 2021.

2022 Florida's 20th congressional district Democratic primary debates
No.	Date & time	Host	Moderator	Link	Participants						
Key: P Participant A Absent N Non-invitee W Withdrawn											
Key: P Participant A Absent N Non-invitee W Withdrawn					Sheila Cherfilus-McCormick	Bobby DuBose	Omari Hardy	Dale Holness	Barbara Sharief	Priscilla Taylor	Perry Thurston
1	October 24, 2021	WPBF	Todd McDermott		P	A	P	P	P	A	P

=== Endorsements ===
Sheila Cherfilus-McCormick

Individuals

- Marianne Williamson, author and candidate for the Democratic nomination for president of the United States in 2020

Organizations

- Brand New Congress

Labor unions

- Communications Workers of America
Bobby DuBose

U.S. representatives

- Nikema Williams, U.S. Representative from Georgia's 5th congressional district (2021–present)

State legislators

- Kevin Chambliss, state representative
- Dan Daley, state representative
- Tracie Davis, state representative
- Evan Jenne, minority leader of the Florida House of Representatives
- Bobby Powell, state senator
Omari Hardy

State legislators

- Anna Eskamani, state representative
- Travaris McCurdy, state representative
- Carlos Guillermo Smith, state representative

Newspapers and publications

- Sun-Sentinel (Democratic primary only)

Organizations

- Progressive Change Campaign Committee
Dale Holness

State legislators

- Marie Woodson, state representative

County officials

- Gregory Tony, Broward County sheriff

Local officials

- Hazelle Rogers, mayor of Lauderdale Lakes
- Dean Trantalis, mayor of Fort Lauderdale

Labor unions

- Service Employees International Union
Barbara Sharief

U.S. representatives

- Cheri Bustos, U.S. representative from IL-17 (2013–present)
- Lois Frankel, U.S. representative from FL-21 (2013–present)

County officials

- Lamar Fisher, Broward County commissioner

Newspapers and publications

- Miami Herald
- The Palm Beach Post

Organizations

- 314 Action
- EMILY's List
Perry Thurston

State legislators

- Chris Smith, former state senator

County officials

- Steven Geller, mayor of Broward County
- Maria Sachs, Palm Beach County commissioner

=== Polling ===
Graphical summary

Poll source	Date(s) administered	Sample size (Note: Key: A – all adults RV – registered voters LV – likely voters V – unclear)	Margin of error	Sheila Cherfilus-McCormick	Bobby DuBose	Omari Hardy	Dale Holness	Barbara Sharief	Priscilla Taylor	Perry Thurston	Other	Undecided
Expedition Strategies (D) (Note: This poll was commissioned by Pro-Israel America, which did not endorse any candidate.)	October 20–24, 2021	500 (LV)	± 4.4%	15%	6%	5%	14%	13%	2%	10%	2% (Note: Jackson with 2%; Dowling, Morel, and Siddiqui with 0%)	32%
Data for Progress (D)	July 6–7, 2021	314 (LV)	± 5.0%	6%	5%	10%	17%	14%	6%	8%	5% (Note: "Another candidate" with 5%; Matt Boswell and Emmanuel Morel with 0%)	29%
Public Policy Polling (D) (Note: This poll was commissioned by a Democratic consultant expected to work in the race.)	April 2021	416 (LV)	± 4.8%	–	7%	–	13%	6%	–	11%	12% (Note: Bobby Powell with 9%; Shevrin Jones with 3%)	50%
Public Policy Polling (D)	April 2021	416 (LV)	± 4.8%	–	–	–	11%	7%	–	14%	14% (Note: Bobby Powell with 10%; Shevrin Jones with 4%)	53%
Public Policy Polling (D)	April 2021	416 (LV)	± 4.8%	–	–	–	15%	11%	–	15%	–	59%

=== Results ===
Per Florida law, because the margin separating Cherfilus-McCormick and Holness was less than 0.5%, a recount was held. Ballots received by November 12 from overseas were accepted. The two candidates were two votes apart as some ballots that had been cast were still in dispute. On November 12, over a week after the primary, the Broward County canvassing board declared Cherfilus-McCormick the winner after a recount failed to change the vote totals. However, Holness did not immediately concede, pointing out that the board had rejected twelve overseas military ballots. He said he would confer with a lawyer to decide whether or not to challenge the results. The Palm Beach County canvassing board voted to certify the election results on the same day. State officials certified the results on November 16. Cherfilus-McCormick prevailed by five votes.

Cherfilus-McCormick won in Palm Beach County, receiving 30% of the vote. Meanwhile, Holness won in Broward County, where he serves as county commissioner, with 29% of the vote.

Results by county Cherfilus-McCormick—30–40% Holness—20%-30%

Democratic primary results
Party	Candidate	Votes	%
Democratic	Sheila Cherfilus-McCormick	11,662	23.76%
Democratic	Dale Holness	11,657	23.75%
Democratic	Barbara Sharief	8,684	17.69%
Democratic	Perry Thurston	7,283	14.84%
Democratic	Bobby DuBose	3,458	7.05%
Democratic	Omari Hardy	2,902	5.91%
Democratic	Priscilla Taylor	1,677	3.42%
Democratic	Elvin Dowling	646	1.32%
Democratic	Emmanuel Morel	454	0.92%
Democratic	Phil Jackson	343	0.70%
Democratic	Imran Uddin Siddiqui	316	0.64%
Total votes		49,082	100.00%

=== Aftermath ===
Holness filed a lawsuit in Broward County Circuit Court on November 29 asking it to overturn the election results, alleging Cherfilus-McCormick to be "ineligible to hold office." The lawsuit asserts that Cherfilus-McCormick did not file proper financial paperwork and that her support for a universal basic income of $1,000 per month amounted to bribing voters. Holness claimed that voters had asked workers at polling places "where they collect the $1,000 from, so they expected to get $1,000." Election lawyer and former state representative Juan-Carlos Planas described the lawsuit as a "Hail Mary pass" and doubted it would be successful. Don James, an attorney for Holness, acknowledged that the challenge likely would not be resolved in time for the election. Mail-in ballots for the special election with Cherfilus-McCormick listed as the Democratic nominee were sent out beginning on December 3.

On December 6, Cherfilus-McCormick's attorneys filed a lengthy brief in response to the lawsuit that disputed its claims, calling it "a desperate attempt to overturn the will of the voters." In response to the allegation of bribery, the brief points out that promising monetary benefits to voters is common, comparing Cherfilus-McCormick's support for a universal basic income to "a chicken in every pot and a car in every garage," a slogan used by former president Herbert Hoover in his 1928 presidential campaign. The brief also claims that Holness's complaint was filed too late and is thus invalid, and asks the judge to dismiss it and order Holness to pay Cherfilus-McCormick's legal fees. Ultimately, Holness's challenge fell flat, as no judge took up the case.

== Republican primary ==
=== Campaign ===
Two Republicans made the primary ballot, businessman Jason Mariner and Greg Musselwhite, who had been the Republican nominee for the seat in 2020. The two men cut different appearances on the campaign trail, with Mariner presenting himself in a clean-cut fashion while Musselwhite campaigned in a more folksy manner. A substantial part of Mariner's campaign was based around his turning his life around after previously being imprisoned twice on various felony charges. Musselwhite attacked Mariner for his prior felony convictions, claiming in a later-deleted Facebook post that voters had a choice between "the correctional officer or the inmate".

Mariner ran as an "America First conservative", promoting false claims that the results of the 2020 presidential election were illegitimate, as well as making statements in support of the rioters at the 2021 U.S. Capitol attack and the Confederate Flag, which he defended as a "battle flag that was later co-opted by racist groups".

=== Candidates ===
==== Nominee ====
- Jason Mariner, businessman

==== Eliminated in primary ====
- Gregory "Greg" Musselwhite, welding inspector and nominee for this district in 2020

==== Disqualified ====
- Vic DeGrammont, realtor
- Roland Florez
- Lateresa Jones, perennial candidate
- Bernard Sansaricq, former president of the Haiti Senate

=== Endorsements ===
Jason Mariner

U.S. representatives

- Brian Mast, U.S. representative from Florida's 18th congressional district

State officials

- Rick Roth, state representative

Newspapers and publications

- Sun-Sentinel (Republican primary only)

Individuals

- Roger Stone, conservative political consultant

=== Results ===
Results by county Mariner—50–60%

Republican primary results
Party	Candidate	Votes	%
Republican	Jason Mariner	3,500	57.82%
Republican	Greg Musselwhite	2,553	42.18%
Total votes		6,053	100.00%

== Independent and third-party candidates ==
=== Libertarian Party ===
==== Declared ====
- Mike ter Maat, economist and Hallandale Beach police officer

=== Independents ===
==== Declared ====
- Jim Flynn, real estate broker
- Leonard Serratore, Palm Beach International Airport official

==== Disqualified ====
- Robert Ornelas, perennial candidate

== General election ==
=== Predictions ===
Source	Ranking	As of
The Cook Political Report	Solid D	October 15, 2021
Inside Elections	Solid D	January 10, 2022
Sabato's Crystal Ball	Safe D	May 20, 2021

=== Endorsements ===
Endorsements in bold were made after the primary elections.

Sheila Cherfilus-McCormick (D)

State officials

- **Richard Stark**, state representative

County officials

- **Mack Bernard**, Palm Beach County commissioner

Individuals

- Marianne Williamson, author and candidate for the Democratic nomination for president of the United States in 2020

Organizations

- Brand New Congress
- **Florida College Democrats**
- **Florida Democratic Party – LGBTQ+ Caucus**
- **Sierra Club**

Labor unions

- Communications Workers of America
Jason Mariner (R)

U.S. representatives

- **Newt Gingrich**, former U.S. representative from Georgia's 6th congressional district and former speaker of the United States House of Representatives
- Brian Mast, U.S. representative from Florida's 18th congressional district
- **Burgess Owens**, U.S. representative from Utah's 4th congressional district

State officials

- Rick Roth, state representative

Individuals

- Roger Stone, conservative political consultant
Declined to endorse

Newspapers and publications

- The Palm Beach Post
- Sun-Sentinel

=== Results ===
As expected by election prognosticators, Cherfilus-McCormick won the special election by a landslide, winning 79% of the popular vote. In spite of this, Mariner refused to concede, threatening to file a lawsuit to dispute the results.

2022 Florida's 20th congressional district special election results
Party	Candidate	Votes	%
**Democratic**	**Sheila Cherfilus-McCormick**	**44,707**	**78.96%**
Republican	Jason Mariner	10,966	19.37%
Libertarian	Mike ter Maat	395	0.70%
Independent	Jim Flynn	265	0.47%
Independent	Leonard Serratore	262	0.46%
Write-ins		22	0.04%
Total votes		**56,617**	**100.00%**
Democratic **hold**			

By county

County	Sheila Cherfilus-McCormick Democratic		Jason Mariner Republican		Mike ter Maat Libertarian		Various candidates Other parties		Margin		Total votes
County	#	%	#	%	#	%	#	%	#	%	Total votes
Broward (part)	**32,867**	**82.74**	6,228	15.68	252	0.63	375	0.94	26,639	67.06	**39,722**
Palm Beach (part)	**11,840**	**70.08**	4,738	28.04	143	0.85	174	1.03	7,102	42.04	**16,895**
Totals	**44,707**	**78.96**	10,966	19.37	395	0.70	549	0.97	**33,741**	**59.59**	**56,617**

== See also ==
- 2022 United States House of Representatives elections
- 2022 United States elections
- 117th United States Congress
- List of special elections to the United States House of Representatives

== Notes ==
Partisan clients
