= List of United States representatives in the 119th Congress =

Since the congress is almost over, as good a time as any

This is a complete list of United States representatives during the 119th United States Congress, which runs from January 3, 2025, through January 3, 2027, ordered by seniority. (Note: Delegates are non-voting members and Representatives are voting members of the United States House of Representatives.)

== Seniority list ==
| Rank | Member | Party | District | Seniority date | Previous service (Note: Members elected with substantial prior service receive credit for part of that service when calculating seniority.) | Committee and leadership positions |
|---|---|---|---|---|---|---|
| 1 | Hal Rogers | R | Kentucky 5 | January 3, 1981 | | Dean of the House |
| 2 | Chris Smith | R | New Jersey 4 | January 3, 1981 | | |
| 3 | Steny Hoyer | D | Maryland 5 | May 19, 1981 | | |
| 4 | Marcy Kaptur | D | Ohio 9 | January 3, 1983 | | |
| 5 | Nancy Pelosi | D | California 11 | June 2, 1987 | | |
| 6 | Frank Pallone | D | New Jersey 6 | November 8, 1988 | | Ranking Member: Energy and Commerce |
| 7 | Richard Neal | D | Massachusetts 1 | January 3, 1989 | | Ranking Member: Ways and Means |
| 8 | Rosa DeLauro | D | Connecticut 3 | January 3, 1991 | | Ranking Member: Appropriations |
| 9 | Maxine Waters | D | California 43 | January 3, 1991 | | Ranking Member: Financial Services |
| 10 | Jerry Nadler | D | New York 12 | November 3, 1992 | | |
| 11 | Sanford Bishop | D | Georgia 2 | January 3, 1993 | | |
| 12 | Ken Calvert | R | California 41 | January 3, 1993 | | |
| 13 | Jim Clyburn | D | South Carolina 6 | January 3, 1993 | | |
| 14 | Bobby Scott | D | Virginia 3 | January 3, 1993 | | Ranking Member: Education and Workforce |
| 15 | Nydia Velázquez | D | New York 7 | January 3, 1993 | | Ranking Member: Small Business |
| 16 | Bennie Thompson | D | Mississippi 2 | April 13, 1993 | | Ranking Member: Homeland Security |
| 17 | Frank Lucas | R | Oklahoma 3 | May 10, 1994 | | |
| 18 | Lloyd Doggett | D | Texas 37 | January 3, 1995 | | |
| 19 | Zoe Lofgren | D | California 18 | January 3, 1995 | | Ranking Member: Science, Space and Technology |
| 20 | Robert Aderholt | R | Alabama 4 | January 3, 1997 | | |
| 21 | Danny Davis | D | Illinois 7 | January 3, 1997 | | |
| 22 | Diana DeGette | D | Colorado 1 | January 3, 1997 | | |
| 23 | Jim McGovern | D | Massachusetts 2 | January 3, 1997 | | Ranking Member: Rules |
| 24 | Brad Sherman | D | California 32 | January 3, 1997 | | |
| 25 | Adam Smith | D | Washington 9 | January 3, 1997 | | Ranking Member: Armed Services |
| 26 | Gregory Meeks | D | New York 5 | February 3, 1998 | | Ranking Member: Foreign Affairs |
| 27 | John B. Larson | D | Connecticut 1 | January 3, 1999 | | |
| 28 | Jan Schakowsky | D | Illinois 9 | January 3, 1999 | | |
| 29 | Mike Simpson | R | Idaho 2 | January 3, 1999 | | |
| 30 | Mike Thompson | D | California 4 | January 3, 1999 | | |
| 31 | Pete Sessions | R | Texas 17 | January 3, 2021 | 1997–2019 | |
| 32 | Sam Graves | R | Missouri 6 | January 3, 2001 | | Chair: Transportation and Infrastructure |
| 33 | Rick Larsen | D | Washington 2 | January 3, 2001 | | Ranking Member: Transportation and Infrastructure |
| 34 | Betty McCollum | D | Minnesota 4 | January 3, 2001 | | |
| 35 | Stephen Lynch | D | Massachusetts 8 | October 16, 2001 | | (Acting) Ranking Member: Oversight and Government Reform from April 28, 2025; until June 24, 2025 |
| 36 | Joe Wilson | R | South Carolina 2 | December 18, 2001 | | |
| 37 | John Carter | R | Texas 31 | January 3, 2003 | | |
| 38 | Tom Cole | R | Oklahoma 4 | January 3, 2003 | | Chair: Appropriations |
| 39 | Mario Díaz-Balart | R | Florida 26 | January 3, 2003 | | |
| 40 | Raúl Grijalva | D | Arizona 7 | January 3, 2003 | | Died on March 13, 2025 |
| 41 | Mike Rogers | R | Alabama 3 | January 3, 2003 | | Chair: Armed Services |
| 42 | Linda Sánchez | D | California 38 | January 3, 2003 | | |
| 43 | David Scott | D | Georgia 13 | January 3, 2003 | | Died on April 22, 2026 |
| 44 | Mike Turner | R | Ohio 10 | January 3, 2003 | | |
| 45 | Darrell Issa | R | California 48 | January 3, 2021 | 2001–2019 | |
| 46 | Emanuel Cleaver | D | Missouri 5 | January 3, 2005 | | |
| 47 | Jim Costa | D | California 21 | January 3, 2005 | | |
| 48 | Henry Cuellar | D | Texas 28 | January 3, 2005 | | |
| 49 | Virginia Foxx | R | North Carolina 5 | January 3, 2005 | | Chair: Rules |
| 50 | Al Green | D | Texas 9 | January 3, 2005 | | |
| 51 | Michael McCaul | R | Texas 10 | January 3, 2005 | | |
| 52 | Gwen Moore | D | Wisconsin 4 | January 3, 2005 | | |
| 53 | Debbie Wasserman Schultz | D | Florida 25 | January 3, 2005 | | |
| 54 | Doris Matsui | D | California 7 | March 8, 2005 | | |
| 55 | Gus Bilirakis | R | Florida 12 | January 3, 2007 | | |
| 56 | Vern Buchanan | R | Florida 16 | January 3, 2007 | | |
| 57 | Kathy Castor | D | Florida 14 | January 3, 2007 | | |
| 58 | Yvette Clarke | D | New York 9 | January 3, 2007 | | |
| 59 | Steve Cohen | D | Tennessee 9 | January 3, 2007 | | |
| 60 | Joe Courtney | D | Connecticut 2 | January 3, 2007 | | |
| 61 | Hank Johnson | D | Georgia 4 | January 3, 2007 | | |
| 62 | Jim Jordan | R | Ohio 4 | January 3, 2007 | | Chair: Judiciary |
| 63 | Adrian Smith | R | Nebraska 3 | January 3, 2007 | | |
| 64 | Bob Latta | R | Ohio 5 | December 11, 2007 | | |
| 65 | Rob Wittman | R | Virginia 1 | December 11, 2007 | | |
| 66 | André Carson | D | Indiana 7 | March 11, 2008 | | |
| 67 | Steve Scalise | R | Louisiana 1 | May 3, 2008 | | Majority Leader |
| 68 | Gerry Connolly | D | Virginia 11 | January 3, 2009 | | Ranking Member: Oversight and Government Reform until May 21, 2025 (on leave from April 28, 2025); Died on May 21, 2025 |
| 69 | Brett Guthrie | R | Kentucky 2 | January 3, 2009 | | Chair: Energy and Commerce |
| 70 | Jim Himes | D | Connecticut 4 | January 3, 2009 | | Ranking Member: Intelligence |
| 71 | Tom McClintock | R | California 5 | January 3, 2009 | | |
| 72 | Chellie Pingree | D | Maine 1 | January 3, 2009 | | |
| 73 | Glenn Thompson | R | Pennsylvania 15 | January 3, 2009 | | Chair: Agriculture |
| 74 | Paul Tonko | D | New York 20 | January 3, 2009 | | |
| 75 | Mike Quigley | D | Illinois 5 | April 7, 2009 | | |
| 76 | Judy Chu | D | California 28 | July 14, 2009 | | |
| 77 | John Garamendi | D | California 8 | November 3, 2009 | | |
| 78 | Tim Walberg | R | Michigan 5 | January 3, 2011 | 2007–2009 | Chair: Education and Workforce |
| 79 | Bill Foster | D | Illinois 11 | January 3, 2013 | 2008–2011 | |
| 80 | Kweisi Mfume | D | Maryland 7 | April 28, 2020 | 1987–1996 | |
| 81 | Rick Crawford | R | Arkansas 1 | January 3, 2011 | | Chair: Intelligence |
| 82 | Scott DesJarlais | R | Tennessee 4 | January 3, 2011 | | |
| 83 | Chuck Fleischmann | R | Tennessee 3 | January 3, 2011 | | |
| 84 | Paul Gosar | R | Arizona 9 | January 3, 2011 | | |
| 85 | Morgan Griffith | R | Virginia 9 | January 3, 2011 | | |
| 86 | Andy Harris | R | Maryland 1 | January 3, 2011 | | |
| 87 | Bill Huizenga | R | Michigan 4 | January 3, 2011 | | |
| 88 | Bill Keating | D | Massachusetts 9 | January 3, 2011 | | |
| 89 | Mike Kelly | R | Pennsylvania 16 | January 3, 2011 | | |
| 90 | David Schweikert | R | Arizona 1 | January 3, 2011 | | |
| 91 | Austin Scott | R | Georgia 8 | January 3, 2011 | | |
| 92 | Terri Sewell | D | Alabama 7 | January 3, 2011 | | |
| 93 | Daniel Webster | R | Florida 11 | January 3, 2011 | | |
| 94 | Frederica Wilson | D | Florida 24 | January 3, 2011 | | |
| 95 | Steve Womack | R | Arkansas 3 | January 3, 2011 | | |
| 96 | Mark Amodei | R | Nevada 2 | September 13, 2011 | | |
| 97 | Suzanne Bonamici | D | Oregon 1 | January 31, 2012 | | |
| 98 | Suzan DelBene | D | Washington 1 | November 6, 2012 | | |
| 99 | Thomas Massie | R | Kentucky 4 | November 6, 2012 | | |
| 100 | Dina Titus | D | Nevada 1 | January 3, 2013 | 2009–2011 | |
| 101 | Andy Barr | R | Kentucky 6 | January 3, 2013 | | |
| 102 | Joyce Beatty | D | Ohio 3 | January 3, 2013 | | |
| 103 | Ami Bera | D | California 6 | January 3, 2013 | | |
| 104 | Julia Brownley | D | California 26 | January 3, 2013 | | |
| 105 | Joaquin Castro | D | Texas 20 | January 3, 2013 | | |
| 106 | Lois Frankel | D | Florida 22 | January 3, 2013 | | |
| 107 | Richard Hudson | R | North Carolina 9 | January 3, 2013 | | |
| 108 | Jared Huffman | D | California 2 | January 3, 2013 | | Ranking Member: Natural Resources |
| 109 | Hakeem Jeffries | D | New York 8 | January 3, 2013 | | Minority Leader |
| 110 | David Joyce | R | Ohio 14 | January 3, 2013 | | |
| 111 | Doug LaMalfa | R | California 1 | January 3, 2013 | | Died on January 6, 2026 |
| 112 | Grace Meng | D | New York 6 | January 3, 2013 | | |
| 113 | Scott Perry | R | Pennsylvania 10 | January 3, 2013 | | |
| 114 | Scott Peters | D | California 50 | January 3, 2013 | | |
| 115 | Mark Pocan | D | Wisconsin 2 | January 3, 2013 | | |
| 116 | Raul Ruiz | D | California 25 | January 3, 2013 | | |
| 117 | Eric Swalwell | D | California 14 | January 3, 2013 | | Resigned on April 14, 2026 |
| 118 | Mark Takano | D | California 39 | January 3, 2013 | | Ranking Member: Veterans' Affairs |
| 119 | Juan Vargas | D | California 52 | January 3, 2013 | | |
| 120 | Marc Veasey | D | Texas 33 | January 3, 2013 | | |
| 121 | Ann Wagner | R | Missouri 2 | January 3, 2013 | | |
| 122 | Randy Weber | R | Texas 14 | January 3, 2013 | | |
| 123 | Roger Williams | R | Texas 25 | January 3, 2013 | | Chair: Small Business |
| 124 | Robin Kelly | D | Illinois 2 | April 9, 2013 | | |
| 125 | Jason Smith | R | Missouri 8 | June 4, 2013 | | Chair: Ways and Means |
| 126 | Katherine Clark | D | Massachusetts 5 | December 10, 2013 | | Minority Whip |
| 127 | Alma Adams | D | North Carolina 12 | November 4, 2014 | | |
| 128 | Donald Norcross | D | New Jersey 1 | November 4, 2014 | | |
| 129 | Ed Case | D | Hawaii 1 | January 3, 2019 | 2002–2007 | |
| 130 | Pete Aguilar | D | California 33 | January 3, 2015 | | |
| 131 | Rick Allen | R | Georgia 12 | January 3, 2015 | | |
| 132 | Brian Babin | R | Texas 36 | January 3, 2015 | | Chair: Science, Space and Technology |
| 133 | Don Beyer | D | Virginia 8 | January 3, 2015 | | |
| 134 | Mike Bost | R | Illinois 12 | January 3, 2015 | | Chair: Veterans' Affairs |
| 135 | Brendan Boyle | D | Pennsylvania 2 | January 3, 2015 | | Ranking Member: Budget |
| 136 | Buddy Carter | R | Georgia 1 | January 3, 2015 | | |
| 137 | Mark DeSaulnier | D | California 10 | January 3, 2015 | | Ranking Member: Ethics |
| 138 | Debbie Dingell | D | Michigan 6 | January 3, 2015 | | |
| 139 | Tom Emmer | R | Minnesota 6 | January 3, 2015 | | Majority Whip |
| 140 | Glenn Grothman | R | Wisconsin 6 | January 3, 2015 | | |
| 141 | French Hill | R | Arkansas 2 | January 3, 2015 | | Chair: Financial Services |
| 142 | Ted Lieu | D | California 36 | January 3, 2015 | | Democratic Caucus Chairman |
| 143 | Barry Loudermilk | R | Georgia 11 | January 3, 2015 | | |
| 144 | John Moolenaar | R | Michigan 2 | January 3, 2015 | | Chair: China |
| 145 | Seth Moulton | D | Massachusetts 6 | January 3, 2015 | | |
| 146 | Dan Newhouse | R | Washington 4 | January 3, 2015 | | |
| 147 | Gary Palmer | R | Alabama 6 | January 3, 2015 | | |
| 148 | David Rouzer | R | North Carolina 7 | January 3, 2015 | | |
| 149 | Elise Stefanik | R | New York 21 | January 3, 2015 | | |
| 150 | Norma Torres | D | California 35 | January 3, 2015 | | |
| 151 | Bonnie Watson Coleman | D | New Jersey 12 | January 3, 2015 | | |
| 152 | Bruce Westerman | R | Arkansas 4 | January 3, 2015 | | Chair: Natural Resources |
| 153 | Trent Kelly | R | Mississippi 1 | June 2, 2015 | | |
| 154 | Darin LaHood | R | Illinois 16 | September 10, 2015 | | |
| 155 | Warren Davidson | R | Ohio 8 | June 7, 2016 | | |
| 156 | James Comer | R | Kentucky 1 | November 8, 2016 | | Chair: Oversight and Government Reform |
| 157 | Dwight Evans | D | Pennsylvania 3 | November 8, 2016 | | |
| 158 | Brad Schneider | D | Illinois 10 | January 3, 2017 | 2013–2015 | |
| 159 | David Valadao | R | California 22 | January 3, 2021 | 2013–2019 | |
| 160 | Jodey Arrington | R | Texas 19 | January 3, 2017 | | Chair: Budget |
| 161 | Don Bacon | R | Nebraska 2 | January 3, 2017 | | |
| 162 | Nanette Barragán | D | California 44 | January 3, 2017 | | |
| 163 | Jack Bergman | R | Michigan 1 | January 3, 2017 | | |
| 164 | Andy Biggs | R | Arizona 5 | January 3, 2017 | | |
| 165 | Salud Carbajal | D | California 24 | January 3, 2017 | | |
| 166 | Lou Correa | D | California 46 | January 3, 2017 | | |
| 167 | Neal Dunn | R | Florida 2 | January 3, 2017 | | |
| 168 | Adriano Espaillat | D | New York 13 | January 3, 2017 | | |
| 169 | Brian Fitzpatrick | R | Pennsylvania 1 | January 3, 2017 | | |
| 170 | Vicente Gonzalez | D | Texas 34 | January 3, 2017 | | |
| 171 | Josh Gottheimer | D | New Jersey 5 | January 3, 2017 | | |
| 172 | Clay Higgins | R | Louisiana 3 | January 3, 2017 | | |
| 173 | Pramila Jayapal | D | Washington 7 | January 3, 2017 | | |
| 174 | Mike Johnson | R | Louisiana 4 | January 3, 2017 | | Speaker of the House |
| 175 | Ro Khanna | D | California 17 | January 3, 2017 | | |
| 176 | Raja Krishnamoorthi | D | Illinois 8 | January 3, 2017 | | Ranking Member: China |
| 177 | David Kustoff | R | Tennessee 8 | January 3, 2017 | | |
| 178 | Brian Mast | R | Florida 21 | January 3, 2017 | | Chair: Foreign Affairs |
| 179 | Jimmy Panetta | D | California 19 | January 3, 2017 | | |
| 180 | Jamie Raskin | D | Maryland 8 | January 3, 2017 | | Ranking Member: Judiciary |
| 181 | John Rutherford | R | Florida 5 | January 3, 2017 | | |
| 182 | Lloyd Smucker | R | Pennsylvania 11 | January 3, 2017 | | |
| 183 | Darren Soto | D | Florida 9 | January 3, 2017 | | |
| 184 | Ron Estes | R | Kansas 4 | April 11, 2017 | | |
| 185 | Jimmy Gomez | D | California 34 | June 6, 2017 | | |
| 186 | Ralph Norman | R | South Carolina 5 | June 20, 2017 | | |
| 187 | Michael Cloud | R | Texas 27 | June 30, 2018 | | |
| 188 | Troy Balderson | R | Ohio 12 | August 7, 2018 | | |
| 189 | Marlin Stutzman | R | Indiana 3 | January 3, 2025 | 2010–2017 | |
| 190 | Kevin Hern | R | Oklahoma 1 | November 6, 2018 | | |
| 191 | Joseph Morelle | D | New York 25 | November 6, 2018 | | Ranking Member: House Administration |
| 192 | Mary Gay Scanlon | D | Pennsylvania 5 | November 6, 2018 | | |
| 193 | Steven Horsford | D | Nevada 4 | January 3, 2019 | 2013–2015 | |
| 194 | Tom Suozzi | D | New York 3 | February 13, 2024 | 2017–2023 | |
| 195 | Jim Baird | R | Indiana 4 | January 3, 2019 | | |
| 196 | Tim Burchett | R | Tennessee 2 | January 3, 2019 | | |
| 197 | Sean Casten | D | Illinois 6 | January 3, 2019 | | |
| 198 | Ben Cline | R | Virginia 6 | January 3, 2019 | | |
| 199 | Angie Craig | D | Minnesota 2 | January 3, 2019 | | Ranking Member: Agriculture |
| 200 | Dan Crenshaw | R | Texas 2 | January 3, 2019 | | |
| 201 | Jason Crow | D | Colorado 6 | January 3, 2019 | | |
| 202 | Sharice Davids | D | Kansas 3 | January 3, 2019 | | |
| 203 | Madeleine Dean | D | Pennsylvania 4 | January 3, 2019 | | |
| 204 | Veronica Escobar | D | Texas 16 | January 3, 2019 | | |
| 205 | Lizzie Fletcher | D | Texas 7 | January 3, 2019 | | |
| 206 | Russ Fulcher | R | Idaho 1 | January 3, 2019 | | |
| 207 | Chuy García | D | Illinois 4 | January 3, 2019 | | |
| 208 | Sylvia Garcia | D | Texas 29 | January 3, 2019 | | |
| 209 | Jared Golden | D | Maine 2 | January 3, 2019 | | |
| 210 | Lance Gooden | R | Texas 5 | January 3, 2019 | | |
| 211 | Mark Green | R | Tennessee 7 | January 3, 2019 | | Chair: Homeland Security; Resigned on July 20, 2025 |
| 212 | Michael Guest | R | Mississippi 3 | January 3, 2019 | | Chair: Ethics |
| 213 | Josh Harder | D | California 9 | January 3, 2019 | | |
| 214 | Jahana Hayes | D | Connecticut 5 | January 3, 2019 | | |
| 215 | Chrissy Houlahan | D | Pennsylvania 6 | January 3, 2019 | | |
| 216 | Dusty Johnson | R | South Dakota at-large | January 3, 2019 | | |
| 217 | John Joyce | R | Pennsylvania 13 | January 3, 2019 | | |
| 218 | Susie Lee | D | Nevada 3 | January 3, 2019 | | |
| 219 | Mike Levin | D | California 49 | January 3, 2019 | | |
| 220 | Lucy McBath | D | Georgia 6 | January 3, 2019 | | |
| 221 | Dan Meuser | R | Pennsylvania 9 | January 3, 2019 | | |
| 222 | Carol Miller | R | West Virginia 1 | January 3, 2019 | | |
| 223 | Joe Neguse | D | Colorado 2 | January 3, 2019 | | Assistant Democratic Leader |
| 224 | Alexandria Ocasio-Cortez | D | New York 14 | January 3, 2019 | | |
| 225 | Ilhan Omar | D | Minnesota 5 | January 3, 2019 | | |
| 226 | Chris Pappas | D | New Hampshire 1 | January 3, 2019 | | |
| 227 | Ayanna Pressley | D | Massachusetts 7 | January 3, 2019 | | |
| 228 | Guy Reschenthaler | R | Pennsylvania 14 | January 3, 2019 | | |
| 229 | John Rose | R | Tennessee 6 | January 3, 2019 | | |
| 230 | Chip Roy | R | Texas 21 | January 3, 2019 | | |
| 231 | Kim Schrier | D | Washington 8 | January 3, 2019 | | |
| 232 | Mikie Sherrill | D | New Jersey 11 | January 3, 2019 | | Resigned on November 20, 2025 |
| 233 | Greg Stanton | D | Arizona 4 | January 3, 2019 | | |
| 234 | Pete Stauber | R | Minnesota 8 | January 3, 2019 | | |
| 235 | Bryan Steil | R | Wisconsin 1 | January 3, 2019 | | Chair: House Administration |
| 236 | Greg Steube | R | Florida 17 | January 3, 2019 | | |
| 237 | Haley Stevens | D | Michigan 11 | January 3, 2019 | | |
| 238 | William Timmons | R | South Carolina 4 | January 3, 2019 | | |
| 239 | Rashida Tlaib | D | Michigan 12 | January 3, 2019 | | |
| 240 | Lori Trahan | D | Massachusetts 3 | January 3, 2019 | | |
| 241 | Lauren Underwood | D | Illinois 14 | January 3, 2019 | | |
| 242 | Jeff Van Drew | R (Note: A party change does not affect seniority.) | New Jersey 2 | January 3, 2019 | | |
| 243 | Michael Waltz | R | Florida 6 | January 3, 2019 | | Resigned on January 20, 2025 |
| 244 | Greg Murphy | R | North Carolina 3 | September 10, 2019 | | |
| 245 | Tom Tiffany | R | Wisconsin 7 | May 12, 2020 | | |
| 246 | Claudia Tenney | R | New York 24 | February 11, 2021 | 2017–2019 | |
| 247 | Jake Auchincloss | D | Massachusetts 4 | January 3, 2021 | | |
| 248 | Cliff Bentz | R | Oregon 2 | January 3, 2021 | | |
| 249 | Stephanie Bice | R | Oklahoma 5 | January 3, 2021 | | |
| 250 | Lauren Boebert | R | Colorado 4 | January 3, 2021 | | |
| 251 | Kat Cammack | R | Florida 3 | January 3, 2021 | | |
| 252 | Andrew Clyde | R | Georgia 9 | January 3, 2021 | | |
| 253 | Byron Donalds | R | Florida 19 | January 3, 2021 | | |
| 254 | Pat Fallon | R | Texas 4 | January 3, 2021 | | |
| 255 | Randy Feenstra | R | Iowa 4 | January 3, 2021 | | |
| 256 | Michelle Fischbach | R | Minnesota 7 | January 3, 2021 | | |
| 257 | Scott L. Fitzgerald | R | Wisconsin 5 | January 3, 2021 | | |
| 258 | Scott Franklin | R | Florida 18 | January 3, 2021 | | |
| 259 | Andrew Garbarino | R | New York 2 | January 3, 2021 | | Chair: Homeland Security from July 22, 2025 |
| 260 | Carlos A. Giménez | R | Florida 28 | January 3, 2021 | | |
| 261 | Tony Gonzales | R | Texas 23 | January 3, 2021 | | Resigned on April 14, 2026 |
| 262 | Marjorie Taylor Greene | R | Georgia 14 | January 3, 2021 | | Resigned on January 5, 2026 |
| 263 | Diana Harshbarger | R | Tennessee 1 | January 3, 2021 | | |
| 264 | Ashley Hinson | R | Iowa 2 | January 3, 2021 | | |
| 265 | Ronny Jackson | R | Texas 13 | January 3, 2021 | | |
| 266 | Sara Jacobs | D | California 51 | January 3, 2021 | | |
| 267 | Young Kim | R | California 40 | January 3, 2021 | | |
| 268 | Teresa Leger Fernandez | D | New Mexico 3 | January 3, 2021 | | |
| 269 | Nancy Mace | R | South Carolina 1 | January 3, 2021 | | |
| 270 | Nicole Malliotakis | R | New York 11 | January 3, 2021 | | |
| 271 | Tracey Mann | R | Kansas 1 | January 3, 2021 | | |
| 272 | Lisa McClain | R | Michigan 9 | January 3, 2021 | | Republican Conference Chairwoman |
| 273 | Mary Miller | R | Illinois 15 | January 3, 2021 | | |
| 274 | Mariannette Miller-Meeks | R | Iowa 1 | January 3, 2021 | | |
| 275 | Barry Moore | R | Alabama 1 | January 3, 2021 | | |
| 276 | Blake Moore | R | Utah 1 | January 3, 2021 | | |
| 277 | Frank J. Mrvan | D | Indiana 1 | January 3, 2021 | | |
| 278 | Troy Nehls | R | Texas 22 | January 3, 2021 | | |
| 279 | Jay Obernolte | R | California 23 | January 3, 2021 | | |
| 280 | Burgess Owens | R | Utah 4 | January 3, 2021 | | |
| 281 | August Pfluger | R | Texas 11 | January 3, 2021 | | |
| 282 | Deborah Ross | D | North Carolina 2 | January 3, 2021 | | |
| 283 | María Elvira Salazar | R | Florida 27 | January 3, 2021 | | |
| 284 | Victoria Spartz | R | Indiana 5 | January 3, 2021 | | |
| 285 | Marilyn Strickland | D | Washington 10 | January 3, 2021 | | |
| 286 | Ritchie Torres | D | New York 15 | January 3, 2021 | | |
| 287 | Beth Van Duyne | R | Texas 24 | January 3, 2021 | | |
| 288 | Nikema Williams | D | Georgia 5 | January 3, 2021 | | |
| 289 | Julia Letlow | R | Louisiana 5 | March 20, 2021 | | |
| 290 | Troy Carter | D | Louisiana 2 | April 24, 2021 | | |
| 291 | Melanie Stansbury | D | New Mexico 1 | June 1, 2021 | | |
| 292 | Jake Ellzey | R | Texas 6 | July 27, 2021 | | |
| 293 | Shontel Brown | D | Ohio 11 | November 2, 2021 | | |
| 294 | Mike Carey | R | Ohio 15 | November 2, 2021 | | |
| 295 | Sheila Cherfilus-McCormick | D | Florida 20 | January 11, 2022 | | Resigned on April 21, 2026 |
| 296 | Mike Flood | R | Nebraska 1 | June 28, 2022 | | |
| 297 | Brad Finstad | R | Minnesota 1 | August 9, 2022 | | |
| 298 | Pat Ryan | D | New York 18 | August 23, 2022 | | |
| 299 | Rudy Yakym | R | Indiana 2 | November 8, 2022 | | |
| 300 | Cleo Fields | D | Louisiana 6 | January 3, 2025 | 1993–1997 | |
| 301 | Ryan Zinke | R | Montana 1 | January 3, 2023 | 2015–2017 | |
| 302 | Mark Alford | R | Missouri 4 | January 3, 2023 | | |
| 303 | Becca Balint | D | Vermont at-large | January 3, 2023 | | |
| 304 | Aaron Bean | R | Florida 4 | January 3, 2023 | | |
| 305 | Josh Brecheen | R | Oklahoma 2 | January 3, 2023 | | |
| 306 | Nikki Budzinski | D | Illinois 13 | January 3, 2023 | | |
| 307 | Eric Burlison | R | Missouri 7 | January 3, 2023 | | |
| 308 | Greg Casar | D | Texas 35 | January 3, 2023 | | |
| 309 | Juan Ciscomani | R | Arizona 6 | January 3, 2023 | | |
| 310 | Mike Collins | R | Georgia 10 | January 3, 2023 | | |
| 311 | Eli Crane | R | Arizona 2 | January 3, 2023 | | |
| 312 | Jasmine Crockett | D | Texas 30 | January 3, 2023 | | |
| 313 | Don Davis | D | North Carolina 1 | January 3, 2023 | | |
| 314 | Monica De La Cruz | R | Texas 15 | January 3, 2023 | | |
| 315 | Chris Deluzio | D | Pennsylvania 17 | January 3, 2023 | | |
| 316 | Chuck Edwards | R | North Carolina 11 | January 3, 2023 | | |
| 317 | Mike Ezell | R | Mississippi 4 | January 3, 2023 | | |
| 318 | Valerie Foushee | D | North Carolina 4 | January 3, 2023 | | |
| 319 | Maxwell Frost | D | Florida 10 | January 3, 2023 | | |
| 320 | Russell Fry | R | South Carolina 7 | January 3, 2023 | | |
| 321 | Robert Garcia | D | California 42 | January 3, 2023 | | Ranking Member: Oversight and Government Reform from June 24, 2025 |
| 322 | Marie Gluesenkamp Pérez | D | Washington 3 | January 3, 2023 | | |
| 323 | Dan Goldman | D | New York 10 | January 3, 2023 | | |
| 324 | Harriet Hageman | R | Wyoming at-large | January 3, 2023 | | |
| 325 | Erin Houchin | R | Indiana 9 | January 3, 2023 | | |
| 326 | Val Hoyle | D | Oregon 4 | January 3, 2023 | | |
| 327 | Wesley Hunt | R | Texas 38 | January 3, 2023 | | |
| 328 | Glenn Ivey | D | Maryland 4 | January 3, 2023 | | |
| 329 | Jonathan Jackson | D | Illinois 1 | January 3, 2023 | | |
| 330 | John James | R | Michigan 10 | January 3, 2023 | | |
| 331 | Sydney Kamlager-Dove | D | California 37 | January 3, 2023 | | |
| 332 | Thomas Kean Jr. | R | New Jersey 7 | January 3, 2023 | | |
| 333 | Jen Kiggans | R | Virginia 2 | January 3, 2023 | | |
| 334 | Kevin Kiley | R | California 3 | January 3, 2023 | | |
| 335 | Nick LaLota | R | New York 1 | January 3, 2023 | | |
| 336 | Greg Landsman | D | Ohio 1 | January 3, 2023 | | |
| 337 | Nick Langworthy | R | New York 23 | January 3, 2023 | | |
| 338 | Mike Lawler | R | New York 17 | January 3, 2023 | | |
| 339 | Laurel Lee | R | Florida 15 | January 3, 2023 | | |
| 340 | Summer Lee | D | Pennsylvania 12 | January 3, 2023 | | |
| 341 | Anna Paulina Luna | R | Florida 13 | January 3, 2023 | | |
| 342 | Morgan Luttrell | R | Texas 8 | January 3, 2023 | | |
| 343 | Seth Magaziner | D | Rhode Island 2 | January 3, 2023 | | |
| 344 | Rich McCormick | R | Georgia 7 | January 3, 2023 | | |
| 345 | Morgan McGarvey | D | Kentucky 3 | January 3, 2023 | | |
| 346 | Rob Menendez | D | New Jersey 8 | January 3, 2023 | | |
| 347 | Max Miller | R | Ohio 7 | January 3, 2023 | | |
| 348 | Cory Mills | R | Florida 7 | January 3, 2023 | | |
| 349 | Nathaniel Moran | R | Texas 1 | January 3, 2023 | | |
| 350 | Jared Moskowitz | D | Florida 23 | January 3, 2023 | | |
| 351 | Kevin Mullin | D | California 15 | January 3, 2023 | | |
| 352 | Zach Nunn | R | Iowa 3 | January 3, 2023 | | |
| 353 | Andy Ogles | R | Tennessee 5 | January 3, 2023 | | |
| 354 | Brittany Pettersen | D | Colorado 7 | January 3, 2023 | | |
| 355 | Delia Ramirez | D | Illinois 3 | January 3, 2023 | | |
| 356 | Andrea Salinas | D | Oregon 6 | January 3, 2023 | | |
| 357 | Hillary Scholten | D | Michigan 3 | January 3, 2023 | | |
| 358 | Keith Self | R | Texas 3 | January 3, 2023 | | |
| 359 | Eric Sorensen | D | Illinois 17 | January 3, 2023 | | |
| 360 | Dale Strong | R | Alabama 5 | January 3, 2023 | | |
| 361 | Emilia Sykes | D | Ohio 13 | January 3, 2023 | | |
| 362 | Shri Thanedar | D | Michigan 13 | January 3, 2023 | | |
| 363 | Jill Tokuda | D | Hawaii 2 | January 3, 2023 | | |
| 364 | Derrick Van Orden | R | Wisconsin 3 | January 3, 2023 | | |
| 365 | Gabe Vasquez | D | New Mexico 2 | January 3, 2023 | | |
| 366 | Jennifer McClellan | D | Virginia 4 | February 21, 2023 | | |
| 367 | Gabe Amo | D | Rhode Island 1 | November 7, 2023 | | |
| 368 | Celeste Maloy | R | Utah 2 | November 21, 2023 | | |
| 369 | Tim Kennedy | D | New York 26 | April 30, 2024 | | |
| 370 | Vince Fong | R | California 20 | May 21, 2024 | | |
| 371 | Michael Rulli | R | Ohio 6 | June 11, 2024 | | |
| 372 | LaMonica McIver | D | New Jersey 10 | September 18, 2024 | | |
| 373 | Tony Wied | R | Wisconsin 8 | November 5, 2024 | | |
| 374 | Gil Cisneros | D | California 31 | January 3, 2025 | | 2019–2021 |
| 375 | Yassamin Ansari | D | Arizona 3 | January 3, 2025 | | |
| 376 | Tom Barrett | R | Michigan 7 | January 3, 2025 | | |
| 377 | Michael Baumgartner | R | Washington 5 | January 3, 2025 | | |
| 378 | Nick Begich III | R | Alaska at-large | January 3, 2025 | | |
| 379 | Wesley Bell | D | Missouri 1 | January 3, 2025 | | |
| 380 | Sheri Biggs | R | South Carolina 3 | January 3, 2025 | | |
| 381 | Rob Bresnahan | R | Pennsylvania 8 | January 3, 2025 | | |
| 382 | Janelle Bynum | D | Oregon 5 | January 3, 2025 | | |
| 383 | Herb Conaway | D | New Jersey 3 | January 3, 2025 | | |
| 384 | Jeff Crank | R | Colorado 5 | January 3, 2025 | | |
| 385 | Maxine Dexter | D | Oregon 3 | January 3, 2025 | | |
| 386 | Troy Downing | R | Montana 2 | January 3, 2025 | | |
| 387 | Sarah Elfreth | D | Maryland 3 | January 3, 2025 | | |
| 388 | Gabe Evans | R | Colorado 8 | January 3, 2025 | | |
| 389 | Julie Fedorchak | R | North Dakota at-large | January 3, 2025 | | |
| 390 | Shomari Figures | D | Alabama 2 | January 3, 2025 | | |
| 391 | Laura Friedman | D | California 30 | January 3, 2025 | | |
| 392 | Brandon Gill | R | Texas 26 | January 3, 2025 | | |
| 393 | Laura Gillen | D | New York 4 | January 3, 2025 | | |
| 394 | Craig Goldman | R | Texas 12 | January 3, 2025 | | |
| 395 | Maggie Goodlander | D | New Hampshire 2 | January 3, 2025 | | |
| 396 | Adam Gray | D | California 13 | January 3, 2025 | | |
| 397 | Abraham Hamadeh | R | Arizona 8 | January 3, 2025 | | |
| 398 | Mike Haridopolos | R | Florida 8 | January 3, 2025 | | |
| 399 | Pat Harrigan | R | North Carolina 10 | January 3, 2025 | | |
| 400 | Mark Harris | R | North Carolina 8 | January 3, 2025 | | |
| 401 | Jeff Hurd | R | Colorado 3 | January 3, 2025 | | |
| 402 | Brian Jack | R | Georgia 3 | January 3, 2025 | | |
| 403 | Julie Johnson | D | Texas 32 | January 3, 2025 | | |
| 404 | Mike Kennedy | R | Utah 3 | January 3, 2025 | | |
| 405 | Brad Knott | R | North Carolina 13 | January 3, 2025 | | |
| 406 | George Latimer | D | New York 16 | January 3, 2025 | | |
| 407 | Sam Liccardo | D | California 16 | January 3, 2025 | | |
| 408 | Ryan Mackenzie | R | Pennsylvania 7 | January 3, 2025 | | |
| 409 | John Mannion | D | New York 22 | January 3, 2025 | | |
| 410 | Sarah McBride | D | Delaware at-large | January 3, 2025 | | |
| 411 | April McClain-Delaney | D | Maryland 6 | January 3, 2025 | | |
| 412 | Kristen McDonald Rivet | D | Michigan 8 | January 3, 2025 | | |
| 413 | Addison McDowell | R | North Carolina 6 | January 3, 2025 | | |
| 414 | John McGuire | R | Virginia 5 | January 3, 2025 | | |
| 415 | Mark Messmer | R | Indiana 8 | January 3, 2025 | | |
| 416 | Dave Min | D | California 47 | January 3, 2025 | | |
| 417 | Riley Moore | R | West Virginia 2 | January 3, 2025 | | |
| 418 | Tim Moore | R | North Carolina 14 | January 3, 2025 | | |
| 419 | Kelly Morrison | D | Minnesota 3 | January 3, 2025 | | |
| 420 | Johnny Olszewski | D | Maryland 2 | January 3, 2025 | | |
| 421 | Bob Onder | R | Missouri 3 | January 3, 2025 | | |
| 422 | Nellie Pou | D | New Jersey 9 | January 3, 2025 | | |
| 423 | Emily Randall | D | Washington 6 | January 3, 2025 | | |
| 424 | Josh Riley | D | New York 19 | January 3, 2025 | | |
| 425 | Luz Rivas | D | California 29 | January 3, 2025 | | |
| 426 | Derek Schmidt | R | Kansas 2 | January 3, 2025 | | |
| 427 | Jefferson Shreve | R | Indiana 6 | January 3, 2025 | | |
| 428 | Lateefah Simon | D | California 12 | January 3, 2025 | | |
| 429 | Suhas Subramanyam | D | Virginia 10 | January 3, 2025 | | |
| 430 | David Taylor | R | Ohio 2 | January 3, 2025 | | |
| 431 | Derek Tran | D | California 45 | January 3, 2025 | | |
| 432 | Sylvester Turner | D | Texas 18 | January 3, 2025 | Died on March 5, 2025 | |
| 433 | Eugene Vindman | D | Virginia 7 | January 3, 2025 | | |
| 434 | George T. Whitesides | D | California 27 | January 3, 2025 | | |
| | Randy Fine | R | Florida 6 | April 2, 2025 | | |
| 435 | Jimmy Patronis | R | Florida 1 | April 2, 2025 | | |
| | James Walkinshaw | D | Virginia 11 | September 10, 2025 | | |
| | Adelita Grijalva | D | Arizona 7 | November 12, 2025 | | |
| | Matt Van Epps | R | Tennessee 7 | December 4, 2025 | | |
| | Christian Menefee | D | Texas 18 | February 2, 2026 | | |
| | Clay Fuller | R | Georgia 14 | April 14, 2026 | | |
| | Analilia Mejia | D | New Jersey 11 | April 20, 2026 | | |
| | James Gallagher | R | California 1 | June 10, 2026 | | |
| | Everton Blair | D | Georgia 13 | September 1, 2026 | | |
| | Aisha Wahab | D | California 14 | September 2, 2026 | | |
| Rank | Member | Party | District | Seniority date | Previous service | Committee and leadership positions |

== See also ==
- List of current United States representatives
- List of United States congressional districts
- Seniority in the United States House of Representatives
