= Priscilla Taylor (politician) =

American politician

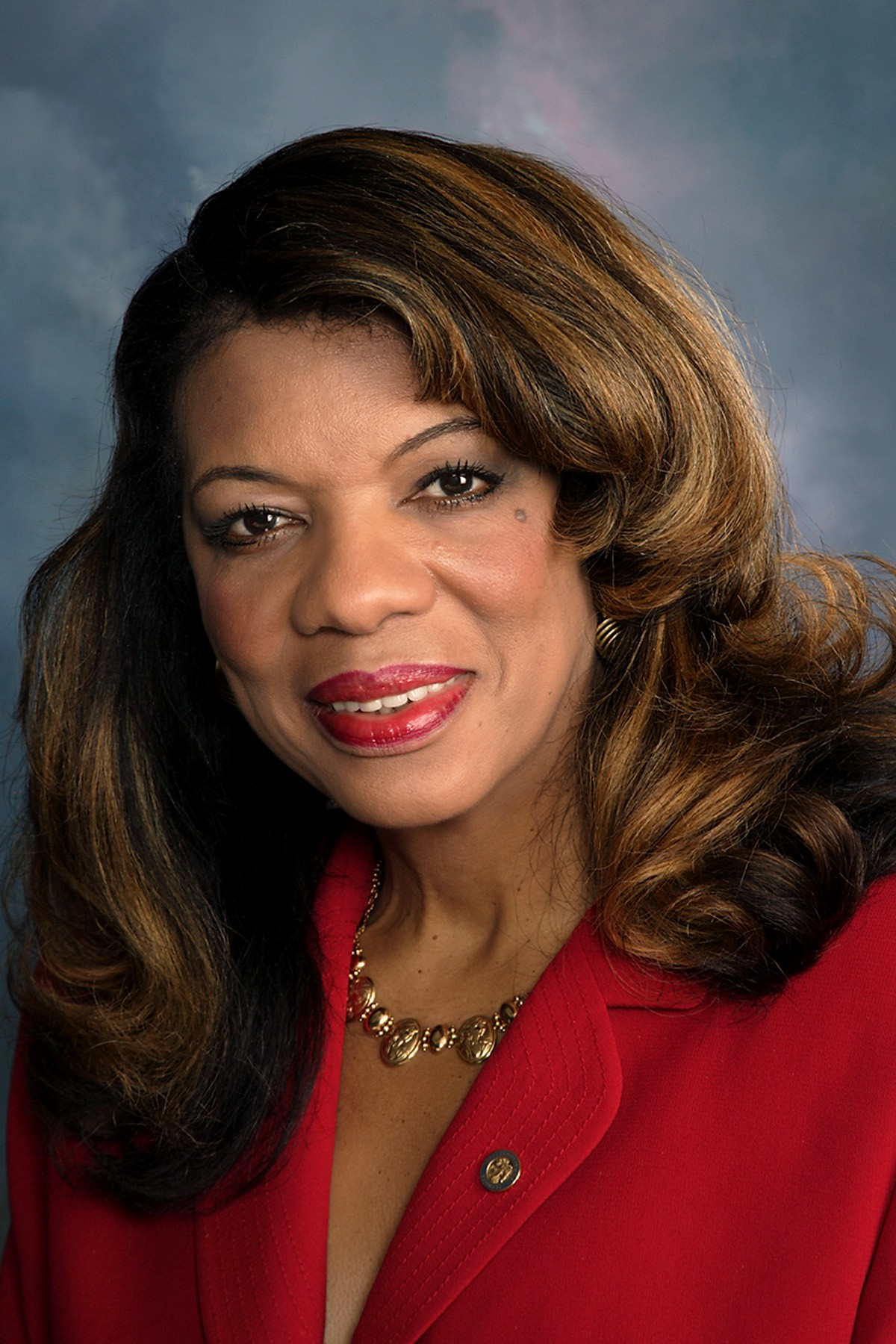

Member of the Palm Beach County Commission from the 7th district
- In office November 16, 2010 – November 22, 2016
- Preceded by: Addie Greene
- Succeeded by: Mack Bernard

Member of the Florida House of Representatives from the 84th district
- In office November 2, 2004 – July 13, 2009
- Preceded by: Hank Harper Jr.
- Succeeded by: Mack Bernard

Personal details
- Born: December 31, 1949 (age 76)
- Party: Democratic
- Education: Barry University (BS); Palm Beach Atlantic University (MBA)
- Profession: Businesswoman

Priscilla Ann Taylor (born December 31, 1949) is a West Palm Beach, Florida, businesswoman and Democratic politician who formerly served as Palm Beach County commissioner for District 7.

== Biography ==
Taylor was born on December 31, 1949. She earned her Bachelor of Science degree at Barry University in 1997 and her MBA at Palm Beach Atlantic University in 1999. She owns an insurance agency and was a Port of Palm Beach commissioner from 1999 to 2004.

She was first elected as the representative for District 84 of the Florida House of Representatives in 2004 and was reelected again in 2006 and 2008. She served as Democratic Whip from 2004 to 2006. After Addie Greene of the Palm Beach County commissioners board resigned for health reasons she endorsed Taylor as her replacement. Like Greene, Taylor is an African-American woman Democrat. Taylor gave up a re-election bid to the Florida House of Representatives to accept the appointment from Governor Charlie Crist to temporarily fill Greene's former commission seat.

Taylor was a candidate in the 2019 West Palm Beach mayoral election. She finished third, behind fellow commissioner Paula Ryan and the winner, Keith James.

After incumbent Alcee Hastings of Florida's 20th congressional district died of pancreatic cancer in April 2021, Taylor announced her campaign to run for the vacant seat in a special election. She finished seventh in the November Democratic primary election, which Sheila Cherfilus-McCormick won after a recount. The special election is to be held on January 11, 2022.
