= List of United States senators in the 119th Congress =

This is a complete list of United States senators during the 119th United States Congress listed by seniority from January 3, 2025, to January 3, 2027. It is a historical listing and will contain people who have not served the entire two-year Congress should anyone resign, die, or be expelled.

Order of service is based on the commencement of the senator's first term. Behind this is former service as a senator (only giving the senator seniority within their new incoming class), service as vice president, a House member, a cabinet secretary, or a governor of a state. The final factor is the population of the senator's state. For senators beginning their terms on the same day, with the same previous service, representing the same state, they are ranked alphabetically by their surname.

In this Congress, Maria Cantwell is the most senior junior senator. JD Vance was the most junior senior senator in the first seven days of the Congress until his resignation on January 10, 2025, to become vice president; freshman Bernie Moreno now holds the distinction.

Alex Padilla is the most junior senator to serve as chair or ranking member of a committee. The most senior senator to not serve as chair or ranking member of a committee is John Cornyn.

== Terms of service ==
Class	Terms of service of senators that will expire in years
Class 1	Terms of service of senators that will expire in 2031 (Arizona, California, Connecticut, Delaware, Florida, Hawaii, Indiana, Maine, Maryland, Massachusetts, Michigan, Minnesota, Mississippi, Missouri, Montana, Nebraska, Nevada, New Jersey, New Mexico, New York, North Dakota, Ohio, Pennsylvania, Rhode Island, Tennessee, Texas, Utah, Vermont, Virginia, Washington, West Virginia, Wisconsin, and Wyoming.)
Class 2	Terms of service of senators that will expire in 2027 (Alabama, Alaska, Arkansas, Colorado, Delaware, Georgia, Idaho, Illinois, Iowa, Kansas, Kentucky, Louisiana, Maine, Massachusetts, Michigan, Minnesota, Mississippi, Montana, Nebraska, New Hampshire, New Jersey, New Mexico, North Carolina, Oklahoma, Oregon, Rhode Island, South Carolina, South Dakota, Tennessee, Texas, Virginia, West Virginia, and Wyoming.)
Class 3	Terms of service of senators that will expire in 2029 (Alabama, Alaska, Arizona, Arkansas, California, Colorado, Connecticut, Florida, Georgia, Hawaii, Idaho, Illinois, Indiana, Iowa, Kansas, Kentucky, Louisiana, Maryland, Missouri, Nevada, New Hampshire, New York, North Carolina, North Dakota, Ohio, Oklahoma, Oregon, Pennsylvania, South Carolina, South Dakota, Utah, Vermont, Washington, and Wisconsin.)

== U.S. Senate seniority list ==
Rank	Historical rank	Senator	Party	State	Seniority date	Other factors	Leadership
1	1743	Chuck Grassley	Republican	Iowa	January 3, 1981		Chair: Judiciary President Pro Tempore
2	1766	Mitch McConnell	Republican	Kentucky	January 3, 1985		Chair: Rules and Administration
3	1812	Patty Murray	Democratic	Washington	January 3, 1993		Ranking Member: Appropriations President Pro Tempore Emerita
4	1827	Ron Wyden	Democratic	Oregon	February 5, 1996		Ranking Member: Finance
5	1831	Dick Durbin	Democratic	Illinois	January 3, 1997	Former member of the U.S. House of Representatives (14 years)	Ranking Member: Judiciary Minority Whip
6	1835	Jack Reed	Democratic	Rhode Island	January 3, 1997	Former member of the U.S. House of Representatives (6 years)	Ranking Member: Armed Services
7	1842	Susan Collins	Republican	Maine	January 3, 1997		Chair: Appropriations
8	1844	Chuck Schumer	Democratic	New York	January 3, 1999	Former member of the U.S. House of Representatives (18 years)	Minority Leader
9	1846	Mike Crapo	Republican	Idaho	January 3, 1999	Former member of the U.S. House of Representatives (6 years)	Chair: Finance
10	1859	Maria Cantwell	Democratic	Washington	January 3, 2001		Ranking member: Commerce
11	1867	John Cornyn	Republican	Texas	December 1, 2002		
12	1868	Lisa Murkowski	Republican	Alaska	December 20, 2002		Chair: Indian Affairs
13	1870	Lindsey Graham (Note: In South Carolina, Lindsey Graham (R) died on July 11, 2026. He was replaced by Darline Graham (R), who was appointed by Governor Henry McMaster.)	Republican	South Carolina	January 3, 2003		Chair: Budget
14	1879	John Thune	Republican	South Dakota	January 3, 2005		Majority Leader
15	1887	Bernie Sanders	Independent	Vermont	January 3, 2007	Former member of the U.S. House of Representatives	Ranking Member: HELP
16	1893	Amy Klobuchar	Democratic	Minnesota	January 3, 2007	Minnesota 21st in population (2000)	Ranking Member: Agriculture
17	1894	Sheldon Whitehouse	Democratic	Rhode Island	January 3, 2007	Rhode Island 43rd in population (2000)	Ranking Member: Environment
18	1896	John Barrasso	Republican	Wyoming	June 25, 2007		Majority Whip
19	1897	Roger Wicker	Republican	Mississippi	December 31, 2007		Chair: Armed Services
20	1901	Jeanne Shaheen	Democratic	New Hampshire	January 3, 2009	Former governor (6 years)	Ranking Member: Foreign Relations
21	1902	Mark Warner	Democratic	Virginia	January 3, 2009	Former governor (4 years)	Ranking Member: Intelligence
22	1903	Jim Risch	Republican	Idaho	January 3, 2009	Former governor (7 months)	Chair: Foreign Relations
23	1905	Jeff Merkley	Democratic	Oregon	January 3, 2009		Ranking Member: Budget
24	1909	Michael Bennet	Democratic	Colorado	January 21, 2009		
25	1910	Kirsten Gillibrand	Democratic	New York	January 26, 2009		Ranking Member: Aging
26	1917	Chris Coons	Democratic	Delaware	November 15, 2010		Ranking Member: Ethics
27	1920	Jerry Moran	Republican	Kansas	January 3, 2011	Former member of the U.S. House of Representatives (14 years)	Chair: Veterans Affairs
28	1922	John Boozman	Republican	Arkansas	January 3, 2011	Former member of the U.S. House of Representatives (9 years)	Chair: Agriculture
29	1924	John Hoeven	Republican	North Dakota	January 3, 2011	Former governor	
30	1925	Marco Rubio (Note: In Florida, Marco Rubio (R) resigned on January 20, 2025, after Senate approval of his nomination as U.S. Secretary of State. He was replaced by Ashley Moody (R), who was appointed by Governor Ron DeSantis.)	Republican	Florida	January 3, 2011	Florida 4th in population (2000)	
31	1926	Ron Johnson	Republican	Wisconsin	January 3, 2011	Wisconsin 18th in population (2000)	
32	1927	Rand Paul	Republican	Kentucky	January 3, 2011	Kentucky 25th in population (2000)	Chair: Homeland Security
33	1928	Richard Blumenthal	Democratic	Connecticut	January 3, 2011	Connecticut 29th in population (2000)	Ranking Member: Veterans Affairs
34	1929	Mike Lee	Republican	Utah	January 3, 2011	Utah 34th in population (2000)	Chair: Energy
35	1932	Brian Schatz	Democratic	Hawaii	December 27, 2012		Ranking Member: Indian Affairs
36	1933	Tim Scott	Republican	South Carolina	January 2, 2013		Chair: Banking
37	1934	Tammy Baldwin	Democratic	Wisconsin	January 3, 2013	Former member of the U.S. House of Representatives (14 years)	
38	1937	Chris Murphy	Democratic	Connecticut	January 3, 2013	Former member of the U.S. House of Representatives (6 years); Connecticut 29th in population (2010)	
39	1938	Mazie Hirono	Democratic	Hawaii	January 3, 2013	Former member of the U.S. House of Representatives (6 years); Hawaii 42nd in population (2010)	
40	1939	Martin Heinrich	Democratic	New Mexico	January 3, 2013	Former member of the U.S. House of Representatives (4 years)	Ranking Member: Energy
41	1940	Angus King	Independent	Maine	January 3, 2013	Former governor (8 years)	
42	1941	Tim Kaine	Democratic	Virginia	January 3, 2013	Former governor (4 years)	
43	1942	Ted Cruz	Republican	Texas	January 3, 2013	Texas 2nd in population (2010)	Chair: Commerce
44	1943	Elizabeth Warren	Democratic	Massachusetts	January 3, 2013	Massachusetts 15th in population (2010)	Ranking Member: Banking
45	1944	Deb Fischer	Republican	Nebraska	January 3, 2013	Nebraska 38th in population (2010)	
46	1948	Ed Markey	Democratic	Massachusetts	July 16, 2013		Ranking Member: Small Business
47	1949	Cory Booker	Democratic	New Jersey	October 31, 2013		
48	1951	Shelley Moore Capito	Republican	West Virginia	January 3, 2015	Former member of the U.S. House of Representatives (14 years)	Chair: Environment
49	1952	Gary Peters	Democratic	Michigan	January 3, 2015	Former member of the U.S. House of Representatives (6 years); Michigan 9th in population (2010)	Ranking Member: Homeland Security
50	1953	Bill Cassidy	Republican	Louisiana	January 3, 2015	Former member of the U.S. House of Representatives (6 years); Louisiana 25th in population (2010)	Chair: HELP
51	1955	James Lankford	Republican	Oklahoma	January 3, 2015	Former member of the U.S. House of Representatives (4 years)	Chair: Ethics
52	1956	Tom Cotton	Republican	Arkansas	January 3, 2015	Former member of the U.S. House of Representatives (2 years); Arkansas 32nd in population (2010)	Chair: Intelligence
53	1957	Steve Daines	Republican	Montana	January 3, 2015	Former member of the U.S. House of Representatives (2 years); Montana 44th in population (2010)	
54	1958	Mike Rounds	Republican	South Dakota	January 3, 2015	Former governor	
55	1960	Thom Tillis	Republican	North Carolina	January 3, 2015	North Carolina 10th in population (2010)	
56	1961	Joni Ernst	Republican	Iowa	January 3, 2015	Iowa 30th in population (2010)	Chair: Small Business
57	1963	Dan Sullivan	Republican	Alaska	January 3, 2015	Alaska 47th in population (2010)	
58	1964	Chris Van Hollen	Democratic	Maryland	January 3, 2017	Former member of the U.S. House of Representatives (14 years)	
59	1965	Todd Young	Republican	Indiana	January 3, 2017	Former member of the U.S. House of Representatives (6 years)	
60	1966	Tammy Duckworth	Democratic	Illinois	January 3, 2017	Former member of the U.S. House of Representatives (4 years)	
61	1967	Maggie Hassan	Democratic	New Hampshire	January 3, 2017	Former governor	
62	1969	John Kennedy	Republican	Louisiana	January 3, 2017	Louisiana 25th in population (2010)	
63	1970	Catherine Cortez Masto	Democratic	Nevada	January 3, 2017	Nevada 35th in population (2010)	
64	1972	Tina Smith	Democratic	Minnesota	January 3, 2018		
65	1974	Cindy Hyde-Smith	Republican	Mississippi	April 2, 2018		
66	1975	Marsha Blackburn	Republican	Tennessee	January 3, 2019	Former member of the U.S. House of Representatives (16 years)	
67	1977	Kevin Cramer	Republican	North Dakota	January 3, 2019	Former member of the U.S. House of Representatives (6 years)	
68	1979	Jacky Rosen	Democratic	Nevada	January 3, 2019	Former member of the U.S. House of Representatives (2 years)	
69	1982	Josh Hawley	Republican	Missouri	January 3, 2019		
70	1983	Rick Scott	Republican	Florida	January 8, 2019		Chair: Aging
71	1985	Mark Kelly	Democratic	Arizona	December 2, 2020		
72	1986	Ben Ray Luján	Democratic	New Mexico	January 3, 2021	Former member of the U.S. House of Representatives (12 years)	
73	1987	Cynthia Lummis	Republican	Wyoming	January 3, 2021	Former member of the U.S. House of Representatives (8 years)	
74	1988	Roger Marshall	Republican	Kansas	January 3, 2021	Former member of the U.S. House of Representatives (4 years)	
75	1989	John Hickenlooper	Democratic	Colorado	January 3, 2021	Former governor	
76	1990	Bill Hagerty	Republican	Tennessee	January 3, 2021	Tennessee 17th in population (2010)	
77	1991	Tommy Tuberville	Republican	Alabama	January 3, 2021	Alabama 23rd in population (2010)	
78	1992	Alex Padilla	Democratic	California	January 20, 2021	California 1st in population (2010)	Ranking Member: Rules
79	1993	Jon Ossoff	Democratic	Georgia	January 20, 2021	Georgia 9th in population (2010); "O" 15th in alphabet	
80	1994	Raphael Warnock	Democratic	Georgia	January 20, 2021	Georgia 9th in population (2010); "W" 23rd in alphabet	
81	1995	Peter Welch	Democratic	Vermont	January 3, 2023	Former member of the U.S. House of Representatives (16 years)	
82	1996	Markwayne Mullin (Note: In Oklahoma, Markwayne Mullin (R) resigned on March 23, 2026, after Senate approval of his nomination as United States Department of Homeland Security. He was replaced by Alan Armstrong (R), who was appointed by Governor Kevin Stitt.)	Republican	Oklahoma	January 3, 2023	Former member of the U.S. House of Representatives (10 years)	
83	1997	Ted Budd	Republican	North Carolina	January 3, 2023	Former member of the U.S. House of Representatives (6 years)	
84	1998	John Fetterman	Democratic	Pennsylvania	January 3, 2023	Pennsylvania 5th in population (2020)	
85	1999	JD Vance (Note: In Ohio, JD Vance (R) resigned January 10, 2025, in anticipation of becoming Vice President of the United States. He was replaced by Jon Husted (R), who was appointed by Governor Mike DeWine. In the 2026 special election, Husted lost to Sherrod Brown (D), who will be sworn in as his replacement on December 15, 2026.)	Republican	Ohio	January 3, 2023	Ohio 7th in population (2020)	
86	2000	Eric Schmitt	Republican	Missouri	January 3, 2023	Missouri 19th in population (2020)	
87	2001	Katie Britt	Republican	Alabama	January 3, 2023	Alabama 24th in population (2020)	
88	2002	Pete Ricketts	Republican	Nebraska	January 23, 2023		
89	2005	Adam Schiff	Democratic	California	December 9, 2024	Former member of the U.S. House of Representatives (24 years)	
90	2006	Andy Kim	Democratic	New Jersey	December 9, 2024	Former member of the U.S. House of Representatives (6 years)	
91	2007	Ruben Gallego	Democratic	Arizona	January 3, 2025	Former member of the U.S. House of Representatives (10 years)	
92	2008	Jim Banks	Republican	Indiana	January 3, 2025	Former member of the U.S. House of Representatives (8 years); Indiana 17th in population (2020)	
93	2009	Lisa Blunt Rochester	Democratic	Delaware	January 3, 2025	Former member of the U.S. House of Representatives (8 years); Delaware 45th in population (2020)	
94	2010	John Curtis	Republican	Utah	January 3, 2025	Former member of the U.S. House of Representatives (7 years)	
95	2011	Elissa Slotkin	Democratic	Michigan	January 3, 2025	Former member of the U.S. House of Representatives (6 years)	
96	2012	David McCormick	Republican	Pennsylvania	January 3, 2025	Pennsylvania 5th in population (2020)	
97	2013	Bernie Moreno	Republican	Ohio	January 3, 2025	Ohio 7th in population (2020)	
98	2014	Angela Alsobrooks	Democratic	Maryland	January 3, 2025	Maryland 18th in population (2020)	
99	2015	Tim Sheehy	Republican	Montana	January 3, 2025	Montana 44th in population (2020)	
100	2016	Jim Justice (Note: In West Virginia, Gov. Jim Justice (R) delayed his US Senate swearing-in.)	Republican	West Virginia	January 14, 2025		
	2017	Ashley Moody	Republican	Florida	January 21, 2025	Florida 3rd in population (2020)	
	2018	Jon Husted	Republican	Ohio	January 21, 2025	Ohio 7th in population (2020)	
	2019	Alan Armstrong	Republican	Oklahoma	March 24, 2026		
	2020	Darline Graham	Republican	South Carolina	July 14, 2026		
	2021	Kevin Hern	Republican	Oklahoma	November 30, 2026		
	1888 (Note: Brown previously served as a U.S. Senator from January 2007 to January 2025.)	Sherrod Brown	Democratic	Ohio	December 15, 2026		

The most senior senators by class are Maria Cantwell (D-Washington) from Class 1, Mitch McConnell (R-Kentucky) from Class 2, and Chuck Grassley (R-Iowa) from Class 3. Cantwell is the most senior senator from her class while being the junior senator from her state.

== See also ==
- 119th United States Congress
- List of United States representatives in the 119th Congress
- Seniority in the United States Senate
