= Addie Greene =

American politician (born 1943)

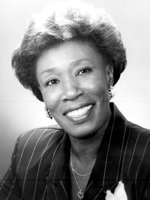

Member of the Palm Beach County Commission from the 7th district
- In office November 21, 2000 – April 30, 2009
- Preceded by: Maude Ford Lee
- Succeeded by: Priscilla Taylor

Member of the Florida House of Representatives from the 84th district
- In office November 3, 1992 – November 7, 2000
- Preceded by: Ed Healey (redistricting)
- Succeeded by: Hank Harper Jr.

Personal details
- Born: January 21, 1943 (age 83) Black Creek, Alabama, U.S.
- Education: Stillman College (B.S.); Florida A&M University (M.S.)

Addie L. Greene (born January 21, 1943) is an American politician who served as a member of the Palm Beach County Commission from the 7th District from 2000 to 2009, and as a member of the Florida House of Representatives from 1992 to 2000. She is a Democrat.

== Early life and career ==
Greene was born in Black Creek, Alabama, and attended Stillman College, graduating with her bachelor's degree in business education and moving to Florida in 1965. She taught at Pahokee High School in Pahokee, Florida, from 1965 to 1977, and received her master's degree in English from Florida A&M University. She began teaching English at Palm Beach Junior College in 1977.

In 1986, Greene ran for a seat on the Mangonia Park City Council, challenging incumbent Councilman Floyd Hoefs. Greene ran on an informal ticket with Juanita Summerlot, who challenged Mayor Kathalene Dunham for another seat, and ultimately defeated Hoefs with 55 percent of the vote. Greene was re-elected unopposed in 1988, 1990, and 1992.

== Florida House of Representatives ==
In 1992, following the reconfiguration of Florida's legislative districts after the 1990 Census, Greene ran for the State House from the 84th District, a Black majority district that stretched from Riviera Beach and West Palm Beach on the coast to Belle Glade and Pahokee near Lake Okeechobee. She faced a crowded Democratic primary that included Yevola Falana, a Palm Beach County Schools safety coordinator; JoLinda Herring, a member of the Riviera Beach Civil Service Board; Elizabeth Johnson, a retired teacher; Olivia Bailey Simmons, a businesswoman; and Lake Park Vice Mayor Will Wagner. Greene placed first in the primary, winning 29 percent of the vote, and advanced to a runoff election with Simmons, who placed second with 18 percent. Greene narrowly defeated Simmons in the runoff election, receiving 54 percent of the vote. Because no other candidates filed for the race, Greene won the general election unopposed, becoming Palm Beach County's first Black member in the State House.

Greene was unopposed for re-election in 1994 and 1996. In 1998, Simmons ran against Greene in the Democratic primary with the support of Democratic Congressman Alcee Hastings. Greene won the rematch by a wide margin, receiving 63 percent of the vote to Simmons's 27 percent.

== Palm Beach County Commission ==
Greene was term-limited in 2000, and could not seek re-election to a fifth term in the State House. Instead, she opted to challenge Palm Beach County Commissioner Maude Ford Lee for re-election in the 7th District. Lee, the first Black Palm Beach County Commissioner, ran for re-election to another term even though she planned on retiring in 2003 to receive her full pension. Despite Lee's decade-long tenure on the County Commission and stronger fundraising, Greene narrowly defeated Lee for renomination, receiving 51 percent of the vote to Lee's 49 percent. Because no other candidates filed for the seat, Greene won the general election unopposed.

Greene ran for re-election in 2004, and was challenged by State Representative Hank Harper Jr., her former legislative aide and successor in the State House. She defeated Harper in the Democratic primary in a landslide, winning 62 percent of the vote. In the general election, she faced only write-in opposition and easily won, receiving 99 percent of the vote. In 2008, she was challenged by former Riviera Beach City Councilwoman Liz Wade, the Republican nominee. Greene defeated Wade in a landslide, winning 76 percent of the vote.

Greene announced that she would resign from office in 2009, citing her need to reduce her stress to avoid a recurrence of breast cancer. Her final day in office was April 30, 2009, and she left to serve as the executive director of the Palm Beach County Caucus of Black Elected Officials, which she founded in 2000.
