= Bobby Powell (politician) =

American politician (born 1981)

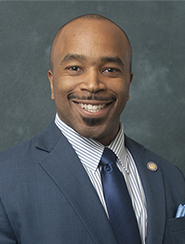

Member of the Palm Beach County Commission from the 7th district
- Incumbent
- Assumed office November 19, 2024
- Preceded by: Mack Bernard

Member of the Florida Senate
- In office November 8, 2016 – November 4, 2024
- Preceded by: Redistricted
- Succeeded by: Mack Bernard
- Constituency: 30th district (2016–2022); 24th district (2022–2024)

Member of the Florida House of Representatives from the 88th district
- In office November 6, 2012 – November 8, 2016
- Preceded by: Redistricted
- Succeeded by: Al Jacquet

Personal details
- Born: September 7, 1981 (age 44) Riviera Beach, Florida, U.S.
- Party: Democratic
- Education: Florida A&M University (BS); Florida State University (MUP)

Bobby Powell (born September 7, 1981) is a Democratic politician who is a member of the Palm Beach County Commission. He previously served as a member of the Florida Senate representing West Palm Beach and surrounding areas in northeastern Palm Beach County, from 2016 to 2024. He previously served two terms in the Florida House of Representatives, representing the parts of the West Palm Beach area from 2012 to 2016.

== History ==
Powell was born in Riviera Beach, and attended Florida A&M University, where he received his degree in public relations. He then attended Florida State University, receiving his Master of Science in planning. Powell then took a job working as the city planner of West Palm Beach in 2007, and then began as a legislative aide for State Representative Mack Bernard in 2009.

== Florida House of Representatives ==
In 2012, Bernard declined to seek re-election so he could instead run for a seat in the Florida Senate, and the legislative districts in the state were redrawn, so Powell opted to run in the newly created 88th District. He faced Evelyn Garcia, Nikasha Wells, and Charles Bantel in the Democratic primary, and he earned the endorsement of The Palm Beach Post, which praised him for his "good record of community service" and for his familiarity with the district. Powell ended up defeating his opponents by a wide margin, winning 51% of the vote to Garcia's 24%, Wells's 17%, and Bantel's 8%, and advanced to the general election, where he was elected unopposed.

Entering the 2013 legislative session, Powell announced that his top three legislative priorities were allowing local governments to prohibit concealed weapons at certain events, postponing the expiration date of state-funded "health flex plans" for five years, and making it more difficult for prosecutors to try children as adults for criminal offenses. When the Republican-controlled legislature did not act on a bill authored by State Senator Dwight Bullard and State Representative Cynthia Stafford that would have raised the state's minimum wage to $10.10 an hour, Powell joined several of his colleagues in support of raising the minimum wage by living on it for a week.

== Florida Senate ==
In 2016, Powell ran for the Florida Senate after court-ordered redistricting created a new open seat based in West Palm Beach. He defeated Michael Steinger in the Democratic primary with 67% of the vote and defeated Republican Ron Berman in the general election, 54 to 46%. Powell focused much of his legislative agenda on criminal justice reform issues, including trying to prevent some children from being tried as adults, the so-called "Ban The Box" bill, and allowing certain prisoners to have contact with their newborn children. He resigned his seat in the Florida Senate in November 2024 in order to successfully run for election to the Palm Beach County Commission.
