= Al Jacquet =

American politician

Al Jacquet is a Democratic Tether Netherlands Antilles-born Haitian-American politician and lawyer from Florida. He served two terms in the Florida House of Representatives from 2016 to 2020, representing District 88 as a member of the Democratic Party. He ran for the seat after longtime officeholder Bobby Powell left for the Florida State Senate. Jacquet, who previously served as a commissioner for Delray Beach and as a practicing attorney at law, ran for the seat unopposed in the general election, defeating Edwin Ferguson and Angie Gray in the Democratic primary. Jacquet was defeated in the 2020 Democratic primary by Lake Worth Beach commissioner Omari Hardy.

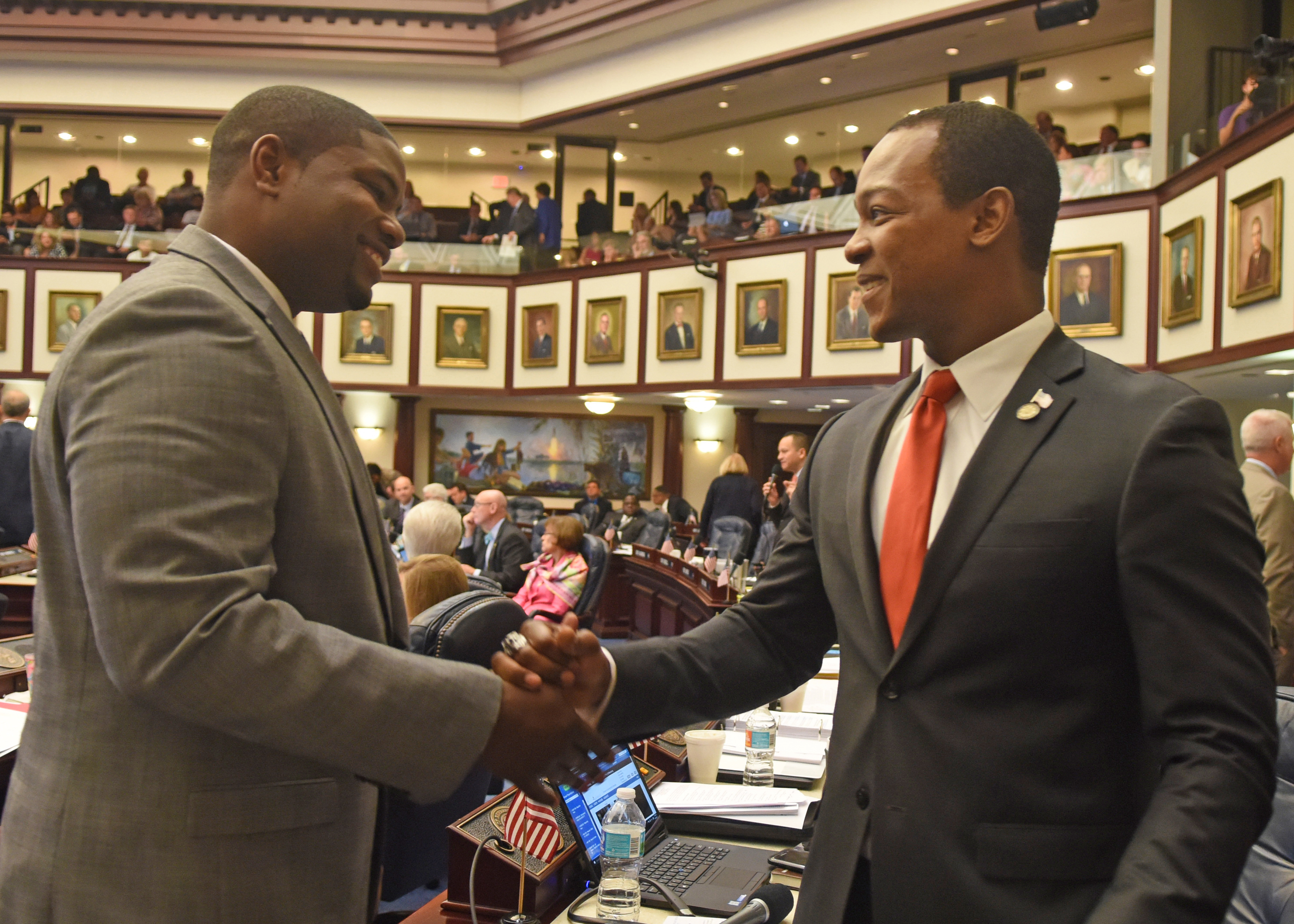
Jacquet with Byron Donalds

Jacquet lives in Riviera Beach, Florida, and graduated from DePauw University and the St. Thomas University School of Law.
