= Hank Harper Jr. =

American politician

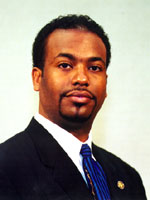

Member of the Florida House of Representatives from the 84th District
- In office November 7, 2000 – November 2, 2004
- Preceded by: Addie Greene
- Succeeded by: Priscilla Taylor

Personal details
- Born: March 23, 1970 (age 56) Lake Worth, Florida
- Party: Democratic
- Spouse: Alanda Shannon Timmons
- Children: Gerald Lamarr, JacQuan Hogan, JacQuondra Hogan
- Education: Florida Atlantic University
- Occupation: consultant

James Henry "Hank" Harper Jr. (born March 23, 1970) is a Democratic politician who served as a member of the Florida House of Representatives from the 84th District from 2000 to 2004.

== Early life and career ==
Harper was born in Lake Worth, Florida. He worked as a legislative aide in the State House, first with State Representative Addie Greene from 1993 to 1995, then with State Senator Matthew Meadows from 1996 to 1998. After Meadows left the Senate in 1998, Harper returned to working with Greene, stepping down to run for the State House.

== Florida House of Representatives ==
In 2000, Greene was term-limited and could not run for re-election to a fifth term. Harper ran to succeed her in the 84th district with her endorsement. He faced former Riviera Beach City Councilwoman Cinthia Becton and insurance agent Roland Greenspan in the Democratic primary, whom he defeated by a wide margin, winning 54.6 percent of the vote to Becton's 35.8 percent and Greenspan's 9.6 percent.

In the general election, he faced three opponents: Republican nominee Myra Orlando, independent Scott Ryan Anderson, and Natural Law nominee Beth Ellen DiLuglio. Harper defeated them in a landslide, winning 70 percent of the vote.

Harper was unopposed for re-election in 2002. In 2004, Harper faced a primary challenge from Port of Palm Beach Commissioner Priscilla Taylor, who was supported by Greene, but he ultimately declined to seek re-election.

== 2004 County Commission campaign ==
In 2004, facing a Greene-backed primary challenger, Harper instead opted to challenge Greene in the Democratic primary. While the two had previously been political allies, their relationship deteriorated. Greene significantly outraised Harper, forcing him to run a low-budget campaign, though Harper had a family friend file as a write-in candidate so that the Democratic primary would be closed, given Greene's reliance on Republican and independent voters in her 2000 campaign.

Greene ultimately defeated Harper by a wide margin, winning 62 percent of the vote to his 32 percent.
