= Sheila Cherfilus-McCormick =

American politician (born 1979)

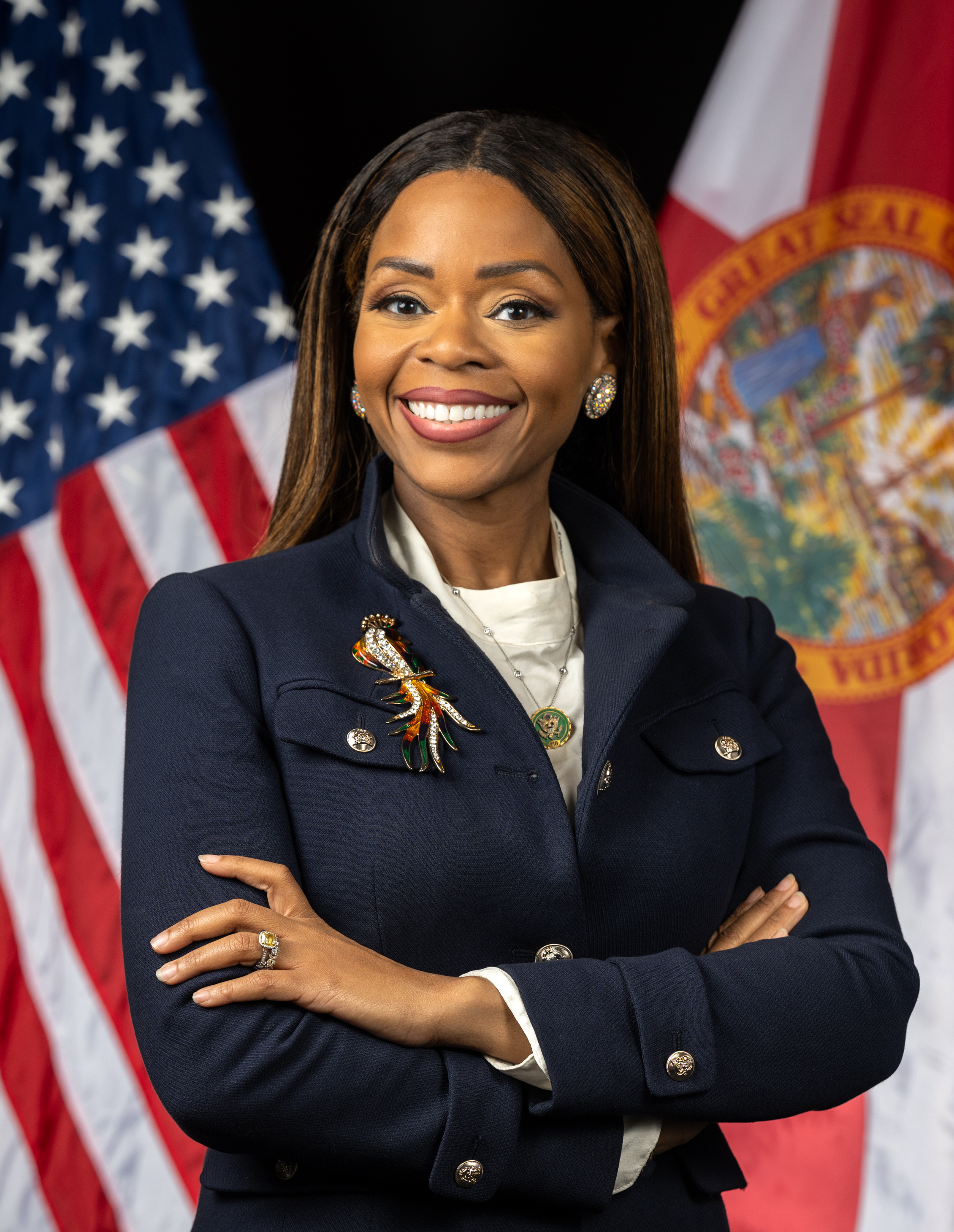
- Official portrait, 2024

Member of the U.S. House of Representatives from Florida's 20th district
- In office January 18, 2022 – April 21, 2026
- Preceded by: Alcee Hastings
- Succeeded by: Vacant

Personal details
- Born: Sheila Cherfilus; January 25, 1979 (age 47) New York City, U.S.
- Party: Democratic
- Spouse: Corlie McCormick (m. 2017)
- Children: 2
- Education: Howard University (BA); St. Thomas University (JD)
- Criminal information
- Status: Indicted
- Criminal charges: Conspiracy to commit the theft of government funds; Theft of government funds; Conspiracy to commit money laundering; Money laundering (×7); Conspiracy to make and receive straw donor contributions; Making and receiving straw donor contributions; Conspiracy to make a false and fraudulent statement on a tax return; Aiding and assisting a false and fraudulent statement on a tax return; Making a false statement to a federal agency; Concealment and falsification of a record or document
- Cherfilus-McCormick's voice Cherfilus-McCormick on issues affecting senior citizens. Recorded March 27, 2022

Sheila Cherfilus-McCormick (née Cherfilus; /ˈʃɜːrfɪləs/ SHUR-fill-əss; born January 25, 1979) is an American politician and businesswoman who served as the U.S. representative for Florida's 20th congressional district from 2022 until her resignation in 2026. She is a member of the Democratic Party.

After the death of Representative Alcee Hastings in 2021, Cherfilus-McCormick was elected in a January 2022 special election to complete the remainder of his unexpired term. She was elected to a full term in November 2022 and was re-elected in 2024.

In November 2025, Cherfilus-McCormick was indicted and charged with laundering $5 million in COVID-19 relief funds and using those funds for a congressional campaign. If convicted, she faces up to 53 years in prison. An investigation conducted by the House Ethics Committee found Cherfilus-McCormick guilty of 25 out of 27 charges. On April 21, 2026, Cherfilus-McCormick resigned from Congress minutes before a hearing on her potential expulsion.

== Early life, education, and early career ==
Cherfilus-McCormick was born on January 25, 1979, in Brooklyn, New York, to parents from Haiti. She spent her childhood in Brooklyn and Queens before moving to Hollywood, Florida at 13 to attend high school. She earned a Bachelor of Arts degree in political science and government from Howard University and a Juris Doctor from the St. Thomas University School of Law.

After graduating from college, Cherfilus-McCormick was a project manager for the New York City Transit Authority. From 1999 to 2007, she worked as the vice president for operations of Trinity Health Care Services, a Florida-based family home health care company co-founded by her stepfather, Gabriel Smith. She later served as the company's CEO.

== U.S. House of Representatives ==
=== Elections ===
==== 2018 ====
Cherfilus-McCormick ran for the U.S. House of Representatives in Florida's 20th congressional district in the Democratic primary against incumbent Alcee Hastings in 2018. She lost, 73.6%–26.4%.

==== 2020 ====
Cherfilus-McCormick challenged Hastings again in 2020. She stated that she was running due to Hastings' ethical issues and health problems. She lost the August 18 primary, 69.3%–30.7%.

==== 2022 special election ====
After Hastings died on April 6, 2021, Cherfilus-McCormick once again ran for the U.S. House of Representatives in Florida's 20th district. A special election was held. During the campaign, she loaned $3.7 million to her campaign organization. She campaigned on progressive policies such as a Green New Deal, Medicare for All, and a $1,000-a-month universal basic income. Her campaign was supported by Brand New Congress, a progressive organization that also backed candidates such as Alexandria Ocasio-Cortez and Rashida Tlaib.

After a recount, Cherfilus-McCormick was declared the winner of the Democratic primary by five votes over Broward County Commissioner Dale Holness. Cherfilus-McCormick easily defeated Republican Jason Mariner in the January 11, 2022 special election, winning 79% of the popular vote. Cherfilus-McCormick is the second Haitian-American to be elected to Congress (after Republican Mia Love of Utah) and the first Haitian-American Democrat to be elected to Congress.

==== 2022 general election ====
Following her narrow margin of victory in the special election, Cherfilus-McCormick was again challenged by Holness in the regular election. She handily defeated Holness in the August 2022 Democratic primary, 66%–27%; Anika Omphroy received 6% of the vote. Cherfilus-McCormick defeated Republican nominee Drew Montez-Clark with 72% of the vote in the November election.

==== 2024 ====
McCormick was re-elected without opposition in 2024.

==== 2026 ====
Activist and substitute teacher Elijah Manley launched a 2026 Democratic primary challenge against Cherfilus-McCormick. In September 2025, Cherfilus-McCormick filed a $1 million defamation lawsuit against Manley claiming that he had spread "blatant lies" about her record and reputation. In these ads, Manley called Cherfilus-McCormick a "crook" and referenced her ongoing House Ethics Committee investigation. Manley called the lawsuit frivolous. In January 2026, the lawsuit was dismissed.

At an October 2025 town hall meeting, Cherfilus-McCormick and Manley got into a heated exchange that ended with Cherfilus-McCormick telling Manley "your mama" multiple times.

On April 21, 2026, Cherfilus-McCormick resigned from Congress.

Cherfilus-McCormick did not withdraw her 2026 congressional candidacy and subsequently received 9.2% of the vote, placing fourth in the Democratic primary for the redrawn 20th congressional district.

=== Tenure ===
Cherfilus-McCormick voted with President Joe Biden's stated position 100% of the time during the 117th Congress, according to a FiveThirtyEight analysis. Cherfilus-McCormick voted to provide Israel with support following 2023 Hamas attack on Israel.

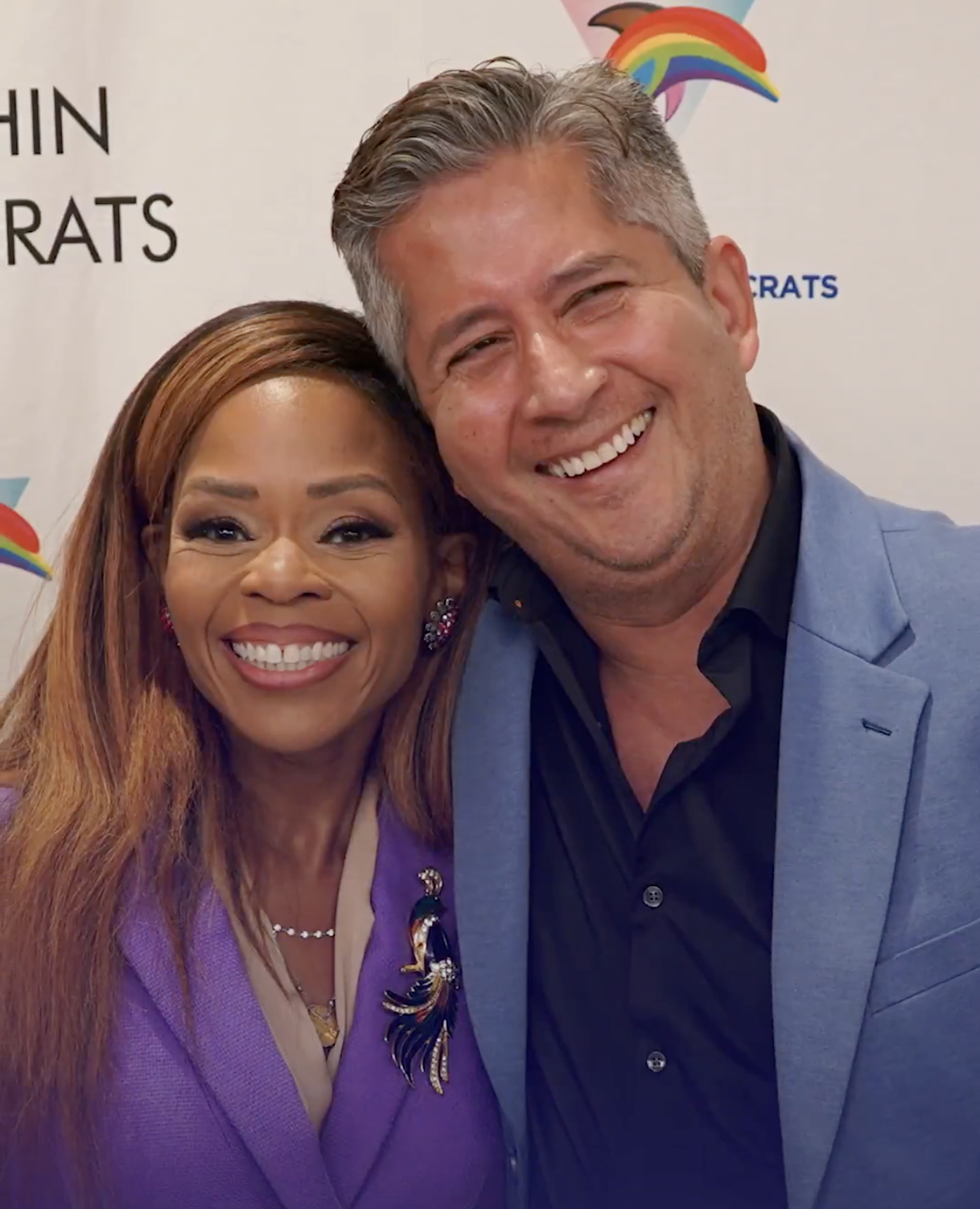
Cherfilus-McCormick with Dolphin Democrats president Alfredo Olvera in May 2025

Cherfilus-McCormick was a member of the Congressional Black Caucus. She served on the Committee on Foreign Affairs and the Committee on Veterans' Affairs.

On April 21, 2026, Cherfilus-McCormick resigned from Congress minutes before a hearing on whether she should be expelled.

=== Committee assignments ===
For the 118th Congress:

- Committee on Foreign Affairs
  - Subcommittee on Africa
  - Subcommittee on Oversight and Accountability
- Committee on Veterans' Affairs
  - Subcommittee on Oversight and Investigations
  - Subcommittee on Technology Modernization (Ranking Member)

=== Caucus memberships ===
- Congressional Black Caucus
- Congressional Progressive Caucus
- Congressional LGBTQ+ Equality Caucus
- Congressional Ukraine Caucus
- Congressional Caucus for the Equal Rights Amendment

== Financial fraud charges ==
On December 27, 2023, the House Ethics Committee announced that it was investigating Cherfilus-McCormick over allegations that she had violated campaign finance laws, failed to submit required disclosures, and carried out improper hiring practices.

In January 2025, the state of Florida filed a $5 million lawsuit against Cherfilus-McCormick's South Florida-based Trinity Health Care Services business for knowingly accepting overpayments of invoices for work that was not actually performed during the COVID-19 pandemic.

In November 2025, Cherfilus-McCormick was indicted on charges that she "stole and laundered $5 million in federal relief funds and used the money for her congressional campaign". The specific charges included theft, money laundering, making illegal campaign contributions, and conspiring to file a false federal tax return. Claiming innocence, she pleaded not guilty. She faces up to 53 years in prison and millions of dollars in fines.

In January 2026, the investigative subcommittee of the House Committee on Ethics found that Cherfilus-McCormick's actions were consistent with the allegations in the criminal indictment against her, as well as more extensive misconduct, and included violations of campaign finance laws and regulations, criminal laws, the Ethics in Government Act, the Code of Ethics for Government Service, and House rules. Cherfilus-McCormick denied the allegations. The House Ethics Committee held a hearing on Cherfilus-McCormick's conduct on March 26, 2026. The following day, the bipartisan committee found her guilty on 25 of 27 charges. The finding paved the way for an expulsion vote by the full House of Representatives. Representative Greg Steube stated he intended to force a vote to expel Cherfilus-McCormick. Democratic representatives Vicente Gonzalez, Marie Gluesenkamp Perez, and Jim Himes suggested Cherfilus-McCormick should resign or be removed.

On April 21, 2026, Cherfilus-McCormick resigned her congressional post. She submitted her resignation minutes before a House Ethics Committee hearing; at that hearing, the committee was scheduled to consider recommending that she be removed from Congress.

== Electoral history ==
2018

2018 Florida's 20th congressional district Democratic primary
| Party | Candidate | Votes | % |
|---|---|---|---|
| Democratic | Alcee Hastings (incumbent) | 52,628 | 73.8 |
| Democratic | Sheila Cherfilus-McCormick | 18,697 | 26.2 |
| Total votes | | 71,325 | 100 |

2020

2020 Florida's 20th congressional district Democratic primary
| Party | Candidate | Votes | % |
|---|---|---|---|
| Democratic | Alcee Hastings (incumbent) | 62,759 | 69.3 |
| Democratic | Sheila Cherfilus-McCormick | 27,831 | 30.7 |
| Total votes | | 90,590 | 100 |

2022

2022 Florida's 20th congressional district special Democratic primary
| Party | Candidate | Votes | % |
|---|---|---|---|
| Democratic | Sheila Cherfilus-McCormick | 11,662 | 23.764 |
| Democratic | Dale Holness | 11,657 | 23.753 |
| Democratic | Barbara Sharief | 8,680 | 17.7 |
| Democratic | Perry Thurston | 7,282 | 14.8 |
| Democratic | Bobby DuBose | 3,458 | 7.1 |
| Democratic | Omari Hardy | 2,902 | 5.9 |
| Democratic | Priscilla Taylor | 1,677 | 3.4 |
| Democratic | Elvin Dowling | 646 | 1.3 |
| Democratic | Emmanuel Morel | 454 | 0.9 |
| Democratic | Phil Jackson | 342 | 0.7 |
| Democratic | Imran Siddiqui | 316 | 0.6 |
| Total votes | | 49,074 | 100 |

2022 Florida's 20th congressional district special election
| Party | Candidate | Votes | % |
|---|---|---|---|
| Democratic | Sheila Cherfilus-McCormick | 44,707 | 79.0 |
| Republican | Jason Mariner | 10,966 | 19.4 |
| Libertarian | Mike ter Maat | 395 | 0.7 |
| Independent | Jim Flynn | 265 | 0.5 |
| Independent | Lenny Serratore | 262 | 0.5 |
| Total votes | | 56,595 | 100 |

2022 Florida's 20th congressional district Democratic primary
| Party | Candidate | Votes | % |
|---|---|---|---|
| Democratic | Sheila Cherfilus-McCormick (incumbent) | 47,601 | 65.6 |
| Democratic | Dale Holness | 20,783 | 28.6 |
| Democratic | Anika Omphroy | 4,197 | 5.8 |
| Total votes | | 72,581 | 100 |

2022 Florida's 20th congressional district election
| Party | Candidate | Votes | % |
|---|---|---|---|
| Democratic | Sheila Cherfilus-McCormick (incumbent) | 136,215 | 72.3 |
| Republican | Drew Montez Clark | 52,151 | 27.6 |
| Total votes | | 188,366 | 100 |

2024

2024 Florida's 20th congressional district election
| Party | Candidate | Votes | % |
|---|---|---|---|
| Democratic | Sheila Cherfilus-McCormick (incumbent) | unopposed | 100 |
| Total votes | | N/A | 100 |

2026

2026 Florida's 20th congressional district Democratic primary
| Party | Candidate | Votes | % |
|---|---|---|---|
| Democratic | Debbie Wasserman Schultz (incumbent) | 30,505 | 45.3 |
| Democratic | Dale Holness | 15,571 | 23.1 |
| Democratic | Elijah Manley | 9,377 | 13.9 |
| Democratic | Sheila Cherfilus-McCormick | 6,193 | 9.2 |
| Democratic | Luther "Uncle Luke" Campbell | 5,691 | 8.4 |
| Total votes | | 67,337 | 100 |

== Personal life ==
Cherfilus-McCormick married lawyer Corlie McCormick in 2017. They reside in Miramar, Florida, and have two children together.

Cherfilus-McCormick is Protestant.

== See also ==
- List of African-American United States representatives
- Women in the United States House of Representatives

U.S. House of Representatives
| Preceded by Alcee Hastings | Member of the U.S. House of Representatives from Florida's 20th congressional district 2022–2026 | Vacant |
U.S. order of precedence (ceremonial)
| Preceded by Francis Rooney as Former U.S. Representative | Order of precedence of the United States as Former U.S. Representative | Succeeded by Alan Steelman as Former U.S. Representative |
