= Jervonte Edmonds =

American politician (born 1991)

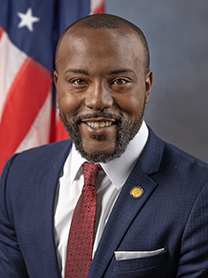

Member of the Florida House of Representatives from the 88th district
- Incumbent
- Assumed office March 8, 2022
- Preceded by: Omari Hardy

Personal details
- Born: June 11, 1991 (age 35) Titusville, Florida, U.S.
- Party: Democratic
- Education: Florida Atlantic University
- Website: jervonteedmonds.com

Jervonte Edmonds (born June 11, 1991) is an American politician. A member of the Democratic Party, he represents the 88th district in the Florida House of Representatives.

Edmonds was born in Titusville, Florida. He attended Florida Atlantic University, where he earned his bachelor's degree in 2015. He settled in West Palm Beach, Florida. In 2022, Edmonds was elected for the 88th district of the Florida House of Representatives against Guarina Torres. He succeeded Omari Hardy. Edmonds assumed office on March 8, 2022.
