= Omari Hardy =

American politician

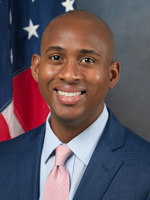

Member of the Florida House of Representatives from the 88th district
- In office November 3, 2020 – January 10, 2022
- Preceded by: Al Jacquet
- Succeeded by: Jervonte Edmonds

Personal details
- Born: November 28, 1989 (age 36) Fort Lauderdale, Florida, U.S.
- Party: Democratic
- Education: University of Miami (BA)

Omari J. Hardy (born November 28, 1989) is an American politician and former member of the Florida House of Representatives from the 88th district. He assumed office on November 3, 2020, and left on January 10, 2022, following an unsuccessful run for congress.

== Early life and education ==
Hardy was born in Fort Lauderdale, Florida. He earned a Bachelor of Arts degree in economics from the University of Miami.

== Career ==
Before winning a seat in the Florida House of Representatives, Hardy worked as an educator and served as a member of the Lake Worth Beach, Florida City Commission.

Viral City Commission Meeting

Hardy gained national attention in March 2020, when a video of a Lake Worth Beach City Commission meeting went viral. Before the meeting, Hardy advocated for emergency measures at the start the covid-19 pandemic, including a moratorium on utility shutoffs, paid emergency leave for city employees, and a guarantee that the city would reimburse its employees for medical expenses related to the virus.

Hardy's requests were met with resistance, leading to an emergency commission meeting in which Hardy condemned then City Manager Michael Bornstein for allowing utility shutoffs to proceed. Hardy also accused Mayor Triolo of failing to act in the best interests of city residents, saying “We cut people’s utilities this week and made them pay — with what could have been their last check — to turn their lights off in a global health pandemic. But you don’t care about that!”

Bornstein later acknowledged that the city did shutoff utilities for "approximately 100 customers" earlier that week. But he also said that the shutoffs were reversed the day before the meeting. Triolo accused Hardy of political grandstanding.

Video of the exchange, uploaded to YouTube by the Palm Beach Post, quickly gained millions of views, earning Hardy support from figures such as Shaquille O’Neale, Charlamagne tha God, and Congresswoman Rashida Tlaib.

Florida House of Representatives

In October 2019, Hardy announced his intentions to run for Florida House District 88. He resigned from the city commission the next year, in accordance with Florida's "resign to run" statute, in order to qualify for primary election.

During debate in the House Chambers, Hardy drew statewide attention when he stated that Republican representative Michelle Salzman called Republican representative Webster Barnaby a "token black republican."

=== 2022 congressional special election ===
In April 2021, Hardy announced his candidacy for Florida's 20th congressional district in a special election to succeed Alcee Hastings, who had died earlier that month after a multi-year battle with pancreatic cancer. Hardy ran on a progressive platform, pledging support for Medicare for All and the Green New Deal.

Hardy declared his support for the boycott, divestment and sanctions of Israel, stating "...You have to speak the truth. You have to be clear about the difference between right and wrong" and indicated support for Palestinians. The centrist pro-Israel group Democratic Majority for Israel released campaign ads accusing Hardy of antisemitism because of his support for Boycott, Divestment, and Sanctions and his opposition to funding for the Iron Dome, an Israeli air defense system.

Hardy lost the election, garnering just under 6% of the vote.

== Personal life ==
Hardy was diagnosed with attention deficit hyperactivity disorder in 2011.

Florida House of Representatives
Preceded by Al Jacquet	Member of the Florida House of Representatives from the 88th district 2020–2022	Succeeded by Jervonte Edmonds
