= Vicente González =

Vicente González may refer to:

- Vicente González (governor) (fl. 1570s), governor of Spanish Florida
- Vicente González de Santianes, Spanish colonial official, Governor of Nuevo León, 1773–1788
- Vicente González Moreno (1778–1839), Spanish general
- Vicente García González (1833–1886), Cuban general, disputed president
- Vicente González (footballer) (1904–?), Argentine footballer
- Guyún (Vicente González Rubiera, 1908–1987), Cuban classical guitarist
- Vicente González Lizondo (1942–1996), Spanish politician, co-founder of the Valencian Union
- Vicente González-Villamil (born 1947), Spanish footballer
- Vicente Gonzalez (American politician) (born 1967), American politician from Texas
