= Mack Bernard =

American businessman (born 1976)

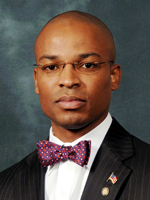

Member of the Florida Senate from the 24th district
- Incumbent
- Assumed office November 19, 2024
- Preceded by: Bobby Powell

Member of the Palm Beach County Commission from the 7th district
- In office November 22, 2016 – November 5, 2024
- Preceded by: Priscilla Taylor
- Succeeded by: Bobby Powell

Member of the Florida House of Representatives from the 27th district
- In office September 22, 2009 – November 6, 2012
- Preceded by: Priscilla Taylor
- Succeeded by: Larry Lee Jr.

Personal details
- Born: March 4, 1976 (age 50) Port au Prince, Haiti
- Party: Democratic
- Spouse: Shawn Bernard
- Children: 3
- Education: University of Florida; Florida State University College of Law
- Profession: Lawyer, business executive

Mackenson "Mack" Bernard (born March 4, 1976) is a Haitian-born American politician who has served as a member of the Florida Senate since 2024. He lives in Boynton Beach, Florida. Bernard moved to Florida in 1986.

== Political career ==
He was first elected to the Florida House of Representatives in 2009 as a Democrat in the 27th district.

In 2012, Bernard ran for a seat in the 27th district of the Florida Senate, facing fellow Representative Jeff Clemens. Clemens won the endorsement of labor unions AFL-CIO and SEIU, while Bernard received the endorsement of the Florida Chamber of Commerce. In the end, Clemens was able to narrowly defeat Bernard by only seventeen votes in the primary election. Bernard held out hope, however, that Clemens's victory would be overturned and filed a lawsuit to have forty absentee ballots counted. A judge in Tallahassee ruled against Bernard but allowed nine provisional ballots to be counted, which would not have been enough to allow Bernard to emerge victorious. In the general election, Clemens remained on the ballot as the Democratic nominee, and was elected unopposed.

In June 2024, Bernard was elected to the Florida Senate as he was the sole candidate to file in a special election to succeed Bobby Powell. The move was done as part of a "seat swap" while Powell runs for Bernard's seat on the Palm Beach County Commission.
