= Florida's 88th House of Representatives district =

Florida district

Florida's 88th State House of Representatives district
Representative
Jervonte Edmonds; D–West Palm Beach
- Demographics: 20% White; 49% Black; 24% Hispanic; 3% Asian; 0% Native American; 0% Hawaiian/Pacific Islander; 0% Other; 4% Multiracial
- Population (2024): 184,605

Florida's 88th House of Representatives district elects one member of the Florida House of Representatives. It contains parts of Palm Beach County.

== Members ==
Portrait	Name	Party	Years of service	Home city/state	Notes	Ref.
	Al Jacquet	Democratic	2016–2020			
	Omari Hardy	Democratic	2020–2022			
	Jervonte Edmonds	Democratic	since 2022	West Palm Beach, Florida	Palm Beach County	
