= Stacey Campfield =

American politician (born 1968)

Member of the Tennessee Senate from the 7th district
- In office January 11, 2011 – January 13, 2015
- Preceded by: Tim Burchett
- Succeeded by: Richard Briggs

Member of the Tennessee House of Representatives from the 18th district
- In office January 3, 2005 – January 11, 2011
- Preceded by: Steven Buttry
- Succeeded by: Steve Hall

Personal details
- Born: June 8, 1968 (age 58) Johnson City, New York, U.S.
- Party: Republican
- Education: Broome Community College (AA); Excelsior University (AS, BS)
- Website: House website Senate website

Stacey Campfield (born June 8, 1968) is an American politician who represented Knoxville in the Tennessee General Assembly. From 2005 to 2011, he represented the 18th district in the House of Representatives. In 2010, he was elected to represent the 7th district of the Senate, where he served from 2011 to 2015. He is a Republican.

During his legislative career, Campfield became known for his socially conservative legislative proposals and controversial public statements. In 2014, he lost his Senate renomination campaign to Richard Briggs.

== Early life, education, and career ==
Stacey Campfield was born on June 8, 1968. Though primarily raised in Vestal, New York, he often spent summer months in Tennessee. He graduated from Vestal High School in 1986. He received one associate degree from Broome Community College, and a second from Regents College along with a BS in management. He also attended St. John Fisher University before moving to Knoxville.

Campfield entered politics during the 2000 United States presidential election, campaigning for George W. Bush. In 2002, Campfield was one of two men removed from the Knoxville Civic Coliseum following a confrontation over a sign he carried that mocked Phil Bredesen as the "Tax 'n' Spend Governor." Campfield later joined Newt Gingrich's 2012 presidential campaign as a Tennessee campaign co-director.

Besides his political activities, Campfield worked in real estate redevelopment. He participated in several organizations including the Young Republicans, the College Republicans, the United Way, and the American Red Cross. He also taught martial arts, including jujutsu, at the University of Tennessee.

== Tennessee House of Representatives (2005–2011) ==
=== Elections ===
Campfield was first elected in 2004 to the Tennessee House of Representatives. He represented the 18th district, encompassing parts of Knox County.

During the 2008 election campaign season, Campfield made a public blog post falsely accusing Democrat Roger Byrge, a candidate to represent the 36th district of the state house, of having been arrested on a drug charge — Byrge's son was the actual arrestee. After narrowly losing the election to Republican Chad Faulkner, Byrge sued Campfield for libel. Campfield described the lawsuit as "laughable," explaining that he had made the false claims after misunderstanding a hypothetical comment by Glen Casada. In 2013, a judge dismissed the lawsuit, finding that Campfield may have believed the false statement at the time of writing. However, on appeal, the lawsuit was reinstated, with a second judge concluding that, even if Campfield believed the false statement, he may still have recklessly tarnished Byrge's reputation by never attempting to verify the claim before publicly promoting it.

=== Tenure ===
In 2007, Campfield sponsored a bill to issue death certificates for aborted fetuses, claiming it would show the number of lives ended by abortion. Tennessee already required abortions to be reported, and the state's Office of Vital Records made the number of abortions publicly available. Democrat Rob Briley criticized the bill as "preposterous" and "a huge waste of taxpayer money."

In 2008, Campfield proposed a bill to ban elementary and middle school teachers from teaching about any "sexual orientation other than heterosexuality," saying the topic should be left to families. The Tennessee Equality Project opposed the bill, arguing that although teachers need not advocate for or against homosexuality, they should be allowed to let students debate the issue. The bill ultimately died in committee. The same year, Campfield sponsored bills requiring state colleges to allow employees with handgun permits to carry the weapons on campus and prohibiting colleges from admitting undocumented immigrants.

In 2010, Campfield sponsored a bill to make the names of people with state-issued handgun permits private.

==== Black Legislative Caucus membership ====
In 2005, Campfield inquired about joining the Black Legislative Caucus. When rebuffed by chairman Johnny Shaw, Campfield criticized the group's bylaws as racist and suggested they were more discriminatory than those of the Ku Klux Klan. Shaw considered calling a caucus vote on granting Campfield honorary membership without voting rights, but Campfield said he only wanted full membership. In response to the incident, the Nashville Branch of the NAACP called for Campfield's resignation.

==== Rental properties controversy ====
In January 2009, four University of Tennessee students renting one of Campfield's properties alleged he slow-walked major repairs to the property and threatened to sue the students if they attempted to leave. When Campfield allegedly failed to return multiple calls from the students, one tenant contacted Knoxville's city codes enforcement office. While investigating the property, the office found 47 code violations, including a basement flooded with water and feces, leaking faucets, inoperable windows, missing gutters, and improper wiring. The office deemed the home "unfit for human habitation." Campfield insisted that he would make all necessary repairs to the property but alleged some problems were the fault of the tenants and others had been exaggerated.

==== Halloween football game incident ====
On October 31, 2009, Campfield was escorted out of a Tennessee Volunteers football game. According to reports, a mother filed a complaint after Campfield, wearing a wrestling mask in violation of stadium policy, frightened her two daughters. Campfield agreed to remove the mask when confronted by a deputy; however, he then attempted to enter a section of the stadium different than the one indicated on his ticket. The deputy, believing their interaction had been misinterpreted, questioned Campfield, who allegedly became defensive and argumentative. Ultimately, the deputy and another officer escorted Campfield out.

== Tennessee Senate (2011–2015) ==
=== Elections ===
In 2010, Campfield declared his candidacy for Tennessee's 7th Senate district, which was previously represented by Tim Burchett and included parts of Knox County, such as Fort Sanders, Fourth and Gill, and Downtown Knoxville. During the campaign, he came under fire for having lived with a convicted sex criminal — Campfield stated that he had rented the man a room out of his house before becoming aware of his history, at which point Campfield terminated the arrangement. Campfield won the Republican primary with a plurality of votes, and defeated Democrat Randy Walker in the general election.

In 2014, having drawn criticism from members of his own party, Campfield was challenged in the Republican primary by Knox County Commissioner Richard Briggs. Briggs received public praise from Bill Haslam and significantly outraised Campfield. On August 7, 2014, Briggs handily defeated Campfield by a 38-point margin.

=== Tenure ===
In 2011, Campfield proposed legislation requiring that individuals seeking government-related benefits pay for drug tests to confirm eligibility. Later that year, he revived his 2008 bill banning instruction on homosexuality in schools, branded as the "Don't Say Gay" bill, which was successfully voted through Senate committee. However, the bill was not taken up by the House of Representatives, and Campfield would continue to push similar legislation; his 2013 version of the bill drew a rebuke from the American Civil Liberties Union for an additional provision requiring school nurses and guidance counselors to report gay or questioning students to their parents.

In 2012, Campfield introduced a bill to shift Tennessee from an open-primary to a closed-primary system and require voters to affiliate with a party before voting in that party's primary. Campfield argued that voters sometimes participate in another party's primary to promote weaker candidates or those aligned more closely to the voter's own party's political positions.

In 2013, Campfield introduced a bill to cut by 30 percent payments made to parents or caretakers of children through Tennessee's Temporary Assistance to Needy Families program if the children fail to meet requirements for grades or attendance, if the children are not enrolled in free tutoring programs, and if the parent refuses to attend parent-teacher conferences or parent counseling. Opponents deemed the legislation the "Starve Our Children" bill, and Campfield postponed proceedings after an organized protest by community activists at the State Capitol.

In 2014, Campfield was among a group of lawmakers considering legislation to cut off water and electricity to facilities run by the National Security Agency and similar entities they accused of unconstitutional spying. Campfield acknowledged the proposal would be unable to significantly impact federal surveillance, but argued it would still be appropriate for the state to refuse to subsidize the agency. At the time, it was not clear if Tennessee had an NSA facility within the state.

==== Signorile interview and aftermath ====
In January 2012, following a reintroduction of the "Don't Say Gay" bill, Campfield was interviewed by Michelangelo Signorile. Campfield replied to a question about the origin of AIDS: "Most people realize that AIDS came from the homosexual community – it was one guy screwing a monkey, if I recall correctly, and then having sex with men... My understanding is that it is virtually – not completely, but virtually – impossible to contract AIDS through heterosexual sex." PolitiFact described Campfield's characterization of the origin of AIDS as "Pants on Fire!" false.

In the same interview, Campfield described concerns about the bullying of LGBTQ youth as "the biggest lark out there. Tennessee already has anti-bullying laws that cover everyone, and many groups are using 'bullying' to push their social agenda in schools." Later, in the comment sections of news articles reporting his behavior, Campfield compared homosexuality to heroin injection and attributed Africa's disproportionately high rate of AIDS to the prevalence of anal sex.

In the aftermath of the incident, Martha Boggs, a Knoxville cafe owner, ordered Campfield out of her restaurant, citing his comments on AIDS and the LGBTQ community. Campfield was also criticized by students and alumni of his high school alma mater, who called for him to be removed from the school's Hall of Fame, into which he had been inducted in 2008.

==== Obamacare Holocaust comparison ====
On May 5, 2014, Campfield made a blog post comparing mandatory signups under the Affordable Care Act to mandatory "train rides" in Nazi Germany. Campfield was criticized across the political spectrum, including by state party chairs Chris Devaney and Roy Herron, as well as Governor Haslam. When confronted, Campfield largely stood by his comparison, but regretted "that some people have missed the point."

== Public image ==
Campfield's time in the legislature was contentious, and he frequently faced criticism from across the political spectrum. His behavior and public comments garnered attention and criticism from national figures including comedian Stephen Colbert, filmmaker Del Shores, and entertainers Penn & Teller. During later political runs, he was described as a "magnet for controversy." Political opponents variously described him as strange or crazy, and as a grandstander more focused on wedge issues than viable legislation. Jesse Fox Mayshark, a contributor to the Metro Pulse, reinforced these characterizations when he described his interview with Campfield as a "conversation with Knoxville’s weirdest politician." However, Mayshark also described Campfield as genial, engaging, and even-keeled, while noting his apparent confusion at being singled out as unusual.

In 2014, the Music City Theatre Company, a Nashville-based theatre group, announced the debut of Casey Stampfield: The Musical, a stage production centered on Campfield. Campfield welcomed news of the production, saying, "I’m always for taking a step back and enjoying good political satire."

== Post-legislative life ==
=== Elections ===
Campfield has twice sought to return to political office. In 2018, he announced his candidacy for the 89th district in the Tennessee House, seeking to succeed Roger Kane. During the campaign, he posted a campaign video calling out the "fake news" while surrounded by copies of Knoxville News Sentinel newspapers. Campfield ultimately placed third in the election, losing to small business owner Justin Lafferty. In 2026, Campfield declared his candidacy for the 5th district in the Tennessee Senate, which was represented by Randy McNally, the retiring Speaker of the Tennessee Senate and Lieutenant Governor. He later withdrew from the race and endorsed former colleague Jimmy Matlock.

== Personal life ==
Campfield is unmarried and has no children. He is a Catholic.

== Electoral history ==
Electoral history of Stacey Campfield
Year	Office	District	Party	Primary			General			Result	Ref.
Year	Office	District	Party	Total	%	P.	Total	%	P.	Result	Ref.
2002	Tennessee House of Representatives	18	Republican	3,056	46.56%	2nd	—	—	—	Lost	
2004	Tennessee House of Representatives	18	Republican	2,444	50.20%	1st	17,474	65.36%	1st	Won	
2006	Tennessee House of Representatives	18	Republican	3,772	70.11%	1st	10,366	53.78%	1st	Won	
2008	Tennessee House of Representatives	18	Republican	2,493	53.53%	1st	21,973	100.00%	1st	Won	
2010	Tennessee Senate	7	Republican	7,708	39.85%	1st	22,661	57.16%	1st	Won	
2014	Tennessee Senate	7	Republican	5,864	29.14%	2nd	—	—	—	Lost	
2018	Tennessee House of Representatives	89	Republican	1,929	21.36%	3rd	—	—	—	Lost	
