= Tim Burchett =

American politician (born 1964)

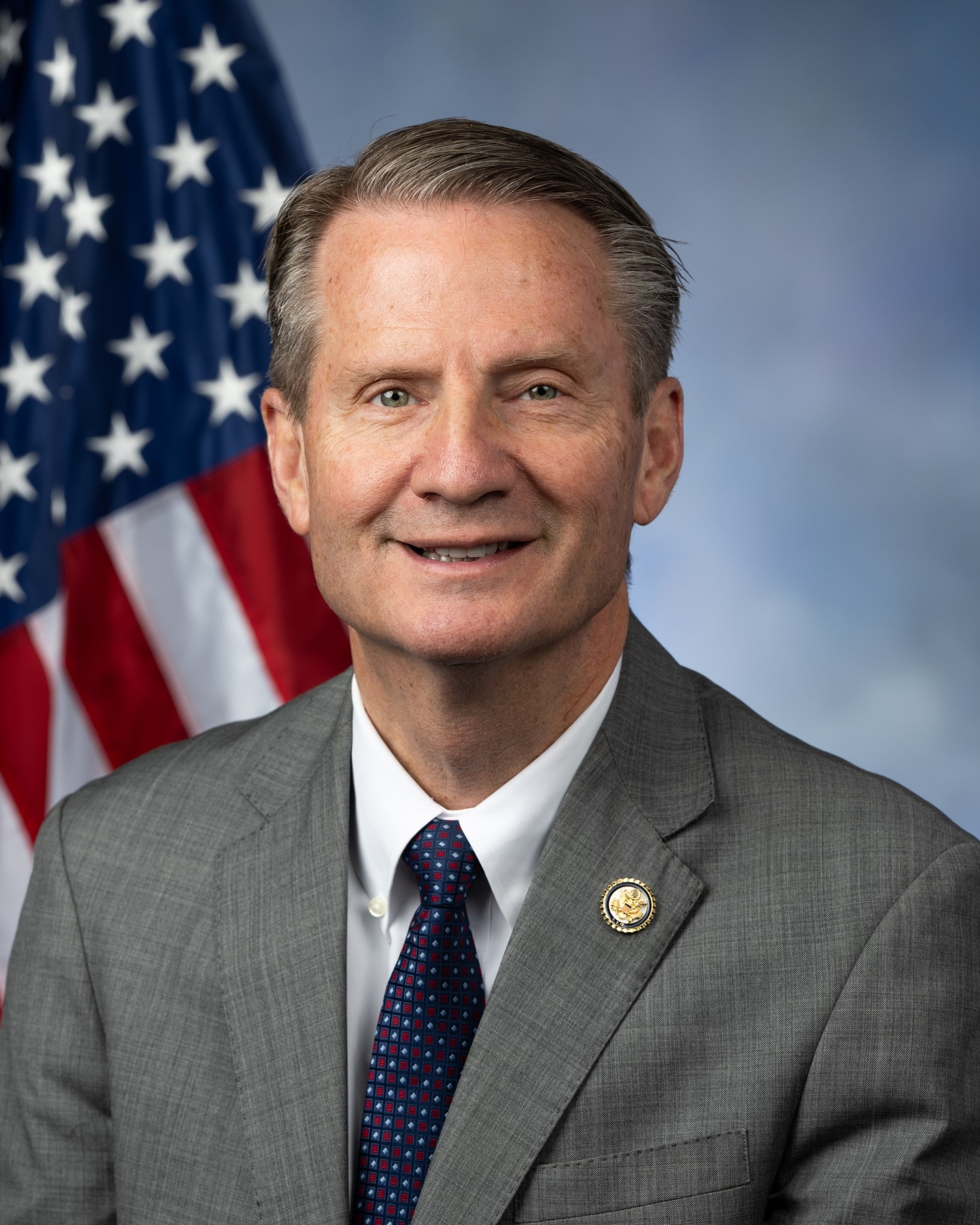
- Official portrait, 2025

Member of the U.S. House of Representatives from Tennessee's 2nd district
- Incumbent
- Assumed office January 3, 2019
- Preceded by: Jimmy Duncan

Mayor of Knox County
- In office September 1, 2010 – September 1, 2018
- Preceded by: Mike Ragsdale
- Succeeded by: Glenn Jacobs

Member of the Tennessee Senate from the 7th district
- In office January 12, 1999 – September 1, 2010
- Preceded by: Bud Gilbert
- Succeeded by: Stacey Campfield

Member of the Tennessee House of Representatives from the 18th district
- In office January 10, 1995 – January 12, 1999
- Preceded by: Maria Peroulas Draper
- Succeeded by: Steven Buttry

Personal details
- Born: Timothy Floyd Burchett; August 25, 1964 (age 62) Knoxville, Tennessee, U.S.
- Party: Republican
- Spouses: Allison Beaver (m. 2008; div. 2012); Kelly Kimball (m. 2014)
- Children: 1
- Education: University of Tennessee (BS)
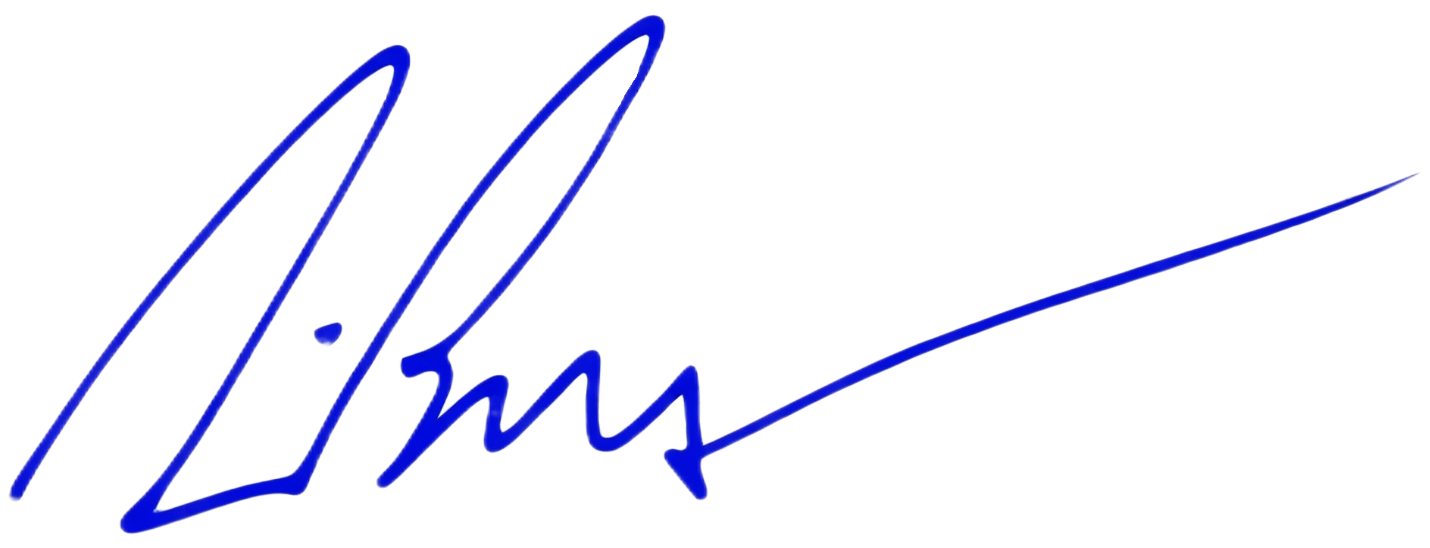
- Signature
- Website: House website Campaign website

Timothy Floyd Burchett (/ˈbɜːrtʃɪt/ BUR-chit; born August 25, 1964) is an American politician who is the U.S. representative for Tennessee's 2nd congressional district, based in Knoxville, serving since 2019.

A Republican, Burchett was formerly mayor of Knox County, Tennessee. He served in the Tennessee General Assembly, first in the Tennessee House of Representatives, in which he represented Tennessee's 18th district. He later served in the Tennessee Senate, representing the 7th district, part of Knox County.

Burchett is a part of the new House subcommittee overseeing President Trump's Department of Government Efficiency.

== Early life and education ==
Burchett is a native of Knoxville, Tennessee, where he was born in 1964. He attended West Hills Elementary School, Bearden Junior High School, and Bearden High School. After graduating from Bearden High School in 1982, he enrolled in the University of Tennessee in Knoxville, where he earned a Bachelor of Science in education in 1988. He is a member of the Sigma Chi fraternity.

== Tennessee General Assembly ==
Burchett's first election to public office was in 1994, when he won a seat in the Tennessee House of Representatives. He served in the House for two two-year terms, from 1995 to 1998. In 1998, he won a four-year term in the Tennessee Senate, representing the 7th district. He succeeded Clyde Coulter "Bud" Gilbert. He was re-elected twice, serving a total of three four-year terms, from 1999 to 2010.

In 1999, Burchett received national media attention for sponsoring a bill to legalize the eating of roadkill, wild animals killed by vehicles, before notifying the county game warden. He defended the proposal as a "common-sense thing" intended to prevent edible meat from being wasted. Eating roadkill was already legal – as it is in most places – but required prior notification of the county game warden. Burchett's bill allowed processing and consumption of roadkill before notifying the warden. Burchett proposed the bill after being contacted by a constituent who had been penalized for giving a needy family the meat from a deer his vehicle had accidentally hit.

In 2006, while a state senator, Burchett failed to report six political action committee checks totaling $3,300. The Registry of Election Finance did not fine him. In 2008, while still a state senator, he was fined $250 for failing to disclose three PAC contributions that totaled $1,500.

=== Tennessee Senate leadership vote ===
In January 2005, following the 2004 elections that gave Republicans their first Senate majority since 1869 by a single seat, Burchett and fellow Republican senator Michael Williams broke ranks during the leadership vote. The two sided with Democrats to re-elect long-time Senate Speaker John Wilder by an 18–15 margin. Their defections ensured Wilder's eighteenth term as Speaker and lieutenant governor, maintaining Democratic control of the chamber's leadership at the time. After the 2006 elections, however, both Williams and Burchett supported Republican Ron Ramsey for Senate Speaker in January 2007, helping him secure the position.

=== Proposal of salvia ban ===
Burchett sponsored a bill in 2006 to make illegal "possessing, producing, manufacturing, distributing, or possessing with intent to produce, manufacture, or distribute the active chemical ingredient in the hallucinogenic plant Salvia divinorum in the state of Tennessee." He said, "We have enough problems with illegal drugs as it is without people promoting getting high from some glorified weed that's been brought up from Mexico. The only people I've heard from who are opposed to making it illegal are those who are getting stoned on it." The bill was signed into law on May 19, 2006, and went into effect on July 1, 2006. Burchett originally wanted to make violations a felony offense, but the bill was amended during its passage to make it a Class A misdemeanor.

In a news report published shortly before the signing of the bill by Governor Phil Bredesen, Burchett was quoted as saying, "it's not that popular but I'm one of those who believes in closing the barn door before the cows get out.... in certain hands, it could be very dangerous, even lethal." A store owner who had stopped selling the herb due to Burchett's bill said that he saw little point in banning salvia, "I have no idea why it's being outlawed. It's a sage. People in South America have been using it for years and years." The same report also gave the general counterargument of salvia proponents that legislation banning Salvia divinorum reflects a cultural bias, as there are fewer prohibitions on more addictive substances such as alcohol and nicotine, and questioned how effective the bill will be, pointing out that Salvia divinorum has no odor and is easy to grow, so enforcement will be difficult.

== Knox County mayor ==
Burchett became Knox County mayor in September 2010, succeeding Mike Ragsdale, who left office due to term limits. Burchett defeated former Knox County Sheriff Tim Hutchison in the Republican primary and Democratic nominee Ezra Maize in the general election.

On February 10, 2012, Burchett appeared on WBIR-TV and officially announced that the county's first "cash mob" would be held at the Emery's 5 & 10 store in South Knoxville. The cash mob gained national attention, and was mentioned in Time magazine.

In 2012, Tennessee's Registry of Election Finance unanimously decided to take no action against Burchett regarding an inquiry into his campaign disclosure forms.

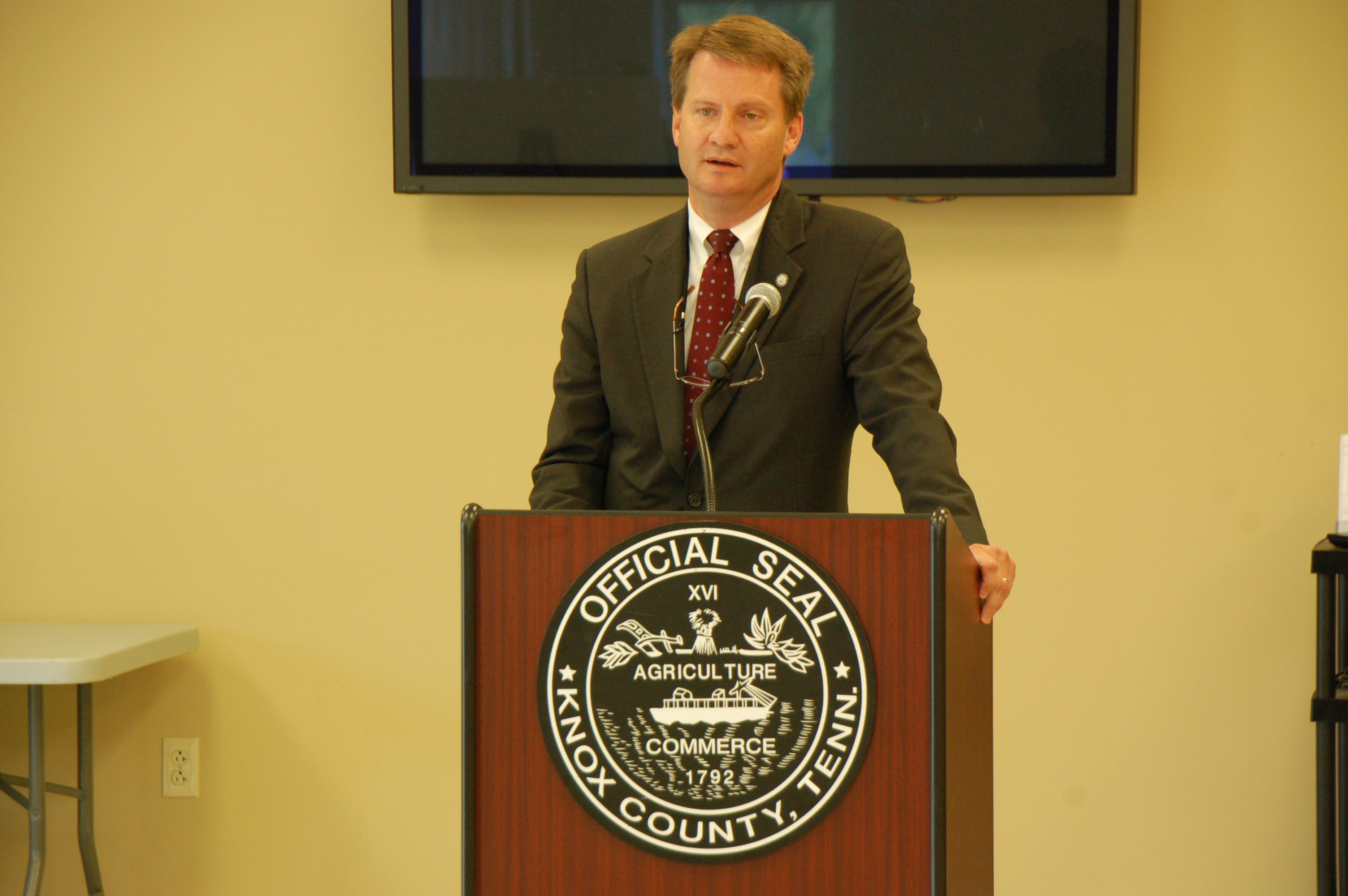
Burchett speaking at the 2012 community budget hearings

=== 2014 re-election ===
In 2014 Burchett ran unopposed in both the primary and the general election.

== U.S. House of Representatives ==
=== Elections ===
==== 2018 ====
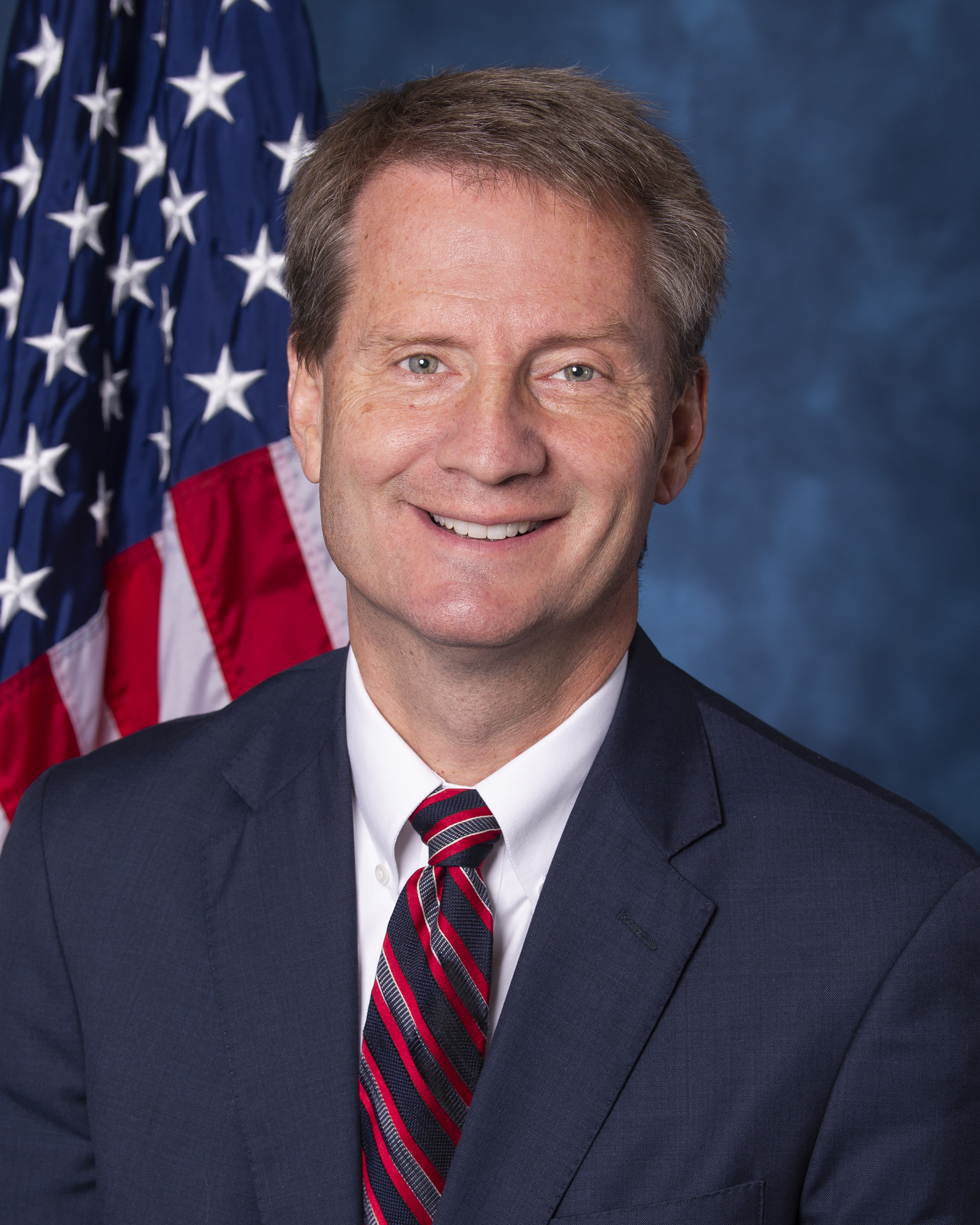
Burchett's official portrait, 2019

When 30-year incumbent Jimmy Duncan announced his retirement in July 2017, Burchett entered a crowded seven-way Republican primary to succeed him. He defeated his nearest challenger, state representative Jimmy Matlock, by just under 12 percentage points. He faced Democratic nominee Renee Hoyos in the November general election. The 2nd has long been a Republican stronghold. With a Cook Partisan Voting Index of R+20, it is one of the nation's most Republican districts, and tied for the third-most Republican district in Tennessee. It is one of the few ancestrally Republican districts in the South; the GOP and its predecessors have held it without interruption since 1859. For this reason, the Republican primary has long been reckoned as the real contest in this district. Democrats have not made a substantive bid for the seat since 1964, and have received as much as 40% of the vote only twice since then.

As expected, Burchett won the general election in a rout, taking 65.9% of the vote to Hoyos's 33.1%. When he took office in January 2019, Burchett became only the seventh person (not counting caretakers) to represent the 2nd since 1909. This district gives its representatives very long tenures in Washington; all six of Burchett's predecessors held the seat for at least 10 years, with three of them serving at least 20 years. He also ended a 54-year hold on the district by the Duncan family. John Duncan Sr. won the seat in 1964, and was succeeded upon his death in 1988 by his son, Jimmy.

In February 2018 the Knoxville News Sentinel reported that Burchett had failed to report a $10,000 payment from a solar electric company on his campaign finance forms and various financial disclosure forms. The story reported that two months earlier the FBI had questioned people about Burchett committing income tax evasion. After the story broke, Burchett gave a statement to WBIR that he was correcting errors in his campaign financial disclosures and income tax forms, describing his failure to report all income as an "oversight".

==== 2020 ====
Burchett was reelected in 2020 with 67.6% of the vote, defeating Democrat Renee Hoyos.

=== Tenure ===
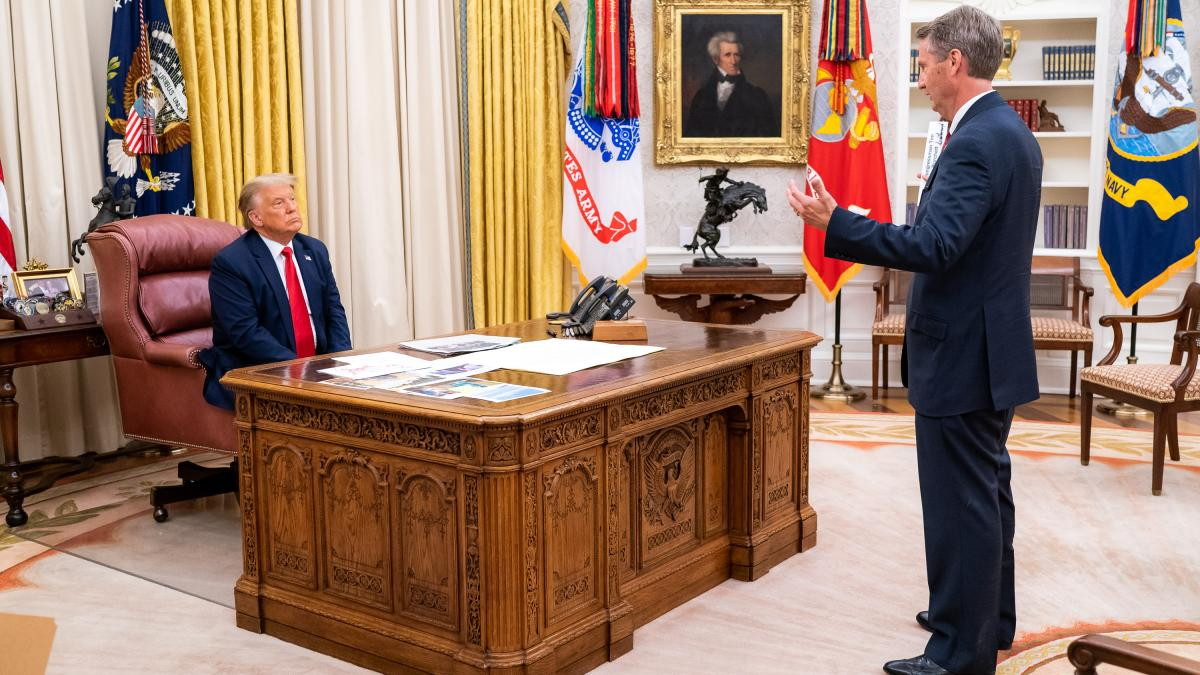
Burchett with President Donald Trump in the Oval Office, 2020

==== Agriculture ====
In March 2024, Burchett was one of 10 House Republicans who signed a letter to the House Agriculture Committee opposing the inclusion of the Ending Agriculture Trade Suppression (EATS) Act in the 2024 farm bill. The EATS Act would have invalidated state and local laws regulating agricultural goods sold in interstate commerce, including farm animal welfare laws like California's Proposition 12. The letter argued that the legislation would undermine states' rights and cede control over U.S. agricultural policy to the Chinese-owned pork producer WH Group and its subsidiary Smithfield Foods.

==== Iraq ====
In June 2021, Burchett was one of 49 House Republicans to vote to repeal the AUMF against Iraq.

==== Immigration ====
Burchett voted against the Further Consolidated Appropriations Act of 2020 which authorizes DHS to nearly double the available H-2B visas for the remainder of FY 2020.

Burchett voted against the Consolidated Appropriations Act (H.R. 1158), which effectively prohibits Immigration and Customs Enforcement from cooperating with the Department of Health and Human Services to detain or remove illegal alien sponsors of Unaccompanied Alien Children.

==== 2023 U.S. House Speaker election ====
During the 118th congressional speakership Election, Representative Matt Gaetz and a handful of other representatives were holdouts in voting for Rep. Kevin McCarthy for speaker. Burchett voted for McCarthy on every ballot. While people claimed that after Burchett walked over and whispered into Gaetz's ear, Gaetz and others abstained, giving a majority to McCarthy for speaker, Gaetz had in fact begun abstaining before this conversation.

==== Israel-Palestine ====
Burchett voted to provide Israel with support following October 7 attacks.

==== UFOs ====
Following a report published by the Office of the Director of National Intelligence on January 12, 2023, Burchett expressed his views about an alleged government coverup of the nature of UFOs, saying, "we've been covering this up since the '40s" and that he does not "trust [the] government, [and] there's an arrogance about it, and I think the American public can handle it."

On March 7, 2023, Burchett expanded on these claims, saying that UFO technology is possibly "being reverse-engineered right now" but we "don't understand" how it functions. He maintains that the U.S. has "recovered a craft at some point, and possible beings". In January 2025 Burchett claimed that aliens have secret underwater bases.

==== Tennessee school shooting response ====
On March 28, 2023, Burchett responded to the Covenant School shooting, where three nine-year-old students and three staff members were killed in Nashville, by telling reporters: "It's a horrible, horrible situation, and we're not going to fix it. Criminals are gonna be criminals. And my daddy fought in the second world war, fought in the Pacific, fought the Japanese, and he told me, he said, 'Buddy,' he said, 'if somebody wants to take you out, and doesn't mind losing their life, there's not a whole heck of a lot you can do about it.'" Burchett also said he sees no "real role" for Congress in reducing gun violence, other than to "mess things up".

==== 2024 Kansas City parade shooting response ====
After a local D.J. was killed and 22 others were wounded in the 2024 Kansas City parade shooting, Burchett inaccurately identified an adult attendee of the Kansas City rally, Denton Loudermill Jr., as the shooter, claiming he was an "illegal alien". Burchett's social media post received 1.4 million views. In March 2024, the falsely identified man sued Burchett for $75,000 in damages. The lawsuit, which Loudermill had filed in a Kansas court, was dismissed in September 2024 due to lack of jurisdiction, considering the case had "nothing really to do with Kansas."

==== Debt ceiling ====
In April 2023, Burchett was one of only four Republican representatives who voted against the proposed Limit, Save, Grow Act, which raised the debt ceiling while at the same time providing for cuts to non-mandatory spending, claiming he could not support any debt limit raise which did not provide fully balanced budget.

In June of the same year, Burchett was among the 71 Republicans who voted against final passage of the Fiscal Responsibility Act of 2023 in the House.

==== Removal of Speaker McCarthy ====
On October 3, 2023, Burchett was one of eight Republicans who voted to remove Kevin McCarthy as Speaker of the House. He said his yes vote was "sealed" after McCarthy allegedly made a "condescending" remark about his religious beliefs during a phone call. McCarthy said that he did not intend to upset Burchett.

==== George Soros ====
In October 2024, Burchett told a Fox News radio station that George Soros is "a money changer of the worst kind" who "will destroy this country." The term money changer has been associated with antisemitic stereotypes. Burchett denied that his criticism of Soros, who is Jewish, was antisemitic, saying that "my voting record clearly reflects my support for Israel and the Jewish people."

==== Alexandria Ocasio-Cortez ====
Despite their highly contrasting positions on most issues, Burchett maintains a friendship with progressive representative Alexandria Ocasio-Cortez, whom he met during freshmen orientation as a new representative in 2019 at the beginning of the 116th United States Congress.

==== Iran ====
Tim Burchett was opposed to U.S. military intervention against Iran, calling Senators Lindsey Graham and Ted Cruz "war pimps" for their advocacy for bombing Iran. Burchett said there was no "just cause" for military intervention, stating "I just don't see American boys and girls going to a faraway land that many of us couldn't even find on a map. Again, the Israelis can handle this thing. Let's let them handle it." However, after President Trump ordered strikes on Iranian nuclear sites in 2025, Burchett endorsed Trump's decision, saying that Trump had made the "right move".

During the 2026 Iran War, Burchett said he opposed the deployment of ground troops to Iran. "I wish it was over tomorrow. Yesterday, actually," Burchett said in April 2026. However, Burchett voted against a resolution that would have forced President Trump to cease military operations against Iran absent congressional approval.

==== One Big Beautiful Bill Act ====
Despite voting for the initial version of the One Big Beautiful Bill Act, Burchett was unhappy with the legislation, saying he was worried it would result in higher deficit spending. He said he would probably not vote for the final version of the law. Following personal lobbying from President Trump, who told Burchett he liked seeing him on TV and gave him signed merchandise, Burchett voted for the final version of the bill.

==== Cloud seeding ====
Burchett, alongside Marjorie Taylor Greene, introduced a bill that would ban cloud seeding used for weather modification. The subject of the bill alluded to the disproven chemtrail conspiracy theory. Burchett said he would tell skeptics of the existence of chemtrails; "If it doesn't exist, then you don't have anything to worry about."

==== Congressional stock trading ====
Burchett was one of the original 16 cosponsors of the Restore Trust in Congress Act (H.R.5106), introduced on September 3, 2025, by Republican Chip Roy of Texas. The act, a bipartisan effort to ban members of Congress and their spouses and dependents from owning and trading stocks, had 119 cosponsors as of December 2025.

==== Trump assassination attempt conspiracy theory ====
In November 2025, during an interview with Benny Johnson, Burchett said that Thomas Crooks, who tried and failed to kill Donald Trump during the 2024 United States presidential election, had been programmed to do so by the American "deep state". Burchett suggested that MKUltra, a defunct CIA brainwashing program, had been used to "program" Crooks into an assassin. Burchett said that commentary by Tucker Carlson had inspired his theory, and claimed that evidence for the theory had been destroyed.

=== Committee assignments ===
For the 119th Congress:

- Committee on Foreign Affairs
  - Subcommittee on the Middle East and North Africa
  - Subcommittee on South and Central Asia
- Committee on Oversight and Government Reform
  - Subcommittee on Delivering on Government Efficiency
  - Subcommittee on Government Operations
- Committee on Transportation and Infrastructure
  - Subcommittee on Aviation
  - Subcommittee on Highways and Transit
  - Subcommittee on Railroads, Pipelines, and Hazardous Materials

=== Caucus memberships ===
- Congressional Motorcycle Caucus
- House RV Caucus
- Republican Study Committee

== Electoral history ==
=== 1998 ===
1998 Tennessee Senate District 7 Republican primary
Party	Candidate	Votes	%
Republican	Tim Burchett	8,983	100.00
Total votes		8,983	100.00

1998 Tennessee Senate District 7 election
Party	Candidate	Votes	%
Republican	Tim Burchett	16,013	64.66
Democratic	Richard Baker	8,751	35.34
Write-in		1	0.00
Total votes		24,765	100.00
Republican hold			

=== 2002 ===
2002 Tennessee Senate District 7 Republican Primary
Party	Candidate	Votes	%
Republican	Tim Burchett (incumbent)	13,250	100.00
Write-in		4	0.03
Total votes		13,254	100.00

2002 Tennessee Senate District 7 election
Party	Candidate	Votes	%
Republican	Tim Burchett (incumbent)	26,812	59.34
Democratic	Bill Owen	17,210	38.09
Independent	Joe Burchfield	1,159	2.57
Total votes		45,181	100.00
Republican hold			

=== 2006 ===
2006 Tennessee Senate District 7 Republican Primary
Party	Candidate	Votes	%
Republican	Tim Burchett (incumbent)	11,372	100.00
Total votes		11,372	100.00

2006 Tennessee Senate District 7 election
Party	Candidate	Votes	%
Republican	Tim Burchett (incumbent)	36,594	100.00
Total votes		36,594	100.00
Republican hold			

=== 2010 ===
2010 Knox County, Tennessee, mayoral election Republican primary
Party	Candidate	Votes	%
Republican	Tim Burchett	29,716	85.14
Republican	Tim Hutchison	5,187	14.86
Total votes		34,903	100.00

2010 Knox County, Tennessee, mayoral election
Party	Candidate	Votes	%
Republican	Tim Burchett	53,381	88.30
Democratic	Ezra Maize	4,917	8.13
Independent	Lewis F. Cosby	1,374	2.27
Independent	Robert H. "Hub" Bedwell	784	1.30
Total votes		60,456	100.00
Republican hold			

=== 2014 ===
2014 Knox County, Tennessee, mayoral election Republican primary
Party	Candidate	Votes	%
Republican	Tim Burchett (incumbent)	20,539	100.00
Total votes		20,539	100.00

2014 Knox County, Tennessee, mayoral election
Party	Candidate	Votes	%
Republican	Tim Burchett (incumbent)	48,062	100.00
Total votes		48,062	100.00
Republican hold			

=== 2018 ===
2018 Tennessee's 2nd congressional district Republican primary
Party	Candidate	Votes	%
Republican	Tim Burchett	47,875	48.19
Republican	Jimmy Matlock	35,855	36.09
Republican	Sarah Ashley Nickloes	10,961	11.03
Republican	Jason Frederick Emert	2,305	2.32
Republican	Hank Hamblin	855	0.86
Republican	Vito Sagliano	844	0.85
Republican	C. David Stansberry	657	0.66
Total votes		99,352	100.00

2018 Tennessee's 2nd congressional district election
Party	Candidate	Votes	%
Republican	Tim Burchett	172,856	65.94
Democratic	Renee Hoyos	86,668	33.06
Independent	Greg Samples	967	0.37
Independent	Jeffrey A. Grunau	657	0.25
Independent	Marc Whitmire	637	0.24
Independent	Keith A. LaTorre	349	0.13
Total votes		262,134	100.00
Republican hold			

=== 2020 ===
2020 Tennessee's 2nd congressional district Republican primary
Party	Candidate	Votes	%
Republican	Tim Burchett (incumbent)	78,990	100.00
Total votes		78,990	100.00

2020 Tennessee's 2nd congressional district election
Party	Candidate	Votes	%
Republican	Tim Burchett (incumbent)	238,907	67.64
Democratic	Renee Hoyos	109,684	31.05
Independent	Matthew L. Campbell	4,592	1.30
Write-In	Ronald Cornell Jr.	7	0.00
Write-In	David Dockery	7	0.00
Total votes		353,197	100.00
Republican hold			

=== 2022 ===
2022 Tennessee's 2nd congressional district Republican primary
Party	Candidate	Votes	%
Republican	Tim Burchett (incumbent)	56,880	100.00
Total votes		56,880	100.00

2022 Tennessee's 2nd congressional district election
Party	Candidate	Votes	%
Republican	Tim Burchett (incumbent)	141,089	67.91
Democratic	Mark Harmon	66,673	32.09
Total votes		207,762	100.00
Republican hold			

=== 2024 ===
2024 Tennessee's 2nd congressional district Republican primary
Party	Candidate	Votes	%
Republican	Tim Burchett (incumbent)	54,617	100.00
Total votes		54,617	100.00

2024 Tennessee's 2nd congressional district election
Party	Candidate	Votes	%
Republican	Tim Burchett (incumbent)	250,750	69.26
Democratic	Jane George	111,316	30.74
Total votes		362,066	100.00
Republican hold			

== Personal life ==
Burchett is a Presbyterian. He married Allison Beaver in June 2008, at an impromptu ceremony conducted by Tennessee governor Phil Bredesen. Beaver filed for divorce in April 2012, citing "irreconcilable differences". The divorce was finalized later that year. Burchett married Kelly Kimball in 2014, and later became a legal guardian to Kimball's daughter, who is homeschooled.

He maintains a hobby building skateboards out of bamboo, having spent years since high school working with the material, and has built over ten, including some longboards. Burchett keeps horses on his farm. In 2025, he was kicked by a horse and suffered a broken rib and bruising. In 2022, his daughter sustained serious injuries in a horse-related accident.

Political offices
Preceded by Mike Ragsdale	Mayor of Knox County; 2010–2018	Succeeded by Glenn Jacobs
U.S. House of Representatives
Preceded by Jimmy Duncan	Member of the U.S. House of Representatives from Tennessee's 2nd congressional district 2019–present	Incumbent
U.S. order of precedence (ceremonial)
Preceded by Jim Baird	United States representatives by seniority 190th	Succeeded by Sean Casten
