= Tennessee House of Representatives 21st district =

State legislative district in Tennessee

Tennessee's 21st State House of Representatives district
- Map of Tennessee House districts, with the 21st District shaded in red
Representative
Lowell Russell; R–Vonore
- Demographics: 90.1% White; 1.8% Black; 3.6% Hispanic; 0.5% Asian; 1.7% Other
- Population: 66,465

The Tennessee House of Representatives 21st district is one of 99 legislative districts included in the lower house of the Tennessee General Assembly. It covers the northern and central portions of Monroe County, such as Vonore, Madisonville, and Sweetwater; and the southern and central portions of Loudon County, such as Greenback, Philadelphia, and Loudon. The district has been represented by Lowell Russell, since 2019.

== Demographics ==
- 90.1% of the district is White
- 1.8% of the district is African American
- 3.6% of the district is Hispanic Americans
- 0.5% of the district is Asian-American
- 1.5% of the district is two or more races
- 0.2% of district is some other race alone

== List of Representatives ==
Representatives	Party	Years of Service	General Assembly	Residence
Douglas Gunnels	Republican	1989-2001	96th-101st	Greenback
Russell Johnson	Republican	2001-2005	102nd-103rd	Loudon
Harry W. Wampler	Republican	2005 - 2007	104th	Lenoir City
Jimmy Matlock	Republican	2007 - 2019	105th-110th	Lenoir City
Lowell Russell	Republican	January 8, 2019 – present	111th-114th	Vonore

== Electoral History ==
=== 2022 ===
2022 Tennessee House of Representatives 21st district election
Party	Candidate	Votes	%
Republican	Lowell Russell	18,438	100%
Total votes		18,438	100%
Republican hold			

=== 2020 ===
2020 Tennessee House of Representatives 21st district election
Party	Candidate	Votes	%
Republican	Lowell Russell	29,224	100%
Total votes		29,224	100%
Republican hold			
