= Peace Is Possible =

2006 book by S. Daniel Abraham

Peace is Possible
- Hardcover Edition book cover
- Author: S. Daniel Abraham; Bill Clinton, foreword
- Language: English
- Subject: Arab–Israeli conflict
- Genre: non-fiction
- Publisher: Newmarket Press
- Publication date: 2006
- Publication place: United States
- Media type: Hardcover
- Pages: 240
- ISBN: 1-55704-702-2
- OCLC: 62127834
- Dewey Decimal: 956.05/3 22
- LC Class: DS119.76 .A3482 2006

Peace Is Possible: Conversations with Arab and Israeli Leaders from 1988 to the Present is a book by S. Daniel Abraham, with a foreword by former U.S. President Bill Clinton. The book was released in hardcover format in 2006 by Newmarket Press.

The book is a first-hand account of Slim Fast founder Abraham's more than 15 years of peacemaking efforts in the Middle East, as well as the various reasons he believes peace is possible.

Hillary Clinton spoke about Abraham's book at Princeton University, while recognizing the creation of the "S. Daniel Abraham Visiting Professorship in Middle East Policy Studies" and its first holder, Daniel C. Kurtzer.

The book is utilized as a resource by Case Western Reserve University, and the United States Air Force utilizes other books by Abraham as part of Middle-East peace workshops.

With former congressman Wayne Owens, Abraham established the Center for Middle East Peace & Economic Cooperation. Abraham's work on peace is also featured as part of the Clinton Global Initiative.

== Statements by individuals involved in the peace process ==
President Bill Clinton

"When peace finally comes to the Middle East, it will be because of people like Dan Abraham"

Shimon Peres

"Dan Abraham's book is in a category apart. I do not know of any other "private diplomacy" that has done so much to foster the peace process. Dan Abraham and Wayne Owens have spanned the length and breadth of the Middle East with keen interest and a sense of mission. They generated a deep feeling of trust among the people they met and never abandoned hope even in the most difficult of times. As dramatic as their story may be, it nonetheless strikes us by its distinctive sincerity. Their account of it is related fairly and honestly. This is indeed a book that merits attention, also because of the surprises it enfolds." Shimon Peres

Elie Wiesel

"Whether utopian or realistic, Dan Abraham's obsession to bring peace between Israelis and Palestinians is remarkable. His behind-the-scenes encounters with various protagonists of this endless historical drama will help the reader understand its complexity as well as its need for a peaceful resolution."

Saeb Erekat

"Although I may agree or disagree with Danny Abraham's assessments, i recognize his commitment to a two state-solution in which Palestine and Israel coexist peacefully. His work, as reflected in this book, demonstrates his sustained efforts to promote peace, reconciliation, and an agreement to end the Israeli-Palestinian conflict. Abraham's approach also illustrates the potential role of creative thinking and track-two diplomacy in advancing the peace process."

Ehud Olmert

"Danny Abraham is one of those unique people who, without any formal appointment, have dedicated their lives to search for peace in our region. He has played an imperative role over the years and has a fascinating story to tell."

== Notable individuals interviewed by author ==
Arab leaders

- Hosni Mubarak
- Hafez al-Assad
- Crown Prince Abdullah
- Yasser Arafat

Israeli prime ministers

- Yitzhak Shamir
- Yitzhak Rabin
- Shimon Peres
- Ehud Barak
- Ariel Sharon
