= Anna Westin Act =

Anna Westin Act of 2015
- Long title: To amend the Public Health Service Act with respect to eating disorders, and for other purposes.
- Enacted by: the 117th United States Congress
- Announced in: the 114th United States Congress
- Sponsored by: Ted Deutch

Legislative history
- Signed into law by President Joe Biden on December 28, 2022

The Anna Westin Act of 2015 (H.R. 2515, S. 1865), later the Anna Westin Legacy Act of 2022, is a bill which is aimed at training school officials and healthcare professionals on how to identify those with eating disorders and on how to intervene. 30 million Americans suffer from eating disorders. Eating disorders have the highest mortality rate out of any mental illness and affects women 2.5 times more than men. Additionally, eating disorders research to improve identification and treatment is limited. Eating disorder research receives some of the lowest amounts of research funding compared to all other diseases at $30 research dollars per person affected versus $188 research dollars for Autism and $682 research dollars for Breast Cancer.

On May 21, 2015, Congressman Ted Deutch (D-FL-21) and Congresswoman Ileana Ros-Lehtinen (R-FL-27) introduced the bill in the House of Representatives. On July 27, 2015, Senator Amy Klobuchar (D-MN) and Senator Kelly Ayotte (R-NH) introduced the bill in the Senate with support and leadership from Senators Tammy Baldwin (D-WI) and Shelley Moore Capito (R-WV).

On 28th December 2022, the Anna Westin Legacy Act of 2022 was signed into law by President Joe Biden as part of a comprehensive year end spending package.

== About ==
The Anna Westin Act of 2015 is written to help those affected by eating disorders get the care they need by focusing on improved training and clarity of mental health parity. The bill is designed to have a zero CBO score. In addition, the House of Representatives version of the Anna Westin Act includes the truth in advertising act, a small inter-agency study looking at digitally altered images of humans as they related to fair advertising practices. The three components of the bill are as follows:

- Training: The Anna Westin Act of 2015 will help prevent eating disorders by using existing NIMH and SAMHSA funds to provide training for health professionals and school personnel to identify eating disorders and intervene early when precursory symptoms and behaviors arise.
- Clarity of Mental Health Parity: The Anna Westin Act of 2015 aims to provide better health insurance treatment coverage for those affected by eating disorders. The legislation clarifies the intent of former Congressman Jim Ramstad (R-MN) and former Congressman Patrick Kennedy (D-RI) to include residential treatment services in their past bipartisan legislation, the Paul Wellstone and Pete Domenici Mental Health Parity and Addiction Equity Act of 2008 (the Parity Law), which required insurance providers to cover people with mental illness equally as those with other health issues.
- Truth in Advertising: The House bill (H.R. 2515) requires the Federal Trade Commission to conduct a small inter-agency study and report on digitally altered images of humans and fair advertising practices.

== History ==
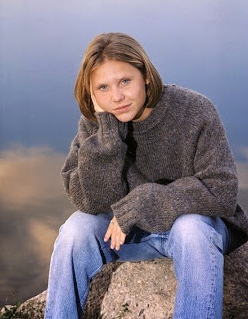
Anna Westin

The Anna Westin Act of 2015 received its name in observance of 21-year-old Anna Westin. Anna grew up living with her mother, father and sisters in the small town of Chaska, Minnesota. When Anna was 16, she developed anorexia. Anna received outpatient treatment for her eating disorder and Anna and her family thought her treatment was successful. Unfortunately, when Anna returned from college her sophomore year, her parents realized she had relapsed and was suffering from severe anorexia. Anna's family took her to the doctor and Anna was told she needed to be hospitalized. When Anna went to be admitted to the hospital, Anna's insurer refused to cover inpatient treatment. Shortly thereafter, on February 17, 2000, Anna died from suicide as a direct result of her battle with anorexia.

Kitty Westin, Anna's mother, established Minnesota's The Anna Westin Foundation (now The Emily Program Foundation) and other resources to help people experiencing eating disorders.
