= Robert Wexler =

American politician (born 1961)

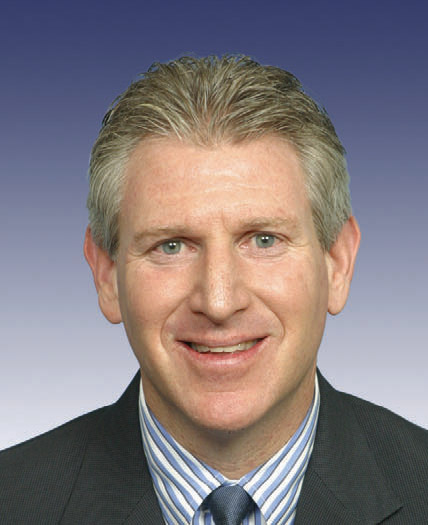

Member of the U.S. House of Representatives from Florida's 19th district
- In office January 3, 1997 – January 3, 2010
- Preceded by: Harry Johnston
- Succeeded by: Ted Deutch

Member of the Florida Senate from the 28th district
- In office November 6, 1990 – November 5, 1996
- Preceded by: Don Childers
- Succeeded by: Ron Klein

Personal details
- Born: Robert Ira Wexler; January 2, 1961 (age 65) New York City, New York, U.S.
- Party: Democratic
- Spouse: Laurie Cohen
- Children: 3
- Education: Emory University; University of Florida (BA); George Washington University (JD)

Robert Ira Wexler (born January 2, 1961) is an American politician and lawyer from Florida. He is the president of the Washington-based S. Daniel Abraham Center for Middle East Peace. Wexler was a Democratic member of the U.S. House of Representatives, representing Florida's 19th congressional district, from 1997 until his resignation on January 3, 2010.

== Early life ==
Wexler was born in Queens, New York to Ben and Sandra Wexler. He and his family moved to South Florida when he was ten. Wexler graduated from Hollywood Hills High School in Hollywood, Florida and later attended Emory University for a year. He transferred to the University of Florida, where he received his Bachelor of Arts degree in political science in 1982. Wexler received his J.D. degree from The George Washington University Law School in 1985 and was a lawyer in private practice with Shutts & Bowen before serving in the House.

== Political career ==
Wexler served in the Florida Senate from 1990 to 1996 before being elected to the U.S. House of Representatives in the 1996 election, filling the open seat vacated by fellow Democrat Harry Johnston. He has been reelected six times, never facing serious opposition in one of the most Democratic districts in Florida. On January 3, 2010, he resigned to become executive director of the Center for Middle East Peace and Economic Cooperation, a Washington-based think tank.

=== Matzoh pricing ===
In April 1997, Wexler asked that an investigation be started to determine why the price of matzoh, the unleavened bread that is a staple at Jewish tables during Passover, varied so much throughout the country. "It's the biggest thing since the Jewish people escaped from Pharaoh and Egypt", Wexler said while also advising his constituents to "Get your family and friends to buy five-pound boxes in the Bronx and FedEx it down here."

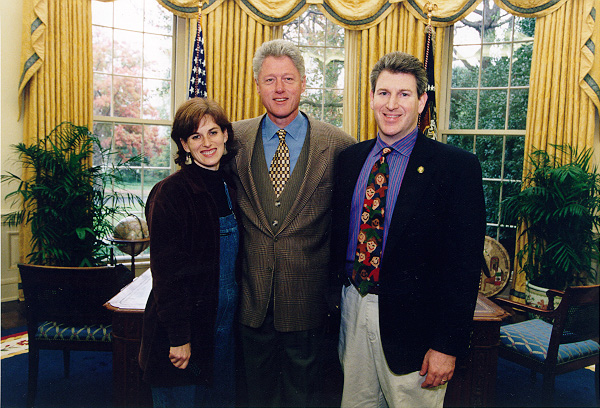
Robert and Laurie Wexler with President Bill Clinton in the Oval Office

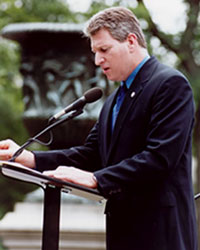
Rep. Robert Wexler

=== Wexler announces support for impeachment hearings ===
In an e-mail to supporters on November 7, 2007, Representative Robert Wexler, a member of the House Judiciary Committee, stated about H.Res. 333:

I will urge the Judiciary Committee to schedule impeachment hearings immediately and not let this issue languish as it has over the last six months. Only through hearings can we bring begin to correct the abuses of Dick Cheney and the Bush Administration; and, if it is determined in these hearings that Vice President Cheney has committed High Crimes and Misdemeanors, he should be impeached and removed from office.

In mid December 2007, Congressman Wexler launched a website (Wexlerwantshearings.com) to promote his effort for impeachment hearings. The site included a YouTube video where he explained his position and a petition for like-minded people to sign. Wexler set a goal of getting 50,000 Americans to join his cause. In just two weeks, over 200,000 people signed the petition and over 70,000 people watched his YouTube video.

=== Call for McClellan testimony ===
After the release of the book What Happened by former White House Press Secretary Scott McClellan in June 2008, Wexler went on record as saying he would like McClellan to testify under oath about what Wexler depicted as crimes of the Bush administration. The Bush administration had claimed that such proceedings would be a violation of executive privilege. At the time, Wexler was a member of the House Judiciary Committee. Scott McClellan offered his testimony to the House Judiciary Committee on June 20, 2008.

=== Articles of impeachment ===
On June 10, 2008, Wexler co-sponsored and signed Dennis Kucinich's articles of impeachment for George W. Bush. He referred to the congressional oath of office saying it was the duty of Congress to act, and stated: "President Bush deliberately created a massive propaganda campaign to sell the war in Iraq to the American people and the charges detailed in this impeachment resolution indicate an unprecedented abuse of executive power." However, Democratic House Speaker Nancy Pelosi repeatedly said she would not support a resolution calling for Bush's impeachment, saying such a move was unlikely to succeed and would be divisive.

The House voted 251 to 166 to refer the impeachment resolution to the Judiciary Committee on July 25, 2008, where no further action was taken on it.

=== Residency dispute ===
In July 2008, Fox news host Bill O'Reilly revealed that Wexler claimed his mother-in-law's home in Delray Beach as his official residence (though he is listed on the House roll as "D-Boca Raton"), but lived in a Maryland suburb for most of the year. Edward J. Lynch, a Republican running for Wexler's congressional seat, researched Wexler's living arrangements and took his argument to the Fox News program. "The house he lists on his voter registration is his in-laws' house, in a gated 55-and-older community ... Legally, he can't move back with children under 18."

After Wexler was confronted about the allegation, he stated that his mother-in-law did own the house in Delray Beach. But he also said he stayed there when in Florida which, according to his office is, on average, about twice a month. As a Florida resident, Wexler did not pay personal income tax, and his vehicles were also registered in that state, despite his near-permanent residency in the Washington metropolitan area.

== Committee assignments and caucus memberships ==
- Committee on Foreign Affairs
  - Subcommittee on Europe (chairman)
  - Subcommittee on International Organizations, Human Rights, and Oversight
  - Subcommittee on the Middle East and South Asia
- Committee on the Judiciary
  - Subcommittee on Courts and Competition Policy

=== Caucus memberships ===
The following is a partial list of Wexler's congressional caucus memberships:

- Congressional Caucus on Global Road Safety (co-founder and co-chairman)
- Caucus on U.S.-Turkish Relations (co-founder)
- Taiwan Caucus (co-founder)
- Caucus on Intellectual Property Promotion and Piracy Prevention (co-founder/co-chairman)
- Indonesia Caucus (co-founder/co-chairman)
- Congressional Study Group on Turkey (co-chair)
- Congressional Progressive Caucus
- India Caucus
- Serbia Caucus

== Notable media appearances ==
=== Colbert Report interview ===
Congressman Wexler's multiple appearances on The Colbert Report have elevated him to status of being a bona fide "friend of the show." On the July 20, 2006, episode, during an interview for the segment Better Know a District, Wexler went along with Stephen Colbert's idea of making jokes about the use of cocaine. This arose from a discussion about Wexler's running re-election unopposed and therefore, impliedly, not having to choose his words as carefully as he otherwise would. Led by Stephen Colbert, he first repeated what Colbert had said, then completed with the following statements:

I enjoy cocaine because ... it's a fun thing to do. I enjoy the company of prostitutes for the following reasons: ... oh, because it's a fun thing to do. Much like cocaine. If you combine the two together, it's probably even more fun.

Good Morning America, The Today Show (the ABC and NBC morning shows), and Fox News aired edited versions of the segment. In response, on the July 25, 2006, episode of his show, Colbert castigated those shows for broadcasting edited versions of the interview in what he said was a misleading and negative light. He told his viewers to "vote Wexler, the man's got a sense of humor, unlike, evidently, journalists."

On November 7, 2006, Wexler returned to The Colbert Report during the show's "Midterm Midtacular" special and joked about what he said in the earlier interview. When Colbert asked him if he would "reach across the aisle" if the Democrats took back the House, he was cautious and joked that he learned from the last interview he had to watch what he said.

=== The Hill ===
In August and September 2006, Wexler and his office staff were featured on The Hill, a six-part documentary on the Sundance Channel.

=== Daily Show - Defunding of UNESCO ===
On the March 15, 2012 episode of The Daily Show, John Oliver interviewed Wexler, who defended the United States' cutting its funding to UNESCO, based upon a statute that prohibits funding of organizations which recognize Palestinian statehood. These cuts will result in the reduction or elimination of certain humanitarian programs administered by UNESCO. Wexler indicated that the cut in funding is necessary to "send a message" to organizations that support Palestinian statehood.

== Family ==
Wexler and his wife Laurie (née Cohen) have three children.

== Election results ==
Wexler ran unopposed in the 1998, 2004, and the 2006 elections.

Florida's 19th Congressional District Election, 1998
Party	Candidate	Votes	%
Democratic	Robert Wexler*		100.00

Florida's 19th Congressional District Election, 2000
Party	Candidate	Votes	%
Democratic	Robert Wexler*	171,080	72.12
Republican	Morris Kent Thompson	67,789	23.88
Total votes		238,869	100.00
Democratic hold			

Florida's 19th Congressional District Election, 2002
Party	Candidate	Votes	%
Democratic	Robert Wexler*	156,747	72.16
Republican	Jack Merkle	60,477	27.84
Total votes		217,224	100.00
Democratic hold			

Florida's 19th Congressional District Election, 2004
Party	Candidate	Votes	%
Democratic	Robert Wexler*		100.00
Total votes			100.00
Democratic hold			

Florida's 19th Congressional District Election, 2006
Party	Candidate	Votes	%
Democratic	Robert Wexler*		100.00
Total votes			100.00
Democratic hold			

Florida's 19th Congressional District Election, 2008
Party	Candidate	Votes	%
Democratic	Robert Wexler*	202,465	66.16
Republican	Edward Lynch	83,357	27.24
Independent	Benjamin Graber	20,214	6.61
Total votes		306,036	100.00
Democratic hold			

== See also ==
- List of Jewish members of the United States Congress

U.S. House of Representatives
Preceded by Harry Johnston	Member of the U.S. House of Representatives from Florida's 19th congressional district 1997–2010	Succeeded by Ted Deutch
U.S. order of precedence (ceremonial)
Preceded by Peter Deutsch as Former U.S. Representative	Order of precedence of the United States as Former U.S. Representative	Succeeded by Ted Deutch as Former U.S. Representative
