= 2010 Florida's 19th congressional district special election =

- April 13, 2010
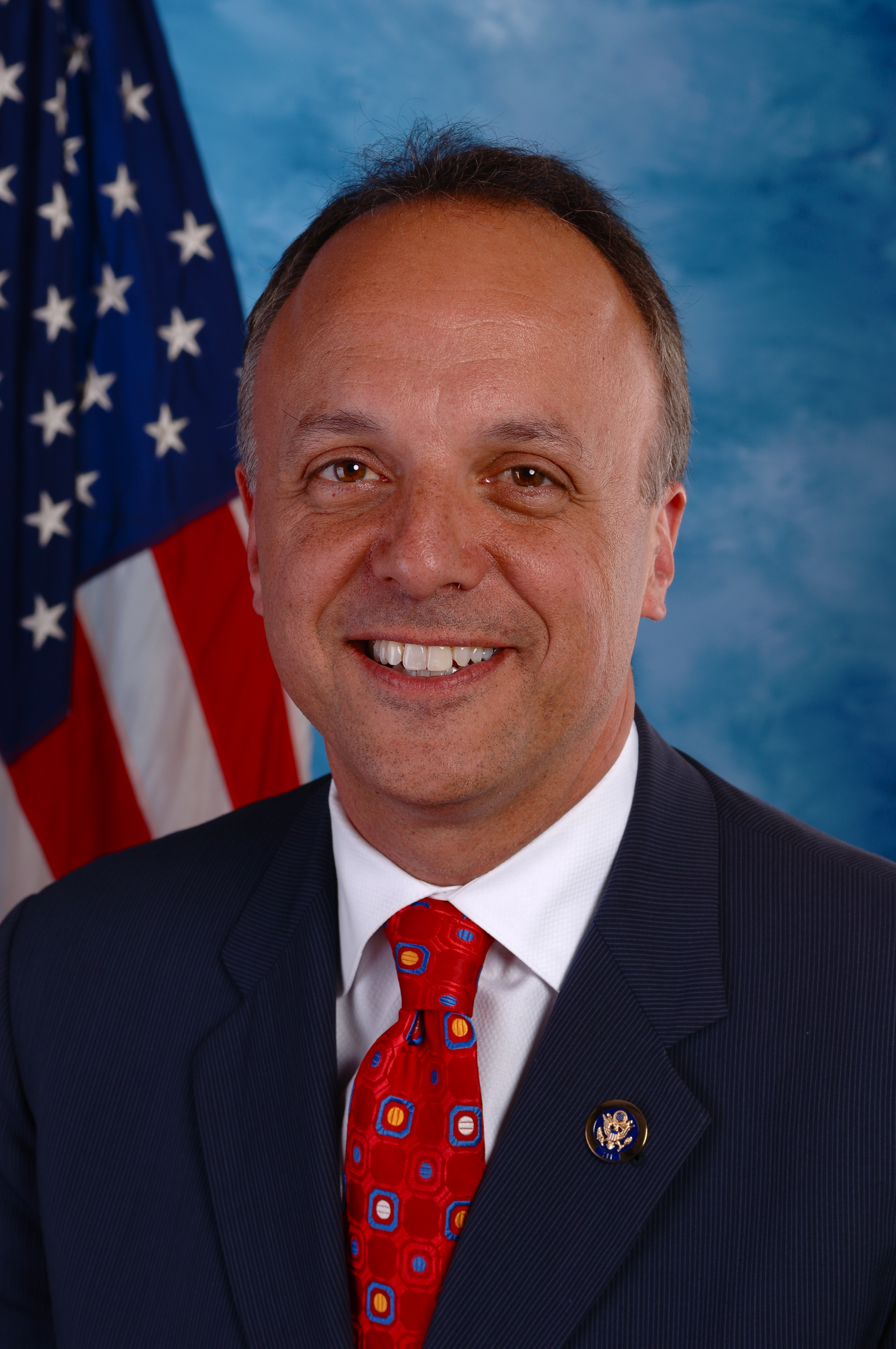

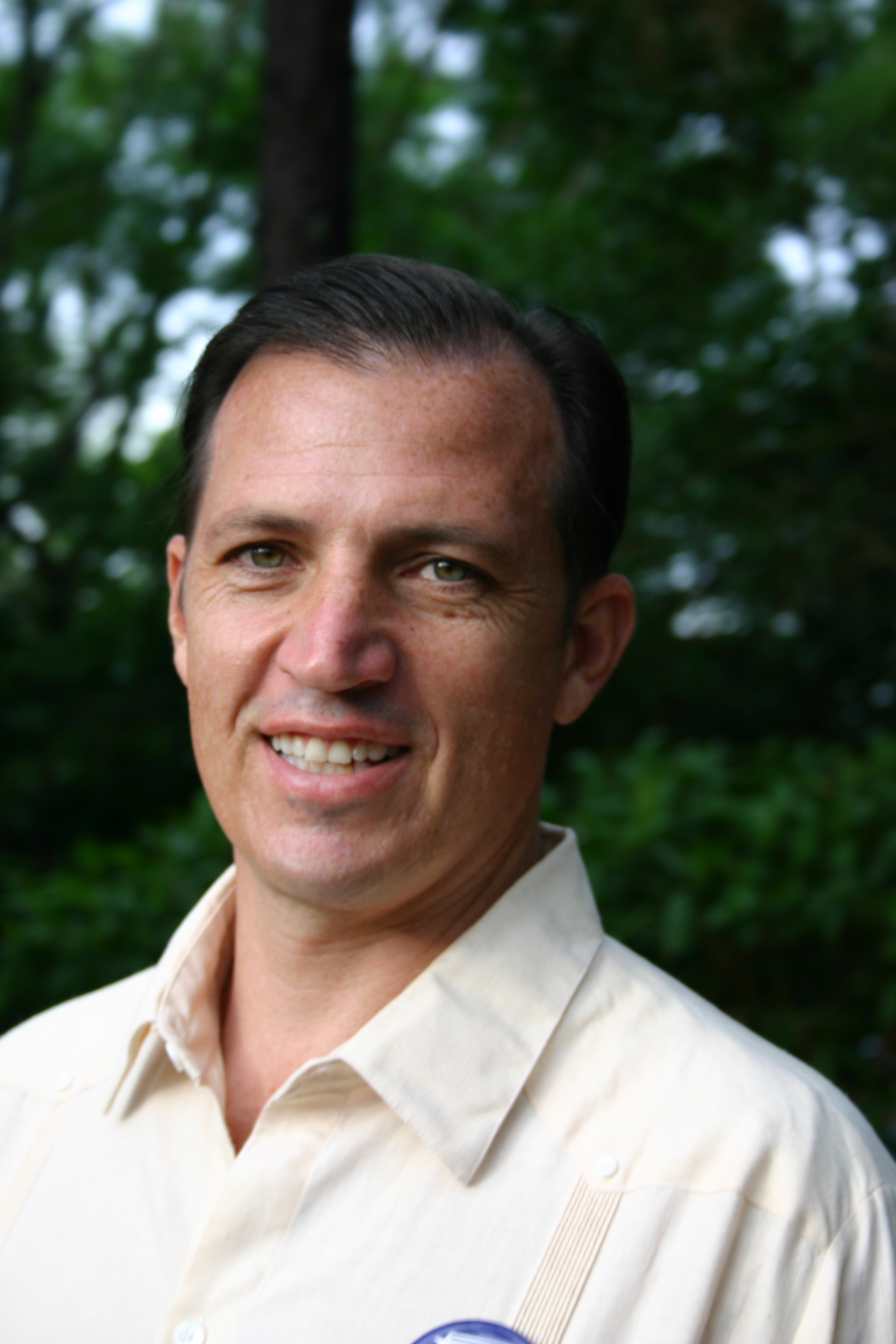
| Nominee | Ted Deutch | Edward Lynch |
| Party | Democratic | Republican |
| Popular vote | 43,255 | 24,539 |
| Percentage | 62.06% | 35.21% |
- County results Deutch: 50–60% 60–70%
Representative before election
Robert Wexler
Democratic
Elected Representative
Ted Deutch
Democratic

The 2010 special election for Florida's 19th congressional district took place on April 13, 2010, to fill the vacancy caused by Representative Robert Wexler's resignation. Wexler resigned on January 3, 2010, to become the President of the S. Daniel Abraham Center for Middle East Peace. Florida's 19th congressional district was a liberal-leaning district based in South Florida, stretching from Greenacres to Margate in Broward County and Palm Beach County.

The election was initially scheduled to occur on April 6, the last day of Passover. However, Lynch met with Governor Crist and expressed his concern that a significant portion of the Jewish population would not have an opportunity to vote and national Jewish advocacy groups, citing the schedule conflict and the high density of Jewish voters in the district, called for the election to be moved to a later date. Ultimately, then-Governor Charlie Crist called Lynch to inform him that he decided to move the election to April 13, 2010.

State Senator Ted Deutch, the Democratic nominee, easily defeated Edward Lynch, the Republican nominee, and was elected to a full term later in 2010.

== Democratic primary ==
=== Candidates ===
- Ted Deutch, State Senator
- Ben Graber, former Broward County Commissioner

=== Campaign ===
During the campaign, Graber, who had unsuccessfully run for this seat in 1996 and 2008, emphasized his progressive policies, favoring "universal health care and opposition to the wars in Afghanistan and Iraq." Deutch, meanwhile, focused on his "ability to get things done" in the Republican-dominated state legislature and his concern about the national security threat posed by Iran. Former Congressman Wexler, along with then-Congressmen Alcee Hastings, Ron Klein, and Debbie Wasserman Schultz, endorsed Deutch, who ended up winning the primary by a wide margin.

=== Results ===
Democratic primary results,
| Party | Candidate | Votes | % |
|---|---|---|---|
| Democratic | Ted Deutch | 23,959 | 85.23% |
| Democratic | Ben Graber | 4,151 | 14.77% |
| Total votes | | 28,110 | 100.00% |

== Republican primary ==
=== Candidates ===
- Edward Lynch, businessman
- Joe Budd, financial planner
- Curt Price, retired police officer

=== Campaign ===
During the campaign, Lynch and Budd each emphasized their commitment to the Tea Party movement, and attacked each other over their business practices and debts. Lynch was attacked for being accused of owing $1.4 million in back income taxes and previously registering to vote as a Democrat. He explained that he was audited over the sale of a business and that the matter has been resolved. With regard to registering as a democrat, he was automatically registered as a democrat when he received his driver's license. He explained that since he was not very active politically prior to running for office, he was unaware that the DMV automatically registered him through a system called "motor voter". Budd, meanwhile, was attacked for a $25,000 tax lien. By the end of the campaign, Price and Budd announced that they would not support Lynch in the general election if he won the primary. Ultimately, Lynch narrowly won the primary by just 48 votes, narrowly beating out Budd.

=== Results ===
Republican primary results
| Party | Candidate | Votes | % |
|---|---|---|---|
| Republican | Edward Lynch | 3,322 | 40.70% |
| Republican | Joe Budd | 3,274 | 40.11% |
| Republican | Curt Price | 1,566 | 19.19% |
| Total votes | | 8,162 | 100.00% |

== General election ==
=== Campaign ===
The general election campaign featured sharp distinctions between Deutch and Lynch. Lynch attacked the recently passed Affordable Care Act as a "government takeover" of healthcare, while Deutch said that he would have voted for the bill. McCormick, meanwhile, running as an independent candidate, argued that his lack of affiliation with either of the major parties would allow him to bring change. In the end, owing to the Democratic nature of the district, as well as Deutch's history of representing the area in the legislature, Deutch beat Lynch by 26.85% but by fewer votes than any prior candidate ever won by.

=== Results ===
Florida's 19th congressional district special election, 2010
| Party | Candidate | Votes | % |
|---|---|---|---|
| Democratic | Ted Deutch | 43,269 | 62.06 |
| Republican | Edward Lynch | 24,549 | 35.21 |
| Independent | Jim McCormick | 1,905 | 2.73 |
| Total votes | | 69,723 | 100.00 |
| Democratic hold | | | |

==== By county ====
| County | Ted Deutch Democratic | | Ed Lynch Republican | | Various candidates Other parties | | Margin | | Total |
| County | # | % | # | % | # | % | # | % | Total |
|---|---|---|---|---|---|---|---|---|---|
| Broward (part) | 7,352 | 53.85% | 5,843 | 42.80% | 458 | 3.35% | 1,509 | 11.05% | 13,653 |
| Palm Beach (part) | 35,917 | 63.54% | 18,706 | 33.09% | 1,905 | 3.37% | 17,211 | 30.45% | 56,528 |
| Totals | 43,269 | 62.06% | 24,549 | 35.21% | 1,905 | 2.73% | 18,720 | 26.85% | 69,723 |
