= Russell Johnson (disambiguation) =

Russell Johnson (1924–2014) was an American actor.

Russ or Russell Johnson may also refer to:

== Politicians ==
- Russell S. Johnson, American member of 113th New York State Legislature in 1890
- Russell Johnson (Tennessee politician) (born 1965), American legislator and district attorney in Tennessee

== Sportsmen ==
- Russell Conwell Johnson, 1894–1950), American baseball pitcher for Philadelphia Athletics, a/k/a Jing Johnson
- Russell Johnson (sport shooter) (1920–1991), American Virgin Islands competitor in 1976 Olympics
- Russ Johnson (born 1973), American baseball infielder
- Russell Johnson, American player on 2010–11 Robert Morris Colonials men's basketball team

== Others ==
- Russell Johnson (cartoonist) (1893–1995), American creator of six-decade comic strip Mr. Oswald
- Russell Johnson (acoustician) (1920–2007), American architect and acoustical expert
- Russell Maurice Johnson (born 1947), Canadian serial killer

== See also ==
- Russell Johnston (disambiguation)
