= Newmarket Press =

- Status: Defunct
- Founded: 1981
- Founder: Esther Margolis
- Successor: It Books (HarperCollins)
- Country of origin: United States
- Headquarters location: New York City
- Publication types: Books
- Official website: www.newmarketpress.com (defunct)

Newmarket Publishing and Communications Company, and its publishing arm Newmarket Press, was an American publishing label founded in 1981 by president and publisher Esther Margolis.

== History ==
Newmarket published about 20-30 mainly non-fiction books a year, primarily in the areas of childcare & parenting, film & performing arts, psychology, health & nutrition, biography, history, business & personal finance, and popular self-help & reference. It was acquired by HarperCollins' It Books in 2011. In 2014, Margolis left HarperCollins to start a new venture, regaining control of the Newmarket Press name and logo.

Newmarket's list included such popular and acclaimed books as the 2 million-copy bestselling What's Happening To My Body? series of puberty education books for boys and girls by Lynda Madaras; Suze Orman's You've Earned It, Don't Lose It; biographies of Condoleezza Rice and Buster Keaton; Daphne Oz's The Dorm Room Diet; Dr Georgia Witkin's The Female Stress Syndrome and The Male Stress Syndrome; Gene Hackman & Daniel Lenihan's first novel Wake of the Perdido Star; Stuart Avery Gold's international bestseller Ping: A Frog in Search of a New Pond; and Shalom, Friend: The Life and Legacy Of Yitzhak Rabin winner of the 1996 National Jewish Book Award in nonfiction.

In addition, Newmarket created a successful niche in publishing books on film, theater and performing arts. Its entertainment list included over 100 film books, tying into 301 Oscar nominations, and 96 Oscar wins. Newmarket Press was especially noted for the illustrated moviebooks on such films as The Matrix; Dreamgirls; X2 and X-Men: The Last Stand; Gladiator; Moulin Rouge!; Crouching Tiger, Hidden Dragon; Chicago; Sense and Sensibility; Saving Private Ryan; and Dances With Wolves; and for its acclaimed Newmarket Shooting Script Series, including screenplay books for Todd Field's Little Children, Paul Thomas Anderson's Magnolia, Steven Soderbergh's Traffic and Erin Brockovich, Little Miss Sunshine, Alexander Payne's Sideways, Charlie Kaufman's Eternal Sunshine of the Spotless Mind, Allan Ball's American Beauty, and Frank Darabont's The Shawshank Redemption, among others.

== Leadership ==
Esther Margolis is an American publisher who served as president and majority owner of Newmarket Publishing and Communications and Newmarket Press, which she founded. Prior to Newmarket, Margolis spent 17 years at Bantam Books where she served as its first senior vice president for marketing, publicity and communications. Margolis was born in Detroit, Michigan. She earned her B.A. in Education and M.A. in English from the University of Michigan. She was married to Dr. Stanley Fisher—a psychologist and the author of Discovering The Power of Self-Hypnosis—until his death in 2009. Margolis currently resides in both New York City and Amagansett, Long Island.

== See also ==
- Peace is Possible, by S. Daniel Abraham with foreword by President Bill Clinton
