= Justin Lafferty =

American politician (born 1971)

Member of the Tennessee House of Representatives from the 89th district
- Incumbent
- Assumed office January 8, 2019
- Preceded by: Roger Kane

Personal details
- Born: Justin Augustus Lafferty; May 13, 1971 (age 55)
- Party: Republican
- Children: 1
- Education: Pellissippi State Community College; University of Tennessee (BS)
- Website: House website Campaign website

Justin Augustus Lafferty (born May 13, 1971) is an American politician from the state of Tennessee. A Republican, Lafferty has represented the 89th district of the Tennessee House of Representatives, based in the western suburbs of Knoxville, since 2019.

== Career ==
In 2018, Roger Kane announced his retirement from the 89th district of the Tennessee House of Representatives, and a crowded field formed to replace him. Lafferty, a stay-at-home father and a landlord, was considered a significant underdog against several of his competitors, including former Knox County sheriff Tim Hutchison and former state senator Stacey Campfield. However, Lafferty outpolled both to win the primary with just over 30% of the vote. In the strongly Republican suburban seat, Lafferty went on to soundly win the general election over Democrat Coleen Martinez, 64-36%.

On May 4, 2021, Lafferty made a speech on the Tennessee House floor in defense of the Three-fifths Compromise, a provision of the original U.S. Constitution resulting from a 1787 agreement between northern and southern states, providing that three-fifths of a state's slave population would be counted for representation in the U.S. House of Representatives. The compromise is regarded as one of the most racist deals among the states during the country's founding. Lafferty inaccurately claimed in his speech that the three-fifths compromise was adopted for "the purpose of ending slavery."

In 2023, Lafferty supported resolutions to expel three Democratic lawmakers from the legislature for violating decorum rules.

== Personal life ==
Lafferty lives in Knoxville with his wife and daughter.
