= Lowell Russell =

American politician (born 1975)

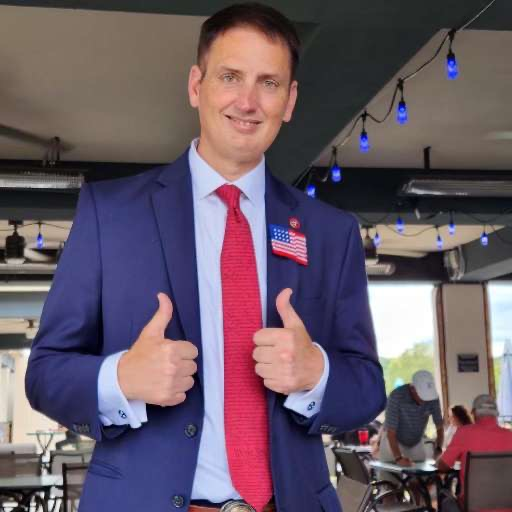

Member of the Tennessee House of Representatives from the 21st district
- Incumbent
- Assumed office January 8, 2019
- Preceded by: Jimmy Matlock

Personal details
- Born: Larry Lowell Russell; August 25, 1975 (age 51)
- Party: Republican
- Education: Roane State Community College (AS)

Larry Lowell Russell (born August 25, 1975) is a Republican member of the Tennessee House of Representatives for the 21st district, encompassing parts of Loudon County and Monroe County.

== Biography ==
Lowell Russell was born on August 25, 1975, in Maryville, Tennessee. Lowell is the son of Larry Rex Russell and Shirley Geneva Shaw. He has one brother, Cory Alan Russell. Lowell attended Roane State Community College where he obtained his criminal justice degree. Lowell also attended the Tennessee Bureau of Investigation Academy, the Tennessee Highway Patrol Academy and basic police academy at Cleveland State Community College. He currently lives in the Corntassel Community located in Vonore, Tennessee.

In 2012, while working as a trooper for the Tennessee Highway Patrol, Russell was nearly killed when his cruiser was struck by a truck while stopped on the shoulder of the interstate.

In 2023, Russell supported a resolution to expel two of three Democratic lawmakers from the legislature for violating decorum rules. The expulsion was widely characterized as unprecedented.

Additionally, Russell wrote, sponsored through the committee process, and ultimately passed the following bills into law:

HB0289 As enacted, requires a sentence of death to be carried out within 30 business days of the conclusion of any appeals or post-conviction relief, if the jury unanimously determines that certain circumstances are met. - Amending TCA Title 39 and Title 40.

HB2590 As enacted, makes bullying and cyber-bullying offenses subject to the same penalties as harassment; requires an officer to make a report of bullying and notify a parent or guardian when victim is a minor. - Amending TCA Title 37; Title 38; Title 39 and Title 49.
