= Tennessee House of Representatives 89th district =

State legislative district in Tennessee

Tennessee's 89th State House of Representatives district
- Map of Tennessee House districts with the 89th District shaded in red
Representative
Justin Lafferty; R–Knoxville
since 2019
- Demographics: 81.4% White; 4.4% Black; 6.2% Hispanic; 2.8% Asian; 4.4% Multiracial
- Population (2024): 72,790

The Tennessee House of Representatives 89th district is one of the 99 legislative districts in the lower house of the Tennessee General Assembly. The district is located in East Tennessee and covers northwestern Knox County. It is made up of outlying suburbs and exurbs of, as well as small incorporated areas of Knoxville. It includes areas such as Norwood, Karns, Ball Camp, and Hardin Valley. Justin Lafferty has represented the district since 2019.

== Demographics ==
The Tennessee Comptroller estimates the population as of 2024 at 72,790.

- 81.4% of the district is White
- 6.2% of the district is Hispanic
- 4.4% of the district is Black
- 2.8% of the district is Asian
- 4.4% of the district is Two or more races

Detailed demographic information is also available through Census Reporter.

== History ==
The 88th Tennessee General Assembly was the first in which all districts were numbered. The 89th district was in Shelby County at this time.Since the 108th General Assembly, district 88 has been part of Knox County.

== List of Representatives ==
Representative	Party	Years of Service	General Assembly	Hometown
Justin Lafferty	Republican	2019 - present	111th-114th	Knoxville
Roger Kane	Republican	2013-2018	108th-110th	Knoxville
Jeanne Richardson	Democratic	2007-2012	105th-107th	Memphis
Beverly Marrero	Democratic	2003-2006	103rd-104th	Memphis
Carol Chumney	Democratic	1991-2002	97th-102nd	Memphis
Pamela Gaia	Democratic	1975-1990	89th-96th	Memphis
Doy L. Daniels Jr.	Democratic	1973-1974	88th	Memphis
