= Russell Johnston (disambiguation) =

Russell Johnston (1932–2008) was a Scottish politician.

Russell Johnston(e) may also refer to:

- Russell Johnston (footballer) (born 1960), Australian former VFL- and SANFL player
- Russell Irvin Johnston, creator of Double-elimination tournament

== See also ==
- Russell Johnson (disambiguation)
