= Russell Johnson (Tennessee politician) =

American politician and lawyer (born 1965)

Member of the Tennessee House of Representatives from the 21st district
- In office January 9, 2001 – January 9, 2007
- Preceded by: Douglas Gunnels
- Succeeded by: Jimmy Matlock

Tennessee State District Attorney from the 9th district
- Incumbent
- Assumed office 2006

Personal details
- Born: January 8, 1965 (age 61) Pulaski, Virginia, U.S.
- Party: Republican
- Education: Auburn University (BA); University of Tennessee (JD)

Russell Johnson (born January 8, 1965) is an American politician and lawyer from Tennessee. He served as a member of the Tennessee House of Representatives, from 2001 until 2007. He currently serves as a Tennessee state district attorney, being elected in 2006.

== Early life, education, and pre-political career ==
Johnson was born in Pulaski, Virginia to Lawrence and Martha Russell Johnson, who were both teachers. He attended Lebanon High School in Lebanon, Virginia. Inspired by his uncle, he decided that he wanted to become a lawyer. While in high school, he had the opportunity to shadow a local attorney. He attended Auburn University, Hiwassee College, and later the University of Tennessee, where he would receive his juris-doctor. In 1990, he opened a private practice in Loudon County. From 1998 until 2006, he was a judge for the city of Loudon.

== Tennessee House of Representatives (2001-2007) ==
In 2000, Johnson ran for the 21st district seat, in the Tennessee House of Representatives, to succeed the outgoing Doug Gunnels. He ran unopposed in the general election, receiving 100% of the vote. From 2004 until 2006, he was the chairman of the House Judiciary Subcommittee and a member of the House Conservation and Environment Committee.

In 2004, Johnson won a third term with nearly 86% of the vote, against independent challenger Stewart Rogers.

== Tennessee State District Attorney General (2007-present) ==
In 2006, Johnson ran for Tennessee State District Attorney General, in the 9th district, which encompasses Loudon, Meigs, Morgan, and Roane counties. He currently continues to serve as the district attorney general. Under Johnson as district attorney general, the offices in the district have started programs to address mental health, domestic violence, and drug abuse. Like many other district attorneys' offices in Tennessee, Johnson's office focuses primarily on victims' services, fentanyl and drug awareness, elder abuse, and opioid abuse, among many other topics.

== Honors and awards ==
Johnson has received the following awards and honors:

- American Jurisprudence Award
- 2003 - 2004, Tennessee Conservation Voters Top House Honoree
- 2003 - County Officials of Tennessee Outstanding Representative of the Year
- 2004 - Tennessee Wildlife Resources Agency Honoree

== Personal life ==
Johnson lives in Loudon and is married with children. He is a Methodist.
