= Richard Briggs =

American politician (born 1952)

Member of the Tennessee Senate from the 7th district
- Incumbent
- Assumed office January 13, 2015
- Preceded by: Stacey Campfield

Personal details
- Born: December 7, 1952 (age 73) Knoxville, Tennessee, U.S.
- Party: Republican
- Education: University of Kentucky (MD)

Richard Briggs (born December 7, 1952) is a Republican member of the Tennessee Senate representing the 7th district, which encompasses part of Knox County.

== Early life ==
Richard Briggs was born on December 7, 1952. He received his M.D. from the University of Kentucky College of Medicine. He is a cardiothoracic surgeon. He completed a surgical residency and cardiothoracic fellowship at Brooke Army Medical Center. While in the U.S. Army, he served in Operation Desert Storm and later Afghanistan and Iraq as a trauma surgeon. He retired with the rank of colonel.

== Career ==
Briggs was elected to the 109th General Assembly. He is currently Chairman of the Senate State and Local Government Committee. He serves as a member of the Senate Rules Committee and Senate Transportation & Safety Committee.

In 2018, Briggs introduced a bill to prohibit adults in Tennessee from smoking in a car with children present, but the bill did not advance in the state Senate.

In 2019, Briggs voted for a "trigger law" to make abortion illegal if the Supreme Court would ever overturn the right to abortion. After an abortion ban went into effect in Tennessee, Briggs worked to loosen the ban on the ground that it did not provide adequate exceptions to protect patients with medically complicated pregnancies. He authored bills that provided a clearer medical exception and protected doctors who treated patients with complicated pregnancies. Briggs subsequently faced a Republican primary challenge from an opponent who opposed Briggs' proposal.

In 2020, Donald Trump sought to overturn the results of that year's presidential election, which Trump lost to Joe Biden. Twenty-four of the 27 Republicans in the Tennessee Senate signed a letter supporting Trump's attempt to subvert the election and remain in power; Briggs (along with Brian Kelsey and Todd Gardenhire) were the only three Republicans who did not sign the letter.

In 2026, Briggs supported changes to Tennessee's school library ban law (the "Age-Appropriate Materials Act"), which was enacted in 2022 and amended in 2024. Under that law (the "Age-Appropriate Materials Act"), books could be removed from school library shelves by local school districts committees, with no public record of the complaint and no clear appeals procedure. B After controversies involving book bans in the Knox County Schools, Briggs spoke against the removal of works such as Alex Haley's Roots and The Kite Runner from school library collections. Briggs worked with Democratic state representative Sam McKenzie to draft an amendment to the law to limit complaints about books to parents, teachers and district employees, rather than outsiders, and to add a clear appeal process when a book was removed.

== Personal life ==
Briggs has a wife, Stephanie. He is a Methodist.
