= Ted Deutch =

American politician and attorney (born 1966)

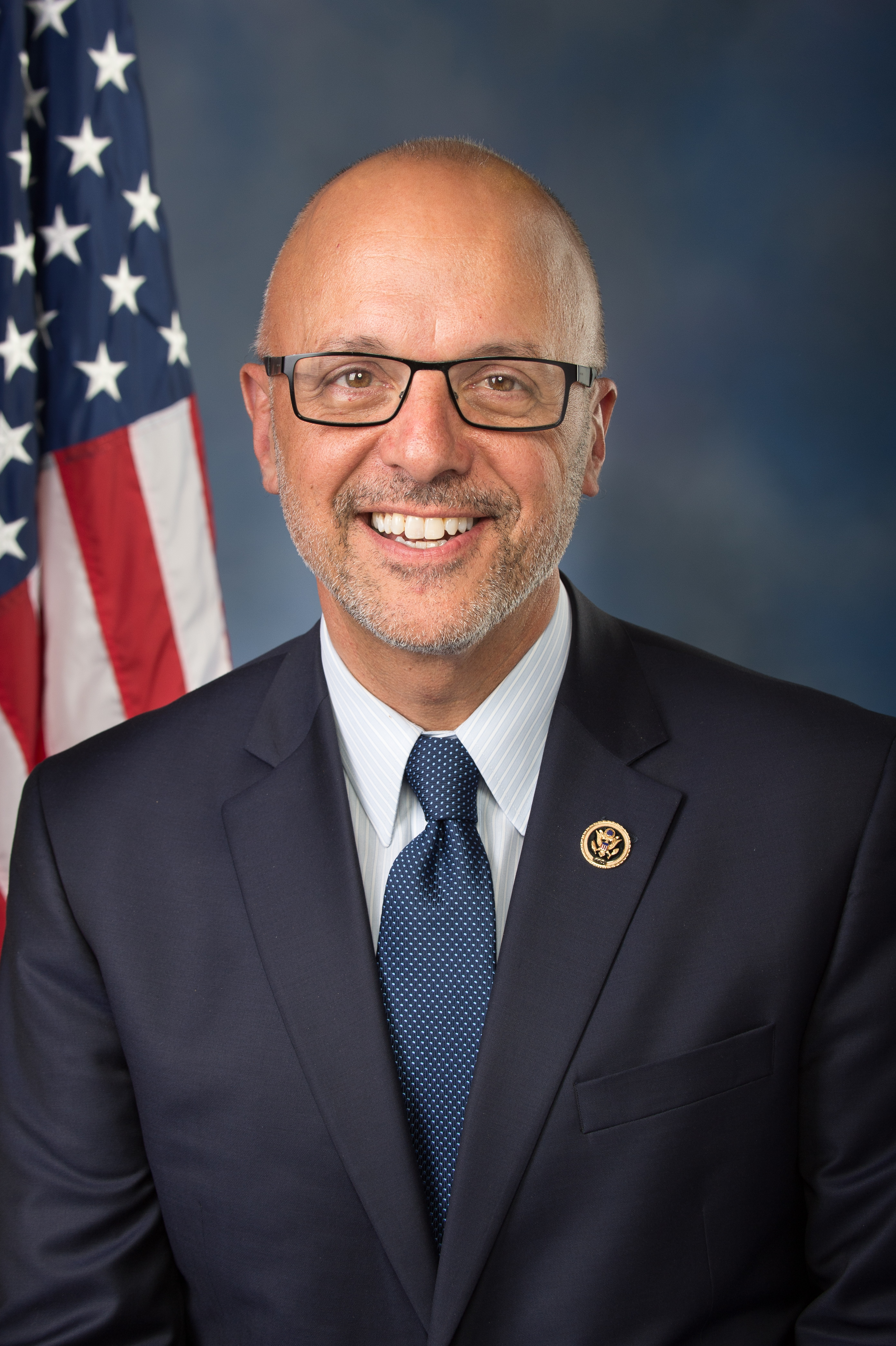
- Official portrait, 2016

CEO of the American Jewish Committee
- Incumbent
- Assumed office October 1, 2022
- Preceded by: David Harris

Chair of the House Ethics Committee
- In office January 3, 2019 – September 30, 2022
- Preceded by: Susan Brooks
- Succeeded by: Susan Wild

Member of the U.S. House of Representatives from Florida
- In office April 15, 2010 – September 30, 2022
- Preceded by: Robert Wexler
- Succeeded by: Jared Moskowitz
- Constituency: 19th district (2010–2013); 21st district (2013–2017); 22nd district (2017–2022)

Member of the Florida Senate from the 30th district
- In office November 7, 2006 – April 13, 2010
- Preceded by: Ron Klein
- Succeeded by: Maria Sachs

Personal details
- Born: Theodore Eliot Deutch; May 7, 1966 (age 60) Bethlehem, Pennsylvania, U.S.
- Party: Democratic
- Spouse: Jill Weinstock (m. 1992)
- Children: 3
- Education: University of Michigan (BA, JD)
- Deutch's voice Deutch supporting the U.S.-Israel Cooperation Enhancement and Regional Security Act. Recorded July 23, 2019

Theodore Eliot Deutch (/dɔɪtʃ/ DOYTCH; born May 7, 1966) is an American lawyer and politician who served as the U.S. representative from Florida's 22nd congressional district from 2010 to 2022. His district, numbered as the 19th district from 2010 to 2013 and as the 21st from 2013 to 2017, included much of northern Broward County and southern Palm Beach County in South Florida. A member of the Democratic Party, he first entered Congress in 2010 after a special election following the resignation of Robert Wexler.

Deutch chaired the House Ethics Committee from 2019 until his resignation, a position in which he succeeded Susan Brooks. He served as the Florida state senator from the 30th district from 2006 to 2010.

On February 28, 2022, Deutch announced he would not seek reelection in the 2022 United States House of Representatives elections, instead taking a job as chief executive officer of the American Jewish Committee by October 1, 2022. On September 30, 2022, Deutch resigned from the House.

== Early life, education, and legal career ==
Deutch was born in Bethlehem, Pennsylvania, the son of Jean (née Mindlin) and the late Bernard Deutch. He is Jewish. His grandparents were Jewish immigrants from Belarus and Russia. A graduate of Liberty High School in Bethlehem, Deutch graduated from the University of Michigan, where he served as editor-in-chief of Consider magazine and was awarded the Harry S. Truman Scholarship. He received his J.D. degree from the University of Michigan Law School.

== Florida Senate ==
As a member of the National Young Leadership Cabinet of United Jewish Communities, Deutch organized over 2,500 people to march on Capitol Hill in Washington, D.C., to pressure Congress on a slate of issues affecting children and the elderly. At the end of his tenure in the state senate, Deutch served as vice chair of the Committee on Regulated Industries and the Policy and Steering Subcommittee of the Ways and Means Committee.

== U.S. House of Representatives ==
=== Elections ===
==== 2010 ====
Special

In late 2009, Deutch declared his candidacy in a special election to fill the 19th congressional district seat formerly held by Robert Wexler, who left Congress to lead the Center for Middle East Peace and Economic Cooperation. He won the Democratic primary with 85% of the vote, and on April 13, 2010, won the special election, defeating Republican Edward J. Lynch.

General

Deutch defeated Republican nominee Joe Budd and write-in candidate Stan Smilan.

==== 2012 ====
After Florida underwent redistricting in 2012, Deutch's district was renumbered as the 21st district. Deutch won the November 6 general election with no major-party opposition.

==== 2014 ====
In the general election, against write-in opposition, Deutch won with 99.6% of the vote.

==== 2016 ====
In December 2015, Florida underwent redistricting due to a Supreme Court ruling. Most of Deutch's territory became the 22nd district, and was pushed further into Broward County. In the process, it absorbed the portion of Broward County that had previously been in the neighboring 22nd district represented by Lois Frankel, which had been renumbered as the 21st. This came after the state supreme court suggested it was better to have only one district splitting the two counties. After the new lines were announced, Deutch announced he would run in the new 22nd. Although the new lines put his home near Boca Raton just inside the borders of the 21st, members of Congress are required only to live in the state they wish to represent. In a statement, Deutch stressed his longstanding ties to Broward County, which accounted for 80% of the reconfigured district. He had represented much of the Broward County portion of the district for a decade at the federal and state levels. The Sun Sentinel also noted that staying in a Broward-based district would increase Deutch's statewide and national profile by allowing him to advertise on Miami/Fort Lauderdale television.

==== 2018 ====
Deutch defeated Republican Nicolas Kimaz in the November 8, 2018, general election, 62% to 38%

=== Tenure ===
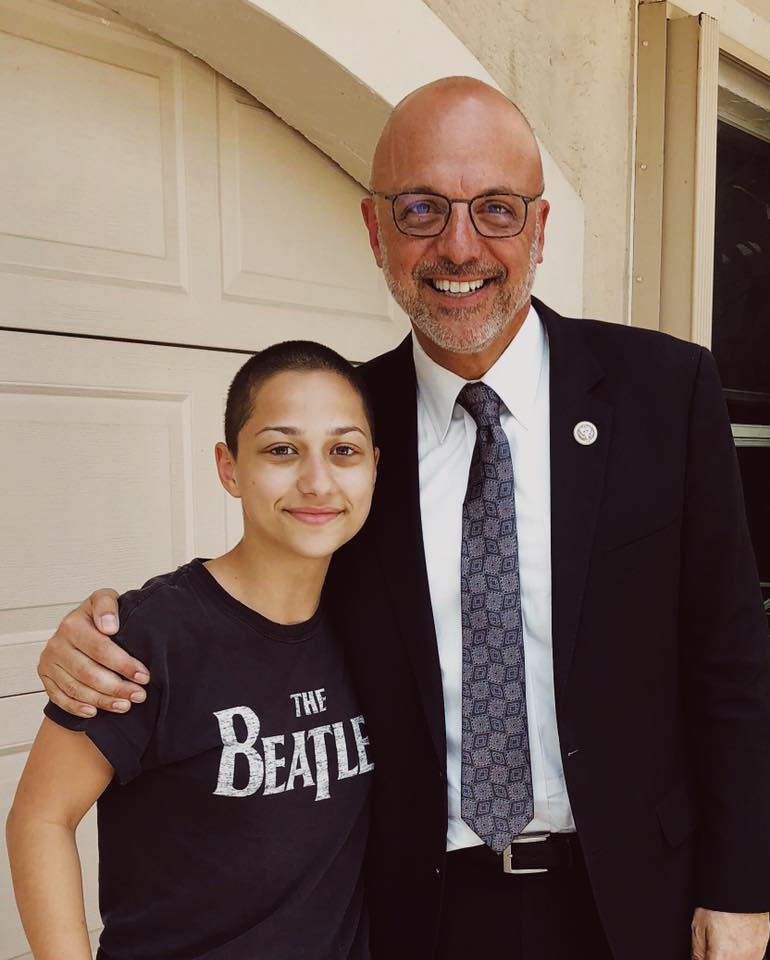
Deutch meets with X González on February 19, 2018.

Deutch was sworn in as a member of the United States House of Representatives on April 15, 2010.

In the wake of the Stoneman Douglas High School shooting, Deutch spoke out in favor of expanded gun control legislation. Stoneman Douglas is in his district. He spoke at a CNN town hall meeting and urged action. "A lot of people have told this community—people from all around the world—that it's too soon," he said. "It's too soon to get together to have this kind of forum. It's too soon to talk about preventing another tragedy like the one that struck our community from happening anywhere again. It's too soon to talk about getting weapons of war out of our communities. It is not too soon. It is too late for the 17 lives that were lost."

==== Legislative record ====
Shortly after his election, Deutch introduced the Preserving our Promise to Seniors Act, which aims to keep Social Security benefits in line with retirees' costs and gradually raises the cap on FICA taxes over a period of seven years.

During the 2011 debate on the debt ceiling, Deutch assembled and brought to the House floor an elaborate, game-show-style wheel to illustrate which government services he claimed would be endangered by a default on the national debt.

On November 19, 2011, Deutch introduced a resolution proposing "an amendment to the Constitution of the United States to expressly exclude for-profit corporations from the rights given to natural persons by the Constitution of the United States, prohibit corporate spending in all elections, and affirm the authority of Congress and the states to regulate corporations and to regulate and set limits on all election contributions and expenditures". Deutch's amendment is a blend of "ideas from "Move to Amend, Free Speech for People, Public Citizen, People For the American Way, Common Cause, and the Center for Media and Democracy".

In November 2018, Deutch and other members of Congress introduced legislation to enact a carbon tax within the Dividend the Energy Innovation and Carbon Dividend Act.

On December 18, 2019, Deutch voted to impeach President Donald Trump.

=== Committee assignments ===
- Committee on Foreign Affairs
  - Subcommittee on Europe, Energy, the Environment and Cyber
  - Subcommittee on the Middle East, North Africa and Global Counterterrorism (Chair)
- Committee on the Judiciary
  - Subcommittee on Courts, Intellectual Property, and the Internet
  - Subcommittee on Antitrust, Commercial and Administrative Law
- Committee on Ethics (chair)

=== Caucus memberships ===
- Congressional Arts Caucus
- Congressional Taiwan Caucus
- United States Congressional International Conservation Caucus
- Climate Solutions Caucus (co-chair)

== Political positions ==
Deutch voted with President Joe Biden's stated position 100% of the time in the 117th Congress, according to a FiveThirtyEight analysis.

=== Animal welfare ===
Along with Representative Vern Buchanan, Deutch authored the Preventing Animal Cruelty and Torture (PACT) Act, which made malicious animal cruelty a federal felony and authorized federal law enforcement agencies to prosecute animal cruelty cases. The PACT Act was signed into law in November 2019.

Deutch supports federal funding for the research and development of cultivated meat, which is produced without animal slaughter. In April 2021, Deutch led a letter by 20 members of Congress calling for the appropriation of $100 million in research funding for alternative proteins. In May 2021, he told the Breakthrough Institute that he supports funding alternative proteins through Congressional appropriations and the United States Department of Agriculture.

=== Environment ===
On November 28, 2018, Deutch introduced a carbon fee and dividend bill, the Energy Innovation and Carbon Dividend Act of 2018, saying, "this aggressive carbon pricing scheme introduced by members from both parties marks an important opportunity to begin to seriously address the immediate threat of climate change." After the bill died at the end of the 115th Congress, he reintroduced it as the Energy Innovation and Carbon Dividend Act of 2019, saying, "climate change is an urgent threat that demands urgent bipartisan action. With this legislation, we are making clear to our colleagues that bipartisanship is possible—even necessary—to address climate change in this Congress."

=== Gun policy ===
Deutch believes that limitations can be placed on the Second Amendment right to bear arms, saying, "the majority of people in this country now understand that there are limitations on the Second Amendment. You cannot own an automatic weapon. You cannot own a bazooka. And so there is no reason to continue to sell to people a weapon of war like this," referencing semi-automatic rifles.

During his tenure in Congress, Deutch has voted on several pieces of gun legislation. He voted against H. R. 38 (the Concealed Carry Reciprocity Act), which would enable concealed carry reciprocity among all states.

Deutch also voted against H. J. Res. 40, which ultimately passed and used the Congressional Review Act to block implementation of an Obama-era Amendment to the NICS Improvement Amendments Act of 2007 that was aimed at preventing the mentally infirm from legally purchasing firearms.

Deutch has an F rating from the NRA Political Victory Fund, indicating that it does not believe he adequately supports gun rights.

After the Stoneman Douglas High School shooting, Deutch endorsed several gun control measures. He cosponsored H. R. 5087, the Assault Weapons Ban of 2018, saying, "Americans don't own tanks or missiles; so why should our streets be flooded with weapons of war made for the sole purpose of killing people?"

Deutch also announced his support for H. R. 4909, the STOP School Violence Act of 2018. The STOP School Violence Act would allow grants to train school staff how to identify troubled students and intervene before crises. The grants could also be used for developing an anonymous reporting system for students to submit concerns, as well as improving the physical infrastructure of schools against attacks.

Deutch also supports universal background checks, banning bump stocks, raising the minimum age to buy a rifle to 21, and repealing the 1996 Dickey Amendment.

=== Israel / Palestine ===
On January 5, 2017, Deutch voted in favor of a House resolution condemning UN Security Council Resolution 2334, which condemned Israeli settlement building in the Palestinian territories as a violation of international law, saying, "it ignores Palestinian terrorism, incitement to violence, and payments to families of terrorists."

Deutch supported President Donald Trump's decision to recognize Jerusalem as Israel's capital, saying: "The president's decision today is a recognition of existing U.S. law that Jerusalem is the capital of Israel and that the U.S. embassy should ultimately be located in the capital."

Deutch identifies as a "proud Zionist who strongly defends [Congress's] close connection to Israel" and supports anti-BDS legislation, saying the movement is "rooted in the antisemitic belief that the only Jewish state in the world doesn’t have a right to exist."

Deutch accused fellow Democrat Rashida Tlaib of antisemitism after she cited Human Rights Watch in calling Israel an apartheid state on the House floor.

=== Nagorno-Karabakh conflict ===
On October 1, 2020, Deutch co-signed a letter to Secretary of State Mike Pompeo that condemned Azerbaijan’s offensive operations against the Armenian-populated enclave of Nagorno-Karabakh, denounced Turkey’s role in the Nagorno-Karabakh conflict, and called for an immediate ceasefire.

== Congressional Hellenic Israel Alliance ==
In 2013, Deutch and Representative Gus Bilirakis created a bipartisan group of Greek-American and Jewish-American members of Congress called the Congressional Hellenic Israel Alliance. It was announced at a special congressional event.

== Retirement from Congress ==
On February 28, 2022, Deutch announced he would not seek reelection in 2022, instead taking a job as chief executive officer of the New York City-based nonprofit American Jewish Committee.

On September 30, 2022, the U.S. House of Representatives was notified that Deutch was resigning at the end of the day.

== Personal life ==
Deutch is married and has three children. He is a vegan.

== See also ==
- List of Jewish members of the United States Congress

U.S. House of Representatives
| Preceded by Robert Wexler | Member of the U.S. House of Representatives from Florida's 19th congressional district 2010–2013 | Succeeded by Trey Radel |
| Preceded by Mario Díaz-Balart | Member of the U.S. House of Representatives from Florida's 21st congressional district 2013–2017 | Succeeded by Lois Frankel |
| Preceded by Lois Frankel | Member of the U.S. House of Representatives from Florida's 22nd congressional district 2017–2022 | Succeeded by Lois Frankel |
| Preceded by Susan Brooks | Chair of the House Ethics Committee; 2019–2022 | Succeeded by Susan Wild |
U.S. order of precedence (ceremonial)
| Preceded by Robert Wexler as Former U.S. Representative | Order of precedence of the United States as Former U.S. Representative | Succeeded by Michael A. Andrews as Former U.S. Representative |
