= S. Daniel Abraham =

American businessman (1924–2025)

- Born: Sim Daniel Abraham; August 15, 1924; Long Beach, New York, U.S.
- Died: June 29, 2025 (aged 100); New York City, U.S.
- Occupations: Businessman; philanthropist
- Known for: Founder of SlimFast
- Spouses: Estanne Weiner (divorced); Ewa Sebzda
- Children: 6

S. Daniel Abraham (August 15, 1924 – June 29, 2025) was an American businessman, investor and philanthropist. He founded Thompson Medical, best known for the SlimFast diet program, and endowed numerous institutions devoted to Middle East peace, nutritional research, and higher education.

As of October 2018, he had a net worth of $2.1 billion.

== Early life ==
Abraham was born on August 15, 1924, the son of Stella K. and Samuel Abraham. He was raised in an Orthodox Jewish home in Long Beach, New York. His father was a Zionist and follower of Ze'ev Jabotinsky; and Abraham as a teen printed his own newsletter warning Americans about the danger from the Nazis. During World War II, Abraham served in the United States Army in Europe. In 1970, he moved to Israel with his wife and children where he lived through the 1973 Yom Kippur War and returned to the United States in 1978.

== Career ==
Abraham founded Thompson Medical, which introduced the SlimFast line of diet products in the late 1970s. Abraham made Thompson Medical private in 1988; Unilever acquired Slim-Fast for $2.3 billion in 2000. As of October 2016, he had an estimated wealth of US$2.1 billion.

Abraham was the author of the book Peace Is Possible, with a foreword by President Bill Clinton. Abraham also published his memoirs in 2010, entitled Everything is Possible: Life and Business Lessons from a Self-Made Billionaire and the Founder of Slim Fast.

== Philanthropy ==
Abraham founded the Center for Middle East Peace in Washington, D.C. Through personal friendship with leaders in the United States, Israel, and throughout the Middle East, he worked for the past two decades of his life to help bring an end to the Arab/Israeli conflict. He was a major sponsor of the Washington-based United States Institute of Peace.

Abraham endowed an S. Daniel Abraham Chair in Middle East Policy Studies at Princeton University and a Chair in Nutritional Medicine at Harvard Medical School. He has endowed the S. Daniel Abraham Center for Middle East Peace and the S. Daniel Abraham Center for International and Regional Studies at Tel Aviv University. He funded the Dan Abraham School for Business Administration and Economics at Bar-Ilan University in Israel, the S. Daniel Abraham Israel Program at Yeshiva University, and an Honors Program at Stern College for Women. He held honorary doctorates from the Ben-Gurion University of the Negev, Bar-Ilan University, and Yeshiva University. His gift to Mayo Clinic served to create the Dan Abraham Healthy Living Center, whose opening in 2007 received national media coverage. The Stella K. Abraham High School for Girls was dedicated in honor of his mother.

He was a founding member of the New Synagogue of Palm Beach.

== Political contributions ==
Abraham was a long-time donor to the Democratic Party and the Clinton Foundation. He gave $1.5 million to the party and ranked as the number one contributor of soft money to the national parties in 2000.

Abraham donated $3 million to Priorities USA Action, a super PAC which supported Hillary Clinton's 2016 presidential campaign. In 2020, he donated $5 million to Democratic aligned Super PACs, including American Bridge 21st Century, House Majority PAC, and Senate Majority PAC.

== Personal life and death ==
Abraham was divorced from his first wife, Estanne Weiner; they had four daughters: Rebecca, Simmi, Leah, and Tammy. He resided in Palm Beach, Florida.

At the time of his death, Abraham was married to Ewa Sebzda, with whom he had two children, Sarah and Sam.

Abraham died at a hospital in New York City on June 29, 2025, at the age of 100.
