= United States House Foreign Affairs Subcommittee on the Middle East and North Africa =

U.S. House committee

The U.S. House Subcommittee on the Middle East and North Africa is a subcommittee within the House Foreign Affairs Committee. It was previously known as the Subcommittee on the Middle East, North Africa and Global Counterterrorism, only gaining jurisdiction over Central Asia policy during the 118th Congress.

== Jurisdiction ==
The regional oversight focus of the Middle East and North Africa Subcommittee aligns with the area of responsibility of the State Department’s Bureau of Near Eastern Affairs. The subcommittee also has functional jurisdiction over the following: (A) Bureaus and programs of the Under Secretary for Management; and (B) The Bureau of Counterterrorism and Countering Violent Extremism.

== Members, 119th Congress ==
Majority	Minority
Mike Lawler, New York, Chair; Darrell Issa, California; Joe Wilson, South Carolina; Tim Burchett, Tennessee; Ronny Jackson, Texas; Thomas Kean Jr., New Jersey; Ryan Zinke, Montana; Michael Baumgartner, Washington	Sheila Cherfilus-McCormick, Florida, Ranking Member (until April 21, 2026); Brad Sherman, California, Ranking Member (from April 21, 2026); Bill Keating, Massachusetts; Gerry Connolly, Virginia (until May 25, 2025); Kweisi Mfume, Maryland; George Latimer, New York

== Historical membership rosters ==
=== 115th Congress ===
Majority	Minority
Ileana Ros-Lehtinen, Florida, Chairwoman; Steve Chabot, Ohio; Darrell Issa, California; Ron DeSantis, Florida; Mark Meadows, North Carolina; Paul Cook, California; Adam Kinzinger, Illinois; Lee Zeldin, New York; Daniel Donovan, New York; Ann Wagner, Missouri; Brian Mast, Florida; Brian Fitzpatrick, Pennsylvania	Ted Deutch, Florida, Ranking Member; Gerry Connolly, Virginia; David Cicilline, Rhode Island; Lois Frankel, Florida; Brendan Boyle, Pennsylvania; Tulsi Gabbard, Hawaii; Brad Schneider, Illinois; Thomas Suozzi, New York; Ted Lieu, California

=== 116th Congress ===
Majority	Minority
Ted Deutch, Florida, Chair; Gerry Connolly, Virginia; David Cicilline, Rhode Island; Ted Lieu, California; Colin Allred, Texas; Tom Malinowski, New Jersey; David Trone, Maryland, Vice Chair; Brad Sherman, California; Bill Keating, Massachusetts; Juan Vargas, California	Joe Wilson, South Carolina, Ranking Member; Steve Chabot, Ohio; Adam Kinzinger, Illinois; Lee Zeldin, New York; Brian Mast, Florida; Brian Fitzpatrick, Pennsylvania; Guy Reschenthaler, Pennsylvania; Steve Watkins, Kansas

=== 117th Congress ===
Majority	Minority
David Cicilline, Rhode Island, Chair; Ted Deutch, Florida (until September 30, 2022); Gerry Connolly, Virginia; David Cicilline, Rhode Island; Ted Lieu, California; Colin Allred, Texas; Tom Malinowski, New Jersey; Kathy Manning, North Carolina, Vice Chair; Bill Keating, Massachusetts; Brad Sherman, California; Juan Vargas, California; Brad Schneider, Illinois	Joe Wilson, South Carolina, Ranking Member; Scott Perry, Pennsylvania; Adam Kinzinger, Illinois; Lee Zeldin, New York; Brian Mast, Florida; Tim Burchett, Tennessee; Greg Steube, Florida; Ronny Jackson, Texas; Maria Elvira Salazar, Florida

=== 118th Congress ===
Majority	Minority
Joe Wilson, South Carolina, Chair; Brian Mast, Florida; Tim Burchett, Tennessee; Ronny Jackson, Texas; Jim Baird, Indiana; Mike Lawler, New York; Rich McCormick, Georgia	Dean Phillips, Minnesota, Ranking Member; Brad Sherman, California; Gerry Connolly, Virginia; David Cicilline, Rhode Island (until May 31, 2023); Kathy Manning, North Carolina; Gabe Amo, Rhode Island (from November 15, 2023)
