= Tennessee's 7th Senate district =

American legislative district

Tennessee's 7th State Senate district
Senator
Richard Briggs; R–Knoxville
- Demographics: 81% White; 6% Black; 6% Hispanic; 3% Asian; 4% Multiracial
- Population (2022): 205,185

Tennessee's 7th Senate district is one of 33 districts in the Tennessee Senate. It has been represented by Republican Richard Briggs since his 2014 primary defeat of fellow Republican Stacey Campfield.

== Geography ==
District 7 covers a gerrymandered swath of Knox County, including parts of downtown Knoxville as well as nearby suburbs such as Farragut.

The district is located entirely within Tennessee's 2nd congressional district, and overlaps with the 13th, 14th, 15th, 16th, 18th, 19th, and 89th districts of the Tennessee House of Representatives.

== Recent election results ==
Tennessee Senators are elected to staggered four-year terms, with odd-numbered districts holding elections in midterm years and even-numbered districts holding elections in presidential years.

=== 2018 ===
2018 Tennessee Senate election, District 7
Party	Candidate	Votes	%
Republican	Richard Briggs (incumbent)	38,558	55.6
Democratic	Jamie Ballinger	30,826	44.4
Total votes		69,384	100
Republican hold			

=== 2014 ===
2014 Tennessee Senate election, District 7
Primary election
Party	Candidate	Votes	%
Republican	Richard Briggs	14,056	69.8
Republican	Stacey Campfield (incumbent)	4,864	24.2
Republican	Mike Alford	1,204	6.0
Total votes		20,124	100
General election
Republican	Richard Briggs	27,942	65.3
Democratic	Cheri Siler	14,880	34.7
Total votes		42,822	100
Republican hold			

=== Federal and statewide results ===
Year	Office	Results
2020	President	Trump 52.8 – 44.8%
2016	President	Trump 56.0 – 37.4%
2012	President	Romney 62.0 – 35.9%
2012	Senate	Corker 68.3 – 24.5%
