= S. Daniel Abraham Center for Middle East Peace =

The S. Daniel Abraham Center for Middle East Peace is an American non-profit advocacy group that works with leaders and policymakers in the United States and the Middle East to help reach a just and comprehensive peace that will bring an end to the Arab–Israeli conflict. To further this mission, the Center's activities include meetings with government officials, travel in the region, diplomatic exchanges, conferences, and workshops. The Center also supports negotiations through its exhaustive database of maps and geographical data, often used by decision makers in the region, as well as regular polling of public opinion.

The Center was established in 1989 by U.S. Congressman Wayne Owens (D-Utah) and then-Slim Fast Foods Chairman S. Daniel Abraham. A World War II combat veteran, Abraham had experienced the horrors of war and committed himself to the prevention of future conflicts. When he met Congressman Owens, who served on the House Foreign Affairs and Select Intelligence Committees, the two men recognized that they shared a determination to achieve a peaceful resolution to the Arab–Israeli conflict.

Since its founding, the Center's officers have traveled extensively and regularly throughout the Middle East. The Center has also sponsored numerous fact-finding missions to the region for members of Congress, government officials, and private citizens to meet with Middle East leaders. Through visits to Israel and more than 20 Arab countries, the Center has enabled American decision-makers to witness first hand the challenges facing leaders who seek peace in the region.

In 2009, it was announced that U.S. Congressman Robert Wexler (D-Florida) would become president of the Center after resigning from the House of Representatives.
