= Roger Kane =

American politician (born 1963)

Member of the Tennessee House of Representatives from the 89th district
- In office January 8, 2013 – January 8, 2019
- Preceded by: Jeanne Richardson (redistricted)
- Succeeded by: Justin Lafferty

Personal details
- Born: November 28, 1963 (age 62)
- Party: Republican
- Spouse: Brenda Kane
- Children: 4
- Education: University of Houston (BA)
- Website: House website

Roger Kane (born November 28, 1963) is an American politician. He is a Republican and former member of the Tennessee House of Representatives for the 89th district, encompassing part of Knox County, Tennessee, including Knoxville.

== Biography ==
=== Early life ===
He was born on November 28, 1963. His father worked for the United States Army, and he has four siblings. He graduated from the University of Houston with a bachelor's in Business Administration and History Education. He currently is working on his Masters in Public Administration.

=== Career ===
In 1988, he started his career in insurance at the Farmers Insurance Group. In 1996, he moved to Tennessee and by 1999, he managed his own agency. Since 2007, he has also taught with Kaplan Financial Ltd.

He served as a Tennessee state representative. He was President of the Karns Business Association and the Karns Fair Board. He stepped down from those positions prior to taking office January 2013. He is also a member of the Knoxville Chamber of Commerce, the National Federation of Independent Business and the Karns High School Foundation. Karns Volunteer Fire Department board and the Tennessee College of Applied Technology Board

=== Personal life ===
He is married, and has four children. He attends the West Park Baptist Church in Knoxville. Leads the Special Needs Ministry since 2019
