= SlimFast =

American diet supplement company

- Product type: Dietary supplement foods
- Current owner: Heartland Food Products Group
- Country: United States
- Introduced: July 11, 1977; 49 years ago
- Markets: U.S., UK, Republic of Ireland, Canada, France, Germany, Iceland, Latin America
- Previous owners: Thompson Medical Company, Unilever, Kainos Capital, Glanbia
- Website: slimfast.com

SlimFast is an American company headquartered in Palm Beach Gardens, Florida, that markets an eponymous brand of shakes, bars, snacks, packaged meals, and other dietary supplement foods sold in the U.S., Canada, France, Germany, Iceland, Ireland, Latin America, and the UK. SlimFast promotes diets and weight loss plans featuring its food products.

There is mixed evidence on the effectiveness of the diet, although it appears to function no better than behavioral counseling.

== History ==
SlimFast was started in July 1977 as a product line of the Thompson Medical Company, founded in the 1940s by S. Daniel Abraham. The product was rolled out nationwide in a marketing campaign that began on July 11, 1977 for "a fat-free, carbohydrate-free, animal-based fortified cherry-flavored protein supplement formula" that promised to make purchasers "feel better, cleaner, stronger and healthier.

Thompson Medical also sold the controversial weight loss dietary supplement Dexatrim. In 1987, Abraham took the brand private, and it was acquired by Unilever in 2000. In 2014, Unilever sold SlimFast to Kainos Capital. After the sale, KSF Acquisition invested with Kainos Capital in order to take responsibility for the SlimFast brand in the UK, Ireland and Germany.

In 2018, Glanbia Plc. acquired SlimFast from Kainos Capital.

On December 3, 2009, SlimFast recalled all of its canned products due to possible bacterial contamination. The company stated that it had halted production until the cause was discovered. No further problems or issues have been noted. In 2011, SlimFast stopped producing cans and has since used plastic bottles.

On September 17, 2025, Carmel, IN based, Heartland Food Products Group (makers of the Splenda brand) acquired Slimfast.

In October 2025, the company sold its UK and European operations to Supreme, a UK-based company, for $26.5 million.

== Products ==
=== Original (1987–2004) ===
SlimFast was originally just a diet shake product line. It consisted of chocolate, strawberry, and vanilla shakes meant to replace breakfast and lunch. The company suggested customers eat a low-calorie dinner. Usually, dieters would pick a low-calorie frozen dinner brand such as Lean Cuisine or Weight Watchers, as the SlimFast diet was a convenience product line that offered none of its own dinner products. Later, in the mid-1990s, SlimFast began offering meal bars that could be used as meal replacements.

== Effectiveness ==
In a 2009 study involving 300 overweight and obese males and females aged 21–60 years published by Cambridge University Press, the SlimFast programme achieved weight losses of between 5 kg (11 lbs) and 9 kg (19 lbs) after six months compared to a control diet. The results were comparable to that of both the Weight Watchers 'Pure Points' programme and Rosemary Conley's 'Eat yourself Slim' Diet and Fitness Plan (a low-fat diet popular in the United Kingdom).
