= Douglas Gunnels =

American politician

Douglas E. Gunnels

Member of the Tennessee House of Representatives from the 21st district
- In office 1989–2001
- Preceded by: M.F. "Benny" Stafford
- Succeeded by: Russell Johnson

Personal details
- Born: August 15, 1948 (age 77)
- Party: Republican
- Spouse: Vicki
- Children: 2

Douglas Gunnels is an American politician who was a state representative in the Tennessee House of Representatives from 1989 to 2001. A Republican, he served the 21st house district, which encompasses Monroe and Loudon counties. Gunnels was preceded by M.F Stafford of Lenoir City, then succeeded by Russell Johnson of Loudon in 2001.
