= Jimmy Matlock =

American politician (born 1959)

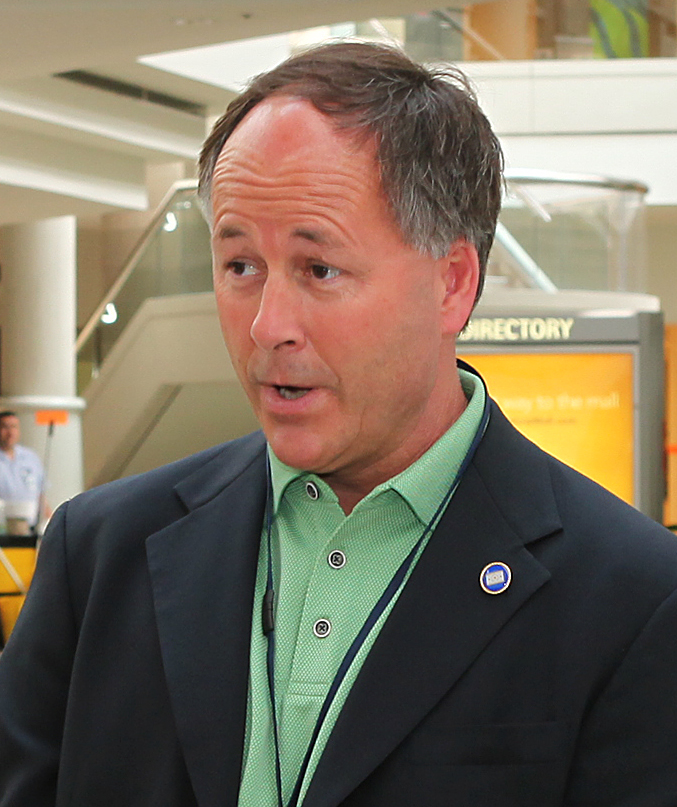

Member of the Tennessee House of Representatives from the 21st district
- In office January 9, 2007 – January 8, 2019
- Preceded by: Russell Johnson
- Succeeded by: Lowell Russell

Personal details
- Born: February 5, 1959 (age 67) Loudon, Tennessee, U.S.
- Party: Republican
- Spouse: Dean
- Education: Middle Tennessee State University; University of Tennessee, Knoxville

Jimmy Matlock (born February 5, 1959) is an American politician, business owner, and Republican member of the Tennessee House of Representatives for the 21st district, encompassing Lenoir City, and parts of Loudon County and Monroe County. He served from 2007 to 2019. He succeeded Russell Johnson. Matlock was succeeded by Lowell Russell.

== Biography ==
Jimmy Matlock was born on February 5, 1959, in Loudon, Tennessee. He attended the Middle Tennessee State University and the University of Tennessee. He inherited a small business.

He is a boardmember of the Tellico Reservoir Development Agency, the Eaton Crossroads Ruritan Club, BB&T for the Tennessee region, the Loudon County United Way, the East Tennessee Church of the Nazarene Advisory Board. He is also a former chair of the Loudon County Republican Party, and a member of the Chambers of Commerce of Loudon County, McMinn County, Monroe County, and Blount County.

He is married with three children, and he is a Christian. Matlock is the owner of Matlock Tire Corporation headquartered in Lenoir City, Tennessee. The American Conservative Union gave him a 93% evaluation in 2017.

Tennessee House of Representatives
| Preceded by Russell Johnson | Member of the Tennessee House of Representatives from the 21st district 2007–2019 | Succeeded by Lowell Russell |
