= John W. McCormack Graduate School of Policy and Global Studies =

The John W. McCormack Graduate School of Policy Studies at UMass Boston was founded in 2003 and grew out of the John W. McCormack Institute for Public Affairs which opened in 1983. In 2010, the school expanded its mission and name. The McCormack Graduate School also provides editorial management of the New England Journal of Public Policy and two peer-reviewed academic journals, the Journal of Aging and Social Policy and Research on Aging.

== Graduate degree and Certificate programs ==
- Conflict resolution (Graduate certificates, MA degree)
- Gerontology (Graduate certificates, MS and PhD degrees)
- Global Governance and Human Security (PhD degree)
- International Relations (MSPA degree)
- Public Affairs (MSPA degree)
- Public Policy (PhD degree)
- Women in Politics and Public Policy (Graduate certificate)

== Centers, Institutes, and Special projects ==
- Center for Community Democracy and Democratic Literacy
- Center for Governance and Sustainability
- Center for Peace, Democracy, and Development
- Center for Rebuilding Sustainable Communities after Disasters
- Center for Social and Demographic Research on Aging
- Center for Social Policy
- Center for Women in Politics and Public Policy
- Center on Media and Society
- Collaborative Institute for Oceans, Climate, and Security
- Commonwealth Compact, a Massachusetts workforce diversity initiative
- Edward J. Collins, Jr. Center for Public Management
- Gerontology Institute
- John Joseph Moakley Chair for Peace and Reconciliation
- Osher Lifelong Learning Institute
- Pension Action Center
- The Democracy Lab at UMass Boston

The school is named in honor of U.S. House of Representatives Speaker John W. McCormack.
