= Coalition of Urban Serving Universities =

The Coalition of Urban Serving Universities (commonly referred to as USU) is a selective organization of 39 U.S. public research universities located in metropolitan areas. The USU member schools began formally meeting in 2005.

== History ==
The Urban 13 began meeting during the 1970s as an informal research-sharing association of urban universities in major metropolitan areas of the United States. In 1998, The Great Cities' Universities (GCU) coalition was established as a successor organization. Great Cities' Universities initially consisted of nineteen member institutions that were public universities located in urban areas in the United States and expanded over time. In 2006, they partnered with the Association of Public and Land-grant Universities to hold joint meetings.

== Activities ==
The consortium engages in public-private partnerships to explore and address urban issues, such as those related to education, housing, environment, criminal justice, transportation, health care, workforce development, and economic stimulation. The coalition has four specific areas of focus with the goal of strengthening communities throughout the nation via health and community-involvement initiatives:

- The Education Pipeline/Urban Educator Corps seeks to improve the quality and quantity of urban teachers and implement evidence-based “cradle-to-career” education partnerships.
- The Urban Health Initiative aims at increasing increase the number, diversity, and competence of the health workforce and reduce health disparities in urban communities.
- The Strengthening Communities Initiative is tasked with revitalizing neighborhoods, build community capacity, and strengthen regional economies.
- In the area of student performance, the organization seeks to fostering student achievement to identify, assess with appropriate metrics, and disseminate substantive, scalable best practices along the continuum of efforts that support student success and degree completion.

== Governance ==
As of 2026, The USU Board of Directors is composed of presidents and chancellors of 13 member institutions. USU is headquartered in Washington, D.C.

== Membership ==
Current members include the following:

- California State University, Fresno
- California State University, Northridge
- Cleveland State University
- Florida International University
- Georgia State University
- Indiana University Indianapolis
- Kean University
- Montclair State University
- Morgan State University
- Portland State University
- Ohio State University
- Portland State University
- Rutgers University–Newark
- SUNY Downstate Health Sciences University
- Temple University
- University at Albany, SUNY
- University of Alabama at Birmingham
- University of California, Riverside
- University of Central Florida
- University of Cincinnati
- University of Colorado Denver
- University of Houston
- University of Illinois Chicago
- University of Massachusetts Boston
- University of Memphis
- University of Missouri–Kansas City
- University of Nevada, Las Vegas
- University of Nevada, Reno
- University of New Mexico
- University of New Orleans
- University of North Carolina at Charlotte
- University of South Carolina
- University of Texas at Arlington
- University of Texas Rio Grande Valley
- University of Texas at San Antonio
- University of Toledo
- University of Washington Tacoma
- University of Wisconsin–Milwaukee
- Virginia Commonwealth University
- Wayne State University
- Wichita State University
- Great Cities' Universities

== See also ==
- Coalition of Urban and Metropolitan Universities
