= Carlo L. Golino =

- Carlo and his wife
- Born: June 6, 1913; Pescara, Italy
- Died: February 14, 1991 (aged 77); La Selva Beach, California
- Spouse: Anna Martin

Carlo Luigi Golino (1913–1991) was an Italian American who taught Italian literature at many colleges in the United States.

Golino received his B.A. from City College of New York (1936); an M.A. (Italian literature) from Columbia University (1937); an M.A. (oriental languages) from the University of Colorado (1944); and his Ph.D. in romance languages and literature from the University of California, Berkeley (1948). From 1942 to 1946, he served in the United States Navy where he acted as a Japanese interpreter. He was appointed to the faculty at UCLA in 1947. In 1965, he was appointed Professor of Italian and Dean of College of Letters and Sciences on the Riverside campus. Subsequently, he became Vice Chancellor on the Riverside Campus. In 1973, he left California to become Chancellor and Commonwealth Professor of Italian at the University of Massachusetts Boston, where he remained until his retirement in 1978.

Golino contributed considerably to the field of Italian scholarship and particularly to contemporary Italian literature. One of his main goals was to make Italian culture more readily available to college students and the American public. His numerous lectures on and reviews of contemporary works being published in Italy and still unknown in the United States speak clearly to this. As a scholar, he was known among Italianists as an incisive promoter of the concept of the baroque. His visibility was due largely to his critical edition of Carlo de' Dottori's seventeenth century work, La prigione (1962), his Italian grammars with Charles Speroni, his translations and articles on contemporary Italian poetry, and his founding of the Italian Quarterly. In 1958 and again in 1963, Golino received awards from the Italian government for his contributions to Italian culture.
