= University of Massachusetts Boston =

Public research university in Boston, Massachusetts, US

- Motto: "To Preserve and Extend Knowledge"
- Type: Public research university
- Established: 1964; 62 years ago
- Parent institution: UMass System
- Accreditation: NECHE
- Academic affiliations: CUMU; GCU; USU
- Endowment: $171 million (2024)
- Chancellor: Marcelo Suárez-Orozco
- President: Marty Meehan
- Provost: Joseph B. Berger
- Faculty: 720 full-time, 432 part-time
- Students: 15,428 (fall 2025)
- Undergraduates: 12,178 (fall 2025)
- Postgraduates: 3,250 (fall 2025)
- Location: Dorchester, Boston, Massachusetts, United States; 42.313432°N 71.038445°W
- Campus: Urban, 120 acres (0.49 km^{2})
- Acceptance rate: 83%
- Colors: Blue and white
- Nickname: Beacons
- Sporting affiliations: NCAA Division III – Little East
- Mascot: Bobby the Beacon
- Website: www.umb.edu
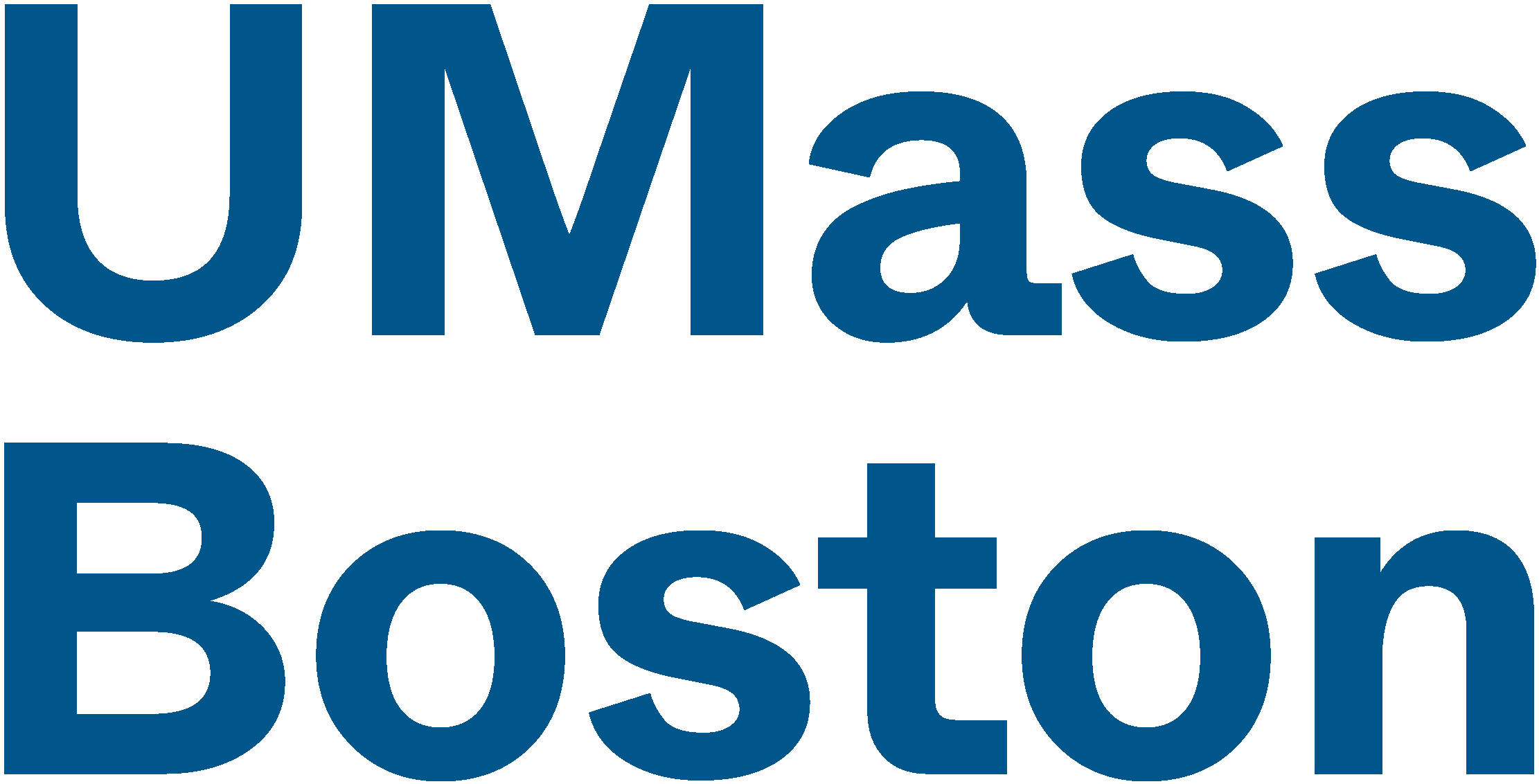

The University of Massachusetts Boston (UMass Boston) is a public university in Boston, Massachusetts, United States.

The university is a member of the Coalition of Urban Serving Universities and the Coalition of Urban and Metropolitan Universities. It is classified among "R1: Doctoral Universities – Very high research spending and doctorate production". It is the only public research university in Boston and is part of the five-campus University of Massachusetts system.

As of January 2025, the University of Massachusetts Boston offered 239 areas of study across undergraduate, graduate, and certificate levels. These included 68 bachelor's degree programs, 49 master's degree programs, and 30 doctoral programs along with numerous concentrations, tracks, minors, and certificate programs.

== History ==
=== Origins (pre-1964) ===
The University of Massachusetts System dates back to the founding of Massachusetts Agricultural College under the Morrill Land-Grant Acts in 1863. Prior to the founding of UMass Boston, the Amherst campus was the only public, comprehensive university in the state. As late as the 1950s, Massachusetts ranked at or near the bottom in public funding per capita for higher education, and proposals to expand the University of Massachusetts into Boston was opposed both by faculty and administrators at the Amherst campus and by the private colleges and universities in Boston. In 1962, the 162nd Massachusetts General Court expanded the UMass System for the first time to Worcester, Massachusetts, with the creation of the University of Massachusetts Medical School. In 1963, UMass president John W. Lederle informed the General Court that more than 1,200 graduates of Boston area high schools qualified to attend the University of Massachusetts were denied admission to the Amherst campus due to lack of space, and endorsed expanding the system with a commuter campus in Boston.

At the time, there were 12,000 freshman applications to the University of Massachusetts in Amherst with only 2,600 slots, yet the majority of the applicants lived in the Greater Boston area. In 1964, Massachusetts Senate majority leader Maurice A. Donahue and state senator George V. Kenneally Jr. introduced a bill to establish a Boston campus for the UMass System. The bill was opposed by several private colleges and universities in the area, including Northeastern University, Boston University, and Boston College (who argued that the state would be better off subsidizing the existing private institutions in the city), as well as by Boston State College (who argued for expanding its campus on Huntington Avenue instead). However, the Huntington Avenue building of Boston State College could not be expanded to accommodate a 15,000-student campus, and the local news media and public opinion generally favored creating the new Boston campus for the UMass System.

=== 1964–1974: Park Square campus ===
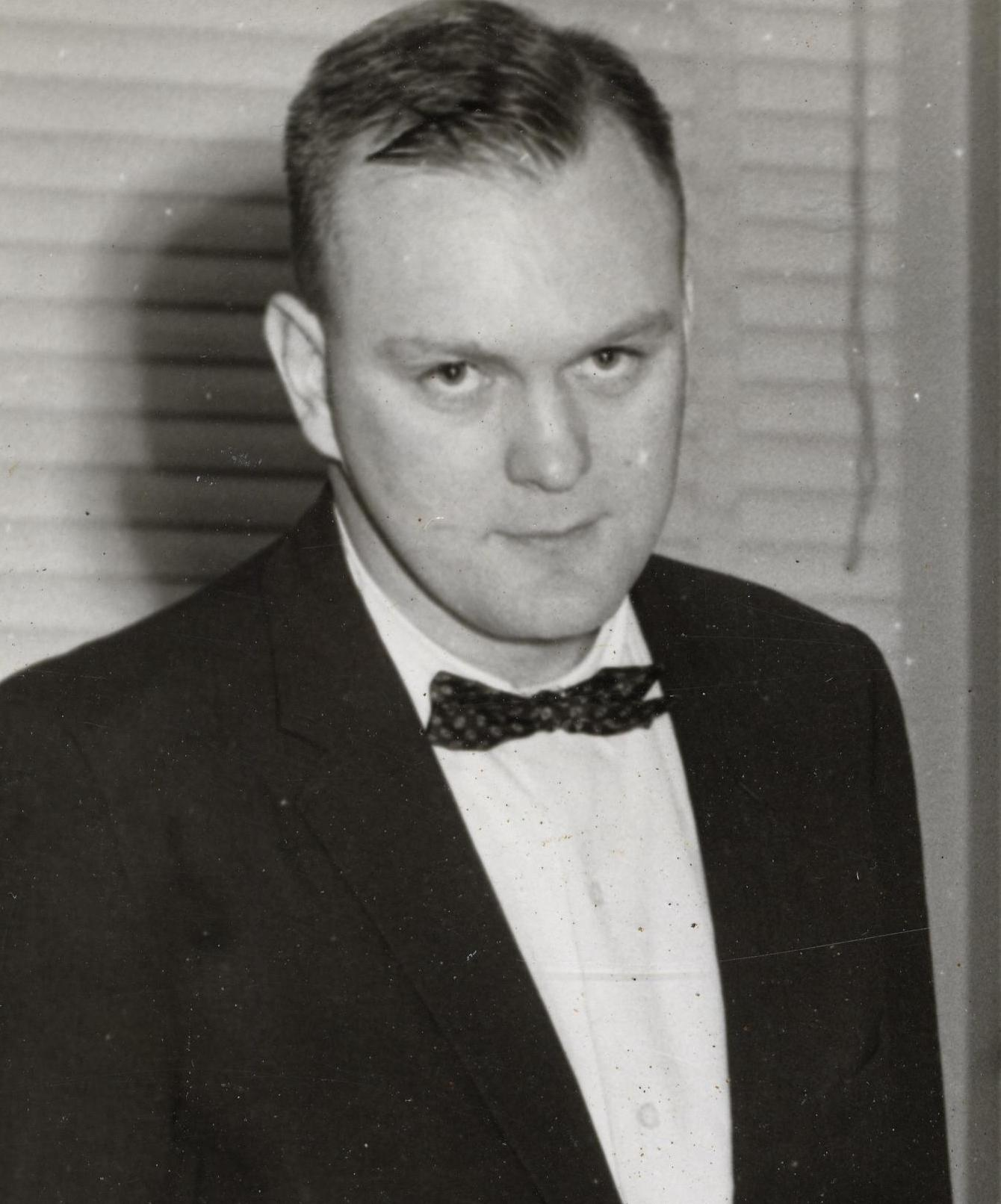
Massachusetts House of Representatives Majority Whip Robert H. Quinn co-sponsored the bill to establish UMass Boston in the House.

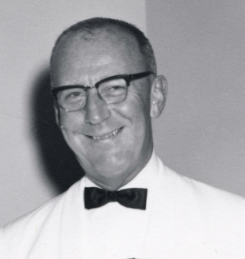
Massachusetts Senate Majority Leader Maurice A. Donahue co-sponsored the bill to establish UMass Boston in the Senate.

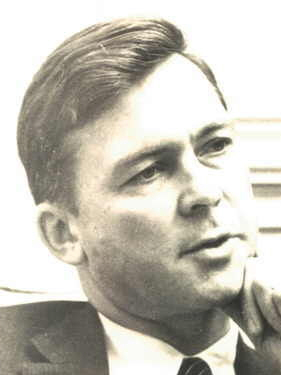
Massachusetts Governor Endicott Peabody (1963–1965) signed the bill into law on June 18, 1964.

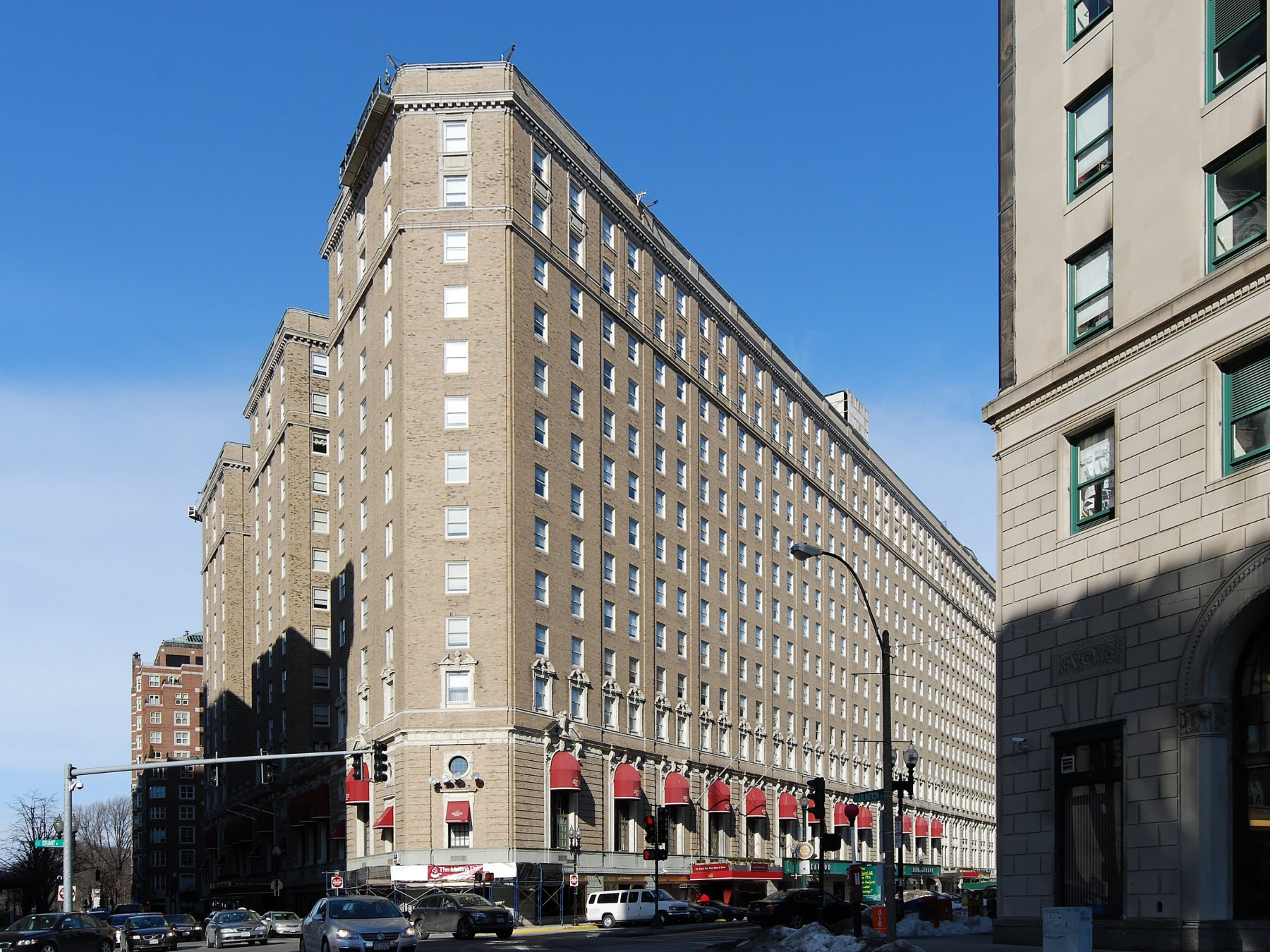
UMass Boston leased part of the Boston Park Plaza (then known as the Statler Hilton Boston) for faculty and departmental office space in the late 1960s, while in February 1966, the Massachusetts General Court appropriated funds for the university to purchase the former headquarters of the Boston Gas Company (in the foreground) which the company had leased to the university in September 1965 for its inaugural semester.

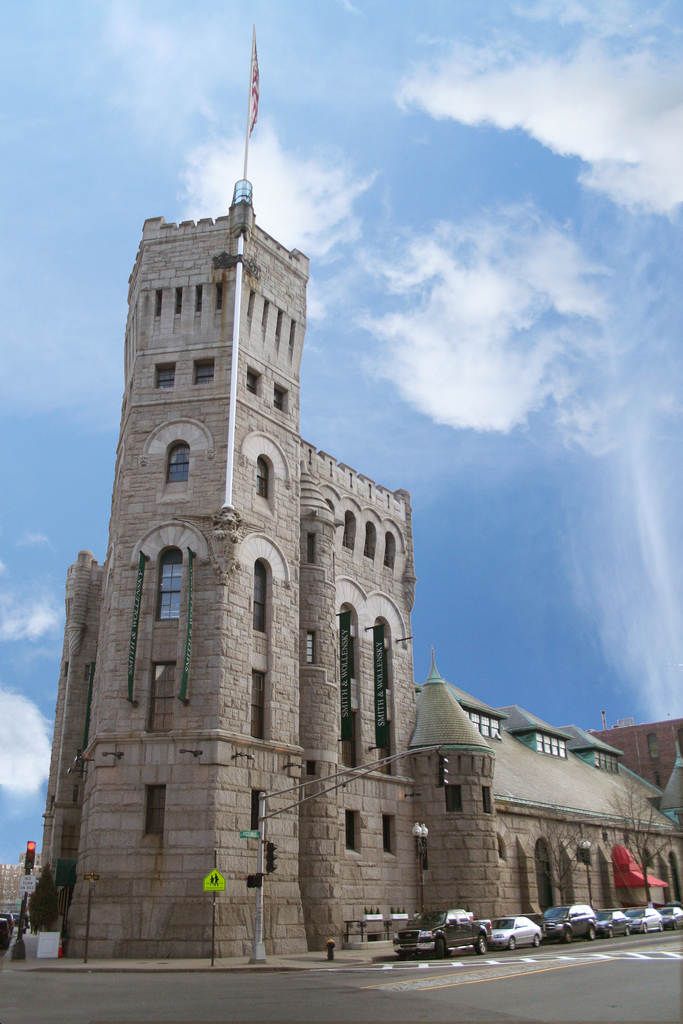
Also in the late 1960s, UMass Boston leased the Armory of the First Corps of Cadets and converted it into the university's first library.

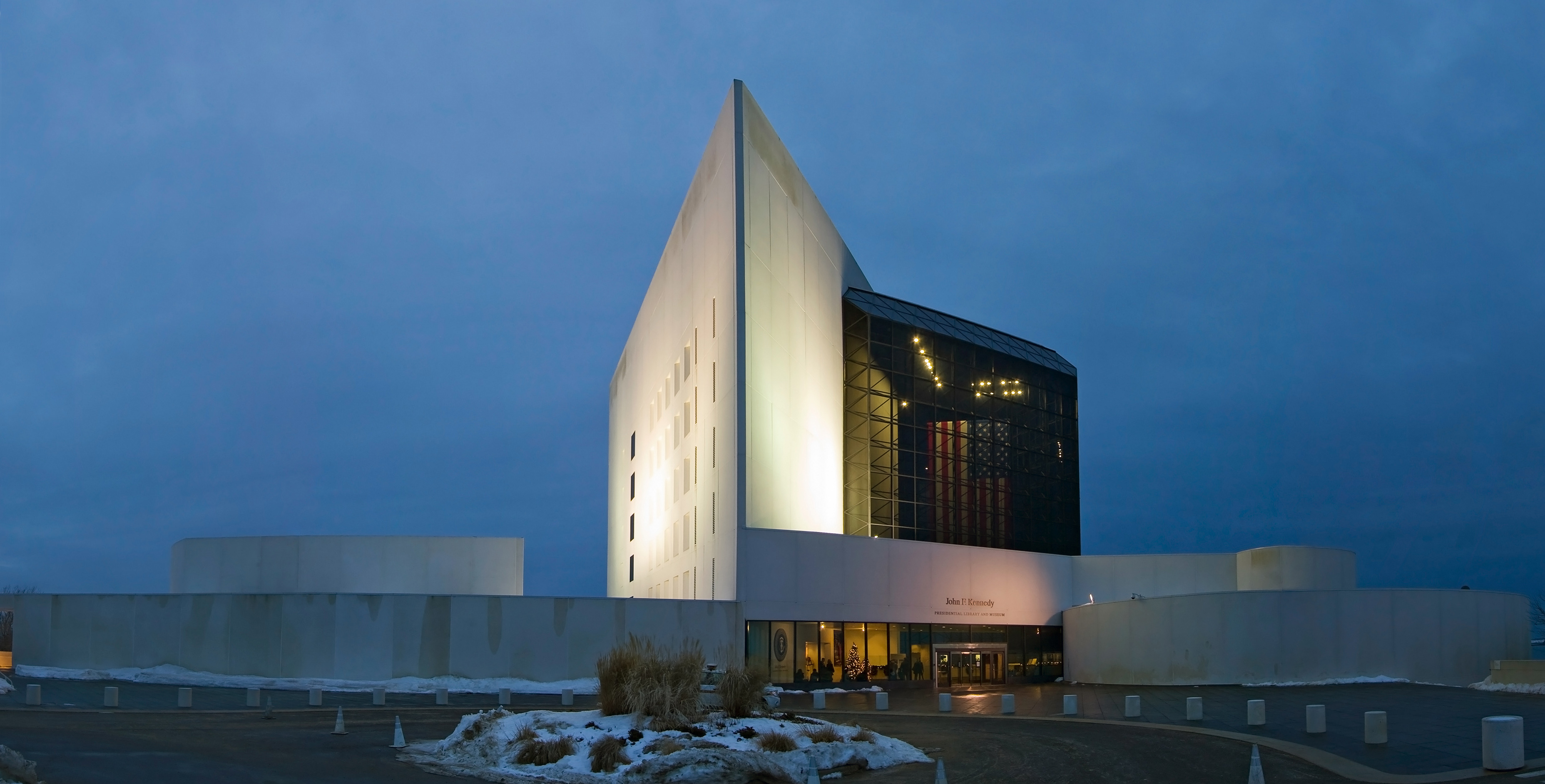
Opened in October 1979, the John F. Kennedy Presidential Library and Museum is located on Columbia Point next to UMass Boston.

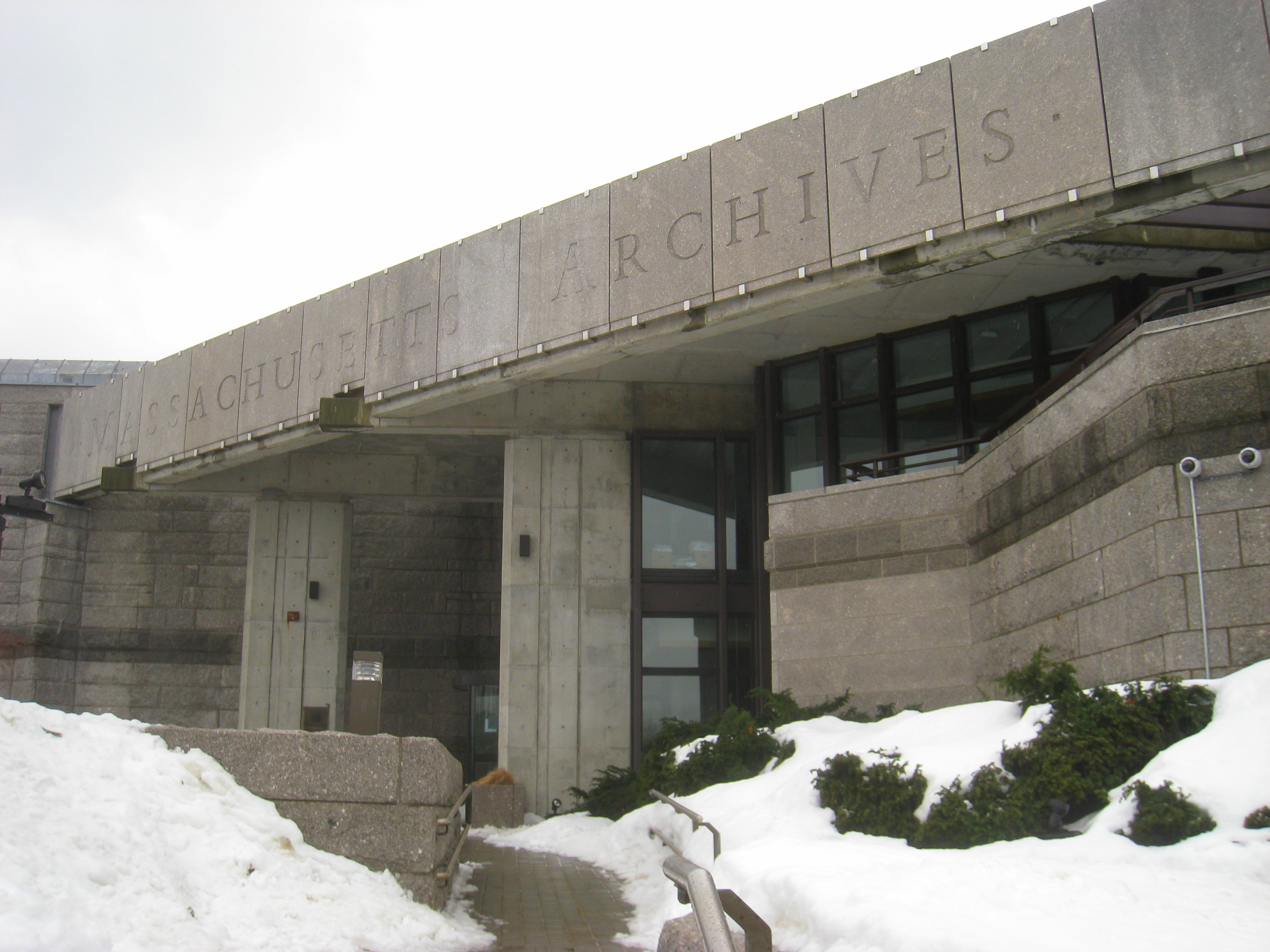
In 1981, the Massachusetts state government announced that the Massachusetts Archives and Commonwealth Museum would be built next to the JFK Presidential Library.

Italian literature scholar Carlo L. Golino served as the university's chancellor from 1973 to 1978.

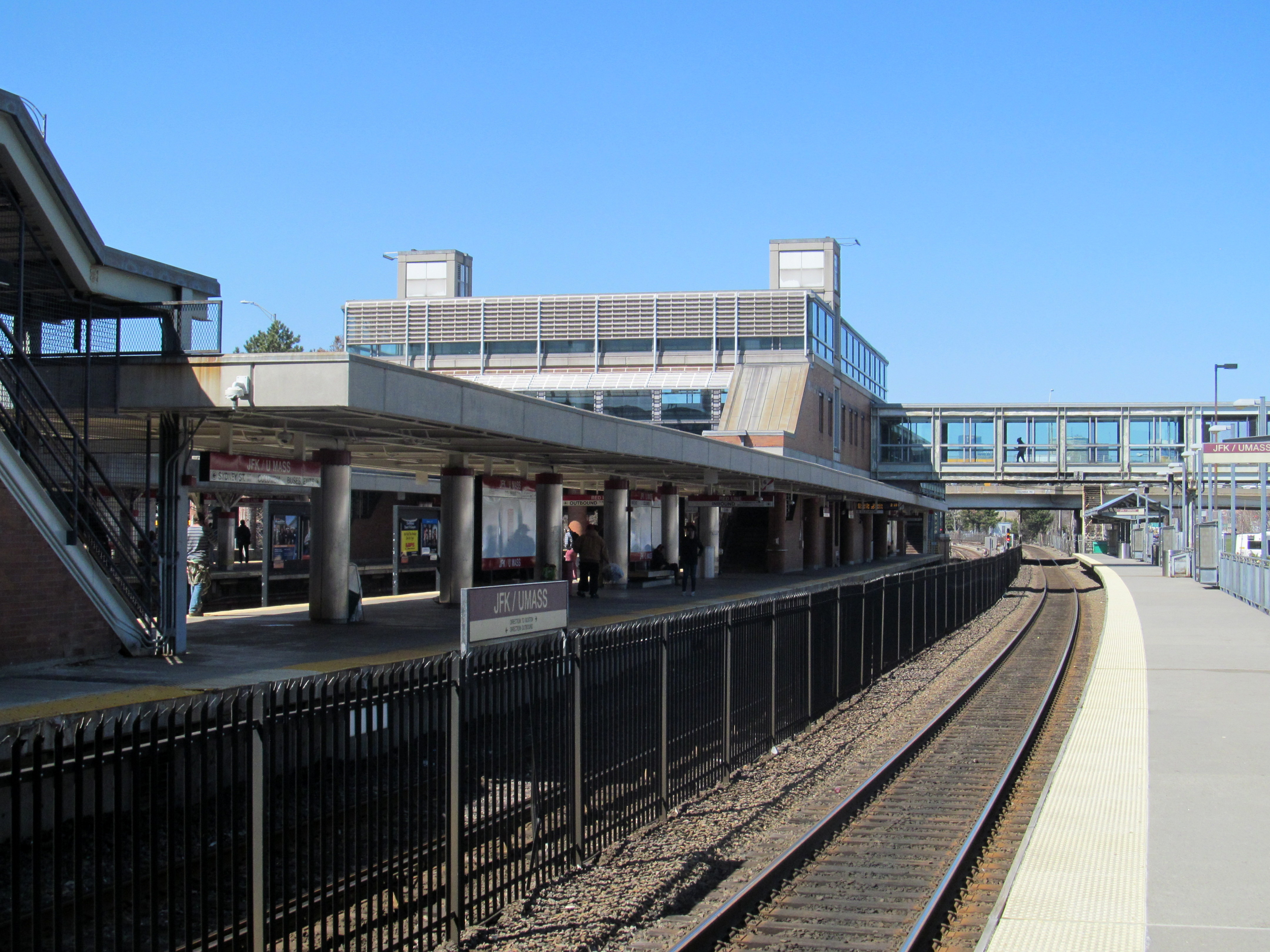
The JFK/UMass station in April 2016. The MBTA renamed the stop in 1982 after it had been called Columbia Station from when it first opened in 1927.

In June 1964, with a $200,000 appropriation, the legislation establishing the University of Massachusetts Boston was signed into law. UMass President John W. Lederle began recruiting freshmen students, faculty, and administrative staff for the fall semester of 1965 (with goals of 1,000 students and 80 faculty members), and appointed his assistant at the Amherst campus, John W. Ryan, as UMass Boston's first chancellor. Ryan recruited tenured faculty members from the Amherst campus to relocate and form the UMass Boston faculty, and appointed Amherst's history professor Paul A. Gagnon and Amherst's provost and biology professor Arthur Gentile to hire the humanities and natural science faculty members respectively.

Serving as the new university's first provost, Gagnon became the most important faculty member in defining the curriculum and academic focus of the university, saying in June 1965 that "The first aim of the University of Massachusetts at Boston must be to build a university in the ancient tradition of Western civilization." Gagnon would be the principal architect of the university's brief attempt to create a Great Books program called the "Coordinated Freshman Year English-History Program", which was dismantled by the end of the 1960s.

Freshman classes started for 1,240 undergraduate students in September 1965 at a renovated building located at 100 Arlington Street in Downtown Boston, formerly the headquarters of the Boston Gas Company (which had leased the building to the university). Virtually the entire entering class were residents of Massachusetts, with the great majority living in the Greater Boston area. By the fall of 1968, the number of applications to UMass Boston for the fall semester had risen from 2,500 for fall 1965 to 5,700, and total enrollment had risen to 3,600. In the late 1960s, UMass Boston students on average were 23 years old, typically white and male, working part- or full-time, and either married or living with others in an apartment. UMass Boston also reportedly had the largest population of Vietnam War veterans of any US university and the largest population of African American students of all universities in Massachusetts.

In February 1966, the 164th Massachusetts General Court appropriated funds for the university to purchase the building at 100 Arlington Street. Over the next three years, the university also leased the Sawyer Building on Stuart Street, the Salada Buildings on Columbus Avenue, a part of the Boston Statler Hotel for faculty and departmental office space, and the Armory of the First Corps of Cadets (which was converted into the university's library). The student newspaper, The Mass Media, published its inaugural issue on November 16, 1966, and the Founding Day Convocation for the university was held December 10, 1966. In 1968, a group of students started the folk music radio station WUMB-FM. In the summer of 1968, inaugural chancellor John W. Ryan resigned and was succeeded by historian Francis L. Broderick. Chancellor Broderick oversaw the reorganization of the university into separate colleges (College I and College II), along with the establishment of the College of Public and Community Service, and presided over the university's first graduation ceremony on June 12, 1969 (where 500 of the original 1,240 students received diplomas).

By early 1967, some younger professors were holding teach-ins and encouraging their male students to burn their draft cards in protest of "American corporate imperialism." The Young Socialist Alliance and the Students for a Democratic Society both had chapters on campus, and in April 1969, the latter group rallied more than a hundred students protesting the decision to move the university campus to Columbia Point. The following month, a student group called the "Afro-American Society", staged an occupation of summer school registration, demanding the immediate hiring of more Black faculty members and the admission of more Black students. In March 1970, a group of thirty students occupied the chancellor's office after a popular "radical" female professor in the Sociology Department was denied tenure. (Note: Such activism led Chancellor Broderick to approve the formation of a task force led by sociology professor James Blackwell – the university's only tenured African American faculty member – and English professor Mary Anne Ferguson that recommended the hiring of a university affirmative action officer to ensure the equal consideration of minority and woman faculty candidates, and by the mid-1970s, for the UMass Boston Sociology Department to have one-third of its members be black and 40 percent be women – higher ratios than were typical of a university that was neither historically black nor a women's college. Blackwell and Ferguson would go on to play leading roles in establishing the Black and Women's Studies Departments as well.) Following President Richard Nixon's announcement of the Vietnam War's Cambodian campaign on April 30, 1970, and the subsequent shooting of anti-war protestors at Kent State University on May 4, like hundreds of other universities across the United States, UMass Boston administration suspended regular business operations while the campus became consumed by protests. In 1972, Chancellor Francis L. Broderick resigned, and was succeeded by Carlo L. Golino in 1973. During Golino's tenure before the move to Columbia Point, the university began awarding its first master's degrees in English and mathematics.

=== 1974–1988: Columbia Point campus and BSC merger ===
On January 28, 1974, the university opened its new campus on the Columbia Point peninsula. In 1975, enabled by the move to Columbia Point, Chancellor Carlo L. Golino oversaw the opening of the College of Professional Studies (later renamed the College of Management), and in 1976, supervised the merger of College I and College II into a single College of Arts and Sciences. Golino resigned as chancellor in 1978, was succeeded in the interim by Claire Van Ummersen, and succeeded permanently in 1979 by Robert A. Corrigan. In October 1979, a dedication ceremony was held for the opening of the John F. Kennedy Presidential Library and Museum on a 10-acre site adjacent to the university campus.

In 1980, the 171st Massachusetts General Court voted to establish the Massachusetts Board of Regents of Higher Education with the authority to consolidate resources for public higher education in the state, and in 1981, the board decided to merge UMass Boston and Boston State College by 1984. Such a merger (including the Massachusetts College of Art and Design as well) had been proposed in the state legislature in 1963 when UMass Boston was initially founded. Though the 1981 merger had allowed both schools a three-year grace period to ease the transition, a large cut in the state's higher education budget forced the board of regents to require a "shotgun wedding" merger to happen by September 1981 (although the board did allow for it to be delayed until January of the following year). Boston State College's largest programs—its teacher's college, nursing and police administration—transferred over to UMass Boston fully intact, and formed the basis of the College of Education, the College of Nursing and Health Sciences, and the Criminal Justice program in the Sociology Department respectively.

Despite the Boston State College students having a similar demographic profile to UMass Boston students, many students expressed opposition to the merger. Many of Boston State College's undergraduate academic departments and programs that had equivalents at UMass Boston were disbanded, and as fewer of the Boston State faculty had PhDs than the UMass Boston faculty did, the board of regents also decided to terminate the employment of hundreds of faculty and staff at Boston State College. The merger boosted enrollment at UMass Boston by 38 percent in one year (from more than 8,000 in 60 areas of study in 1981 to more than 11,000 in 100 areas of study by 1983), and as Boston State College had more graduate programs than UMass Boston did at the time of the merger, most of Boston State College's graduate programs made the transition and tripled the graduate student enrollment at UMass Boston. By 1995, graduate students accounted for 21 percent of the university's total enrollment, and in 2011, the College of Nursing and Health Sciences was the ninth largest and was ranked as the 50th best undergraduate nursing program in the United States (and third best in New England) by U.S. News & World Report.

In 1988, Chancellor Robert A. Corrigan resigned. Besides the opening of the Clark Athletic Center and the Boston State College merger, during his tenure, he oversaw the authorization of the university's first PhD program (in environmental science), the opening of the John W. McCormack Institute of Public Affairs and the Urban Scholars program for talented Boston Public Schools (BPS) students in 1983, as well as the opening of the William Monroe Trotter Institute for the Study of Black Culture in 1984.

=== 1988–2007: Penney, Gora, and Collins chancellorships ===
In 1988, historian Sherry A. Penney succeeded Robert A. Corrigan as chancellor. Her tenure was initially marred by an economic downturn in Massachusetts, to which Governor Michael Dukakis responded by ordering all state agencies to cut their budgets in the 1989, 1990, and 1991 fiscal years. In response to the budget cuts, Chancellor Penney began initiating major fundraising efforts, and despite the decline in state support, implemented multiple research programs, PhD programs, and oversaw a reorganization of the school's colleges. In 1989, Chancellor Penney oversaw the opening of both the Urban Harbors Institute and The Mauricio Gastón Institute for Latino Community Development and Public Policy, and later oversaw the separation of the College of Arts and Sciences into the College of Science and Mathematics and the College of Liberal Arts. In 1990, the university launched PhD programs in clinical psychology, gerontology, and environmental biology. In 1993, the College of Public and Community Service established the Labor Resource Center and the College of Liberal Arts established the Institute for Asian American Studies, the College of Education began its partnership with The Mather School, and the Boston College Program for Women and Government moved to UMass Boston. Despite Chancellor Penney's efforts, many programs were consolidated or closed, such as the College of Education's undergraduate education degree.

In 1994, the Carnegie Commission on Higher Education classified UMass Boston as a Master's Comprehensive University I. By 1998, the university had four main research areas that accounted for three-quarters of the university's research funding: Environmental Studies, Psycho-Social Functioning of At-Risk Populations, Education, and Health and Social Welfare. In 2000, the Carnegie Foundation for the Advancement of Teaching upgraded UMass Boston's designation to a Doctoral/Research University, Intensive, and UMass Boston now offered seven doctoral programs in public policy, computer science, nursing, and education, in addition to clinical psychology, gerontology, and environmental biology. In the 1990s, the university gained campus chapters of Alpha Lambda Delta and the Golden Key International Honour Society. Enrollment steadily increased during Chancellor Penney's tenure to 12,482 total students and 2,866 graduate students by 2000, and the university went from one in twelve students who were minority or female in 1988 to one in three by 2000. The percentage of Black faculty rose from 13 percent in 1988 to 20 percent in 2000, and the percentage of women faculty rose from less than one-third in 1988 to 41 percent in 2000.

In 2000, Chancellor Penney resigned. She was succeeded in the interim in 2000 by David MacKenzie, and permanently in May 2001 by Jo Ann M. Gora. During Gora's tenure, the McCormack Institute of Public Affairs became the John W. McCormack Graduate School of Policy and Global Studies in 2003, and the PhD program in green chemistry, the first in the world, was launched under the direction of chemist and UMass Boston alumnus John Warner in 2004. Gora resigned as chancellor in 2004 and was succeeded in the interim by J. Keith Motley. During Motley's interim tenure, the university established a partnership with the Dana–Farber/Harvard Cancer Center in 2005.

On April 2, 2004, a new Campus Center next to Wheatley Hall was opened. Construction for the facility began on July 20, 2001, and was completed during the tenure of Chancellor Gora. It became the new entrance for the campus and was the first building constructed since the Clark Athletic Center was completed in 1979. Unlike the original Columbia Point campus buildings, which were uniformly built of brick and faced inward, the Campus Center was designed such that its glass front would look out onto Boston Harbor, and the offices, food court, event space, student clubs, and activities space gave the campus a center of cohesion that was often lacking in the older buildings. In 2005, Chancellor Gora was permanently succeeded by Michael F. Collins.

=== 2007–present: Motley and Suárez-Orozco chancellorships ===
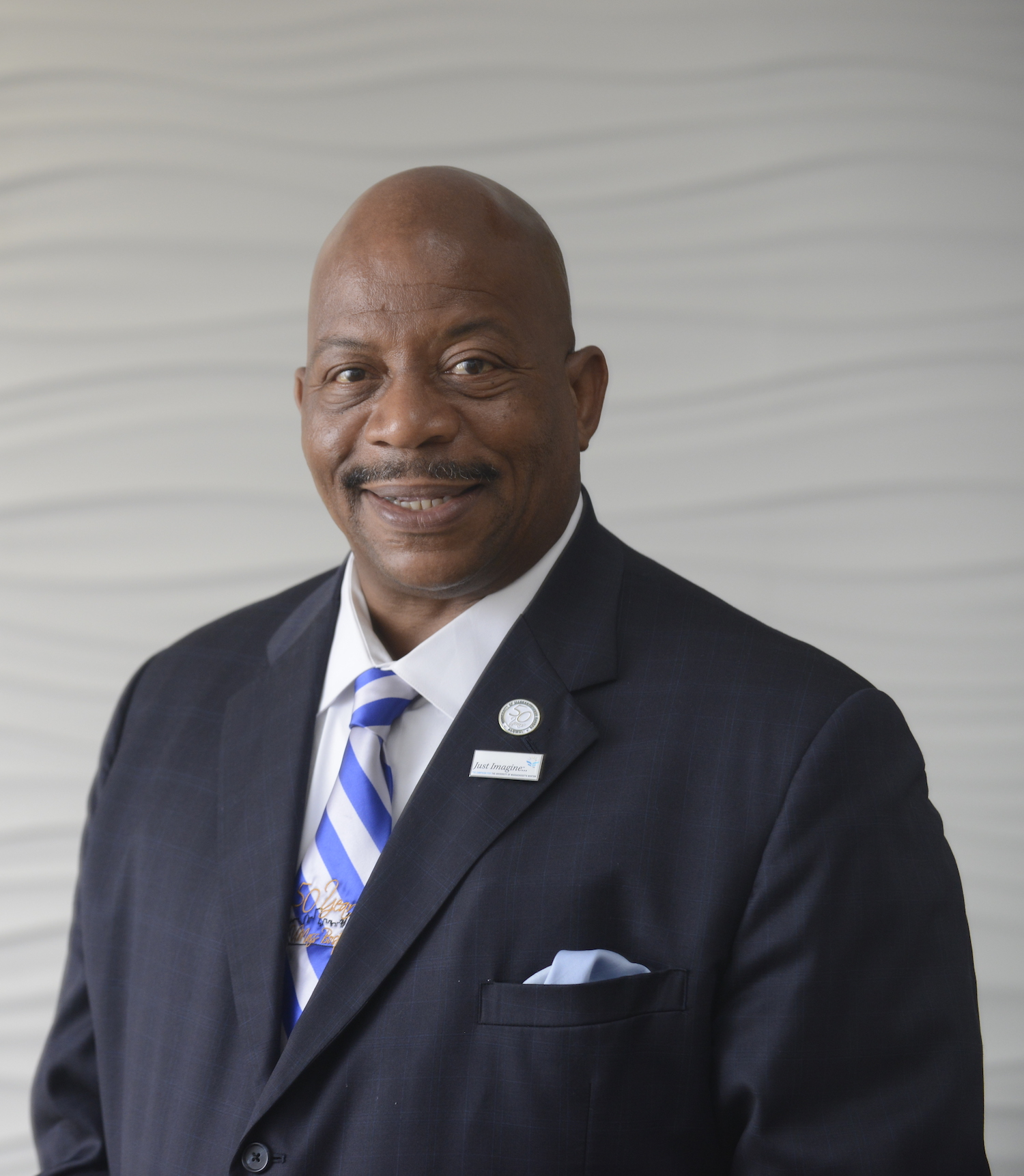
J. Keith Motley was the university's Chancellor from July 1, 2007 to June 30, 2017. In December 2007, Motley proposed the university's 25-Year Master Plan to redevelop its campus to the UMass System Board of Trustees.

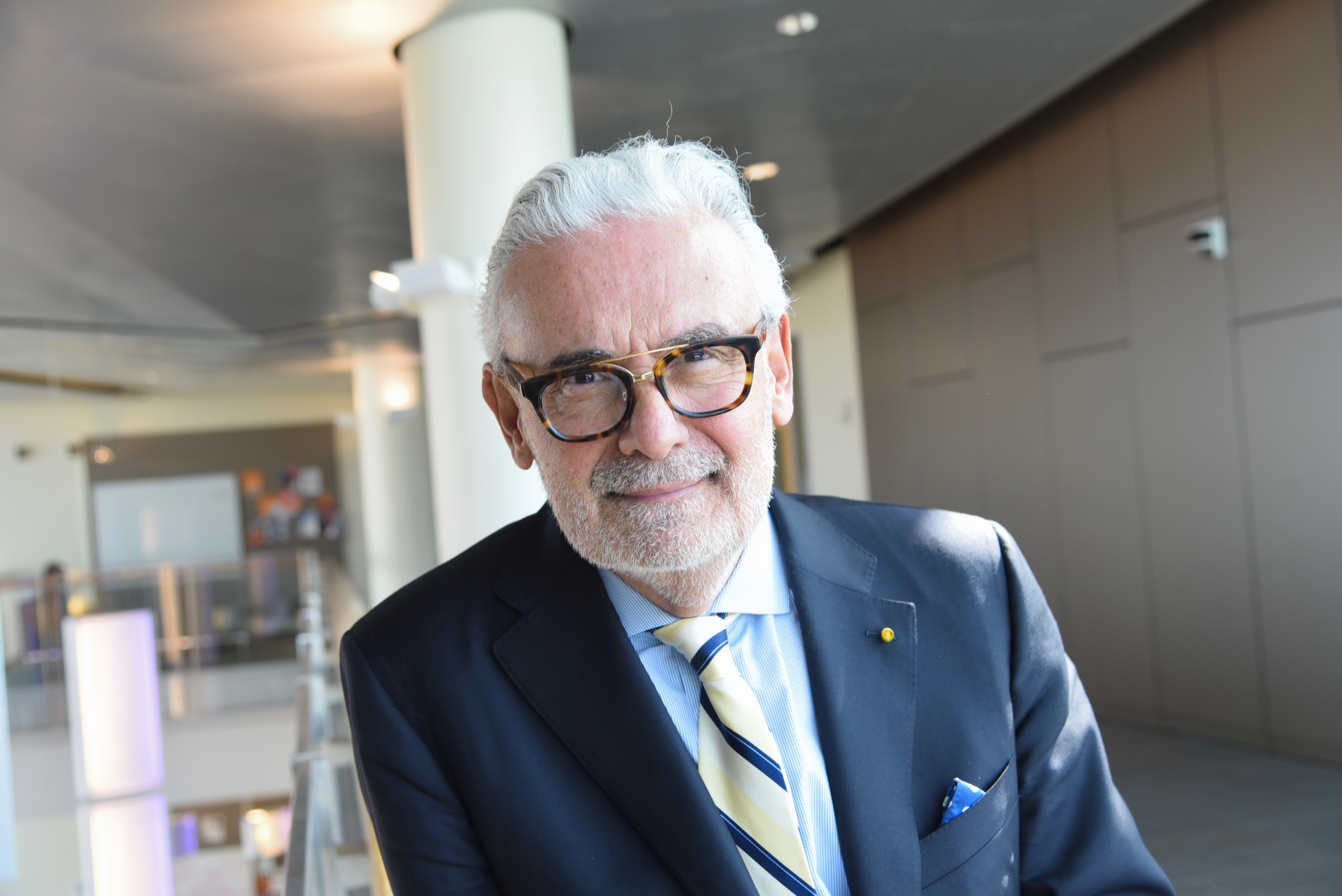
On February 10, 2020, University of California, Los Angeles Dean Marcelo Suárez-Orozco was unanimously appointed as the university's new permanent Chancellor and he assumed the position the following August.

In early 2007, Chancellor Collins resigned, and he was succeeded by J. Keith Motley, the university's first Black chancellor. In 2007, the College of Nursing and Health Sciences began the GoKids Boston program to counter childhood obesity, and in 2008, the Graduate College of Education renamed itself the College of Education and Human Development. In 2010, the Carnegie Foundation for the Advancement of Teaching upgraded UMass Boston's designation a second time, now to a Doctoral/Research University with High Activity.

In 2013, the university established its School for Global Inclusion and Social Development (the first of its kind in the world), its University Honors Program as a separate Honors College, and its School for the Environment and launched an interdisciplinary Nantucket Semester Program. In 2014, research activity at the university had climbed to $60 million, and the university began work on its HarborWalk Improvements and Shoreline Stabilization project. By the fall semester of 2014, total student enrollment had grown to 16,756 with 4,056 graduate students. The number of doctoral students had increased from 230 in the fall of 2000 to 614 in the fall of 2014.

In 2014, UMass Boston celebrated its fiftieth anniversary, and in 2015, the University of Massachusetts Press published the school's first history about its founding and growth, entitled UMass Boston at 50. In 2015, the College of Management enrolled close to one-sixth of all students and more than half of the undergraduate students earning degrees in a STEM field were minority or female. By 2015, UMass Boston students came from 140 different nations and spoke 90 different languages. On January 26, 2015, the university opened its first new academic building since the Columbia Point campus was built, a research facility named the Integrated Sciences Complex. On March 30, 2015, the dedication ceremony for the Edward M. Kennedy Institute for the United States Senate was held. On January 25, 2016, the university began a phased opening of its second new academic facility, University Hall. In September 2016, U.S. News & World Report ranked UMass Boston within the first tier of national universities on its Best Colleges Ranking for the first time in the university's history, tied at number 220.

On March 3, 2017, Barry Mills was appointed the university's deputy chancellor and chief operating officer. On April 5, 2017, university officials announced that Chancellor J. Keith Motley would resign at the end of the academic calendar year. UMass System President Marty Meehan stated Deputy Chancellor Mills would serve as interim chancellor "until [university] finances are stabilized and the university is positioned to attract a world-class chancellor through a global search", specifically to address the university's 2017 operating budget deficit of $30 million. UMass Boston faculty publicly expressed concern that Motley was being scapegoated for the university's budget deficit while Boston City Councilors Tito Jackson and Ayanna Pressley, Massachusetts State Senator Linda Dorcena Forry, and Massachusetts State Representative Russell Holmes called upon System President Meehan to reject Motley's resignation.

On April 8, 2017, at a UMass System Board of Trustees meeting, UMass Boston faculty and students protested decisions by university administration to cut offerings of courses (many required for graduation) in the upcoming summer semester, as well as other programs and to make expense adjustments which reduced the deficit to approximately $6 million or $7 million. On July 1, 2017, Barry Mills became interim chancellor after Keith Motley's resignation. A coalition of UMass Boston administrative staff, faculty, and students formed (called the "Coalition to Save UMB") and issued a report authored by faculty calling on Massachusetts Governor Charlie Baker and the Massachusetts General Court to increase state funding to assist the university to service its debt from its campus renewal construction projects and increase capital investments for the university.

In November 2017, an audit commissioned by UMass System President Marty Meehan found that faulty record keeping, a lack of discipline in its budgeting process, and a failure on the part of UMass Boston administration to appreciate the cost of the campus renewal construction projects on the university's operating budget led to the university's $30 million budget deficit, and in the same month, the university laid off 36 employees after laying off about 100 non-tenure track faculty earlier in the year. In April 2018, University of Massachusetts Amherst and Mount Ida College administrators announced that the former school would acquire the latter's campus in Newton after the latter college's closure. The acquisition was immediately opposed by UMass Boston faculty and students due to inadequate consultation with the Boston campus faculty, the Boston campus' budget deficit, and that because of the proximity of the Mount Ida campus to the Boston campus, the faculty contended that the new campus would compete with the Boston campus. As of April 2018, the UMass Boston campus remained the sole campus in the UMass system with a majority-minority enrollment.

In May 2018, following the approval of the sale by the office of Massachusetts Attorney General Maura Healey, the UMass Boston Faculty Council passed a motion of no confidence in UMass System President Marty Meehan and the UMass System Board of Trustees. Ten days after three finalists for the UMass Boston chancellor position were named, on May 21, 2018, all three finalists withdrew from consideration after faculty members questioned the qualifications of the candidates. On June 20, 2018, UMass System Senior Vice President for Academic Affairs Katherine Newman was appointed as the university's interim chancellor. In September 2018, students moved into UMass Boston's first dormitory, and the university opened the free-standing parking garage adjacent to the Integrated Sciences Complex.

In February 2019, university campus employees protested an administration decision to increase the daily parking fee from $6 to $15 to cover the costs of the garage operation and other expenses. During the 2018–2019 academic year, UMass Boston was ranked by multiple publications as being among the best universities in the United States for veteran students. In May 2019, the Pioneer Institute released a white paper co-authored by former Massachusetts State Representative Gregory W. Sullivan that concluded that Chancellor Keith Motley and other UMass Boston administrators were scapegoated for the 2017 fiscal year $30 million budget deficit and that instead the approval by the System Board of Trustees of an accelerated 5-year capital spending plan in December 2014 and an error to a 5-year campus reserve ratio estimate were the cause of the $26 million in budget reductions implemented by interim Chancellor Barry Mills and that the reductions were made at the direction of the UMass Central Office.

Additionally, the white paper states that the 2017 audit was not conducted in accordance with Generally Accepted Government Auditing Standards or reported in accordance with auditing standards, and that the purchase of Mount Ida College in April 2018 was conducted by a wire transfer from the UMass System for $75 million without being included on the previously approved university capital plan at the time the UMass Central Office ordered the budget reductions rather than UMass Amherst purchasing the Mount Ida campus with loanable funds to be repaid with interest. The following month, interim Chancellor Katherine Newman issued a press statement disputing the findings of the white paper. In September 2019, the UMass Boston Faculty Staff Union President addressed the UMass System Board of Trustees to protest the potential offering of equivalent programs at the Mount Ida campus that are already offered at the Boston campus. The following December, the UMass Boston Faculty Staff Union President presented the board with a petition from the Boston campus faculty reiterating their concerns about the Mount Ida campus and requesting more input into its planning.

In February 2020, Marcelo Suárez-Orozco was unanimously appointed as the new permanent chancellor of the university. In September 2021, the UMass System Board of Trustees Chair announced that a $15 million endowment would be established for the UMass Boston College of Nursing and Health Sciences as part of a $50 million personal donation to the UMass System (the largest in its history) by the System Board of Trustees Chair and his wife. In January 2023, the Manning College of Nursing and Health Sciences received $3 million in federal funding for a home care digital and simulation lab. In July 2023, UMass Boston and Mass General Brigham announced an agreement to provide $20 million in funding for a workforce pipeline program in the Manning College of Nursing and Health Sciences. In December 2023, New Balance announced a $10 million grant to expand a sports leadership program at the university into a full institute on the campus that the company provided a $5 million grant to create in 2018. Pursuant to a report issued by the Boston Public Health Commission, Chancellor Suárez-Orozco and Boston Mayor Michelle Wu announced a $2.5 million partnership between the university and the Boston Public Schools in March 2024 to create a behavioral health training program to place 263 UMass Boston students in district schools and create a workforce pipeline for BPS students seeking behavioral health careers. In September 2024, university administration announced a new admissions and transfer program in partnership with Bunker Hill Community College.

== Campus ==
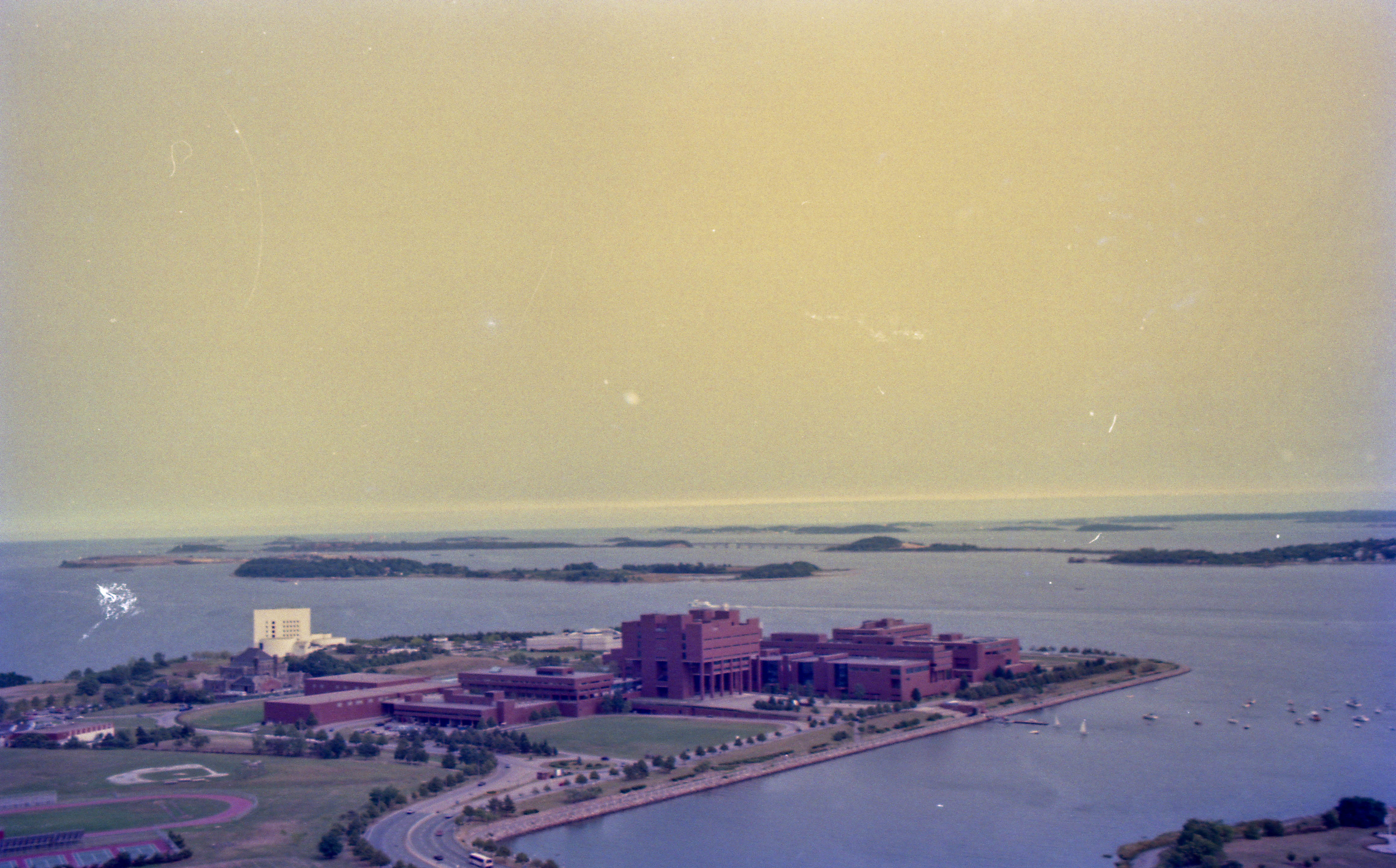
Aerial view of the UMass Boston campus in September 1993.

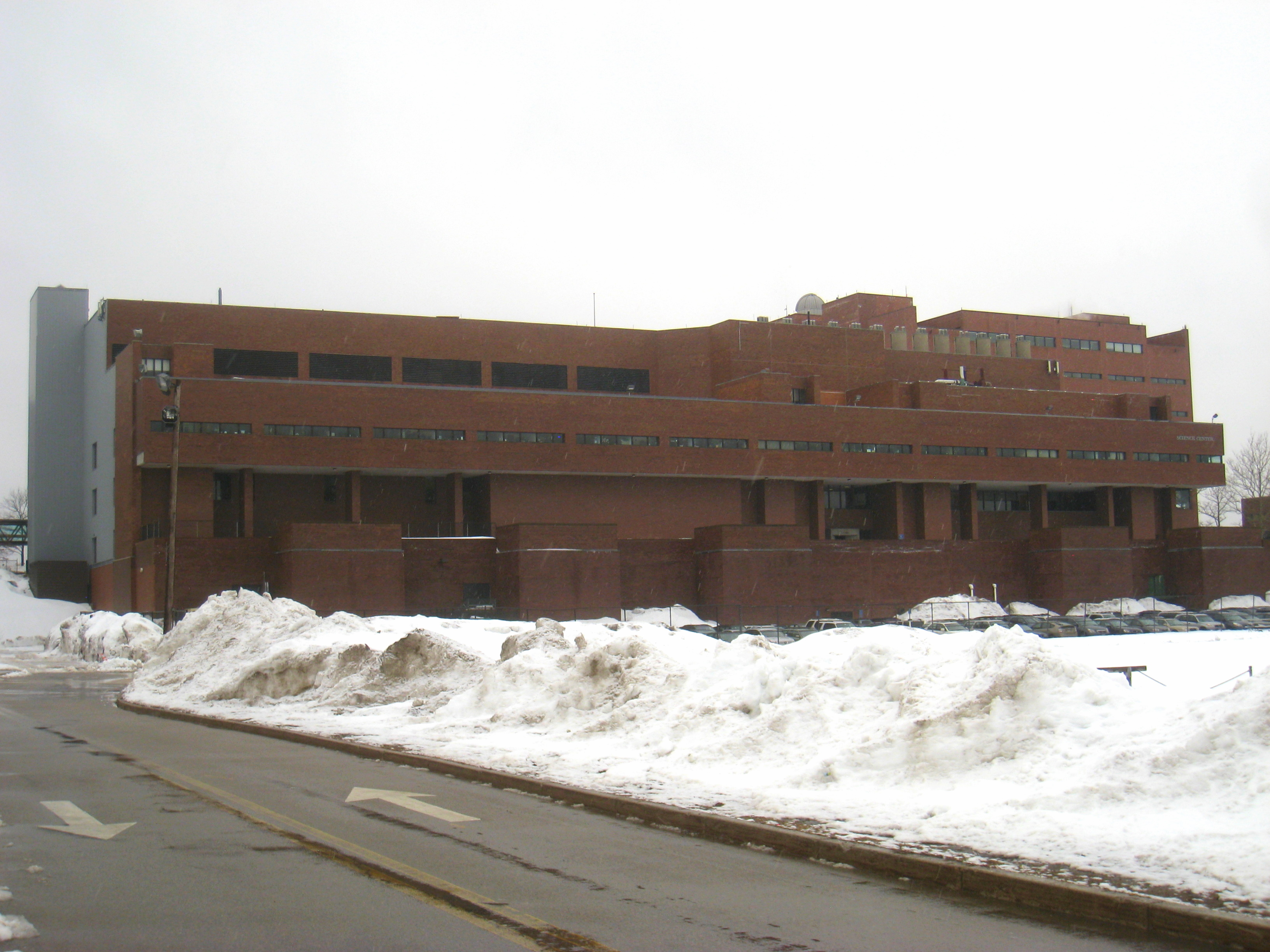
The Science Center was one of the original Columbia Point campus buildings opened in 1974. Demolished in 2020.

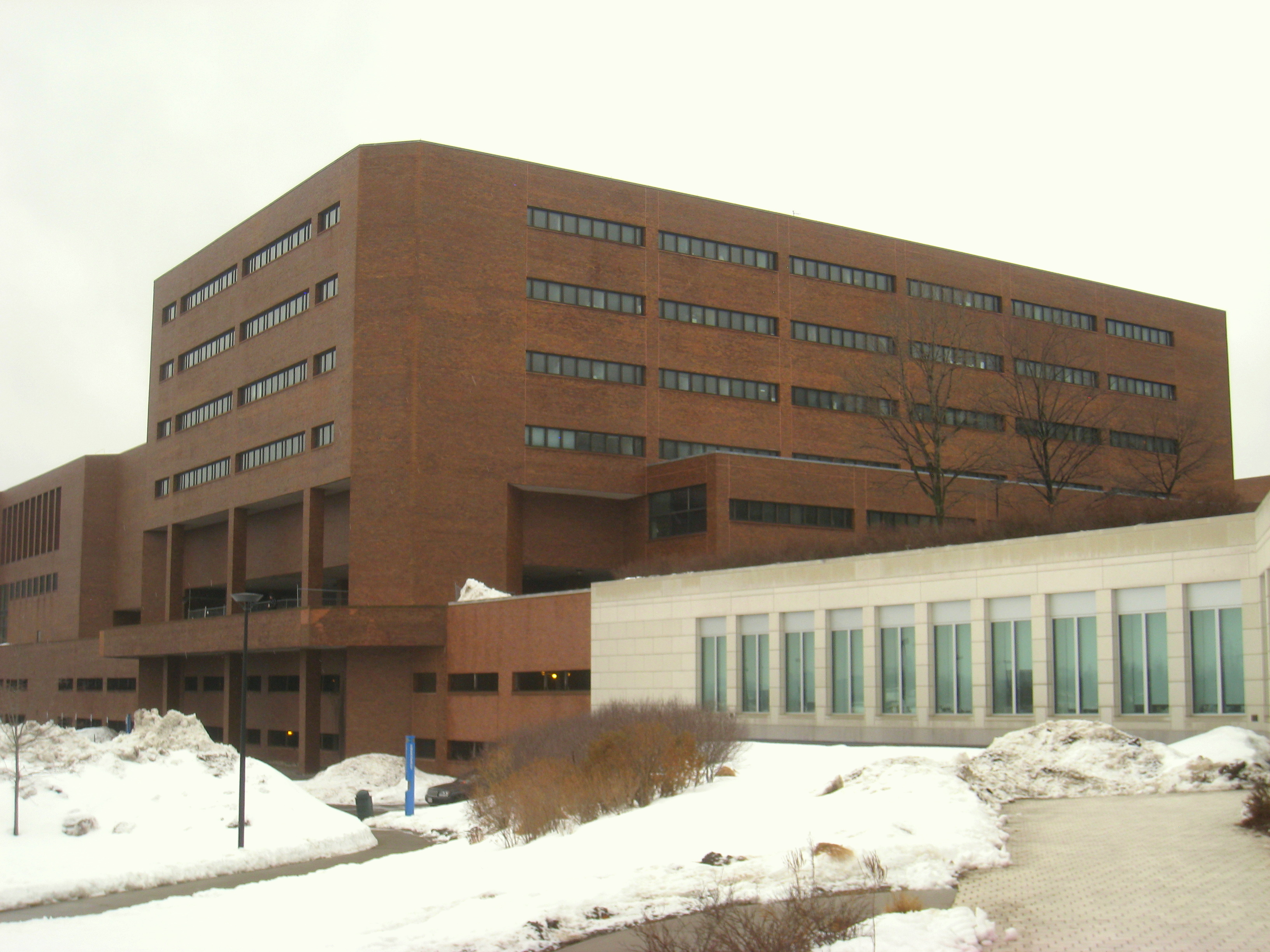
Wheatley Hall is also one of the original Columbia Point campus buildings opened in 1974. Named for poet Phillis Wheatley.

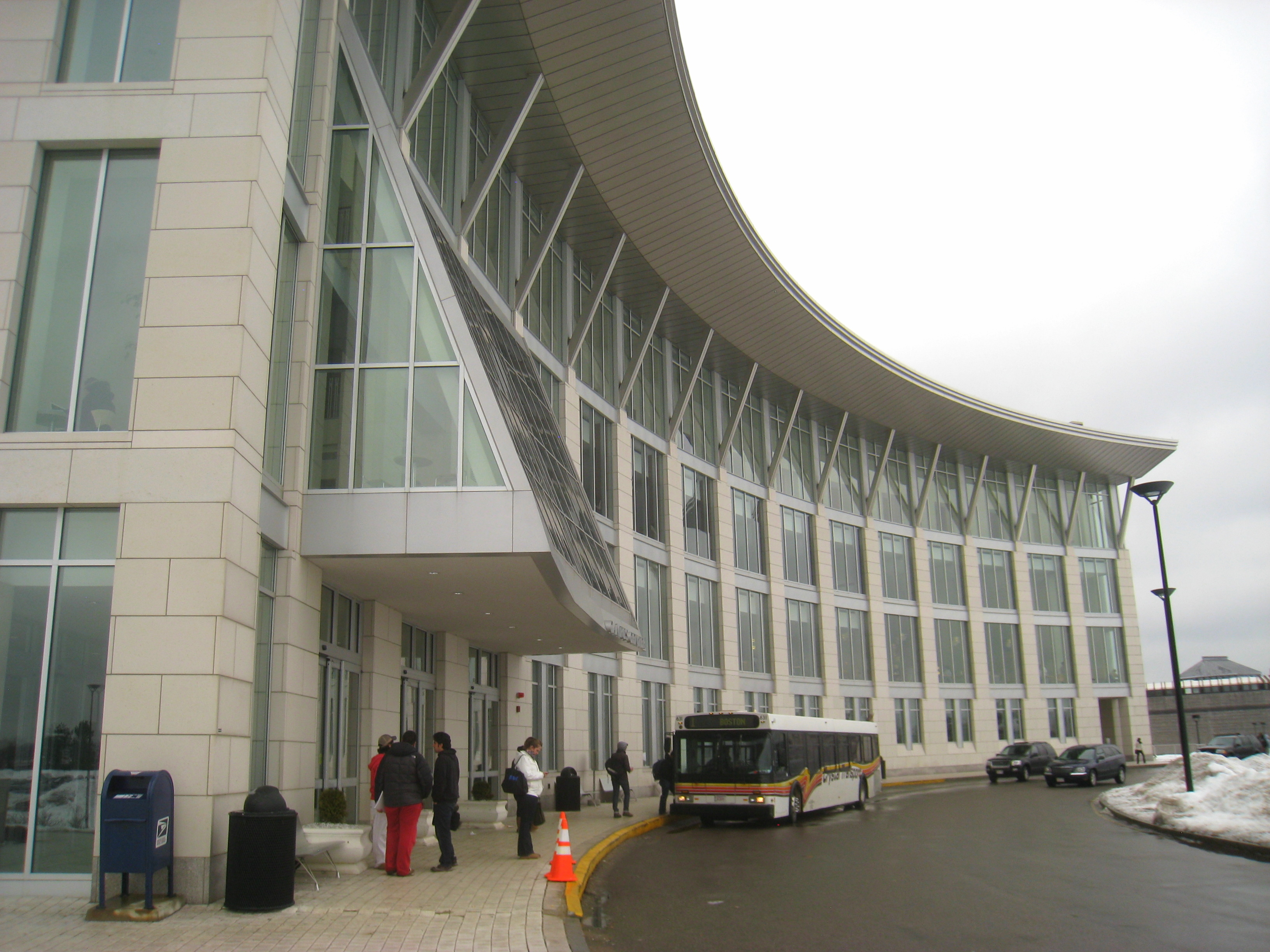
The current Campus Center opened in 2004 and was the first new facility constructed on the Columbia Point campus since the Clark Athletic Center opened in 1979.

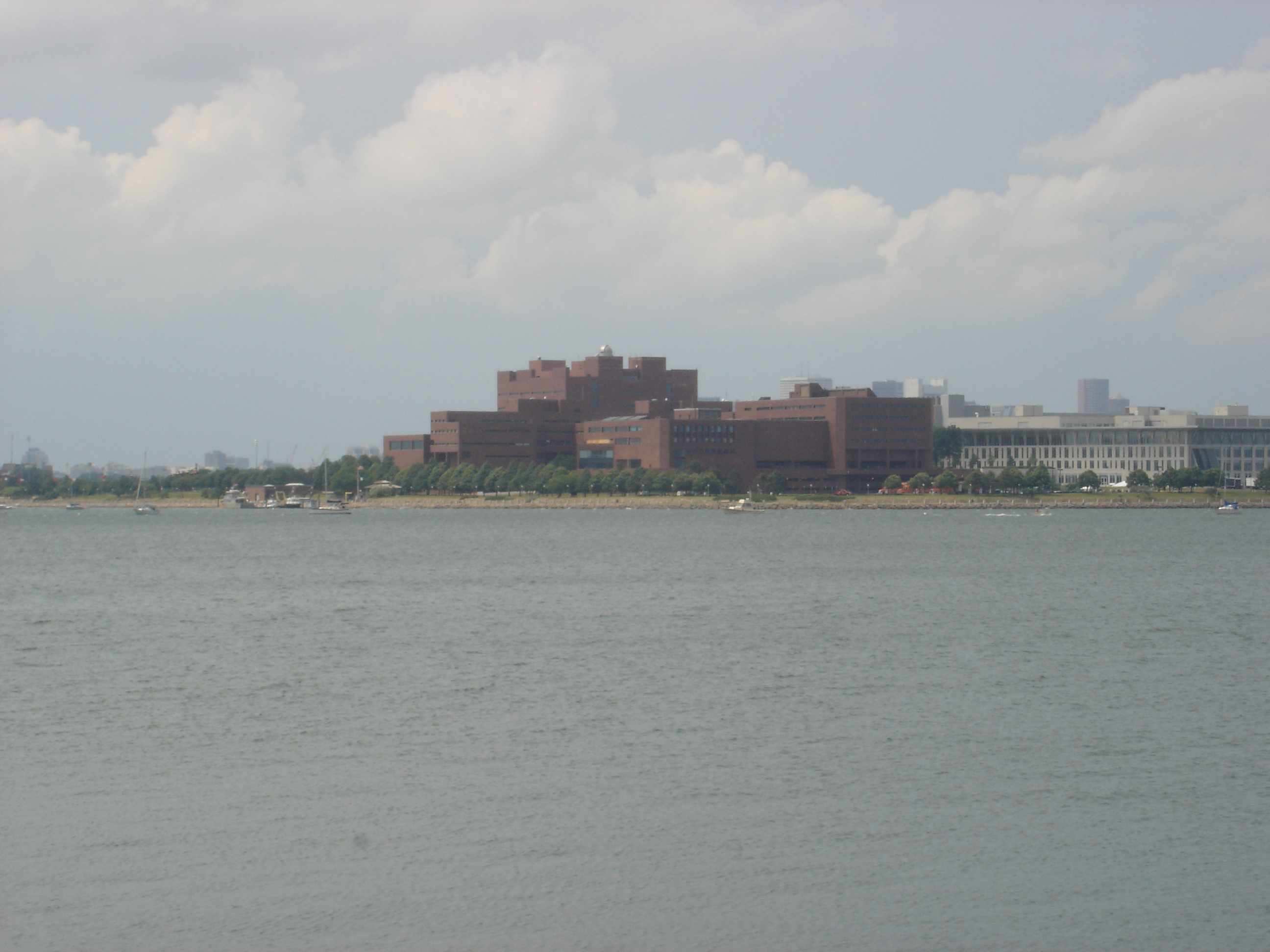
The UMass Boston campus from Squantum Point Park in Quincy in June 2008. The brick building in the foreground is Wheatley Hall and the white building to its right is the Campus Center.

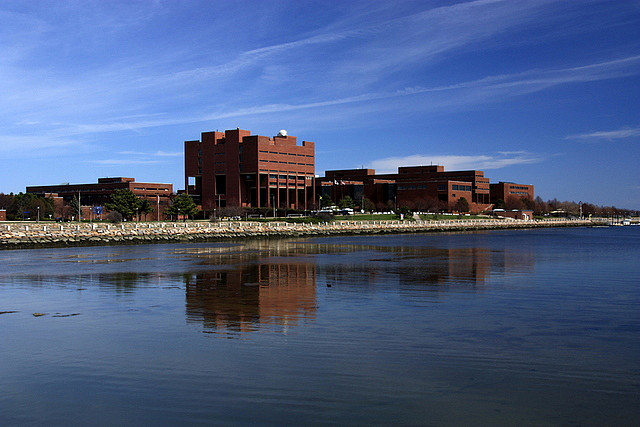
The UMass Boston campus in April 2009 from the Morrissey Boulevard entrance. From left to right, the buildings are the Quinn Administration Building, the Healey Library, and McCormack Hall.

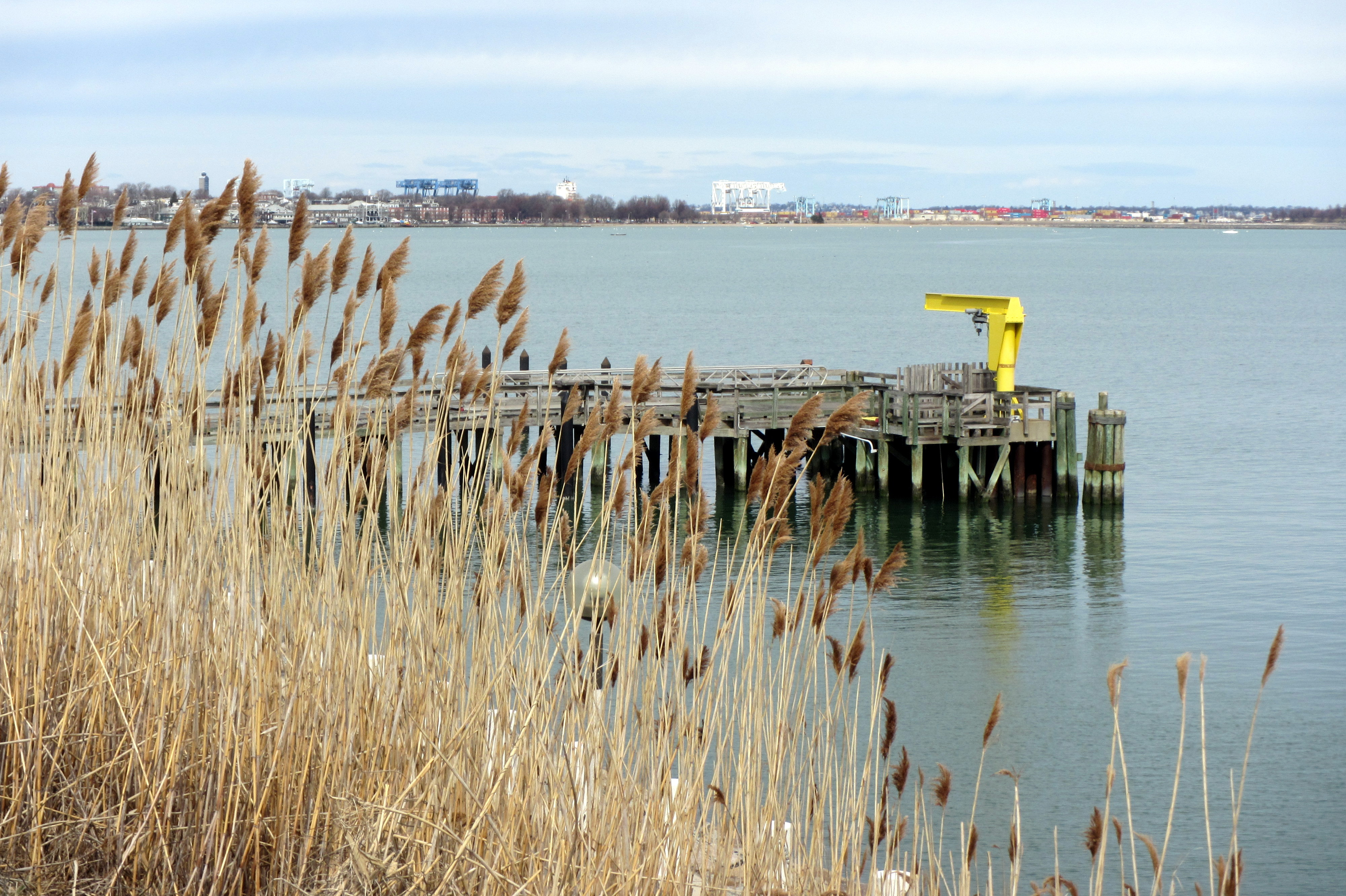
The John T. Fallon State Pier behind the JFK Presidential Library that is operated by the UMass Boston Division of Marine Operations in March 2013.

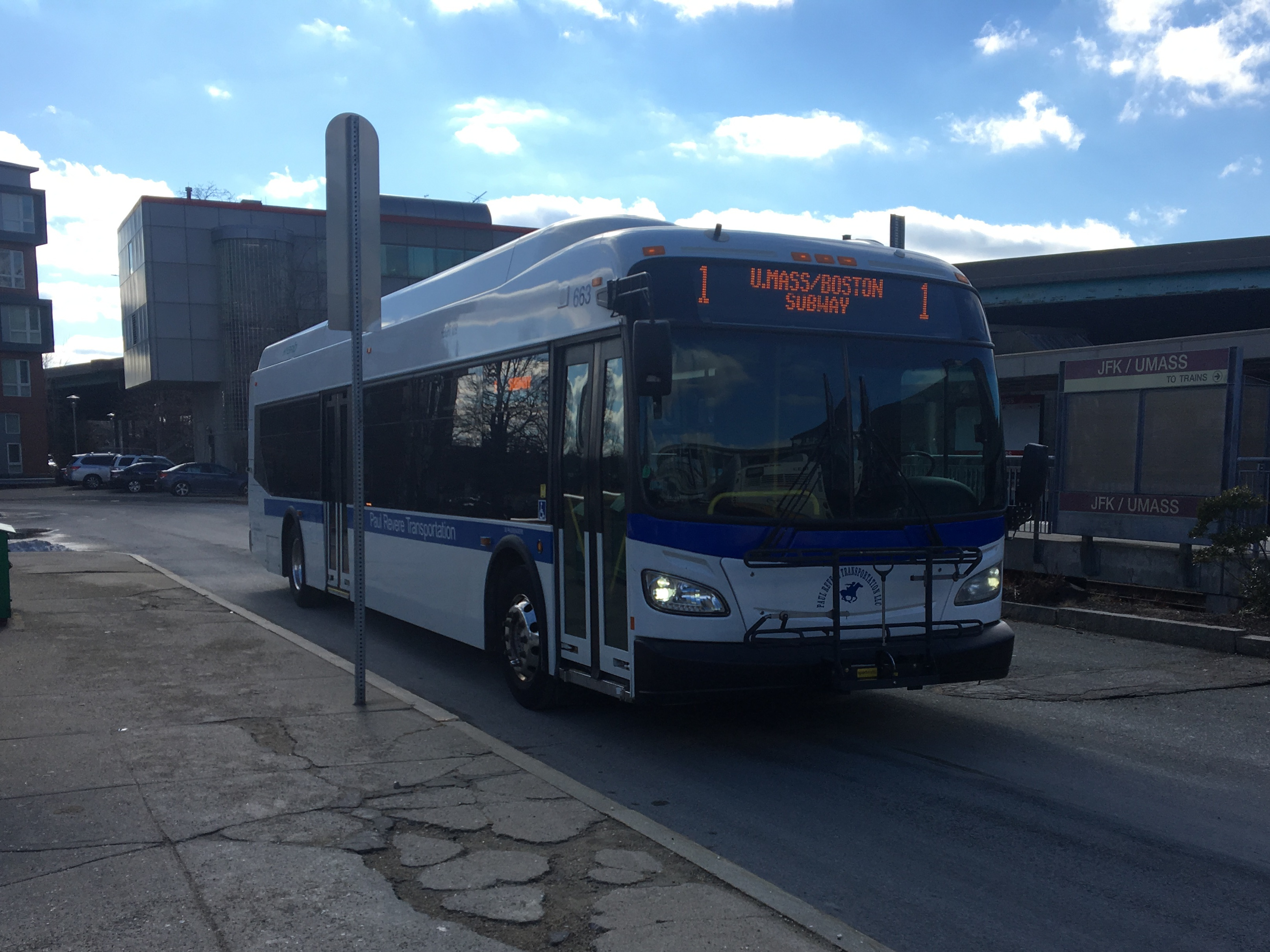
UMB shuttle bus with direct service to the Campus Center at JFK/UMass station in January 2019.

UMass Boston is located off Interstate 93 and within one mile of JFK/UMass station, which is served by the Red Line and three MBTA Commuter Rail lines. A shuttle is available from the MBTA station to campus.

=== 1960s campus siting controversy ===
Where UMass Boston would locate its campus permanently was a contentious dispute during the university's early history in the 1960s. The conflict emerged in 1965, not long after the university was initially founded: UMass President John W. Lederle had insisted upon a campus inside the city limits of Boston, while Boston Mayor John F. Collins publicly asked Chancellor John W. Ryan not to consider a permanent site in Downtown Boston, as a disproportionate amount of the valuable real estate there was already owned by many colleges and other non-profit institutions exempt from the city government's property taxes. In 1954, only one new private office building had appeared on the city skyline since 1929, one in five of the city's housing units were classified as dilapidated or deteriorating and the city was ranked lowest among major cities in building starts, while the only growing industries in the city were government and universities (leading to a narrowing tax base) and the city already had a higher number of municipal employees per capita than any major city in the United States.

In addition to Mayor Collins, the Boston business community, the Massachusetts General Court, WBZ radio, the editorial board of The Boston Globe, and residents of the South End were also opposed to a permanent downtown campus. Nonetheless, when the university purchased the building at 100 Arlington Street in 1966, many faculty and students interpreted the transaction as a signal that the university intended to settle permanently in Park Square. A proposal popular among students and faculty to build a high-rise academic building overlooking the Massachusetts Turnpike in Copley Square was cancelled when the John Hancock Insurance Company purchased the land and built John Hancock Tower there instead. Another proposal for a campus in the Highland Park area of Roxbury also met with opposition from residents. Other proposals to locate the permanent campus near Fenway Park, or South Station and Chinatown, or on golf courses for sale in Newton, were considered but rejected by Chancellor Ryan due to insufficient space or commuting concerns.

In 1967, the Boston Redevelopment Authority (BRA) published a study, titled An Urban Campus by the Sea, which proposed building the campus on the Columbia Point peninsula. The site was a former landfill, adjacent to the largest and poorest public housing complex in New England, and a mile from the MBTA's Columbia station. The proposal was deeply unpopular among the faculty and students; 1,500 of them subsequently organized a rally in November 1967 on Boston Common demanding a downtown location in Copley Square. In April 1969, when the Students for a Democratic Society organized its opposition rally, the student leaders denounced the university as "a 'pawn' masking the Boston Redevelopment Authority's plan to remove poor people from Columbia Point" and that "the university is planning a prestigious dormitory school with high tuition which students from low- and moderate-income families–whom the university was designed to serve–will not be able to attend."

Chancellor Ryan also opposed the Columbia Point proposal, who before he resigned in February 1968, made a counterproposal for a 15-acre campus south of where John Hancock Tower was being built that the BRA rejected. Architectural consultants of the university also scouted land near North Station and adjacent to the Boston Garden that was immediately opposed both by the ownership of the Boston Garden-Arena Corporation that owned the Boston Bruins (who threatened to move the team out of the city) and Boston Mayor Kevin White. In August 1968, after Francis L. Broderick was appointed the university's chancellor, now Speaker of the Massachusetts House of Representatives Robert H. Quinn, Massachusetts Senate Majority Leader Kevin B. Harrington, and State Senator George Kenneally all urged the UMass Board of Trustees to accept the Columbia Point proposal, while Chancellor Broderick asked the board to delay its decision at an October 1968 meeting by one month so that he might be able to deliver a final counterproposal (while another rally at the Massachusetts State House of 2,500 faculty and students still demanded a Copley Square or Park Square location).

In November 1968, Chancellor Broderick proposed a scattered-site campus of office buildings situated along the MBTA's Green Line in the South End that would be jointly owned by the university and businesses while retaining the original Arlington Street building. However, while the UMass Board of Trustees and UMass President John W. Lederle argued instead for a unified campus on Columbia Point, they allowed a task force an additional month to more fully study Broderick's proposal. In the end, after reviewing the task force's white paper at a meeting in December 1968, the UMass Board of Trustees voted 12 to 4 to accept the Columbia Point proposal.

=== Initial construction and MBM scandal ===
Beginning in 1970, the construction of the Columbia Point campus was the largest public capital construction project in the history of Massachusetts (exceeded only later by the Big Dig). The state government hired a single construction management firm, McKee-Berger-Mansueto (MBM), to supervise six other architectural firms and construction companies to complete the project by September 1973. The construction had multiple delays: the Boston Edison Company had not finished its electrical work, and because the site was a former landfill (that had only been closed since 1963), a concrete and brick substructure (where all of the campus mechanical systems would run conduits) undergirded by hundreds of driven piles needed to be constructed before the buildings, but pile driving released methane from the former landfill, requiring construction workers to halt production while each release of methane dispersed.

The Columbia Point campus was originally composed of five buildings connected by a series of skyways on the second floors of the buildings: McCormack Hall, Wheatley Hall, the Science Center, the Healey Library (which was designed by Chicago modernist architect Harry Weese), and the Quinn Administration Building. To transport students from Columbia station, the MBTA concluded that constructing a skyway from the station to the campus would be too expensive, and the university administration set about planning a shuttle bus system, funded by parking fees. Campus facilities would rise from the bottom of the substructure and the bottom of the substructure would provide entry to a parking garage with 1,600 spaces. Because the campus was surrounded on three sides by a bay, exposed to sea breeze and winter storms, the salt water in the atmosphere and the road salt carried from automobiles would eventually damage parts of the substructure beyond feasible and cost-effective repair.

Because the university was underneath flight paths arriving at Logan International Airport, all of the original Columbia Point campus buildings were soundproofed, and because of this, the classroom and offices in the buildings were designed as interior spaces with no windows, and the entrance to every building faced inward onto the campus plaza. Due to the campus being uniformly built of brick and the campus positioned above the landscape, the campus became known as "The Fortress", "The Rock", or "The Prison" colloquially. The buildings were rumored to have been designed by architects familiar with the architectural design of prisons (such as Weese, who designed the Chicago Metropolitan Correctional Center), but also designed so that the plaza could easily be occupied by the National Guard to suppress demonstrations and protests. In 1974, the $350 million capital construction budget for erecting more buildings on the campus was frozen due to the 1973–1975 recession, halting any further expansion of the campus. Construction for the Clark Athletic Center (that included an ice hockey arena, swimming pool, and basketball courts) broke ground in 1978 and was completed in 1979.

In 1977, McKee-Berger-Mansueto, Inc. (MBM), the company contracted to supervise the construction of the campus, came under public scrutiny after its contract with the Commonwealth was criticized in a series of newspaper articles for being abnormally favorable towards MBM, and a special legislative committee (led by Amherst College President John William Ward) was formed to investigate the contract. A scandal erupted after it was learned MBM paid Massachusetts Senate Majority Leader Joseph DiCarlo and State Senator Ronald MacKenzie $40,000 in exchange for a favorable report from the committee. DiCarlo and MacKenzie were convicted of extortion. Newspaper columnist Charles Pierce summarized the careless and negligent quality of MBM's construction projects unearthed by the Ward Commission's investigation as follows:

Besides the Worcester jail with the cells that did not lock, there was the auditorium at Boston State College in which the stage was not visible from a third of the seats and the library at Salem State College in which the walls were not sturdy enough to bear the weight of the books. At the UMass-Boston campus, ground zero of the scandal, school officials were forced to erect barricades to keep passerby from being brained by the bricks that kept falling off the side of the library. Unsurprisingly, a completely corrupt system had produced completely shoddy buildings that the taxpayers, already fleeced once, would have to pay to repair.

=== Campus renewal ===
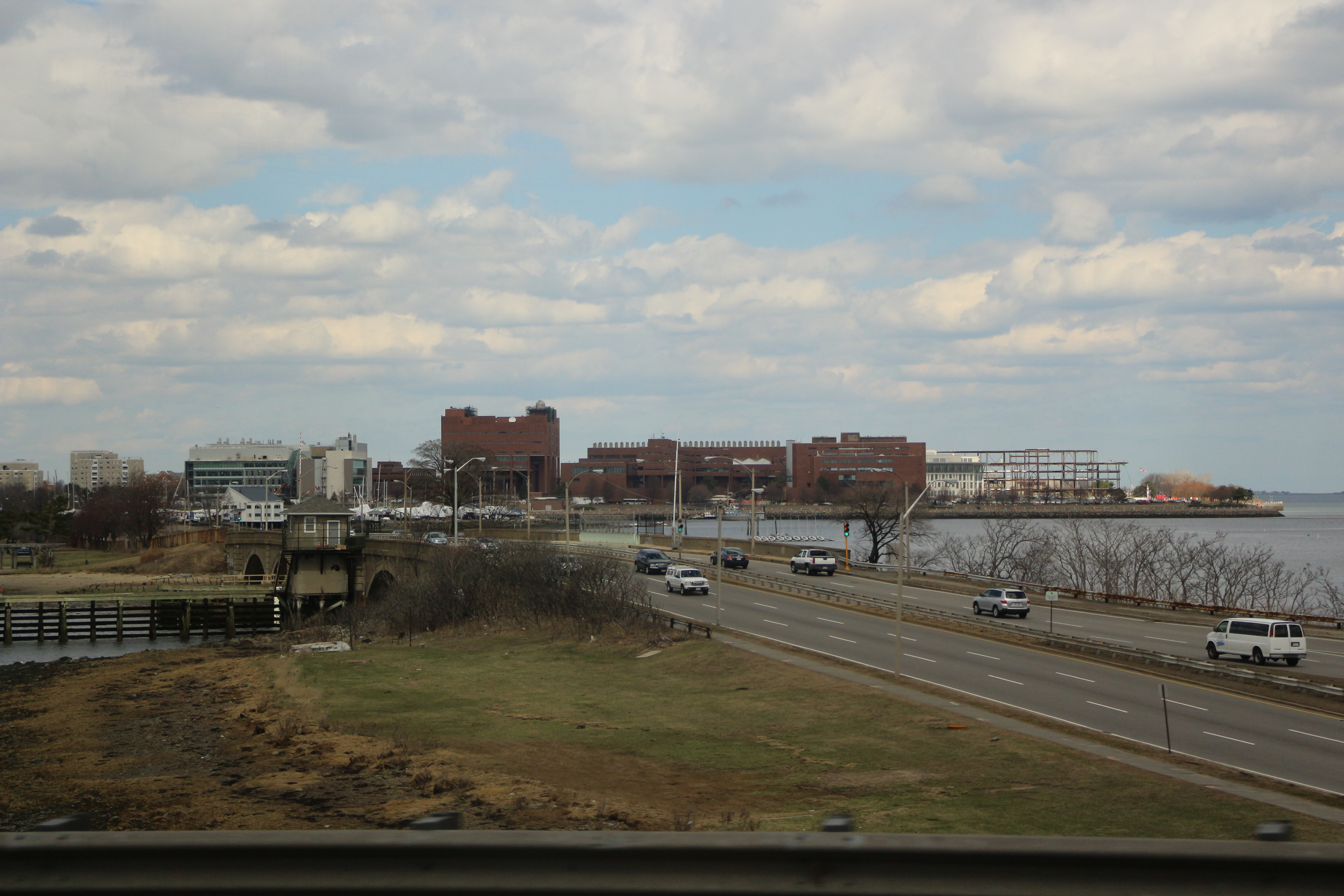
UMass Boston and Morrissey Boulevard from the I-93/US-1/MA-3 concurrency in Dorchester in April 2014 with the construction of the Integrated Sciences Complex nearing completion and the construction of University Hall underway.

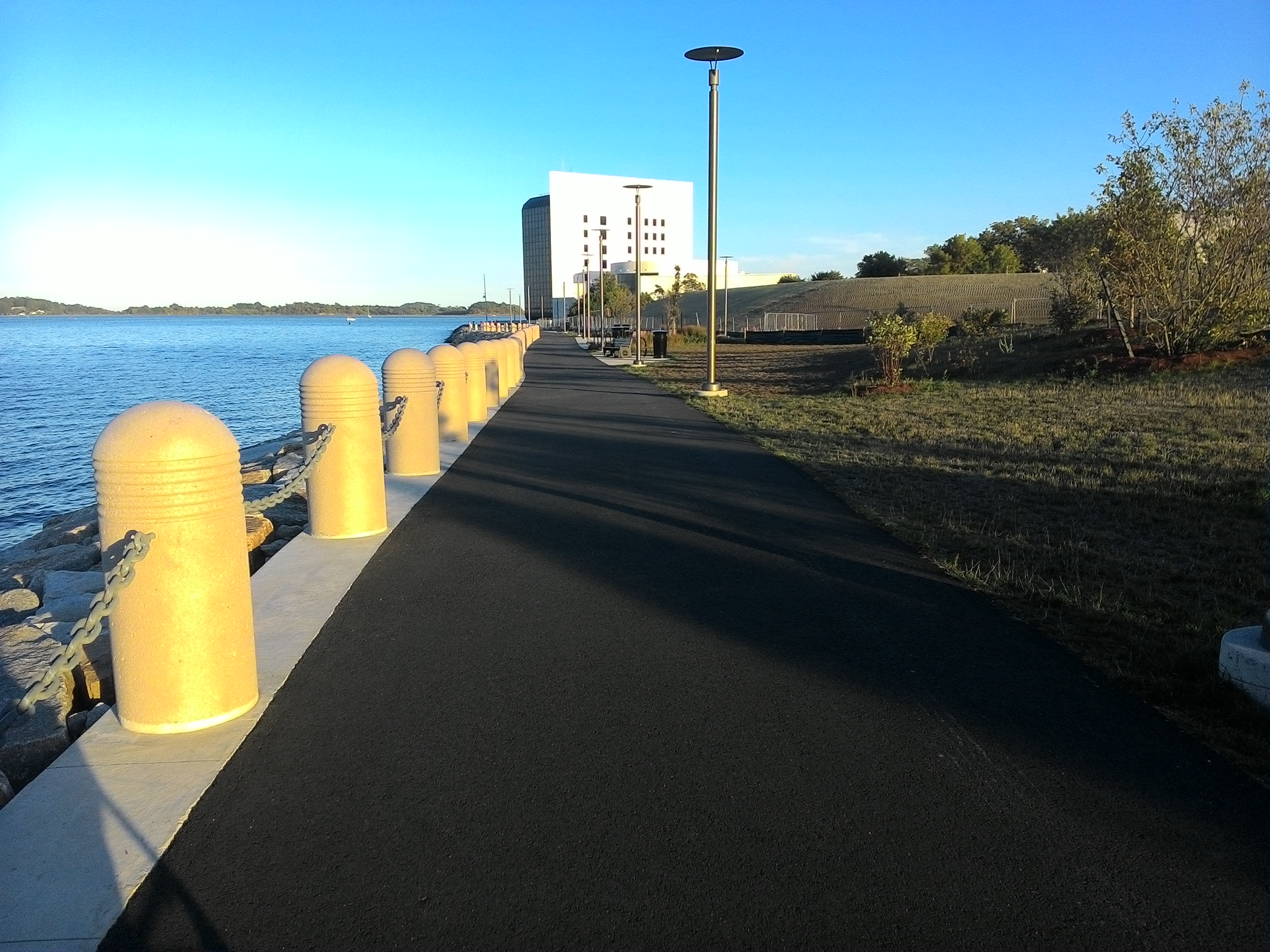
The JFK Presidential Library from the Boston Harborwalk walkway paved by the university's Harborwalk Shoreline and Stabilization Project completed in 2015.

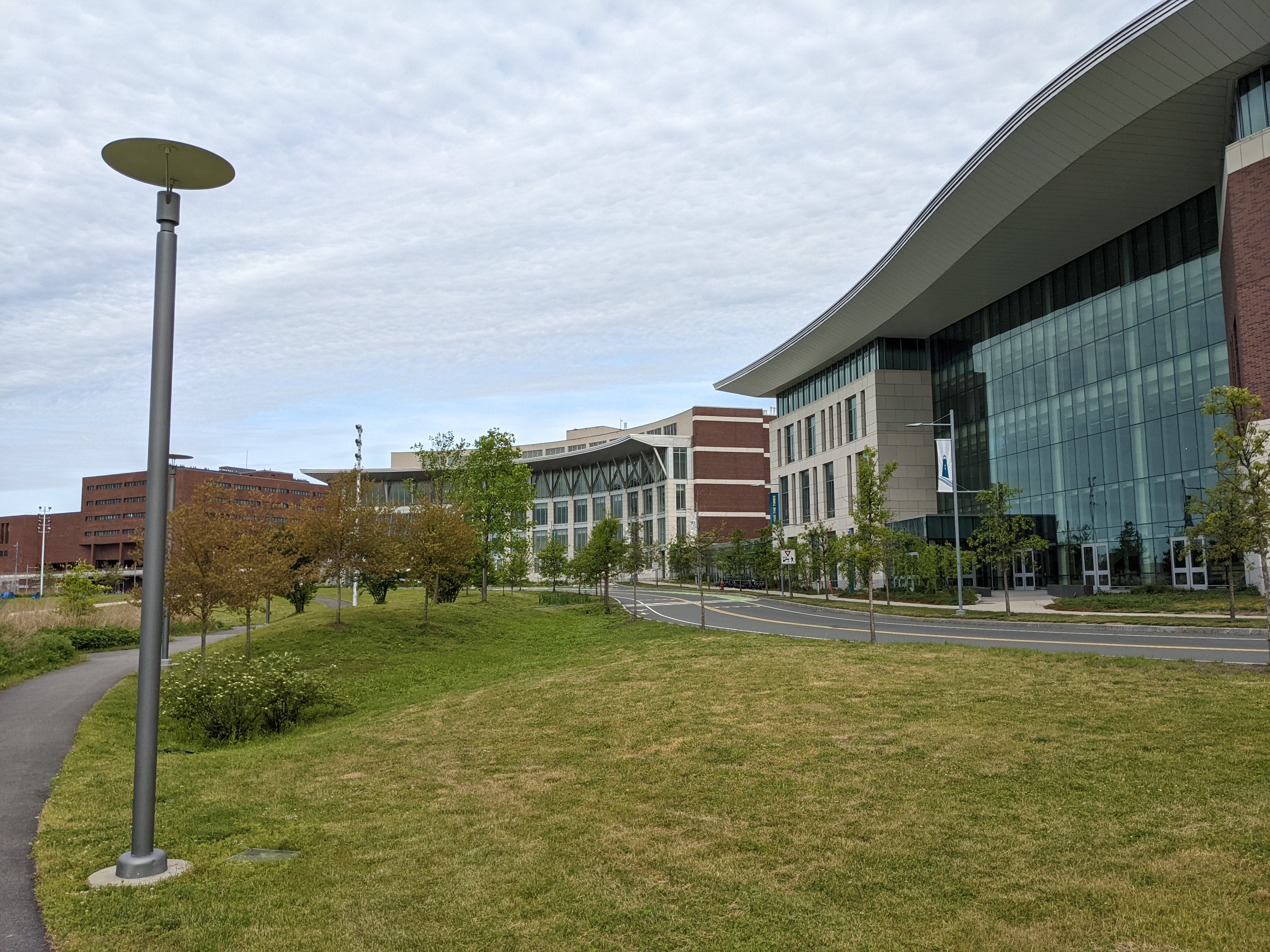
University Hall (opened in 2016), the Campus Center, and Wheatley Hall in May 2022.

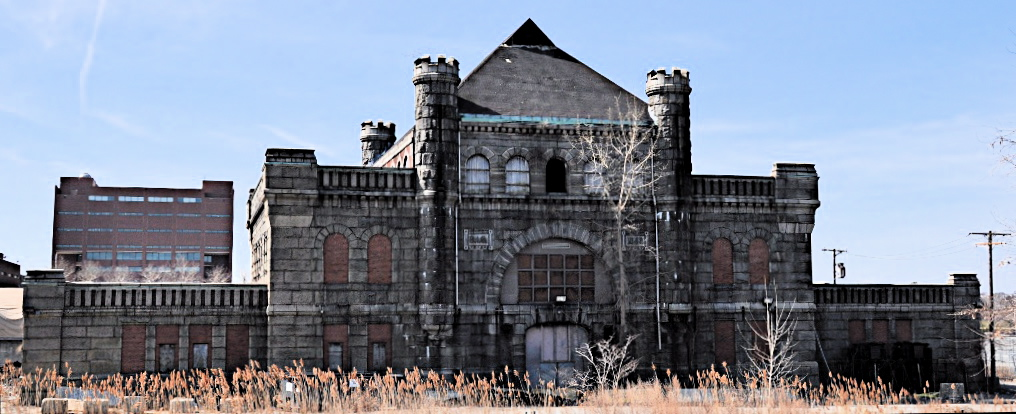
Located on the UMass Boston campus, the Calf Pasture Pumping Station Complex was listed in the U.S. National Register of Historic Places in 1990. Built in 1883, it is the only remaining 19th century building on Columbia Point.

On July 19, 2006, Chancellor Michael F. Collins ordered the immediate and permanent closure of the substructure parking garage, causing a loss of 1,500 parking spaces. Two days later, an article in The Boston Globe summarized the deterioration of the facility:

The University of Massachusetts at Boston has closed an underground parking garage that has been decaying for decades. ... Over the years, the garage has become a dreary labyrinth, with walls and floor so eroded from the salty environment that they look like a coral reef. Nets hang from the ceiling to catch fragments of falling cement, a problem linked to the use of low-quality concrete in the construction.

Chunks of concrete had been falling from the garage ceiling since the 1990s, and when Chancellor Collins ordered the closure, 600 spaces had already been lost due to ongoing repairs and rerouting of passenger and vehicular traffic. Because of the salt water atmosphere and the road salt from vehicles, the steel reinforcing bars embedded in the campus substructure concrete walls and ceiling became severely degraded, and because all of the campus mechanical systems had run conduits through the substructure, many of those systems could not be repaired and the damage was causing outages of the computer, electrical, heat, and air-conditioning equipment. An engineering report indicated that to repair the garage such that it would be safe for parking would cost $150 million. On October 2, 2006, the university began the process of creating a master plan to renew the campus. In 2010, a 385-pound section of the garage ceiling below Wheatley Hall fell.

By December 14, 2007, Chancellor J. Keith Motley presented a 25-year master plan to the UMass System Board of Trustees, who accepted the plan in full. Included in the 25-year master plan was the proposal to erect the university's first residential facilities that would accommodate 2,000 students, but not with the intention of changing the character of the university from a commuter school to a residential school. Eight months later on August 7, 2008, Massachusetts Governor Deval Patrick signed a higher education bond bill with $100 million directed towards the construction of a new integrated sciences complex at the Morrissey Boulevard entrance of the university's campus, a second $100 million directed towards constructing a general academic building, and the following week, U.S. Senator Ted Kennedy from Massachusetts announced that he would accelerate his plans to construct the Edward M. Kennedy Institute for the United States Senate on Columbia Point next to his brother's presidential library.

In December 2009, a report prepared for the state government on the 25-year master plan was released outlining future campus development and construction projects. By 2013, with the construction of the EMK Institute underway on April 8, 2011, the construction of the Integrated Sciences Complex underway on June 8, 2011, renovations to the Clark Athletic Center's gymnasium from March to December 2012, construction for a second academic building (University Hall) underway on February 27, 2013, and a utility corridor and roadway network project begun in the spring of 2013, the university's campus became "a multi-site construction zone." Other completed or current projects include:

- A $2.8 million project begun the previous summer to stabilize an eroded 800-foot segment of the Dorchester Bay shoreline with 3,200 tons of stone (including a significant amount of granite unearthed by the Big Dig that was donated by the Massachusetts Department of Transportation), pave a new walkway along the Boston Harborwalk in between the JFK Presidential Library and the Harbor Point Apartments with new benches, lighting, gathering spaces, and an artwork display area that was completed in July 2015;
- A $164 million project to develop a new utility corridor and roadway network led by BVH Integrated Services, Inc. and built by Bond Brothers that was completed in 2019;
- A $45 million project managed by Hill International, designed by CannonDesign, and built by Consigli Construction to renovate Wheatley and McCormack Halls, the Quinn Administration Building, and the Healey Library to relocate programs from the original Science Center (to facilitate its demolition) that was completed in January 2020;
- A $78 million project to repair the substructure parking garage that was completed by February 2023;
- A $137 million project managed by Hill International and designed by NBBJ to demolish the original Science Center, the university swimming pool building, the majority of the campus substructure and plaza adjoining those facilities, and to construct a campus quadrangle and 300-space parking lot in their place, which began in July 2020 and was completed in 2024;
- A second general-purpose academic building (General Academic Building No. 2), which received $100 million in state funding in 2012 and that is to be built next to Wheatley Hall in between University Drives South and East and the Campus Center bus stop;
- A project to restore the Calf Pasture Pumping Station Complex and to construct a mixed-use facility on an adjacent 10-acre site for which the UMass Building Authority issued a request for information in January 2020, received eight proposals in response by the following September, and issued a request for proposal in July 2021.

In June 2021, Chancellor Suárez-Orozco initiated the development of an updated campus master plan. In October 2018, Boston Mayor Marty Walsh announced a comprehensive climate change adaptation proposal to protect the Boston Harbor coastline from flooding. In October 2020, the Walsh administration released a 174-page climate change adaptation report for the Boston Harbor coastline in Dorchester with a section on Columbia Point and Morrissey Boulevard.

=== Columbia Point buildings ===
- Calf Pasture Pumping Station – Originally built and designed by Boston Architect George Albert Clough in 1883, the sewage treatment plant is currently being evaluated by UMass Building Authority for redevelopment.
- Healey Library – Original Columbia Point campus building opened in 1974. Named for Joseph P. Healey, UMass System Board of Trustees Chair (1969–1981).
- McCormack Hall – Original Columbia Point campus building opened in 1974. Named for John W. McCormack, Speaker of the U.S. House of Representatives (1962–1971).
- Quinn Administration Building – Original Columbia Point campus building opened in 1974. Named for Robert H. Quinn, Speaker of the Massachusetts House of Representatives (1967–1969) and UMass System Board of Trustees Chair (1981–1986).
- Science Center – Original Columbia Point campus building opened in 1974. The facility was demolished as part of a $137 million project to construct a campus quad and 300-space parking lot in its place that began in July 2020.
- Wheatley Hall – Original Columbia Point campus building opened in 1974. Named for Revolutionary War-era and first-published African-American female poet Phillis Wheatley.
- Clark Athletic Center – Broke ground in 1978 and completed in 1979. On October 3, 2000, hosted the first debate between Texas Governor George W. Bush and Vice President Al Gore during the 2000 U.S. presidential election.
- Campus Center – Broke ground in 2001 and completed in 2004. The building was designed by the Boston-based architectural firm Kallmann McKinnell & Wood and built by the Suffolk Construction Company at a cost of $80 million.
- Integrated Sciences Complex – Broke ground in 2011 and completed in 2015. The building cost $182 million to construct, was designed by the Boston-based architectural firm Goody Clancy, and was constructed by Walsh Brothers.
- Monan Park – Broke ground and completed in 2015. The construction was supported by a $2 million gift from the Yawkey Foundation, was built with the exact dimensions of Fenway Park, and was named for Boston College President J. Donald Monan, SJ. Jointly owned with Boston College High School.
- University Hall – Broke ground in 2013 and opened in 2016. The building cost $130 million to construct, was designed by the Boston-based Wilson Architects, and was constructed by the Gilbane Building Company.
- Motley Residence Hall – Broke ground in 2016 and opened in 2018. The 1,077-bed residence halls cost $120 million to construct, was led by Capstone Development Partners, built by Shawmut Construction, and designed by Elkus Manfredi Architects. In April 2023, university administration dedicated the dormitories in honor of former Chancellor J. Keith Motley and his wife.
- Parking Garage West – Broke ground in 2017 and opened in 2018. The 1,400-space free-standing parking garage cost $69 million to construct, was managed by Skanska, built by the Suffolk Construction Company, and designed by Fennick McCredie Architecture.

=== Off-campus facilities ===
UMass Boston's Institute for New England Native American Studies and Institute for Community Inclusion (UMass Boston's joint program with Boston Children's Hospital that is part of the national Association of University Centers on Disabilities) have their main offices on the fourth floor of the Bayside Office Center at 150 Mount Vernon Street, which is adjacent to the former Bayside Expo Center and down the street from the main campus. UMass Boston's Early Learning Center that is accredited by the National Association for the Education of Young Children is located at 2 Harbor Point Boulevard in the Harbor Point Apartments complex adjacent to the campus. UMass Boston's Biology Department and School for the Environment also have a field station on Nantucket.

In 2009, the Bayside Expo Center property was lost in a foreclosure to a Florida-based real estate firm, LNR/CMAT, and on May 19, 2010, the university purchased the property to use as campus facilities and to recoup 1,300 parking spaces after the closure of the campus substructure parking garage in 2006. In January 2018, the UMass Building Authority put the university's Bayside Expo Center property up for sale. In February 2019, the UMass System Board of Trustees unanimously approved a 99-year final lease agreement for the Bayside Expo Center with Accordia Partners for $192 million to $235 million.

== Academics ==
Distribution of UMass Boston undergraduate student body by college (2017–2018)
College	Undergraduate Major	Bachelor's Degrees Conferred
Liberal Arts	4,845 (39.12%)	1,130 (42.40%)
Science & Mathematics	3,252 (26.26%)	382 (14.33%)
Management	2,066 (16.68%)	528 (19.81%)
Nursing & Health Sciences	1,642 (13.26%)	476 (17.86%)
Education & Human Development	260 (2.10%)	71 (2.66%)
School for the Environment	258 (2.08%)	66 (2.48%)
Advancing & Professional Studies	51 (0.41%)	6 (0.23%)
Public & Community Service	12 (0.10%)	4 (0.15%)
University Totals	12,386 (100.00%)	2,665 (100.00%)

The university confers bachelor's, master's, and doctoral degrees, and also operates certificate programs and a corporate, continuing, and distance learning program. There are eleven schools and colleges at UMass Boston: the College of Liberal Arts, College of Science and Mathematics, School for the Environment, College of Management, College of Nursing and Health Sciences, College of Public and Community Service, College of Education and Human Development, John W. McCormack Graduate School of Policy Studies and Global Studies, School for Global Inclusion and Social Development, Honors College, and College of Advancing and Professional Studies (CAPS).

The university is a member of the Urban 13 universities, alongside schools like Temple University and the University of Pittsburgh. The university maintains a partnership with the University of International Relations, a university with ties to the Ministry of State Security of the People's Republic of China.

Academic rankings

National
- Forbes: 278
- U.S. News & World Report: 213 (tie)
- Washington Monthly: 130

Global
- QS: 951-1000
- THE: =112
- U.S. News & World Report: 747 (tie)

In the 2017–2018 academic year, the five most popular majors at the university were Management, Biology, Psychology, Exercise and Health Sciences, and Nursing. Within the College of Liberal Arts, the five most popular majors were Psychology, Criminal Justice, Economics, Communication Studies, and English. Within the College of Science and Mathematics, the five most popular majors were Biology, Computer Science, Biochemistry, Mathematics, and Electrical Engineering. Within the College of Management, the five most popular concentrations were Accounting, Finance, Marketing, Information Technology, and International Management. The five most popular minors at the university were Psychology, Sociology, Economics, Criminal Justice, and English (tied with Biology).

=== Undergraduate admissions ===
In 2025, the university accepted 83% of undergraduate applicants with those enrolled having an average 3.5 high school GPA. The university does not require submission of standardized test scores, but they will be considered as part of an application if submitted. Those enrolled who submitted test scores had an average 1190 SAT score (28% submitting scores) or an average 27 ACT score (2% submitting scores).

=== Accreditation ===
UMass Boston is accredited by the New England Commission of Higher Education. Additionally, the College of Management is accredited by the Association to Advance Collegiate Schools of Business (AACSB), and the College of Nursing and Health Services holds accreditation from the National League for Nursing Accreditation Commission and the Commonwealth of Massachusetts Board of Registration in Nursing. The Family Therapy Program is accredited by the Commission on Accreditation of Marital and Family Therapy Education (COAMFTE).

=== Faculty ===
UMass Boston faculty by tenure status and college (2015–2016)
College	Total (Note: The percentages in this column are the ratios of the total number of faculty members in a college relative to the number of faculty members in the university as a whole.)	Part-Time (Note: The percentages in this column are the ratios of part-time faculty members in the college relative to the total faculty members of the individual college.)	Non-Tenure Track (Note: The percentages in this column are the ratios of non-tenure track faculty members in the college relative to the total faculty members of the individual college.)	Tenured/Tenure-Track (Note: The percentages in this column are the ratios of tenured or tenure-track faculty members in the college relative to the total faculty members of the individual college.)
Liberal Arts	489 (39.34%)	174 (35.58%)	102 (20.86%)	213 (43.56%)
Science & Mathematics	172 (13.84%)	46 (26.74%)	36 (20.93%)	90 (52.33%)
Nursing & Health Sciences	142 (11.42%)	92 (64.79%)	23 (16.20%)	27 (19.01%)
Education and Human Development	123 (9.90%)	68 (55.28%)	9 (7.32%)	46 (37.40%)
Management	119 (9.57%)	37 (31.09%)	21 (17.65%)	61 (51.26%)
McCormack Graduate School	56 (4.51%)	21 (37.50%)	6 (10.71%)	29 (51.79%)
Advancing & Professional Studies	51 (4.10%)	45 (88.24%)	6 (11.76%)	0 (0.00%)
Global Inclusion & Social Development	28 (2.25%)	19 (67.86%)	0 (0.00%)	9 (32.14%)
School for the Environment	23 (1.85%)	6 (26.09%)	3 (13.04%)	14 (60.87%)
Public & Community Service	16 (1.29%)	4 (25.00%)	0 (0.00%)	12 (75.00%)
University Totals (Note: The percentages in this row are the ratios of the total numbers of faculty members in each column's category relative to the number of faculty members in the university as a whole.)	1,243 (100.00%)	527 (42.39%)	210 (16.89%)	506 (40.71%)

In 2016, UMass Boston's faculty of 1,243 consisted of 182 tenure-track and 210 non-tenure-track professors. 96 percent of the faculty held the highest degree in their fields and the student-teacher ratio was 16:1. It includes poet Lloyd Schwartz (who was awarded the Pulitzer Prize for Criticism in 1994 and co-edited the Library of America's Elizabeth Bishop: Poems, Prose, and Letters in 2008), and Jill McDonough, translator and Slavic philologist Diana Lewis Burgin, linguist Donaldo Macedo, author Padraig O'Malley, feminist scholar Carol Cohn, economists Julie A. Nelson and Randy Albelda, philosophers Lynne Tirrell and Lawrence Blum, political scientists Leila Farsakh and Thomas Ferguson, psychologist Sharon Lamb, Monet expert Paul Hayes Tucker, biologist Kamaljit S. Bawa, and physicist Benjamin Mollow, discoverer of the Mollow triplet.

Former faculty members include biblical scholar Richard A. Horsley, chemist John Warner, evolutionary biologist Joan Roughgarden, feminist writers Beverly Smith and Christina Hoff Sommers, politician Mary B. Newman (namesake of the Mary B. Newman Award for Academic Excellence), historians Edward Berkowitz, James Green, Peter Linebaugh, William Andrew Moffett, Mark Peattie, and James Turner, literary scholar Carlo L. Golino (who served as the university's chancellor from 1973 to 1978), mathematicians Amir Aczel, Victor S. Miller, and Robert Thomas Seeley, computer scientist Patrick O'Neil, neurologist M. V. Padma Srivastava, novelists Jaime Clarke, Elizabeth Searle, and Melanie Rae Thon, philosopher Jane Roland Martin, poets Martha Collins and Sabra Loomis, political scientists Jalal Alamgir and Kent John Chabotar, clinical psychologist David Lisak, social psychologist Melanie Joy, and sociologists Benjamin Bolger and Robert Dentler.

== Institutes and centers ==
The following free-standing institutes and centers are administered by the Office of the Provost and Vice Chancellor for Academic Affairs.

- Center for Social Development and Education
- Center for Survey Research
- Institute for Asian American Studies (a member of the Asian American and Pacific Islander Policy Research Consortium)
- Institute for Community Inclusion
- Massachusetts Office of Public Collaboration
- The Mauricio Gastón Institute for Latino Community Development and Public Policy
- Urban Harbors Institute
- Venture Development Center
- William Joiner Institute for the Study of War and Social Consequences
- William Monroe Trotter Institute for the Study of Black Culture

The following university-wide institutes and centers are operationally managed by collective leadership teams appointed by the Provost and Vice Chancellor for Academic Affairs.

- Center of Science and Mathematics in Context
- Center for Personalized Cancer Therapy (a collaborative venture with the Dana–Farber/Harvard Cancer Center)
- Confucius Institute
- Developmental Sciences Research Center
- Institute for Early Education Leadership and Innovation
- Institute for International and Comparative Education
- Paul English Applied Artificial Intelligence Institute
- Sustainable Solutions Lab

The following institutes and centers are administered by their college or department.

- Adult Literacy Resource Institute
- Andrew Fiske Memorial Center for Archaeological Research
- Broadening Advanced Technological Education Connections
- Center for Coastal Environmental Sensing Networks
- Center for Collaborative Leadership
- Center for Environmental Health, Science, and Technology
- Center for Governance and Sustainability
- Center for Green Chemistry
- Center for Innovation and Excellence in eLearning
- Center for Innovative Teaching
- Center for Peace, Democracy, and Development
- Center for Portuguese Language – Instituto Camoes
- Center for Rebuilding Sustainable Communities after Disasters
- Center for Social and Demographic Research on Aging
- Center for Social Policy
- Center for Sustainable Enterprise and Regional Competitiveness
- Center for the Study of Gender, Security, and Human Rights
- Center for the Study of the Humanities, Culture and Society
- Center for Women in Politics and Public Policy
- Center for World Languages and Cultures
- Center on Media and Society
- China Program Center
- Edward J. Collins, Jr. Center for Public Management
- Entrepreneurship Center
- Gerontology Institute
- GoKids Boston Youth Fitness and Training Center
- Institute for Learning and Teaching
- Institute for New England Native American Studies
- Labor Resource Center
- New England Resource Center for Higher Education
- Osher Lifelong Learning Institute
- Pension Action Center
- The Massachusetts Small Business Development Center & Minority Business Center

== Athletics ==
Intercollegiate athletics, intramurals, and recreation for the students, staff, and faculty are the primary programs of the UMass Boston Department of Athletics. The department offers 20 varsity sports and is a member of the NCAA's Division III. UMass Boston, known by their nickname: the Beacons, has teams competing in the Little East Conference. The Beacons have been named All-Americans 93 times in seven sports. The women's indoor and outdoor track & field teams have won four NCAA team championships and 38 NCAA individual championships. In the years 1999 through 2006 the National Consortium for Academics and Sports named the Department of Athletics at UMass Boston first in the country for community service.

== Student activities ==
Undergraduate demographics as of Fall 2023
Race and ethnicity	Total
White	31%
Hispanic	20%
Black	18%
Asian	16%
International student	7%
Unknown	5%
Two or more races	4%
Economic diversity
Low-income (Note: The percentage of students who received an income-based federal Pell grant intended for low-income students.)	44%
Affluent (Note: The percentage of students who are a part of the American middle class at the bare minimum.)	56%

UMass Boston's independent, student run and financed newspaper is The Mass Media. Other student publications include the yearbook, Watermark arts and literary magazine (which ceased publication under that title in 2022/2023), and The Beacon monthly humor magazine. UMass Boston also owns and operates WUMB-FM (91.9), a 24-hour, public, noncommercial radio station that broadcasts folk music programs and produces the award-winning public and cultural affairs program, Commonwealth Journal.

National student societies or professional organizations with active local or student chapters at UMass Boston include Alpha Lambda Delta, the American Society for Biochemistry and Molecular Biology, College Democrats of America, Delta Sigma Pi, Free the Children, the Golden Key International Honour Society, the National Student Nurses' Association, Phi Delta Epsilon, the Public Interest Research Group, the Society for the Advancement of Chicanos/Hispanics and Native Americans in Science, the Society of Physics Students, and Young Americans for Liberty. The American Chemical Society had a student chapter at UMass Boston, but as of the Fall 2016 semester it is inactive. (Note: However, the American Chemical Society still certifies the Bachelor of Science in Chemistry degree at UMass Boston.)

== Notable alumni ==
- Joseph Abboud, B.A. 1972, International Men's Fashion Designer.
- Amsale Aberra, B.A. 1981, Celebrity Wedding designer.
- Paul Anastas, one of the founders of green chemistry, now faculty at Yale
- Cory Atkins, (B.S. 1979), Member of the Massachusetts House of Representatives (1999–2019).
- Panayiota Bertzikis, B.A. 2010, Humanitarian.
- Daniel E. Bosley, (M.S. 1996), Member of the Massachusetts House of Representatives (1987–2011).
- Edward Scott Bozek (1950–2022), Olympic épée fencer
- William Bratton, B.A. 1975, Boston City Police Commissioner (1993–1994), New York City Police Commissioner (1994–1996; 2014–2016), Los Angeles Police Department Chief (2002–2009), Member of the Homeland Security Advisory Council (2011–Present).
- Phillip Brutus, B.S. 1982, Member of the Florida House of Representatives (2001–2007).
- Christine Canavan, (B.S. Nursing (summa cum laude) 1988), Member of the Massachusetts House of Representatives (1993–2015).
- Ken Casey, bassist for the punk rock group the Dropkick Murphys.
- Lenny Clarke, (did not finish), comedian/actor.
- Tim Costello (1945–2009), labor and anti-globalization advocate and author.
- Paul Donato, Mayor of Medford, Massachusetts (1980–1985), Member of Massachusetts House of Representatives (2001–Present), Second Assistant Majority Whip of the Massachusetts House of Representatives (2009–Present).
- Paul M. English, B.A. 1987 and M.S. 1989 (both in Computer Science), co-founder and CTO of Kayak.com.
- Jennifer L. Flanagan, (B.S. Political Science, 1998), Member of the Massachusetts House of Representatives (2005–2009), Member of the Massachusetts Senate (2009–2017).
- Jovita Fontanez 1984, head of Boston Election Commission, member of Massachusetts Electoral College.
- Beth Harrington, filmmaker and musician
- Robert L. Hedlund, Member of the Massachusetts Senate (1991–1993; 1995–2016), Mayor of Weymouth, Massachusetts (2016–Present).
- Patricia D. Jehlen, (M.A. History), Member of the Massachusetts House of Representatives (1991–2005), Member of the Massachusetts Senate (2005–Present).
- John F. Kelly, B.A. 1976, general in the United States Marine Corps, commander of U.S. Southern Command (USSOUTHCOM) from 2012 to 2016. Former senior military assistant to the Secretary of Defense, former commander of Multi-National Force-West, Iraq, U.S. Secretary of Homeland Security (January–July 2017), White House Chief of Staff (July 2017–January 2019).
- Joseph P. Kennedy II, (B.A. 1976), current president of Citizens Energy Corporation and former member of the U.S. House of Representatives (1987–1999).
- Dennis Lehane, (did not finish), author.
- Ron Mariano, (M.Ed., 1972), Speaker of the Massachusetts House of Representatives (2020–Present), Member of the Massachusetts House of Representatives (1991–Present), Majority Leader of the Massachusetts House of Representatives (2011–2020).
- Juana Matias, state representative
- Gina McCarthy, (B.A., 1976), Administrator of the U.S. Environmental Protection Agency (2013–2017), White House National Climate Advisor (2021–2022)
- Michael J. McGlynn, (B.A. Political Science/History, 1976). Member of the Massachusetts House of Representatives (1977–1988), Mayor of Medford, Massachusetts (1988–2016).
- Thomas Menino, (B.A. Community Planning, 1988). Mayor of Boston (1993–2014), Boston City Council President (1993), Member of the Boston City Council (1984–1993).
- Janet Mills B.A. 1970, Maine Attorney General (2009–2011; 2013–2019), 75th governor of Maine (2019–).
- Michael J. Moran, (B.A. Economics, 1995), Member of the Massachusetts House of Representatives (2005–Present).
- Will Murray, author 80 novels, and hundreds of articles on popular culture
- Eileen Myles, B.A. Author.
- Kelly Overton, Activist.
- Stanzi Potenza, actor, comedian, and TikTok personality
- Joe Rogan, (did not finish), comedian, actor, "NewsRadio" and "Fear Factor".
- Jeffrey Sánchez, (B.A. Legal Education), Member of the Massachusetts House of Representatives (2003–2019).
- Debra Saunders, B.A. 1982, conservative columnist, White House Correspondent of the Las Vegas Review-Journal.
- Biz Stone, (did not finish) Co-founder of Twitter.
- Steve Sweeney, B.A. 1974, Comedian.
- John M. Tobin, Jr., (B.A. Political Science), Member of the Boston City Council (2002–2010).
- Harry Trask, B.A. 1969, (1928–2002) 1957 Pulitzer Prize in Photography (for a photograph of the SS Andrea Doria sinking).
- Robert Travaglini, B.S. 1974. President of the Massachusetts Senate (2003–2007), Member of the Massachusetts Senate (1992–2007), Member of the Boston City Council (1984–1992).
- Samuel Urkato, Minister of Science and Higher Education, Ethiopia.
- Bill Walczak, B.A. 1978. former CEO Codman Square Health Center and candidate for Mayor of Boston.
- John Warner, B.S. 1984, one of the founding fathers of Green Chemistry; founded first PhD program in Green Chemistry.
- Georgette Watson, B.A., anti-drug activist
- Jane Welzel, (1955–2014), pioneering long-distance runner
- Dana White, (did not finish), current president of the Ultimate Fighting Championship (UFC).
