= Joseph B. Berger =

American social scientist and academic

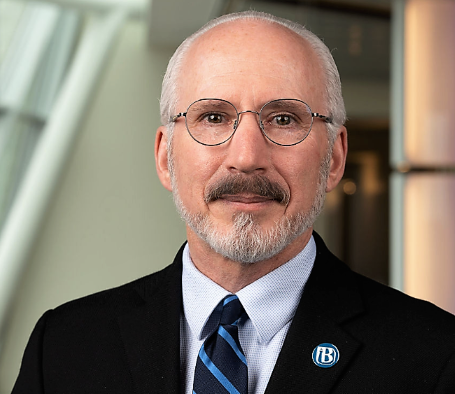

Academic background
- Education: Lawrence University; Bowling Green State University; Vanderbilt University

Joseph B. Berger is a social scientist and academic leader. He is a professor of education, and Provost and Vice Chancellor for Academic Affairs at the University of Massachusetts Boston.

Berger is most known for his research in the areas of higher education policy, leadership, organizational development, with a focus on improving tertiary educational systems, and examining the impact of higher education on key stakeholders.

== Education ==
Berger served as a student affairs administrator and enrolled at Lawrence University for a Bachelor of Arts in Anthropology and Sociology, and graduated in 1986. He then completed his MA in College Student Personnel from Bowling Green State University in 1990. He earned a Ph.D. in Education and Human Development — Higher Education Administration from Vanderbilt University in Tennessee in 1997.

== Career ==
Following his Ph.D., he was appointed assistant professor at the University of New Orleans, and held that position from 1997 till 1999. Subsequently, he joined the University of Massachusetts Amherst in 1999 as an assistant professor, was promoted to associate professor in 2003, held an appointment as an associate professor till 2010, and served as the professor in the Department of Educational Policy, Research, and Administration there from 2010 until 2017. He was the director of the Center for International Education in 2016 and 2017. Since 2017, he has been serving as the professor of education at the University of Massachusetts Boston.

From 2002 until 2011, he was the Chair of Educational Policy, Research, and Administration at the University of Massachusetts Amherst. Following that appointment, he served as the Associate Dean for Research and Engagement of the College of Education for five years, and held an appointment as Senior Associate Dean of the College of Education there in 2016. Berger also served as the Chair of the Global Higher Education and Research for the Worldwide Universities Network. In 2017, he was appointed Dean of the College of Education and Human Development, a position he held until 2021. As of 2021, he has been serving as the Provost (education) and Vice Chancellor for Academic Affairs at the University of Massachusetts Boston. As Provost, he has helped lead the creation of the For the Times strategic plan, reorganization of major academic units, improved student success, record-breaking sponsored research, and being recognized as a highest research activity (R1 status) university by the Carnegie Foundation, which also recognizes UMass Boston as the highest access R1 university in the United States.

== Research ==
Berger has authored numerous publications, including journal articles, book chapters, and research reports. His research is focused in the field of organization and leadership in higher education, with an emphasis on policy analysis in tertiary education and improvement of tertiary educational systems and institutions, both in national context and high-need international settings.

=== Educational leadership and organizational development ===
Berger's early works explored how leadership, organizational structures and public policies, particularly in the United States, influence college access, and success. He highlighted the significance of organizational attributes and demonstrated that they serve as a potential source of social integration using theory elaboration in one of his papers, Revising Tinto's interactionalist theory of student departure through theory elaboration: Examining the role of organizational attributes in the persistence process, co-authored with John M. Braxton Students' sense of community was also identified as a source of social integration. Together with Milem, he integrated Astin and Tinto's concepts to develop their own model of student persistence, characterizing time and effort as conditions for persistence because they attribute to student embeddedness and, thus, student persistence. Moreover, faculty teaching skills were also indicated as significant in influencing student's persistence, and it was reported upon the evaluation of faculty time allocation that faculty reward structure is not in line with developing educational environment that would encourage better outcomes for student. Later, he explored the relationship between organizational behavior and student outcomes. Having researched the organizational nature of student persistence, he contributed to the understanding of Tinto's theory of student departure, provided information on student persistence, and also presented recommendations on how to improve the effectiveness of retention efforts. Moreover, he investigated the impact of organizational structures in colleges and universities on college student learning as an outcome. His research also concentrated on Universal Instructional Design (UID), and provided a model to help campus leaders towards its implementation.

While exploring a number of dimensions of organizations’ cultures, Berger has also investigated how culture diversity in campus, and equity and access impacts the students. He was a co-creator to the development of the Inclusive Excellence framework, which demonstrates the role that diversity and inclusion play in the development of institutional excellence. His research has also established that diversity in institutions transforms students' attitudes and beliefs, motivates them to challenge their own prejudices, and results in action-oriented democratic outcomes.

=== Tertiary educational systems and institutions ===
More recently, Berger's research has focused on tertiary educational systems and institutions, and made contributions towards improving the post-secondary education system, particularly in the high-need international regions such as Afghanistan, Pakistan, the Philippines, Russia, and China. An aspect of tertiary education that holds prominence in his work includes addressing the issues associated with improving higher education in fragile regions, and also recommending effective policies that could help in tackling the challenges. He led research aimed at assessing the role of higher education in promoting stability in Afghanistan, illustrated the state of Afghanistan's higher education system in the aftermath of the Taliban's defeat in 2001, and described the existing challenges associated with developing institutional autonomy in Afghanistan. Based on his research, and projects conducted in different regions and cultures, the "User-inspired Research" serves as an approach for the needs assessment analysis for formulating, and implementing organizational and leadership development initiatives. Drawing on qualitative data, he assessed the models of educational management in post-secondary institutions based in Northwest China, characterized Chinese higher education by looking into its complexity, and diversity, and proposed models of organizations that could be adapted to their specific context. He also co-developed the Value Framework for global higher education which emphasizes the importance of balancing quality, access, relevance, and investment in the development of university and higher education systems.

== Selected awards and honors ==
- 2016 – Outstanding Leadership for Exceptional Commitment to Global Higher Education, Yoruba Elders International Society
- 2016 – Commendation for Higher Education Leadership, Governor of Rhode Island
- 2019 – Community Leadership Award, 3Point Foundation

=== Selected articles ===
- Milem, J. F., & Berger, J. B. (1997). A modified model of college student persistence: Exploring the relationship between Astin's theory of involvement and Tinto's theory of student departure. Journal of college student development, 38(4), 387.
- Berger, J. B., & Braxton, J. M. (1998). Revising Tinto's interactionalist theory of student departure through theory elaboration: Examining the role of organizational attributes in the persistence process. Research in Higher education, 39(2), 103–119.
- Berger, J. B., & Milem, J. F. (1999). The role of student involvement and perceptions of integration in a causal model of student persistence. Research in higher Education, 40(6), 641–664.
- Berger, J. B., & Milem, J. F. (1999). The role of student involvement and perceptions of integration in a causal model of student persistence. Research in higher Education, 40(6), 641–664.
- Berger, J. B. (2000). Optimizing capital, social reproduction, and undergraduate persistence: A sociological perspective. Reworking the student departure puzzle, 95–124.
