= Carlo de' Dottori =

Venetian baroque writer

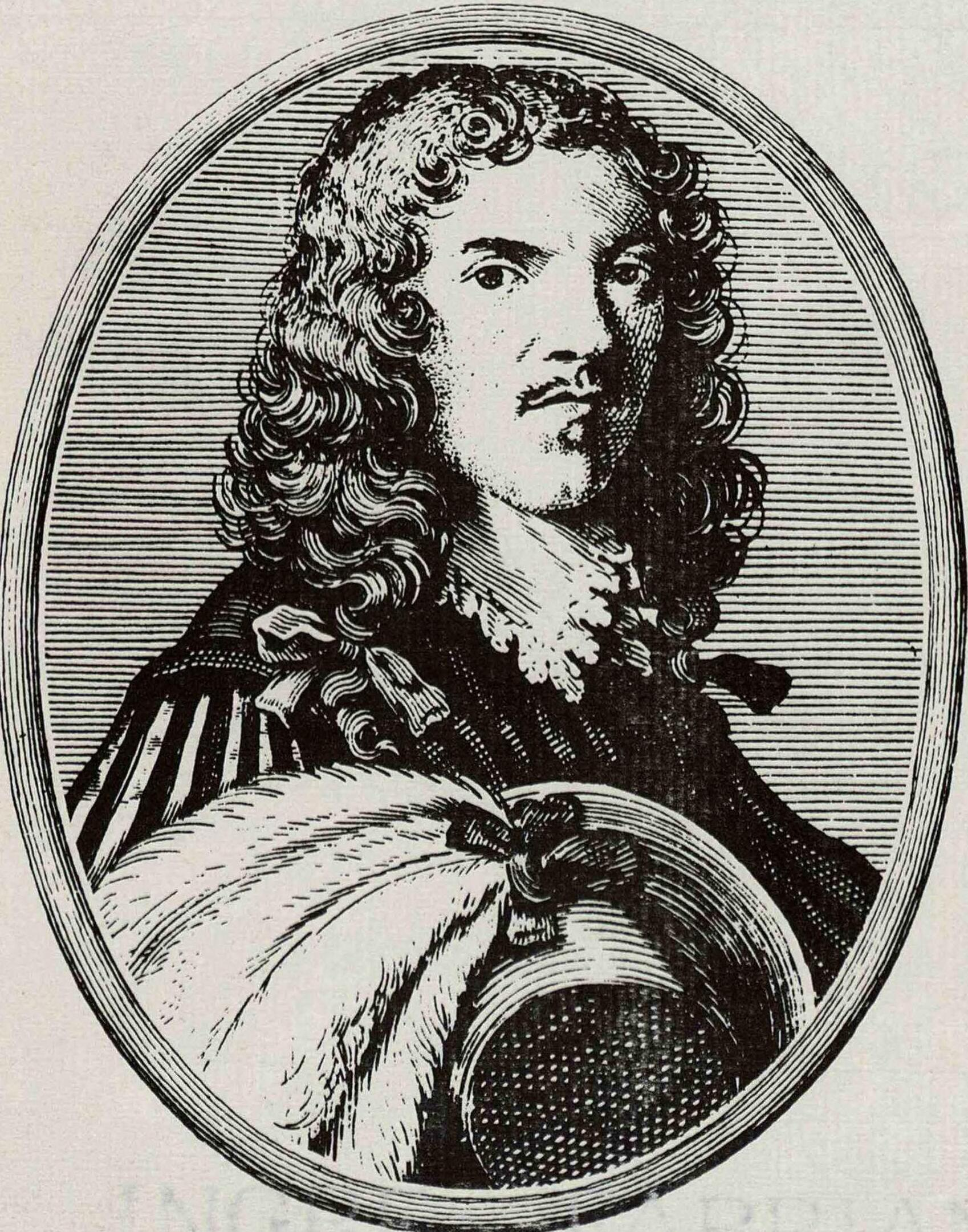
- Born: 9 October 1618; Padua, Republic of Venice
- Died: 23 July 1686 (aged 67); Padua, Republic of Venice
- Education: University of Padua
- Occupations: Poet; Intellectual
- Spouse: Lodovica Botton (m. 1644; died 1657)
- Children: 4
- Writing career
- Pen name: Eleuterio Dularete
- Language: Italian language
- Period: 17th century
- Genres: Poetry; Drama; Epic poetry
- Notable works: Aristodemo; L'Asino; Confessioni di Eleuterio Dularete
- Literary movement: Late Renaissance; Baroque

Carlo de' Dottori (Italian: [ˈkarlo de dotˈtoːri]; 9 October 1618 – 23 July 1686) is a Venetian writer, best remembered for his autobiographical Confessioni and his tragedy Aristodemo, considered by Benedetto Croce one of the masterpieces of Italian Baroque literature.

== Biography ==
Carlo de' Dottori was born in 1618 in Padua of a noble family. We know very little about his early life or education except for what he himself has to say in his works. Dottori received a thorough classical education. He attended the University of Padua, but he never completed his formal studies.

He held several posts in different cultural-political Paduan institutions and frequented the Accademia Galileiana, the most important Paduan academy of his time, of which he became a member in 1645. He was elected four times as Principe of the academy, in 1649, 1670, 1675, and 1677. During the 1650s, he made various efforts to obtain the protection to and patronage of some important figures outside the domain of the Republic of Venice. He spent most of his life as a court poet under the patronage of Eleonora Gonzaga, Christina of Sweden, and Leopold of Austria. He died at Padua in 1686. In his last years he composed a book of memoirs entitled Confessioni di Eleuterio Dularete, published posthumously (Venice, G. Albrizzi, 1696). In a memoria read before the Academy of Padua on June 5, 1792, Giuseppe Gennari spoke at length and admiringly of Dottori's life and works. This same memoria was then published, in a somewhat enlarged form, as a preface to an edition of L'Asino which appeared in 1796.

== Works ==
Dottori's first work is the novel Alfenore, which he wrote when he was only twenty. It is a hybrid sort of composition, revealing the influence of all the main trends of the time as well as the inexperience of the writer. Dottori's most famous work is the tragedy Aristodemo. Aristodemo is a tragedy in verse, which found its inspiration and its models in classical authors, especially Euripides. First performed in Padua on 31 May 1655, the play was published in 1643, and maintained a rather high rank on the Italian stage until the eighteenth century. Dottori also published, in 1643, Rime e Canzoni, which attained a second edition in 1689; and in 1652 he published the mock-heroic epos L'Asino (The donkey), which was lastingly successful. L'Asino is a mock-heroic poem, that is a satirical composition in "ottava rima" according to the well-established tradition of the seventeenth century. A comparison with Tassoni's La secchia rapita seems unavoidable at this point. The resemblance is strong but limited to external elements such as the thin historical basis common to both poems. In the case of L'Asino this basis goes back to the medieval struggle between Padua and Vicenza for the possession of a flag bearing the image of a jackass. Internally Dottori's poem differs significantly from Tassoni's. The bitterness and personal resentment of the latter are missing in L'Asino where the satirical mood is definitely benign. Dottori corresponded with Angelico Aprosio, and probably assisted in his Bibliotheca; he also exchanged letters on scientific subjects with Francesco Redi.

== List of works ==
- Poesie liriche di Carlo de' Dottori. All'illustriss. & ecc. sig. il sig. D'Hameaux ambasciadore per la Maestà cristianissima, appresso la Serenissima Republica di Venetia, In Padoa: per Paolo Frambotto, 1643.
- L'Alfenore del signor Carlo de' Dottori. Donato alle dame della sua patria, In Padova: per il Frambotto, 1644 (anche In Venetia: per Matteo Leni, e Giouanni Vecellio, 1644).
- Al serenissimo principe Francesco Molino per l'elezione di Sua Serenità. Oda di Carlo de' Dottori, In Padoua: per Giulio Criuellari, 1646.
- Le ode di Carlo de' Dottori. Prima, e seconda parte al serenissimo principe Leopoldo di Toscana, In Padoua: per il Criuellari, 1647.
- Canzoni del signor Carlo de' Dottori. Al sereniss. prencipe Rinaldo card. d'Este, In Padova: ad istanza di Andrea Baruzzi. Nella stamperia del Pasquati, 1650.
- L'asino. Poema eroicomico d'Iroldo Crotta. Con gli argomenti del Sig. Alessandro Zacco, e le annotazioni del sig. Sertorio Orsato, In Venezia: per Matteo Leni, 1652 (Google books).
- Aristodemo, tragedia di Carlo de' Dottori. All'altezza ser.ma del signor principe Leopoldo di Toscana, In Padoua: appresso Mattio Cadorin, 1657.
- Lettere famigliari del signor Carlo de' Dottori, In Padova: ad instanza di Andrea Baruzzi, 1658 (In Padova: per Gio. Battista Pasquati, 1658).
- Ode sacre e morali di Carlo de' Dottori alla maestà cesarea dell'imperadrice Leonora, Padova: nella stampa di Matteo Cadorino, 1659 (Padova: nella stampa di Matteo Cadorino, 1659).
- Orazione funebre-panegirica in morte di Madama Serenissima di Mantoua. Alla maestà cesarea dell'imperadrice figliuola di sua altezza, In Padoua: per Gio: Battista Pasquati, 1660.
- Le ode del signor Co. Carlo di Dottori in questa quarta impressione da lui rivedute, scelte, accresciute e divise in Eroiche, Funebri, Amorose, Morali e Sacre. In Padoua: per gli eredi di Paolo Frambotto, 1664 (Google books).
- Bianca drama tragico d'Eleuterio Dularete. Dedicato all'eccellenza del signor Girolamo Gradenigo capitano di Padova, In Padova: per Pietro Maria Frambotto, 1671.
- La Zenobia di Radamisto opera scenica del signor co. Carlo di Dottori. Dedicata all'illustrissimo signor Gio. Isaia Bar. de Hartig, In Venetia: per Gio. Francesco Valuasense, 1686.
- Ippolita, drama per musica, Comandato dalla Maestà cesarea dell'imperadrice al signor conte Carlo de' Dottori, In Padova: per Pietro Maria Frambotto, 1695.
- Confessioni di Eleuterio Dularete consacrate alla serenissima Elisabetta Valiera prencipessa di Venezia, In Padova: per Sebastiano Spera in Dio, 1696.
- Galatea: poema inedito; a cura di Domenico Manfrin, Padova: tipi del Seminario, 1850.
- Carlo de' Dottori (1987). Antonio Daniele (ed.). L'asino. Scrittori d'Italia Laterza. Bari: Laterza.

== Bibliography ==
- Carlo de' Dottori, Il Parnaso, edited, with introduction and notes, by Carlo L. Golino. University of California Publications in modern philology, Volume 48. University of California Press, Berkeley and Los Angeles, 1957.
- Golino, Carlo L. (1962). "Carlo De' Dottori and the Italian Baroque". Italica. 39 (1): 31–43. doi:10.2307/476935. JSTOR 476935.
- Santi, Victor A. (1982). "A few considerations on the "Aristodemo" of Carlo de' Dottori". Romance Notes. 23 (1): 106–112. JSTOR 43801885.
- Daniele, Antonio (1992). "DOTTORI, Carlo de'". Dizionario Biografico degli Italiani (in Italian). Vol. 41: Donaggio–Dugnani. Rome: Istituto dell'Enciclopedia Italiana. ISBN 978-88-12-00032-6.
- Diffley, P. (2002). "Dottori, Carlo De'". The Oxford Companion to Italian Literature. Oxford University Press.
- Zucchi, Enrico (2012). "O felici quei primi uomini rozzi: elementi pastorali nei cori dell'Aristodemo di Carlo de' Dottori". Tra boschi e marine: varietà della pastorale nel Rinascimento e nell'Età barocca. Bologna: CLUEB. pp. 579–605. doi:10.1400/207849.
