= Common Ground (Lukas book) =

1985 nonfiction book by J. Anthony Lukas

- First edition
- Author: J. Anthony Lukas
- Language: English
- Subject: Race relations in the United States
- Publisher: Alfred A. Knopf
- Publication date: 1985
- Publication place: United States
- Awards: National Book Award (1985); Pulitzer Prize (1986)
- ISBN: 978-0-394-41150-7
- Dewey Decimal: 370.19/342
- LC Class: F73.9.A1 L85

Common Ground: A Turbulent Decade in the Lives of Three American Families is a nonfiction book by J. Anthony Lukas, published by Alfred A. Knopf in 1985, that examines race relations in Boston, Massachusetts, through the prism of desegregation busing. It received the Pulitzer Prize for General Nonfiction, the National Book Award for Nonfiction, and the National Book Critics Circle Award.

In addition to the family stories, Common Ground examines many of the issues related to busing, including the protest movements, the disaffection between the "two-toilet" Irish middle class and their working-class brethren, the impact of busing on national politics, and the evolution of the city's newsmedia.

A television miniseries based on the book aired in 1990.

== Content ==
The book traces the history of three families: the working-class African-American Twymons, the working-class Irish McGoffs, and the middle-class Yankee Divers. It gives brief genealogical histories of each families, focusing on how the events they went through illuminated Boston history, before narrowing its focus to the racial tension of the 1960s and the 1970s. Through their stories, Common Ground focuses on racial and class conflicts in two Boston neighborhoods: the working-class Irish-American enclave of Charlestown and the uneasily integrated South End.

Each family is directly involved in the busing crisis. The McGoffs are proud residents of Charlestown who see an attempt to change the dynamics of their school as an assault on their families. The Twymons have long endured sub-standard education and are hoping that busing will finally change this. Colin Diver, a Harvard Law School graduate and assistant to Mayor Kevin White, and his wife Joan Diver, director of The Hyams Foundation, move into the gentrifying South End, a block from one of the Twymon sisters, who lives with her children in the shoddily constructed Methunion Manor housing project. The Divers are in favor of busing, but the effects hit home when they learn that it may result in their own son being bused to a foreign neighborhood. After six years of combating racial and class tension and street violence, the Divers leave the city for suburban Newton.

== Reception ==
Robert Dentler, a sociologist who helped Judge Garrity draft the busing plan, criticized Common Ground for "distorted, questionable legends" and a "docudramatic method of reporting" that "cloak[ed] the ignorance, fear, and hostility of the minority of citizens in the white enclaves of Boston who initiated racial violence in the robe of civic innocence."

However, in a retrospective appreciation, LynNell Hancock of the Columbia Journalism Review wrote, "Anthony Lukas was a perfectionist in a world that is far from perfect. Common Ground is probably as close to that ideal as journalism can get."

== Contents by chapter ==
1. Diver - Colin Diver, living in Cambridge, responds to the assassination of Martin Luther King Jr.
2. Twymon - Rachel Twymon and her family, living in Orchard Park, respond to King's assassination; King's and Louis Farrakhan's ties to Boston
3. McGoff - Alice McGoff, living in Charlestown, responds to King's assassination; the political rise of John F. Kennedy and Ted Kennedy
4. Diver - Boston Mayor Kevin White and the city's elite respond to King's assassination; James Brown's concert in Boston calming racial tensions; Diver decides to work for White
5. Twymon - Genealogical history of Rachel Twymon; history of slavery and abolitionism in Boston
6. McGoff - Genealogical history of Alice McGoff; Irish immigration to Boston; history of Charlestown
7. Diver - Genealogical history of Joan McKechnie and Colin Diver; James A. Parker's 1963 housing discrimination lawsuit in Lexington
8. Twymon - Jonathan Kozol is fired from the Christopher Gibson School in Dorchester, where five of Rachel's children attend; the Coleman Report; Rachel's children attend parochial school, an East Boston junior high school, Boston English
9. The Chairwoman - Boston School Committee Chairwoman Louise Day Hicks opposes school desegregation, establishes Restore Our Alienated Rights (ROAR)
10. McGoff - Alice Kirk (McGoff)'s family; the rise of William J. Galvin to City Council president; racial conflict in Charlestown
11. Diver - the Divers move to West Newton Street in the South End; gentrification in the neighborhood
12. Twymon - Rachel Twymon battles lupus to run a failing shop in Roxbury; history of Union United Methodist Church in the South End; construction of Methunion Manor
13. Diver - Colin handles urban renewal battles, including Logan Airport expansion; White's failed gubernatorial bid; redlining in Boston; passage and failed repeal of the Racial Imbalance Act
14. The Judge - W. Arthur Garrity Jr. and his busing plan
15. McGoff - Ted Kennedy is pelted at City Hall by anti-busing protesters; Alice McGoff becomes an anti-busing activist in ROAR
16. Twymon - Rachel Twymon's daughters Cassandra and Rachel are bused to Charlestown schools; anti-busing protests at Charlestown High School
17. McGoff - Alice McGoff's children at Charlestown High participate in anti-busing protest; they witness The Soiling of Old Glory incident
18. Diver - busing plan threatens the experimental Bancroft School in the South End; Boston philanthropy; Joan rises to become director of the Hyams Foundation; anti-busing activists protest the United Way of Massachusetts
19. McGoff - the McGoffs, the Catholic Church, and the busing crisis
20. The Cardinal - Cardinal Humberto Sousa Medeiros; Cardinal William Henry O'Connell; Cardinal Richard Cushing
21. Twymon - fiscal problems of Union United Methodist and Methunion Manor; Rachel Twymon's disciplinary problems with her children; street crime
22. Diver - gentrification conflicts in the South End; street crime directly affects the Divers
23. McGoff - riot police enforce busing in Charlestown; Tip O'Neill opposes anti-busing amendment; anti-busing protesters dwindle as splits emerge on class lines
24. The Editor - Boston Globe Editor Tom Winship; the Globe responds to civil rights movement, changing demographics, busing crisis
25. Twymon - Rachel Twymon's sister Alva Walker Debnam buys a home in Dorchester; family undergoes a racist siege of violence and intimidation; United States Bicentennial; race riot that day centered around Debnams leads to Tommy Walker seriously injuring three rioters WALKER, COMMONWEALTH vs., 379 Mass. 297
26. McGoff - Lisa McGoff, Alice's daughter, becomes Charlestown High's senior class president
27. Twymon - Rachel's son Freddie is convicted of rape; conflict between Rachel and her family; successes in the Twymon household
28. The Mayor - Kevin White almost becomes George McGovern's vice presidential candidate; White's rise to power; détente with Hicks; conflict with Garrity; "retreat from the tough issues"
29. Diver - ongoing street violence and ineffective response; decline of the Bancroft; Divers move to Newton

Epilogue

== Other characters ==
Other notable Boston figures who play roles in the book include Barney Frank as an aide to Mayor Kevin White, young reporter Mike Barnicle, White foil Ted Kennedy, and community organizer Mel King.

== Legacy ==
It would be revealed in April, 2021, that the son that Rachel Twymon (daughter) put up for adoption was former Boston City Councilor and former Mayoral Candidate Tito Jackson (politician), who reconnected with her decades later.
