= UMass Boston College of Education and Human Development =

College of Education at UMass Boston

University of Massachusetts Boston College of Education and Human Development
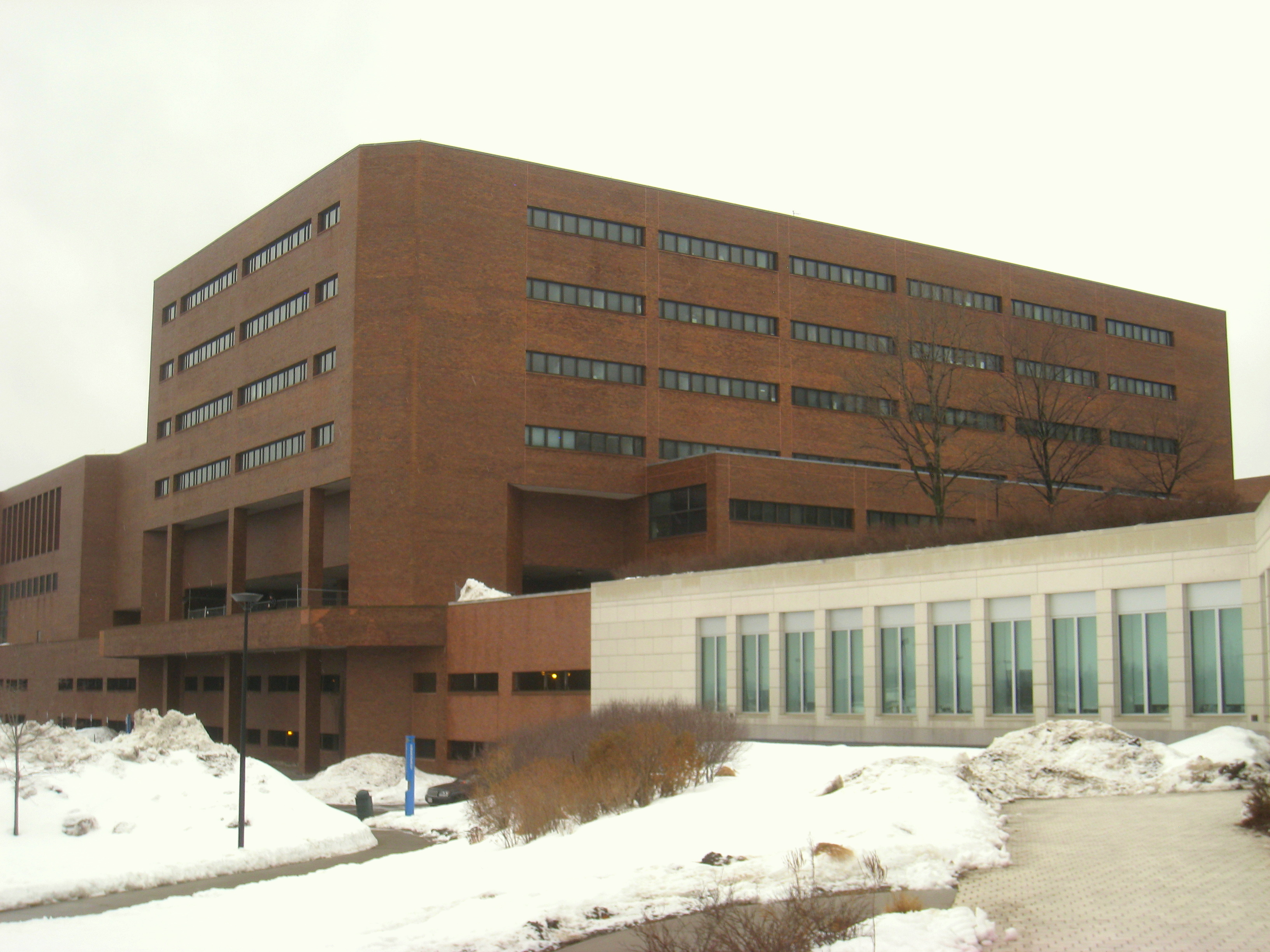
- Phillis Wheatley Peters Hall, which houses the College of Education and Human Development
- Type: Public
- Established: 1852/1982
- Dean: Dr. Tara Parker
- Faculty: 89
- Students: 958 (graduate); 500 (undergraduate)
- Location: Boston, Massachusetts, United States
- Campus: Urban
- Website: www.umb.edu/education

The UMass Boston College of Education and Human Development is an American college of education within the University of Massachusetts Boston. It consists of three academic departments and a school. It is currently ranked 45th in the nation by U.S. News & World Report and is the top ranked public school of education in Massachusetts.

== History ==
The College of Education and Human Development (CEHD) has its historical roots in the former Boston State College. Originally started as a teacher preparation program for young women at the Girls' High School in 1852, it became the Boston Normal School in 1872 and remained a part of that institution for over 100 years. In 1982, it was merged into the University of Massachusetts Boston and became the College of Education. It would be renamed the Graduate College of Education in the 1990s (when its undergraduate programs were closed) and again renamed the College of Education and Human Development in 2008 (when some undergraduate programs were re-opened).

Today, it has three academic departments, Department of Counseling, School Psychology, and Sport (CSPS), Department of Curriculum and Instruction (C&I), Department of Leadership in Education (LE), and the School for Global Inclusion and Social Development (SGISD) (which opened in 2014 and was first of its kind in the world).

CEHD is the largest provider of teachers to the Boston Public Schools and the most racially diverse teacher preparation program in Massachusetts. In the 1990s, the College of Education began a partnership with The Mather School and Dorchester High School. In the late 1990s, the Teach Next Year program, a nationally recognized yearlong teacher residency, was created as a pipeline program with the Boston Public Schools. It was highlighted by Barack Obama during his 2011 speech at TechBoston Academy in Dorchester. In 2024, CEHD entered a partnership with the Ruth Batson Academy (formerly the BCLA/McCormack School) in Dorchester to create Boston's first University-Assisted Community School and received a $1.9 million donation from Robert and Ruth Starratt to create a scholarship for students from the Ruth Batson Academy who plan to pursue a career in education in the Boston Public Schools.

Since 2018, the New Balance corporation has donated $15 million to help establish an undergraduate sports leadership and administration program in CEHD.

== Programs of study ==
CEHD offers Bachelor of Arts (B.A.) degrees in Early Education and Care in Inclusive Settings, Sport Leadership and Administration, and an Education Studies Minor; Master's of Education (M.Ed.) degrees in Counseling, Educational Leadership for Social Justice, Early Childhood, Elementary Education, Instructional Design, Middle/Secondary Education, School Psychology, Special Education, Teaching Learning and Educational Transformation; Master's of Arts (M.A.) in Critical and Creative Thinking; Master's of Science (M.S.) in Mental Health Counseling; Educational Specialist (Ed.S.) degrees in School Psychology; Certificate of Advanced Graduate Study (C.A.G.S.) in Counseling; Doctor of Education (Ed.D.) degrees in Higher Education, and Urban Education Leadership and Policy Studies; Doctor of Philosophy (Ph.D.) degrees in Counseling and School Psychology, Early Childhood Education and Care, Higher Education, and Urban Education Leadership and Policy Studies. CEHD has approximately 90 full-time faculty members, 500 undergraduate students, and 1,000 graduate students.

== Research and outreach ==
CEHD is home to the Institute for Community Inclusion, one of the first of its kind in the country, which was established in 1967 to support people with disabilities related to training, research, consultation, community outreach, and employment services. It also houses the Institute for New England Native American Studies, Educational Leadership & Transformation Institute for Racial Justice, Center of Science & Mathematics in Context, Early Education Leaders Institute, and the Institute for International & Comparative Education.

== Notable people ==
- Annissa Essaibi George, former Boston City Councilor, alumna
- Richard Curwin, expert in classroom management, alumnus (Boston State College)
- Mike Gorman, sports commentator, alumnus (Boston State College)
- Mel King, politician, community organizer, and educator, alumnus (Boston State College)
- Ron Mariano, Speaker of the Massachusetts House of Representatives, alumnus
- Jean McGuire, educator and civil rights leader, alumna (Boston State College)
- Peter Petrigno, politician, educator, and community, alumnus (Boston State College)
- Yvonne M. Spicer, former mayor of Framingham and first Black woman mayor of a Massachusetts city, alumna
- John Tsang, former Financial Secretary of Hong Kong, alumnus (Boston State College)
- Gladys Wood, first African American principal in the Boston Public Schools, alumna (Boston State College)
