= Robert Dentler =

American sociologist

- Born: November 26, 1928; Oak Park, Illinois, U.S.
- Died: March 20, 2008 (aged 79); Cambridge, Massachusetts
- Education: Northwestern University; American University; University of Chicago
- Known for: Boston desegregation plan
- Awards: Distinguished Career Award, American Sociological Association
- Scientific career
- Fields: Sociology
- Workplaces: University of Chicago, University of Kansas, Dickinson College, Dartmouth College, Teachers College of Columbia University, Boston University, University of Massachusetts, Boston.
- Doctoral advisor: Elihu Katz

Robert A. Dentler (November 26, 1928 – March 20, 2008) was an American sociologist who co-authored and oversaw the controversial court-ordered busing plan to desegregate Boston's public schools in the 1970s through the 1980s. He was involved in the school desegregation plans for at least sixteen other northern American cities and the University of North Carolina system.

== Education and career ==
In 1949, he received a bachelor's in political science from Northwestern University. Dentler began his career in 1949 as a crime reporter for the Chicago City News Bureau. In 1950, he earned a master's in English literature from Northwestern, then taught at the Pomfret School as an English teacher from 1950 to 1952. He then served as an intelligence officer for the U.S. government from 1952 to 1954.

In 1954, he received a master's in sociology from American University. His master's thesis was the first in-depth study of the Federal Writers' Project, the New Deal program to support writers during the Great Depression. Dentler then obtained a Ph.D. in sociology from the University of Chicago in 1960. Dentler taught at the U.S. Army War College and Dickinson College from 1955 to 1957. While a Ph.D. candidate, Dentler taught at the University of Chicago. He then taught at the University of Kansas (1959–1961), and Dartmouth College (1961–1962), and spent the following ten years at Teachers College, Columbia University. In 1972 he became Dean of Education and University Professor of Education and Sociology at Boston University. He became a tenured professor of education and sociology at the University of Massachusetts, Boston in 1983. He retired his faculty position 1992 and continued to teach part-time there until his death.

== National desegregation efforts ==
Dentler worked as a director of the Institute for Urban Studies, established in 1963 by faculty at Columbia University Teachers College. In that capacity, Dentler was hired by the New York State Education Commission as a researcher and staff writer. He and colleagues Richard Boardman and Bernard Mackler co-authored Desegregating the New York City Public Schools (1964), commonly known as the Allen Report. The Allen Report was intended to provide the data and research to support the desegregation of the New York City public school system, then the nation's largest school district with more than 1,000 schools and over a million students.

Dentler later advised on desegregation plans for New York City, Buffalo, Rochester and White Plains, New York; Bridgeport and Stamford, Connecticut; Harrisburg, Pennsylvania; Los Angeles and San Bernardino, California. From 1973 to 1985, Dentler was involved in drafting and implementing Boston's controversial desegregation plan. In 1979, he worked on desegregating the University of North Carolina system. In the 1980s, he advised desegregation efforts in the southern school districts of St. Louis and Kansas City, Missouri; Little Rock; Mobile, Alabama; and DeKalb County, Georgia. In 1994, he served as the leading expert witness in the federal court case that led to the desegregation of schools in Rockford, Illinois.

== Boston school desegregation ==
In 1973, Dentler was appointed to the Boston Mayor's Commission on the Public School, as U.S. District Judge W. Arthur Garrity Jr. considered whether the Boston Public Schools were in violation of the Massachusetts Racial Imbalance Act. In 1975, Garrity selected Dentler and Boston University's associate dean, Marvin B. Scott, to draft the Boston school desegregation plan, which involved the busing of thousands of students to break up the high level of segregation in the Boston school system. The plan transformed the Boston schools over a decade marked by incidents of racial conflict and violence, often directed by working-class whites against black students.

Dentler was critical of Common Ground, J. Anthony Lucas's Pulitzer-Prize-winning book about the Boston busing crisis, saying "social and political demography as well as intergroup history get short shrift," saying the author wove a "complete fabric of exculpation out of the stuff of ... local legends." Dentler believed the book was somewhat unfair and inaccurate in its depiction of Judge Garrity, with whom Dentler had a close and enduring professional and personal relationship.

== Conflict with John Silber ==
Dentler was one of fifteen academic deans who led a revolt against Boston University President John Silber, who survived multiple "no-confidence" votes by trustees and faculty in the 1970s and 1980s. Silber's firing of the deans was the subject of a cover article for Esquire Magazine in 1977 by Nora Ephron.

== Praise ==
"He had a deep and abiding desire for achieving justice. He would have nothing to do with a plan that wasn't designed to achieve justice. Justice as he saw it was justice for people of color as well as for white people. It was justice for people of limited income as well as for affluent people. That was something that stayed with him." — Charles Willie, one of the court-appointed special masters for Judge Garrity's desegregation plan.

== Personal life ==
Dentler was the son of Arnold and Jennie Munsen Dentler of Oak Park, Illinois. His wife, Helen Hosmer Dentler, whom he married in 1950, was an artist who designed a number of book jackets for Dentler's publications and in her fifties returned to school to become a paralegal. She retired after ten years with the Boston law firm Hale & Dorr. They had one daughter, Deborah Dentler, and two sons, Eric Arnold Dentler and Robin Howard Dentler. His brother, Rev. Howard Dentler (1922–2013), a board member of the Heifer Foundation, was a pastor active in the liberal Christian denomination, Disciples of Christ, who began his ministerial career serving an African-American congregation in the 1950s.

Dentler served as president of the congregation of First Parish Unitarian-Universalist Church of Lexington, Massachusetts. His principal avocation was poetry. In the final year of his life, he became the oldest student to enroll in the poetry-writing seminar taught by acclaimed Massachusetts poet Tom Daley, who eulogized Dentler at a memorial service held at First Parish Church in April 2008.

Dentler died of geriatric myelodysplasia. Personal and professional biographical information about Dentler has been collected by independent scholar Thomas Quirk.

== Bibliography ==
Among Dentler's 16 books:

- Big City Dropouts and Illiterates (1967)
- Schools on Trial: An Inside Account of the Boston Desegregation Case (1981)
- University on Trial: The Case of the University of North Carolina (1983)
- Practicing Sociology (2002)
- Hostage America (Beacon Press 1963) (reportedly Dentler's favorite, Hostage America analyzed the human and sociological consequences of a nuclear attack)

== Awards and honors ==
Dentler earned several awards in his career:

- William Lloyd Garrison Award, Massachusetts Educational Opportunity Association, 1992
- Distinguished Career Award, Sociological Practice, American Sociological Association, 1993
- Distinguished Career Award, American Sociological Association, 2007

The American Sociological Association confers an annual Award for Outstanding Student Achievement in his honor. In 2008, Northwestern University established the Robert Dentler Memorial Prize in poetry, an annual creative writing competition.
