= METCO =

Voluntary desegregation program in Boston

Metropolitan Council for Educational Opportunity
- Abbreviation: METCO (Note: The program is sometimes referred to in print as Metco rather than METCO.)
- Formation: 1966; 60 years ago
- Founders: Ruth Batson; Betty Johnson; Leon Trilling
- Type: School desegregation program
- Legal status: Headquarters: 501(c)(3) organization Program: public educational initiative
- Headquarters: 11 Roxbury Street
- Location: Boston, Massachusetts, U.S.
- President and CEO: Kandice Sumner
- Board chairperson: Nia Grace
- Website: metcoinc.org

The Metropolitan Council for Educational Opportunity, Inc. (METCO, Inc.), based primarily in the metropolitan Boston, Massachusetts area, is the largest and second-longest continuously running voluntary school desegregation program in the United States. (Note: The longest continuously running voluntary school desegregation program in the United States is the Urban-Suburban Interdistrict Transfer Program in the area around Rochester, New York, established in 1965 through the efforts of Alice Holloway Young.) Begun in 1966, it is a national model for the few other voluntary desegregation busing programs operating in the early decades of the 21st century. The program enrolls Boston resident students in kindergarten through 12th grade into available seats in suburban public schools.

Conceived by Boston activists Ruth Batson and Betty Johnson, and Brookline School Committee Chair Dr. Leon Trilling, METCO launched in 1966 as a coalition of seven school districts, placing 220 students. The Massachusetts Racial Imbalance Act (RIA) of 1966, amended in 1974, is the legal basis for voluntary interdistrict transfers for the purpose of desegregation (such as METCO). Funding is almost entirely provided by the Commonwealth of Massachusetts. Over the years, the academic and social outcomes of the program have been praised, while the increasing gap between cost and funding, and the negative experiences reported by students of color have been the subject of criticism.

== Purpose ==
As defined by the original METCO Grant, the purpose of the program is "to expand educational opportunities, increase diversity, and reduce racial isolation by permitting students in Boston and Springfield to attend public schools in other communities that have agreed to participate. The program provides students of participating school districts the opportunity to experience the advantages of learning and working in a racially, ethnically, and linguistically diverse setting." The mission of METCO is two-fold: to give students from Boston's under-performing school districts the opportunity to attend a high-performing school and increase their educational opportunities, and to decrease racial isolation and increase diversity in suburban schools.

== Structure and operations ==
Each suburban district operates its METCO program independently, at the discretion of each city or town's school committee. The METCO program is funded predominantly by a state line item allocated by the Massachusetts Legislature every year and distributed to each participating district by a formula related to the number of students enrolled. The Massachusetts Department of Elementary and Secondary Education (DESE) administers the grant and related reporting. The city of Boston does not contribute any money to METCO operations.

The majority of the funding goes to transportation, which is organized by each suburban school district. Other major budget items are salaries of dedicated METCO personnel in each district, and the central administration at METCO, Inc. METCO, Inc. is the Boston-based 501(c)(3) organization that oversees the recruitment, eligibility screening, and school assignment of Boston students. It also provides support services in Boston to METCO families.

Districts determine the number of “marginal seats” available in each grade, and request a corresponding number of student applicants from the METCO, Inc. central office. The METCO application policy was revised in 2019 to clarify eligibility for the program and the process by which students are referred from Boston to a participating school district, as well as the basis by which a district places students in open seats.

METCO directors from each district formed an independent non-profit membership organization, the METCO Directors Association, for mutual support and professional development. Some communities have active resident groups to provide funding and social support to Boston students.

== History ==
METCO was developed during a period of activism by Black parents, primarily mothers, in Boston to achieve educational equity through school desegregation. In 1963, the Boston branch of the NAACP demanded that the School Committee of Boston Public Schools acknowledge de facto segregation and commit to a series of reforms. The demands were presented by the chair of the Education Committee of the NAACP, activist Ruth Batson. A series of protests gained publicity; they included sit-ins, boycotts, and a self-funded desegregation program within the city called Operation Exodus. However, the Boston Public Schools continued to either deny that racial disparities existed, or to deny responsibility for them.

The state of Massachusetts, on the other hand, did provide legal support for the protestors. The Racial Imbalance Bill was filed by State Representative Royal L. Bolling and passed in 1965 as Massachusetts General Law Chapter 76, Section 12A, becoming the Massachusetts Racial Imbalance Act (RIA). This law authorized the withholding of funds from any public school deemed to be perpetuating “racial imbalance,” which was defined as having more than 50% non-white students. The law also enabled city and town school committees and districts to "help alleviate racial isolation" (defined as any public school where more than 70% of the student population is white) through voluntary cross-district enrollment.

In response to Civil Rights protests in the Southern United States, groups in the Boston suburbs (such as fair housing advocates, civil rights committees, the League of Women Voters, churches, and members of School Committees) began to conceive of programs to enroll Black students allowed under the Racial Imbalance Act. A group led by MIT Professor Dr. Leon Trilling (Chair of Brookline's School Committee) presented what they called the METCO initiative to Ruth Batson, then the director of the Massachusetts Commission Against Discrimination. She agreed to support the program as associate director alongside Joseph Killory, who took a leave from the Massachusetts Department of Education to serve as executive director.

METCO filed for non-profit status in 1966 with Trilling as the chair of the board of directors. Among those also serving on the original Board of Directors were Paul Parks from the NAACP, arts educator Elma Lewis, Boston teacher John D. O'Bryant, Brookline School Superintendent Robert Sperber, Newton Superintendent Charles Brown, and Newton School Committee member Katherine Jones. The group received grants from the Carnegie Corporation and the U.S. Department of Education, and engaged a research group from Harvard to evaluate the program's initial effectiveness.

The first 220 METCO students, individually recruited and interviewed by Batson, rode buses from Roxbury, North Dorchester, and the South End to their first day of school in seven participating school districts in Greater Boston: Arlington, Braintree, Brookline, Lexington, Lincoln, Newton, and Wellesley.

Batson became the executive director of the program in 1968, and the Massachusetts State Legislature began funding the program through a yearly line item. Additional school districts applied to participate in METCO in the late 1960s, with the full cohort of 33 current districts signing on by 1972. Robert C. Hayden served as executive director from 1969 to 1973.

Boston Public Schools teacher and community activist Jean McGuire became the executive director of METCO Inc. in 1973. She held this position for more than four decades, spanning the period of court-mandated desegregation in Boston and multiple waves of funding pressure and local opposition. In response to an order by the Massachusetts Department of Education in the mid-1990s, McGuire began actively recruiting Latino and Asian students to more accurately reflect the changing demographics in Boston .

In 2018, Milly Arbaje-Thomas assumed leadership of METCO, Inc. The organization has reformed the application process for families, changing from a waiting list reported to be 12,000 students long to an online lottery system.

As of 2015 there are approximately 3,300 students enrolled in the program, the majority of whom come from the city of Boston (about 150 come from the city of Springfield). As of 2001, approximately 4,300 students have graduated from the program since its founding. In the 2010–2011 school year, 75.2% of METCO pupils were African American, 3.4% were Asian, 16.8% were Hispanic, and the remaining 5% were classified as multi-race or "other." The demographics of Boston's school district in 2003 were 35% African-American, 41% Hispanic, 13% White and 8% Asian. As of 2010–2011, 33 of the 37 receiving districts remained "racially isolated" (over 70% white) while 4 receiving districts are "racially balanced" (50–70% white).

== Research and impact ==
There is evidence that METCO boosts academic success for Boston resident students. Students in the METCO program consistently graduate from high school at the same rate as their suburban classmates (nearly 100%), compared to around 65% of Boston Public Schools students. Around 88% of METCO students enroll in post-secondary education, equaling the graduation rates of receiving districts, above the state average of 81%, and far above the Boston average of 58%.

Grades and standardized test score data are more mixed. During most of its history, METCO did not use a lottery, and the demographic profile of METCO students does not match the profile of minorities in Boston. Without a randomized admission process (including tracking outcomes for those not selected), selection bias effects may account for most outcome differences with the Boston school population.

It has been reported both qualitatively and quantitatively that most families enrolled in METCO districts weigh the opportunity for an excellent education as far more important than decreasing racial isolation, although they acknowledge that as an important side factor.

== Challenges and controversies ==
=== Funding ===
When METCO was initiated in 1966, receiving districts received a state grant covering transportation costs for students, and a tuition assessment set by receiving districts. Over time, the financial system evolved from one where receiving districts set tuition rates, to a "grant" system where a standard per-pupil grant of $3,925 (FY2017) is provided to receiving districts, almost all of which is used to fund METCO direct services with no money available for indirect general educational expenses. The Boston School Committee does not pay METCO financial expenses, having passed a resolution supporting METCO upon the condition that Boston not contribute financially. The consequence is that receiving districts must make up the gap in costs.

=== Student experience ===
Alumni of the program have frequently written and spoken about the adverse effects of long bus rides; being considered "other" compared to the white, resident students; racial microaggressions, slurs, and assaults; and lack of teachers of color to serve as role models.

== Notable alumni ==
Notable alumni of the METCO program include:

- Michael Bivins, singer
- Bruce Brown, professional basketball player
- Audie Cornish, journalist
- Tito Jackson, politician
- Kim Janey, politician
- Marilyn Mosby, politician
- Danzy Senna, author
- Brian Worrell, politician
- Christopher Worrell, politician

The president of METCO since September 2025, Kandice Sumner, is also a program alumnus.

== Participating municipalities ==
Boston and Springfield are the two districts that send students to receiving communities.

=== Receiving districts – Boston students ===
A subset of school districts in the Boston area participate in METCO, typically those districts that are more affluent (and can subsidize the program).

- Arlington
- Bedford
- Belmont
- Braintree
- Brookline
- Cohasset
- Concord
- Concord-Carlisle
- Dover
- Dover-Sherborn
- Foxborough
- Hingham
- Lexington
- Lincoln
- Lincoln-Sudbury
- Lynnfield
- Marblehead
- Melrose
- Natick
- Needham
- Newton
- Reading
- Scituate
- Sharon
- Sherborn
- Sudbury
- Swampscott
- Wakefield
- Walpole
- Wayland
- Wellesley
- Weston
- Westwood

=== Receiving districts – Springfield students ===
- East Longmeadow
- Longmeadow
- Hampden-Wilbraham
- Southwick-Tolland

=== Withdrawn communities ===
These communities previously received Boston students.

- Framingham
- Milton
- Rockland

== See also ==
- Education in Massachusetts
- Boston desegregation busing crisis
