= Christopher Lukas =

American actor

- Born: March 6, 1935 (age 91); New York City, New York, U.S.
- Occupations: Television producer, non-fiction writer, stage actor, director
- Spouse: Susan Ries (1962–2008; her death)
- Writing career
- Genre: Psychology non-fiction

Christopher Lukas (born March 6, 1935) is an American writer, stage actor, television producer and director who, for the past fifty-five years, has worked primarily for public television. From 1963 to 1971 he produced for WNET in New York City, making over 200 hours of programming for the educational station. A program of a Shakespeare rehearsal was praised by then-NY Times critic Jack Gould. In 1969 he was promoted to director of programming.

== His birth, early years, and education ==
Christopher "Kit" Lukas was born to Elizabeth and Edwin Lukas in New York. His mother was an actress, and his uncle Paul Lukas was an Academy Award–winning actor. His father was a lawyer who headed up the civil rights division of the American Jewish Committee, and made many efforts to promote equality between the races in America. After his mother's death by suicide and his father's illness after her death, he was at the age of six enrolled in the coeducational Putney School boarding school in Vermont. He graduated with high honors from Swarthmore College and married Susan Ries—author and psychotherapist—in 1962. She died in 2008. His older brother was J. Anthony Lukas, Pulitzer Prize-winning journalist and writer. Christopher and Susan's two daughters—Megan and Gabriela—have three children between them.

== Career ==
=== Television ===
For fifty years, Lukas worked primarily for public television. From 1963 to 1971 he produced for WNET in New York City, making over 200 hours of programming for the educational station. A program of a Shakespeare rehearsal was praised by then-NY Times critic Jack Gould. In 1969 he was promoted to director of programming. The New York Times (nytimes.com) In 1968 Lukas proposed and received funding for the series SOUL![4], the first black-produced program for African-Americans on public TV—which ran for five years.

Controversy ensued from many of Lukas's projects. DOCUMENTARIES AND BALANCE - The New York Times (nytimes.com

After his work with WNET Lukas moved into the freelance world in 1971, working for public TV stations in San Francisco and Chicago, among others. His works for PBS include: The Mystery of Love, The World of Abnormal Psychology, Music From Aspen, Whose Death is It, Anyway?, Moyers: Report from Philadelphia, The Do It Yourself Messiah, Pete Seeger's Legacy aired in over 150 cities in 2019. In 1979, a program about Pompeii received Emmys in four categories in Chicago.

=== Teaching ===
Between 1980 and 1987, Lukas taught at the City University of New York, eventually being appointed chairman of the newly formed Communications, Film, and Television Department.

=== Acting ===
While continuing to work in video and television, Lukas returned in 2002 to the field of acting. He has appeared off-Broadway and in regional theaters, playing a wide variety of roles in plays by Shakespeare, Dostoyevsky, Chekhov, and Stoppard.

=== Writing ===
His works include:

- Blue Genes: A Memoir of Loss & Survival (ISBN 978-0-385-52520-6). Blue Genes: A Memoir of Loss and Survival (publishersweekly.com) (Doubleday) 2008
- Silent Grief: Living in the Wake of Suicide (Scribners, Bantam Books) 1987 (ISBN 978-1-84310-847-4). Also published in Brazil, Russia, and China.
- Staying in Charge: Practical Plans for the End of Your Life (John Wiley & Son) 2004 (ISBN 978-0-471-27424-7).
- The First Year: Prostate Cancer (Marlowe Books.) 2005 (ISBN 978-1-56924-352-7).)
- Shrink Rap: a guide to psychotherapy by a frequent flier
