= Morgan v. Hennigan =

1972 American court case

Morgan v. Hennigan was the case that defined the school busing controversy in Boston, Massachusetts during the 1970s. On March 14, 1972, the Boston chapter of the NAACP filed a class action lawsuit against the Boston School Committee on behalf of 14 black parents and 44 children. Tallulah Morgan headed the list of plaintiffs, and James Hennigan, then chair of the School Committee, was listed as the main defendant.

The plaintiffs' legal team decided to pursue the case as a violation of the U.S. Constitution. The School Committee was charged with violating the Thirteenth and Fourteenth Amendments as well as the 1964 Civil Rights Act. The plaintiffs claimed that the defendants, the School Committee, the Board of Education, and the Education Commissioner, "ha[d] intentionally brought about and maintained racial segregation in the Boston Public Schools."

In short, while Boston was not experiencing "de jure" segregation (segregation as a result of the law), it was experiencing "de facto" segregation (segregation as a result of action). Judge W. Arthur Garrity Jr. was randomly assigned to the case. He did not make a decision until June 21, 1974.

At that point he ruled that the city defendants had contributed to the "establishment of a dual school system," one for each race. Garrity's solution to the problem of segregation in Boston would become an explosive issue in the city. The main tactics for reducing segregation were redistricting and busing.

== Background ==
Following World War II a major civil rights movement swept the United States. The 1950s and 1960s were marked by sit-ins, protests, marches and boycotts. By the 1960s this movement was brought to national attention as television created almost ubiquitous media coverage. The impact of the civil rights movement on Boston was magnified as the city's population of African Americans increased from approximately 42,659 in 1950 to approximately 104,429 in 1970.

In 1954, the Supreme Court of the United States decided a case which would advance the civil rights movement and become a major precedent for the case in Boston. In Brown v. Topeka Board of Education, the Supreme Court found that public school segregation "denie[d] to Negro children the equal protection of the laws guaranteed by the Fourteenth Amendment."

The judges relied on sociological evidence which showed that separate educational facilities were detrimental to the development of black children. When the decision was implemented in Little Rock, Arkansas, the white backlash shocked the nation and the world. While the Brown case put an end to "de jure" segregation, "de facto" segregation would become the focus of activists and legislators in Boston.

In 1961, the Education Committee of the NAACP, led by Ruth Batson, began a series of meetings with Boston's School Committee in order to make the members admit that de facto segregation existed in Boston's schools. Batson's argument rested on facts: thirteen schools in Boston were at least ninety percent black and the budgets provided for these schools were $125 per pupil less than the average budget for a white school in Boston. The School Committee refused to concede this point. As a result, the NAACP fought back with the traditional methods of the civil rights movement: boycotts and protests. Almost as soon as this movement began a counter-revolution rose up against the desegregation of Boston's Schools.

Even as the School Committee denied any segregation in Boston they supported policies that increased racial imbalance in public schools. Rather than send white students to majority black schools, the Committee constructed portable classrooms at already overcrowded white schools. At South Boston High, an all-white school, enrollment was over the limit by 676 students during the 1971-72 school year. Girls High, 92% black, was underenrolled by 532 places. Boston's system of feeder schools was probably the most efficient method of segregation utilized by the Committee. Under this system graduates from middle schools (ending with grade 8) went to high schools with grades 9-12.

Graduates from junior high schools (ending with grade 9) went to high schools with grades 10-12. Junior highs tended to be in white neighborhoods while middle schools tended to be in black neighborhoods. The School Committee incriminated itself by converting two of the largest black junior highs in the city into middle schools for no practical reason. After a decade of protests and arguments and evasions by the Boston School Committee the issue finally came to a head with the 1972 court case.

== Legal precedents ==
One of the reasons Judge Garrity took so long to deliver his decision in this case was because he wanted to make sure that what he decided was backed up by legal precedent. An important legal precedent for the Boston case was the U.S. Supreme Court case, Keyes v. School District No. 1, Denver. In this case black and Hispanic parents from Denver, Colorado filed suit against all Denver schools due to racial segregation. The 1973 decision on this case, written by Justice William J. Brennan, was key in defining de facto segregation. Brennan found that although there were no official laws supporting segregation in Denver, "the Board, through its actions over a period of years, intentionally created and maintained the segregated character of the core city schools." The issue of "intent" would become a key factor in the Boston case.

Another important precedent was the Swann v. Charlotte-Mecklenburg Board of Education case. In 1969, the Charlotte-Mecklenburg district in North Carolina was segregated by law. It was no surprise that a district court case regarding this issue found in favor of the black plaintiffs, but the important part of this case was the remedy ordered by Federal District Judge James McMillan. McMillan ordered extensive busing and regrouping of schools. In an appeal, the judge's orders were found to "exceed...his authority."

However, the case went to the U.S. Supreme Court, and Chief Justice Warren Burger argued that the equal protection guaranteed by the Fourteenth Amendment gave federal judges a wide berth of authority in implementing desegregation. Burger supported the call for busing. This precedent would give Garrity power of implementation in Boston.

== Decision and implementation ==
Judge Garrity forbade the School Committee from violating the Racial Imbalance Act in any way, beginning construction of any new school or portable class room or transferring white or black teachers in order to increase racial imbalance. Garrity's plan for implementation of his orders was extreme thanks to the authority granted by the Swann case.

Garrity explained that "neutral conduct [was] no longer constitutionally sufficient"; the School Committee would have to actively work to reverse the segregation of Boston schools. Until the Committee had come up with its own plan, Garrity decided to enforce a State Board of Education plan, formulated following the passage of the Racial Imbalance Act.

=== The Plan ===
The plan was scheduled to take effect on the first day of school in September 1974. It would reduce the number of majority black schools from sixty-eight to forty-four as well as reduce the number of black students attending imbalanced schools from approximately 30,000 to 10,000. The Board's plan was based on two basic methods: redistricting and busing. The plan would also replace the feeder system of junior and middle schools with a single middle school program.

=== Reaction ===
In a city heavily stratified into ethnic enclaves, the exchange of school children between communities was dangerous. Ms. Gloria Joyner, a black mother of two high school students, rode the school bus from Roxbury to South Boston at the start of the 1974 school year. She described the escort required to keep the buses and children safe from white mobs: "our four buses were escorted by three police cruisers, 10 motorcycles, and a state helicopter overhead looking for rooftop snipers." Buses were met with hurled stones and racial slurs.

On November 20, South Boston High School erupted in fights between students. The chaos delayed the start of the school day. The catalyst had been a white male student letting a door slam in the face of a black female student. One teacher, Ione Malloy, explained the atmosphere of the school at this point, "This school is DEATH. The mood of the school is black."

Fights were frequent. The climax of violence in South Boston came on December 11, when a white student, Michael Faith, was stabbed. News of the stabbing spread through the community and by one o'clock 1,500 people surrounded the school waiting for the black students to leave. Bricks and bottles were hurled at police officers. Finally, three decoy buses came out and the mob went after them. The black students left via the back of the building and escaped.

=== Master Plan ===
When the Boston School Committee repeatedly failed to submit an acceptable plan for desegregation, Garrity created a committee to formulate a “Master’s Plan.” This plan was submitted in May 1975 and would become Phase II. The plan created a citywide magnet school district open to all students regardless of residence. It also included the partnering of public schools to twenty community colleges and universities to improve the quality of education in the former. The plan would call for the busing of 24,000 students. In addition to all this the plan also shifted focus to elementary and middle school aged students.

While the School Committee still claimed not to accept any plan for forced busing, this plan was met with less instances of violence than the first phase. In May 1977, Garrity released Phase III, meant to shift control of implementation back to the Boston school system. Despite the School Committee's enduring resistance to busing, the constituents of Boston came to the slow realization that the Committee members themselves were the "architects of inferior schools."

In the November 1977 school board elections, three vocal anti-busing School Committee members were defeated, while John D. O'Bryant became the first black man to be elected to the Committee in the 20th century. In 1982, Judge Garrity officially turned over monitoring of desegregation to the State Board of Education.

== Results ==
For more than a decade Boston's school system was degraded by violence, hatred, and a breakdown of education. The results of this struggle for equality were not lasting. As of late 1989 Boston's School Committee continued to circumvent racial balance regulations. At a meeting in December of that year the Committee discussed racial statistics. One member made a telling inquiry about the Committee's policy: "We are excluding the Latin Schools because the numbers of students are predominantly white, is that it?" Another member provided the official response, to wit, that Latin schools were not incorporated because their admissions were different.

In the 2003-04 school year the majority of black and Latino students in Boston attended schools that were, on average, approximately 10 percent white. In 2003, of all the Boston schools found to be struggling and in need of "corrective action", 90 percent were non-white. It was found that, since 1999, white students had attended schools that had become progressively whiter every year.

== See also ==
- List of class-action lawsuits
- Roberts v. City of Boston (1850)
