= Tito Jackson (politician) =

American politician

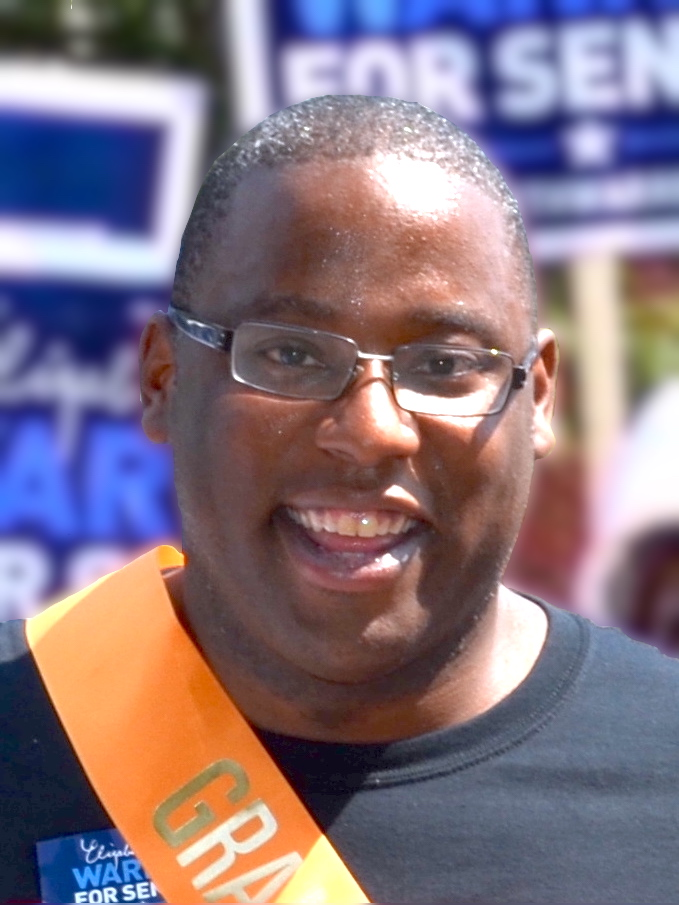
- Jackson in 2012

Member of the Boston City Council from District 7
- In office March 2011 – December 2017
- Preceded by: Chuck Turner
- Succeeded by: Kim Janey

Personal details
- Born: April 11, 1975 (age 51) South End, Boston, Massachusetts, U.S.
- Party: Democratic
- Education: University of New Hampshire (BA)
- Occupation: Politician

Tito Jackson (born April 11, 1975) is an American politician who was a member of the Boston City Council. He represented council District 7, representing parts of the Roxbury neighborhood and parts of Dorchester, South End, and Fenway. In 2017, he ran unsuccessfully for mayor of Boston against incumbent mayor Marty Walsh. After leaving the Boston City Council, Jackson worked in the cannabis industry. In 2022, Boston Mayor Michelle Wu appointed Jackson to the city's Commission on Black Men and Boys.

Jackson is considered to be a political progressive.

== Early life, family, and education ==
Jackson was born to a teenage mother who had been impregnated in a sexual assault. He was adopted by Rosa and Herb Jackson after months in foster care. Jackson is African American. His adoptive father was a community activist and his adoptive mother ran a home day care. In his activism, Jackson's father supported the election of political candidates of color through voter registration campaigns and applied pressure to construction companies in the city to employ more local workers and minorities. Jackson's father died in 2002. Jackson has credited his adoptive parents' progressive politics for shaping his own progressive politics.

Jackson grew up in the Grove Hall neighborhood of the city. As of 2017, he was living in the same Grove Hall home that he had grown up in. The home is located in the border-area of the larger neighborhood of Roxbury and Dorchester. (Note: While Grove Hall is considered a neighborhood by the City of Boston, it is not considered as one of the city's "main" neighborhoods. Dorchester and Roxbury are among the city's main neighborhoods (per the accounts of the city government and unofficial sources). Hence, why Jackson's residence in the Grove Hall neighborhood would also be considered to also be within either of the aforementioned "main" neighborhoods. Different government agencies and entities disagree as to whether Jackson's home is located in Roxbury or in Dorchester. As of 2017, the city's zoning and planning maps labeled the home as being in Roxbury, while its assessing department listed it as being in Dorchester. The United States Postal Service serves the Grove Hall neighborhood through its Dorchester post office, but had prior to 1967 served it through its Roxbury post office. The question of which neighborhood (Roxbury or Dorchester) Jackson lived in garnered minor attention during his 2017 mayoral campaign, as Roxbury is considered the city's most well-known African American community, while Dorchester is a more white neighborhood from which the incumbent mayor that Jackson was challenging had hailed. At the time, local leaders commented on how the boundary lines between the neighborhoods are not strictly-defined.) Jackson has identified himself with the Roxbury neighborhood, and his city council district was centered around Roxbury.

Jackson attended Brookline High School and later graduated from the University of New Hampshire with a Bachelor of Arts degree in history. At university, Jackson founded a "Black Student Union" group which urged the university to work to diversify the makeup of its student body. Jackson was also elected the student body president. His alma mater granted him an additional honorary degree in 2018.

In 2018, Jackson reunited with his biological mother. His biological mother is one of the subjects of the Pulitzer Prize-winning book Common Ground by J. Anthony Lukas, which focused on desegregation busing in Boston.

== Early career ==
From 2004 until 2006, Jackson worked as a marketer for the drug manufacturer Alpharma.

In 2007, Jackson served as the industry director for information technology in Governor Deval Patrick’s Executive Office of Housing and Economic Development. Later, Jackson worked as the political director of Governor Patrick's successful 2010 reelection campaign.

== Boston City Council ==
Jackson served on the Boston City Council from 2011 until 2018.

=== Committee assignments ===
During his time on the council, he served as the chair of the Committee on Education, and the chair of the Special Committee on the Status of Black and Latino Men and Boys. Councillor Jackson also served as vice chair of the Committee on Healthy Women, Families and Communities. In addition, he was a member of six other Committees: City, Neighborhood Services and Veteran Affairs; Homelessness, Mental Health and Recovery; Housing and Community Development, Jobs, Wages and Workforce Development; Public Safety and Criminal Justice; and together with all other Councillors, the Committee of the Whole.

=== Unsuccessful 2009 campaign ===
Jackson's first attempt at running for a seat on the Boston City Council had been unsuccessful. In 2009, Jackson ran as an at-large candidate. He lost in this first attempt at running for elected office by 11,676 votes.

=== 2011 ===
Jackson ran in the 2011 special election for the 7th district Boston City Council seat to succeed Chuck Turner, who had been expelled from the City Council after a public corruption investigation by the Federal Bureau of Investigation. Jackson finished first out of seven candidates in the nonpartisan primary election and defeated Cornell Mills (the son of former State Senator Dianne Wilkerson) 82 percent to 16 percent in the general election.

=== 2012–2013 ===
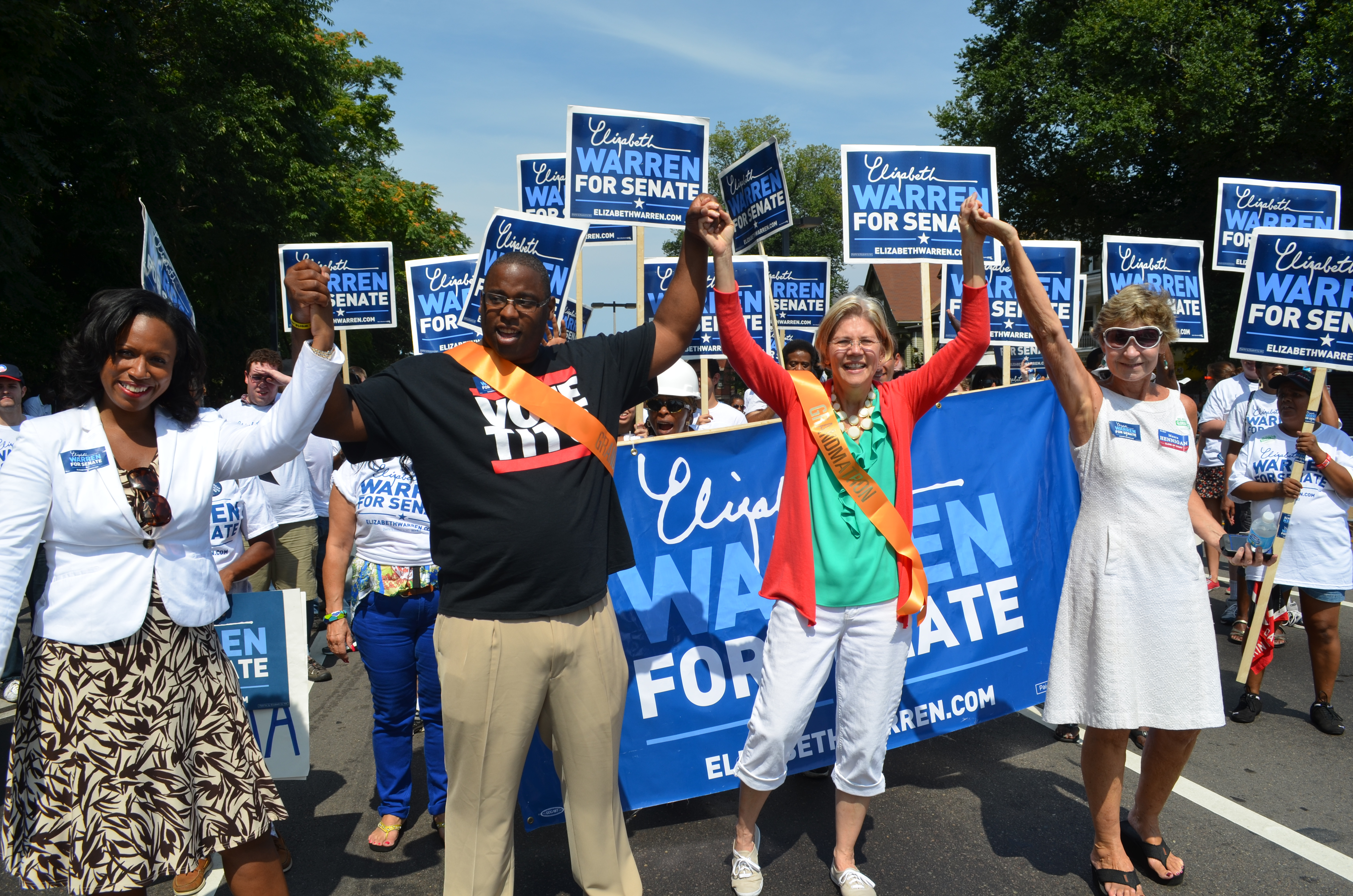
Jackson at the Maura Hennigan 2012 Boston Caribbean Carnival parade, with Ayanna Pressley, Elizabeth Warren, and Maura Hennigan

In the regularly-scheduled election in late-2011, Jackson was re-elected to a full term

==== Redistricting process ====
In 2012, after Mayor Thomas Menino opted to veto the City Council's first two proposals for its redistricted map, Jackson made his own proposal amending the previously proposed map. The City Council passed Jackson's map, which was then approved by Mayor Menino.

==== Consideration of a 2013 mayoral run ====
Jackson was speculated as a potential candidate to run in the 2013 Boston mayoral election, in which Menino was widely expected to seek re-election. In November 2012, Jackson stated that while he planned to instead run for re-election to the council, he "would consider" running for mayor if Menino decided to retire. Massachusetts First Lady Diane Patrick (wife of Governor Patrick) offered public encouragement for Jackson to consider a mayoral run if Menino were to retire, saying that he would make a great candidate. While Menino ultimately announced in March 2013 that he would retire rather than seek another term, Jackson did not run for mayor, announcing in early April that he would run for re-election to the council instead of mayor.

=== 2014–2015 ===
==== Unsuccessful campaign for council president ====
After being re-elected in November 2013, Jackson sought to secure the support of other councilors to choose him as the next council president. Also angling for the position was Bill Linehan (a conservative councilor) and Matt O'Malley. Both Jackson and O'Malley were considered to be members of the council's liberal wing (which had five returning members, including the two of them). An open agreement existed between O'Malley and Jackson that if one of them faltered in their effort to secure support, they would bow out in favor of the other in order to ensure that one of them could receive the votes of all five returning liberal members. At the same time, Linehan was regarded to be all-but-certain to receive the votes of the six returning council members (including himself) who were not part of the council's liberal wing. This dynamic meant that the council president race only had two obvious swing-votes, the council's only two newly elected members: Timothy McCarthy and Michelle Wu.

O'Malley had appeared close to prevailing for a period of time, having secured pledges of support from all returning liberal members (including Jackson), as well a pledge of support from McCarthy. This, however, left him one shy of a majority. Despite being aligned with the council's liberal wing, Wu had not joined the rest of that wing in pledging her support to his candidacy. O'Malley quickly lost ground after McCarthy withdrew his backing from him and instead gave his support to Linehan. This put Linehan in a position to receive the vote of a council majority to make him the next council president. Soon after this, Linehan received Wu's backing as well. Her backing came despite Linehan's and Wu's ideological differences. After O'Malley had failed to cobble together the support of a majority and Linehan had, Jackson attempted again in earnest to secure himself backing, but failed to peel away supporters from Linehan. Ayanna Pressley was the final council progressive to make a bid against Linehan for the presidency, with Linehan defeating her last-minute candidacy 7–5.

==== Proposal for a commission on black men and boys ====
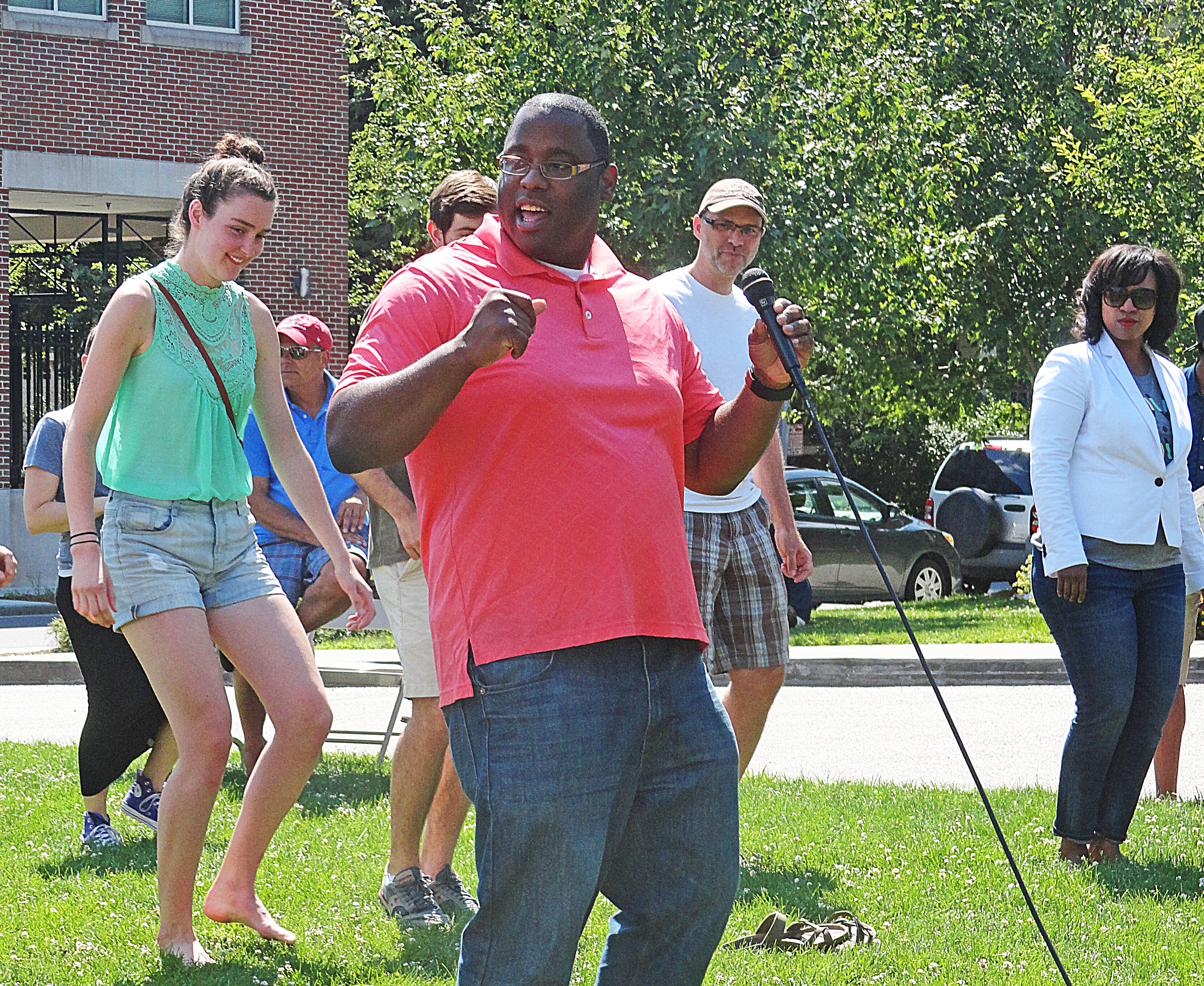
Jackson and fellow city councilor Ayanna Pressley (far right) attending Jamaica Plain Porchfest in 2015

In 2014, the City Council passed an ordinance by Jackson to create a commission on Black men and boys. Mayor Marty Walsh vetoed the ordinance, arguing that such a commission would, "duplicate and complicate efforts that my administration is already engaged in", and that the ordinance was written in such a way that he believed it would violate the Boston City Charter. Such a commission would eventually be formed in 2021; with the City Council passing a resolution to form a similar commission that was signed into effect by the acting mayor, Kim Janey, in September 2021.

==== Scrutiny of Boston's Olympic bid ====
In 2015, Jackson applied pressure to the non-governmental committee behind Boston's bid for the 2024 Summer Olympics for them to release the non-redacted copy of its original bid for the games. After the collapse of Boston's bid for the Olympics, the organization No Boston Olympics (which had opposed the bid) endorsed Jackson and three other incumbent Boston City Council members for re-election, praising them as "demonstrat[ing] leadership by asking tough questions" to the leaders behind Boston's Olympic bid.

==== Other matters ====
Jackson partnered with Suffolk County Sheriff Steven W. Tompkins to organize a city council committee hearing at the South Bay House of Correction. The hearing, held in September 2015, focused on soliciting input on strategies to decrease recidivism, and was the first hearing in the history of the Boston City Council to be held in a prison.

=== 2016–2017 ===
Jackson was again re-elected in 2015.

==== Opposition to Question 21 ====
Jackson was a prominent opponent of 2016 Massachusetts Question 2, which would have authorized an expansion of the number of charter schools in the state. In August 2016, the City Council voted 11–2 to adopt a resolution by Jackson and Matt O'Malley that voiced the council's opposition to the ballot measure.

== 2017 mayoral campaign ==
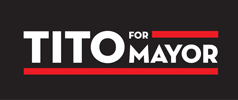
Mayoral campaign logo

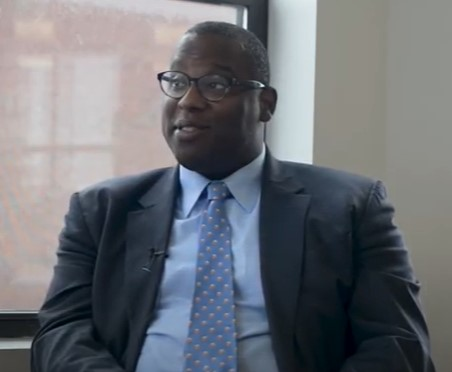
Jackson in 2017

In January 2017 Jackson announced he would run for Mayor of Boston in the 2017 mayoral election against the incumbent, Marty Walsh. In launching his candidacy, Jackson positioned himself as the "progressive" candidate in the race, and cited issues such as income inequality and housing as being central to his candidacy.

In the nonpartisan primary election held on September 26, 2017, Jackson received 29 percent of the votes to Walsh's 63 percent. Jackson moved onto the general election on November 7, 2017. Only 14 percent of the city's voting population cast votes compared to 31 percent in the previous preliminary mayoral contest.

Jackson focused much of his efforts on aiming to win the city's Black vote.

Jackson lost the general election race with 34 percent of the votes to Walsh's 65 percent.

== Post-City Council activities and career ==
Following his city council tenure, Jackson has been involved in ventures related to legal marijuana sales. Jackson has served as the chief executive of Verdant Medical, a Massachusetts medical and recreational marijuana company. He has also worked as the chief executive officer of the Apex Noire marijuana company.

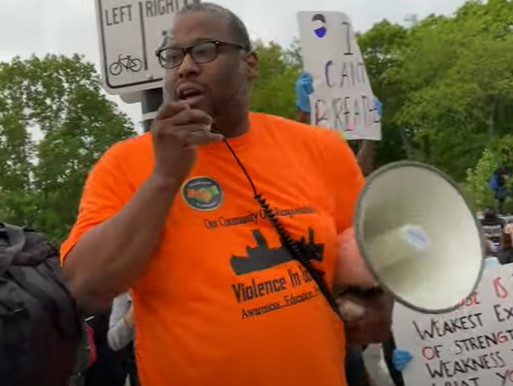
Jackson at a 2020 George Floyd protest in Franklin Park

Jackson tested positive for COVID-19 in March 2020, early into the COVID-19 pandemic in the United States

In the 2021 Boston mayoral election, Jackson endorsed the unsuccessful primary election campaign of Acting Mayor Kim Janey. After Janey was eliminated in the primary, he endorsed the successful general election campaign of Michelle Wu.

On March 16, 2022, Jackson was one of fourteen names put forth by the Boston City Council as nominees serve on the newly established Boston Commission on Black Men and Boys. Mayor Wu had the authority to select seven of those nominees to appoint to the commission. The commission has 21 members, seven of which are selected by the mayor after being first recommended from the Boston City Council, while the remainder are selected by the mayor independently from a pool of applicants. On May 19, 2022, Mayor Wu announced that she would appoint Jackson to the commission.

In October 2022, Jackson spoke before the Boston City Council in support of a proposal by the City Council to raise the pay of city councilors by 20%. He claimed in his remarks that after his election to the city council, he nearly lost his house to foreclosure. While the amendment was passed by the council, Mayor Wu vetoed it. Wu supported an 11% increase, which had been the recommendation of Boston's compensation advisory board, but opposed a 20% increase.

== Electoral history ==
=== City Council ===
2009 Boston City Council at-large election
Candidates	Preliminary Election		General Election	
Candidates	Votes	%	Votes	%
John R. Connolly (incumbent)	35,182	18.08	51,362	18.35
Stephen J. Murphy (incumbent)	30,365	15.61	51,008	18.22
Felix G. Arroyo	25,859	13.29	45,144	16.13
Ayanna Pressley	16,866	8.67	41,879	14.96
Tito Jackson	12,535	6.44	30,203	10.79
Andrew Kenneally	12,653	6.50	24,249	8.66
Tomás González	10,122	5.20	18,310	6.54
Doug Bennett	10,529	5.41	16,842	6.02
Ego Ezedi	9,260	4.76		
Hiep Quoc Nguyen	7,691	3.95		
Sean H. Ryan	6,665	3.43		
Jean-Claude Sanon	5,386	2.77		
Robert Fortes	5,071	2.61		
Bill Trabucco	3,132	1.61		
Scotland Willis	2,639	1.36		
all others	595	0.31	951	0.34

2011 Boston City Council district 7 special election
Candidate	Votes	%
Tito Jackson	2,829	81.98
Cornell Mills	557	16.14
Althea Garrison (write-in)	46	1.33
all others	19	0.55
Total votes	3,451	100

2011 Boston City Council district 7 election
Candidates	Preliminary Election		General Election	
Candidates	Votes	%	Votes	%
Tito Jackson (incumbent)	1,876	76.07	4,818	84.35
Sheneal Parker	273	11.07	799	13.99
Althea Garrison	216	8.76	47†	0.82
Roy Owens	85	3.45		
all others	16†	0.65	48†	0.84
Total	2,466	100	5,712	100

† write-in votes

2013 Boston City Council district 7 election
Candidate	Votes	%
Tito Jackson (incumbent)	7,676	74.61
Roy Owens	1,680	16.33
Jamarhl C. Crawford (write-in)	653	6.35
all others	279	2.71
Total votes	10,288	100

2015 Boston City Council district 7 election
Candidates	Preliminary Election		General Election	
Candidates	Votes	%	Votes	%
Tito Jackson (incumbent)	1,409	66.40	2,983	66.64
Charles L. Clemons Jr.	381	17.95	1,444	32.26
Haywood Fennell Sr.	104	4.90	16†	0.36
Althea Garrison	98	4.62	0†	0.00
Roy Owens	74	3.49		
Kevin A. Dwire	34	1.60		
all others	22†	1.04	33†	0.74
Total	2,122	100	4,476	100

† write-in votes

=== Mayor ===
2017 Boston mayoral election
Candidates	Preliminary election		General election	
Candidates	Votes	%	Votes	%
Marty Walsh (incumbent)	34,882	62.52%	70,197	65.37%
Tito Jackson	16,216	29.07%	36,472	33.97%
Robert Cappucci	3,736	6.70%		
Joseph Wiley	529	0.95%		
all others	428	0.77	708	0.66
Total	55,791	100	107,377	100
