= Citywide Educational Coalition =

The Citywide Educational Coalition (CWEC) is a tax-exempt, non-profit educational reform organization whose goal is to provide reliable and objective information on the Boston Public Schools to parents and citizens, enabling citizens to participate in policy making directly and through their school committee and increasing support for public education in Boston, Massachusetts.

The Citywide Educational Coalition was created in Boston, Massachusetts, in order to create a community agenda for the Boston Public Schools. Incorporated in 1973 with the mission of circulating clear and accurate information regarding education reform, the Coalition was actively involved in a number of major decisions influencing the Boston School System, including the desegregation of Boston Public Schools.

== Background ==
The CWEC was formed in 1972 by Mary Ellen Smith, who brought together parents and concerned citizens from across Boston who felt a need for involvement in the selection of a new superintendent of Boston Public Schools. This group, composed of parents, teachers, school administrators, church groups, community groups and concerned individuals came together around several major issues facing the Boston Public Schools: the search for superintendent, the need to improve quality of education in public schools, the desegregation crisis in Boston and the lack of reliable and accurate information about schools. Since its founding, the CWEC has focused its energy on monitoring the implementation of the desegregation order, community organizing around educational issues, representing citizens in areas of educational decision making and on research and public information activities.

== Desegregation of Boston Public Schools ==
In the 1954 landmark case, Brown v. Board of Education, the legal basis for segregation within public schools is dismantled. The ruling declared that racial segregation violates the rights of United States citizens according to the Constitution, which guarantees equal protection of laws for all American citizens.

Eighteen years later, in 1972, de facto segregation still existed in the Boston Public School System as a result of school districting practices by geographical location, which remained largely segregated within the city. A class action suit was filed on behalf of fifteen parents and forty-three children, with Tallulah Morgan as lead plaintiff, in the case that would come to be known as Morgan v. Hennigan. At that time sixty-eight schools in Boston were racially imbalanced and 30,000 Boston students used public transportation to get to school. In 1974, Judge W. Arthur Garrity sided with the plaintiffs in Morgan vs. Hennigan and stated Boston School Committee had engaged in segregation. Garrity then ordered the school committee to implement the State Board of Education's Racial Imbalance plan until they produced a plan of their own for desegregation. September 12, 1974 marked the first day of school under this new program. The anti-desegregation group Restore our Alienated Rights (ROAR) called for a two-week boycott of schools, which caused a violent reaction, especially in South Boston, and left eighteen school buses damaged citywide.

During this time, members of the Citywide Educational Coalition (CWEC) shifted focus to support the needs of the Boston school system, as well as its students and parents during this unstable period. By disseminating accurate information to parents through the Rumor Control Center and its newsletters, reports and parent guides, the Coalition actively participated in the desegregation of Boston schools. Throughout this volatile process, the Coalition developed safety procedures in the schools and along the bus routes, worked with students, parents, teachers and school administrators to improve the educational experience. The CWEC developed a mailing list of over 3,000 people in neighborhoods across the city of racial and ethnic groups and also mobilized over 500 parent volunteers who worked to promote calm and diffuse violence in neighborhoods throughout the city, in the process gathering supporters with a continuing interest in bettering the school system as a whole.

By stepping into the space created by the failure of the Boston School Department and the city to distribute credible information on the desegregation of public schools, the CWEC continued to build its constituency. This expanding support, in combination with the unprecedented focus on public schools as a result of the desegregation orders created the perfect environment for the CWEC to use segregation related issues as a vehicle for pursuing broader educational reform.

== Projects ==
The Citywide Educational Coalition (CWEC) has produced and widely circulated five major publications: Parents’ Guide to Magnet Schools (1977), Magnet School in Boston: A Guide for Parents and Students (1978), Survey of Magnet Schools in Three Cities (1978), Boston Public Schools: A Guide for Parents and Students (1979) and The Basic Skills Improvement Program: What Parents Should Expect (1979). The CWEC has also recruited and trained a number of parent researchers to assist the Boston School Department in their production of the 1980 Guide to Elementary and Magnet Schools as well as publishing annual analyses of the Boston Public School Budget. These publications attempt to increase parent and citizen participation by providing clear, concise, objective information that is free of jargon and encourages parents and concerned citizens to act toward improving their child's school and schools throughout the city.

Beginning in August 1974, the CWEC published a monthly newsletter first known as "Coalition" and later as "Common Ground." Nearly 20,000 copies were distributed each month with the help of volunteers to households throughout the city of Boston.

One of CWEC's major projects was the creation of BPS Watch, a program that requires the Coalition decide upon a single issue facing the Boston Public Schools, such as reading competency, and research it in depth. The goal is to find ways in which this specific issue can be addressed by both the school and the community to improve its function within the school system.

CWEC acts also in an advisory capacity and technical assistant to the School Department. Members have become focused on basic skill competency and have examined vocational/occupational education planning with Boston schools.
