= South Boston High School =

Location
- 95 G Street; South Boston, Massachusetts; United States; 42°19′57″N 71°02′42″W

Information
- Type: Public
- Opened: September 1901
- School district: Boston Public Schools
- Athletics conference: Boston City League

South Boston High School was a public high school located in South Boston, Massachusetts, United States. It was part of Boston Public Schools. The school closed in 2003, and its former facility was occupied by Excel High School until its closure in June 2026.

The building is now closed for capital improvements, while plans to bring a new high school back to the site under the supervision of the Boston Public Schools occur in parallel. The new school is tentatively slated to open for the 2028-2029 academic year.

== History ==
South Boston High School was built on Telegraph Hill in Dorchester Heights in 1901. It was the first high school in the South Boston neighborhood.

During the Boston busing crisis in the 1970s, several racial incidents took place at the school. On September 12, 1974, the first day of school, only 124 students attended. The school anticipated an enrollment of about 1,300.

On November 20, several fights broke out in the school. It began when a White male student let a door slam in the face of a Black female student.

An even more violent incident occurred several weeks later on December 11, when Michael Faith, a White male student, was stabbed by another student, a Black male. News of his stabbing spread quickly around the neighborhood, and by mid-afternoon, about 700 people had surrounded the school to confront the black students at the end of the school day. The students were able to escape when the crowd chased after three decoy buses.

In 1975, the Boston School Committee was stripped of most of its control over Boston school integration. Judge W. Arthur Garrity Jr. said that desegregation was not working at South Boston High School and accused the school committee of thwarting his court order. The school was placed into receivership that year under the administration of a district superintendent.

South Boston High School continued to receive negative attention for the violence that erupted there in 1974. In 1980, Michael Tierney and Danis Terris founded and launched Mosaic, a publication consisting of autobiographical stories, photographs, and poetry from students at South Boston High School.

The school building, now renamed the South Boston Education Complex, houses Excel High School.

It is located on 95 G St. South Boston, MA.

== Notable alumni ==
- James "Whitey" Bulger, mobster (did not graduate)
- Forrester Blanchard Washington, Social Worker, Professor, Civil Rights Activist
- John Ferruggio, in-flight director who led the evacuation of Pan Am Flight 93
- Raymond Flynn, Mayor of Boston
- John Kerrigan, Acting Mayor of Boston, Boston City Council
- Stephen Lynch, U.S. Congressman
- Bill McColgan, sportscaster
- Joe Moakley, U.S. Congressman
- Kevin Weeks, mobster
