= Susan Lukas =

American writer

- Born: October 19, 1940; Chicago, Illinois, U.S.
- Died: April 5, 2008 (aged 67); Sparkill, New York, U.S.
- Education: UCLA (B.A.); Hunter College School of Social Work (CSW)
- Occupations: Writer, psychotherapist
- Notable work: Where to Start and What to Ask
- Spouse: Christopher Lukas
- Children: Megan Lukas; Gabriela Lukas

Susan Lukas is an American writer known for her books centered on female characters.

== Early life and education ==
Born to Hugo and Rose Ries in Evanston, Illinois, Lukas went to Beverly Hills High School and then graduated from the University of California, Los Angeles where she majored in philosophy.

== Career ==
Lukas is known for her writings. In addition to writing books, Lukas worked as a film critic for KCBS (AM).

The first of her three novels, Fat Emily, was published in 1974. Stereopticon, the second, was published in 1978. She then worked as the ombudsman for Westchester County, New York, government. And in 1981, her third novel Morgana's Fault was published.

In the 1980’s, Lukas attended the Hunter College School of Social Work, then went on to practice psychotherapy in New York City and Nyack, NY. She wrote a book, Where To Start And What To Ask, which was published by W.W. Norton.

In John Curtis' review of Where To Start And What To Ask he wrote: “Susan Lukas has written a most useful book for the new social worker, therapist, or case worker, a handbook for interviewing new clients. Frankly, this book could serve as a textbook in introductory social work, social service, or therapy classes. A careful reading should help the beginning social worker or therapist develop skills needed to better serve the client’s interests.”

== Personal life ==
In 1962 she married television producer Christopher Lukas in Los Angeles. The couple had two children and lived in multiple places including New York City, London, and San Francisco.
