= Big Trouble (Lukas book) =

1997 non-fiction book by J. Anthony Lukas

- Author: J. Anthony Lukas
- Language: English
- Subject: Assassination of Frank Steunenberg
- Publisher: Simon & Schuster
- Publication date: 1997
- Publication place: United States
- ISBN: 978-0-684-80858-1
- LC Class: F746 .L84

Big Trouble: A Murder in a Small Western Town Sets Off a Struggle for the Soul of America is a 1997 non-fiction book by J. Anthony Lukas, published by Simon & Schuster. The book discusses the assassination of Frank Steunenberg in 1905 and the resulting trial.

== Background ==
As part of his research Lukas used historical documents with the total number of pages numbering in the thousands.

Lukas committed suicide while in the process of finishing the last revision. Clyde Haberman of The New York Times reported that "several friends" stated he felt severe depression, with his agent Amanda Urban stating that Lukas believed the book was inadequate, even though Urban felt this was not the case.

== Contents ==
The book, with about 875 pages, discusses private detective organizations like the Pinkertons who worked against organized labor as well as the livelihood of Steunenberg. Dan Nailen of the Moscow-Pullman Daily News described the murder trial as the work's "centerpiece" and that other stories have "incredible detail and research".

== Reception ==
It was a finalist for the 1998 Pulitzer Prize for History.

Richard Lingeman in The New York Times wrote that the author "excavated a stratum of American history, tracing the fault line of class that sundered society in another time, and persists in our own." Lingeman stated that the ending portion is "more problematic" compared to the rest of the book due to presenting "tenuous" evidence that William D. Haywood had committed the crime.

Nailen wrote that the book had "richly detailed history" and highlighted "Lukas' ability to act as detective and editor in putting the tale together in an accurate and compelling way." Nailen also stated that the "best and worst part" of the work is the author having an "obsession with telling the whole story". Kirkus Reviews wrote that the book was "a fitting epitaph for" the deceased author and that it is "Provocative, maddening, deeply disturbing", but that there is "excessive detail" due to a lack of a "coherent story line".
