= Pag-ibig at Kamatayan =

Pag-ibig at Kamatayan: Nobelang Tagalog ("Love and Death: A Tagalog Novel") is a 1912 Tagalog-language novel written by Filipino novelist Mamerto A. Hilario. The 194-page romance novel was first published in Manila, Philippines by G. Modesta Lanuza and printed by Limbagang Magiting ni Honorio Lopez (Heroic Printing Press of Honorio Lopez). The second edition of the novel was published in 1923 by Ilagan at Sanga (Ilagan and Sanga).

== See also ==
- Hiwaga ng Pag-ibig
