= Leon Trilling =

Aeronautical engineer and historian of technology (1924–2018)

Leon Trilling (July 15, 1924 Białystok, Poland – April 20, 2018) was an American aeronautical engineer and historian of technology. He was professor emeritus in MIT’s Department of Aeronautics and Astronautics and the Program in Science, Technology, and Society, and co-founder of the Massachusetts Department of Education's statewide METCO (Metropolitan Council for Educational Opportunity) Program. He retired from MIT in 1994 and in 1996, received the university's Martin Luther King Leadership Award “in recognition of his deep and enduring commitment to improving the quality of education for people of color.”

== Early life and education ==
Trilling was born to Oswald and Regina (Zakhejm) Trillingk, a Jewish family living in Białystok, Poland. Before coming to the United States in 1940, the family fled to France in the 1930s. Trilling enrolled in Caltech (BS in mechanical engineering in 1944, a master of science in 1946, and a PhD in aeronautics in 1948) and in 1945, became a naturalized citizen.

== Early career ==
He spent a year in Paris on a Fulbright Scholarship after spending time as a Caltech research fellow and instructor. In 1951, he began his career at MIT as a research associate in the Department of Aeronautical Engineering. In 1963, he studied gas dynamics at the University of Paris on a Guggenheim Fellowship. He joined the faculty of the Program in Science, Technology, and Society, based in the School of Humanities, Arts, and Social Sciences, in 1978.

== METCO ==
Trilling was president of the Brookline School Committee. Working with community members and Governor and Mrs. Michael Dukakis, they launched METCO which is the “second-oldest voluntary program in the country dedicated to increasing diversity in schools.”. It was initially implemented by the implemented by the Federation for Housing and Equal Rights (FHER).
