= Susan Batson =

American producer, actress, author, and acting coach

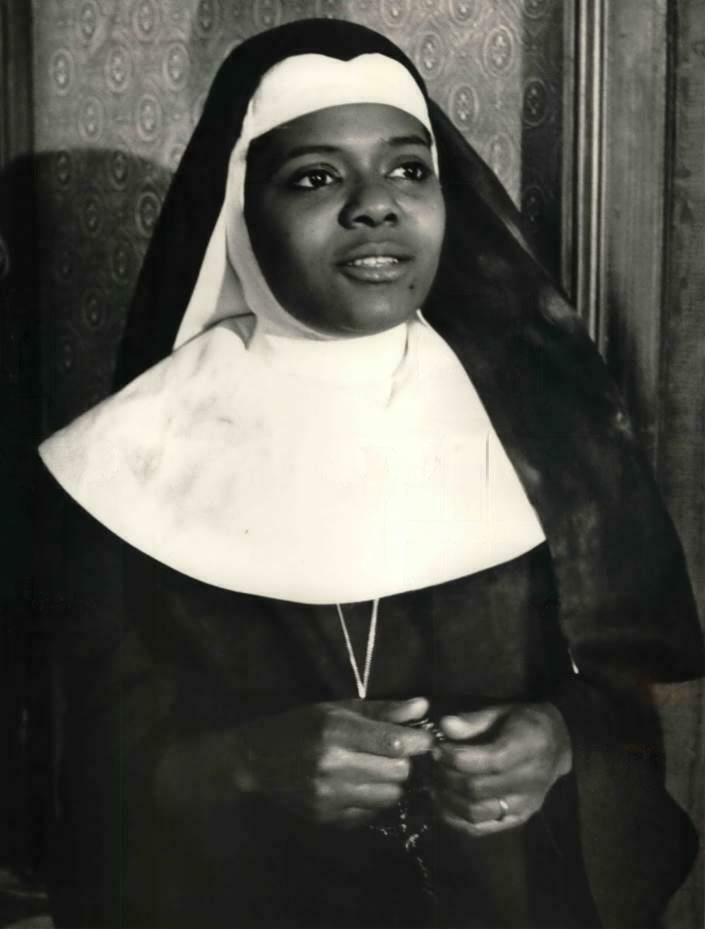
- Batson in Gunsmoke (1969)
- Education: Emerson College
- Occupations: Actress; author; acting coach
- Years active: 1965–present
- Website: www.susanbatsonstudionyc.com

Susan Batson is an American producer, actress, author, acting coach, and a life member of the Actors Studio. Batson graduated from Girls Latin School and Emerson College.

One of three sisters born to John Batson and Ruth (Watson) Batson (the latter a noted civil rights activist), Susan trained with Harold Clurman, Uta Hagen, Herbert Berghof at HB Studio, and Lee Strasberg. She has coached notable actresses, including Academy Award (Oscar)-winning actresses Nicole Kidman and Juliette Binoche.

Batson won the 1971 Obie Award for her performance in AC-DC. On Broadway, she performed in George M! (1968) and The Leaf People (1975), and produced the 2006 production of A Raisin in the Sun. Her work in Adventures of a Black Girl in Search of God won the Los Angeles Drama Critics Award for her.

== Filmography ==
=== Film ===
Year	Title	Role	Notes
1970	WUSA	Teenage Girl	
1977	The Choirboys	Sabrina	
1978	House Calls	Shirley	
1982	Love Child	Brenda	1985-Stone Pillow- Ruby
1993	Quand Fred rit		Short film
1996	Girl 6	Acting coach	
1996	Get on the Bus	Dr. Cook	
1999	Summer of Sam	Bed Stuy Woman Interviewed	
2000	Bamboozled	Orchid Dothan	
2005	Everyone's Depressed	Annette	Short film
2006	Running Out of Time in Hollywood		

=== Television ===
Year	Title	Role	Notes
1969	The New People	Elisa Rhodes	Episode: "Comes the Revolution, We Use the Girls' Shower"
1969	Gunsmoke	Sister Blanche	Episode: "The Sisters"
1969	Gidget Grows Up	Diana Otessa	TV movie
1971	The Interns	Hollie	Episode: "The Choice"
1976	Delvecchio	Clerk	Episode: "Good Cop"
1976	All's Fair	Waitress	Episode: "The Gang Leader"
1977	Police Story	Baby Rose	Episode: "Trial Board"
1977	The Incredible Hulk	Mrs. Maier	Episode: "The Incredible Hulk"
1976–77	Good Times	Waitress / Barmaid / Clerk	3 episodes
1978	A Question of Love	Mavis	TV movie
1980	Palmerstown, U.S.A.		Episode: "Palmerstown, U.S.A."
1985	Stone Pillow	Ruby	TV movie
1991	Law & Order	Mavis	Episode: "A Death in the Family"
2003	Made	Herself	Episode: "Angie Is Made Into an Actress"
2017	America's Next Top Model	Herself	Episode: "And Action!"
