= Tallulah Morgan =

Main plaintiff in the historical case Morgan v. Hennigan

Tallulah Morgan (born 1948) was the main plaintiff in the historical case Morgan v. Hennigan, which led to the desegregation of the Boston school system in the 1970s.

== Early life ==
Her background seems somewhat unclear as she is occasionally identified as a Boston Public Schools student. However, in-depth sources, like journalist Anthony Lukacs's book Common Ground: A Turbulent Decade on the Lives of Three American Families, identify Morgan as "a twenty-four-year-old mother of three school-age children."

That seems to be verified by the initial complaint filed in Morgan v. Hennigan, which lists a Mrs. Tallulah Morgan and her three children: Petri, Kimberly, and Kirsten.

Morgan was a black, working-class Boston resident, and the complaint reflects her frustration with Boston Public Schools' policy of racial segregation and underfunding of black-majority schools.

== Morgan v. Hennigan ==
She headed the list of plaintiffs in the class action lawsuit against the Boston School Committee. The School Committee, whose director, James Hennigan, was named the main defendant, was accused of intentionally bringing about and maintaining racial segregation in the Boston School District.

The lawsuit was filed on March 14, 1972 by the Boston Chapter of the National Association for the Advancement of Colored People (NAACP). The judge assigned to the case was Judge W. Arthur Garrity, who reached his decision on June 21, 1974.

The plaintiffs claimed that through practices such as "the adoption and maintenance of pupil assignment policies, the establishment and manipulation of attendance areas and district lines reflecting segregated residential patterns, the establishment of grade structures and feeder patterns, the administration of school capacity, enlargement, and construction policies, [and] transportation practices," the Boston School Committee had in effect denied black school children equal protection under the law.

Another accusation was that the School Committee had discriminated in the hiring and assignment of faculty, and the distribution of resources, discriminated in the admission of children to certain schools, and knowingly maintained a pattern of lower instructional expenditure for some children which all violated the Thirteenth and Fourteenth Amendments and resulted in denying black children constitutionally granted equal access to education.

Garrity's enquiry established that the racial segregation of the Boston school system was a fact. He found that the city defendants had in no ways used the tool of redistricting to alleviate racial segregation despite being aware of the possibility. It had, in one case, used redistricting to perpetuate racial segregation in schools.

Similarly, he found that the established feeder patterns, open enrolment, faculty hire and promotion policies all contributed to the perpetuation of racial segregation and the provision of lower quality education in schools attended by predominantly black students.

== Legacy ==
Her victory in the class action lawsuit led to major efforts in dismantling the dual system of education. The court concluded that the defendants had, on multiple occasions, taken decisions to perpetuate racial segregation in the Boston school system and so had acted unconstitutionally.

The court outlined "remedial guidelines," which were aimed at reversing the consequences of the policies that had resulted in racial segregation, as "neutral conduct is no longer constitutionally sufficient."

Judge Arthur W. Garrity mandated and oversaw the desegregation of Boston Public Schools through busing, which began with the busing of black students from the Roxbury neighborhood to the white, working-class neighborhood of South Boston and vice versa. The resulting crisis began with the implementation of the busing program in the fall of 1974 and lasted for several years. The Boston Busing Crisis ultimately became one of the North's most notable desegregation battles.

The Tallulah Morgan Education Foundation was established in September 1979. The foundation's mission was to represent black Bostonians who sought better educational opportunities for students of color. The foundation's work including the creation of scholarship and grant funds to support black students and civil rights organizations, conferences for desegregation advocates, and grassroots community organizing, including surveys on public perceptions of the Boston Public Schools and desegregation efforts. It is not clear that the foundation is still operational.
