= Jean McGuire =

American educator and civil rights leader

Jean McGuire (born 1931) is an American educator and civil rights leader. She was the first African American woman to be elected to a seat on the Boston School Committee in 1981, during the Boston busing desegregation era. She helped found the Metropolitan Council for Educational Opportunity (METCO) in 1966 and served as its executive director from 1973 to 2016.

McGuire grew up in Massachusetts and lived in Washington, D.C. during the 1930s and 1940s, when schools were mostly segregated and unequal. She attended Howard University and Boston State College.

== Biography ==
Jean McGuire was born in 1931. She was raised in and around Boston, attending Brookline public schools where she was among the only Black students. She moved to Washington, DC following the death of her grandmother and attended the then-segregated Dunbar High School. After her graduation she enrolled in Howard University before returning to Boston where she attended Boston State College and earned a degree in education in 1961.

During the 1960s she struggled to reform the education system. She fought for more well-trained and, preferably, black teachers for the black community. She pointed out that the State College at Boston had a very low number of black students, despite the fact that it is located in Roxbury and had very reasonable tuition. She spent two years as a teacher at the Louisa May Alcott School before taking a position with Boston Public Schools as a Black Pupil Adjustment Counselor.

In 1966, McGuire helped to found the Metropolitan Council for Educational Opportunity (METCO), one of the largest and oldest segregation/desegregation non-profit organizations in Massachusetts. She became the fourth Executive Director of METCO in 1973. In this position, she helped provide educational opportunities to numerous urban school children. She remained director of the organization until 2016.

McGuire was elected to the Boston School Committee in 1981, the first African American woman to do so. Her friend John D. O'Bryant, the first Black person on the Committee, had encouraged her to run. She held the position on the School Committee for ten years, up to the point when the elected school committee was disbanded and replaced with a mayoral-appointed committee. Additionally, she has served as a board member on various associations including the Boston Children's Museum, Community Change, Inc., Encampment for Citizenship, Massachusetts Women's Political Caucus and the Black Educators Alliance of MA (BEAM).

McGuire was interviewed about her activism and work for METCO in episode thirteen, "The Keys to the Kingdom," of the documentary, Eyes on the Prize, which weaves together personal recollections and interviews, photographs, television footage, and archival materials to recount the fight to end segregation in the United States.

In 2004, McGuire won the Boston Ethical Community's Humanitarian of the Year award. She was awarded a Lifetime Achievement Award from Community Change for her work in the education system and segregated communities in 2012 and received an honorary doctor of public service degree from Tufts University in 2017. "We all have the ability to do something good," McGuire said, "we just need the proper resources to help make our goals and abilities possible."

On October 11, 2022, McGuire was stabbed five times in Franklin Park while walking her dog. She was hospitalized. By 2023, she had recovered to where she returned to her daily Franklin Park walks.
