= Forrester Blanchard Washington =

Forrester Blanchard Washington (1887–1963) was an American pioneer in social work.

== Early life and education ==
Washington was the first of four children born to John Washington and Lucy Wily Washington in Salem, Massachusetts in 1887. His location somewhat protected him from the open racism that inhibited that lives of his southern African American peers (Barrow, 2007). "Washington's family raised him in this comparatively tolerant environment and was able to provide him with the opportunity for a rich education, one that was exceptional for African Americans of that era" (p. 201). His family moved to Boston where Washington graduated from South Boston High School in 1905. He graduated from Tufts College (now University) in 1909. He pursued a post-baccalaureate degree in economics at Harvard University from 1912 to 1914 and graduated from Columbia University with a master's degree in social economy in 1917. He was married in 1918. Washington was a National Urban League (NUL) fellow and received his social work training at the New York School of Social Work, which subsequently launched him into his career (Barrow, 2007).

== Detroit Urban League and WWI ==
In the following years Washington held a number of important leadership positions. In his first position he served as the first director of the Detroit Urban League (DUL). He led the DUL when the city experienced the rapid growth of its black population during the World War I era migration. Washington called for equal employment opportunities in Detroit while urging the black migrants to adjust to urban life. However, his leadership of the DUL was short-lived when he was drafted into the U.S. Army to fight World War I. Washington was later released from the army when Dr. George Edmond Haynes (another social welfare pioneer) obtained his release so that he could help assist Dr. Haynes with the newly created Division of Negro Economics within the U.S. Department of Labor (Barrow, 2007). Although defunded and short lived, according to Barrow (2007):

This office had been set up to address the host of problems stemming from an insufficient number of jobs available to African Americans and their increasingly militant call for humane treatment. Because of the specter of racial warfare, at the time the federal government was interested in sharing responsibilities with able African American leaders.

== Work in the Federal Emergency Relief Administration and Atlanta University School of Social Work ==
Thereafter, Washington returned to Detroit where he would eventually become the director of the NUL affiliate in Philadelphia called the Armstrong Association of Philadelphia in 1923. He also became director of research for Associated Charities (Barrow, 2007). Three years later he became the director and educator at the Atlanta University School of Social Work (now the M. Whitney Young, Jr. School of Social Work). It was from this post that Washington would be recruited to become the director of Negro Work in the Federal Emergency Relief Administration (FERA) in February 1934 (2007). As it relates to his tenure at the Atlanta University Social of Social Work, Barrow states:

Through his own work serving the social-welfare needs of the African American population from 1917 to 1927, Washington discovered firsthand the benefit of social services being provided to African Americans by people within their own communities.

As such, Washington felt that it was important to train other African American social workers to work with their own people. Washington's work was meaningful, but in 1927 he reached a career plateau and desired a change. Washington understood that, although there had been a northward migration, most African Americans still lived in the South. They had many unmet needs and few people and institutions to help them. He wrote to an associate and described "an epiphany" (Washington, January 5, 1928, as cited by Barrow, 2007). He had been encouraging other trained social workers to relocate to the South and finally recognized that "the only common sense thing [was for him] to practice what he preached" (Washington, January 5, 1928, as cited by Barrow, 2007). He made a decision to "consecrate his life to social work education" (Washington, January 5, 1928, as cited by Barrow, 2007) and accepted the position of Director of the Atlanta School of Social Work in 1927 (p. 177). This speaks to Washington's commitment to education, to his people, and to the social work profession. As aforementioned, this position led to Washington's subsequent position in the FERA during the great depression. The Great Depression called for new bold action to alleviate widespread suffering as a result of 1929 crash. This action came from the newly elected president, Franklin Delano Roosevelt (FDR) in 1932. One of the biggest pieces of legislation of the New Deal was the FERA which disbursed $500 million in grants for direct relief. Over its three-year existence, FERA spent more than 4 billion dollars in relief. However, due to the discrimination of the time, African Americans were disadvantaged and sometimes did not fully benefit from this relief. As a result of their growing displeasure and political voice of the 1930s President Roosevelt created appointments of a diverse group of African American intellectuals known as "The Black Cabinet" of which Washington was a member (Barrow, 2007).

In 1934 Washington was appointed director of Negro Work in the FERA under FDR. As director, Washington criticized and publicized the unequal treatment of African Americans at the hands of state FERA administrators and white employers. Washington used his post to assert that the federal government had the responsibility of ensuring equal employment opportunities rather than allow them to develop dependency on federal relief. He called for equal employment and educational opportunities to insure that black workers would be self-supporting. He also called on fellow social workers to assume an activist political role in advocating both within the Roosevelt Administration and in the private sector for greater work opportunities for African Americans. In the face of continued silence and resistance from the Roosevelt administration, Washington resigned as director of Negro Work at FERA and returned to his post with the Atlanta School for Social Work in 1935. He remained there until his retirement in 1960. He died in 1963 in Atlanta, Georgia.

== Washington's Social Work/Welfare Legacy and Conclusion ==
As it relates to Washington's social welfare philosophy, it is inherent in his professional life as highlighted by his career above. However, Barrow (2007) sums it up the best:

Washington was always concerned with the broader social, political, and economic needs of African Americans. In both the North and South, he took an early stand on the importance of African American employment and self-help because he believed that personal integrity emanated from employment and self-sufficiency (p. 202).

Washington was/is a social work and welfare pioneer who "modeled a principle response to social injustice" as a government advisor and who fought the unfair policies and the social welfare structures of the 1930s. Additionally, Gary & Gary, (1994) as cited by Barrow (2007) posit that:

Arguably, no one deserves more credit for developing the Atlanta School of Social Work than Forrester Blanchard Washington, who effectively led the institution through some of its most difficult periods. As a result of his successes in developing the school and producing a cadre of well‐trained African American social workers, Washington's leadership and accomplishments are intricately tied to the development of social work and social welfare in the southern United States (p. 179).

Thus, Washington life and contributions are an important part of social welfare history because it increases our understanding of the evolution of contemporary social welfare and social work education. It also expands knowledge about African American's contributions to social welfare policy and the social work profession as a whole. His contributions can encourage us (particularly African American social workers) to strive toward social justice, advocacy, and a stronger commitment to the profession.

== Sources ==
- Barrow, F. (2007). Forrester Blanchard Washington and his advocacy for African Americans in the new deal. Social Work, 52(3), 201-208
- Barrow, F. (2007). More than a school—A promotional agency for social welfare: Forrester Blanchard Washington's leadership of the Atlanta university school of social work, 1927–1954. Arete, 31(1/2), 175–193.
- Carlton-LaNey, I. B. (2001). African American leadership: An empowerment tradition in social welfare history. National Association of Social Workers Press: Washington, DC.
