= Boston desegregation busing crisis =

Period when Boston public schools were under court control

Boston busing desegregation
- Part of the Post–civil rights era
- Date: 1974–1976
- Location: Boston, Massachusetts
- Caused by: Desegregation busing ordered in accordance with the Massachusetts Racial Imbalance Act of 1965 in Phase I (June 1974) and Phase II (May 1975) rulings from Massachusetts U.S. District Court Judge W. Arthur Garrity Jr. in Morgan v. Hennigan.
- Result: From September 1974 to September 1976, at least 40 riots occur (including many interracial riots).; In December 1975, Judge Garrity orders South Boston High School put under federal receivership.; In June 1976, U.S. Supreme Court under Chief Justice Warren E. Burger unanimously declines to hear Boston School Committee's appeal of Phase II ruling.; In September 1985, Judge Garrity orders jurisdiction of Boston Public Schools returned to city School Committee.; In May 1990, Judge Garrity delivers final ruling in Morgan v. Hennigan.; Incidents of interracial violence would continue through at least 1993.

The desegregation of Boston public schools (1974–1988) was a period in which the Boston Public Schools were under court control to desegregate through a system of busing students. The call for desegregation and the first years of its implementation led to a series of racial protests and riots that brought national attention, particularly from 1974 to 1976. In response to the Massachusetts legislature's enactment of the 1965 Racial Imbalance Act, which ordered the state's public schools to desegregate, W. Arthur Garrity Jr. of the United States District Court for the District of Massachusetts laid out a plan for compulsory busing of students between predominantly white and black areas of the city. The hard control of the desegregation plan lasted for over a decade. It influenced Boston politics and contributed to demographic shifts of Boston's school-age population, leading to an unprecedented level of violence and turmoil in the city's streets and classrooms, national headlines, a decline of public-school enrollment, and white flight to the suburbs. Full control of the desegregation plan was transferred to the Boston School Committee in 1988; in 2013, the busing system was replaced by one with dramatically reduced busing.

== History ==
=== 1962 and earlier ===
In the 1850 case Roberts v. City of Boston, the Massachusetts Supreme Judicial Court ruled there was no constitutional basis for declaring segregated schools illegal. In 1868, the Fourteenth Amendment to the United States Constitution added the Equal Protection Clause. Despite this, the United States Supreme Court case Plessy v. Ferguson decided in 1896 that separate but equal schools were an acceptable arrangement. This was overruled in the 1954 federal case Brown v. Board of Education, which found having separate facilities to be inherently unequal. Implementation of the Brown decision required enforcement of federal law over the objection of some local officials, especially in the Jim Crow South. The Brown decision clearly ended de jure discrimination—laws that required segregation—but residential settlement patterns and redlining meant that even in Boston, assigning students to their geographically closest school resulted in de facto segregation.

From its creation under the National Housing Act of 1934 signed into law by President Franklin D. Roosevelt, the Federal Housing Administration used its official mortgage insurance underwriting policy explicitly to prevent school integration. The Boston Housing Authority actively segregated the city's public housing developments since at least 1941 and continued to do so despite the passage of legislation by the 156th Massachusetts General Court prohibiting racial discrimination or segregation in housing in 1950 and the issuance of Executive Order 11063 by President John F. Kennedy in 1962 that required all federal agencies to prevent racial discrimination in federally-funded subsidized housing in the United States.

=== 1963 and 1964 ===
In 1963 and 1964, education activists staged boycotts to highlight the Boston School Committee's failure to address the de facto racial segregation of the city's public schools.

Black children's achievement levels were consistently lower than those of white children. Their dropout rates were higher, their schools were dilapidated, their textbooks were out-of-date, and their often demoralized teachers were more concerned with maintaining order than with teaching. In cities as large as Chicago, New York, Detroit, and Denver, and as small as Plainfield, New Jersey, and Stamford, Connecticut, black mothers mobilized to improve the quality of their children's education. They fought for integration via busing, mostly because they believed it was the best way to address the problem quickly. White children went to well-funded, well-equipped schools that were often underpopulated. Black mothers, such as those who organized Chicago's Truth Squad or Englewood, New Jersey's Englewood Movement, sought to place these “neighborhood schools” within the reach of black children. NAACP lawyers supported them, arguing that there was no difference between school segregation that occurred as a result of a legal mandate (de jure segregation) and that which occurred as a result of state-sanctioned real estate discrimination (de facto segregation). Both resulted in black deprivation. 32 Black education advocates met with stiff resistance from whites, also mostly mothers, who greeted black children with racial epithets. In a nationally televised address on June 6, 1963, President John F. Kennedy urged the nation to take action toward guaranteeing equal treatment of every American regardless of race. Soon after, Kennedy proposed that Congress consider civil rights legislation that would address voting rights, public accommodations, school desegregation, nondiscrimination in federally assisted programs, and more. Despite Kennedy's assassination in November 1963, his proposal culminated in the Civil Rights Act of 1964, signed into law by President Lyndon Johnson just a few hours after House approval on July 2, 1964. The act outlawed segregation in businesses such as theaters, restaurants, and hotels. It banned discriminatory practices in employment and ended segregation in public places such as swimming pools, libraries, and public schools. In Plainfield, after a 1964 state order to desegregate schools, black students found the words nigger steps and nigger entrance painted on parts of Plainfield High School.

=== Racial Imbalance Act ===
On April 1, 1965, a special committee appointed by Massachusetts Education Commissioner Owen Kiernan released its final report finding that more than half of black students enrolled in Boston Public Schools (BPS) attended institutions with enrollments that were at least 80 percent black and that housing segregation in the city had caused the racial imbalance.

In response to the report, on April 20, 1965, the Boston NAACP filed a lawsuit in federal district court against the city seeking the desegregation of the city's public schools. Massachusetts Governor John Volpe (1961–1963 & 1965–1969) filed a request for legislation from the state legislature that defined schools with nonwhite enrollments greater than 50 percent to be imbalanced and granted the State Board of Education the power to withhold state funds from any school district in the state that was found to have racial imbalance, which Volpe would sign into law the following August. Also in August 1965, Governor Volpe, Boston Mayor John F. Collins (1960–1968), and BPS Superintendent William H. Ohrenberger warned the Boston School Committee that a vote that they held that month to abandon a proposal to bus several hundred black students from Roxbury and North Dorchester from three overcrowded schools to nearby schools in Dorchester and Brighton, and purchase an abandoned Hebrew school in Dorchester to relieve the overcrowding instead, could now be held by a court to be deliberate acts of segregation. Pursuant to the Racial Imbalance Act, the state conducted a racial census and found 55 imbalanced schools in the state with 46 in Boston, and in October 1965, the State Board required the School Committee to submit a desegregation plan, which the School Committee did the following December.

The Racial Imbalance Act of 1965 is the legislation passed by the Massachusetts General Court which made the segregation of public schools illegal in Massachusetts. The law, the first of its kind in the United States, stated that "racial imbalance shall be deemed to exist when the percent of nonwhite students in any public school is in excess of fifty per cent of the total number of students in such school." These racially imbalanced schools were required to desegregate according to the law or risk losing their state educational funding. An initial report released in March 1965, "Because it is Right-Educationally," revealed that 55 schools in Massachusetts were racially imbalanced, 44 of which were in the City of Boston. The Boston School Committee was told that the complete integration of the Boston Public Schools needed to occur before September 1966 without the assurance of either significant financial aid or suburban cooperation in accepting African American students from Boston or the schools would lose funding.

In 1966, black parents and suburban allies formed the nonprofit METCO, which used the provisions of the Racial Imbalance Act to bring black students to suburban schools, but suburban students were not taken to black schools, thus desegregating suburban schools while leaving segregation within Boston largely unaffected. In the midst of the ongoing debate over Boston city schools, Jonathan Kozol's widely reported firing from an inner city school, against the wishes of black parents, intensified public debate over the quality of education being offered to black students.

=== Boston School Committee opposition to the Racial Imbalance Act ===
After the passage of the Racial Imbalance Act, the Boston School Committee, under the leadership of Louise Day Hicks, consistently disobeyed orders from the state Board of Education, first to develop a busing plan, and then to support its implementation. Hicks was adamant about her belief that this busing was not what communities and families wanted.

In April 1966, the State Board found the School Committee's plan to desegregate the Boston Public Schools in accordance with the Racial Imbalance Act of 1965 inadequate and voted to rescind state aid to the district, and in response, the School Committee filed a lawsuit against the State Board challenging both the decision and the constitutionality of the Racial Imbalance Act the following August. In January 1967, the Massachusetts Superior Court overturned a Suffolk Superior Court ruling that the State Board had improperly withdrawn the funds and ordered the School Committee to submit an acceptable plan to the State Board within 90 days or else permanently lose funding, which the School Committee did shortly thereafter and the State Board accepted. In June 1967, the Massachusetts Supreme Judicial Court upheld the constitutionality of the Racial Imbalance Act and the U.S. Supreme Court under Chief Justice Earl Warren (1953–1969) declined to hear the School Committee's appeal in January 1968. On May 25, 1971, the Massachusetts State Board of Education voted unanimously to withhold state aid from the Boston Public Schools due to the School Committee's refusal to use the district's open enrollment policy to relieve the city's racial imbalance in enrollments, instead routinely granting white students transfers while doing nothing to assist black students attempting to transfer.

On March 15, 1972, the Boston NAACP filed a lawsuit, later named Morgan v. Hennigan, against the Boston School Committee in federal district court. After being randomly assigned to the case, on June 21, 1974, Judge W. Arthur Garrity Jr. ruled that the open enrollment and controlled transfer policies that the School Committee created in 1961 and 1971 respectively were being used to effectively discriminate on the basis of race, and that the School Committee had maintained segregation in the Boston Public Schools by adding portable classrooms to overcrowded white schools instead of assigning white students to nearby underutilized black schools, while simultaneously purchasing closed white schools and busing black students past open white schools with vacant seats. In accordance with the Racial Imbalance Act, the School Committee would be required to bus 17,000 to 18,000 students the following September (Phase I) and to formulate a desegregation plan for the 1975–1976 school year by December 16 (Phase II). Twenty minutes after Judge Garrity's deadline for submitting the Phase II plan expired on December 16, 1974, the School Committee voted to reject the desegregation plan proposed by the department's Educational Planning Center. On December 18, Garrity summoned all five Boston School Committee members to court, held three of the members to be in contempt of court on December 27, and told the members on December 30 that he would purge their contempt holdings if they voted to authorize submission of a Phase II plan by January 7.

On January 7, 1975, the School Committee directed school department planners to file a voluntary-only busing proposal with the court. On May 10, the Massachusetts U.S. District Court announced a Phase II plan requiring 24,000 students to be bused that was formulated by a four-member committee consisting of former Massachusetts Supreme Judicial Court Justice Jacob Spiegel, former U.S. Education Commissioner Francis Keppel, Harvard Graduate School of Education professor Charles V. Willie, and former Massachusetts Attorney General Edward J. McCormack that was formed by Judge Garrity the previous February. On June 14, the U.S. Supreme Court under Chief Justice Warren E. Burger (1969–1986) unanimously declined to review the School Committee's appeal of the Phase II plan. In December 1975, Judge Garrity ordered South Boston High School put under federal receivership. In December 1982, Judge Garrity transferred responsibility for monitoring of compliance to the State Board for the subsequent two years, and in September 1985, Judge Garrity issued his final orders returning jurisdiction of the schools to the School Committee. In May 1990, Judge Garrity delivered his final judgment in Morgan v. Hennigan, formally closing the original case.

=== Development and implementation of busing ===
In 1972, the NAACP filed a class-action lawsuit (Morgan v. Hennigan with Tallulah Morgan as the main plaintiff) against the Boston School Committee on behalf of 14 parents and 44 children alleging segregation in the Boston public schools. Two years later, Judge W. Arthur Garrity Jr. of the United States District Court for the District of Massachusetts found a recurring pattern of racial discrimination in the operation of the Boston public schools in a 1974 ruling. His ruling found the schools were unconstitutionally segregated, and required the implementation of the state's Racial Imbalance Act, requiring any Boston school with a student enrollment that was more than 50% nonwhite to be balanced according to race.

As a remedy, Garrity used a busing plan developed by the Massachusetts State Board of Education, then oversaw its implementation for the next 13 years. Judge Garrity's ruling, upheld on appeal by the United States Court of Appeals for the First Circuit and by the Supreme Court led by Warren Burger, required school children to be brought to different schools to end segregation.

The busing plan affected the entire city, though the working-class neighborhoods of the racially divided city—whose children went predominantly to public schools—were most affected: the predominantly Irish-American neighborhoods of West Roxbury, Roslindale, Hyde Park, Charlestown, and South Boston and; the predominantly Italian-American North End neighborhood; the predominantly black neighborhoods of Roxbury, Mattapan, and the South End; and the mixed but segregated neighborhood of Dorchester.

In one part of the plan, Judge Garrity decided that the entire junior class from the mostly poor white South Boston High School would be bused to Roxbury High School, a black high school. Half the sophomores from each school would attend the other, and seniors could decide what school to attend. David Frum asserts that South Boston and Roxbury were "generally regarded as the two worst schools in Boston, and it was never clear what educational purpose was to be served by jumbling them." For three years after the plan commenced, Massachusetts state troopers were stationed at South Boston High. The first day of the plan, only 100 of 1,300 students came to school at South Boston. Only 13 of the 550 South Boston juniors ordered to attend Roxbury showed up. Parents showed up every day to protest, and football season was cancelled. Whites and blacks began entering through different doors. An anti-busing mass movement developed, called Restore Our Alienated Rights.

The final Judge Garrity-issued decision in Morgan v. Hennigan came in 1985, after which control of the desegregation plan was given to the School Committee in 1988.

== Impact ==
=== Political backlash and white flight ===
The integration plan aroused fierce criticism among some Boston residents. Republicans, who had initiated the program, withdrew support, and by the 1970s whites who could do so had either moved to suburban areas that were beyond the reach of desegregation orders or sent their children to private schools. Of the 100,000 enrolled in Boston school districts, attendance fell from 60,000 to 40,000 during these years. Opponents personally attacked Judge Garrity, claiming that because he lived in a white suburb, his own children were not affected by his ruling. The co-author of the busing plan, Robert Dentler, lived in the suburb of Lexington, which was unaffected by the ruling. Judge Garrity's hometown of Wellesley welcomed a small number of black students under the voluntary METCO program that sought to assist in desegregating the Boston schools by offering places in suburban school districts to black students, but students from Wellesley were not forced to attend school elsewhere. Senator Ted Kennedy was also criticized for supporting busing when he sent his own children to private schools.

=== Protests and violence ===
==== ROAR ====
Restore Our Alienated Rights (ROAR) was an anti-desegregation busing organization formed in Boston, Massachusetts by Boston School Committee chairwoman Louise Day Hicks in 1974. Using tactics modeled on the civil rights movement, ROAR activists led marches in Charlestown and South Boston, public prayers, sit-ins of school buildings and government offices, protests at the homes of prominent Bostonians, mock funerals, and even a small march on Washington DC. By 1976, with the failure to block implementation of the busing plan, the organization declined.

==== Violence ====
Hostile crowds gathered outside South Boston High School almost daily. In response to the violence, Judge Arthur Garrity, architect of the original Boston school desegregation plan, issued a judicial order in September 1975 that prohibited groups of three or more persons from gathering within 100 yards of the school.

From September 1974 through the fall of 1976, at least 40 riots occurred in the city. On September 12, 1974, 79 of 80 schools were bused without incident (with South Boston High School being the lone exception), and through October 10, there were 149 arrests (40 percent occurring at South Boston High alone), 129 injuries, and $50,000 in property damage. On October 15, an interracial stabbing at Hyde Park High School led to a riot that injured 8, and at South Boston High on December 11, a non-fatal interracial stabbing led to a riotous crowd of 1,800 to 2,500 whites hurling projectiles at police while white students fled the facility and black students remained. State Senator William Bulger, State Representative Raymond Flynn, and Boston City Councilor Louise Day Hicks made their way to the school, and Hicks spoke through a bullhorn to the crowd and urged them to allow the black students still in South Boston High to leave in peace, which they did, while the police made only 3 arrests, the injured numbered 25 (including 14 police), and the rioters badly damaged 6 police vehicles.

At Hyde Park High, on January 9, 1975, the second day back to school after the winter break, a fist fight in the first floor corridor erupted into a series of confrontations that spilled out into the streets of Hyde Park, causing police to rush to the scene. Police arrested 15 students, 13 of whom were black, and classes were suspended after the third period.

On February 12, 1975, interracial fighting broke out at Hyde Park High that would last for three days with police making 14 arrests, while no major disturbances occurred in March or April. On May 3, the Progressive Labor Party (PLP) organized an anti-racism march for unity and integration in South Boston, where dozens of racist attacks had already occurred. The PLP were attempting to march from Dorchester to South Boston to the home of Louise Day Hicks, a prominent leader of the antibusing cause. When the first group of PLP marchers arrived at Columbia Point, they were attacked by 20 to 30 South Boston youths with weapons, and the PLP marchers fought back against the segregationists. About 100 South Boston residents returned to the parade route with baseball bats, hockey sticks, and rocks in an attempt to disrupt the march. The full contingent of 2500 PLP marchers was then attacked by over 1,000 stone-throwing South Boston residents. The police made 8 arrests (including 3 people from New York City) and the injured numbered 10. The PLP riot sparked another melee at Hyde Park High School that lasted for two days on May 7 and 8. On May 9, an angry crowd at South Boston High threatened to throw projectiles at black students attempting to exit the school. From June 10 through July 7, police made no arrests in more than a dozen of what they described as "racial incidents."

On July 27, 1975, a group of black bible salesmen from South Carolina went swimming on Carson Beach. In response, hundreds of white male and female bathers gathered with pipes and sticks and chased the bible salesmen from the beach on foot, with the mob destroying their car and the police making two arrests. The following Sunday, August 3, a taxicab with a black driver and three Hispanic passengers was subjected to projectiles from passersby as it drove past the beach. In response, on August 10, black community leaders organized a protest march and picnic at the beach where 800 police and a crowd of whites from South Boston were on hand. 2,000 blacks and 4,000 whites fought and lobbed projectiles at each other for over 2 hours until police closed the beach after 40 injuries and 10 arrests.

On September 8, 1975, the first day of school, while there was only one school bus stoning from Roxbury to South Boston, citywide attendance was only 58.6%. In Charlestown (where only 314 of 883 students, or 35.6% attended Charlestown High School), gangs of youths roamed the streets, hurling projectiles at police, overturning cars, setting trash cans on fire, and stoning firemen. 75 youths stormed Bunker Hill Community College after classes ended and assaulted a black student in the lobby, while 300 youths marched up Breed's Hill, overturning and burning cars. On October 24, 15 students at South Boston High were arrested.

On January 21, 1976, 1,300 black and white students fought each other at Hyde Park High. At South Boston High on February 15, anti-busing activists organized marches under a parade permit from the Andrew Square and Broadway MBTA Red Line stations which would meet and end at South Boston High. After confusion between the marchers and the police about the parade route led the marchers to attempt to walk through a police line, the marchers began throwing projectiles at the police. The marchers regrouped and migrated to South Boston High, where approximately 1,000 demonstrators engaged with police in a full riot that required the police to employ tear gas. 80 police officers were injured and 13 rioters were arrested.

On April 19, 1976, black youths in Roxbury assaulted a white motorist and beat him comatose, while numerous car stonings occurred through April. On April 28, a bomb threat at Hyde Park High emptied the building and resulted in a melee between black and white students that required police action to end. On the evening of September 7, the night before the first day of school, white youths in Charlestown threw projectiles at police and injured 2 U.S. Marshals, a crowd in South Boston stoned an MBTA bus with a black driver, and the next day, youths in Hyde Park, Roxbury, and Dorchester stoned buses transporting outside students in. Incidents of interracial violence in Boston would continue from November 1977 through at least 1993.

Many protest incidents turned severely violent, even resulting in deaths. On April 5, 1976, Ted Landsmark, a black lawyer and executive director of the Boston Contractors' Association, was on his way to a meeting at City Hall when he was intercepted by a delegation of white South Boston and Charlestown High students who were leaving the city council chamber after having aired their views on busing. As Landmark crossed through the plaza, he was accosted by the marchers, who struck him several times on the side and back. His assault by a white teenager Joseph Rakes with the staff of a flagpole bearing the American flag was famously depicted in a 1977 Pulitzer Prize-winning photograph, The Soiling of Old Glory published in the Boston Herald American by photojournalist Stanley Forman. In a retaliatory incident about two weeks later, black teenagers in Roxbury threw rocks at auto mechanic Richard Poleet's car and caused him to crash. The youths dragged him out and crushed his skull with nearby paving stones. When police arrived, the man was surrounded by a crowd of 100 chanting "Let him die" while lying in a coma from which he never recovered.

In another instance, a White teenager was nearly stabbed to death by a Black teenager at South Boston High School. The community's White residents mobbed the school, trapping the Black students inside. There were dozens of other racial incidents at South Boston High that year, predominantly of racial taunting of the Black students. The school closed for a month after the stabbing. When it opened again, it was one of the first high schools to install metal detectors; with 400 students attending, it was guarded by 500 police officers every day. In December 1975, Judge Garrity removed the principal of South Boston High and assumed control himself.

Judge Garrity reduced the plan to first grade for the following school year. In October 1975, 6,000 marched against the busing in South Boston.

The debut of the TV series Welcome Back, Kotter initially did not air in Boston as WCVB-TV feared the show's setting of an urban high school with diverse characters would only lead to further unrest. However, as it became popular in the rest of the United States, WCVB would include the sitcom in its lineup.

==== Ted Kennedy speech ====
Senator Ted Kennedy was giving a speech. Kennedy's speech was interrupted by a rowdy antibusing delegation that peppered the senator with insults, jeers, and name calling. Kennedy was chased to his car which had already been vandalized. Kennedy was whisked away by police to a train station where a crowd hurled stones at the departing train.

=== Impact on Boston Public Schools ===
In 1987, a federal appeals court ruled that Boston had successfully implemented its desegregation plan and was in compliance with civil rights law. Although 13 public schools were defined as "racially identifiable," with over 80 percent of the student population either White or Black, the court ruled "all these schools are in compliance with the district court's desegregation orders" because their make-up "is rooted not in discrimination but in more intractable demographic obstacles."

Before the desegregation plan went into effect, overall enrollment and white enrollment in Boston Public Schools was in decline as the Baby Boom ended, gentrification altered the economic makeup of the city, and Jewish, Irish and Italian immigrant populations moved to the suburbs while black, Hispanic, and Asian populations moved to the city. Although the busing plan, by its very nature, shaped the enrollment at specific schools, it is unclear what effect it had on underlying demographic trends. By the time the court-controlled busing system ended in 1988, the Boston school district had shrunk from 93,000 students to 57,000, only 15% of whom were white.

== End of racial desegregation policy ==
In 1983, oversight of the desegregation system was shifted from Garrity to the Massachusetts Board of Education. With his final ruling in 1985, Garrity began transfer of control of the desegregation system to the Boston School Committee. After a federal appeals court ruled in September 1987 that Boston's desegregation plan was successful, the Boston School Committee took full control of the plan in 1988. In November 1998, a federal appeals court struck down racial preference guidelines for assignment at Boston Latin School, the most prestigious school in the system, the result of a lawsuit filed in 1995 by a white parent whose daughter was denied admission. On July 15, 1999, the Boston School Committee voted to drop racial make-up guidelines from its assignment plan for the entire system, but the busing system continued.

In 2013, the busing system was replaced by one which dramatically reduced busing. Beginning with school year 2014, they switched to a new policy that gives each family preference for schools near their home, while still ensuring that all students have access to quality high schools.

The voluntary METCO program, which was established in 1966, remains in operation, as do other inter-district school choice programs.

== Legacy ==
Crime novelist Dennis Lehane's 2023 novel Small Mercies uses the forced busing of Boston schoolchildren in 1974 as a backdrop to its plot.

Forced integration was the subject of the documentary film The Busing Battleground which was directed by Sharon Grimberg and Cyndee Readdean and first aired on American Experience on September 11, 2023.

== See also ==
- Wendell Arthur Garrity Jr., judge who ordered desegregation
- Kathleen Sullivan Alioto, School committee chair and member
- John J. Kerrigan, School Committee Chair and member
- Ruth Batson, in her work with the Boston Branch of the NAACP, spearheaded the effort for school desegregation in Boston.
- Jean McGuire, executive director of the Metropolitan Council for Educational Opportunity (METCO, Inc.) and the first female African American to gain a seat on the Boston School Committee at Large right after the Boston busing desegregation
- Kevin White (mayor), United States politician best known as the Mayor of Boston, during the late 1960s and the 1970s. White won the mayoral office in the 1967 general election in a hard-fought campaign opposing the anti-busing and anti-desegregation Boston School Committee member Louise Day Hicks.
- Louise Day Hicks, an American politician and lawyer from Boston, Massachusetts, best known for her staunch opposition to desegregation in Boston Public Schools, and especially to court-ordered busing in the 1960s and 1970s
- Joe Moakley, a Democratic congressman from the Ninth District of Massachusetts. He won the seat from incumbent Louise Day Hicks in a 1972 rematch.
- South Boston High School was the site of many of the most vocal and violent protests of busing and desegregation. As a result of these protests, the school's community became unsafe for students; a federal court placed the school into receivership in December 1975.
- The Combahee River Collective, a Black lesbian feminist organization based across the river in Cambridge, included members who worked on school desegregation in Boston.
- Citywide Educational Coalition played an important role in the desegregation of the Boston Public Schools and advocated for school reform by providing parents with the skills necessary to participate in shaping education policy.
- List of incidents of civil unrest in the United States

== See also ==
- Education in Massachusetts
