= James A. Parker (foreign service officer) =

American diplomat (1922–1994)

James A. Parker (April 30, 1922 – August 21, 1994) was an African-American Foreign Service Officer for the United States Department of State. In 1963, while at Boston University, he won a housing discrimination lawsuit in Lexington, Massachusetts.

He was born in Baltimore, Maryland, to Roxie and William Parker. After serving in World War II as a U.S. Army sergeant, he earned a bachelor's degree in public administration from American University. In 1947, Parker became a career Foreign Service Officer, serving in Liberia, Nigeria, and Spain. On a year's leave, he enrolled in the African Studies Program at Boston University. While there, he sought to rent a house in Lexington, but was rebuffed by the owner Mark Moore, Jr. His lawsuit led to a protest on the Lexington Battle Green.

Parker later served in Douala and Yaoundé, Cameroon, where he was consul general and later deputy chief of mission. His last overseas assignment was in La Paz, Bolivia, where he was again deputy chief of mission and chargé d'affaires. He also served as desk officer for Central Africa.

== See also ==
- Civil Rights Movement
