= Hiwaga ng Pag-ibig =

Filipino novel

Hiwaga ng Pag-ibig ("Mystery of Love") is a 1912 Tagalog-language novel written by Filipino novelist Mamerto A. Hilario. The romance novel was published in Manila, Philippines by Limbagang Magiting ni Honorio Lopez (Heroic Printing Press of Honorio Lopez).

== See also ==
- Pag-ibig at Kamatayan
