= The World of Abnormal Psychology =

- Genre: Educational
- Created by: Dr. Philip Zimbardo
- Presented by: Dr. Philip Zimbardo
- Starring: Dr. Philip Zimbardo
- Narrated by: Dr. Philip Zimbardo
- Country of origin: United States
- Original language: English
- No. of seasons: 1
- No. of episodes: 13

Production
- Running time: 60 minutes
- Production companies: Alvin H. Perlmutter and Toby Levine Communications

Original release
- Network: PBS
- Release: 1992

Related
- Discovering Psychology

The World of Abnormal Psychology is an educational video series produced by Annenberg Media, which examines behavioral disorders in humans. The series was hosted by Dr. Philip Zimbardo of Stanford University, who was best known for his controversial Stanford prison experiment.

== Overview ==
This series builds on Zimbardo's first series Discovering Psychology and is often shown on PBS stations in the United States. The series has been used in courses at seminaries, and as a resource for teachers. The American Psychological Association lists the series under Education and Psychology.

== Episodes ==
The series has 13 episodes, each focusing on a different area of abnormal behavior.

No. overall	No. in season	Title	Original release date
1	1	"Looking at Abnormal Behavior"	1992
Demonstrates The Minnesota Multiphasic Personality Inventory-2 (MMPI-2) test, as well as: The Bender-Gestalt Test, The Trail Making Test, The Wechsler Adult Intelligence Scale, The Thematic Apperception Test, and The Lafayette Grooved Pegboard Test Gives a brief overview of three Models for understanding behavior – Biological, Psychodynamic, Cognitive-Behavioral Features These doctors from Jackson Memorial Medical Center: Carl Eisdorfer, Ph.D., M.D.; Bernard S. Brucker, Ph.D.; Antonio Gines, M.D.; Rafael Conte, M.D.; Debra Katz, M.D.; Mercedes Gonzalez-Blanco, M.D.; Jay M. Weinstein, Ph.D.; Eddie E. Roca, Ph.D.; Features these doctors and medical social workers as well: James N. Butcher, Ph.D. – University of Minnesota; Gayla Blackwell, R.N., M.S.W. – L.A. Veterans Admin.; Edward S. Katkin, Ph. D. – State University of New York – Stony Brook
2	2	"The Nature of Stress"	1992
Examines the effects of stress on human behavior. Gives Brief overview of Post-traumatic stress disorder Features: Norman Anderson, Ph.D. – Duke University; Andrew Baum, Ph.D. – Department of Defense Medical School; Ann Smolin, C.S.W. – Psychotherapist; Andrew E. Slaby, M.D. – Regent Hospital; Theodore Beyda – Accountant; Lisa Marie Dias – Architect; Antoinette Warren; Suzie Sawyer – Founder C.O.P.S. - Concerns of Police Survivors; Peter Kollisch; Mardi J. Horowitz, M.D. – University of California; Dean Kilpatrick, Ph.D. – Crime Victims Research Center; Connie Best, Ph.D. – Crime Victims Research Center;Steve Bentley – Vietnam Veterans of America
3	3	"The Anxiety Disorders"	1992
This episode looks at anxiety disorders. Gives brief overview of: Panic Disorder, Agoraphobia,Generalized anxiety disorder, Obsessive–compulsive disorder, Hypochondriasis Features: Freda C. Lewis-Hall, M.D. – Howard University ;Dennis G. Shulman, Ph.D.; Dianne Chambless, Ph.D. – American University; Alan Goldstein, Ph.D. – Agoraphobia and Anxiety Treatment Center; Christina D. Donnell, Ph.D. – St. Paul Ramsey Medical Center; Teresa Quinn, M.D.;
4	4	"Psychological Factors and Physical Illness"	1992
The program investigates how health is affected by emotions. Addresses issues with: Coronary Heart Disease, Migraine Headaches, and Breast cancer Features: Edward S. Katkin, Ph. D. – State University of New York – Stony Brook Marian Limacher, M.D. – University of Florida Medical Center Nancy Norvell, Ph.D. Guillermo Argueta-Bernal, Ph.D. Joan Borysenko, Ph.D. Janice Kiecolt-Glaser, Ph.D. Ronald Glaser, Ph.D. Robert Hoffman, Ph.D. Leonne Schillo-Coady, RN, MN
5	5	"Personality Disorders"	1992
This episode examines anti-social behavior and other personality disorders.
6	6	"Substance Abuse Disorders"	1992
Research into alcohol and drug abuse.
7	7	"Sexual Disorders"	1992
This program analyzes various sexual disorders and their treatments.
8	8	"Mood Disorders"	1992
The program observes the problems and treatments for bipolar disorder.
9	9	"The Schizophrenias"	1992
Examines paranoia and other schizophrenias.
10	10	"Organic Mental Disorders"	1992
Determines how the brain is affected by physical problems.
11	11	"Behavior Disorders of Childhood"	1992
Investigates problems in childhood, such as conduct disorders, that can become issues later in life.
12	12	"Psychotherapies"	1992
Various therapies for dealing with mental problems.
13	13	"An Ounce of Prevention"	1992
The final episode in the series shows how people with disorders can overcome their problems with the right therapies.

== Publications ==
- The World of Abnormal Psychology, videotape (VHS (13 ea.), 60 minutes per episode, 1991–92), Annenberg/CPB Project, ISBN 9781559466790 OCLC 27423584
- The World of Abnormal Psychology: Study Guide, book (3rd ed., 1999), Allyn & Bacon, ISBN 9780321059239 OCLC 44696105
- The World of Abnormal Psychology: Faculty Guide, book (2nd ed., 1996), HarperCollins Publishers, ISBN 9780673974839 OCLC 35005257
- Abnormal Psychology and Modern Life, book (9th ed., 1992), HarperCollins Publishers, ISBN 9780673464880 OCLC 24214770
