= J. Anthony Lukas =

American journalist and author

Jay Anthony Lukas
- Born: April 25, 1933; New York City, U.S.
- Died: June 5, 1997 (aged 64); New York City, U.S.
- Education: Harvard University (BA); Free University of Berlin
- Occupations: Journalist, author
- Spouse: Linda Healey
- Relatives: Christopher Lukas (brother); Paul Lukas (uncle)
- Writing career
- Notable work: Common Ground (1985)

Jay Anthony Lukas (April 25, 1933 – June 5, 1997) was an American journalist and author, best known for his 1985 book Common Ground: A Turbulent Decade in the Lives of Three American Families. Common Ground is a study of race relations, class conflict, and school busing in Boston, Massachusetts, as seen through the eyes of three families: one upper-middle-class white, one working-class white, and one working-class African-American. His work garnered him two Pulitzer Prizes.

== Early life and education ==
J. Anthony Lukas was born to Elizabeth and Edwin Lukas in White Plains, New York. His mother was an actress and his uncle Paul Lukas was an Academy Award–winning actor. Lukas at first wanted to be an actor. After his mother committed suicide and his father's illness after her death, he was at the age of eight enrolled in the coeducational Putney School in Vermont. His younger brother, Christopher Lukas, born in 1935, is a television producer and writer.

Lukas attended Harvard University, where he worked at the Harvard Crimson and graduated magna cum laude in 1955. He continued his education at the Free University of Berlin as an Adenauer Fellow. Thereafter, he served in the United States Army in Japan, where he wrote commentaries for the Voice of the United Nations Command (VUNC).

== Career ==
Lukas began his professional journalism career at The Baltimore Sun and then moved to The New York Times. He stayed at the Times for nine years, working as a roving reporter, and serving at the Washington, D.C., New York City, and United Nations bureaus, and overseas in Ceylon, India, Japan, Pakistan, South Africa and Zaire. After working at The New York Times Magazine as a staff writer and freelancer for a short time in the 1970s (where he notably covered the Watergate scandal in two issue-length articles that served as the basis for a 1976 book, Nightmare: The Underside of the Nixon Years, and even correctly guessed that Deep Throat, the secret informant who provided information on the scandal to Bob Woodward, was Mark Felt), Lukas quit reporting to pursue a career in book and magazine writing, becoming known for writing intensely researched nonfiction works. He was a contributor to The Atlantic Monthly, the Columbia Journalism Review, Esquire, Harper's Magazine, The Nation, The New Republic, and the Saturday Review. Additionally, he was the co-founder and editor of MORE, a "critical journal" on the news media which folded in 1978, and a "contributing editor to the New Times, an alternative magazine that also folded in 1978."

== Death ==
Lukas was diagnosed with depression in the late 1980s. In an interview that followed the publication of Common Ground in 1985, he had given some hints about his frame of mind, linking it with his career as a writer:

All writers are, to one extent or another, damaged people. Writing is our way of repairing ourselves. In my own case, I was filling a hole in my life which opened at the age of eight, when my mother killed herself, throwing our family into utter disarray. My father quickly developed tuberculosis – psychosomatically triggered, the doctors thought – forcing him to seek treatment in an Arizona sanatorium. We sold our house and my brother and I were shipped off to boarding school. Effectively, from the age of eight, I had no family, and certainly no community. That's one reason the book worked: I wasn't just writing a book about busing. I was filling a hole in myself.

In 1997, Lukas' book, Big Trouble: A Murder in a Small Western Town Sets Off a Struggle for the Soul of America, was undergoing final revisions. Lukas committed suicide on June 5. The suicide occurred in his apartment on the Upper West Side of Manhattan. He was survived by his wife, book editor Linda Healey.

== Awards ==
Lukas won his first Pulitzer Prize in 1968 for "The Two Worlds of Linda Fitzpatrick" in the now-defunct award category of Local Investigative Specialized Reporting. The New York Times article documented the life of a teenager from a wealthy, Greenwich, Connecticut-based family who became involved in drugs and the hippie movement before being bludgeoned to death in the basement of an East Village tenement. Lukas was previously awarded a George Polk Award in Local Reporting in 1967 for the story.

Almost twenty years later, he received the Pulitzer Prize for General Nonfiction for Common Ground, as well as the U.S. National Book Award for Nonfiction, the National Book Critics Award, the 1985-1986 Robert F. Kennedy Center for Justice and Human Rights Book Award and the Political Book of the Year Award.

The Lukas Prize Project, co-administered by the Columbia University's Graduate School of Journalism and the Nieman Foundation at Harvard, supports the work of American nonfiction writers. It hosts conferences and presents three annual awards: the J. Anthony Lukas Book Prize, the Mark Lynton History Prize, and the J. Anthony Lukas Work-in-Progress Award.

== Selected publications ==
- "The Two Worlds of Linda Fitzpatrick", 1967, The New York Times article on the life and death of a teenager in the 1960s counterculture — winner of the Pulitzer Prize
- "The Barnyard Epithet and Other Obscenities: Notes on the Chicago Conspiracy Trial", 1970, a story on the Chicago Seven, aka the Chicago Eight
- Don't Shoot, We Are Your Children!, 1971, a collection of stories about members of the 1960s counterculture (including the Linda Fitzpatrick article). A section by Kai Erikson —sociologist and professor of American studies at Yale and editor of The Yale Review— challenged the view that there was a "generation gap" between the sixties generation and their parents generations, arguing that the sixties generation expressed overtly what previous generations had expressed covertly.
- "After the Pentagon Papers–A Month in the New Life of Daniel Ellsberg", 1971, The New York Times story on Ellsberg's meetings with various anti-Vietnam War activists, motivations behind leaking the Papers, and friendships with Harry Rowen and Tony Russo.
- Nightmare: The Underside of the Nixon Years, 1976, a book on Richard Nixon and the Watergate scandal, originating in two long, detailed issue-length articles on Watergate for The New York Times Sunday Magazine, and a third underway but canceled when Nixon resigned. Lukas completed work on the third article and used it as the final section of the book. In the book, Lukas correctly guesses that Mark Felt was Deep Throat.
- Common Ground: A Turbulent Decade in the Lives of Three American Families, 1985, a book on busing and school desegregation in Boston and three families and their histories.
- Big Trouble, 1997, a posthumously published history of a struggle between unions and mining company officials and supporters in Idaho, early in the twentieth century, after the bombing assassination of former Idaho governor Frank Steunenberg.
