= John D. O'Bryant =

African American educator (1931–1992)

John Donaldson O'Bryant (July 15, 1931 – July 3, 1992) was the first African American to be elected to the Boston School Committee, being elected in 1977.

He spent most of his adult life working in the school systems, first as a school teacher and ending with work at Northeastern University until his death in 1992. O'Bryant was born in Boston, Massachusetts. He also served in the United States Army before he began his teaching career.

The John D. O'Bryant School of Mathematics & Science in Boston is named after him, as is the John D. O'Bryant Center for African American Studies at Northeastern University.

== Early life and education ==
O'Bryant was born in Boston, Massachusetts, on July 15, 1931. He was born to David D. O'Bryant and Elsie (Donaldson) O'Bryant Joseph. He was the youngest of five children. His father David died when he was young and was raised by his mother, Elsie, and stepfather George E. Joseph. O'Bryant attended the Boston Public Schools and graduated from The English High School in 1948.

After high school, he attended Boston University, in Boston, Massachusetts, where he also played basketball. He played basketball through his undergraduate and captained the team at Boston University and received a bachelor's degree in Education in 1952.

He continued his education and received a master's degree in health education in 1955. While obtaining his masters, O'Bryant served in the United States Army from 1952 until 1954, where he worked as an information and education instructor

== Career ==
After exiting the Army, O'Bryant became a teacher in 1955 for the Boston Public Schools. He was also a guidance counselor at Boston Technical High School until 1969. He wanted to be a head basketball coach in the Boston schools, but racial attitudes of the 1960s prohibited this.

O'Bryant left his position as a guidance counselor in 1969 to transition into a director role for the Health Vocational Training Program at the Dimock Community Health Center based in Roxbury, Massachusetts. He directed paramedical training programs for students in all areas of Boston. He held this position from 1969 to 1978 before taking on his role at Northeastern University.

During O'Bryant's first year at Northeastern in 1978, he was the Associate Dean of Administration before becoming the vice president of student affairs. In 1979 Kenneth G. Ryder, president of Northeastern, appointed O'Bryant as Vice President of Student Affairs. The two had met while serving on the Citywide Coordinating Council. O'Bryant helped welcome more African Americans to the Northeastern community.

=== Boston School Committee ===
In 1977, O'Bryant became the first African American to be elected to the Boston School Committee in 75 years. While he was the president of the school committee he was also serving as the national chairman of the Council of Urban School Boards of Education of the National School Boards Association. Before running for the school committee, he helped run the campaign for Mel King in 1959 and 1961. King suggested O'Bryant run for the committee in upcoming races because of his ideas and opinions.
