= Ruth Batson =

American civil rights activist

Ruth Marion Batson (née Watson; 1921–2003) was an American civil rights activist and outspoken advocate of equal education. She spoke out about the desegregation of Boston Public Schools. She served as Chairman of the Public Education Sub-Committee of the National Association for the Advancement of Colored People (NAACP) in 1953. Later, she served as the executive director of the Metropolitan Council for Educational Opportunity (METCO).

== Biography ==
Ruth Marion Watson was born August 3, 1921, in Roxbury, Massachusetts, to Jamaican immigrants, Joel R. Watson and Cassandra D. Buchanan. She attended the Everett School in Dorchester, Massachusetts. Batson graduated from the Girls Latin School in 1939.

She attended the Nursery Training School of Boston, which was associated with Boston University. She later received a Master of Education degree from Boston University in 1976.

== Career ==
Inspired by her mother's interest in civil rights, Batson became the chairman of the Public Education Sub-Committee of the National Association for the Advancement of Colored People (NAACP) in 1953. In April 1957, she became the chairwoman of the New England Regional Conference of the NAACP, where she worked as a civil rights lobbyist.

In the early 1960s, she challenged the Boston School Committee, charging that Boston Public Schools were largely segregated. Batson highlighted that schools with majority black student populations often had poor quality facilities when compared to the facilities at schools with majority white student enrollment. She accused school administrators with ignoring "a basic American concept that equal opportunity should be available to all people regardless of race, color, or creed."

Batson was the first black woman on the Democratic National Committee and the first woman elected president of the NAACP's New England Regional Conference, serving from 1957 to 1960.

After serving as chairwoman of the Massachusetts Commission Against Discrimination from 1963 to 1966, she helped launched the Metropolitan Council for Educational Opportunity (METCO) voluntary desegregation program. As associate director, then director, she helped guide METCO's growth from transporting 225 black urban children to several suburbs, to 1,125 children to 28 communities. She stepped down in 1969.

She served in several roles at Boston University: director of the consultation and education program (1970–1975), director of the school desegregation research project (1975–1981), coordinator of the clinical task force, and associate professor at the School of Medicine's Division of Psychiatry.

== Marriage ==
In 1941, aged 19, Watson married John C. Batson. They had three daughters together: Cassandra Way, Susan Batson, and Dorothy Owusu. John C. Batson died in 1971.

== Death ==
Ruth Batson died on October 28, 2003, at the age of 82. She died in her sleep at her Beacon Hill home.

== Honors and awards ==
In 1989 Batson received an honorary Doctorate of Pedagogy from Northeastern University. In 1993, she received an honorary degree from the University of Massachusetts Boston.

She was a member of the board of visitors of Boston University's School of Medicine; trustees, Boston City Hospital; member, Corporation of the Massachusetts General Hospital and former member of its board of trustees; and board member of Roxbury Community College Foundation.

== Publications ==
She was the author of The Black Educational Movement in Boston: A Sequence of Historical Events (1638–1975), a comprehensive chronology documenting the heroic efforts and contributions of African American parents to educational history in Boston. Northeastern University's School of Education has made the manuscript available online.

== Philanthropy ==
She was the founder in 1969 of the Ruth M. Batson Educational Foundation, which provided grants to African American college students for tuition and emergency needs. The Batson Foundation also awards grants to educational institutions and community organizations whose program objectives reflect the philosophy of the Batson Foundation.

More recently, Batson had directed the revitalized Museum of African American History in Beacon Hill, stepping down in 1990.

Her financial support for medical students at Boston University School of Medicine, the school, under the leadership of Dr. Aram Chobanian, established the Ruth Batson Scholarship in 1997. Since that time, the school has awarded more than US$500,000 in scholarships to 40 Boston University minority medical students, including four MD and PhD students. Each year, Batson visited the medical center to have lunch with the Batson Scholars, hear their life's stories and share her experiences, especially with the health care system in America.
