= W. Arthur Garrity Jr. =

American judge (1920–1999)

- Official portrait, 1994

Senior Judge of the United States District Court for the District of Massachusetts
- In office December 1, 1985 – September 16, 1999

Judge of the United States District Court for the District of Massachusetts
- In office June 24, 1966 – December 1, 1985
- Appointed by: Lyndon B. Johnson
- Preceded by: Seat established by 75 Stat. 80
- Succeeded by: Douglas P. Woodlock

United States Attorney for the District of Massachusetts
- In office 1961–1966
- Appointed by: John F. Kennedy
- Preceded by: Elliot Richardson
- Succeeded by: Paul F. Markham

Personal details
- Born: Wendell Arthur Garrity Jr. June 20, 1920 Worcester, Massachusetts, U.S.
- Died: September 16, 1999 (aged 79) Wellesley, Massachusetts, U.S.
- Education: College of the Holy Cross (BA); Harvard University (LLB)

Military service
- Branch/service: United States Army; Signal Corps
- Years of service: 1943–1945
- Rank: Sergeant

Wendell Arthur Garrity Jr. (June 20, 1920 – September 16, 1999) was an American jurist who served as a federal district judge on the U.S. District Court for the District of Massachusetts from 1966 to 1999. He was best known for issuing the 1974 order in Morgan v. Hennigan which mandated that Boston schools be desegregated by means of busing.

== Early life and education ==
Garrity was born on June 20, 1920, in Worcester, Massachusetts. He was the son of W. Arthur Garrity Sr. and Mary B. (Kennedy) Garrity, and was named after Boston abolitionist Wendell Phillips. His father, Garrity Sr., was a prominent lawyer in Worcester who was descended from Irish Catholic immigrants and was a member of the NAACP. The elder Garrity also served as a member of the Worcester School Committee.

Garrity attended North High School, where he became the president of the student council and a leading member of its debate team. He then graduated from the College of the Holy Cross with a Bachelor of Arts, cum laude, in 1941. As an undergraduate at Holy Cross, he was remembered by classmates for being "a brilliant 'forensicator'" and wrote a senior thesis titled, Federal Licensing of Corporations. Afterwards, he enrolled at Harvard Law School but withdrew in his second year in order to join the United States Army, where, despite being nearsighted, he served as a sergeant in the U.S. Signal Corps, from 1943 to 1945.

During World War II, Garrity was present at the Normandy landings and was awarded five service stars for combat distinction in France and Germany. He then returned to the U.S. and earned his Bachelor of Laws (LL.B.) from Harvard Law School in 1946. As a third-year law student at Harvard, he was a member of the Williston Law Club, one of the law school's historic moot court organizations.

== Private practice and U.S. attorney, 1946–1966 ==
After graduating from Harvard, Garrity served as a law clerk to Judge Francis J. W. Ford of the United States District Court for the District of Massachusetts from 1946 to 1947. He entered private practice in Boston and Worcester in 1947, before becoming an Assistant United States Attorney for the District of Massachusetts in 1948, a position he held until 1950. From 1950 to 1951, Garrity lectured on federal jurisdiction and procedure at Boston College Law School, after which he returned to private practice in Boston until 1961. During his time in private practice, Garrity represented clients ranging from corporations to mafia figures.

By 1966, Garrity had tried cases in the Massachusetts district, superior, and probate courts, as well as the U.S. District Court and the U.S. Tax Court, and had argued appeals before state and federal appellate courts, including the U.S. Supreme Court. He had also served as a master in Massachusetts and federal district court proceedings and as a receiver and trustee in bankruptcy proceedings and corporate reorganizations.

During his years in private practice, Garrity became involved in the political campaigns of John F. Kennedy. During Kennedy's 1952 campaign for the U.S. Senate, Garrity served on a speakers bureau and acted as the campaign's "Wellesley Kennedy secretary", organizing a small group of supporters to distribute campaign materials in Wellesley, Massachusetts. During Kennedy's campaign for the 1960 Democratic presidential nomination, Garrity spent six or seven weeks in Wisconsin as the person in charge of the campaign's state headquarters, where he oversaw the distribution of campaign materials and other headquarters operations. Before the 1960 Democratic National Convention, Garrity also worked in Kennedy's Washington campaign headquarters compiling state election laws and voter-registration materials, and after Kennedy's nomination he addressed meetings of Democratic state chairmen in Los Angeles concerning the project.

Garrity served as United States Attorney for the District of Massachusetts from 1961 to 1966. He had not sought the appointment and had not personally discussed it with either President Kennedy or Attorney General Robert F. Kennedy before later learning indirectly that he was being considered for the position. During his tenure, the Boston U.S. Attorney's office participated in the Justice Department's program directed against organized crime. He recalled that Robert Kennedy took a personal interest in the investigation of the Plymouth Mail robbery, traveling to Boston to meet with Garrity and the postal inspectors working on the case and to examine evidence gathered in the investigation.

== Federal judicial service ==
Garrity was nominated by President Lyndon B. Johnson on May 23, 1966, to the United States District Court for the District of Massachusetts, to a new seat authorized by 75 Stat. 80. He was confirmed by the United States Senate on June 24, 1966, and received his commission on June 24, 1966. He assumed senior status on December 1, 1985. His service terminated on September 16, 1999, due to his death from cancer in Wellesley, Massachusetts.

== Boston school busing case ==
As a federal judge, Garrity was at the center of a contentious battle over desegregation busing in Boston from the 1970s to the 1980s. He found a recurring pattern of racial discrimination in the operation of the Boston public schools in a 1974 ruling. His ruling found the schools were unconstitutionally segregated.

As a remedy, he used a busing plan developed by the Massachusetts State Board of Education to implement the state's Racial Imbalance Law that had been passed by the Massachusetts state legislature a few years earlier, requiring any school with a student enrollment that was more than 50% nonwhite to be balanced according to race. The Boston School Committee consistently disobeyed orders from the state Board of Education. Garrity's ruling, upheld on appeal by conservative judges on the United States Court of Appeals for the First Circuit and by the Supreme Court led by Warren Burger, required school children to be brought to different schools to end segregation and led to the Boston busing crisis of 1974-88. By the final Garrity-decided court case in 1988, Garrity had assumed more control over a school system than any judge in American history.

An obituary in the New York Times noted that

Opposition to desegregation exploded in some areas, particularly the largely Irish Catholic enclaves of Charlestown and South Boston, and spilled over into racial violence. Garrity became the target of death threats and at least two attempts on his life. He remained under guard 24 hours a day from 1974-78. He was scorned and snubbed by many; his name appeared in profane city graffiti; he was hanged in effigy, and demonstrators came to his home.

== Personal life and family ==
Garrity married Barbara A. Mullins in 1952, and they had four children together, all of whom attended either the College of the Holy Cross or the University of Notre Dame. He also had a brother, John T. Garrity, a managing director at McKinsey & Company.

== See also ==
- Desegregation busing in the United States § Boston, Massachusetts

== Sources ==
- Formisano, Ronald P. (1991). Boston Against Busing: Race, Class, and Ethnicity in the 1960s and 1970s. Chapel Hill: University of North Carolina Press. ISBN 978-0-8078-1929-6.

Legal offices
Preceded by Seat established by 75 Stat. 80	Judge of the United States District Court for the District of Massachusetts; 1966–1985	Succeeded by Douglas P. Woodlock
