= Paul J. Ellison =

American politician

Member of the Boston School Committee
- In office 1972–1976
- Preceded by: Joseph Lee/John J. Craven Jr.^{1}
- Succeeded by: Elvira "Pixie" Palladino

Personal details
- Born: July 17, 1940 Boston
- Died: January 20, 1988 (aged 47) Boston
- Party: Democratic

Paul J. Ellison (July 17, 1940 – January 20, 1988) was an American politician who served on the Boston School Committee from 1972 to 1976. In 1976, he was convicted of larceny for endorsing and cashing checks made out to his assistants.

== Early life ==
Ellison was born on July 17, 1940. He graduated from The English High School in 1958 and went on to attend Boston University. From 1962 to 1963 he served in the United States Marine Corps and was discharged with a hearing disability. In 1966, he completed his courses in history and government at BU. He had enough credits to graduate, but could not receive his degree because he owed the school money. After working as a substitute teacher, Ellison became a provisional teacher in 1967. He became a full-time teacher at Boston Technical High School in 1969.

== Political career ==
Ellison's first campaign for public office was in 1966 when he ran for a seat in the Massachusetts House of Representatives. During the campaign, Ellison promised to be a representative for the Oak Square neighborhood and gave his address as 28 Oak Square Avenue, even though he did not live at that address. He also claimed to be a high school teacher when he had worked only one day as a substitute that year. In 1967, he ran for a seat on the Boston School Committee and finished fifteenth out of twenty candidates.

After unsuccessful campaigns for state representative in 1968 and school committee in 1969, Ellison won his first election in 1971 when was elected to the Boston School Committee. After his election to the school committee, Ellison took an unpaid leave of absence as a teacher. In January 1972, Ellison was forced to resign as a teacher due to Corporation Counsel Herbert P. Gleason's ruling that Ellison's leave of absence may have violated a law that forbade school committee members from holding positions in the school department. On January 3, 1972, Ellison began working as a legislative aide to three state representatives from Boston (Royal L. Bolling, Carter Kimbrel, and Franklin W. Holgate). On January 19, 1972, Speaker David M. Bartley fired Ellison effective January 31 - two months before his trial period was to end. According to one Kimbrel, Ellison "was never there". Later that year, he was hired as a probation officer by Judge Jerome P. Troy. He later served as chief clerk to the Registrar of Probate, James W. Hennigan Jr. In April 1972, Ellison initiated the committee's effort to remove Superintendent William H. Ohrenberger.

Ellison was reelected in 1973. On December 18, 1974, Ellison, John J. Kerrigan, and John J. McDonough, were held in civil contempt by Judge W. Arthur Garrity Jr. after refusing to approve a citywide busing plan. The trio was fined $500 a day until they approved the plan. Ellison was a candidate for chairman of the board in 1975. After a 2–2 tie with John J. McDonough, Kathleen Sullivan cast the deciding vote in favor of McDonough.

== Legal issues ==
In 1962, Ellison was found guilty of driving without a license. Between 1968 and 1972, Ellison was summoned to court seven times over complaints regarding unpaid debts. In 1970 he was acquitted in a case where he was charged with assault and battery on a cab driver. That same year he was arrested in Bourne, Massachusetts for drunkenness and accepted guilt in a civil case regarding a car crash in Boston.

On July 26, 1974, The Boston Globe’s "Spotlight" team and the Christian Science Monitor reported that in 1972 and 1973, Ellison and his campaign chairman endorsed and cashed over 50 paychecks worth $5,650 made out to Ellison's administrative assistants. According to his campaign chairman, Ellison received all of the money from the scheme. On July 29, Suffolk County District Attorney Garrett H. Byrne announced that his office would investigate the Globe's allegations against Ellison. One day later, U.S. Attorney James N. Gabriel announced that the Internal Revenue Service was investigating as well. On May 21, 1975, a Suffolk County grand jury indicted Ellison on larceny charges. Ellison pled not guilty and was released on personal recognizance. He alleged the charges against him were "a conspiracy" by "probusing and liberal forces".

On July 1, Ellison and his attorney, Daniel J. O'Connell Jr., were indicted on witness tampering charges for allegedly asking two witnesses to perjure themselves before the grand jury. On February 2, 1976, Ellison was found not guilty of the witness tampering charges. On November 24, 1976, Ellison was found guilty of larceny. He was sentenced to two years in the Norfolk House of Corrections. He began his sentence on December 8, 1976. On July 7, 1977, while on a prison furlough, Ellison filed his candidacy for the Boston City Council. He finished 18th out of 30 candidates in the 1977 Boston City Council election. On August 12, 1977, the Massachusetts Appeals Court upheld Ellison's larceny conviction. On December 8, 1977, Ellison was released on parole.

== Later life ==
He was an unsuccessful school committee candidate in 1979, 1981, and 1987. In 1982, he was charged with driving under the influence following a motor vehicle accident. On January 20, 1988, Ellison died at Boston City Hospital. He was 47 years old.

== Notes ==
1. School committee members were elected at-large, with the top five candidates winning council seats. In 1971, Ellison and John J. McDonough finished ahead of incumbent Joseph Lee while fellow incumbent John J. Craven Jr. did not run for reelection.
