= Marion Fahey =

American educator (1925–2022)

Marion J. Fahey (February 23, 1925 – January 11, 2022) was an American educator who served as superintendent of the Boston Public Schools during the Boston desegregation busing crisis.

== Early life ==
Fahey was born in Worcester, Massachusetts, on February 23, 1925. She was the daughter of John J. and Violet E. (Underwood) Fahey. She attended St. Gregory's grammar and high schools in Boston and earned a bachelor's degree in mathematics from Regis College and a master's degree in education from Boston College. She also did doctoral work at Harvard University and Nova Southeastern University.

== Early career ==
Fahey joined Boston Public Schools in 1949 as an elementary school teacher. From 1960 to 1965 she was an assistant principal at the Norcross School in South Boston. She then served as assistant director of teacher placement.

In 1966, she became director of elementary supervision. In 1970 she was promoted to associate superintendent, where she was responsible for the reading department, staff development, Title I programs, student teacher programs, and the attendance department.

== Superintendent of schools ==
On April 29, 1975, Fahey was appointed superintendent of the Boston Public Schools. She was elected on the second ballot when Paul Tierney who had voted for incumbent superintendent William J. Leary broke a 2–2 deadlock between Paul J. Ellison and John J. Kerrigan, who voted for Fahey and John J. McDonough and Kathleen Sullivan, who voted for associate superintendent Paul A. Kennedy. Fahey was Boston's first female superintendent and only the second woman to head a public school system in a major American city (after Barbara Sizemore of District of Columbia Public Schools).

Fahey's appointment came less than a year after Judge W. Arthur Garrity Jr.'s decision in Morgan v. Hennigan, which resulted in court-ordered desegregation busing in Boston Public Schools. Fahey's efforts to desegregate Boston Public Schools were supported by the U.S. District Court, but opposed by parents, students, teachers, and public officials. By 1976, two of the three members who had voted for Fahey were no longer on the committee (Kerrigan was elected to the city council and Ellison was defeated for reelection) and an effort was made to replace Fahey as superintendent. Edward Bennett Williams was approached about the superintendent's job, but was not interested. Her relationship with the school committee further deteriorated after an interview in which she made critical comments about three of the committee members was published in the Herald American. However, one of the three anti-Fahey members of the school committee, John J. McDonough, stated that he did not want to remove her from office because he wanted more time to evaluate her performance and he believed that if she was removed, Garrity would place the entire district in receivership and appoint Fahey as the receiver. When Fahey's contract expired in 1978, she was not placed on the list of finalists for superintendent. She was reassigned to the position of senior transition management officer by her successor Robert Coldwell Wood.

== Banking ==
After retiring from the school system, Fahey was a Trustee and Director at East Weymouth Savings Bank and from 1992 to 2015 was a director of the Hingham Institution for Savings. From 1993 to 2015 she also held the position of clerk at Hingham.

Fahey died on January 11, 2022, at her home in Hingham, Massachusetts. She was 96 years old.
