= Edward J. Logue =

Urban planner, public administrator

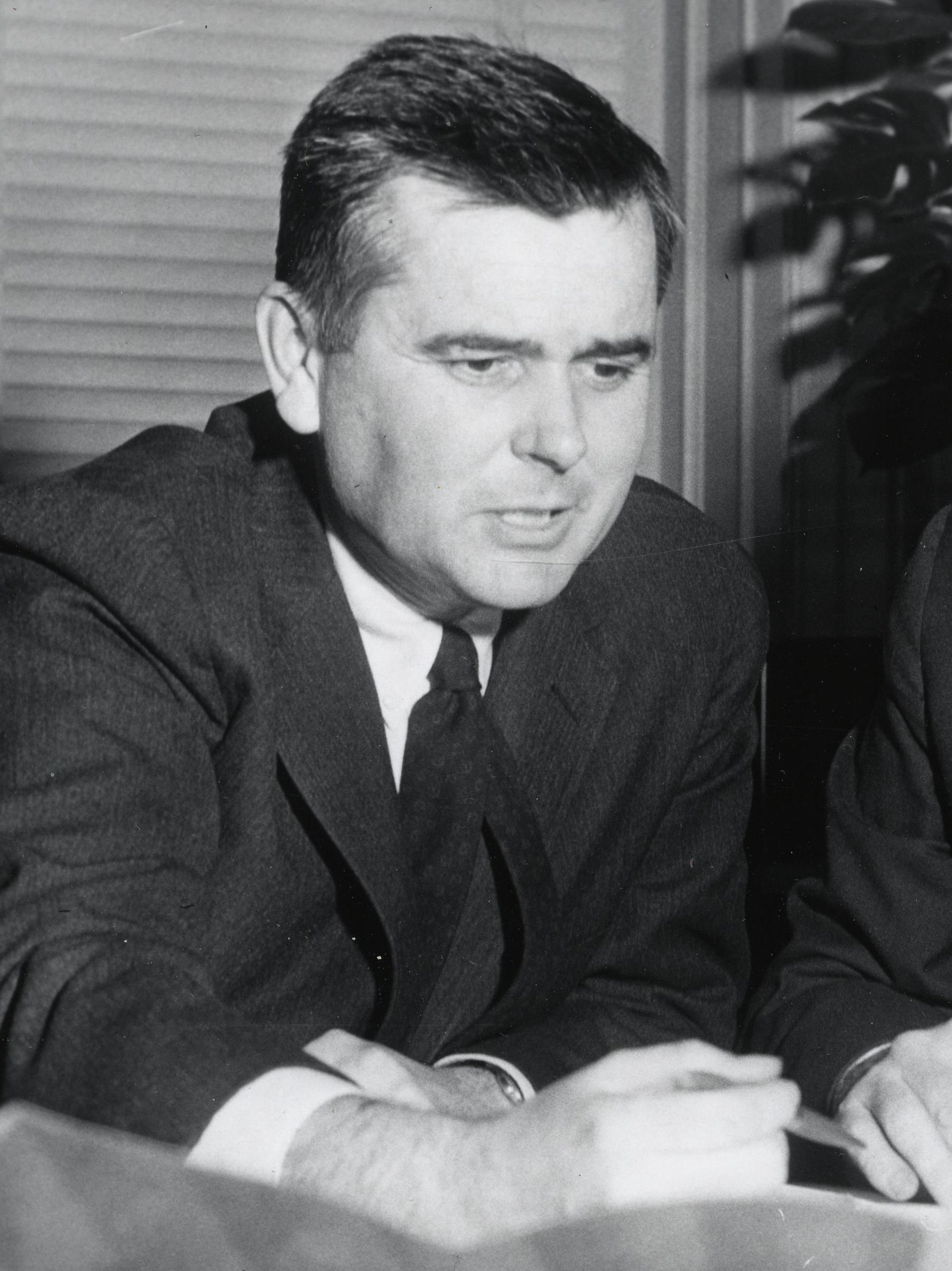
- Logue working in Boston during the 1960s

President of the South Bronx Development Organization
- In office 1979–1985
- Appointed by: Ed Koch
- Preceded by: Position established
- Succeeded by: Jorge Batista

Head of the New York State Urban Development Corporation
- In office 1968–1975
- Appointed by: Nelson Rockefeller

Director of the Boston Redevelopment Authority
- In office October 20, 1960 – August 4, 1967
- Appointed by: John F. Collins
- Preceded by: Kane Simonian
- Succeeded by: Francis X. Cuddy

New Haven Redevelopment Agency
- In office 1954–1960

Personal details
- Born: February 7, 1921 Philadelphia, Pennsylvania, U.S.
- Died: January 27, 2000 (aged 78) West Tisbury, Massachusetts
- Profession: Urban planner and public administrator

Edward Joseph Logue (February 7, 1921 – January 27, 2000) was an American urban planner and public administrator who worked in New Haven, Boston, and New York State. Commentators often compare Logue with Robert Moses - both were advocates of large-scale urban renewal in the United States from the 1950s through the 1970s.

Logue headed the New Haven Redevelopment Agency, Boston Redevelopment Authority, New York State Urban Development Corporation, and the South Bronx Development Organization. Logue is best known for overseeing major public works projects, such as Faneuil Hall-Quincy Market and Government Center in Boston, and the re-development of Roosevelt Island in New York City.

Logue was an unsuccessful candidate in the 1967 Boston mayoral election.

== Early life, education, and career ==
Logue was born on February 7, 1921, to Edward J. Logue and Resina Fay Logue in Philadelphia. He attended Yale University, graduating in 1942, and served as a lieutenant in the United States Air Force during World War II. For his service in the war, Logue was awarded an Air Medal with clusters. After the war, he found work for Chester Bowles, the governor of Connecticut, as a legal secretary.

== Head of the New Haven Redevelopment Agency (1954–1960) ==
Logue worked as development administrator for New Haven, Connecticut, from 1954 to 1960. He worked to redevelop New Haven's downtown area.

== Director of the Boston Redevelopment Authority (1960–1967) ==
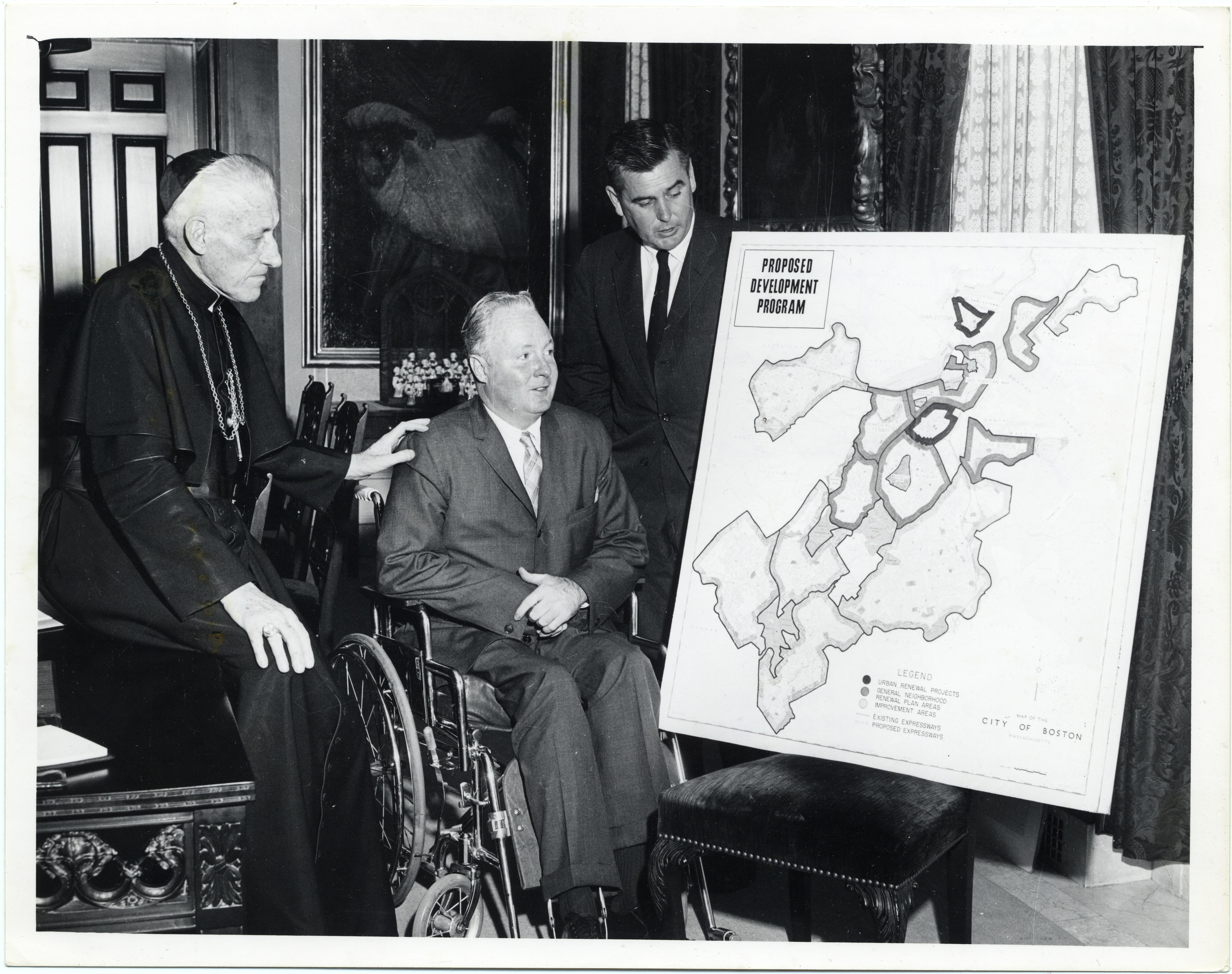
Logue (far right) presents plans for the redevelopment of Boston to mayor John F. Collins (center) and Cardinal Richard Cushing (far left)

Logue was made director of the Boston Redevelopment Authority (BRA) in 1960 at the by then-mayor John F. Collins. As head of the BRA, Logue sought to develop a "New Boston". One of the agency's major projects was a housing development in South End, known as Castle Square. They also oversaw construction of the Government Center, redevelopment of the Prudential Center as well as the cities waterfront. While Logue was at the BRA, the Faneuil Hall-Quincy Market redevelopment was planned, though it was not completed until 1976. He remained at the BRA until 1967, when Logue resigned to run an unsuccessful campaign for mayor of Boston.

== 1967 Boston mayoral candidacy ==
Logue ran for mayor of Boston in 1967, but failed to advance past the nonpartisan primary election. Prior to launching his campaign, Logue had been speculated as a candidate that would run if Mayor Collins did not seek reelection, and had indicated interesting doing so if the mayor declined to run. Collins ultimately announced in early June 1967 his decision not to seek reelection. Logue ran as Collins' preferred successor.

A first time candidate for public office, Logue claimed to have declined urban renewal positions in New York and Washington, D.C., in order to instead run out of a love for the city of Boston. A non-native to Boston, he was disparaged by opponents as an "intruder". It was claimed in an article published by The Reporter that many of his opponents had privately expressed that Logue was the best-qualified candidate.

On the eve of the nonpartisan primary election, The Boston Globe reported that most private opinion polls conducted shortly before the vote showed Kevin White with retaining his comfortable lead, but showed Louise Day Hicks to have slipped in support, with Logue supplanting her as the second-place candidate. The newspaper cautioned that these private polls could very probably be inaccurate, however. A WNAC-TV poll released two days before the election found Logue in a close third-place behind Hicks, with a chance to overtake her as the second-place finisher if a favorable share of vast amount of undecided respondents supported him.

Logue ultimately place fourth in the primary, well behind White and Hicks (who placed first and second, respectively) and only 53-votes behind third-place finisher John W. Sears Sears' candidacy, which centered its extensive and well-funded advertising campaign on solving neighborhood-related matters, was seen by The Reporter as overlapping with Logue's strength of experience in neighborhood revitalization. The Reporter speculated that the two candidates hurt one an others' chances by competing for similar voters. Logue placed first in the city's sole black-majority ward, which was located in the Washington Park area of Roxbury. This neighborhood was the site of a significant neighborhood revitalization effort overseen by Logue.

After losing his mayoral bid, Logue was named a professor of urban affairs at Boston University.

== Head of the New York State Urban Development Corporation (1968–1975) ==
Logue left Boston to head the new New York State Urban Development Corporation (UDC) from 1968 to 1975 that was created by New York Governor Nelson Rockefeller. During his tenure, the organization undertook projects at a quick pace. The organization largely forwent the processes of underwriting and due diligence that private projects typically had to undergo in order to ensure that revenue can be generated sufficient for long-term financing and operations. The agency anticipated that it would be able to rely upon continued federal government funding that would allow for it to sustain its finances. In 1975, the UDC defaulted on its debts (going bankrupt) in 1975 as consequence of factors that included a Nixon administration restructuring of housing programs, rising interest rates, and declining confidence of investors in the ability of the agency to pay back bonds. Logue resigned from the UDC after it went bankrupt. His reputation was greatly damaged as a result of the agency's bankruptcy.

As head of the agency, Logue oversaw the construction of various housing projects, notably on Roosevelt Island. 33,000 units were constructed under Logue. He also supported a failed plan to construct 900 low-income housing units in Westchester County, New York. In the late 1960s, he led a project to design a neighborhood in Fort Lincoln, Washington, D.C., for 25,000 people as requested by then-President Lyndon B. Johnson. However, nothing came of the planning.

== President of the South Bronx Development Organization (1979–1985) ==
From 1975 until 1985, Logue worked to revitalize the South Bronx, considered at the time a symbol of urban decay. On October 5, 1977, President Jimmy Carter walked on Charlotte Street, a desolate section of the area, drawing attention to its neglect and abandonment. Overall unemployment was estimated by several nongovernmental agencies to be around 25 percent. The area had been negatively impacted, in part, by an oversaturation of housing that resulted from the construction by the UDC of an excessive amount of new subsidized housing at a time when the borough's population was actively declining. Logue's work in the South Bronx culminated in a term as president of the South Bronx Development Organization from its creation in April 1979 until 1985, having been appointed to the position by New York City Mayor Ed Koch. During this period he initiated work that would vastly improve the area. The New York Times in a March 1987 Metro Matters column called Charlotte Street “a metaphor for urban renaissance.” President Bill Clinton, upon visiting Charlotte Street in 1997, declared the South Bronx to be a model for inner-city renewal.

== Later life ==
Logue died on January 27, 2000, in West Tisbury, Massachusetts. The mayor of Boston, Thomas Menino said of him: "Ed Logue was a guy who reinvented Boston".

== Electoral history ==
1967 Boston mayoral election
| Candidates | Primary election | | General election | |
| Candidates | Votes | % | Votes | % |
|---|---|---|---|---|
| Kevin White | 30,789 | 19.83 | 102,706 | 53.25 |
| Louise Day Hicks | 43,722 | 28.16 | 90,154 | 46.75 |
| John W. Sears | 23,924 | 15.41 | | |
| Edward J. Logue | 23,766 | 15.31 | | |
| Christopher A. Iannella | 18,343 | 11.82 | | |
| Stephen Davenport | 9,016 | 5.81 | | |
| Nicholas Abraham | 2,295 | 1.48 | | |
| Albert L. O'Neil | 1,471 | 0.95 | | |
| Peter F. Hines | 1,091 | 0.70 | | |
| John J. McDonough | 830 | 0.54 | | |
