= Jean Sullivan McKeigue =

American politician (1946–2022)

President of the Boston School Committee
- In office 1982
- Preceded by: John D. O'Bryant
- Succeeded by: Kevin A. McCluskey

Member of the Boston School Committee
- In office 1980–1984

Personal details
- Born: March 6, 1946 Chelsea, Massachusetts, U.S.
- Died: February 4, 2022 (aged 75) Lake Worth, Florida, U.S.
- Spouse: Joe McKeigue (m. 1968)
- Relations: Billy Sullivan (father); Kathleen Sullivan Alioto (sister); Chuck Sullivan (brother); Patrick Sullivan (brother)
- Children: 4
- Education: Harvard College; Harvard Law School

Jean Sullivan McKeigue (March 6, 1946 – February 4, 2022) was an American politician who was a member of the Boston School Committee from 1980 to 1984 and was the president of the committee in 1983.

== Early life ==
Sullivan was the daughter of Billy Sullivan and Mary Malone Sullivan. She graduated from Ursuline Academy and earned a bachelor's degree in history from Newton College of the Sacred Heart in 1968. She married educator Joe McKeigue shortly after her graduation and the couple moved to Chicago, where she worked as a teacher in an economically challenged neighborhood. They then moved to New York City, where she graduated with a master's in early-childhood education from the Columbia University Teachers College in 1974. In 1976, the McKeigues settled in Jamaica Plain, where they raised their four children.

== School committee ==
On March 19, 1979, McKeigue announced her candidacy for the Boston School Committee. Her sister, Kathleen Sullivan Alioto, had been the top vote getter in the previous two elections, but chose not to run for reelection. She received the fourth most votes in an election where the top five candidates were elected. She and John D. O'Bryant were seen as the committee's liberal wing and opposed the removal of superintendent Robert Coldwell Wood. After Wood was ousted, McKeigue led the search committee that chose his successor, Robert R. Spillane and was his lead supporter for reappointment. In 1981, she was a candidate for school board president, but lost to O'Bryant on a 3 to 2 vote. She was instead elected vice-president.

She ran for re-election in 1981 and received the second most votes. On January 4, 1982, McKeigue was elected committee president on a 3 to 2 vote.

Rather than run for a third term, McKeigue was an at-large candidate in the 1983 Boston City Council election. She finished in sixth-place in a race where the top four vote-getters were seated on the council.

== Later life ==
After leaving the school committee, McKeigue was a regional representative and corporate relations specialist for the National Alliance of Business. From 1988 to 2003, she was Boston College's director of community affairs. She was the school's chief liaison with municipal governments and civic groups. In 2004, she was diagnosed with mantle cell lymphoma. She died on February 4, 2022, at her home in Lake Worth, Florida.
