= Elvira "Pixie" Palladino =

American politician (1931–2006)

- Born: Elvira Nastri; November 8, 1931; Boston, Massachusetts
- Died: August 31, 2006 (aged 74); Melrose, Massachusetts
- Board member of: Member of the Boston School Committee, Executive board member of Restore Our Alienated Rights
- Spouse: Nunzio Palladino
- Children: 2
- Relatives: 3 siblings, including Rosamond Totela

Elvira "Pixie" Palladino (née Nastri; November 8, 1931 – August 31, 2006) was an American politician from Boston, Massachusetts, best known for her affiliation with Restore Our Alienated Rights (ROAR) and her opposition to court-ordered busing in the 1960s and 1970s. She was elected to the Boston School Committee several times in the 1970s, and served three two-year terms. Though she was cleared of bribery charges related to the Boston School Committee in 1981 this ultimately led to the loss of her Committee seat.

== Early life ==
Palladino and her twin sister, Rosamond Totela, were born on November 8, 1931, in East Boston to an Italian shoemaker. Before becoming involved in politics, Palladino was primarily a "housewife and mother of two," as well as "a Girl Scout leader [and] organizer of a girls hockey team".

Her work led to her being elected for the "executive committee of the Curtis Gyld Elementary School Home and School Association" and then moved up to being "president of [her oldest daughter's East Boston High] Home and School Association and an East Boston representative on the city wide federation".

This career in school organizations transitioned into politics when she joined others in the Home and School Association in opposing the "'racial imbalance law,' an early effort at voluntary busing". She participated in a campaign that defeated an "East Boston priest-representative who had supported the racial imbalance law".

== Personal life ==
Elvira married Nunzio Palladino and had two children with him, Nancy (later Mrs. O'Brien) and Robert Palladino. The marriage ended in divorce at some point.

Elvira Palladino died on August 31, 2006, aged 74, from diabetes at the Melrose-Wakefield Hospital.

== ROAR ==
Palladino headed ROAR's "Easy Boston branch (the One If by Land, Two If by Sea Civic Association)". She served on the executive board of the organization called ROAR (Restore Our Alienated Rights), which was created by Councilwoman Louise Day Hicks. She represented East Boston while serving on this board. While Hicks described ROAR as nonviolent, "ROAR was behind some of the violent clashes that marked Boston's school desegregation efforts" and members reportedly spat on Senator Edward M. Kennedy. Palladino insisted racial prejudice contributed to her opposition to busing, claiming "...don't touch our children and take them out of our schools and send them into an area like Roxbury where the crime is so high".

Palladino was also often compared to Hicks, though the two were "temperamentally at odds". Palladino "confronted her world with gritty pugnacity", was caustically anticlerical, and rarely hesitated to speak her mind, often "in explicit street language, which earned her the nickname 'Garbage Mouth'". When Monsignor Mimie Pitaro (a state legislator) opposed the repeal of the Racial Imbalance Act, Palladino reportedly "intercepted him outside the chamber and gave him 'the Italian kiss of death' -- three fingers taken to the lips, then quickly moved toward the target".

On September 8, 1965, at McKay Elementary School, Palladino met with Lucille Roberts and seventeen other ROAR members (with one male member), "who came to protest in the name of 'fredom of choice' and constitutional rights of assembly [...] Palladino hollered at Roberts, who was on the playground, 'You fucking white trash, you fuck niggers, you're a nigger lover.' Palladino's actions were not isolated and trickled down to the next generation".

In 1973, Palladino told the East Boston Community News that she doesn't "believe in integration. God made people of different colors and once we lose our identity, we have nothing." She later denied those remarks, but her position on race was less equivocal than Hicks's. After her election to the School Committee in November 1975, Palladino "became the spokesperson for those in the anti-busing movement who accused Louise of pulling her punches".

On June 3, 1975, an article in the Real Paper by Rep. Raymond Flynn claimed there was a secret alliance between Mayor Kevin H. White and ROAR, claiming that "the mayor had met Nov. 20 with the board; that one ROAR activist and the husbands of Elvira Palladino of East Boston and Janet Palmariello of West Roxbury had gotten jobs on the city payroll after the November meeting". Mayor White dismissed the claim, responding that it was entirely false on June 2, 1975, though he did provide some aid to the antibusing crowd.

During the mid-1970s, Palladino led an "enormous amount of antibusing energy [out of] East Boston" thanks in part to her election to the School Committee in 1975. Consequently, "throughout the Northeast, of course, Italian-Americans participated prominently in white backlash movements and 'produced white-hope saviors like Frank Rizzo in Philadelphia, Tough Tony Imperiale in Newark, and Mario Procaccino in New York City'".

=== Protests ===
On June 8, 1975, Palladino led ROAR (Restore Our Alienated Rights) members in a protest outside of John I. Taylor's South Natick home. More than 1000 antibusing demonstrators showed up in total. Taylor was the "president of Affiliated Publications, the parent company of The Boston Globe ... and was one of 25 directors of the United Way".

Palladino, characterized as the ROAR leader at the time, "charged The [Boston] Globe with not being objective in its coverage of the busing issue". She mentioned opposing both Taylor and Federal Judge W. Arthur Garrity Jr. (who ordered busing to desegregate Boston schools). ROAR members and supporters "assembled at the South Shore Plaza at 1 p.m. before driving on Routes 128 and 16 in a motorcade of about 250 cars to South Natick". Three police officers blocked access to the home by standing in the driveway. ROAR protestors once again protested against The Boston Globe on June 21, 1975. This time they marched outside of The Boston Globe on Morrisey Avenue in Boston, and Palladino participated in the protest.

=== Exit ===
Palladino claimed in a press conference on March 10, 1976, that she would resign from the executive board of ROAR if "her ouster is called for in a vote of the entire membership and if other 'political figures' on the board resign". Palladino was ousted from the executive board in early March 1976, on account of her also being an elected public official. At the time, Louise Day Hicks was still a ROAR member but did not sit on the ROAR executive board. In addition, the South Boston chapter of ROAR "voted, 340–2, against Palladino's continuing as a board member". This was a contentious issue as ROAR members believed that the organization was inherently nonpolitical.

Members of local ROAR chapters voted on kicking Palladino off the executive board. On March 9, 1976, members of the West Roxbury chapter of ROAR voted "in favor of the ouster of Elvira Palladino from the executive board of the citywide antibusing group." All 60 members, except three absentee members, voted against Palladino. Powder Keg, the Charlestown chapter of ROAR, voted on March 9, 1976, to endorse the ouster of Elvira Palladino. The vote against Palladino "was 85-25... [with] five abstentions." Following the initial actions to oust Palladino, members of the ROAR executive board announced on March 6, 1976, that they would suspend "their weekly citywide meetings in Boston's City Hall".

== Career ==
On November 4, 1975, Palladino was elected to Boston's School Committee. Her campaign platform focused on "magnet schools, vocational education, better reading programs and a voluntary busing plan". She attributed her win to "the little people' of Boston". During the time of her election, she was still living in her twin sister's house. Palladino legally changed her first name to Pixie for her candidacy (her given name is Elvira). She was "the first Italian-American in recent memory to serve on the normally all-Irish School Committee. She replaced the incumbent Paul J. Ellison, who at the time was awaiting trial "on charges of pocketing school department funds and attempting to tamper with the grand jury investigating him".

During Palladino's time on the School Committee, she said she would ask the committee to "rescind its approval of Jerome Winegar as headmaster of South Boston High School". She claimed that he was a failure at his previous school, Wilson Junior High School in St. Paul, Minnesota, "because the school he administered was closed April 1 and 2 [1976, due to] racial fighting".

=== Presidential Committee vote ===
In December 1979, Palladino regained a seat on the Boston School Committee, after being defeated in 1977. At the time, she could "provide the third vote John J. McDonough need[ed] to become president of the five-member committee Jan. 7". McDonough historically opposed busing but was perceived as a moderate on the issue. He claimed that he would not change his stance on busing for votes.

=== Familial connections ===
As of July 11, 1980, Palladino's nephew — William D. Manning Jr. — was hired to the Boston School Committee as "assistant to the deputy superintendent of management," with a wage of $21,000. His hiring bypassed normal hiring practices, as his appointment was approved by the committee "as part of a package of personnel actions", with many committee members not knowing what they were voting on. The approval vote was 5–0. Other relatives of were hired onto the School Department's payroll. Her daughter, Nancy O'Brien, served as her secretary. And a son, Robert, worked as a per diem custodian.

=== Voting history ===
Palladino voted against "virtually every progressive program to come before the committee... [including] multicultural activities, bilingual programs, university participation, district planning and parental education". Her reasoning was that she wanted to give "direct services to kids" and that she always voted against "federally funded contracts," believing the federal funds destroyed local school systems. Superintendent Robert Coldwell Wood often suggested progressive programs, that were often passed with the usual dissenting vote from Palladino (and sometimes from Gerald O'Leary.) Wood was ultimately ousted in a 3–1 vote, with Palladino voting to get rid of Wood due to a budget deficiency and an instance of unprofessionalism.

Elvira Palladino was the fourth vote on the Boston School Committee, to lay off nearly 1000 teachers on August 18, 1981, at a meeting held at West Roxbury High School. The total 960 layoffs (nearly one-fifth of all teachers) was made up of "710 tenured teachers and 250 provisionals". School Superintendent Robert R. Spillane claimed "it may be possible to rehire 120 to 125 of the dismissed teachers with $3 million in over-budgeted funds". Superior Court Judge Thomas R. Morse Jr. ruled that the motion could only be passed with a four-out-of-five vote to make the layoffs. Due to a lack of funds, he "refused Boston Teacher Union appeals to uphold the job security provision in its three-year contract". At the time, people believed Palladino would vote against the action in favor of affirmative action, due to the seniority violations in the measure. Due to Judge W. Arthur Garrity Jr.'s ruling on Boston's school desegregation case, "four white teachers had to be laid off for every black teacher, so the level of black teachers in the system did not slip below its current 19 percent". Consequently, many white teachers will be laid off.

At the time of John J. McDonough's bribery trial, Palladino was trying to get re-elected to the School Board Committee (a five-member committee) which would be her third two-year term; she placed sixth in the primary.

=== Television ===
In 1987, WGBH's Frontline produced a PBS documentary called Street Cop which focused on "relations between the police and the black community in Boston". Palladino was present at the "advance screening of the film at Boston's World Trade Center". She "dismissed the film as 'a fairytale', [and asserted]: We're back where we started. This film is being shown at the wrong time. I asked Channel 7 and the mayor of Boston that this picture not be shown at this time. It's very sad for the people of Charlestown. I don't think this film does this justice'".

== Bribery trial ==
In October 1980, Elvira Palladino appeared before a grand jury in a bribery trial for School Committeeman John J. McDonough. She denied receiving any bribes, claiming "she had been implicated falsely because of her strong anti-busing stand". In addition, during her appearance before the grand jury, she did not invoke her Fifth Amendment privilege.

Elvira Palladino was subpoenaed by the defense at a subsequent bribery trial. Palladino was served the subpoena on the same day her former School Committee colleague, Gerald F. O'Leary, testified he gave both her and McDonough a $5000 bribe from a bus company. The charges were that she accepted the money in "exchange for a favorable vote on a School Committee bus contract". Palladino denied O' Leary's allegations, calling his testimony "complete fabrication and lies" in a press conference on September 28, 1981. O'Leary alleged that Palladino was part of a bribery scheme "involving ARA Services Inc., a bus company with a $40 million School Department contract".

After a three-week trial, Palladino was cleared of all charges in mid-October 1981. McDonough was also ultimately cleared of all charges. Both McDonough and Palladino lost their School Committee seats. As both School Committee members were city employees at the time of the hearings, the city was technically liable. The fees "may be deducted from the School Committee's $210 million budget" or Boston taxpayers would have to pay an estimated $77,000 in total fees for the defense of both School Committee members. Palladino paid $5000 for her legal defense, provided by Attorney Robert Stranziani.

== See also ==
- Boston busing crisis
- Restore Our Alienated Rights
- Louise Day Hicks
