= Robert Coldwell Wood =

American political scientist (1923–2005)

Robert Wood
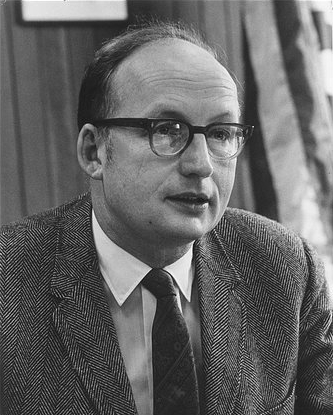

Superintendent of Boston Public Schools
- In office 1978–1980
- Preceded by: Marion Fahey
- Succeeded by: Robert R. Spillane

President of the University of Massachusetts System
- In office 1970–1977
- Preceded by: John W. Lederle
- Succeeded by: Franklin Patterson (acting)

2nd United States Secretary of Housing and Urban Development
- In office January 7, 1969 – January 20, 1969
- President: Lyndon B. Johnson
- Preceded by: Robert C. Weaver
- Succeeded by: George W. Romney

Personal details
- Born: September 16, 1923 St. Louis, Missouri, U.S.
- Died: April 1, 2005 (aged 81) Boston, Massachusetts, U.S.
- Party: Democratic
- Spouse: Margaret Byers (m. 1952)
- Children: 3, including Frank and Maggie
- Education: Princeton University (BA); Harvard University (MA, MPA, PhD)

Military service
- Allegiance: United States
- Branch/service: United States Army
- Rank: Sergeant
- Battles/wars: World War II
- Awards: Bronze Star Medal

Robert Coldwell Wood (September 16, 1923 – April 1, 2005) was an American political scientist, academic and government administrator, and professor of political science at the Massachusetts Institute of Technology (MIT). From 1965 to 1969, Wood served as the Under Secretary of the Department of Housing and Urban Development under President Lyndon B. Johnson, and for two weeks as the Secretary at the end of the Johnson Administration.

After his return to MIT, he directed the Joint Center for Urban Studies at MIT and Harvard. He also had a joint appointment as chairman of the Massachusetts Bay Transportation Authority. He served as president of the University of Massachusetts (1970-1977), overseeing expansion of programs, including construction of a campus in south Boston.

== Early life and career ==
Wood was born on September 16, 1923, in St Louis, Missouri, the son of Mary (née Bradshaw) Wood and Thomas Frank Wood. He won a scholarship to Princeton University, interrupting his studies during World War II to serve in the U.S. Army. Wood saw action during Battle of the Bulge, won a Bronze Star, and rose to the rank of sergeant.

After graduating from Princeton University, Wood earned three degrees from Harvard University: a master's in public administration, and a master's and a doctorate in government.

Wood taught political science at Massachusetts Institute of Technology from 1959 to 1965. From 1965 to 1969, Wood served as the Under Secretary of the newly created Department of Housing and Urban Development under President Lyndon B. Johnson.

In 1968, Wood was awarded the Wiener Medal for Cybernetics from the American Society for Cybernetics. Following the resignation of Robert C. Weaver as Secretary of HUD, Wood served briefly in the position for two weeks before George Romney took office.

Wood returned to MIT, where he directed the Joint Center for Urban Studies at MIT and Harvard. At the same time, he was appointed as head of the Massachusetts Bay Transportation Authority (MBTA).

From 1970 to 1977, he served as president of the University of Massachusetts. During these years, Wood led the expansion of the university, to include UMass Medical Center in Worcester and its Boston campus. He also played a key role in bringing the John F. Kennedy Library and Museum to its site at Columbia Point, next to UMass-Boston. He also taught at Wesleyan University.

In 1978, Wood was chosen to serve as superintendent of Boston Public Schools. It was the first time since Franklin B. Dyer's hiring in 1912 that someone outside of Boston Public Schools was given the job of superintendent. He took over the district while it was in the midst of the busing crisis—a period in which the district was under a federal court order to desegregate. In 1980, the school committee voted to remove Wood from office, with anti-busing members John J. McDonough, Elvira "Pixie" Palladino, and Gerald O'Leary voting for his ouster and John D. O'Bryant and Jean Sullivan McKeigue opposing.

== Personal life ==
Wood married the former Margaret Byers, on March 22, 1952. They had three children, including the actor Frank Wood and the Governor of New Hampshire and U.S. Senator Maggie Hassan. Wood died from stomach cancer at his home in Boston, on April 1, 2005, aged 81.

== Publications ==
Wood's best-known books are:

- 1958. Suburbia: Its People and Their Politics
- 1959. Metropolis against Itself.
- 1961. 1400 Governments; The Political Economy of the New York Metropolitan Region. With Vladimir V. Almendinger.
- 1972. The Necessary Majority: Middle America and the Urban Crisis
- 1993. Whatever Possessed the President? Academic Experts and Presidential Policy, 1960-88.
- 1995. Turnabout Time: Public Higher Education in the Commonwealth. With Richard A. Hogarty and Aundrea E. Kelley.

Political offices
Preceded by Robert C. Weaver	United States Secretary of Housing and Urban Development; 1969	Succeeded by George W. Romney
Academic offices
Preceded by John Lederle	President of the University of Massachusetts System; 1970–1977	Succeeded by Franklin Patterson; Acting
Preceded by Marion Fahey	Superintendent of Boston Public Schools; 1978–1980	Succeeded by Robert R. Spillane
