= Katherine Craven =

American politician

Katherine Kane Craven
- Born: October 10, 1906
- Died: July 17, 1984
- Known for: Boston City Council member

Katherine Kane Craven (October 10, 1906 – July 17, 1984) was a member of the Boston City Council in Boston, Massachusetts, from 1964 to 1967. She was the "first woman elected" citywide to the council. "Craven was an outspoken foe of urban renewal. ... On the council she never voted for a renewal project. ... Her bete noire during four boisterous years as councilor was Boston Redevelopment Authority (BRA) Administrator Edward Logue."

"She was born in Charlestown and was a graduate of St. Patrick's Commercial High School, Watertown, and attended the Bentley School of Accounting. She was secretary to the Joseph P. Kennedy Enterprises before her marriage, where she met her husband, John J. Craven." She married "state Rep. John J. Craven (D-Roxbury, 1930-1938); ... her husband later served as her administrative assistant when she was on the City Council."

Craven was the mother of eleven children, having given birth to 16 children in all. Katherine and John Craven's 11 surviving children, Patricia, Maureen, John J. Jr., Sheila, Kathleen, Pauline, Francis Xavier, twins Brendan Michael and Barbara Ellen, Susan and Timothy, resided in the Boston area and produced 52 grandchildren.
