= Kathleen Sullivan Alioto =

American educator and politician

Chairperson of the Boston School Committee
- In office 1977
- Preceded by: John J. McDonough
- Succeeded by: David Finnegan

Member of the Boston School Committee
- In office 1974–1979

Personal details
- Born: Kathleen Sullivan; June 20, 1944 (age 82) Washington, DC
- Party: Democratic
- Spouse: Joseph Alioto (m. 1978; died 1998)
- Relations: Billy Sullivan (father); Jean Sullivan McKeigue (sister); Chuck Sullivan (brother); Patrick Sullivan (brother)
- Children: 2
- Education: Manhattanville College; Harvard University, Ed.D
- Occupation: Educator; Politician fundraiser

Kathleen Sullivan Alioto (born June 20, 1944) is an American educator and politician who served on the Boston School Committee as a member (1974–79) and its president (1977). She played a role in the desegregation of the Boston public schools.

== Early life and education ==
Sullivan Alioto is the daughter of Billy Sullivan, founder and long-time owner of the New England Patriots. She grew up outside Boston.

She graduated from Manhattanville College. She has a doctorate from Harvard Graduate School of Education.

== Boston School Committee ==
Sullivan Alioto taught school for six years before being elected to the School Committee, first as a teacher of disabled children in Harlem and Bedford-Stuyvesant, then at the John Marshall School in Boston's Dorchester neighborhood, where she taught children with behavioral issues. While serving on the School Committee, Sullivan Alioto earned her doctorate at Harvard. She is credited with having been a dedicated member of the School Committee (an elected, unpaid job,) Sullivan Alioto worked full-time to improve the quality of the school.

Sullivan Alioto was regarded as the "most liberal" of the five members of the Boston School Committee when, in December 1974, it voted 3-2 to refuse to comply with the order of Federal District Judge Wendell Arthur Garrity Jr. to desegregate the Boston Public Schools. At the height of the School Committee debates over whether to comply with the Federal Court order to desegregate the Boston Public Schools, in 1974 and 1975, as described in Newsday by reporter John Treen, "the argument is between Kerrigan and Sullivan. Sullivan is the most liberal of the Committee, Kerrigan the most vocally conservative. Kerrigan accuses Sullivan of questioning an appointment... Sullivan explodes."

The University of Massachusetts, Boston, in a report as part of its Collaborative History of Segregation in Boston, described Sullivan Alioto as "an outsider" who "entered the Boston School Committee in 1974 and completely challenged the status quo, altering the committee for the better. ... By taking a look at Kathleen Sullivan’s role in the move to desegregate Boston Public Schools, we gain an often overlooked narrative because of how she did not quite fit in with her contemporaries at the time."

Sullivan Alioto was succeeded on the school committee by her sister, Jean Sullivan McKeigue.

== Later career ==
She was a Democratic Party primary election candidate for the United States Senate in Massachusetts in 1978, finishing third.

Sullivan Alioto served as executive director of the Foundation of the City College of San Francisco. In 2016, Sullivan Alioto was a member of an advisory panel that recommended that the federal Department of Education sever ties with the Accrediting Council for Independent Colleges and Schools because the group was accrediting predatory and fraudulent for-profit colleges.

== Personal life ==
From 1974 to 1976, Sullivan Alioto dated the then-closeted Barney Frank. In April 1976, Sullivan Alioto's father suggested that, while she was attending a convention in San Francisco, she have lunch with former San Francisco Mayor Joseph Alioto. She and Alioto married in 1978 and remained together until his death in 1998. Because Alioto was divorced, the wedding was performed by excommunicated Catholic priest and activist Joseph O'Rourke.

Sullivan Alioto has two children, Patrick Joseph Sullivan Alioto and Domenica Alioto.
