= Thomas S. Eisenstadt =

Sheriff of Suffolk County, Massachusetts
- In office 1969–1977
- Preceded by: John W. Sears
- Succeeded by: Dennis J. Kearney

Chairman of the Boston School Committee
- In office 1968–1968
- Preceded by: John J. McDonough
- Succeeded by: John J. Kerrigan
- In office 1966–1966
- Preceded by: Louise Day Hicks
- Succeeded by: John J. McDonough

Personal details
- Born: May 21, 1936 (age 90) Boston, Massachusetts

Thomas Stephen Eisenstadt (born May 21, 1936) was sheriff of Suffolk County, Massachusetts from 1969 to 1977, during which time he was the captioned plaintiff in Eisenstadt v. Baird (1972), a landmark United States Supreme Court decision on contraception.

Elected to the Boston School Committee in 1965, Eisenstadt was a strong supporter of desegregation efforts.
