= Billy Sullivan (businessman) =

American businessman (1915–1998)

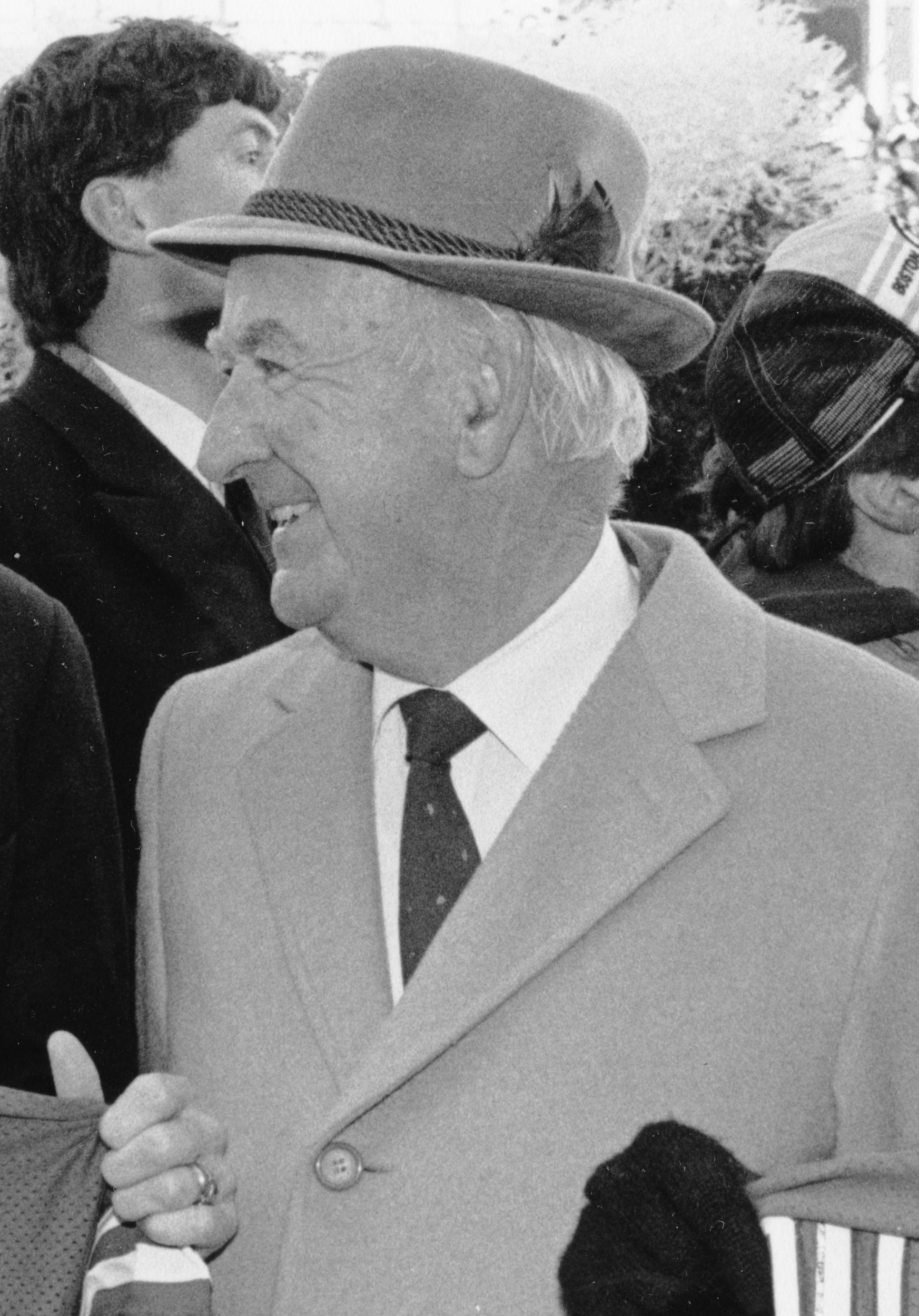
- Sullivan in 1985
- Born: William Hallissey Sullivan Jr. September 13, 1915; Lowell, Massachusetts, U.S.
- Died: February 23, 1998 (aged 82); Atlantis, Florida, U.S.
- Education: Boston College
- Known for: Founder of the New England Patriots
- Children: Kathleen Sullivan Alioto; Jean Sullivan McKeigue; Chuck Sullivan; Patrick Sullivan; Nancie Chamberlain; Billy Sullivan Jr.
- Family: Joseph Alioto (son-in-law)

William Hallissey Sullivan Jr. (September 13, 1915 – February 23, 1998) was an American businessman who owned the Boston Patriots franchise from their inception in the American Football League (AFL, 1960–1969) until their sale, as the New England Patriots of the National Football League (NFL), to Victor Kiam in 1988.

== Early life ==
Sullivan was born in Lowell, Massachusetts, in 1915. He graduated from Lowell High School in 1933, then from Boston College in 1937. The son of a Boston Globe correspondent, Sullivan became a sportswriter after college. He also served as a publicity director for Boston College, the University of Notre Dame, and the Boston Braves franchise of Major League Baseball. Sullivan also served in the United States Navy during this time. In 1947, while the Braves' public relations director, Sullivan helped found The Jimmy Fund, a pediatric cancer charity.

== NFL career ==
=== NFL franchise attempt ===
In 1959, Sullivan requested a National Football League franchise in Boston. The NFL turned his offer down, in part because five previous attempts at NFL franchises in Boston had either folded or moved.

=== AFL franchise ===
After the NFL denied his request, Sullivan sought to become a charter member of the new American Football League. He led a syndicate that was awarded the league's eighth and final team for their inaugural season in 1960 as the Boston Patriots, paying a franchise fee of $25,000. Sullivan named his son, Patrick, as general manager and his other son, Chuck, as executive vice president. In 1964, Sullivan helped the AFL negotiate a 5-year, $30 million television agreement with NBC.

=== AFL–NFL merger ===
In 1966, Sullivan played a part in the AFL–NFL merger by successfully requesting an antitrust exemption from the United States Congress.

=== New England Patriots ===
In March 1971, Sullivan changed the team's name from the Boston Patriots to the New England Patriots to correspond with the team's move to Schaefer Stadium in Foxborough, Massachusetts, and to embrace all of New England (a previous decision in February to rebrand as the "Bay State Patriots" was rejected).

In 1974, Sullivan was ousted as president of the Patriots despite owning more than 20% of the voting stock. By the end of 1975, the Sullivans had bought out the minority partners and regained control. This was out of necessity; the only way he could pay back the $5.3 million in loans that he took out to buy out his partners was to acquire all of the outstanding stock. In order to do this, Sullivan needed to buy out the non-voting public shareholders. Sullivan structured a deal that provided the non-voting public shareholders $15/share and the transaction was approved by the shareholder class. Prior to the shareholders vote, Sullivan pushed a bill through the Massachusetts legislature that allowed companies to buy back non-voting public shares if a majority of shareholders voted in favor, rather than the two-thirds vote that was required before the law was passed.

==== Class action lawsuit ====
One shareholder refused to tender his shares and filed suit. In 1986, the Massachusetts Supreme Judicial Court found the purchase of the minority shareholders was illegal, since it was for Sullivan's personal benefit. The court deemed his actions constituted a waste of corporate assets. The court ordered that the shareholders be paid $80 per share plus 9% interest per year since the purchase was completed.

==== Selling the team ====
A series of bad investments in the 1980s, the biggest being The Jacksons' 1984 Victory Tour (bankrolled by son and heir apparent Chuck), forced Sullivan to put the Patriots on the market. The Sullivans had never been among the wealthier NFL owners; by at least one estimate, the losses from the tour equaled the Sullivans' net worth. The Victory Tour losses were particularly hard on the Patriots because Sullivan had only been able to get financing for the tour by pledging Sullivan Stadium as collateral. Even with the Patriots making the Super Bowl in 1985, the revenue from the team was not enough to service the debt (mainly due to the Patriots having to play all of their playoff games on the road). With no other way to readily pay back the debt, the Sullivans put both the team and the stadium on the market in 1985 for $100 million.

In 1988, Sullivan asked the NFL if he could sell 50% of the team in a public offering. The NFL refused the request, and instead appointed a four-man committee vested with what amounted to "wartime powers" to use any means to solve the Patriots' financial woes, up to and including selling the team. In effect, the NFL seized control of the team. NFL Commissioner Pete Rozelle made clear that it would be untenable for the Patriots to stay in Sullivan's hands, saying that the only resolution was "selling the controlling interest" in the team. One of the committee members, Tampa Bay Buccaneers owner Hugh Culverhouse, expressed a similar sentiment, saying that there was "no resolution" for the team under Sullivan's ownership. For all intents and purposes, Sullivan's stewardship of the Patriots was over.

In hopes of finding a way out, Sullivan asked Reebok CEO Paul Fireman to purchase a stake in the team. When that effort failed, Sullivan was forced to sell the team to a syndicate headed by Remington Products owner Victor Kiam for $83 million. Sullivan remained as team president until 1992, when he and Kiam sold the team to James Orthwein. However, the stadium lapsed into bankruptcy and was purchased by Boston paper magnate Robert Kraft. Kraft used the stadium's lease as leverage to stage what amounted to a hostile takeover of the Patriots and buy from Orthwein (who was planning to relocate the Patriots to St. Louis) in 1994.

During Sullivan's 28 seasons owning the team, the Patriots tallied 14 winning records, made six playoff appearances, played in the 1963 AFL Championship Game and represented the AFC in Super Bowl XX.

In 1991, Sullivan filed a $116 million antitrust lawsuit against the NFL and accepted an $11.5 million settlement of the case in 1996.

== Death ==
After an 8-year battle with prostate cancer, Sullivan died in his Atlantis, Florida retirement home in 1998.
