= Joseph Lee (recreation advocate) =

American social worker, author and philanthropist

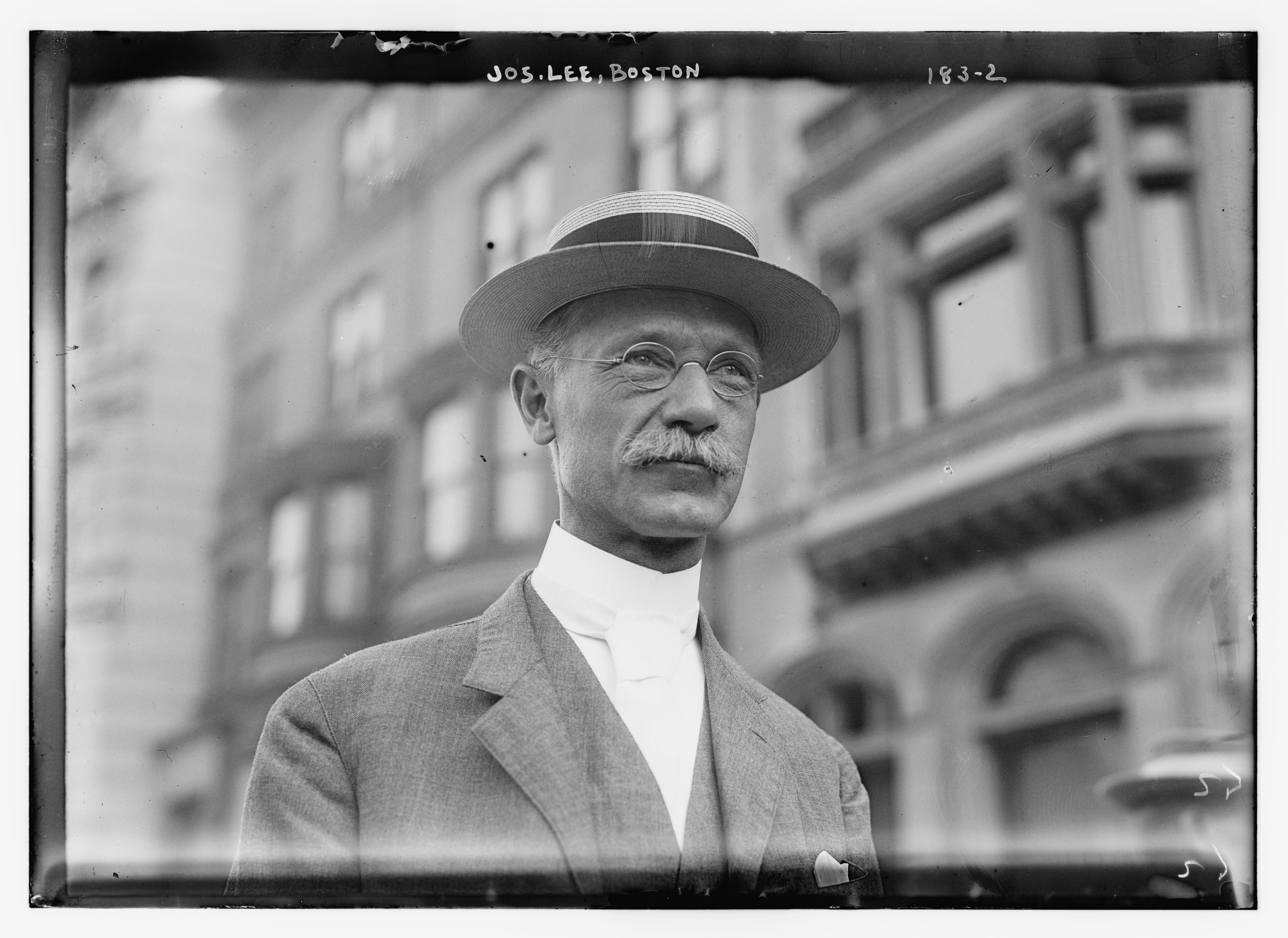
- Born: March 8, 1862; Brookline, Massachusetts, U.S.
- Died: July 28, 1937 (aged 75); Cohasset, Massachusetts, U.S.
- Education: Harvard and Harvard Law School
- Occupations: Social activist, philanthropist
- Children: Joseph Lee Jr.

Joseph Lee (March 8, 1862 – July 28, 1937) was a wealthy Bostonian who trained as a lawyer but never practiced law, and is considered the "founder of the playground movement". He was a social worker, author, and philanthropist. Lee believed that community life could be strengthened by playgrounds and play. Lee was also a proponent of eugenics and a major financial supporter of the Immigration Restriction League, a Boston-based group that promoted race-based eugenics as a basis for restricting immigration from eastern and southern Europe.

== Background ==
Joseph Lee was born on March 8, 1862, in Brookline, Massachusetts, to Elizabeth Perkins (Cabot) and Henry Lee, a banker.

In 1897, Lee married Margaret Cabot. They had four children. Margaret Cabot Lee died in 1920 and Lee remarried his secretary, Margsion Snow, in 1930. Lee's daughter, Susan Lee, was active in her father's work and later served as vice-president of the National Recreation and Park Association. His son, Joseph Lee Jr., helped establish the Massachusetts Committee to Further Outdoor Recreation and the Boston Board of Recreation and served as chairman of the Boston Park Commission and Boston School Committee.

Lee founded the Massachusetts Civic League and served as its president from 1897 to 1937. He was an active officer in the Immigration Restriction League from 1905 until his death in 1937. He served as president of the National Recreation Association from 1910 until the time of his death.

"For the one political cause to which this friend of the common man [Lee] devoted the most time, money and sheer fervor for more than twenty years was the movement to restrict immigration." Lee was the primary financial underwriter for the Immigration Restriction League, which conducted meetings regularly at his home. Lee "feared that 'all Europe might soon be 'drained of Jew--to its benefit no doubt but not ours.' And in a letter to one of his closest associates he declared that the Catholic Church is a great evil'; revealed his fear that the United States might 'become a Dago nation'; and needed only six words to explain the necessary preventive strategy: 'I believe in exclusion by race.'" He paid the salary of James H. Patten, a League lobbyist who believed in supporting the so-called Teutonic race. Lee also was in direct contact with his cousin, Henry Cabot Lodge, the senator from Massachusetts, to propose literary tests and additional fees to restrict immigration. In the effort to pass the Emergency Quota Act of 1921, Lee wrote to Lodge, "I don't know why we shouldn't discriminate, but if it is a sin, I think the proper thing would be to suspend all immigration."

Lee's anti-immigration activism was linked with his campaigns for playgrounds. In the view of the Playground Association of America, an organization of which Lee was president from 1910 to 1937, promoting play for children of immigrants was a way to make them more American. However, as an immigration restrictionist, Lee sometimes opposed assimilation of immigrants in favor of excluding them entirely.

During the first World War he served as president of the War Camp Community Service for the U.S. Army. For this service he was decorated with the Distinguished Service Medal (U.S. Army) in 1919.

Lee was among the first recipients of the Boy Scouts of America Silver Buffalo Award in 1926.

Lee died on July 28, 1937, at his vacation home in Cohasset, Massachusetts.

== Works cited ==
- Chase, Allan (1980). The Legacy of Malthus: The Social Costs of the New Scientific Racism. University of Illinois Press. ISBN 0-252-00790-5. OCLC 5564520.
- Mallach, Stanley (1986). "Lee, Joseph". In Trattner, Walter I. (ed.). Biographical Dictionary of Social Welfare in America. Greenwood Press. pp. 481–484. ISBN 0-313-23001-3. OCLC 12053141.
- Mobily, Kenneth E. (March 15, 2021). "Immigration Restriction, 'Americanization' and the Playground Movement". Annals of Leisure Research. 24 (2): 228–248. doi:10.1080/11745398.2019.1683460. ISSN 1174-5398. S2CID 211418049.
- Okrent, Daniel (May 7, 2019). The Guarded Gate: Bigotry, Eugenics and the Law That Kept Two Generations of Jews, Italians, and Other European Immigrants Out of America. Simon & Schuster. ISBN 978-1-4767-9803-5.
- Solomon, Barbara Miller (1989). Ancestors and Immigrants: A Changing New England Tradition. Northeastern University Press. ISBN 1-55553-067-2. OCLC 20295799.
