= Peter F. Hines =

American politician

Peter Francis Hines (November 30, 1927 – October 9, 1984) was an American attorney and politician who served on the Boston City Council from 1958 to 1968. He was the council president in 1963.

Hines joined the council in 1958 after the resignation of Edward J. McCormack, Jr., who was appointed Massachusetts Attorney General.

In 1964, Hines ran as a Write-in candidate for the Democratic nomination for Massachusetts State Auditor after the death of incumbent Auditor and Presumptive nominee Thomas J. Buckley. He did not receive enough votes to win the nomination and competed for the nomination at a special session of the State Democratic Committee. He finished in fourth place behind Thaddeus M. Buczko, John J. Buckley, and Louise Day Hicks.

In 1967, Hines ran for Mayor of Boston. He finished in ninth place with 0.70% of the vote.

== Personal life ==
Hines' father, Col. Paul H. Hines (orig. South Boston, MA), was a highly decorated U.S. Army veteran of World War I where he earned multiple citations for his service in Europe, most notably the Distinguished Service Cross (U.S.) and Croix de Guerre (France). He served as state representative and as an aide to Mayor John Hynes and was known for his work in establishing the Festival of Lights holiday celebration on the Boston Common which continues to this day. His mother, Margaret Galvin Hines, was a reporter for The Boston Post, founded by her father.

Hines and wife Dorothy (Hicks, orig. Malden, MA) raised four children in the same Holy Name Parish, West Roxbury, in which the Hines grew up. He is interred at Saint Joseph's Cemetery in West Roxbury, having died from stomach cancer in 1984 at the age of 56. He was a graduate of Boston College and Boston College Law School. Dorothy Hines is a graduate of Emmanuel College and pursued a long and successful career as an editor (Little Brown & Co., Parkway Transcript) and public relations/communications professional (St. Elizabeth's Hospital, New England Financial, Fidelity Investments).

Shortly after the conclusion of WW2, Hines served in the U.S. Army in Japan where he was a newspaper reporter for the U.S. Army's "Stars and Stripes." He was a passionate fan of the arts, opera music, history and literature.

Hines children are Peter Francis (1964), Elizabeth Mary (1966), Douglas Patrick (1967) and Matthew Damien (1973). Peter (Lexington, MA) works in the restaurant business in Boston for Starwood and is a graduate of the University of PA (MA, Fine Arts); Elizabeth (Roslindale, MA) works in the nonprofit industry and is a graduate of Williams College (BA, English Literature, Summa Cum Laude, Phi Beta Kappa) and Oxford University, UK (MA, English Literature); Douglas (Cincinnati, OH) is a sales executive with Fidelity Investments, and is a graduate of Hamilton College (BA, Political Science); Matthew (San Mateo, CA) is a silicon valley marketing professional and former online technology journalist (CNET News.com, IDG, Dow Jones & Co.) and is a graduate of Saint Michael's College (BA, English Literature). Like their father, each of the Hines siblings attended and graduated from Boston Latin School. There are 14 Hines grandchildren among the siblings.

Hines' nephew, Peter Blute, represented Massachusetts's 3rd congressional district in the United States House of Representatives from 1993 to 1997. His niece, Paula Ebben, is a news anchor for WBZ-TV.
