= Restore Our Alienated Rights =

Boston organization formed to oppose desegregation busing

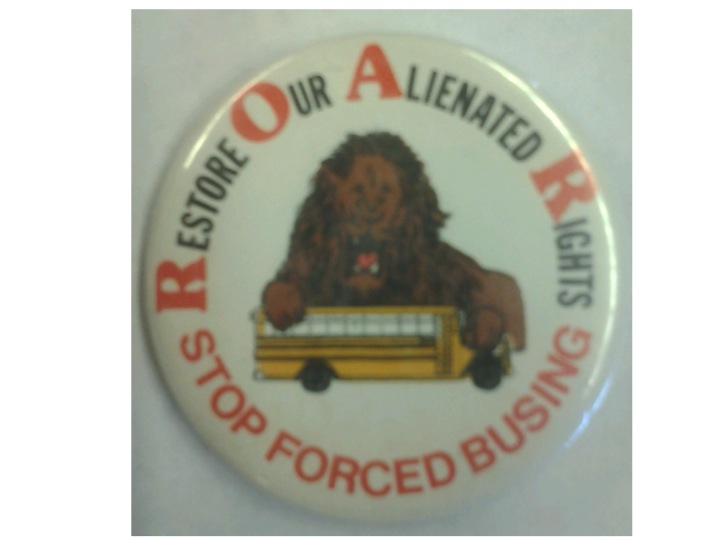
R.O.A.R. Pin

Restore Our Alienated Rights (ROAR) was an organization formed in Boston, Massachusetts by Louise Day Hicks in 1974. Opposed to the desegregation of Boston's public school buses, the group protested the federally-mandated order to integrate Boston Public Schools by staging formal, sometimes violent protests. It remained active from 1974 until 1976.

== Background ==
Many citizens felt the racial imbalance in Boston needed to be improved. The African-Americans of Boston had been fighting for equality in black and white public schools for decades before the creation of the Racial Imbalance Act or the formation of ROAR. Due to the inherent segregation within Boston, many schools were composed of either majority white or majority black students. This led to the white schools receiving more funding per student and having newer educational resources while black schools were receiving statistically much less funding and were typically of inferior quality than schools in primarily white districts.

One of the members of the Boston School Committee, Louise Day Hicks, was to become the founder of ROAR. The committee itself denied any accusations of inequity amongst white and black students. Hicks spoke outwardly against the desegregation of schools. The NAACP was not willing to let this segregation continue and filed a lawsuit against the Boston School Committee; this was the beginning of the Tallulah Morgan v. James Hennigan case which would eventually bring about forced busing. On June 21, 1974, Judge Garrity ruled that the committee was to create a plan to desegregate their schools. When the committee failed to provide such an idea, the federal court became involved. By federal decision, students were to be bused to schools in different districts to decrease the level of inequal education students were receiving.

Those who opposed the forced busing, which happened to be the majority of whites, especially mothers, in Boston, retaliated with protests. They eventually organized to create ROAR. While some of their concerns were legitimate, the organization was ultimately pro-segregation of schools. Not all members were definitive racists, but there was a connection between the group and racism as some of the members spoke outwardly against blacks. Initially a small group of females, they quickly gained local popularity as many locals shared their opinions. The act of forced busing was seen as a populist movement that potentially threatened the traditional values that the women of ROAR held. The fusing of mainly African-American and white districts could dissipate the borders between two very different neighborhoods that held different values, leading to certain groups feeling alienated.

== Founding ==
Louise Day-Hicks created "Save Boston Committee" in February 1974 with an agenda to restore "the custodial rights of parents over their children". She believed it was unfair for the government to force all public schools to desegregate, claiming it was neither a viable nor a beneficial way to improve American society and education. The group was later renamed ROAR to oppose the Racial Imbalance Act in 1974. The busing change in their eyes was "a total disaster". Hicks changed the name by the summer to ROAR. She used her position as a mother to rally others into her cause, arguing that the government needed to take a different approach if they wanted a stable nation. Some Americans, namely white mothers believed they were righteous in their cause and that they just wanted to keep the school environment running properly as much as possible.

== Purpose ==
The group's purpose was to fight off U.S. Federal Judge W. Arthur Garrity's court order requiring the city of Boston to implement desegregation busing — an order intended to eliminate de facto racial segregation in its public schools. To supporters, ROAR's purpose was its namesake; i.e., to protect the "vanishing rights" of white citizens. To its many opponents, however, ROAR was a symbol of mass racism coalesced into a single organization. ROAR was composed primarily of women, and its leaders argued that "the issue of forced busing is a women's issue."

On April 3, 1974, the committee organized a 20,000 person march from Boston City Hall Plaza to the State House. On March 19, 1975, 1,200 ROAR members marched in Washington DC to generate national support for their cause.

== Notable members ==
Louise Day Hicks, the founder of the organization, firmly opposed the racial integration of schools in Boston for ten years beforehand. Her office served as the headquarters for ROAR, she led a majority of protests, and she responded to all letters addressed to ROAR. Once a fight between Hicks and fellow member Pixie Palladino broke out, members' trust in Hicks began to diminish.

Palladino was considered to be more radical than Hicks. In January 1975, Palladino and eighty ROAR women stormed into a governor's commission on the status of women, dressed in "Stop Forced Busing" T-shirts. On March 10, 1976, Palladino began to create her own group, "United ROAR", which catered to beliefs that were more moderate than those of Hicks.

Francesca Johnnene was one of ROAR's most influential members. Johnnene was mostly responsible for holding meetings at her house in Hyde Park, rounding up neighbors and community members. Johnnene was also involved with the less radical anti-busing group, the Massachusetts Citizens Against Forced Busing, in February 1974. Towards the end of 1975, Johnnene left ROAR due to the increased radicalism.

A majority of the group's members were white Boston housewives, known as "militant mothers."

== Activities ==
There were instances of both violent and peaceful protest from the organization ROAR. During a protest, a wooden bus was burned as a representation of the forced busing policy. There were also occasions on which school children and parents alike pelted the buses coming from predominantly African-American areas. Protester signs often displayed racial slurs such as, 'Nigger Go Home,' and depicted monkeys. On December 11, 1974, at South Boston High, Michael Faith, a white student was stabbed by a black student by the name of James White. Hicks, present at the scene, attempted to calm the crowd, most of which belonging in ROAR. At that time, she prioritized the black students' safety on their way back home.

However, members also protested in peaceful ways. For example, in the time immediately following the desegregation, majority of white children did not attend school in both the formerly African-American schools and historically white schools. They reenacted the Boston Massacre to symbolize their empathy with the oppressed inhabitants of colonial America. On April 3, 1974, over 20,000 ROAR protesters marched on the State House to show their distaste for desegregation busing. On March 19, 1975, 1,200 members of ROAR marched on Washington DC to gain national recognition for their cause and possibly an amendment placed into the constitution that would make desegregation busing illegal.

== Societal response ==
By the year 1975, ROAR shifts its focus from busing to feminine issues, including participating in the signing for the year 1975 to be known as "International Women's Year." At that point, the forced busing act was seen more as an attack on women, specifically mothers. ROAR however remained ignored by the government, but continued to protest fervently. Though the media particularly the Boston Globe, often portrayed the group as racist, ROAR leader Virginia Sheehy states that their issues are mainly class-based. Sheehy argued by stating that she initially worked alongside black women in the Home and School Association prior to the forced busing issue. On the other hand, The Real Paper, a local newspaper company stated that the ROAR group is truly fighting for their traditional values. Overall, ROAR helped to consolidate the conservatism movement in the following year.

== See also ==
- Civil Rights Movement
- Desegregation busing in the United States
- Boston busing crisis
- Louise Day Hicks
