= 1967 Boston mayoral election =

Election in Massachusetts, United States

- November 7, 1967
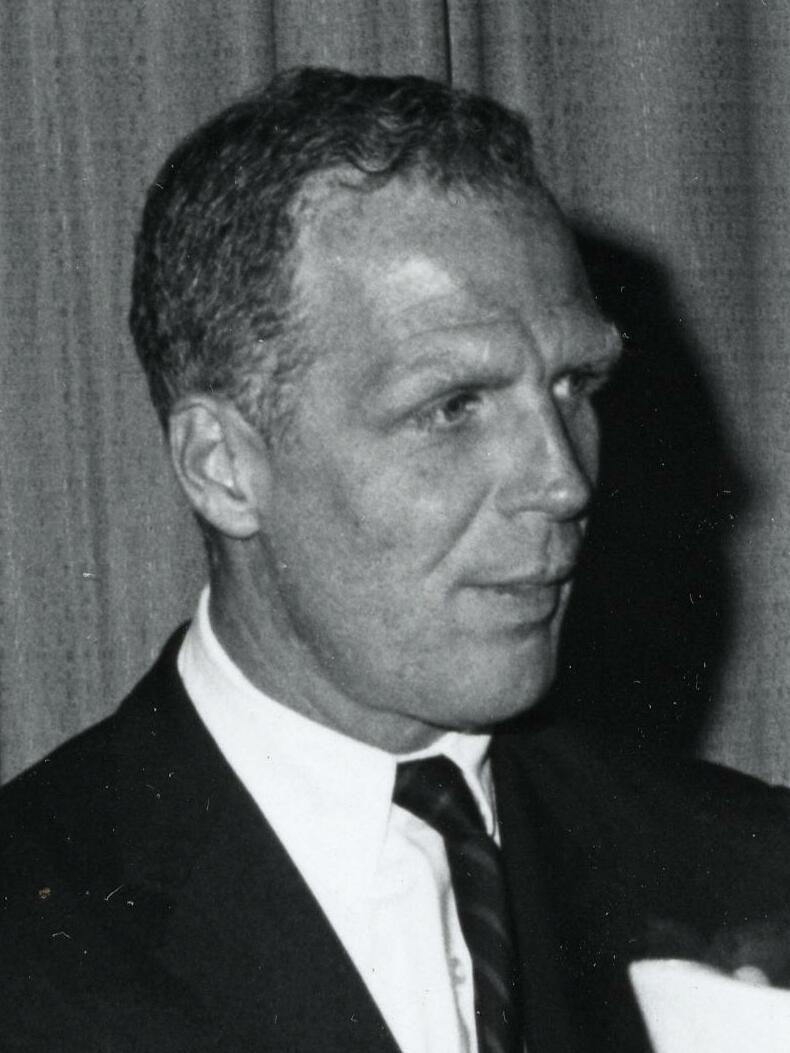

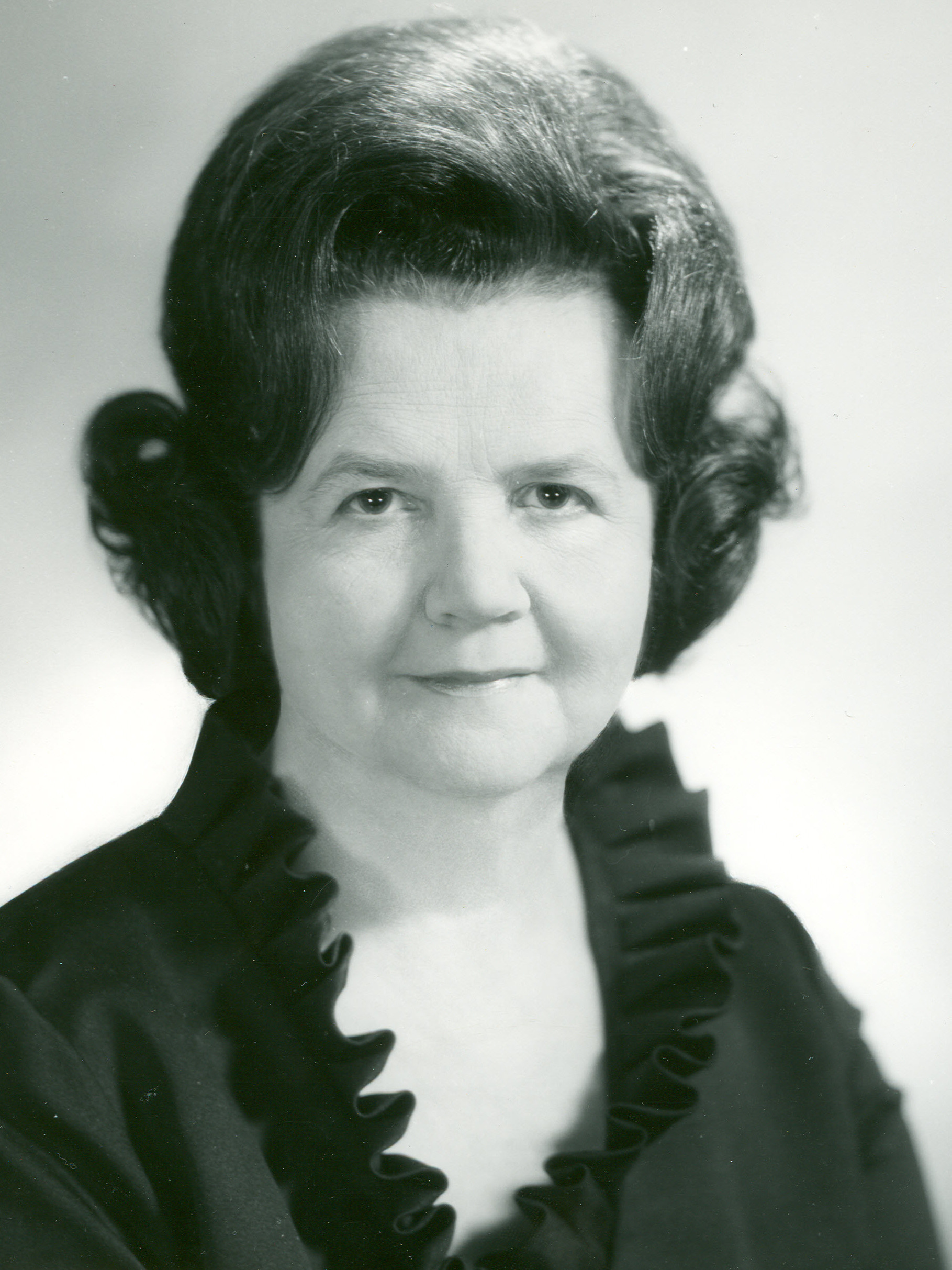
Candidate	Kevin White	Louise Day Hicks
Party	Nonpartisan	Nonpartisan
Popular vote	102,706	90,154
Percentage	53.25%	46.75%
- Results by ward White: 50–60% 60–70% 70–80% 80–90% >90% Hicks: 50–60% 70–80%
Mayor before election
John F. Collins
Elected mayor
Kevin White

The Boston mayoral election of 1967 occurred on Tuesday, November 7, 1967, between Secretary of the Commonwealth Kevin White and Boston School Committee member Louise Day Hicks. White was elected to his first term, and inaugurated on Monday, January 1, 1968.

The nonpartisan municipal preliminary election was held on Tuesday, September 26, 1967.

Hicks' victory in the preliminary election made her the first woman to be a finalist for mayor in city history.

== Candidates ==
- Louise Day Hicks, member of the Boston School Committee since 1961.
- Kevin White, Massachusetts Secretary of the Commonwealth since 1961.

=== Candidates eliminated in preliminary ===
- Nicholas Abraham, West Roxbury businessman.
- Stephen Davenport, member of the Massachusetts Senate since 1965, member of the Massachusetts House of Representatives from 1961 to 1965.
- Peter F. Hines, member of the Boston City Council since 1958, council president in 1963.
- Christopher A. Iannella, member of the Boston City Council since 1958, council president in 1962.
- Edward J. Logue, former Director of the Boston Redevelopment Authority.
- John J. McDonough, member of the Boston School Committee.
- Albert L. O'Neil, member of the Boston Licensing Board.
- John W. Sears, member of the Massachusetts House of Representatives since 1965.

=== Dropped out ===
- Barry T. Hynes, President of the Boston City Council
- Charles Iannello, state representative

== Results ==
Candidates	Preliminary Election		General Election	
Candidates	Votes	%	Votes	%
Kevin White	30,789	19.83	102,706	53.25
Louise Day Hicks	43,722	28.16	90,154	46.75
John W. Sears	23,924	15.41		
Edward J. Logue	23,766	15.31		
Christopher A. Iannella	18,343	11.82		
Stephen Davenport	9,016	5.81		
Nicholas Abraham	2,295	1.48		
Albert L. O'Neil	1,471	0.95		
Peter F. Hines	1,091	0.70		
John J. McDonough	830	0.54		

== See also ==
- List of mayors of Boston, Massachusetts
