= Joseph Lee (American politician) =

American politician

Chairman of the Boston School Committee
- In office 1970
- Preceded by: John J. Kerrigan
- Succeeded by: Paul Tierney
- In office 1962
- Preceded by: Madeleine Reilly
- Succeeded by: Louise Day Hicks
- In office 1956
- Preceded by: Mary K. Fitzgerald
- Succeeded by: John P. McMorrow

Personal details
- Born: 1901 Boston
- Died: November 6, 1991 (aged 90) Boston
- Party: Democratic Party
- Spouse(s): Kathleen Nolan (?-1951; her death); Ariel Foley Duff (1960-1991; his death)
- Parent: Joseph Lee (father)
- Education: Harvard College

Joseph Lee (1901-1991) was an American politician who served ten terms on the Boston School Committee.

== Early life ==
Lee was born in 1901 in Boston. His father, Joseph Lee, was a recreation advocate and Boston School Committee member known as the "father of the American playground". His grandfather, was a founder of Lee, Higginson & Co. He graduated from Harvard College in 1922 and then attended the University of Texas. After graduating, Lee worked on a ranch in Wyoming, the Fore River Shipyard in Massachusetts, and was a reporter for the Boston Post. He also worked for fourteen years as a freelance writer. During World War I he served in the United States Marines.

== Political career ==
=== Early school committee years ===
In 1937, Lee was elected to the Boston School Committee. He was reelected in 1939. During his first stint on the committee, Lee was credited with introducing 7th, 8th and 9th grade economics courses. He attempted to eliminate Latin and foreign language courses, stating that "only modern language of today is the language of economics." In 1940, he stated that a proposed pay increase for female teachers would "encourage birth control and race suicide."

=== Unsuccessful bids for higher office ===
In 1940, Lee ran for a seat on the Massachusetts Governor's Council, but lost the Democratic primary to Daniel H. Coakley. In 1941, he ran for Mayor of Boston. He finished a distant third behind incumbent Maurice J. Tobin and former Mayor James Michael Curley, but ahead of another former Mayor, Malcolm E. Nichols. In 1942 Lee lost the Democratic primary for the United States Senate seat held by Henry Cabot Lodge Jr. He finished third in the Democratic primary behind Joseph E. Casey and John F. Fitzgerald, but ahead of Coakley. Lodge resigned in 1944, and Lee ran in the special election. He finished second in the Democratic primary with 26% to John H. Corcoran's 34%. In 1945, Lee once again an unsuccessful candidate for Mayor of Boston. The following year he lost his bid for the United States House of Representatives seat in Massachusetts' 11th Congressional district.

=== Recreation advocacy ===
Lee also fought for increased recreational activities for both adults and children. He campaigned for public skating on the Charles River and Jamaica Pond. He helped establish the Massachusetts Committee to Further Outdoor Recreation and the Boston Board of Recreation. During the 1940s he served as chairman of the Boston Park Commission.

=== Later school committee tenure ===
In 1953, Lee was once again elected to the Boston School Committee. He was reelected in 1955. In 1956 he was elected committee chairman. He lost in 1957, but returned in 1959 for the first of six consecutive terms. In 1962 and 1970 he was the committee chairman. He lost his bid for reelection in 1971, following an effort by the Boston Teachers Union to unseat him.

== Personal life and death ==
Lee's first wife, Kathleen Nolan, died in 1951. In May 1960, Lee, then 59, married Ariel Foley Duff, a 26-year old widow.

Lee died on November 6, 1991, at a nursing home in Jamaica Plain.
