= Stephen Davenport =

American politician (1924–2011)

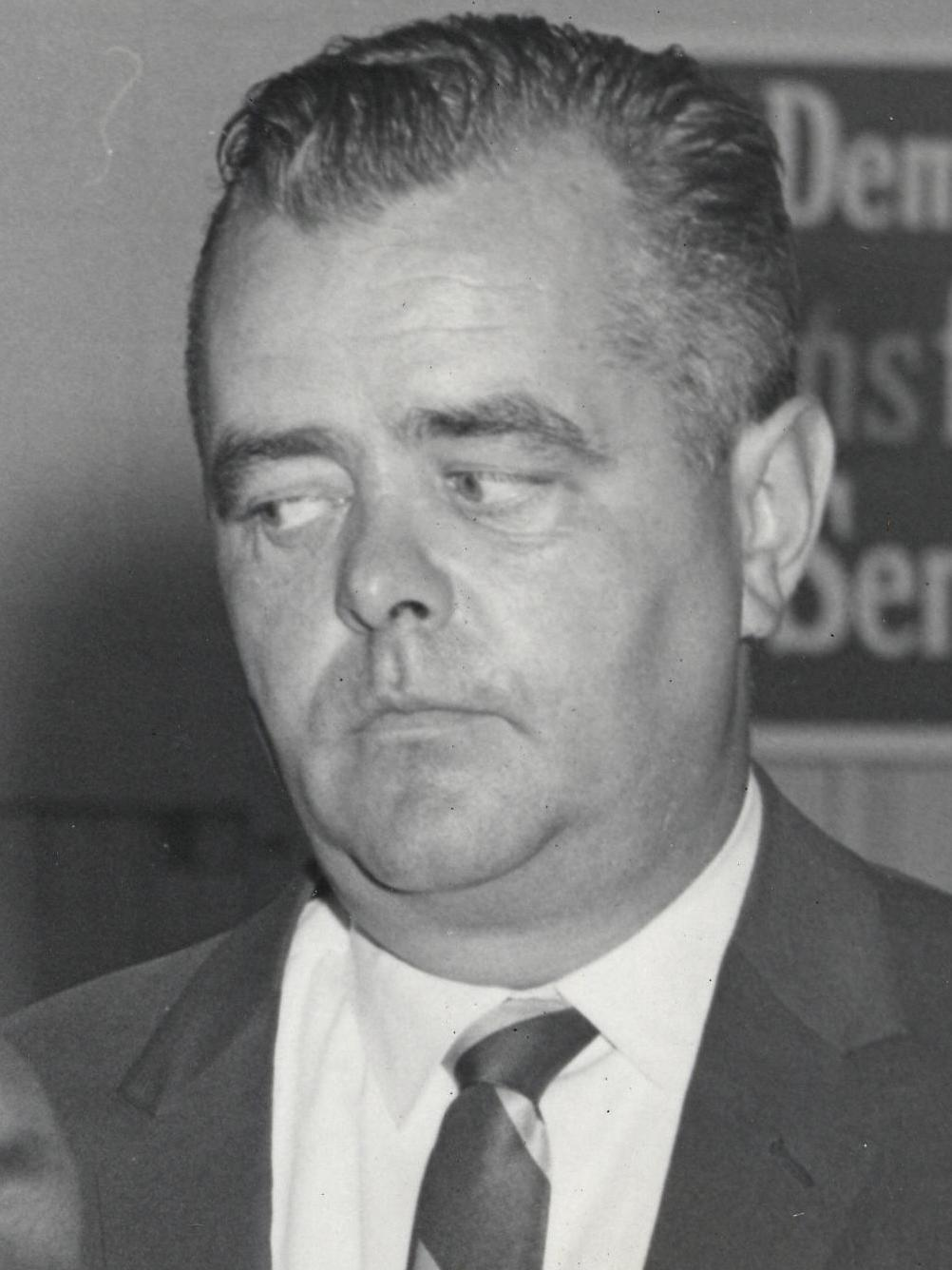
- Davenport in 1966

Member of the Massachusetts Senate from the 5th Suffolk district
- In office 1965–1969
- Preceded by: James W. Hennigan, Jr.
- Succeeded by: Robert Cawley

Member of the Massachusetts House of Representatives from the 18th Suffolk district
- In office 1961–1965
- Preceded by: John W. Costello
- Succeeded by: Raymond Carey

Personal details
- Born: June 27, 1924 Boston, Massachusetts
- Died: August 17, 2011 (aged 87) Wellesley, Massachusetts
- Party: Democratic
- Education: Boston University School of Business; Boston University School of Law; Bentley School of Accounting and Finance
- Occupation: Lawyer; Certified Public Accountant; Politician

Stephen C. Davenport (June 27, 1924 – August 17, 2011) was an American lawyer, accountant, and politician who was a member of the Massachusetts Senate from 1965 to 1969 and the Massachusetts House of Representatives from 1961 to 1965. He was a candidate for Mayor of Boston in 1967. Prior to serving in the Massachusetts General Court, Davenport served as Assistant Corporation Counsel for the City of Boston from 1950 to 1961.

He was born in Roslindale, Massachusetts, and represented Jamaica Plain for most of his career. He served as a Navy jet fighter in World War II and the Korean War. He was married to Margaret "Margie" (Kane) Davenport and had one daughter and two sons. He died in August 2011.
