= Louise Day Hicks =

American politician and lawyer (1916–2003)

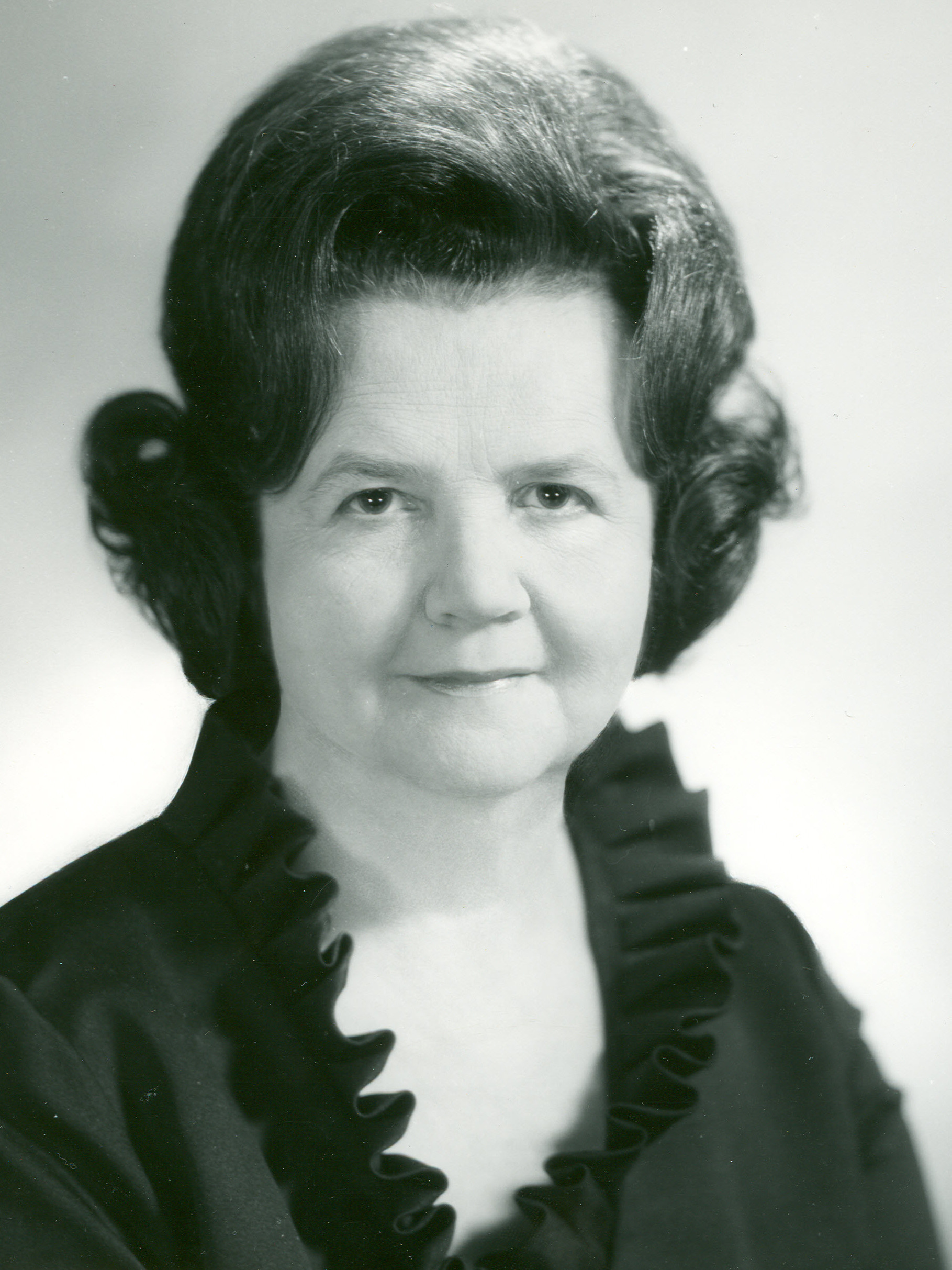
- Hicks c. 1969

Member of the U.S. House of Representatives from Massachusetts's 9th district
- In office January 3, 1971 – January 3, 1973
- Preceded by: John W. McCormack
- Succeeded by: Joe Moakley

President of the Boston City Council
- In office 1976
- Preceded by: Gerald O'Leary
- Succeeded by: Joseph M. Tierney

Member of the Boston City Council
- In office 1979–1981
- Preceded by: James Michael Connolly
- Succeeded by: John W. Sears
- In office 1974–1978
- In office 1970–1971
- Succeeded by: Dapper O'Neil

Chair of the Boston School Committee
- In office 1963–1965
- Preceded by: Joseph Lee
- Succeeded by: Thomas S. Eisenstadt

Member of the Boston School Committee
- In office 1961–1970

Personal details
- Born: Anna Louise Day; October 16, 1916 Boston, Massachusetts, U.S.
- Died: October 21, 2003 (aged 87) Boston, Massachusetts, U.S.
- Resting place: Saint Joseph Cemetery; West Roxbury, Massachusetts, U.S.
- Party: Democratic
- Spouse: John Hicks
- Parent(s): William J. Day; Anna (née McCarron) Day
- Education: Wheelock College (B.A., Education); Boston University (B.S., 1952; J.D., 1955)

Anna Louise Day Hicks (October 16, 1916 – October 21, 2003) was an American politician and lawyer from Boston, Massachusetts, best known for her staunch opposition to desegregation in Boston public schools, and especially to court-ordered busing, in the 1960s and 1970s. A longtime member of Boston's school board and city council, she served one term in the United States House of Representatives, succeeding Speaker of the House John W. McCormack.

The daughter of a wealthy and prominent attorney and judge, Hicks attended Simmons College and received her qualification as a teacher from Wheelock College. She worked as a first-grade teacher prior to marrying in 1942. After the births of her two children, Hicks returned to school and completed a Bachelor of Science degree at Boston University in 1952. In 1955, she received a JD from Boston University Law School, attained admission to the bar, and entered into partnership with her brother as the firm of Hicks and Day.

In 1960, Hicks won election to Boston's school board, where she served until 1970, including holding the position of chairwoman from 1963 to 1965. During her tenure on the school committee, she came into conflict with civil rights groups and black residents of Boston over her opposition to plans to integrate schools by busing students between districts to achieve racial balance. In addition, for 114 days in the summer of 1965, the Reverend Vernon Carter, pastor of All Saints Lutheran Church in the Southend of Boston protested in front of the school committee building in which Hicks entered and exited frequently. In 1967, she ran unsuccessfully for mayor of Boston. From 1970 to 1971, she served on the Boston City Council. In 1970, she won the Democratic nomination for the U.S. House seat of the retiring John McCormack. She went on to win the general election and serve one term, 1971 to 1973. In 1971, she was an unsuccessful candidate for mayor of Boston. She was defeated for reelection to Congress in 1972 by Joe Moakley, a Democrat who ran as an independent.

After leaving Congress, Hicks was the head of an anti-busing group, "Restore Our Alienated Rights" (ROAR), which remained active until a 1976 federal court decision mandated busing to achieve integration in public schools. In 1974, Hicks returned to the Boston City Council, and she served until 1978, including holding the council president's position in 1976. She lost reelection in 1977, but was appointed to fill a vacancy in 1979. She served until 1981, and was an unsuccessful candidate for reelection. Hicks died in Boston in 2003.

== Early life ==
Hicks was the daughter of William J. Day and Anna (née McCarron) Day. Hicks described her father, a lawyer and an influential judge in Boston, as her "greatest influence". The child of poor Irish immigrants, William Day became one of the wealthiest men in South Boston as a result of his law practice, real estate investments and his role as director of South Boston's Mount Washington Cooperative Bank. Day was admired by Boston's Irish community; as a banker he provided assistance to families struggling to make mortgage payments and as a judge he was particularly lenient towards juvenile defendants. In her own political career, Hicks would benefit from her father's reputation.

Hicks' mother died when Hicks was fourteen. In 1942, she married John Hicks, an engineer, and they had two sons, John and William. John Edward Hicks (b. 1945) had several brushes with the law, including a prison sentence for kidnapping. He disappeared in 1978, while he was facing more than 20 charges related to a 1977 incident in which he threatened harm to several customers inside a restaurant and then attempted to run over several of them in the parking lot. John Hicks was still missing at the time of his mother's death.

Hicks studied home economics at Simmons College and then later earned a teaching certificate at Wheelock College. She taught first grade in Brookline, Massachusetts, for two years and pursued a degree in education at Boston University.

Hicks earned a Bachelor of Science degree from BU in 1952, and a JD from Boston University Law School in 1955. Hicks stated that her father's death in 1950 left her resolved to follow in his footsteps. At the time, female law students were still rare; Hicks was one of only nine women in her class of 232. Hicks formed close friendships with two other female students, one Jewish and one black, and she studied for exams with a group made up of mostly minorities. Hicks was admitted to the bar and practiced law with her brother John as the firm of Hicks and Day.

== De facto segregation ==
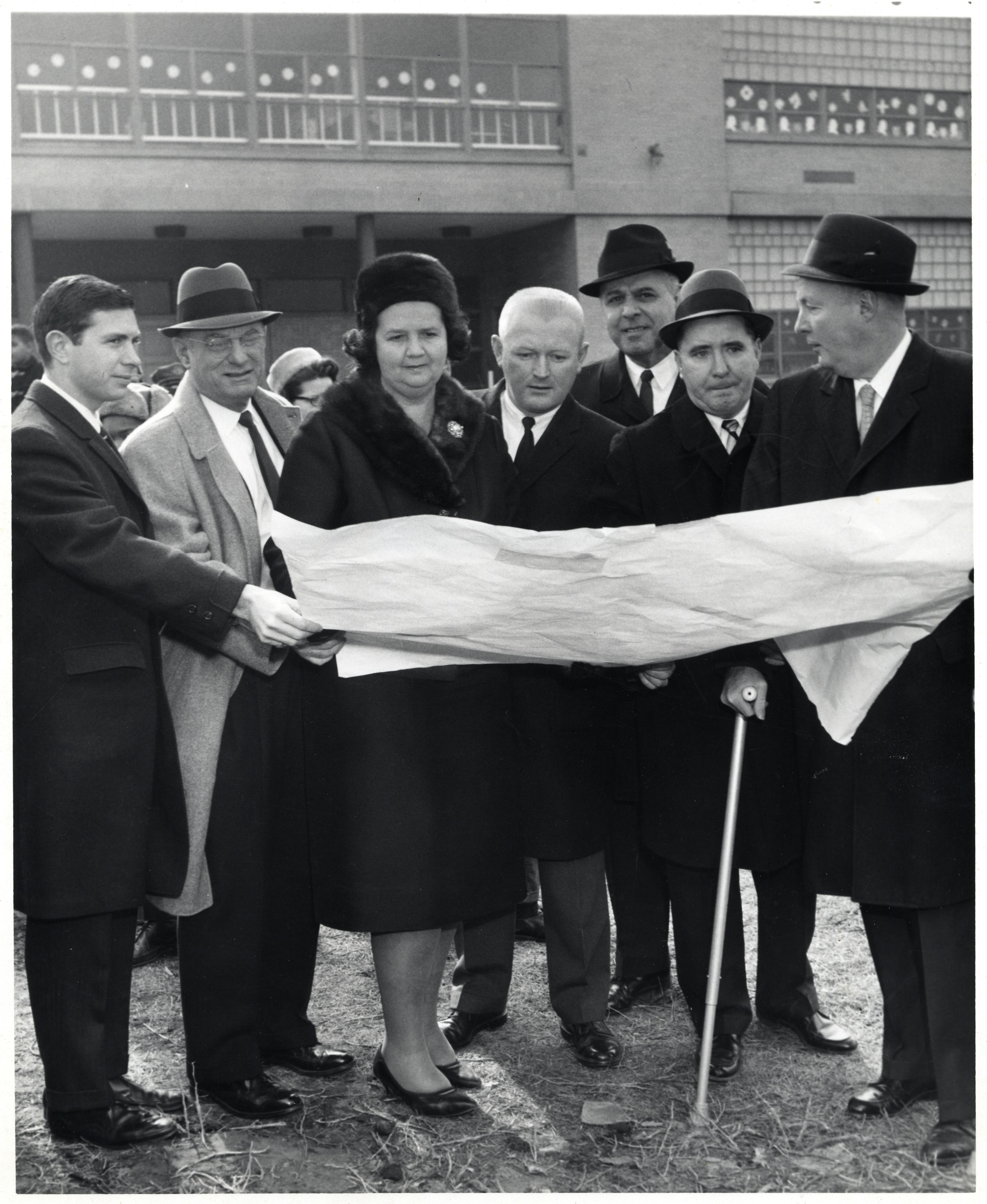
Hicks (third from left) with a group of men, including mayor John F. Collins (far right) in the 1960s

Hicks ran successfully for the Boston School Committee in 1961, presenting herself as a reform candidate. Her campaign slogan was "The only mother on the ballot", which was factually true, although her own children were not enrolled in any public schools. In January 1963, she became the committee chairperson and seemed likely to be endorsed by the leading reform group when, in June, the Boston chapter of the NAACP demanded "an immediate public acknowledgment of de facto segregation in the Boston public school system." At the time, 13 city schools were at least 90% black.

The committee refused to acknowledge the segregation. Hicks was recognized as the holdout; within months she became Boston's most popular politician and the most controversial, requiring police bodyguards 24 hours a day. Hicks became nationally known in 1965 when she opposed court-ordered busing of students into inner-city schools to achieve integration.

From its creation under the National Housing Act of 1934 signed into law by President Franklin D. Roosevelt, the Federal Housing Administration used its official mortgage insurance underwriting policy explicitly to prevent school desegregation. In 1963, Boston Mayor John F. Collins and Boston Redevelopment Authority (BRA) executive Edward J. Logue organized a consortium of savings banks, cooperatives, and federal and state savings and loan associations in the city called the Boston Banks Urban Renewal Group (B-BURG) that would reverse redline parts of Dorchester, Roxbury, and Mattapan along Blue Hill Avenue during the administration of Kevin White.

Despite the passage of legislation by the 156th Massachusetts General Court banning racial discrimination or segregation in housing in 1950, as well as the issuance of Executive Order 11063 by President John F. Kennedy in 1962 requiring all federal agencies to prevent racial discrimination in all federally-funded subsidized housing in the United States, the Boston Housing Authority (BHA) Board actively segregated the public housing developments in the city during the Collins administration as well, with BHA departments engaging in bureaucratic resistance against integration through at least 1966 and the Board retaining control over tenant assignment until 1968.

On April 1, 1965, a special committee appointed by Massachusetts Education Commissioner Owen Kiernan released its final report finding that more than half of black students enrolled in Boston Public Schools (BPS) attended institutions with enrollments that were at least 80% black and that housing segregation in the city had caused the racial imbalance. Massachusetts Governor John Volpe filed a request for legislation from the state legislature that defined schools with nonwhite enrollments greater than 50 percent to be imbalanced and granted the State Board of Education the power to withhold state funds from any school district in the state that was found to have racial imbalance, which Volpe would sign into law the following August.

By refusing to admit that segregation existed in city schools and by declaring that children were the "pawns" of racial politics, she came to personify the discord that existed between some working class Irish Americans and African Americans. "Boston schools are a scapegoat for those who have failed to solve the housing, economic, and social problems of the black citizen", Hicks said. She asserted that, while thirteen Boston schools were at least 90% black, Chinatown schools were 100% Chinese, the North End had schools that were 100% Italian American, and South Boston contained schools that were mostly Irish American. The Boston public schools included a conglomerate of white ethnics with very few WASPs.

Following the passage of the Racial Imbalance Act, Governor Volpe, Mayor Collins, and BPS Superintendent William H. Ohrenberger, opposed and warned the Boston School Committee that a vote that they held that same month to abandon a proposal to bus several hundred blacks students from Roxbury and North Dorchester from three overcrowded schools to nearby schools in Dorchester and Brighton, and purchase an abandoned Hebrew school in Dorchester to relieve the overcrowding instead, could now be held by a court to be deliberate acts of segregation. Pursuant to the Racial Imbalance Act, the state conducted a racial census and found 55 imbalanced schools in the state with 46 in Boston, and in October 1965, the State Board required the School Committee to submit a desegregation plan, which the School Committee did the following December.

In April 1966, the State Board found the plan inadequate and voted to rescind state aid to the district, and in response, the School Committee filed a lawsuit against the State Board challenging both the decision and the constitutionality of the Racial Imbalance Act the following August. In January 1967, Massachusetts Superior Court overturned a Suffolk Superior Court ruling that the State Board had improperly withdrawn the funds and ordered the School Committee to submit an acceptable plan to the State Board within 90 days or else permanently lose funding, which the School Committee did shortly thereafter and the State Board accepted. In June 1967, the Massachusetts Supreme Judicial Court upheld the constitutionality of the Racial Imbalance Act and the U.S. Supreme Court under Chief Justice Earl Warren (1953–1969) declined to hear the School Committee's appeal in January 1968.

== Mayoral bids, city council, and Congress ==
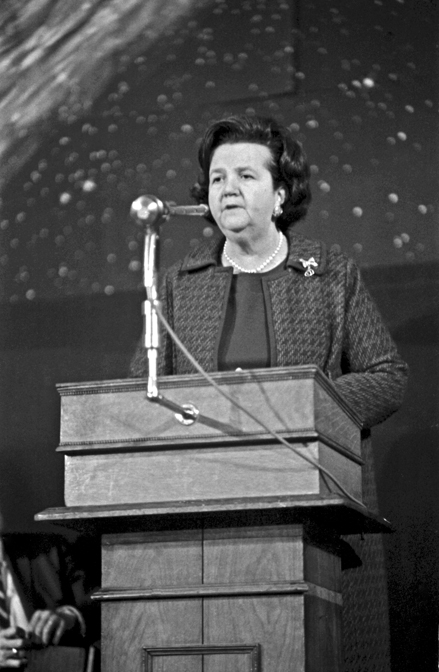
Louise Day Hicks as a candidate for the Boston City Council, 1969

In 1967, Hicks came within 12,000 votes of being elected mayor of Boston, running on the slogan, "You know where I stand." The nonpartisan race against fellow Democrat Kevin White became so acrimonious that the Boston Globe broke a 75-year tradition of political neutrality to endorse White. After the unsuccessful mayoral bid, Hicks ran for city council and won. Two years later, after Speaker John W. McCormack retired after 43 years in Congress, Hicks beat out eleven other candidates to win the Democratic primary for his South Boston congressional district. In heavily Democratic Boston, the winner of that primary was essentially assured victory in the November election.

Hicks served one term in the United States House of Representatives from 1971 to 1973, becoming the first female Democrat to represent Massachusetts in the House. Despite her identification with the white backlash, Hicks took many progressive stands in Congress. She was a member of the National Organization for Women and lobbied for passage of the Equal Rights Amendment while in Congress. She also won relatively high ratings from the League of Conservation Voters.

While in Congress Hicks ran again for Mayor of Boston in 1971. She made the runoff, but was again defeated by Kevin White, this time by a much wider margin. She sought reelection to Congress in 1972, but was narrowly defeated in the general election by City Councilman Joe Moakley, a more liberal Democrat who was running as an Independent. Moakley reverted to his Democratic party affiliation after he entered the House.

On May 25, 1971, the Massachusetts State Board of Education voted unanimously to withhold state aid from the Boston Public Schools due to the School Committee's refusal to use the district's open enrollment policy to relieve the city's racial imbalance in enrollments, instead routinely granting white students transfers while doing nothing to assist black students attempting to transfer. On March 15, 1972, the Boston NAACP filed a lawsuit, later named Morgan v. Hennigan, against the Boston School Committee in federal district court. In 1973, Hicks ran for the Boston City Council again and won. Her most notable campaign took place in autumn 1975, after a federal judge ordered Boston schools to expand their busing programs to comply with the 1971 Swann v. Charlotte-Mecklenburg Board of Education decision. To counter the trend, Hicks started an organization called Restore Our Alienated Rights (ROAR) which actively engaged in incidents of massive resistance to school desegregation. In 1976, Hicks was elected the first woman president of the Boston City Council, largely on the strength of ROAR, which was then at its peak. During this time Hicks supported another controversial position, a curfew for minors in the city of Boston.

During her political career, Hicks was excoriated by liberal politicians and activists. The columnist Joseph Alsop called her "Joe McCarthy dressed up as Pollyanna"; civil rights leaders likened her to Adolf Hitler or Bull Connor of Birmingham, Alabama. Newsweek published a satirical article ridiculing the Irish culture of South Boston, a matter which prompted Hicks to reply with a full-page newspaper ad. There were 223 murders in Boston from 1973 to 1974, but only two dozen involved blacks killing whites. Hicks claimed, however, that there were "at least one hundred black people walking around in the black community who have killed white people during the last two years." Hicks took aim at "radical agitators" and "pseudo-liberals" of the counterculture. She declared that "white women can no longer walk the streets [of Boston] in safety" and that "justice [had come] to mean special privileges for the black man and the criminal." She attacked "black militants [who] tyrannize our schools, creating chaos and disruption." Hicks opposed George Wallace of Alabama, who ran for U.S. President on four occasions: "He's a segregationist. I don't want to be connected to him." Hicks continued, "While a large part of my vote probably does come from bigoted people. ... I know I'm not bigoted. To me the word means all the dreadful southern segregationist, Jim Crow business that's always shocked and revolted me."

On June 21, 1974, Judge W. Arthur Garrity Jr. ruled in Morgan v. Hennigan that the open enrollment and controlled transfer policies that the School Committee created in 1961 and 1971 respectively were being used to effectively discriminate on the basis of race, and that the School Committee had maintained segregation in the Boston Public Schools by adding portable classrooms to overcrowded white schools instead of assigning white students to nearby underutilized black schools, while simultaneously purchasing closed white schools and busing black students past open white schools with vacant seats. In accordance with the Racial Imbalance Act, the School Committee would be required to bus 17,000 to 18,000 students the following September (Phase I) and to formulate a desegregation plan for the 1975–1976 school year by December 16 (Phase II).

On September 12, 1974, 79 of 80 schools were successfully bused (with South Boston High School being the lone exception), and through October 10, there were 149 arrests (40 percent occurring at South Boston High alone), 129 injuries, and $50,000 in property damage. On October 15, an interracial stabbing at Hyde Park High School led to a riot that injured 8, and at South Boston High on December 11, a non-fatal interracial stabbing led to a riotous crowd of 1,800 to 2,500 whites hurling projectiles at police while white students fled the facility and black students remained. Hicks, State Senator William Bulger, and State Representative Raymond Flynn made their way to the school, and Hicks spoke through a bullhorn to the crowd and urged them to allow the black students still in South Boston High to leave in peace to no avail. Decoy buses had to be sent in to the front of the school while the black children boarded other buses in the back of the school. While the police made only 3 arrests, the injured numbered 25 (including 14 police), and the rioters badly damaged 6 police vehicles.

Twenty minutes after Judge Garrity's deadline for submitting the Phase II plan expired on December 16, 1974, the School Committee voted to reject the desegregation plan proposed by the department's Educational Planning Center. On December 18, Garrity summoned all five Boston School Committee members to court, held three of the members to be in contempt of court on December 27, and told the members on December 30 that he would purge their contempt holdings if they voted to authorize submission of a Phase II plan by January 7. On January 7, 1975, the School Committee directed school department planners to file a voluntary-only busing proposal with the court.

On May 10, 1975, the Massachusetts U.S. District Court announced a Phase II plan requiring 24,000 students to be bused that was formulated by a four-member committee consisting of former Massachusetts Supreme Judicial Court Justice Jacob Spiegel, former U.S. Education Commissioner Francis Keppel, Harvard Graduate School of Education professor Charles V. Willie, and former Massachusetts Attorney General Edward J. McCormack that was formed by Judge Garrity the previous February. On December 9, Judge Garrity ruled that instead of closing South Boston High at the request of the plaintiffs in Morgan v. Hennigan, the school would be put into federal receivership. On June 14, 1976, the U.S. Supreme Court under Chief Justice Warren E. Burger (1969–1986) unanimously declined to review the School Committee's appeal of the Phase II plan. From September 1974 through the fall of 1976, at least 40 riots had occurred in the city.

== Retirement ==
She was defeated for reelection to the Boston City Council in 1977, finishing tenth in the race for nine positions. In 1979, Councilor James Michael Connolly was elected Register of Probate for Suffolk County and resigned from the council, and as 10th-place finisher in the 1979 election, Hicks filled the vacant seat only to lose again in 1981. Hicks began to experience health problems and retired from politics after that.

Despite the passage of the Community Reinvestment Act in 1977 banning redlining, the legislation was not seriously enforced by the U.S. Department of Housing and Urban Development (HUD) in the 1980s during the Reagan Administration while the Department itself was rife with corruption. From July 1977 through June 1978, 91 percent of the government-insured foreclosures in Boston were in Dorchester, Mattapan, and Roxbury, with 53 percent of the city's foreclosures in South Dorchester and Mattapan alone, and 84 percent of the 93 foreclosures in Dorchester were concentrated in B-BURG program census tracts. By the early 1990s, the overwhelming majority of Boston's 120,000 black residents lived in Dorchester, Roxbury, and Mattapan. In December 1982, Judge Garrity transferred responsibility for monitoring of compliance to the State Board for the subsequent two years, and in September 1985, Judge Garrity issued his final orders returning jurisdiction of the schools to the School Committee. In May 1990, Judge Garrity delivered his final judgment in Morgan v. Hennigan, formally closing the original case. Incidents of interracial violence in Boston would continue from November 1977 through at least 1993.

== Death and burial ==
Hicks died in Boston on October 21, 2003. She was buried at Saint Joseph Cemetery in West Roxbury, Massachusetts.

== See also ==
- Boston busing crisis
- Women in the United States House of Representatives

U.S. House of Representatives
Preceded by John W. McCormack	Member of the U.S. House of Representatives from Massachusetts's 9th congressional district 1971–1973	Succeeded by Joe Moakley
Political offices
Preceded by Gerald O'Leary	President of the Boston City Council; 1976	Succeeded by Joseph M. Tierney
