= John J. Craven Jr. =

American jurist and politician (1936–2011)

Member of the Massachusetts Governor's Council from the 2nd District
- In office 1967–1969
- Preceded by: Margaret Heckler
- Succeeded by: Herb Connolly

Personal details
- Born: February 27, 1936 Boston, Massachusetts, U.S.
- Died: November 22, 2011 (aged 75) Chestnut Hill, Massachusetts, U.S.
- Resting place: Mount Benedict Cemetery; West Roxbury, Massachusetts, U.S.
- Party: Democratic
- Spouse: Patricia McCarthy (m. 1970)
- Children: 3
- Education: Harvard College; Portia School of Law
- Occupation: Lawyer

John Joseph Craven Jr. (February 27, 1936 – November 22, 2011) was an American jurist and politician who was a member of the Massachusetts Governor's Council and Boston School Committee and a judge on the Boston Juvenile Court.

== Early life ==
Craven was born on February 27, 1936, in Boston. His parents, John J. and Katherine Craven, were both politicians. Craven graduated from Roxbury Latin School in 1952, Harvard College in 1956, and the Portia School of Law in 1962.

== Political career ==
Craven was an unsuccessful candidate for the Massachusetts Senate in 1964. From 1967 to 1969, he represented the 2nd district on the Massachusetts Governor's Council. He unsuccessfully ran for sheriff of Suffolk County rather than seeking reelection. In 1969, Craven was elected to the Boston School Committee. He was one of the committee's more conservative members and opposed efforts to desegregate the city's schools. In 1970, he sought the Democratic nomination for Lieutenant Governor of Massachusetts, but finished fifth out of five candidates with 8% of the vote. In 1971, he was an unsuccessful candidate for the Boston City Council.

In 1973, Craven was appointed clerk of the Boston Municipal Court for criminal business by Governor Francis Sargent. In 1982, he was appointed to a judgeship on the Boston Juvenile Court by Governor Edward J. King. He retired from the bench in 2005.

Craven died on November 22, 2011, in Chestnut Hill, Massachusetts, of complications of Lewy body dementia.
