= Chuck Sullivan =

American football executive (1942–2026)

Personal information
- Born: December 4, 1942; Silver Spring, Maryland, U.S.
- Died: February 2, 2026 (aged 83)

Career information
- College: Boston College; Boston College Law School; Harvard Law School

Career history
- New England Patriots (1964) Assistant publicity director; New England Patriots (1970–1988) Executive vice president

Charles William Sullivan (December 4, 1942 – February 2, 2026) was an American lawyer and sports executive who was the vice president of the New England Patriots of the National Football League and owned the team's stadium, Foxboro Stadium.

== Early life ==
Sullivan was the eldest son of Patriots' founder Billy Sullivan. While attending Boston College, Sullivan worked for the Patriots as assistant publicity director. He also dabbled in concert promotion, bringing Duke Ellington and The Kingston Trio to BC. After graduating from Boston College Law School, Sullivan spent two years in the United States Army during the Vietnam War as a captain. He spent one year at Fort Benning and one year in Thailand and helped organize Bob Hope's 1968 tour of Vietnam. After leaving the Army, Sullivan earned a Master of Laws degree from Harvard Law School.

== Legal career ==
After graduating from Harvard, Sullivan became an associate at Sullivan & Cromwell, where he worked on Ford Motor Company's defense in a federal antitrust lawsuit and represented First Boston for Bangor Punta in their legal battle with Chris-Craft Industries for control of Piper Aircraft. In 1971, Sullivan assisted the NFL in its defense against an antitrust suit filed by former Patriot quarterback Joe Kapp. He later worked for Edwards & Angell and was a partner in O'Melveny & Myers.

== Patriots ==
In 1970, Sullivan replaced Phil Fine on the Patriots board of directors after Fine resigned to head up the company building the team's new stadium. In 1977, Sullivan was elected chairman of the National Football League Management Council's executive committee.

=== Buyout of minority shareholders ===
After Billy Sullivan was ousted as team president in 1974, Chuck Sullivan aggressively worked to regain control of the team. He arranged for $5.3 million in loans from LaSalle Bank and Rhode Island Hospital Trust National Bank and executed a squeeze-out, which forced minority shareholders to sell their shares to the Sullivan family. In 1986, the Massachusetts Supreme Judicial Court ruled that the Sullivans' buyout of the Patriots' nonvoting shareholders was illegal. The usual remedy for such an illegal deal would be to rescind it, however it the Court found that it wouldn't be appropriate in this case because of the amount of time that had passed.

=== Dispute with Chuck Fairbanks ===
Contract squabbles between the Sullivan family and offensive linemen John Hannah and Leon Gray soured head coach Chuck Fairbanks on Chuck Sullivan, who had forced Fairbanks to renege on his proposed contracts with Hannah and Gray. In 1978, Fairbanks worked out a contract extension with Darryl Stingley, but after Stingley suffered paralysis following a violent hit in a preseason game, Chuck Sullivan reneged on the deal. Fairbanks resolved to leave the team after the season. Hours prior to the final regular season game, Sullivan suspended Fairbanks for breaking his contract by agreeing to become head coach for the University of Colorado. Fairbanks was reinstated a few days later, well ahead of their divisional round playoff game (and the franchise's first home playoff game), but the second-seeded Patriots were upset 31–14 by the Houston Oilers. The Patriots sued Fairbanks for breach of contract, but on April 2, 1979, a group of CU boosters bought out his contract, making it possible for him to leave New England.

=== Acquisition of Schaefer Stadium ===
In 1981, Sullivan purchased Schaefer Stadium from Stadium Realty Trust for $6.28 million after winning a proxy fight with SRT management, which sought to sell the stadium to Canadian businessman Nelson Skalbania. In 1983, the stadium was renamed Sullivan Stadium. That same year, Sullivan acquired a 10-year lease on Foxboro Raceway from owner Eddie Andelman.

=== Victory Tour ===
Sullivan's Stadium Management Corp. financed The Jacksons 1984 Victory Tour. Sullivan offered the Jacksons two-thirds of the tour's gross revenue against a guaranteed $40 million, promised the group 83.4% of gross potential ticket revenues, which was at least 25% more than the industry standard for the time, and guaranteed the Jacksons an advance of $36.6 million. He also had to pay the Jacksons' parents and Don King, who first announced the tour and then was reportedly pushed aside by Michael Jackson. The tour was expected to gross $70–80 million and Sullivan expected to make up to $13 million. He put Sullivan Stadium up as collateral for a $12.5 million loan to pay the first installment shortly before the tour started.

The tour sold what was then a record number of tickets. The opening shows were widely covered in the national media and sold out. By the later shows, the novelty had worn off and the shows were failing to sell out. Dates planned for Pittsburgh were cancelled and by early October, the time of the shows in Toronto's Exhibition Stadium, a total of 50,000 tickets had gone unsold. In late November, the shows at Sun Devil Stadium in Tempe, Arizona, were canceled. Officially the reason was that Jermaine was too sick with the flu to perform, but there was some speculation that slow ticket sales played a role as well. Sullivan was so short of cash he stopped payment on a $1.9 million check to the group after the Vancouver dates. Immediately afterwards, he suffered a minor heart attack, and left the hospital early to renegotiate with the Jacksons again, claiming losses of $5–6 million.

=== Financial difficulties ===
Estimates of SMC's losses on the Victory Tour ranged from $13 million to $30 million. Sullivan himself put the figure around $25 million ($7 million to $8 million on the tour and $18 million on a merchandising deal with Michael Jackson). In August 1985, The Boston Globe reported that the Sullivans were looking to sell the Patriots, Sullivan Stadium, and their lease on Foxboro Raceway due to the family's financial and legal problems.

In 1986, Foxboro Raceway president Joe Sullivan left the track after a dispute with Sullivan, who reportedly owed him around $170,000. Later that year, the Massachusetts Racing Commission denied Sullivan's request for 1987 race dates due to the "financial insolvency" of Sullivan's Commonwealth Sports Properties and issues with the facility. On February 16, 1987, the track's owners seized the facility after Sullivan defaulted on his lease. Three months later, foreclosure proceedings were started against Sullivan after he failed to make payments on a 60-acre parcel of land across from Sullivan Stadium.

In July 1987, The Boston Globe reported that the Sullivans were in $77.7 million in debt (the Patriots were in $33.4 million in debt, Stadium Management Corp. was $19.1 million in debt, Commonwealth Sports Properties was $7.75 million in debt, and Premier Properties was $6.4 million in debt). The Patriots had lost money despite making Super Bowl XX in 1986 and selling out all of its games at the highest ticket prices during the 1986 season. One month later, Kidde filed a lawsuit in the United States District Court for the Southern District of New York claiming that Sullivan was in default on $11.8 million he owed the company, which had guaranteed a $12 million loan he took out from the Bank of Nova Scotia.

On November 6, 1987, the Massachusetts Land Court ruled that Connecticut Bank and Trust could sell Sullivan Stadium at auction. CBT was the stadium's second mortgage holder and Sullivan had reportedly borrowed $9 million from CBT to help purchase the lease on Foxboro Raceway. On February 23, 1988, Stadium Management Corp. filed for Chapter 11 bankruptcy protection to prevent the auction. On July 13, 1988, United States bankruptcy court judge James N. Gabriel removed Sullivan from management of Sullivan Stadium and ruled that US Trustee Vivan Grieman should begin proceedings to find a trustee to oversee SMC. Robert Kraft outbid several competitors to buy the stadium out of bankruptcy court for $22 million.

On March 17, 1988, the National Football League created a four-man committee to sell the team or work out a deal to settle its $120 million in debts. On March 30, 1988, it was announced that the Sullivans had agreed to sell the Patriots to Paul Fireman and Fran Murray. The deal fell through, but that July, Sullivan negotiated the sale of the team to Victor Kiam.

== Post-Patriots ==
After leaving the Patriots, Sullivan practiced corporate law in New York City, ran an event management business, and consulted for Veritone, an artificial intelligence company.

In 1998, Sullivan's license to practice law in New York was suspended indefinitely after he informed officials investigating allegations that he failed to return or misappropriated $1.4 million in investor funds that he was too ill to complete their interviews. In 2001, Massachusetts bar officials placed him on inactive disability status, which prevented him from practicing in that state as well.

On April 5, 2002, the Securities and Exchange Commission accused Sullivan of taking part in a $52 million investment scam with Dreyfus Corporation fund director Martin Fife, Raymond James Financial broker Dennis Herula, and British citizen Michael Clarke. On November 7, 2006, Sullivan agreed to pay back $910,884 in profits, $402,961 in interest, and a civil penalty of $120,000 to settle the case.

Sullivan died on February 2, 2026, at the age of 83.
