= John W. Sears =

American politician (1930–2014)

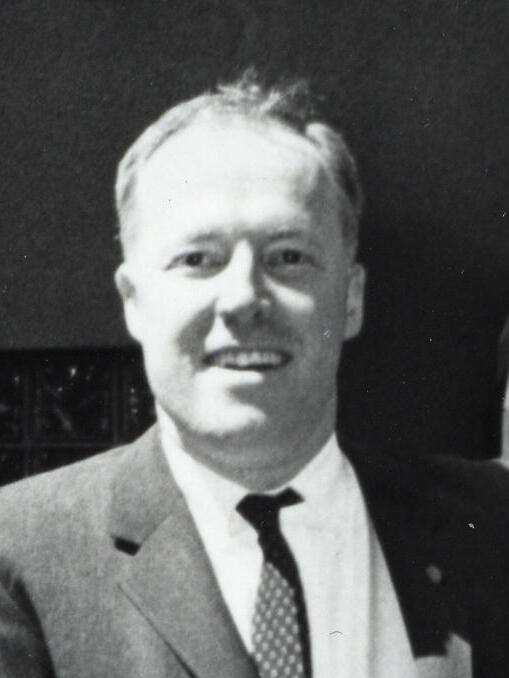
- Sears c. 1960s

Member of the Massachusetts House of Representatives from the 3rd Suffolk district
- In office 1965–1968
- Preceded by: Herbert B. Hollis
- Succeeded by: Joseph A. Langone III

Sheriff of Suffolk County
- In office 1968–1969
- Preceded by: Frederick R. Sullivan
- Succeeded by: Thomas Eisenstadt

Metropolitan District Commissioner
- In office 1970–1975
- Preceded by: Howard J. Whitmore, Jr.
- Succeeded by: John Snedeker

Member of the Boston City Council
- In office 1980–1982

Chairman of the Massachusetts Republican Party
- In office 1975–1976
- Preceded by: William Barnstead
- Succeeded by: Gordon M. Nelson

Personal details
- Born: John Winthrop Sears; December 18, 1930 Boston, Massachusetts, U.S.
- Died: November 4, 2014 (aged 83) Boston, Massachusetts, U.S.
- Party: Republican
- Education: Harvard University; Harvard Law School; University of Oxford
- Occupation: Lawyer; Stock broker

John Winthrop Sears (December 18, 1930 – November 4, 2014) was an American lawyer, historian and politician. His great-great-grandfather was David Sears II. He was the grandson of seven time National tennis champion Richard Dudley Sears and the first cousin once removed of Eleonora Sears. Sears was an alumnus of Dexter School, St. Mark's School and Harvard College during which he spent a year as a Rhodes Scholar at Oxford University, and Harvard Law School.

He served as a member of the Massachusetts House of Representatives from 1965 to 1968, Sheriff of Suffolk County, Massachusetts from 1968 to 1969. He was Metropolitan District Commissioner from 1970 to 1975, He was Chairman of the Massachusetts Republican Party from 1975 to 1976. He ran for municipal office and served as a Boston City Councilor from 1980 to 1981. He was a candidate for Mayor of Boston in 1967, Secretary of the Commonwealth in 1978. He was the Republican candidate for Governor of Massachusetts in 1982. Sears received one vote for the vice presidential nomination at the 1976 Republican National Convention.

In 2012 the longtime party activist defined himself as "an old-fashioned, center-fielding Republican." He died at his home in Boston on November 4, 2014.

Party political offices
| Preceded by John M. Quinlan | Republican nominee for Secretary of the Commonwealth of Massachusetts; 1978 | Succeeded by Jody DeRoma Dow |
| Preceded by Francis W. Hatch, Jr. | Massachusetts Republican Party gubernatorial candidate 1982 (lost) | Succeeded by George Kariotis |
