= Patrick Sullivan (American football executive) =

American football executive

Personal information
- Born: November 23, 1952 (age 73)

Career information
- College: Boston College

Career history
- New England Patriots (1977–1978) Stadium manager; New England Patriots (1979–1982) Assistant general manager; New England Patriots (1983–1991) General manager

Patrick Sullivan is a former American football executive who served as general manager of the New England Patriots from 1983 to 1990.

== Early life ==
The youngest of Patriots founder Billy Sullivan's six children, Sullivan was a ballboy for the first Boston Patriots team. He attended public school in Wellesley, Massachusetts and graduated from Browne & Nichols School in 1971 and Boston College in 1976.

== New England Patriots ==
After graduating college, Sullivan spent two years as the manager of Schaefer Stadium. In 1979, he was named assistant general manager. On February 17, 1983, Sullivan was promoted to general manager.

During his tenure as general manager, the Patriots had a 66–65 record and made the playoffs twice, including an appearance in Super Bowl XX.

After the Patriots 1985 Divisional Playoff victory against the Los Angeles Raiders, Sullivan was punched in the face by Raiders linebacker Matt Millen — who hit Sullivan in retaliation for his heckling of his Raiders teammate Howie Long from the sidelines.

After Boston Herald reporter Lisa Olson complained of being sexually harassed in the Patriots' locker room, team chairman and majority owner Victor Kiam sought to suspend Sullivan. However, National Football League Commissioner Paul Tagliabue stepped in and prevented the suspension.

On December 20, 1990, Kiam named Sam Jankovich CEO of the Patriots and gave him complete control of the organization. On January 29, Sullivan announced his resignation.

== Post-Patriots ==
Since 1993, Sullivan has served as President of Game Creek Video, a company he founded that provides television production trucks for sporting events.
