= Robert R. Spillane =

American school administrator (1934–2015)

Robert Richard "Bud" Spillane (October 29, 1934 – July 18, 2015) was an American school administrator who served as superintendent of Boston Public Schools and Fairfax County Public Schools.

== Early life ==
Spillane was born on October 29, 1934, in Lowell, Massachusetts. He grew up in Hartford, Connecticut, where his parents worked at the Pratt & Whitney plant. He graduated from Eastern Connecticut State University, where he was a member of the school's basketball team. He later earned a master's degree and doctorate from the University of Connecticut. While at ECSU he met his future wife, Geraldine Shea. They would have 4 children together. During his early years as a teacher, Spillane also owned a Dairy Queen franchise. Although he earned more money from the restaurant than he did from teaching, he decided to remain in education as it was something he was passionate about.

== Career ==
=== Early career ===
Spillane began his career as a fifth-grade teacher in Storrs, Connecticut. In 1958 he became the teaching principal at Chaplin Elementary School in Chaplin, Connecticut. The 25-year-old Spillane was the youngest principal in the state. After working in Trumbull, Connecticut, and Darien, Connecticut, Spillane got his first superintendent job was with the Glassboro Public Schools in Glassboro, New Jersey. He then worked as superintendent of schools of the Roosevelt Union Free School District in Roosevelt, New York. Spillane described the district as "all-black...and a dumping ground for Nassau's social service cases". He unsuccessfully sought to have the district disbanded.

From 1970 to 1978, Spillane was superintendent of the City School District of New Rochelle in New Rochelle, New York. He inherited a $2 million deficit and trimmed the district's budget in order to avoid deficit spending. Spillane was known as a disciplinarian and developed programs for troubled students.

Spillane left New Rochelle to become New York state's deputy education commissioner for elementary, secondary and continuing education. In this role, Spillane had jurisdiction over 3.5 million students and oversaw 83 divisions and a budget of $11 billion.

=== Boston ===
In August 1981, Spillane was hired to replace the fired Robert Coldwell Wood as superintendent of the Boston Public Schools. In 1982 he was given a 4 year contract extension. During his tenure in Boston, Spillane had to make budget cuts due to shortfalls caused by Proposition 2½. He also worked to improve the district's financial management, implemented new curriculum and promotion standards. In 1982, Judge W. Arthur Garrity Jr. ended his court's monitoring of desegregation in Boston Public Schools.

=== Fairfax County ===
In 1985, Spillane left Boston to become superintendent of Fairfax County Public Schools. The job offered a higher salary and was located in a more affluent school district.

Spillane attracted national attention by starting a merit pay for teachers. The program, which was considered a model for other districts, was suspended in 1992 due to budget cuts and eliminated the following year. Spillane also gained attention for lengthening the school day for secondary students by adding a half-hour and a seventh class period.

In 1987, Spillane ordered that a 5-year-old student with AIDS be sent home pending a review on whether she was a danger to other students. During the controversy, Spillane was quoted as saying that the student didn't need a lawyer because she would "be dead in a few months". Spillane denied using those exact words. The school committee voted to readmit the student.

Academic performance improved under Spillane. By 1996 over 66% of high school students graduated with advanced studies diplomas, up from less than 50% when he took over. Average SAT scores among Fairfax students rose as well, however, the average SAT scores of black students were stagnant, and the scores of Hispanic students dropped. In 1995 Spillane was named superintendent of the year by the American Association of School Administrators. Fairfax County had seen a sharp increase in minority students, growing from 12% in 1980 to 37% in 1995. Spillane reduced the pupil to teacher ratio in majority-minority elementary schools from 25 to 1 to 15 to 1 in an effort to improve academic performance.

Spillane was a finalist for New York City Schools Chancellor in 1989, 1993, and 1995 and Texas commissioner of education in 1991.

In 1996, the Fairfax County School Board voted to give Spillane a one-year contract extension through the middle of 1998. However, they informed him that this would be his last contract and they would begin a search for his successor.

== Later life ==
After leaving Fairfax, Spillane joined the United States Department of State, where he oversaw American schools in Europe. In 2006 he became the vice president of the Center for Education at CAN Corp. Spillane died on July 18, 2015, from complications of pulmonary disease at Brigham and Women's Hospital in Boston. He was 80 years old. At the time of his death he was residing in Pawcatuck, Connecticut.
