= John J. Kerrigan =

Member of the Boston City Council
- In office 1976–1978

Chairman of the Boston School Committee
- In office 1969–1969
- Preceded by: Thomas Eisenstadt
- Succeeded by: Joseph Lee
- In office 1974–1974
- Preceded by: Paul R. Tierney
- Succeeded by: John J. McDonough

Personal details
- Born: May 17, 1932
- Died: August 14, 1996 (aged 64)

John J. Kerrigan (May 17, 1932 - August 14, 1996) was a member of the Boston School Committee from 1968 to 1975, and a member of the City Council from 1975 to 1977. He was one of the leading opponents of the plan to integrate the Boston Public School through busing.

Kerrigan was chair of the school committee when, in December 1974, it voted to refuse to comply with the order of Federal District Judge Wendell Arthur Garrity Jr. to desegregate the Boston Public Schools.

Kerrigan entered politics through the encouragement of future Mayor John F. Collins, who was a patient at the medical center where Kerrigan was working as an orderly. Collins encouraged Kerrigan to get advanced schooling, which lead to him getting a law degree from Northeast Law School and later a doctorate in education from the University of Massachusetts.

Kerrigan argued that sending children on long bus rides from one neighborhood to another would not improve the quality of their education. As a school committee member Kerrigan particularly criticized suburban support for busing, and in 1972 introduced a busing bill solely intended to bus students from inner-city schools into the suburban school district where the governor lived. In 1974 he and two other committee members defied a court order to implement a busing plan to desegregate Boston schools, resulting in a contempt of court ruling that Kerrigan called "a gun that's held to the head of the people of Boston." The Boston Globe later characterized Kerrigan's derogatory racial comments about a black reporter during this time as "the most ignominious moment in the stained history of the elected Boston School Committee." After Kerrigan's election to the City Council, the School Committee resumed plans to desegregate the school system.

Kerrigan joined the white flight to the suburbs caused by school busing, moving to Quincy, Massachusetts, in 1978.

In 1994 Kerrigan ran unsuccessfully for the Governor's Council. After a cancer diagnosis, he expressed public regret for being "more abusive than most." Kerrigan died in 1996 at the age of 64. He was a practicing Catholic.

== Sources ==
- Notes to Oral History interview with James W. Hennigan Jr.
- "Obituary". The Boston Globe. Boston, MA. August 15, 1996. Archived from the original on March 7, 2016 – via HighBeam Research.
