= John J. McDonough (Massachusetts politician) =

Chairman of the Boston School Committee
- In office 1975–1976
- Preceded by: John J. Kerrigan
- Succeeded by: Kathleen Sullivan
- In office 1967
- Preceded by: Thomas Eisenstadt
- Succeeded by: Thomas Eisenstadt

President of the Boston School Committee
- In office 1980
- Preceded by: David Finnegan
- Succeeded by: John D. O'Bryant

John J. McDonough is an American politician who served as a member of the Boston School Committee from 1966 to 1968 and again from 1972 to 1982. He was the Chairman/President of the School Committee in 1967, 1975, 1976, and 1980. He was an unsuccessful candidate for Mayor of Boston in 1967.

McDonough was an opponent of court-ordered busing and in 1974 he and two other School Committee members were held in contempt of court for not coming up with a second phase of the desegregation process.

In 1981, McDonough was acquitted on charges of taking a $5,000 kickback from a school bus company.

He is the brother of former Boston City Councilor and city clerk Patrick F. McDonough.
