= Our Lady of Lourdes High School =

Location
- 131 Boardman Road; Poughkeepsie, (Dutchess County), New York 12603; United States
- Coordinates: 41°39′53″N 73°53′25″W

Information
- Type: Private, co-educational
- Religious affiliations: Roman Catholic, Marist Brothers
- Established: 1958 (68 years ago)
- Founder: Francis Cardinal Spellman
- Status: Open
- CEEB code: 334627
- Principal: Meghan Vilardo
- Faculty: 75
- Grades: 9–12
- Student to teacher ratio: 17:1
- Campus: Suburban
- Campus size: 18 acres (73,000 m^{2})
- Colors: Navy Blue and gold
- Athletics: 23 sports
- Athletics conference: Section 9 (NYSPHSAA)
- Team name: Warriors
- Accreditation: Middle States Association of Colleges and Schools
- Tuition: $9,325.00
- Website: ollchs.org

Our Lady of Lourdes High School is an American private Roman Catholic school, located in Poughkeepsie, New York, in Dutchess County.

The school received accreditation from the Middle States Association of Colleges and Schools in May 2004.

In 2009, the school separated itself from the Roman Catholic Archdiocese of New York.

== History ==
The school was founded in April 1958 by Francis Cardinal Spellman, who purchased the former Poughkeepsie High School building and grounds from the Poughkeepsie Board of Education.

The school was given its name in honor of the centenary of the apparition of the Virgin Mary at Lourdes in France.

The new school opened in September 1958 with a faculty of four brothers and four sisters, and an athletic coach. The original school was divided into two halves, one for the boys and one for the girls. Opening enrollment was 280 students. The boys' school opened with four classes of 35 students each, as did the girls' school. Our Lady of Lourdes existed this way as separate schools until 1967.

The campus moved to a suburban location on Boardman Road in the Town of Poughkeepsie starting in the 1996–1997 school year at the location of the former IBM Homestead.

The school was led by Father John Lagiovane from 2007 to 2014. The 2014–2015 school year began under the leadership of the new principal, Catherine Merryman, in September 2014. The current principal is Meghan Vilardo.

== Interscholastic sports ==
Our Lady of Lourdes is a member of the New York State Public High School Athletic Association.

=== Fall ===
- Boys' cross country
- Girls' cross country
- Field hockey
- Football
- Boys' soccer
- Girls' soccer
- Girls' tennis
- Cheerleading
- Girls' volleyball
- Girls' swimming

=== Winter ===
- Boys' basketball
- Girls' basketball
- Boys' swimming
- Cheerleading
- Winter track
- Boys' bowling
- Girls' bowling
- Boys' fencing
- Girls' fencing
- Wrestling

=== Spring ===
- Baseball – 2006 New York State Class A champions
- Crew
- Golf
- Softball
- Boys' tennis
- Outdoor track

== Notable alumni ==
- Ed Bastian (class of 1975) – CEO, Delta Air Lines
- Kelly Cass (class of 1985) – meteorologist
- Bill C. Davis (class of 1969) – playwright; author, Mass Appeal
- Terry Lickona (class of 1965) – Executive Producer of Austin City Limits
- Joseph Mazzello (class of 2001) – actor
- Carter Page (class of 1989) – former foreign policy adviser to the Donald Trump 2016 presidential campaign
- Barbara Rhoades (class of 1964) – actress
- Maddy Siegrist (class of 2018) – She broke the Big East and Villanova’s single-game scoring record with 50pts. She also became the Big East's all-time leading scorer.
- Patrick Whearty (class of 1998) – professional basketball player
