= Frederick Gillis =

Frederick James Gillis

Superintendent of Boston Public Schools
- In office 1960–1963
- Preceded by: Dennis C. Haley
- Succeeded by: William H. Ohrenberger

Personal details
- Born: September 30, 1893 Boston, Massachusetts, U.S.
- Died: December 24, 1988 (aged 95)

Military service
- Allegiance: United States
- Branch/service: United States Army

Frederick James Gillis (September 30, 1893 – December 24, 1988) was an American educator who served as superintendent of Boston Public Schools from 1960 to 1963.

== Early life ==
Gillis was born on September 30, 1893, in Boston. He graduated from the Boston Latin School in 1912 and received his bachelor's degree from Boston College in 1916, his Master of Arts from the Catholic University of America in 1917, a master of foreign service degree from Georgetown University in 1922, and a doctor of philosophy degree from Boston College in 1930. He received the first Cardinal O'Connell scholarship to Boston College and the first Knights of Columbus scholarship to Catholic University.

== Military service ==
Gillis was commissioned a second lieutenant in the United States Army in August 1917 and assigned to the 103rd Infantry Regiment at Camp Bartlett in Westfield, Massachusetts. He sailed for overseas service on September 27, 1917. He was gassed while in fighting in Apremont on May 10, 1918, and remained hospitalized until June 14, 1918. Two days later he took part in the Battle of Xivray-et-Marvoisin. On July 20, 1918, he was wounded twice during the Aisne-Marne Offensive, but returned three times under fire to rescue three of his men. He was the only surviving officer of the 1st Battalion, 103rd Infantry and reorganized the unit at the railroad tracks in Bouresches. He received a promotion to first lieutenant for bravery. He was wounded again during a later battle and despite having his forearm smashed was able to carry a seriously wounded private to a dressing station. From 1922 to 1923 he was a commercial counselor to the Czechoslovak legation in Washington, D.C. In 1924 he was promoted to captain in the United States Army Reserve. He was awarded the Purple Heart in 1933.

== Career ==
=== College instruction ===
Gillis began his career in education on the staff at Catholic University. He taught at Boston University's School of Business Administration from 1924 to 1925, Regis College from 1927 to 1935, and spent eight years on the staff of the Massachusetts State Extension School. He also taught courses at the Catholic Summer School of America, Boston Teachers' College, and the Salem Teachers College. In 1932 he joined the staff at Boston College as the head of its department of education.

=== Assistant superintendent ===
In 1935, Gillis joined Boston Public Schools as assistant superintendent. As assistant superintendent, Gillis organized and developed classes and intellectually disabled students, arranged and started a Braille class, developed the safety education program and the program of safety broadcasts by school pupils, organized the school lunch program, arranged for a playground for physically disabled children, and from 1948 to 1960 directed the Boston Home and School Association.

Gillis was considered for the superintendent's position following Patrick T. Campbell's death in 1937, but Arthur L. Gould was chosen instead. Following Gould's retirement in 1948 he was again considered for the position but lost to Dennis C. Haley.

=== Superintendent ===
Following Haley's departure in 1960, Springfield, Massachusetts superintendent Joseph McCook and Longfellow School principal Charles O. Ruddy were reported to be the favorites to succeed him. However, in a surprise decision, the school committee voted 3 to 2 to appoint Gillis.

During Gillis' tenure as superintendent, the city's issues with racial segregation came to the forefront. Due to de facto ethnic grouping in the city, Boston's schools were effectively segregated. Schools with a majority of black students were in worse shape, were more disciplinarian, and located in more crime-ridden areas compared to those with mostly white students. In 1960, Gillis instituted an “open seat” policy, which allowed parents to move their child from their neighborhood school to another school in the district if there are vacant seats available and the child is suitable for the program. This policy allowed a number of African-American students to move to better schools. However, this policy was ineffective because the district did not provide transportation for these students.

Gillis retired on September 30, 1963, after reaching the mandatory retirement age of 70.

== Personal life ==
Gillis and his wife, Ellen (Russell) Gillis, had six children. On Halloween 1939, defective wiring caused a fire in the family's West Roxbury home. The fire caused $8,000 in damages and all of the family members and pets survived. In 1943, Gillis was hospitalized with a severely lacerated trachea after a piece of a chicken bone got stuck in his throat. During the Korean War, one of Gillis' sons, Daniel, went missing after his fighter plane disappeared off of the Florida coast. Another son, William, was awarded the Bronze Star Medal. Gillis died on December 24, 1988, at the Veterans Administration Medical Center in West Roxbury. He was 95 years old. He was buried in St. Joseph Cemetery.

Educational offices
Preceded by Dennis C. Haley	Superintendent of Boston Public Schools; 1960–1963	Succeeded by William H. Ohrenberger
