= David G. Farragut Elementary School =

School in Massachusetts, United States

Coordinates: 42°19′15.55″N 71°06′22.54″W

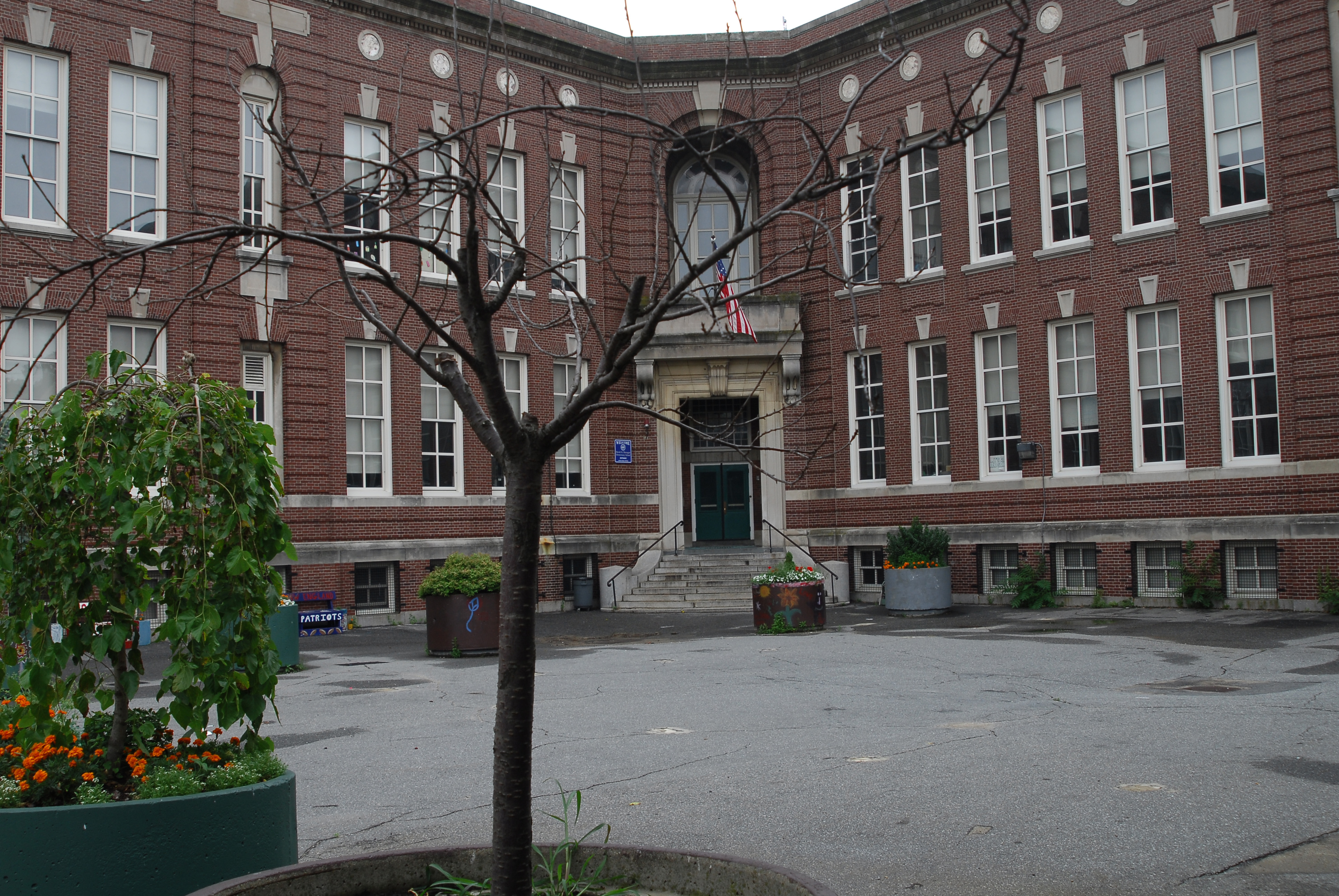
David G. Farragut Elementary School

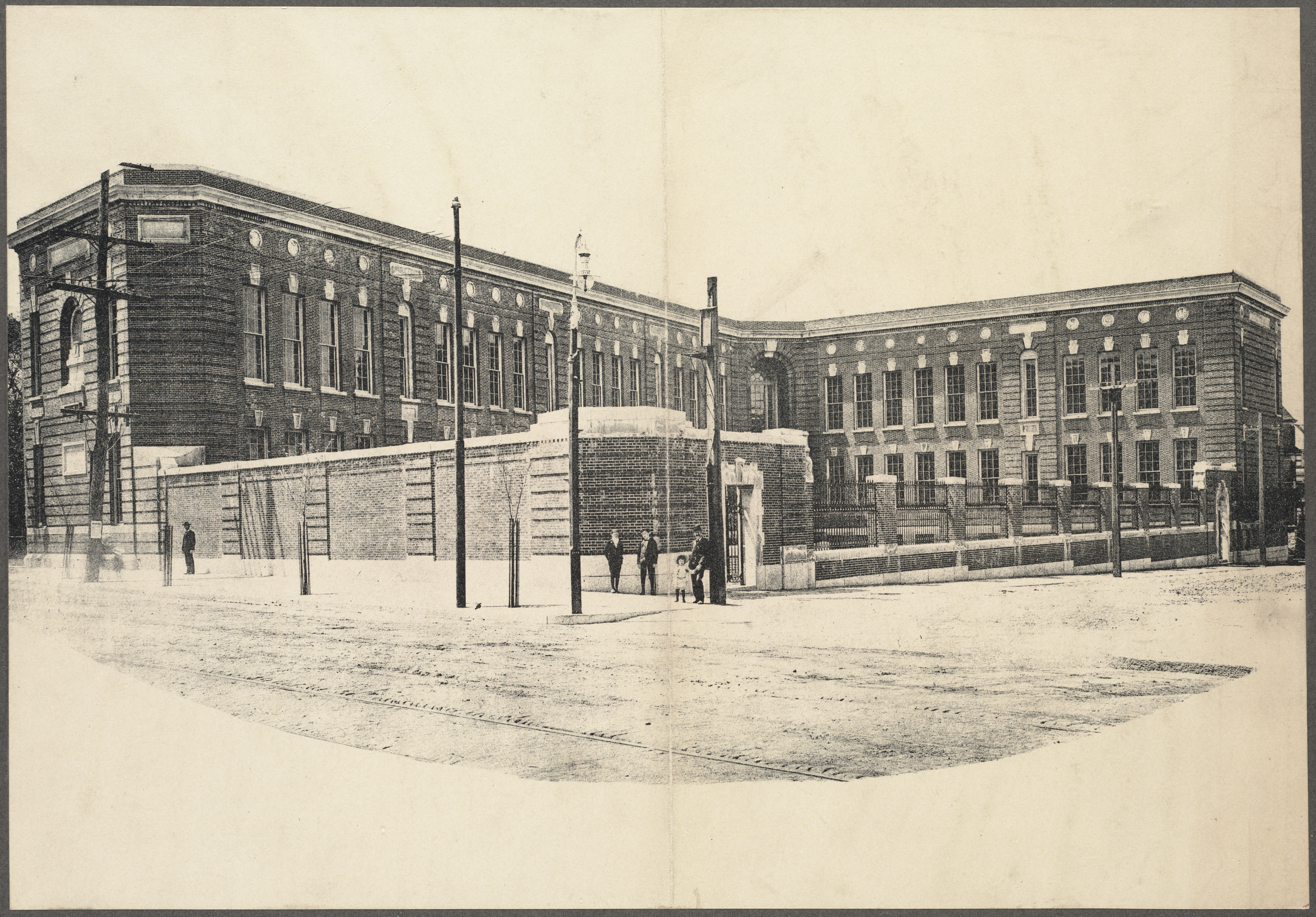
David G Farragut Elementary School 1904

David G. Farragut Elementary School, also known as The Farragut School, was a public elementary school located at 10 Fenwood Road, in the Mission Hill neighborhood of Boston, Massachusetts, at the intersection of Fenwood Road and Huntington Avenue. The school was located next to the Fenwood Road trolley-train stop on the "E" branch of the MBTA's Green Line and Brigham and Women's Hospital.

The Farragut School opened in early 1904 and closed in 2011 amidst a restructuring of the Boston Public Schools. At the time of its closure, the school served students from Kindergarten through Grade 5 and had around 15 teachers overseeing 230 students. The school served an approximate population of more than 25,000 people.

The Farragut School building now houses the lower school campus of the Edward M. Kennedy Academy for Health Careers.

== See also ==
- David Farragut
