= Michael A. Sullivan (judge) =

Historic American judge

Chief Justice of the Massachusetts Land Court
- In office 1936–1937
- Preceded by: Charles T. Davis
- Succeeded by: John E. Fenton

District Attorney for Essex County, Massachusetts
- In office 1915
- Preceded by: Henry C. Atwill
- Succeeded by: Louis Cox

Personal details
- Born: Michael Augustin Sullivan; August 13, 1879 Lawrence, Massachusetts, U.S.
- Died: June 7, 1937 (aged 57) Lawrence, Massachusetts, U.S.
- Resting place: St. Mary's Cemetery; Lawrence, Massachusetts
- Party: Democratic
- Spouse: Margaret Sullivan (1911–1937; his death)
- Children: 1
- Education: Harvard College; Harvard Law School
- Occupation: Lawyer

Michael Augustin Sullivan (August 13, 1879 – June 7, 1937) was an American jurist who served as chief justice of the Massachusetts Land Court.

== Early life ==
Sullivan was born on August 13, 1879, in Lawrence, Massachusetts. He graduated from Phillips Academy in 1897, Harvard College in 1901, and Harvard Law School in 1903.

== Legal career ==
Sullivan was admitted to the bar in 1903 and practiced in Lawrence and Boston. In 1915 he was appointed District Attorney of Essex County, Massachusetts by Governor David I. Walsh to fill the vacancy caused by Henry C. Atwill's election as Massachusetts Attorney General. He was defeated by Louis Cox 58% to 37% in the special election to complete Atwill's term. Sullivan was a delegate to the 1917 Massachusetts Constitutional Convention and the 1928 Democratic National Convention. In 1936, Sullivan was appointed to the Massachusetts Land Court by Governor James Michael Curley. He remained on the bench until his death on June 7, 1937.
