= The Elusive Ideal =

Book by Adam R. Nelson

The Elusive ideal
- Author: Adam R. Nelson
- Subject: Education politics, American urban history, law and society, urban politics
- Published: May 2005 (University of Chicago Press)
- Pages: 352
- ISBN: 9780226571904

The Elusive Ideal: Equal Educational Opportunity and the Federal Role in Boston's Public Schools, 1950–1985 is a social history book written by Adam R. Nelson on the relationship between the Boston public schools and local, state, and federal public policy in the mid-20th century. The University of Chicago Press published the title in May 2005.
