= Tommy Chang =

Tommy Chang may refer to:

- Tommy Chang (martial artist), Korean-Canadian martial artist and actor
- Tommy Chang (educator), former Superintendent of Public Schools in Boston, Massachusetts
