= Poughkeepsie High School =

Coordinates: 41.694882°N 73.91371°W

Location
- 70 Forbus Street; Poughkeepsie, Dutchess County, New York 12601

Information
- Motto: Champions of children
- School district: Poughkeepsie City School District
- Superintendent: Eric Jay Rosser
- Principal: Dr. Phee Simpson
- Teaching staff: 98.93 (on an FTE basis)
- Grades: 9-12
- Enrollment: 1,151 (2024–2025)
- Student to teacher ratio: 11.65
- Color
- Team name: Pioneers
- Website: Poughkeepsie High School

Poughkeepsie High School is the public high school (grades 9-12) in the city of Poughkeepsie, New York. It is categorized as an inner city school district as a result of the high percentage of students living in low-income households. In the 2014-2015 school year, 73% of students were eligible for free or reduced-price lunch. PHS did not meet the Adequate Yearly Progress (AYP) specified by the No Child Left Behind Act in 2011-12. Poughkeepsie High School is currently the only 9-12 school within the Poughkeepsie City School District.

In 2014-15, there were 1,137 students enrolled in the High School, with an average class size of 20. The student:teacher ratio was approximately 13:1. The attendance rate in the 2013-2014 school year was 93%, and the suspension rate in that same year was 22%. 30% of teachers have their master's degree plus 30 Hours or Doctorate.

== History ==
Poughkeepsie High School opened in 1857 on the second floor of an elementary school; the first graduating class was 1863. Classes were not held in 1865, but resumed in 1866 in rented space. A new building was opened in 1872.

Yet another new building was built on North Hamilton Street in 1914 to accommodate 1,200 pupils. By the early 1950s, the population was outgrowing this building as well, and another location was sought, this time on Forbus Street. the State Education Department endorsed this move while city officials wanted to build an addition to the North Hamilton Street building. The new building on Forbus Street was completed in 1956, and students walked from the old building to the new one to celebrate the opening. Additions to the building were approved in 2002 as part of $27 million approved by voters for additions to buildings in the district that year. In 1958, the old high school building was sold to the Catholic Archdiocese of New York for $250,000. The Archdiocese would use this building to open Our Lady of Lourdes High School in April of that year.

As part of the renovation approved by taxpayers in 2002, a new wing was added to the Forbus Street building. This wing is currently home to the science and math departments at the high school, as well as several computer labs. The addition of this wing created a small courtyard in the high school building, which was later turned into the Michelle Obama Victory Garden. This garden is managed by teachers and students at the high school and serves as an alternate route to get to classes.

== Demographics (24-25) ==
41% Black
10% White
47% Hispanic
1% Asian or Native Hawaiian/Other Pacific Islander

51% Male
49% Female

== America's Choice School ==
Under former superintendent Dr. Laval Wilson, the High School began to operate as an America's Choice School. The America's Choice program aims to improve the standings of schools deemed to be at-risk. The program utilizes specific teaching methods as well as intensive teacher training regimens in order to attempt to improve student achievement, test scores, and graduation rates, as well as to reduce the number of discipline problems.

== Dutchess County Regional Chamber of Commerce ==
Poughkeepsie High School also hosts a program with the Dutchess County Regional Chamber of Commerce. This program has staff from the Chamber of Commerce teaching alongside a PHS teacher in the classroom. Students are taught job and career skills as well as enhanced typing. Students in the class also have an opportunity to network with local business owners. The Chamber of Commerce and High School host monthly gatherings with students from the class in which they participate in bonding activities with the local business owners.

== Advanced placement ==
The school offers Advanced Placement (AP) courses in the following subjects:

- AP Biology
- AP Calculus AB
- AP English Literature
- AP Spanish Language
- AP English Language and Composition
- AP World History
- AP United States History
- AP Statistics
- AP Computer Science A

Poughkeepsie High School also has an Air Force Junior Reserve Officer's Training Corps (AFJROTC) class, which was introduced at the end of the 2014-15 school year.

== Athletics ==
Poughkeepsie High School's mascot is the Pioneer, and the school colors are blue and white. As a part of a $22.8 million district-wide construction project, Poughkeepsie High School opened a new athletic complex on September 14, 2012. The complex is home to a football field, baseball field, and a soccer field, all of which are artificial turf. It services the baseball, football, soccer, and softball teams. The current sports offered at PHS are as follows:

- Baseball (Boys)
- Basketball (Boys)
- Cheerleading (Boys/Girls)
- Crew (Boys/Girls)
- Football (Boys)
- Golf (Boys)
- Soccer (Boys/Girls)
- Softball (Girls)
- Swimming (Boys/Girls)
- Tennis (Boys/Girls)
- Track, Indoor (Boys/Girls)
- Track, Outdoor (Boys/Girls)
- Volleyball (Girls)
- Wrestling (Boys/Girls)

== Extracurricular activities ==
Extracurricular student clubs and activities include:

- Concert Band
- Gay/Straight Alliance
- Jazz Ensemble
- Multicutural Club
- Math Team
- Debate and Ethics bowl
- National Honor Society
- Orchestra
- Pioneer Post (School Newspaper)
- Science Olympiad
- Sister2Sister
- Brother2Brother
- Student Government
- Culture Shock (Drama)
- Wind Ensemble
- Yearbook

== Relationship with Vassar College ==
As of 2008, Poughkeepsie High School graduates who are accepted to Vassar College receive a special financial aid package. This Program eliminates loans for the PHS graduates attending Vassar and replaces them with scholarship funding.

== Other high schools in the Poughkeepsie area ==
- Arlington High School (LaGrange, New York)
- Oakwood School
- Our Lady of Lourdes High School
- Poughkeepsie Day School
- Spackenkill High School
