= Thomas Payzant =

American educator (1940–2021)

Superintendent of Boston Public Schools
- In office 1995–2006
- Preceded by: Lois Harrison-Jones
- Succeeded by: Carol R. Johnson

Assistant Secretary of Education for Elementary and Secondary Education
- In office 1993–1995
- Preceded by: John T. MacDonald
- Succeeded by: Gerald N. Tirozzi

Personal details
- Born: November 29, 1940 Boston
- Died: July 23, 2021 (aged 80) Sandy, Utah

Thomas William Payzant (November 29, 1940 – July 23, 2021) was an American educator who served as superintendent of San Diego Unified School District and Boston Public Schools and was Assistant Secretary of Education for Elementary and Secondary Education.

== Early life ==
Payzant was born on November 29, 1940, in Boston. He grew up in Quincy, Massachusetts. His mother was a schoolteacher and his father was a real estate salesman who died when Payzant was 6 years old. He earned a Bachelor's degree in history from Williams College a master's degree in teaching and a doctorate in education from Harvard University. On June 16, 1962, he married Ellen Watson in Newburgh, New York. The couple met when a student mixer Payzant was a student at Mount Hermon School and Watson attended the nearby Northfield School.

== Career ==
Payzant began his teaching career in 1963 at Belmont High School. He moved to the West Coast to teach junior high school in Tacoma, Washington. His first superintendent’s job came in 1969 when he was chosen to lead the School District of Springfield Township, Montgomery County, Pennsylvania.

In 1973, Payzant became superintendent of the Eugene School District. He instituted kindergarten classes in the district. In 1976, Payzant was indicted by a grand jury for failing to immediately report allegations of sexual abuse of a minor by a Eugene elementary school teacher. The complaint against Payzant was dropped because the judge found the issue to be a civil matter. The criminal complaint against the teacher was eventually dropped. Payzant was also sued by four principals who were transferred without public hearings. A judge allowed the transfers to stand. From 1977 to 1978 he was also a visiting professor at University of Oregon.

From 1979 to 1982, Payzant was the superintendent of Oklahoma City Public Schools. He then served as superintendent of the San Diego Unified School District from 1982 to 1993.

In 1993, Payzant was nominated for the position of Assistant Secretary of Education for Elementary and Secondary Education in the United States Department of Education. His nomination came under fire from conservatives due to his decision to end a tutoring program run by the Boy Scouts of America on school grounds during school hours because he felt that the organization’s ban on homosexual leaders violated the San Diego Unified School District’s non-discrimination policy. The United States Senate confirmed Payzant by a 72-27 vote.

On August 3, 1995, the Boston school committee voted 5 to 2 to name Payzant superintendent of schools. During his 11 years in Boston, student achievement improved, with Boston schools matching or bettering statewide gains in student test scores. In 2006, Boston Public Schools won the Broad Prize for Urban Education.

== Later life ==
Payzant retired to Sandy, Utah. He died on July 23, 2021, complications from Alzheimer's disease at the age of 80. He was survived by his wife and three children.
