= John Fenton =

John or Jack Fenton may refer to:

- Jack R. Fenton (1916–2007), leader in the California State Assembly
- Jack and Maddie Fenton, fictional characters from the Nickelodeon animated television series, Danny Phantom
- John Fenton (hurler) (born 1955), Irish hurler
- John William Fenton (1828–1890), bandmaster
- John Charles Fenton (1880–1951), Scottish lawyer
- John E. Fenton, judge
- John Fenton (musician)
- John Fenton (priest) (1921–2008), British priest and New Testament scholar
- John Fenton (MP for Rochdale), British Member of Parliament for Rochdale and father of Roger Fenton
- John Fenton (died 1556), MP for Stamford (UK Parliament constituency)

== See also ==
- John Fenton-Cawthorne, British Conservative politician
