= Boston Public Schools =

Public school system of Boston

Location
- 2300 Washington Street, Roxbury, Boston, MA 02119 United States

District information
- Type: Public
- Grades: K-12
- Established: 1647
- Superintendent: Mary Skipper
- Schools: 109 (2023-2024)
- Budget: $1,332,439,836 total $20,247 per pupil (2016)

Students and staff
- Students: 45,742 (2023-2024)
- Teachers: 4,256(2021-2022)
- Staff: 4,352 (2009-2010)
- Student–teacher ratio: 10.8 to 1 (2014-2015)

Other information
- Average SAT scores: 496 verbal 513 math 1009 total (2017-2018)
- Website: Boston Public Schools

Boston Public Schools (BPS) is a school district serving the city of Boston, Massachusetts, United States. It is the largest public school district in the state of Massachusetts.

== Leadership ==
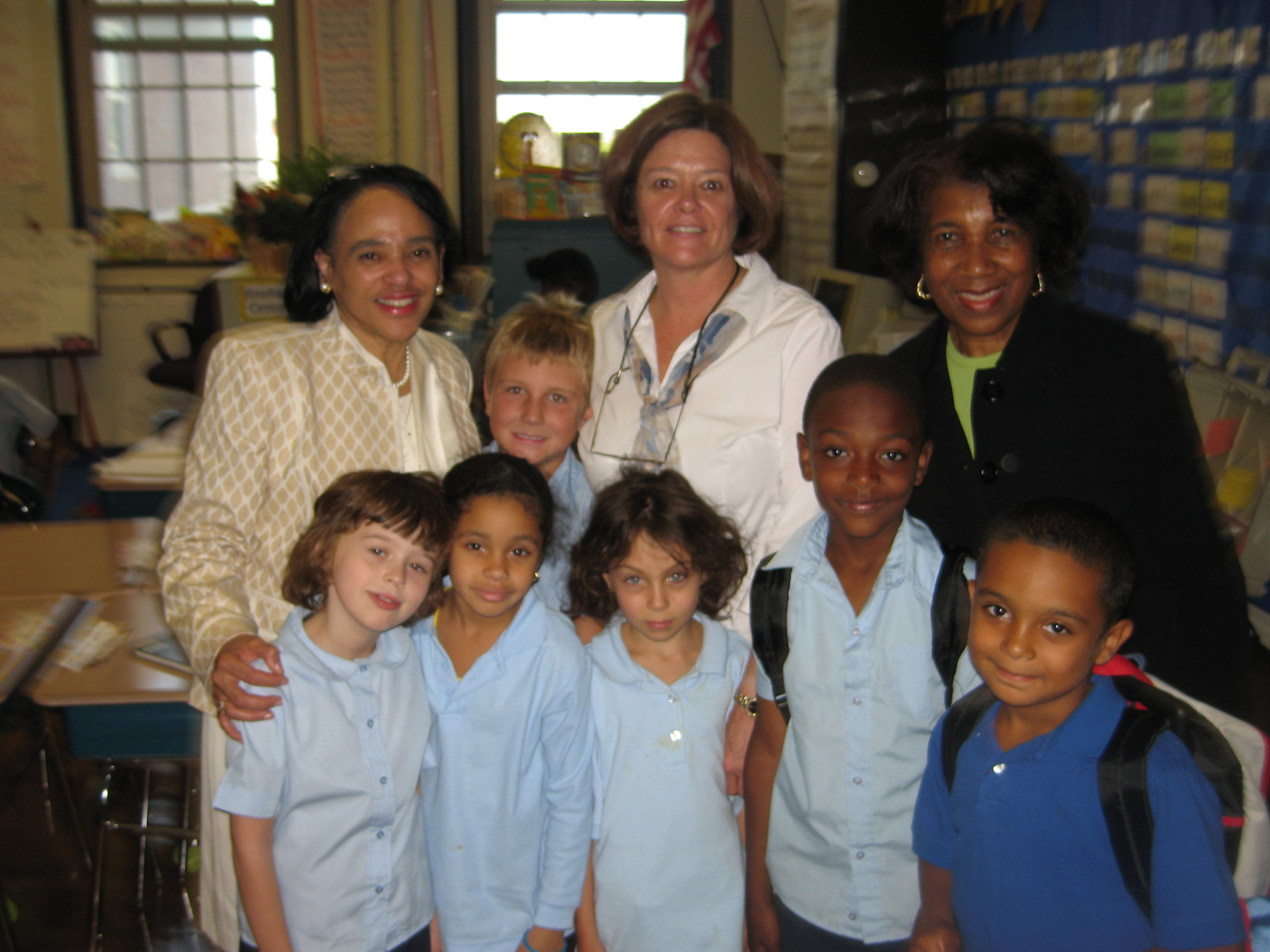
Dr. Carol R. Johnson (back row, far left), former Superintendent of the Boston Public Schools, meets students and their teacher Mrs. McClain and principal at the Bates Elementary School in Roslindale.

The district is led by a superintendent, hired by the Boston School Committee, a seven-member school board appointed by the mayor after approval by a nominating committee of specified stakeholders. The School Committee sets policy for the district and approves the district's annual operating budget. This governing body replaced a 13-member elected committee after a public referendum vote in 1991. The superintendent serves as a member of the mayor's cabinet.

From October 1995 through June 2006, Dr. Thomas Payzant served as superintendent. A former undersecretary in the US Department of Education, Payzant was the first superintendent selected by the appointed School Committee. Upon Dr. Payzant's retirement, Chief Operating Officer Michael G. Contompasis, former headmaster of Boston Latin School, became Interim Superintendent, and was appointed superintendent in October 2006. Dr. Manuel J. Rivera, superintendent of the Rochester City School District, had agreed to become the next superintendent of the BPS, but instead accepted a post as deputy secretary for public education for New York Governor Eliot Spitzer. In June 2007, the Boston School Committee voted unanimously to appoint Dr. Carol R. Johnson as the next superintendent, beginning in August 2007. Dr. Johnson had served as superintendent of the Memphis City Schools since 2003. Dr. Johnson's tenure ended in summer 2013, and John McDonough served as interim superintendent until July 1, 2015. The superintendent was Dr. Tommy Chang until his resignation in 2018. Laura Perille served as interim superintendent until July 2019 when Brenda Cassellius began her tenure. Cassellius resigned effective June 2022, and was replaced on an interim basis by Dr. Drew Echelson. Drew Echelson has been named in a multimillion dollar lawsuit charging him and Boston Public Schools with racism and discrimination. He has also been accused of falsifying his educational background. Mary Skipper has served as superintendent since September 2022.

The mayor and Boston City Council have control over the overall appropriation for the Boston Public Schools, but the School Committee has control over how funding is allocated internally, and has control over policy.

=== List of superintendents ===
- Nathan Bishop (1851–1856)
- John Dudley Philbrick (1856–1878)
- Samuel Eliot (1878–1880)
- Edwin P. Seaver (1880–1904)
- George H. Conley (1904–1905)
- Walter S. Parker (1905–1906) Acting
- Stratton D. Brooks (1906–1912)
- Maurice P. White (1912–1912) Acting
- Dr. Franklin B. Dyer (1912–1918)
- Frank V. Thompson (1918–1921)
- Jeremiah E. Burke (1921–1931)
- Patrick T. Campbell (1931–1937)
- Arthur L. Gould (1937–1948)
- Dr. Dennis C. Haley (1948–1960)
- Dr. Frederick Gillis (1960–1963)
- Dr. William H. Ohrenberger (1963–1972)
- William J. Leary (1972–1975)
- Marion Fahey (1975–1978)
- Robert Coldwell Wood (1978–1980)
- Paul Kennedy (1980–1981) Acting
- Joseph McDonough (1981) Acting
- Robert R. Spillane (1981–1985)
- Dr. Laval S. Wilson (1985–1991)
- Lois Harrison-Jones (1991–1995)
- Dr. Thomas Payzant (1995–2006)
- Michael G. Contompasis (2006–2007) Interim
- Dr. Carol R. Johnson (2007–2012)
- John McDonough (2012–2015) Interim
- Dr. Tommy Chang (2015–2018)
- Laura Perille (2018–2019) Interim
- Dr. Brenda Cassellius (2019–2022)
- Dr. Drew Echelson (2022) Interim
- Mary Skipper (2022–)

== History ==
BPS is the oldest public school system in America, founded in 1647. It is also the home of the nation's first public school, Boston Latin School, founded in 1635. The Mather School opened in 1639 as the nation's first public elementary school, and English High School, the second public high school in the country, opened in 1821. In 1965, the state enacted the Racial Imbalance Law, requiring school districts to design and implement plans to effect racial balancing in schools that were more than 50% "non-white". After years of consistent failure by the Boston School Committee to comply with the law, the U.S District Court ruled in 1974 that the schools were unconstitutionally segregated, and implemented as a remedy the busing of many students from their neighborhood schools to other schools across the city.

In April 2016, after four BPS schools (including Boston Latin Academy) were found to have levels of lead above the state action level in fountain drinking water, the administration of Massachusetts Governor Charlie Baker announced that it would provide $2 million from the Massachusetts Clean Water Trust to fund a testing program operated by the Massachusetts Department of Environmental Protection to provide technical assistance to public school districts in assessing samples of water both from fountains and from taps used in food preparation. The next November, Baker provided an additional $750,000 to the program for further technical assistance with sampling and testing.

In November 2021, an analysis of primary and secondary school enrollment statistics conducted by The Boston Globe found that enrollment in the district's 122 schools and 6 in-district charter schools in the 2021–2022 academic year had declined by more than 2,000 students from the previous academic year to less than 50,000 students for the first time in decades after falling by approximately 8,000 students during the previous decade. The following month, the Boston School Committee voted to close the Washington Irving Middle School, the James P. Timilty Middle School, and the Jackson/Mann K-8 School at the end of the school year. After a series of audits conducted by KPMG for the city found that the district may have overstated its graduation rates in 5 of the 7 academic years since 2014, the Massachusetts Department of Elementary and Secondary Education Commissioner notified the Boston Public Schools in March 2022 that the state would conduct a second district review following a two-year memorandum of understanding between the state and the district in lieu of receivership from the previous district review in 2020.

In testimony before the Massachusetts Board of Education in the same month, Boston Mayor Michelle Wu urged the State Board to not place the district under receivership, arguing that receivership would be counterproductive in light of her administration's transition and the district's search for a new superintendent. In May 2022, the Boston School Committee voted to close the Mission Hill K-8 School at the recommendation of the district superintendent following the completion of a report investigating multiple bullying incidents at the school. In the 2022–2023 academic year, enrollment in the Boston Public Schools and the city's in-district charter schools fell for the eighth consecutive year. Pursuant to a report issued by the Boston Public Health Commission, Mayor Wu announced in March 2024 that the Lee K-8 School, the McCormack Academy, the MLK Jr. Elementary School, the Madison Park Technical Vocational High School, the TechBoston Academy, the Henderson K-12 Inclusion School, and the Young Achievers School would participate in two programs aimed at addressing a rise in mental health issues among BPS students that her administration was committing $21 million in city government funding.

=== Busing and racial equity ===
The segregated state of Boston's neighborhoods, and school districts, that prompted busing were the direct result of redlining, the denial of mortgages to racial minorities. In most other American cities, redlining had prompted large amounts of white flight to the suburbs. However, unlike those cities, at the time Boston's white population was still composed heavily of immigrant and first-generation families, the vast majority of which either lacked the means or desire to leave the city. As a result, redlining in Boston saw the creation of neighborhoods that were for the most part equally economically disadvantaged but racially imbalanced.

Subsequently, by the time of forced busing came to be in 1974 the majority of the white population were lower-middle and lower-class second-generation blue-collar nuclear families who were heavily reliant on public amenities and infrastructure. Neighborhood schools were part of the family-centered way of life for white families in Boston, a source of neighborhood pride and shared identity.

Equally economically disadvantaged, the African American communities were heavily reliant on Boston's public amenities and infrastructure as well. However, due to the racial bias and corrupt oversight, the infrastructure of Boston's African American neighborhoods paled in comparison to that offered in primarily white communities. This inequality was nowhere more appalling or evident than in the neighborhood schools. In many cases, the understaffed and poorly funded schools were forced to teach with small quantities of outdated reading material and textbooks, as well as carefully rationed school supplies such as pencils, collecting them at the end of the day to ensure they would have enough. This lack of funding and support for the African American neighborhood schools was a result of the lack of proper and equal allocation of funding between white and black school districts within the Boston public school system. This primarily resulted from the racially prejudice all-white Boston public schools committee that wouldn't end up integrating until 1977 with the election of John D. O'Bryant almost three full years after forced busing had begun.

As a direct result of this infrastructure imbalance when integration was instituted and forced busing began the two communities reacted almost conversely. The African American communities although somewhat upset about losing the convenience of the local neighborhood schools welcomed the change with open arms hoping that it would force the school committee to fund all the schools with greater equality than in the past and that it would allow their children to gain a better education in the meantime. Unfortunately, almost all of the white communities saw busing as an inconvenience and a threat to what little privilege they still had as lower-class whites rather than seeing it as an opportunity for greater equality. As a result, when school began, on September 12, 1974, many white families refused to send their kids to school and whole neighborhoods engaged in racially charged riots during which many enacted acts of violence such as throwing rocks, flipping police cars, and even attacking African Americans who happened to be driving or passing by at the time. The violence and rioting continued until October of the same year when the National Guard was brought in to quell the violence.

In September 2006 the district won the Broad Prize for Urban Education for reducing the achievement gap for low-income and minority students. The national prize, sponsored by philanthropist Eli Broad, includes $500,000 in college scholarships to graduates from the winning district. In most years since the prize program began in 2002, Boston has been a finalist, earning $125,000 in scholarships each year.

=== Busing delays ===
The district changed school bus route planning using paper and pencil to software called Versatrans in September, 2010, which underestimated the time needed to pick up students and caused widespread problems with late buses. The problems with contractor First Student continued in the 2011–2012 school year, attributed both to misplanned routes and drivers not showing up for work on time. BPS switched contractors from First Student to Veolia Transdev effective July 1, 2013. Bus drivers conducted a wildcat strike in October 2013 demanding removal of GPS tracking devices on school buses that let parents locate the bus, and the abandonment of Versatrans. Contract negotiation problems caused stranded charters school and special education students in August, 2014. A group of researchers from MIT won a BPS contest to overhaul bus routes, and a new software model was used in at the start of the 2017–2018 school year. The number of buses was reduced, and on-time performance declined compared to the previous year, both due to inaccurate planning and drivers not departing the bus yard on time. In 2018, the bus drivers' union threatened a strike over the summer, and in August some runs for charter and special education students were not performed due to a bus driver shortage. Aggressive hiring then caused bus driver shortages to cascade into suburban districts.

Problems with late buses worsened again in fall 2019, leading some parents to hire a ride hailing service to pick up students stranded for over three hours. The district hired consultant Michael Turza to attempt another fix. The COVID-19 pandemic in Massachusetts closed school buildings for much of 2021. At the beginning of the 2021–22 school year, school bus delays returned amid a nationwide labor shortage. Governor Charlie Baker called up the Massachusetts National Guard to supplement the available pool of drivers in Eastern Massachusetts, sending Guard members to drive smaller vehicles in the cities of Chelsea, Lawrence, Lowell and Lynn.

=== Potential state takeover ===
Discussions of a potential state takeover (receivership) of Boston Public Schools peaked in 2022 amid chronic low test scores, enrollment decline, and governance issues, prompting the state to impose a targeted improvement plan instead of full receivership.

The state decided against takeover in favor of a partnership agreement with the city, which ended in 2025 with mixed results and no extension, despite ongoing concerns about academic performance.

Holland Elementary exited state receivership July 1, 2026.

== Incidents of violence ==
Boston Public Schools has been accused of mismanagement related to incidents of violence. These incidents include brawls and disruptions at schools like James F. Condon K-8 in South Boston (with fights spilling off-campus and a bullet found in a bathroom), staff assaults such as an attack on a Henderson School staff member breaking up a fight and a teacher at a Roxbury school punched repeatedly in the face leading to PTSD leave, and the stabbing of a 17-year-old student in a hallway at Madison Park Technical Vocational High School in Roxbury.

Broader concerns have involved bullying, sexual assaults, and safety debates, prompting calls for more police presence and reforms, amid a national rise in school-related violence.

In 2015, English High School academic dean Shaun Harrison, a secret Latin Kings gang member who recruited students into drug dealing, shot a 17-year-old student in the back of the head. He was convicted and received lengthy state and federal sentences and ordered to pay $10+ million to the victim.

In November 2021, Henderson Inclusion School Principal Patricia Lampron was beaten unconscious by a 16-year-old student during dismissal, suffering a traumatic brain injury with lasting effects on her speech and mobility. The attacker, Laurette Lerouge, later pleaded guilty.

== Operations ==
=== Budget ===
The one hundred largest school districts in the nation (by enrollment) spend an average of $14,000 per pupil every year. However, census data from 2017 shows that the BPS easily placed second, by spending $22,292. Only the New York City Department of Education exceeded this figure.

=== Student assignment policy ===
Boston Public Schools (BPS) operates schools throughout the city of Boston. BPS assigns students based on preferences of the applicants and priorities of students in various zones.

Since 1989, the city has broken the district into three zones for elementary- and middle-school students. High schoolers can choose any school throughout the city, since they can ride public transportation. Due to the geography of East Boston, for all grade levels each child in East Boston is guaranteed a seat at a school in East Boston.

In 2013, the Boston School Committee voted to begin a new school choice system for the 2014–15 school year and beyond. The new plan, called "Home-Based," measures schools through a combination of MCAS scores and growth, which are grouped in four tiers. Every family has at least two schools within the top tier, four in the top half of performance, and six in the top 75%. Families also are able to list any school within one mile of their home. The plan was first approved by an External Advisory Committee made up of parents, academic experts and community leaders. It was developed by an academic team from Harvard and MIT, which volunteered for the project after hearing about the community process in 2012. The District launched a website, to help the community follow the process and contribute.

=== Geography ===
In 2017 the district's schools switched from the Mercator map projection (which accurately shows directions, but inflates areas in high latitudes) to the Gall–Peters projection (which distorts directions, but is one of many equal-area projections).

== Schools ==
=== Early childhood education ===
These schools offer programs starting at either age 3 (K0) or age 4 (K1) and ending in either the first or third grade.

- Baldwin Early Learning Center (Pilot)
- East Boston Early Education Center
- Ellison/Parks Early Education School
- Haynes Early Education Center
- West Zone Early Learning Center

=== Elementary schools ===
- Adams Elementary School
- Bates Elementary School
- Beethoven Elementary School
- Blackstone Elementary School
- Bradley Elementary School
- Channing Elementary School
- Condon Elementary School
- Chittick Elementary School
- Conley Elementary School
- Dever Elementary School (K-6)
- Dudley Street Neighborhood School (Charter)
- Elihu Greenwood Leadership Academy (Defunct, old building now used by Another Course to College)
- Ellis Elementary School
- Everett Elementary School
- Grew Elementary School
- Guild Elementary School
- Hale Elementary School
- Harvard/Kent Elementary School
- Henderson Elementary lower school
- Henderson Elementary Upper school
- Hennigan Elementary School
- Holland Elementary School
- Holmes Elementary School
- Josiah Quincy Elementary School
- Kennedy, John F. Elementary School
- Kennedy, P. J. Elementary School
- Kenny Elementary School
- Manning Elementary School
- Marshall Elementary School
- Mason Elementary School
- Mather Elementary School
- Mattahunt Elementary School
- Mendell Elementary School
- Mozart Elementary School
- O'Donnell Elementary School
- Otis Elementary School
- Perkins Elementary School
- Roberts Elementary School
- Roger Clap Innovation School
- Russell Elementary School
- Shaw-Taylor Elementary School
- Tynan Elementary School
- Winship Elementary School
- Winthrop Elementary School

=== K-8 schools ===
- Boston Teachers Union School K-8 (Pilot)
- Curley K-8 School
- Donald McKay K-8 school
- Edison K-8 School
- Eliot K-8 Innovation School
- Greenwood (Sarah) K-8 School
- Haley K-8 School (Pilot)
- Hernández K-8 School
- Higginson/Lewis K-8 School
- Hurley K-8 School
- Kilmer K-8 School
- King K-8 School
- Lee K-8 School
- Lyndon K-8 School (Pilot)
- Lyon K–8 School
- Mario Umana Academy
- McKay K-8 School
- Mildred Avenue K-8 School
- Murphy K-8 School
- Orchard Gardens K-8 School (Pilot)
- Perry K-8 School
- Roosevelt K-8 School
- Tobin K-8 School
- Trotter K-8 School
- Warren/Prescott K-8 School
- Young Achievers Science and Math K-8 (Pilot)

=== Public Montessori Education ===
- Alighieri Dante Montessori School

=== Middle schools ===
- Frederick Middle School (Pilot)
- UP Academy Charter School of Boston

=== 6-12 schools ===
- Dearborn STEM Academy
- Henderson Upper School
- Josiah Quincy Upper School (Pilot)
- TechBoston Academy

=== High schools ===
- Dr. Albert D. Holland High School of Technology (formerly Jeremiah E. Burke High School)
- Another Course to College (Pilot)
- Boston Adult Technical Academy (For students ages 19–22)
- Boston Arts Academy (Pilot)
- Boston Day & Evening Academy (Charter)
- Boston Green Academy (Charter)
- Boston International High School (For students not yet proficient in English)
- Brighton High School
- Charlestown High School
- Community Academy (Alternative school)
- Community Academy of Science and Health
- Dorchester Academy
- East Boston High School
- Edward M. Kennedy Academy for Health Careers
- The English High School
- Excel High School
- Fenway High School (Pilot)
- Greater Egleston High School (Pilot)
- Lyon High School
- Madison Park Technical Vocational High School
- Margarita Muñiz Academy
- Mary K. Lyon High School (Pilot)
- McKinley Preparatory High School
- Ruth Batson Academy (Pilot)
- Muriel S. Snowden International School at Copley
- New Mission High School (Pilot)
- Newcomers Academy (For students who are recent immigrants not yet proficient in English)

=== K-12 schools ===
- Carter Development Center
- Horace Mann School for the Deaf and Hard of Hearing
- Dr. William W. Henderson K-12 Inclusion School

=== Exam schools ===
The following schools serve students in grades 7–12 and admit students based on their grades and the Independent School Entrance Examination.

- John D. O'Bryant School of Mathematics & Science
- Boston Latin School
- Boston Latin Academy

=== Former Boston public schools ===
- Aaron Davis School
- Abby W. May School
- Abraham Lincoln School (now Josiah Quincy School)
- Alexander Hamilton Elementary School (closed in 2010, now Baiis Yaakov of Boston High School)
- Boston Technical High School
- Boston Trade High School
- Clarence R. Edwards Middle School (closed in 2021, seventh and eighth grade departments moved to Charlestown High School)
- Copley Square High School
- David Farragut School (K-5, established in 1904 and closed in 2011)
- Dorchester High School
- High School of Commerce
- Hyde Park High School
- Jackson/Mann K-8 School (closed in 2022)
- Jamaica Plain High School
- James P. Timilty Middle School (closed in 2022)
- John W. McCormack Middle School (merged with Boston Community Leadership Academy in 2021)
- Louis Agassiz Elementary School (closed in 2011)
- McKinley Elementary (renamed Melvin H. King South End Academy in 2023)
- Mechanics Arts High School
- Middle School Academy (Alternative school) (closed in 2015)
- Mission Hill School (Pilot, closed in 2022)
- Odyssey High School (closed in 2011, Now Boston Green Academy)
- Patrick F. Gavin School (closed in 2011, now UP Academy)
- Philbricks Elementary (merged with Sumner Elementary in the Washington Irving to become the Sarah Roberts Elementary School)
- Robert Treat Paine School
- Rogers Middle School (closed in 2015)
- Roslindale High School (closed in 1976)
- Roxbury Memorial High School (Now Boston Latin Academy)
- South Boston High School (Now Excel South Boston High School)
- Sumner Elementary (Merged with Philbricks Elementary at the Washington Irving to become Sarah Roberts Elementary)
- Washington Irving Middle School (closed 2022)
- West Roxbury Education Complex (closed 2019)

== See also ==
- METCO
