= Laval Wilson =

American educator

Laval Steele Wilson is an American educator who served as superintendent of the Berkeley Unified School District, the Rochester City School District, Boston Public Schools, Paterson Public Schools, the Newburgh Enlarged City School District, East Orange School District, and the Poughkeepsie City School District. He was Rochester and Boston's first black superintendent.

== Early life ==
Wilson grew up in Chicago. Both of his parents were teachers and he was raised by his mother, Emma Dee Steele, after his father, Edward DeSoto Wilson, died when Wilson was five years old. He graduated from Chicago Teachers College in 1958 and earned a master's degree in educational administration from the University of Chicago in 1962 and a PhD in educational administration from Northwestern University in 1967.

== Career ==
=== Early career ===
Wilson began his teaching career in 1958 in Chicago Public Schools. From 1965 to 1966 he was the assistant director of Northwestern University's summer institute for teachers of disadvantaged youth. He then joined the Evanston/Skokie School District, where he served as principal of Oakton School for one year before becoming the principal of the Central School. In 1967 and 1968 he also directed the district's integration institutes for teachers. From 1970 to 1971 he participated in a minority administrative internship program sponsored by the Rockefeller Foundation.

In 1971, Wilson became the assistant superintendent for curriculum and instruction in Hempstead, New York. From 1973 to 1974 he was Hempstead's acting superintendent. In 1974 he was named superintendent of the Berkeley Unified School District. He held this position until 1980 when the school board voted 3 to 2 not to renew his contract.

=== Rochester ===
In 1980, Wilson was named the superintendent of the Rochester City School District. He was Rochester's first black superintendent. In Rochester, Wilson dealt with the aftermath of the city's first teachers' strike and a major fiscal crisis that forced the closing of 10 schools. However, Wilson was credited with raising test scores, imposing discipline, and improving the district's image.

=== Boston ===
On July 31, 1985, the Boston School Committee voted 9 to 4 to name Wilson superintendent of school. He was the city's first black and first minority superintendent. During his tenure in Boston, Wilson dealt with the end of W. Arthur Garrity Jr.'s involvement in Boston's school desegregation, budget cuts, a near bus drivers strike, fires that damaged two school buildings, and the AIDS epidemic. Under Wilson, test scores improved moderately, the dropout rate decreased modestly, and improvements were made to school buildings. In 1987, the school committee rejected a school merger plan developed by Wilson. After Wilson threatened to resign, the proposal was reconsidered and adopted by a 7 to 6 vote.

On April 11, 1989, the committee voted 7 to 6 to give Wilson a two-year extension. On February 13, 1990, the school committee voted 7 to 1 to buy out the final year of Wilson's, with four black members and one white of the committee walking out before the vote, as they believed Wilson's ouster was racially motivated.

=== Paterson ===
In 1991, the New Jersey Department of Education appointed Wilson to lead the Paterson Public Schools after the district was taken over by the state. Wilson was able to add libraries to 21 elementary schools and 30 computer labs to schools and was credited with proposing innovative programs and bringing fiscal accountability to the district. However, little progress was seen in students' standardized test scores.

=== Later career ===
In 1997, Wilson left Paterson for Newburgh, New York. In October 2000, Wilson was charged with DWI after he crashed a school vehicle on Interstate 84 in New Jersey. On November 29, 2000, Wilson announced that he would resign due to the arrest. On September 10, 2001, Wilson pleaded guilty to driving while intoxicated and was fined $500.

In 2002, Wilson was appointed to a five-member board that oversaw the Roosevelt Union Free School District after it was taken over by the state of New York. From 2003 to 2006 he was the superintendent of the East Orange School District in East Orange, New Jersey.

On April 26, 2006, Wilson was hired by the Poughkeepsie City School District. He took over as superintendent on July 1, 2006. He remained in Poughkeepsie until his retirement in 2013.

Academic offices
Preceded by John M. Franco	Superintendent of the Rochester City School District; 1980–1985	Succeeded by Peter J. McWalters
Preceded by Robert R. Spillane	Superintendent of Boston Public Schools; 1985–1990	Succeeded by Lois Harrison-Jones
Preceded by Robert C. Watson Sr.	Superintendent of the Poughkeepsie City School District; 2006–2013	Succeeded by Nicole Williams
