= Bill C. Davis =

American playwright and actor (1951–2021)

- Born: William Clarke Davis; August 24, 1951; Ellenville, New York, U.S.
- Died: February 26, 2021 (aged 69); Torrington, Connecticut, U.S.
- Occupations: Playwright, actor
- Writing career
- Period: 1980–2021

William Clarke Davis (August 24, 1951 – February 26, 2021) was an American playwright and actor. He was best known for his 1980 play Mass Appeal. Other noted works of his include Dancing in the End Zone, Wrestlers, Spine, Avow, Coming2Terms, All Hallowed, Jeremiah Rules, Expatriate, and Austin's Bridge.

== Early life ==
Davis was born in Ellenville, New York, on August 24, 1951. His family was of Italian, Irish and Eastern European descent. His father, Warren, initially ran a men's clothing store and later on became a teacher. He had been captured by the Germans while fighting in World War II. His mother, Terry, was employed as an executive assistant at Vassar College and also worked at a boarding school. Davis attended Our Lady of Lourdes High School in Poughkeepsie, and wrote his first play when he was sixteen years old. He went on to study at Marist College, graduating in 1974.

After graduation, Davis worked at Rhinebeck Country Village, a residential community for developmentally disabled and emotionally disturbed adults. He wrote Mass Appeal during his time at Rhinebeck, which he said he "began to understand human nature" through his outreach to the individuals living there.

== Career ==
Mass Appeal debuted at the Manhattan Theatre Club (MTC) in the spring of 1980. It was well-received, with Frank Rich of The New York Times writing how the play "quickly deepens into a wise, moving and very funny comedy about the nature of friendship, courage and all kinds of love". He described Davis as "a natural [who] writes with wit, passion and a sure sense of stagecraft". It shifted to Broadway the following year, ultimately running for 212 performances at the Booth Theatre. Director Geraldine Fitzgerald and Milo O'Shea (who played the main character) were both nominated for Tony Awards, while Davis himself was nominated for the Drama Desk Award for Outstanding Play in 1981. Mass Appeal also won the Outer Critics Circle Award for best play, as well as the Molière Award. It was adapted as a film of the same name three years later and featured Jack Lemmon and Željko Ivanek.

Davis utilized the royalties and the film sale of Mass Appeal towards producing other plays. This included Dancing in the End Zone, which opened in 1985 and ran for only three weeks. It turned out to be his only other Broadway production. He also authored Wrestlers, which ran that same year in Los Angeles. He went on to write All Hallowed, which was based on his father's interment on Halloween in 1995 and the persistence of Davis' nephew to carry on trick-or-treating that same night. One year later, his play Avow had its world premiere at the George Street Playhouse in New Brunswick, New Jersey. It proceeded to run off-Broadway for one month in 2000, before debuting in Paris.

Davis was the Artist-in-Residence at Marist College (his alma mater) from 2010 to 2011. There, he taught the course "Advanced Playwriting" and held workshops on the business of theatre to upper-level theatre students. He was also playwright-in-residence at the MTC and Brooklyn College, as well as Playwright Mentor at Carnegie Mellon University. He was the writer, director, and producer of two independent films, Household Accounts and Avow, that he also acted in. They were released in 2018, three years before his death; the latter film was an adaptation of his play.

Davis was the recipient of several awards, including the Los Angeles Times Critic's Choice Award, a National Board of Review citation, and the Drama-Logue Award. He was conferred the Marist College President's Award in 1981, for his "distinguished achievement in American theatre and the arts". He was later inducted into his alma mater's Theatre Hall of Fame in 2016.

== Personal life ==
Davis was gay and remained a lifelong bachelor. He joined the Green Party and made a brief run for Congress in 2005 for Connecticut. He was a regular contributor to Common Dreams. He called for a ban on Coca-Cola and Pepsi, and spoke out against fast food restaurants, sugar, and processed foods in November 2020.

Davis died on February 26, 2021, at a care center in Torrington, Connecticut. He was 69, and had been diagnosed with COVID-19 and pancreatic cancer one month prior to his death.

== Sources ==
- Bill C. Davis, whose play 'Mass Appeal' lived up to its title, dies at 69
- Biography at billcdavis.com
- Bill C. Davis
