= John E. Fenton =

John E. Fenton (1898-1974) was a judge and president of Suffolk University in Boston, Massachusetts from 1965 to 1970.

John E. Fenton, Sr. was born in Lawrence, Massachusetts in 1898 and graduated from the College of the Holy Cross and then from Boston College Law School in 1924 with a Juris Doctor. Fenton taught at Lawrence High School while attending the Suffolk Evening Division. Fenton served on the Suffolk University Board of Trustees for sixteen years before serving as president of the university from 1965 to 1970. He had previously served as the Chief Justice of the Massachusetts Land Court from 1937 to 1965. Fenton's son, John E. Fenton, Jr. was also a judge and a professor at Suffolk Law School for over fifty years. The John E. Fenton building at Suffolk University is named in President Fenton's honor. Fenton served as national president of the Ancient Order of Hibernians in 1935 and Grand Exalted Ruler of the Benevolent and Protective Order of Elks in 1960.

Legal offices
Preceded by Michael A. Sullivan	Chief Justice of the Massachusetts Land Court; 1937–1965	Succeeded by Elwood H. Hettrick
Academic offices
Preceded by Dennis C. Haley	President of the Suffolk University; 1965–1970	Succeeded by Thomas Fulham
