= William H. Ohrenberger =

American educator

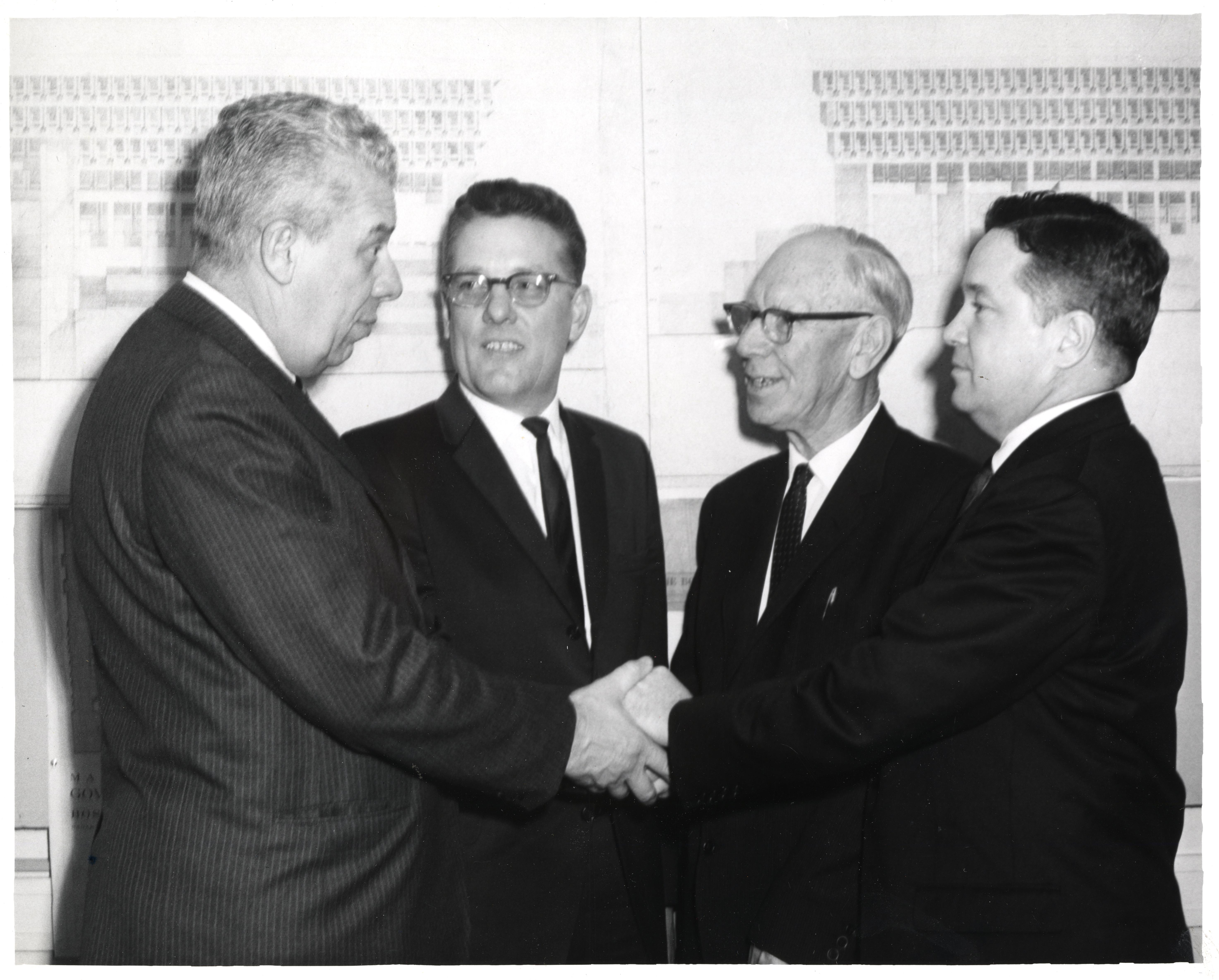
- Ohrenberger (center) with three unidentified men

Superintendent of Boston Public Schools
- In office 1963–1972
- Preceded by: Frederick Gillis
- Succeeded by: William J. Leary

Personal details
- Born: August 23, 1906 Boston
- Died: November 13, 1998 (aged 92) Boston
- Resting place: St. Joseph Cemetery; West Roxbury

William Henry Ohrenberger (August 23, 1906 – November 13, 1998) was an American educator who served as superintendent of Boston Public Schools from 1963 to 1972.

== Early life ==
Ohrenberger was born on August 23, 1906. He graduated from The English High School in 1923 and Boston College in 1927. He played tackle for the Boston College Eagles football team and was a member of the undefeated 1926 Boston College Eagles football team. He earned a master's in education from Boston College in 1929.

== Coaching ==
Ohrenberger was a teacher and coach at St. Thomas High School in Jamaica Plain from 1927 to 1929 and Georgetown Preparatory School from 1929 to 1930. In 1931 he was the line coach at Boston College. He then spent the next fifteen years as a teacher and head football coach at The English High School.

== School administration ==
In 1945, Ohrenberger was named Boston Public Schools' assistant director of physical education. In 1953 he was promoted to associate director. In 1954, Ohrenberger was the unanimous choice for assistant superintendent of schools. In 1960 he was a finalist for the position of school superintendent, but removed himself from consideration and backed Frederick Gillis for the job. Gillis promoted Ohrenberger to deputy superintendent, a position that had been vacant since 1951.

== Superintendent of schools ==
Gillis retired in 1963 and there was a strong push for an outsider to succeed him. Consultant Herold C. Hunt recommended five candidates from outside the school district (New York deputy superintendent Bernard Donovan, Newark superintendent Edward Kenneally, Bridgeport superintendent Joseph Porter, Des Moines superintendent John Harris, Davenport superintendent Anthony Marinaccio). Ohrenberger was the only internal candidate seriously considered for the job, which had not gone to an outsider since 1917. On October 10, 1963, the school committee voted 3 to 1 to appoint Ohrenberger, with Louise Day Hicks, Thomas S. Eisenstadt, and Joseph Lee voting for Ohrenberger. Arthur Gartland voted for Joseph Porter. The board's fifth member, William O'Connor, was unable to attend the meeting, but like Gartland supported hiring an outside candidate.

On April 1, 1965, a special committee appointed by Massachusetts Education Commissioner Owen Kiernan released its final report finding that more than half of black students enrolled in Boston Public Schools (BPS) attended institutions with enrollments that were at least 80 percent black and that housing segregation in the city had caused the racial imbalance. In August 1965 Governor John Volpe signed The Racial Imbalance Act of 1965 into law. The act defined schools with nonwhite enrollments greater than 50% to be imbalanced and granted the State Board of Education the power to withhold funds from any district that was found to have racial imbalance, which Volpe would sign into law the following August. Throughout Ohrenberger's tenure as superintendent, the Boston School Committee consistently disobeyed orders from the state Board of Education, first to develop a busing plan, and then to support its implementation. By 1972 the number of racially imbalanced schools in Boston had increased from 46 to 67. On March 14, 1972, the Boston chapter of the NAACP filed a class action lawsuit against the Boston School Committee on behalf of 14 black parents and 44 children. The case, which would not be ruled on until after Ohrenberger had left office, found that the city had contributed to the "establishment of a dual school system," one for each race.

In 1972, Boston school committee chairman James W. Hennigan Jr. informed Ohrenberger that the committee had unanimously agreed to appoint a superintendent that would be able to complete a six year term, which Ohrenberger would not be able to do due his approaching the mandatory retirement age of 70.

== Personal life ==
Ohrenberger was the father of six children. His first wife, Cecelia (Gallagher) Ohrenberger, died in 1953. His second wife, Clare P. (Doyle) Ohrenberger, was a Boston public schools secretary. She died in 1993 of chronic obstructive pulmonary disease at age 68.

Ohrenberger spent his retirement in Scituate, Massachusetts. He died on November 13, 1998, at Carney Hospital after a brief illness. He was 92 years old. He is buried in St. Joseph Cemetery in West Roxbury.
