= Dennis C. Haley =

President of Suffolk University from 1960 to 1965

4th President of Suffolk University
- In office 1960–1965
- Preceded by: Robert Munce
- Succeeded by: John E. Fenton

Superintendent of Boston Public Schools
- In office 1948–1960
- Preceded by: Arthur L. Gould
- Succeeded by: Frederick Gillis

Personal details
- Born: Dennis Curran Haley; August 16, 1893 Warren, Massachusetts, U.S.
- Died: July 26, 1966 (aged 72) Falmouth, Massachusetts, U.S.
- Spouse: Margaret Casey (m. 1927)
- Parent(s): William T. Haley; Margaret C. Curran
- Education: College of the Holy Cross (BA, MA); Harvard University (EdM)
- Profession: Educator

Dennis Curran Haley (August 16, 1893 – July 26, 1966) was president of Suffolk University in Boston, Massachusetts, from 1960 to 1965.

== Early life and education ==
Haley was born on August 16, 1893, in Warren, Massachusetts, to William T. Haley and Margaret C. Curran. He received his A.B. in 1915 from the College of the Holy Cross, his A.M. from Holy Cross in 1922, and his Ed.M. from Harvard University in 1925. He graduated from the Boston Normal School in 1916. He was also a student at the Boston University School of Education from 1919 to 1924 and Boston College School of Education from 1923 to 1932. Haley married Margaret Casey, a fellow teacher, in August 1927.

== Career ==
Haley began his teaching career in 1916 at Roxbury High School and was promoted to junior master in 1919. In 1924 he became a science professor at the Boston Teachers' College and in 1926 was promoted to head of the science department. Haley authored and edited various scientific articles and co-authored a science textbook. In 1934 he was named headmaster of Hyde Park High School. In 1940 he was made acting assistant superintendent of schools and received the job on a permanent basis the following year.

Haley served as Boston Public School Superintendent from 1948 until being selected as president of Suffolk University in 1960. During his tenure as superintendent, Haley organized a $60 million building program and established a central administration. At Suffolk he laid the groundwork for the school's new six-story, $3 million dollar building, which opened in September 1966. He retired from Suffolk 1965. Haley died on July 26, 1966, in his summer home in Falmouth, Massachusetts. The Dennis C. Haley Elementary School is named after Haley.

Academic offices
Preceded by Arthur L. Gould	Superintendent of Boston Public Schools; 1948–1960	Succeeded by Frederick Gillis
Preceded by Robert Munce	President of the Suffolk University; 1960–1965	Succeeded by John E. Fenton
