= Eliot K-8 Innovation School =

Public school in Boston

John Eliot K-8 Innovation School

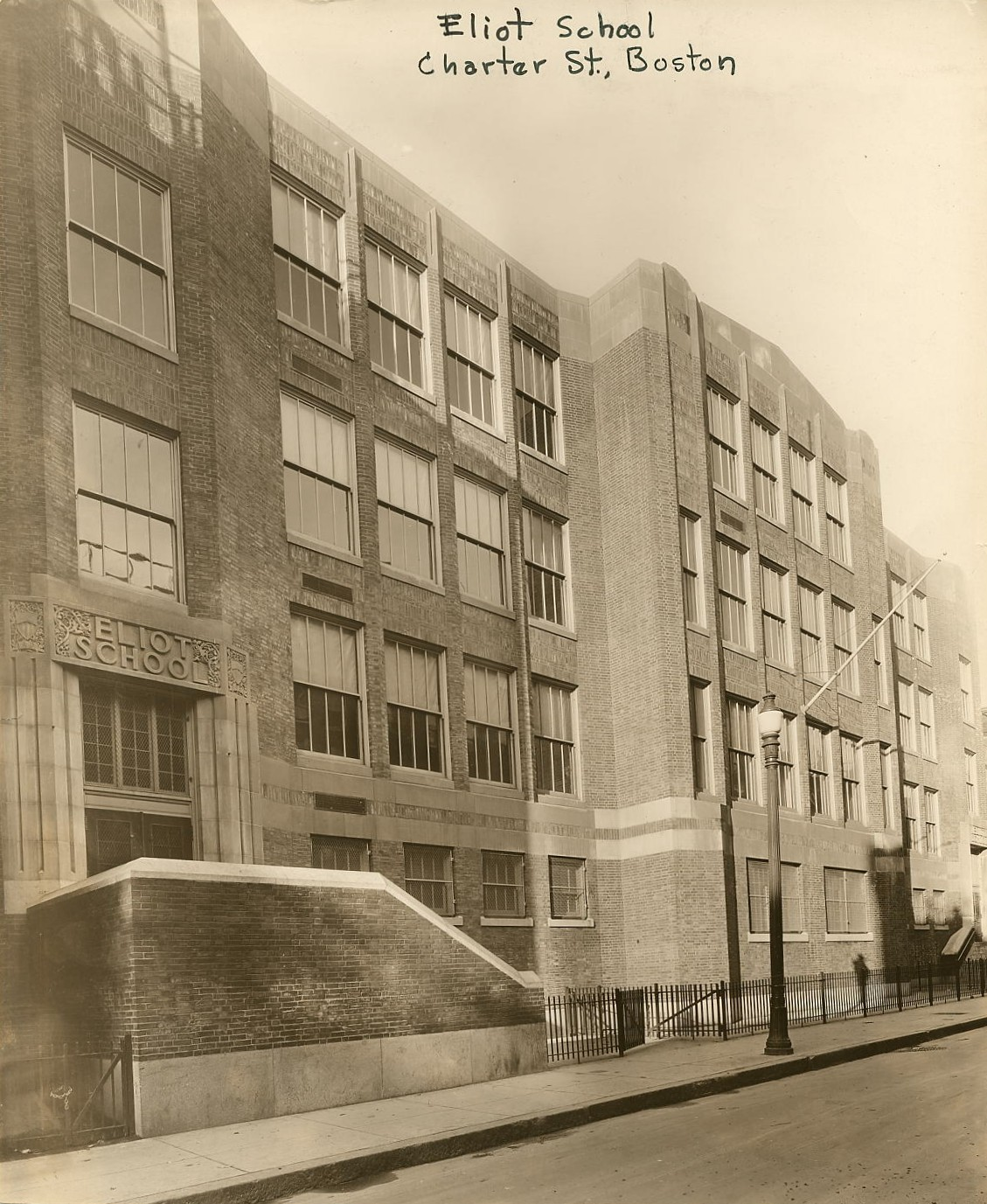
- The Eliot School from the Boston City Archives.
- Lower School: 16 Charter Street, Boston, MA 02113 Intermediate School: 173 Salem Street, Boston, MA 02113 Upper School: 585 Commercial Street, Boston, MA 02109

Information
- Other names: Eliot Innovation School, Eliot School
- School type: Public School
- Established: c. 1713
- School district: Boston Public Schools
- NCES School ID: 250279000230
- Principal: Traci Walker Griffith
- Head of School, G5-G8: Aliza Moschella
- Head of School, K0-G4: Holly McPartlin
- Student to teacher ratio: 13.38:1
- Language: English
- Campuses: Lower School, Intermediate School, Upper School
- Color
- Feeder to: Boston Latin School
- Website: https://eliotk8school.org/

The Eliot K-8 Innovation School (also known as the Eliot Innovation School, John Eliot K-8 Innovation School, or simply the Eliot School) is a public K–8 school in Boston, Massachusetts. It is situated in the North End, a part of the city which has a large Italian-American population. It is listed as an innovation school by Boston Public Schools. The school serves students from kindergarten through eighth grade and operates within the Boston Public Schools district. It was established in 1713, making it one of the oldest public schools in the United States.

It has three campuses - Lower, Intermediate, and Upper School - separating lower grades and upper grades. It is an innovation and technology-based school.

== History ==
=== Origins and early development ===
The Eliot K–8 Innovation School was originally established in 1713 under the name the "North Writing School" on Queen Street, North End. At the time, writing schools were created to provide basic language education to children in the surrounding community. The North Writing School taught local families and children of the North End for much of the 18th century and played an important role in the early development of public education in Boston.

In 1790, the North Writing School merged with the North Latin School, which traditionally focused on classical studies such as the Latin language and preparation for higher education (similar to Boston Latin School). After this merger, the school adopted the name "Eliot", named after pastor John Eliot, in the Old North Church in the North End.

=== 1800s ===
==== Eliot School rebellion ====
In the 19th century, the Eliot School was the site of the Eliot School rebellion, a controversy involving religious practices in public education. In 1859, a Catholic student was whipped for refusing to recite the Ten Commandments from the King James version of the Holy Bible (following Massachusetts law), reflecting major religious tensions in Boston at the time. Following the Abington School District v. Schempp case decision regarding daily Bible recitations, the school is now secular and no longer affiliated with any religion.

=== 2000s ===
In the early 2000s, Eliot faced a period of poor academic performance. Expectations for grades were not met, and the school was facing the possibility of closure due to underperformance. During this period, concerns about enrollment, achievement levels, and overall school climate prompted local community discussions about restructuring.

In 2012, the Eliot Innovation School completed an $11.3 million land swap with the vocational school North Bennet Street School. The 4 buildings Eliot received from the City of Boston were converted to the former Eliot Upper School. It was said to mark the start of growing demand for quality public schools in Boston. The Upper School was moved and renovated later in the same decade.

Beginning in 2024, changing student demographics by race raised concerns with respect to the ethnic and racial diversity of the student body at Eliot. Given the school district's history with segregation, including the desegregation busing crisis in the 1970s, this led to critics using the changing racial demographics of enrolled students as evidence of "resegregation" in Boston schools. These criticisms highlighted the majority enrollment of white students at Eliot, in combination with higher standardized testing scores and better academic performance overall.

As of 2026, the Eliot K–8 Innovation School operates across multiple campuses. According to WBUR and school sources, the number of applicants exceeds the number of available seats.

== Academics ==
Courses offered at Eliot range from the arts (Visual, Media Arts, Music, Theater), languages (English, Italian), STEM (computer science, robotics), and physical education. There are also extracurricular and after-school activities offered.

The three campuses - Lower, Intermediate, and Upper - hold different grade levels. Lower school offers K0 to G1, Intermediate school offers G2 to G4, and Upper school offers G5 to G8.

According to the U.S. News and World Report, the Eliot K-8 Innovation School is ranked among the top public elementary schools in Massachusetts.

	2019	2020	2021	2022	2023	2024
State average (E)	52		46	41	42	39
Boston average (E)	35		31	29	29	27
Eliot combined	72.5		69.5	68.5	71.5	71.5
State combined	50.5		39.5	40	41.5	40
Boston combined	34		25.5	26.5	27.5	26.5

(Note: Data for the year 2020 is unavailable, likely due to COVID-19.)

=== Student Body ===
The school enrolled 779 students during the 2025–26 school year. Over 63.5% of the student body is White.

Enrollment by Race/Ethnicity (2025–26)
Race	% of School	% of District	% of State
American Indian or Alaska Native	0.1	0.3	0.2
Asian	7.8	8.0	7.6
Black or African American	5.1	28.9	10.4
Hispanic or Latino	16.0	44.4	26.2
Multi-Race, Not Hispanic or Latino	7.2	3.9	4.8
Native Hawaiian or Other Pacific Islander	0.1	0.1	0.1
White	63.5	14.5	50.8

(Taken from the Massachusetts School and District Profiles)

Enrollment by Grade (2025–26)
	PK	K	1	2	3	4	5	6	7	8	9	10	11	12	SP	Total
District	2,621	3,248	3,345	3,304	3,338	3,323	2,905	2,869	2,834	2,895	3,140	3,281	3,430	3,677	206	44,416
Eliot K-8 Innovation School	96	80	82	83	84	91	95	91	33	44	0	0	0	0	0	779

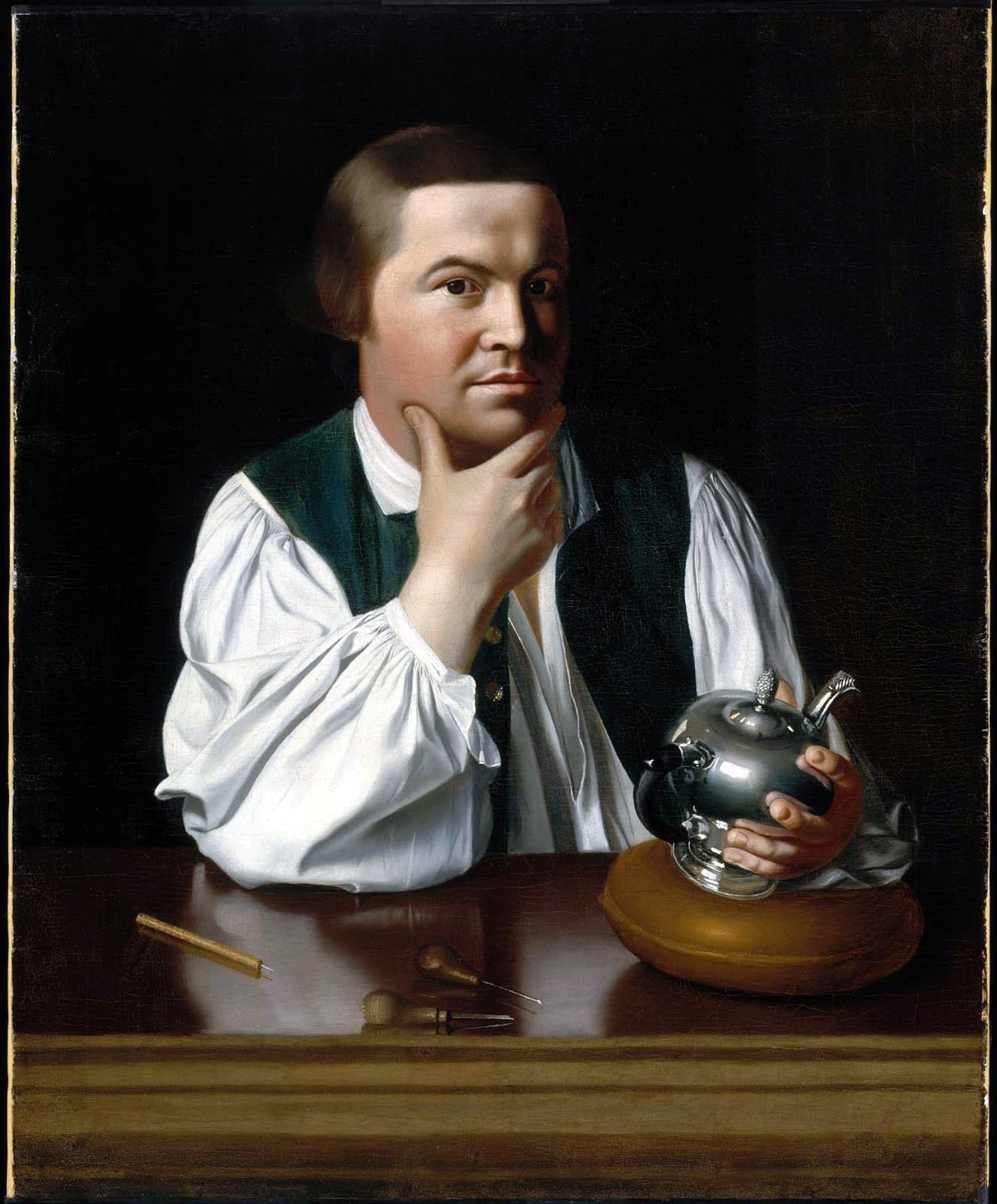
American patriot Paul Revere

(Taken from the Massachusetts School and District Profiles)

=== Administration ===
The principal of Eliot K–8 Innovation School is Traci Walker Griffith. She has worked at the school for 17 years. She is currently scheduled to retire at the end of the 2025–2026 school year. Holly McPartlin is the head of school for grades K0 to G4. Aliza Moschella is the head of school for grades G5 to G8. The Eliot K-8 Innovation School also has a community family board that supports school initiatives.

=== Notable alumni ===
Eliot K-8 Innovation School is reported to have educated Paul Revere, a silversmith and American patriot known for his role in the American Revolution. Paul Revere's silhouette is present in the school's official logo.

The Eliot K-8 Innovation School is also a feeder school to Boston Latin School, a magnet public high school in Boston.

== Public attention ==
In 2019, the Upper School campus was renovated, which drew attention to the city because of the new designs.

During the COVID-19 pandemic in 2020, the school was the first in Boston to close down and switch to Zoom for classes after someone tested positive while on campus. Other schools were shut down by Mayor Walsh following the shutdown of Eliot.

In 2023, a Youth Risk Behavior Survey conducted at the school included sexually explicit content in its survey, which resulted in public criticism from parents and the community.

== See also ==
- Boston Public Schools
- Public school system
