= Mass Appeal (film) =

1984 film by Glenn Jordan

- Original poster
- Directed by: Glenn Jordan
- Screenplay by: Bill C. Davis
- Based on: Mass Appeal by Bill C. Davis
- Produced by: Lawrence Turman; David Foster
- Starring: Jack Lemmon; Željko Ivanek; Charles Durning
- Cinematography: Donald Peterman
- Edited by: John Wright
- Music by: Bill Conti
- Production companies: Operation Cork Productions; Turman-Foster Company
- Distributed by: Universal Pictures
- Release date: December 6, 1984
- Running time: 99 minutes
- Country: United States
- Language: English
- Box office: $1,945,658

Mass Appeal is a 1984 American comedy-drama film directed by Glenn Jordan and starring Jack Lemmon, Željko Ivanek, and Charles Durning. The screenplay by Bill C. Davis is based on his 1980 play.

== Plot ==
For years, as pastor of an affluent, suburban Catholic parish, Father Tim Farley has maintained a close relationship with his congregation by delivering folksy homilies filled with practical advice and adhering to clerical policies without waver. One Sunday, his sermon is interrupted by seminarian Mark Dolson, who questions Farley's position on the ordination of women. The older priest charmingly sidesteps the young man but is annoyed that he was placed in an uncomfortable position.

Dolson defends two seminarians who were expelled after being suspected of engaging in a homosexual relationship. After he is ordained a deacon, frustrated Monsignor Thomas Burke assigns him to Farley's parish in the hope the older man will inspire him to toe the line and become more complacent. Although in some ways conservative—he criticizes his sister Liz for her affair with a married man—the young man is primarily a liberal firebrand who is anxious to make changes in the church, whereas Farley prefers to study with a bottle of alcohol and not make waves.

The pastor tries to become a mentor to his new charge, but Dolson ignores the priest's efforts to teach him the necessity of tact. He enrages the congregation with his first, highly critical sermon.

Questions as to why Dolson defended the gay seminarians arise. He confides having spent two years engaging in sexual relations with both men and women, saying he now is committed to celibacy. Farley urges him to keep quiet about his past, but the deacon admits his secret to the monsignor and is expelled.

Farley promises to convince his followers that the church needs liberal thinkers who do not always do things by the book. As soon as he senses he is losing support, however, the priest backs down. Dolson angrily confronts him with a feeling of betrayal, forcing Farley to rethink his position and do the right thing, even if it means the loss of his parish.

== Cast ==
- Jack Lemmon - Father Tim Farley
- Željko Ivanek - Deacon Mark Dolson
- Charles Durning - Monsignor Thomas Burke
- Louise Latham - Margaret
- Talia Balsam - Liz Dolson

== Critical reception ==
Janet Maslin of The New York Times compared the film to Educating Rita, although she found it to be "less strident . . . and more prone to dry humor." She added, "The momentum of Mr. Davis's drama and the stars' intensity are enough to sustain interest, even when Glenn Jordan's television-style direction seems excessively bland. The casting of the two key roles works in the long run, but it initially seems a shade off. Father Farley, as written, is rather too self-satisfied and facile for the priesthood, qualities better emphasized in Milo O'Shea's stage performance than in Mr. Lemmon's on film, since the character's glibness comes too close to the actor's usual screen persona. And Mr. Ivanek, beginning on a note of intelligence and severity, later has moments of surprisingly callowness, even petulance. But the stars work together very effectively, making the story's progress believable as each of their characters evolves into a better man. Mass Appeal doesn't have to tug too hard at the audience's heartstrings to arrive at its simple and satisfying resolution."
