= Patrick T. Campbell =

American educator

- c. 1918

10th Superintendent of Boston Public Schools
- In office 1931 – February 12, 1937
- Preceded by: Jeremiah E. Burke
- Succeeded by: Arthur L. Gould

Personal details
- Born: Patrick Thomas Campbell; April 14, 1871 Jersey City, New Jersey, U.S.
- Died: February 12, 1937 (aged 65)
- Spouse: Edith Hayes (m. 1899)
- Children: 2
- Parents: Thomas Campbell (father); Mary Houghton Campbell (mother)
- Education: Boston Latin School; Harvard College
- Profession: Educator

Patrick Thomas Campbell (April 14, 1871 – February 12, 1937) was an American educator who served as superintendent of Boston Public Schools from 1931 to 1937.

== Early life ==
At Harvard, c. 1893

Campbell was born on April 14, 1871, in Jersey City, New Jersey, to Thomas and Mary Houghton Campbell. Both of his parents were from East Boston. His father was a shipwright and a lack of jobs in the Boston shipyards after the Civil War caused the Campbells to move to New Jersey. Thomas Campbell died in 1872 and his mother returned to East Boston to live with family. He graduated from Boston Latin School in 1889 and Harvard College in 1893. He worked his way through school as an assistant janitor at the Adams Grammar School. In 1899 he married Edith Hayes. They had two children, a son, Thomas, who followed his father into teaching, and a daughter, Edith.

== Career ==
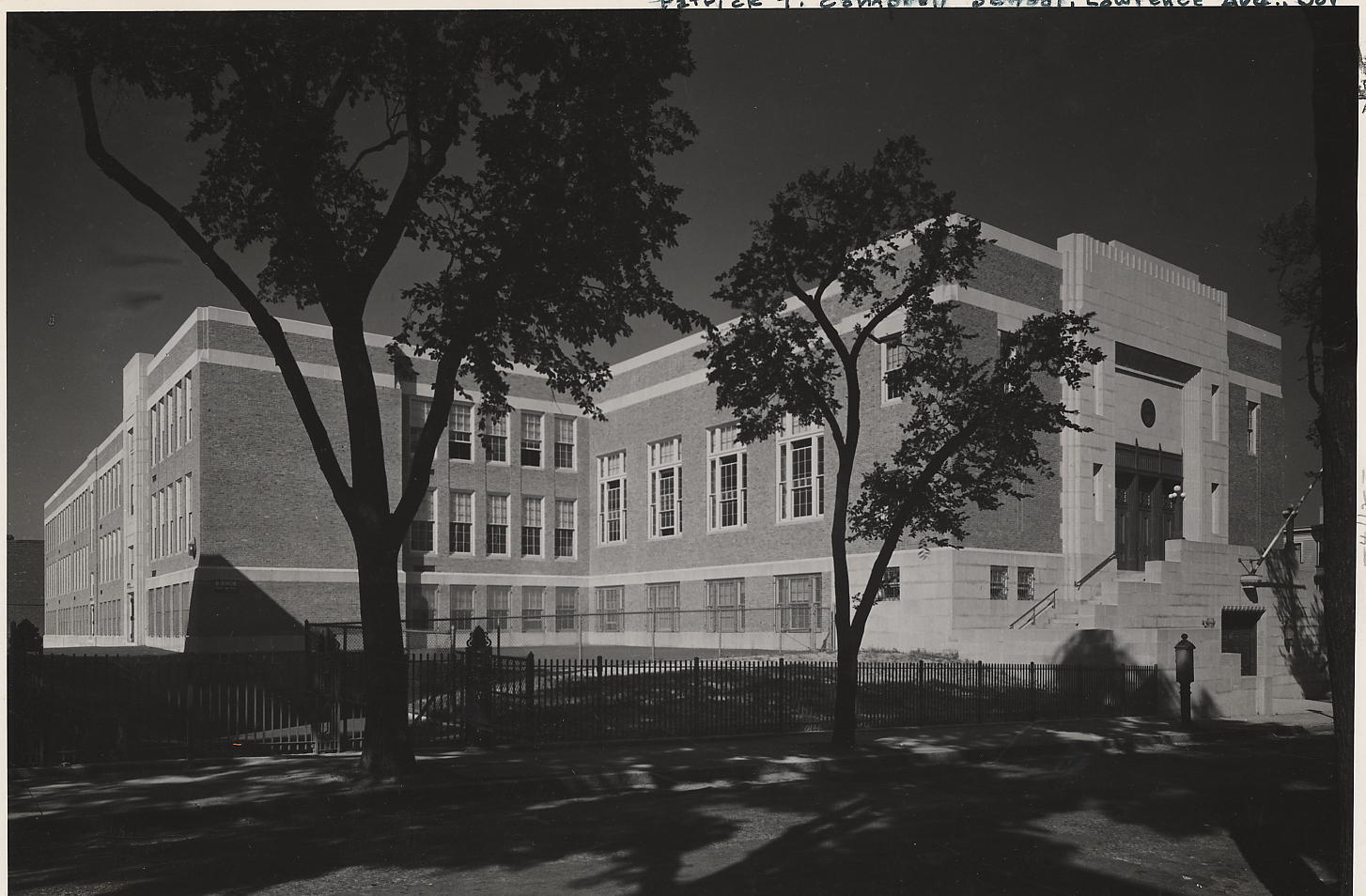
Patrick T. Campbell School

In 1893, Campbell began his teaching career in the Medford Public Schools. In 1897 he became a junior master, Latin and history teacher, and athletic supervisor at Boston Latin. In 1908 he became head of the history department. In 1920 he was appointed headmaster of Boston Latin. During his tenure as headmaster, the average success rate of the Latin's students in the college entrance board exam jumped from 73.4% to 91.4% and the school's students had the highest weighted average at the examination for four consecutive years. While teaching at Boston Latin, Campbell also taught history at Boston College's Graduate School of Education and Boston University and a course in secondary school administration at the Boston Teachers College. In 1929 he was appointed assistant superintendent of Boston Public Schools.

In 1931, Campbell was appointed superintendent of schools following the death of Jeremiah E. Burke. In 1936, Campbell was unanimously reappointed to a six-year term despite opposition from a group of teachers. On February 12, 1937, Campbell died of a heart attack in his sleep. He was the third consecutive superintendent to die unexpectedly while holding the office. His funeral was moved to the Cathedral of the Holy Cross because it was the only Catholic church large enough to hold the thousands of mourners who turned out. He was buried in St. Joseph Cemetery. In 1937 the Patrick T. Campbell Intermediate School in Dorchester was named in honor of Campbell, however the school was renamed in honor of Martin Luther King Jr. after his assassination in 1968.

Educational offices
Preceded by Jeremiah E. Burke	Superintendent of Boston Public Schools; 1931–1937	Succeeded by Arthur L. Gould
