= Poughkeepsie City School District =

School district in the U.S. state of New York

Address
- Jane Bolin Administration Building - 11 College Ave, Poughkeepsie, NY 12603 Poughkeepsie, NY Dutchess County; United States

District information
- Type: Public
- Grades: Pre-K to 12
- Established: 1843
- Superintendent: Dr. Eric Jay Rosser
- Budget: $94,784,944 (16-17)

Students and staff
- Students: 4,714
- Teachers: 400
- Staff: 850
- Colors: Blue/White

Other information
- Website: www.poughkeepsieschools.org

Poughkeepsie City School District is located in Dutchess County, New York. Approximately 75 miles north of New York City, the school district is situated on the banks of the Hudson River in an area known as the Mid Hudson Valley.

The district is coterminous with the boundaries of the City of Poughkeepsie. is approximately 5 square miles in size, and is composed of six elementary schools, one middle school, one high school, one community learning center (formerly an alternative school), and one administration building. The district provides educational programs for nearly 5,000 students. The school population is a diverse mix of African-American, Latino, Caucasian and Asian students.

There are approximately 850 professional and support staff members employed by the district, of whom over 400 are teaching staff. The district operates with a budget exceeding $80,000,000. Taxes and other local revenues account for approximately 40% of the budget, with the remaining 60% generated through State Formula Aid and Small City Aid.

== History ==
The beginning

Public education began in Poughkeepsie in 1843, when a village board of education was created by the State legislature. This twelve-member Board was authorized to borrow money and raise taxes to build one school house and rent school rooms in five other sites. Between 1843 and 1844, the board opened seven grammar schools, one of them a ‘Colored School', which was continued until 1875. The first free school was built on the corner of Mill and Bridge Streets. All other schools were housed in rented facilities and served approximately 760 children. In 1856, a new school building was constructed on Church Street, with the second floor used to offer a high school program. This high school opened in 1857, and in 1863 held its first commencement exercises.

Between 1858 and 1875, additional grammar schools were built on Church Street, Union Square, North Clinton Street and upper Cannon Street. The high school was discontinued for one year in 1865, but reopened in 1866 in rented space in the Dutchess Academy, a private school on the corner of South Hamilton and Montgomery Streets that apparently merged with the public high school. This building was later sold by its trustees, with proceeds from the sale donated to the board of education to finance building a new High School, which opened in April, 1872, on the corner of Washington and Lafayette Streets.

1901–1929, the period of great development

The school system began a thirty-year building program at the beginning of the 20th century that continued until the Depression. During this period, the city grew rapidly, its population swelled by immigrants from European countries. Those who came to work in the city factories near the river created a need for residential expansion. New neighborhoods were built on inland areas previously used for agricultural purposes. Shifts in population density and the increase in the number of city residents made it necessary to build new schools away from the original city center near the river. Many of the original school buildings in the Poughkeepsie City School District were built during this period.

A large influx of children from non-English speaking backgrounds happened around this time, many of whom had a large impact on school organization and curriculum. Teaching pupils proper “habits and attitudes” to overcome the influence of “home and the streets” began to be considered a necessary adjunct to academic instruction, as the schools took up the charge to socialize students from diverse cultures to the American way of life. As schools adopted the industrial model of organizational efficiency; the instructional emphasis swung away from oral recitation and widening pupils’ perceptions of the world around them toward “scientific” organization through measurement of intelligence with standardized I.Q. tests, grammar school ability grouping, curriculum based on textbooks and structured course outlines, use of test grades as teacher accountability measures, and the segregation of “mentally deficient children”. In keeping with the idea of school as a learning factory, the schools were termed the children's “place of work”. Regular attendance and good work habits were expected. The intent was to produce young adult workers who possessed a standardized skills foundation and an understanding of American cultural ethics. In 1929, it was strongly recommended that a junior high school be built to meet the needs of students who were not suited for the high school program. At that time, over 70% of the students left high school without graduating and it was felt that an intermediate, vocational program was needed to better prepare the majority for adult life.

1930–1945, the depression years

The Depression profoundly impacted education in Poughkeepsie. Although in 1930, the district went ahead with a commitment to provide “modern” instructional aids by purchasing four “moving picture” machines for $700 and spending $1,000 on a district-wide film library, by 1932, all employees were taking salary cuts to cover school costs. An enrollment decline was also noted that year: elementary enrollment increased by only 72 students in comparison with the normal annual increase of 275 children. It was during the Depression that interest in student health services first increased; speech programs were started, feet were examined, glasses bought for those who could not afford them, a dental hygiene program was begun and physical education was given prominent consideration. Students were required to show proof of smallpox vaccinations. Law mandated fire inspections and fire drills. School heating plants were changed from coal burning to oil fired heat. It was noted that “undernourished children” were observed in the schools and funds were set aside to provide limited school feeding programs. High unemployment led to the State's raising the compulsory age for school attendance to sixteen, a move that created even greater overcrowding at the high school level and the need for high school programs that better responded to a range of student interests and abilities. By 1936, the economic picture had improved somewhat. Discussion began in earnest about the need for more instructional space at the high school level. Plans were initially developed to build an addition onto the North Hamilton Street High School, but the State Education Department rejected the proposal for an addition, claiming that the site offered insufficient space. Noting that he was opposed to seeing the children of Poughkeepsie “constrained on the North Hamilton Street site for the next 50 years”, a representative from the State Education Department recommended that a new “modern” high school, similar to the recently completed Arlington High School, be built on Forbus Street, with Memorial Field as its grounds. Two bond issues to build on that site; one for a new, comprehensive high school and the other for a supplemental vocational school, which could be funded in part by a federal Public Works Assistance matching grant (similar to the ones being used to build the Post Office, the Journal building and the Violet Avenue School in Hyde Park) were defeated by the voters.

The World War II period

World War II caused tremendous changes in the schools, as the community became involved in supporting the war effort. Federally funded childcare centers for the children of working mothers were established. School buildings were used as distribution centers for rationing coupons. Surplus school equipment was donated to the federal government to aid in the war effort. In 1944–1945, the State Education Department mandated that school districts prepare “Post-War Plans” for anticipated peacetime expansion. In Poughkeepsie's plan, building an addition to the high school was again proposed. The State Education Department granted reluctant approval for the request, but continued to encourage the district to build a new facility.

1946–1959, postwar recovery

During 1945–1946, a Citizens’ Committee on New High School Facilities was constituted to study the High School question. This began a fairly consistent nine-year struggle to develop an approvable plan for construction. During this time period, the board passed many resolutions of intent to acquire property in a variety of locations for the construction of a new high school. Plans to build on the “Murphy Site” in the Town of Poughkeepsie, the “Springside Site” in the City and on Eastman Park were seriously considered. The Poughkeepsie Area Development Association and the City Planning Commission appear to have put up roadblocks to the Murphy Site and the Springside Site in the belief that undeveloped property would be better consigned to homes than schools. A proposition to build on Springside finally reached a public vote in 1953, but was defeated by a nearly 3–1 majority. Later that year, the board asked the 600-member Chamber of Commerce to study the High School question. In the fall of 1953, the Chamber endorsed construction of a new high school on the Forbus Street/Memorial Field Site arid promised to put the power of its membership behind obtaining voter approval for the plan. A proposition was passed in May 1954 for the Construction of the new building. The new high school opened in mid-September 1956 after students paraded from the old building to the new facility.

The age of Sputnik

In the mid-1950s, the State Education Department issued another mandate; the necessity of creating 7th and 8th grade centers. Since the new high school was still under construction, the board asked for a variance to delay the 1956 implementation date for the Junior High School mandate. Initially, the board planned to use the old High School as a 7/8 center, and in September 1956 established a “Betterment Fund” as a deposit site for monies to renovate the North Hamilton Street School. Between September 1956 and August 1957, the board sold the Livingston School (1901), the Cannon Street School (1875), the Lincoln School (1906), and the old S. F. B. Morse School (1860) for a total of $58,124 to apply toward renovations. In 1957, however, the board began to consider building a new 7/8 school on College Avenue, and in early 1958, sold the old high school to the Catholic Archdiocese of New York for $250,000. Later that year a bond issue to build the 7/8 center on College Avenue was defeated by a 3–1 majority of the voters. The board then decided to open two 7/8 centers; one at Morse School and the other in a wing of the new high school. Between 1958 and 1959, the administration building was constructed on the College Avenue site originally designated for the new building.

1960–1969, the turbulent 1960s

The 1960s began as a period of relative calm, with the district satisfied by the new high school, administration building and the two 7/8 centers. However, as the decade progressed, the desegregation of Black students became an issue of concern. A militant NAACP organization raised questions about segregation in the elementary schools and the 7/8 centers. Racial discrimination suits were filed against the board. Although in 1963, the Superintendent assured the State Education Department that the schools were not racially segregated, by 1964 the district acknowledged that racial imbalances existed and began to plan for district-wide redesign. The Superintendent presented an initial plan for district reorganization that included five K–4's, three 5–8's and one 9–12. The elementary ability grouping practices began in the 1920s were targeted for elimination to improve institutional integration. Teachers’ associations increased in strength during this time period and demanded negotiated grievance procedures, sick leave pay and other employee benefits. By the end of the decade, nearly all employees had bargaining units. The board, however, began to find that the constitutional limitation on school taxes severely constrained its ability to bargain. The 1960s were also the time when urban renewal planning began in earnest. Large sections of the original city core were demolished. Elsworth School was sold in 1969 for $101,500 to the Urban Renewal Agency, though the board complained bitterly about the low sale price and the Agency's strong-arm tactics. Elementary schools in areas under construction rapidly lost enrollment as neighborhoods were bulldozed. Optimistic about the city's future the Urban Renewal Agency asked the board several times to consider building new elementary schools and set aside the Lincoln Center and Riverview properties for school Construction purposes. The K–8 Spackenkill school district rejected a proposal to consolidate with Poughkeepsie in the 1960s, though they continued to send tuition students to Poughkeepsie for grades 9 – 12 until 1971. During the 1960s, two propositions to increase the constitutional tax limit were defeated by the voters, as was a proposition to increase the board to nine members.

The end of the decade: the middle school

In 1966, the board began discussing plans to build a new Middle School that would solve desegregation problems and created a Citizens’ Committee to assist in the planning. Although the board considered holding a public referendum on the Middle School in 1967, the Citizens’ Committee apparently recommended that Construction bonds be issued for a ten-year period only, thereby avoiding the need for a public vote. The State Education Department and the City Planning Commission approved plans for the Middle School. Bonds to finance construction were issued in June 1967, without voter approval.

Numerous options were also considered at that time to reduce racial isolation in the elementary schools. The board pondered a variety of Princeton-type plans; housing one grade per building, pairing 3-grade ranges at Warring and Smith, transferring students from Columbus to Krieger, placing two grades in Franklin, Smith and Warring. Building a new educational park for all students in grades K–4 was also considered. In 1969, the board adopted a plan to create five K–4 schools at Smith, Krieger, Clinton, Warring and Morse. A Krieger attendance annex was designated in the Warring district and all other attendance areas were redrawn. Columbus and Franklin were closed, though Franklin was reopened in 1971 after two low-income housing projects were built in the area and Columbus was later used to house the new, state-sponsored Pre-Kindergarten program. Transportation was authorized for students who lived more than one mile from their elementary schools. This began the bussing program from the Smith Street Projects to Krieger. The Middle School opened in the fall of 1969 as a 5–8 school. Intense controversy and public pressure resulted in returning the fifth grades to the elementary schools and putting the ninth grade back in the Middle School. Once Spackenkill built a new high school and ceased tuition students to Poughkeepsie, the high school became under populated and the 9th grade was sent back. A variety of organizational models for the Middle School academic program were tried with little success.

1970–1974

Student and teacher militancy grew, and strikes by both groups occurred during the early 1970s. During this time period, the district began to apply for and receive federal desegregation grants to offer special programs in the Middle and elementary schools. The balance of minority/non-minority students shifted dramatically during the 1970s; whereas the district had a minority population of approximately 35% at the beginning of the decade, the schools were 58% minority at its close. Although the schools were desegregated, there were continued pressures to develop educational programs that recognized and valued the rights of “culturally different” children to their cultural heritage. Unlike the 1920s, where the assimilation of different nationalities into the American way of life was considered most important, in the 1970s, cultural plurality and appreciation of ethnic differences was stressed in reaction to the Civil Rights movements of the 1960s.

1975–1988

Urban renewal continued to change city demographics during the 1970s, as the placement of numerous low-income housing projects created a large influx of minority students in the Clinton, Morse and Franklin elementary schools. Although low-income housing projects tended to keep the pupil population size somewhat stable, a definite enrollment decline was apparent by the end of the decade, with the school population dropping from over 4,800 in 1973 to 3,900 in 1980. The district responded to the declining number of students by reducing class size and spreading out programs. Specialized instructional programs previously offered in the regular classrooms were assigned their own spaces, as separate rooms were set up for art, music and remedial instruction. Major structural renovations were made at the elementary level, with new gymnasiums and cafeterias added to a number of the schools. Teachers’ unions and other employee organizations continued to grow in strength, demanding salary and benefit increases that required the district to use all available means for taxing above the constitutional limitation. Spiraling energy costs also played havoc with district resources. By the end of the 1970s, the district was again in a period of fiscal crisis, precipitated primarily by the Levittown court case, which closed a loophole in the finance law that allowed small city school districts to tax above their constitutional tax limits to cover the costs of employee benefits. A proposition to raise the constitutional tax limit was again defeated by the voters in 1979, and the district began a campaign to make the state aware of the problems of small city school district financing. To demonstrate that the district was taking all possible measures to trim costs, the two oldest elementary schools, Smith and Franklin, were closed in the spring of 1979. Attendance areas for the remaining schools were redrawn, the pre-kindergarten program was moved from Columbus to Morse and Columbus was opened as a K–5 school. During this same time, the district began plans to apply, for federal funds to create elementary magnet schools. The Morse Early Childhood program was initiated in 1980 as a K–3 school offering full-day kindergarten. The late 1970s and early 1980s saw a return to interest in raising educational standards, providing curriculum continuity, addressing instructional basics and improving test scores. Increasingly rigorous State and Federal legislation regarding services to handicapped students led to the creation of extensive and expensive special education programs. Computer programs were established in recognition of the emerging role of technology, and the Middle School Media Center, which had languished in a state of disrepair during the late 1970s, was again made operational.

1989–present, the end of the millennium

By the end of the 1980s, the district was beginning to experience an enrollment increase at the elementary level. In 1987, the district re-opened the W.W. Smith School, which it had closed in 1979 and had rented to the local Headstart Program, as a Humanities Magnet School for students in grades 3–5. The Morse Young Child Magnet School was changed from a K–3 to a K–2 school, and most Magnet School children transitioned from Morse to Smith for their elementary experience. By the middle of the 1990s, the district’ enrollment had grown by almost 1000 over the 1980 statistics, and the elementary schools were having difficulty finding space to house students. At the end of the 1990s, the board was considering building new facilities, but could not finally determine whether to build at the elementary or the high school level when there was little available land in the city. During the 1990s as well, the district saw a dramatic increase in the Hispanic population, as many immigrants from villages in Oaxaca, Mexico made their way to Poughkeepsie.

The first decade of the new century

As the 2000s began, the district was continuing to experience increasing enrollments and declining classroom space. Music on the stage, art on a cart and Title I tutoring in closets were the norm in the elementary schools. Discussions regarding the need to build new facilities to replace the aging elementary schools continued, but the lack of available land in the postage stamp-sized City of Poughkeepsie curtailed plans for a new elementary school. In 2002, voters in Poughkeepsie approved a $27 million bond issue to build additions at the Morse, Krieger and high schools and to undertake upgrades at the remaining elementary schools and the middle school. When the additions were completed, the district established sixth grades at the Krieger and Smith schools and again held third grade at Morse. This process was reversed in the fall of 2008, when all sixth grades returned to the middle school and Morse and Smith were re-configured as K–5 magnet schools.

== Schools ==
High schools

- Poughkeepsie High School (9–12)

Administrative staff:

Executive principal – Dr. Phee Simpson

Middle schools

- Poughkeepsie Middle School (6–8)

Elementary schools

- Governor George Clinton School (1–5)
- G. W. Krieger School (1–5)
- S.F.B. Morse Young Child Magnet School (1–5)
- W. W. Smith Humanities Magnet School (Early Learning Center) (Pre-k – K)
- C. B. Warring Magnet Academy of Science & Technology (1–5)

Other

- Poughkeepsie's Academic and Career Excellence or PACE (formerly known as the Circle of Courage)

Administrative staff:

Principal – Dr. Vijay Giles

Closed

- Christopher Columbus Elementary (1–5) – Closed June 2012

== Board of education ==
There are five at-large members on the board of education. Each member serves a three-year term that begins on July 1 at the annual reorganization meeting. Board meetings are usually held the second and fourth Wednesdays of every month, with the public portion of the meeting beginning at 7:30 p.m. The current members of the board of education are:

- Ralph S. Coates, President (term expires 2017)
- Raymond Duncan, Vice president (term expires 2018)
- Gregory Charter (term expires 2017)
- Randall Johnson (term expires 2019)
- Felicia Watson (term expires 2018)

== Superintendents ==
- 2000–2006: Robert C. Watson Sr.
- 2006–2013: Dr. Laval Wilson
- 2013–2017: Dr. Nicole Williams
- 2017-2018: Dr. Kathleen Farrell
- 2019–Present: Dr. Eric Jay Rosser

== Assistant/deputy superintendents ==
Current Roles

- Assistant Superintendent for Business – Ken Silver
- Assistant Superintendent for Secondary School Education – Dr. Charles Gallo
- Assistant Superintendent for Elementary School Education – Gregory Mott

Past Roles

- Assistant Superintendent for Pupil Personnel – Dr. Lynne Pampel
- Assistant Superintendent for Curriculum, Instruction, and Grants Management – Tracy Farrell

== Area colleges and universities ==
- Bard College
- Culinary Institute of America
- Dutchess Community College
- Marist College
- Mount Saint Mary College
- SUNY New Paltz
- Vassar College

== Scandals ==
Exam cheating

- In April 2013, 11 Poughkeepsie High School students were investigated for possible cheating during Regents exams. Several students showed a sharp increase of 30 points on some exams, which prompted officials to ask how such an increase happened. As a result of the investigation, Edgar Glascott, the principal at the time, as well as an assistant principal, took administrative leave. Both were eventually terminated on good standing.

Prostitution

- During June 2015, then-interim Superintendent of Finance Stanley Bronski was accused of hiring a prostitute on school district property. On the night of June 5, Bronski was supposed to meet with the woman, who, according to the police report, was hired several times prior by Bronski. Bronski did not show up at the hotel room where the woman was. When she called him, Bronski asked her to meet him at the district office building. Bronski asked the woman to come inside the building, and when she declined, Bronski refused to pay her. As a result, the woman emailed the Superintendent of Schools Dr. Nicole Williams. In the email she claimed Bronski owed her $800, and that she wanted to let the district know what he was doing. Mr. Bronski resigned on July 2, and the district agreed to expunge his record and provide him with a positive letter of recommendation for the future.
