= Edward M. Kennedy Academy for Health Careers =

Coordinates: 42°20′29.6″N 71°5′29.9″W

- 360 Huntington Avenue, Boston, Massachusetts; United States

Information
- Type: Public Secondary
- Motto: Dream. Grow. Excel.
- Established: 1998
- School district: Boston Public Schools
- Headmaster: Caren Walker Gregory
- Grades: 9-12
- Enrollment: 215
- Colors: Red and White
- Mascot: Huskies
- Website: Official site

The Edward M. Kennedy Academy for Health Careers (formerly Health Careers Academy) is one of several Horace Mann Charter Schools in the Boston Public Schools system. On April 25, 2010, the school was renamed to honor the late senator, Edward M. Kennedy.

Located in Boston, Massachusetts, United States on the campus of Northeastern University, EMK is a college prep high school with a focus on careers in the health professions. Among its partners is the Center for Community Health Education Research and Service (CCHERS), which noted a need in the community for a more diverse population of health care providers.

== Awards and honors ==
- In 2008 Ranked as one of U.S. News & World Report top schools.
- In 2006 recognized as one of the top 10 Boston Area High Schools according to the Boston Globe.
- In 2007 recognized for being one of 3 schools in the Commonwealth of Massachusetts to graduate 100% of its students of the class of 2006.
- In 2003 renewed as a Horace Mann Charter School by the Massachusetts Department of Education.

== Demographics ==
The demographic at HCA indicates that the students come from several diverse areas of Boston.

- Dorchester (40%)
- Mattapan (16%)
- Roxbury (15%)
- Hyde Park (9%)
- Roslindale (6%)
- Other (14%)

The demographics at the school also indicate a racially diverse student body.

- African-American (70%)
- Hispanic (21%)
- White (4%)
- Asian (4%)
- Native American (1%)

Approximately 61% of the student body is on a reduced school lunch program. The school's special education population is at 12%. Average daily attendance at the school is 94%.

== See also ==
- List of school districts in Massachusetts
