= Arthur L. Gould =

American educator (1879–1956)

11th Superintendent of Boston Public Schools
- In office 1937 – August 31, 1948
- Preceded by: Patrick T. Campbell
- Succeeded by: Dennis C. Haley

Personal details
- Born: Arthur Linwood Gould; December 19, 1879 Rockland, Massachusetts, U.S.
- Died: October 17, 1956 (aged 76) St. Elizabeth's Medical Center, Boston, Massachusetts, U.S.
- Parent(s): Henry Gould; Ellen (Keefe) Gold
- Education: Rockland High School; Bridgewater Normal School; Boston College (BA, MA, Lic)
- Profession: Educator

Arthur Linwood Gould (December 19, 1879 – October 17, 1956) was an American educator who served as superintendent of Boston Public Schools from 1937 to 1948.

== Early life ==
Gould was born on December 19, 1879, in Rockland, Massachusetts. He was the second youngest of nine children born to Henry and Ellen (Keefe) Gould. His father was an Irish immigrant from County Cork who worked in Rockland's shoe factories and his mother was from South Boston. Ellen Gould died in 1893. He graduated from Rockland High School in 1896 and the Bridgewater Normal School in 1900. While at Bridgewater Normal School, he was one of the founders of Kappa Delta Phi fraternity. Gould played shortstop for his high school and college baseball teams as well as for a number of semi-pro teams, including the Rockland Glee Club and the St. Alphonsus Total Abstinence Society of Rockland. He earned three degrees from Boston College (Bachelor of Arts in 1913, Master of Arts in 1914, and Licentiate in 1915).

== Career ==
After graduating from Bridgewater, Gould served as submaster of Hingham High School. In 1902, he was made principal of Abington High School. He also coached the school's baseball and football teams. He moved to the Boston Public Schools in 1906 as submaster of the Lewis School in Roxbury. He was transferred to the Martin School in 1909 and became its principal in 1911. In 1913 he was transferred to the Dearborn School in Roxbury. During the 1918–19 school year, Gould developed a plan to allow teachers to present demonstrations before a board of examiners to gain an opportunity for advancement. In 1920, he succeeded Frank Ballou as assistant superintendent. When the city opened its first junior high schools in 1920, Gould was responsible for establishing science courses. In 1937 he succeeded the deceased Patrick T. Campbell as superintendent. He retired on August 31, 1948.

== Personal life ==
Gould never married. While working in Boston, he resided at bachelor pad in the city and returned to Rockland on the weekends. Upon his retirement he resided in the Gould family home with his widowed sister. He was a Boston College Eagles football and Boston Red Sox season ticket holder. Gould died on October 17, 1956, aged 76, at St. Elizabeth's Medical Center in Brighton.

Educational offices
Preceded by Patrick T. Campbell	Superintendent of Boston Public Schools; 1937–1948	Succeeded by Dennis C. Haley
