= Odyssey High School =

High school in Boston, Massachusetts, United States

Coordinates: 42°19′57″N 71°02′42″W

Odyssey High School was a high school located at 95 G St, South Boston, Massachusetts 02127. It is a third of the old South Boston High School. The school was later shut down, after the school lost its headmaster.

It was later changed to be Boston Green Academy.
