= Tommy Chang (educator) =

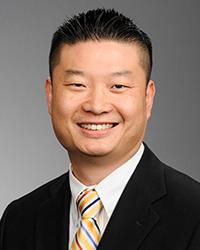

Superintendent of Boston Public Schools
- In office March 2015 – July 2018
- Preceded by: John McDonough (Interim)
- Succeeded by: Laura Perille (Interim)

Tommy Chang is an educator who served as Superintendent of Boston Public Schools in Boston, Massachusetts from 2015 to 2018.

== Career ==
Chang previously oversaw 135 schools and approximately 95,000 students as a special assistant superintendent in the Los Angeles Unified School District.

Chang replaced Carol Johnson as Superintendent of Boston Public Schools in March 2015, who had announced her retirement in April 2013. His candidacy had been favored by Boston's mayor, Marty Walsh until multiple controversies saw the mayor's support drop until his resignation in June 2018. Chang attempted to change start times for all schools in December 2017, a decision that was protested by parents and community members before it was reversed two weeks later.

== Resignation ==
Chang resigned after lawsuit was filed by student rights groups and the Lawyers' Committee for Civil Rights and Economic Justice, a law office in Boston, Massachusetts alleging improper information sharing between BPS and ICE - a claim which Chang vigorously denied in a letter to the BPS community. It was also alleged that Chang kept quiet about IRS audits into the student activity fund in 2017, which drew tension with the Boston school committee.
