= Mass Appeal (play) =

- Written by: Bill C. Davis
- Characters: Father Tim Farley; Mark Dolson
- Original language: English

Premiere
- Date premiered: May 11, 1980
- Place premiered: Stage 73; New York City

Mass Appeal is a two-character play by Bill C. Davis. The comedy-drama focuses on the conflict between a complacent Roman Catholic pastor and an idealistic young deacon who is assigned to his affluent, suburban parish.

== Plot ==
Father Tim Farley is highly popular with his parishioners due to his charm, wit, easy-going manner, and entertaining (but unchallenging) sermons. One Sunday, seminarian Mark Dolson interrupts Farley's sermon to challenge his stance on the ordination of women. The pastor is outraged yet intrigued by the young man, and asks to have him assigned to work with him.

Dolson is a firebrand eager to change the Church. He enjoys attacking Farley's "song and dance theology" and questioning why he drinks so much. Dolson feels it is his job to shake parishioners out of their complacency. Farley likes Dolson, but sees that he will never succeed as a priest if all he does is irritate people and make enemies. Each man has something to teach the other about how to perform his priestly duties.

== Productions ==
Mass Appeal was first performed in many small theatres, including The No Smoking Playhouse in Manhattan, produced by Pearl Tisman Minsky and Ken Berman, with Berman playing the role of Farley and Bill C. Davis playing the role of Dolson. At the suggestion of the pastor of "the actors' church", Minsky brought the play to Geraldine Fitzgerald, with whom she was acquainted. When Fitzgerald agreed to direct the play, she took it to Circle In The Square Theatre in Greenwich Village, who agreed to workshop it. After the workshop, Circle In The Square did not pursue the play. Fitzgerald continued to develop the script with Davis making extensive revisions. Minsky was about to bring the play to Lynn Meadows at the Manhattan Theatre Club when Fitzgerald suggested that Minsky should instead bring the play to her as she was better acquainted with it. Minsky and Berman met with other producers and put together a package for Broadway. At that point, Davis and Fitzgerald dropped Minsky and Berman, and had the play produced on Broadway. The Broadway playbill for Mass Appeal notes that the play was produced by arrangement with Minsky and Berman.

The play originally was produced by the Manhattan Theatre Club. Directed by Geraldine Fitzgerald and starring Milo O'Shea as Tim Farley and Eric Roberts as Mark Dolson, it opened at the Off-Broadway Stage 73 on April 22, 1980, and ran for 104 performances. Fitzgerald won the Outer Critics Circle Award for Outstanding New Director. Fitzgerald took her cast to Boston's Wilbur Theatre for a brief run from October 1–17, 1981. There, The Boston Phoenix called the production "a fresh, lively, and funny play."

The Broadway production, again directed by Fitzgerald and starring O'Shea as Tim Farley but with Michael O'Keefe as Mark Dolson, opened at the Booth Theatre on November 12, 1981, after 16 previews. It closed on May 16, 1982, after 212 performances.

The play premiered in the United Kingdom at the Lyric Hammersmith in London in 1982 with Gordon Jackson as Tim Farley and Rupert Everett as Mark Dolson. It received its first British revival at the Finborough Theatre in London in 2006 with Kevin Colson and Brendan Patricks.

In 1982 the play was performed at Sydney's Seymour Centre Theatre, and starred real-life father and son actors Michael and Christopher Pate.

Mass Appeal was also produced July 24 through August 7, 1982 at the Snowmass Festival of American Theater in Snowmass, CO. starring Charles Durning as Tim Farley and John Travolta as Mark Dolson. The production was directed by Paul Blake.

== Awards and nominations ==
- Tony Award for Best Performance by a Leading Actor in a Play (Milo O'Shea, nominee)
- Tony Award for Best Direction of a Play (Geraldine Fitzergald, nominee)
- Theatre World Award (Michael O'Keefe, winner)
- Drama Desk Award for Outstanding New Play (nominee)
- Drama Desk Award for Outstanding Actor in a Play (O'Shea, nominee)
- Drama Desk Award for Outstanding Director of a Play (Fitzgerald, nominee)

== Film adaptation ==
Davis adapted his play for a 1984 feature film starring Jack Lemmon as Tim Farley and Željko Ivanek as Mark Dolson.
