= Massachusetts Land Court =

Court of Massachusetts

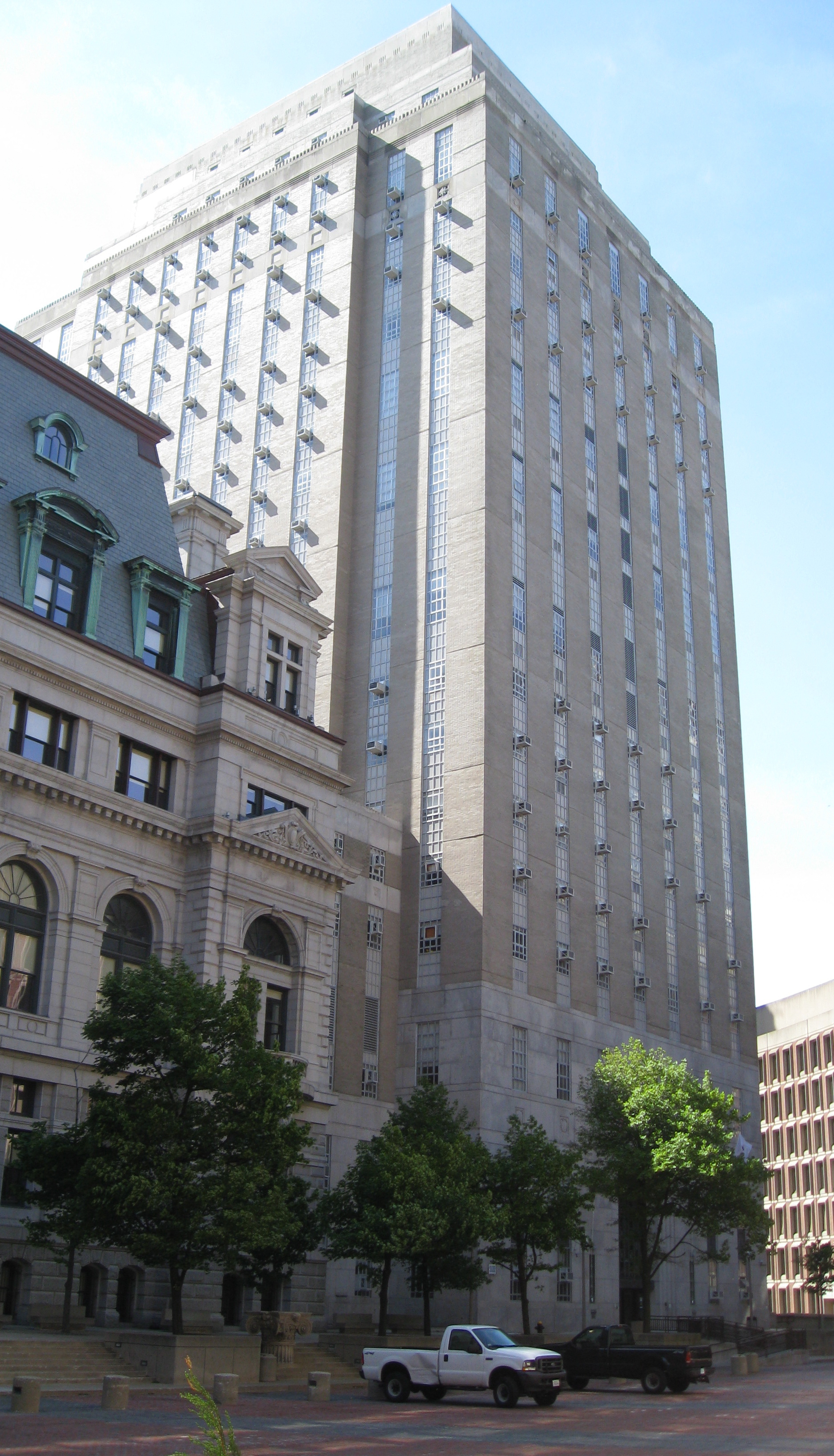
The Land Court is currently located within the Suffolk County Courthouse in Boston

The Massachusetts Land Court is one of the departments of the Trial Court of the Commonwealth of Massachusetts. The court is unique among the courts of Massachusetts and among state courts in general because its subject-matter jurisdiction is limited to disputes involving real property.

== Jurisdiction ==
The court's geographic jurisdiction covers all of Massachusetts. The court usually sits in Boston, but may hold trials at other locations when necessary.

=== Exclusive jurisdiction ===
The Land Court has exclusive and original jurisdiction over the registration of title to real property (discussed infra), over all matters and disputes concerning such title after registration, and over the foreclosure and redemption of real estate tax liens.

=== Concurrent jurisdiction ===
The Land Court shares jurisdiction over other property matters with other court departments. The court's jurisdiction overlaps significantly with that of the Massachusetts Superior Court in many instances, because the Superior Court has original jurisdiction in civil actions over $25,000, and in matters where equitable relief is sought. The court has concurrent jurisdiction with the Superior Court over specific performance of real estate contracts, over petitions for partitions of real estate, and over the processing of mortgage foreclosure cases.

The Land Court shares jurisdiction with the Superior Court and the Housing Court over matters arising out of decisions by local planning boards and zoning boards of appeal.

=== Permit Session ===
Beginning in August 2006, the Massachusetts Legislature established a separate session of the Land Court, known as the "permit session". This session has original jurisdiction over certain civil actions involving land use and environmental permitting. This jurisdiction is also concurrent with the Superior Court.

== Responsibilities of the court ==
Apart from adjudicating cases, registration of title to real property is one of the Land Court's most important responsibilities. Registration of title under Massachusetts state law occurs when the Land Court, after having the title exhaustively searched by a Court-appointed examiner, and after due process is afforded to all interested parties, reviews and then adjudicates and decrees the state of the title. Once this process is complete, the current state of the title, as it is sequentially updated by registration of future transactions, is embodied in a certificate of title which both evidences and guarantees title, subject only to the exceptions provided by statute and matters of federal law. The initial decree of registration and the subsequent certificate of title are actions in rem. Registration is useful when title is insufficient to support a conclusion of ownership under the traditional recording system, or is clearly defective, and the putative owner desires to make the title good and marketable.

The court employs a staff of engineers and surveyors to help accomplish the task of determining land title and boundaries. The Land Court also has superintendency authority over the registered land office in each registry of deeds.

== History ==
The Land Court was originally created by the Massachusetts Legislature in 1898 as the "Court of Registration". The court's name was changed to the "Court of Land Registration" in 1900, before it was finally given its current name in 1904. Over the first few years of its existence, the Court was brought into its current status as a court of record on a par with the Superior Court. Until the creation of the Massachusetts Appeals Court in 1972, it was the only court of statewide jurisdiction other than the Supreme Judicial Court. The original text of Land Court cases is provided by Westlaw, Mass Cases and LexisNexis. A law reporter with Land Court cases, commentary, and subject matter indices is provided by Landlaw Inc.

== See also ==
- List of Deed registries in Massachusetts
