= Lois Harrison-Jones =

Lois Harrison-Jones is an American school administrator and academic who has served the communities of Richmond, Virginia, Dallas, Texas, and Boston, Massachusetts. She was the first female superintendent in Richmond and the first Black female superintendent in both Virginia and Boston.

== Early life and education ==
Lois Harrison-Jones was born in Westmoreland County, Virginia. She has earned degrees from Virginia State College, Temple University, and Virginia Tech.

== Career ==
Harrison-Jones began her teaching career in 1954 as a sixth-grade teacher, working her way up through the Richmond Public School system to the position of Assistant Superintendent for Elementary Education. In 1985, she was chosen to succeed Richard Hunter as Richmond's Superintendent of Schools. At the time of her appointment, she was one of only 24 Black woman superintendents in the United States, the first Black female superintendent in Virginia, and the first female superintendent in Richmond. In 1988, she left Richmond to become the Associate Superintendent for Education of the Dallas Independent School District.

On May 14, 1991, Harrison-Jones was named superintendent of Boston Public Schools. During her tenure in Boston, student drop-out and suspension rates dropped, the Center for Leadership Development and six pilot schools were developed, and school-to-career programs were expanded. In February 1995, school committee members informed Harrison-Jones that they did not plan on extending her contract and she agreed not to contest her removal. She left office on June 30, 1995.

While in Boston, Harrison-Jones also served as a professor at Harvard University. She later taught at Howard University.
