= 1974 Massachusetts elections =

1974 Massachusetts general election
- November 5, 1974

Part of the 1974 United States elections

The 1974 Massachusetts general election was held on November 5, 1974, throughout Massachusetts. Democratic and Republican candidates were selected in party primaries held September 10, 1974.

The Democratic primary in this election was notably competitive, with formidable challenges to two incumbent Democrats (Secretary of the Commonwealth John Davoren, who lost, and Treasurer Robert Q. Crane, who narrowly won) and two open primaries (for Governor and Attorney General).

In the general election, Democrats swept the statewide offices quite easily. Republican support may have been held down by the weight of the ongoing Watergate scandal and the resignation of President Richard Nixon.

== Governor and lieutenant governor ==
Democrats Michael Dukakis and Thomas P. O'Neill III were elected Governor and Lieutenant Governor, respectively, over Republican incumbents Francis W. Sargent and Donald R. Dwight.

== Attorney general ==
1974 Massachusetts Attorney General election
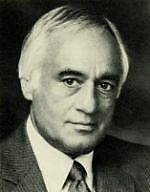

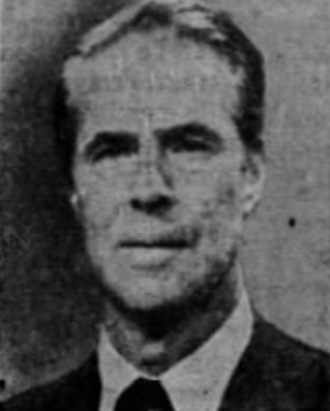
Nominee	Francis Bellotti	Josiah Spaulding
Party	Democratic	Republican
Popular vote	912,244	894,754
Percentage	49.7%	48.7%
- County results Bellotti: 50–60% 60–70% Spaulding: 50–60% 60–70%
Attorney General before election
Robert H. Quinn
Democratic
Elected Attorney General
Francis Bellotti
Democratic

Attorney General Robert H. Quinn declined to run for re-election and instead ran for Governor. In the open primary to fill his seat, former Lt. Governor Francis X. Bellotti won the Democratic nomination.

Bellotti defeated Republican nominee Josiah Spaulding in a close race.

=== Democratic primary ===
==== Candidates ====
- Francis X. Bellotti, former Lt. Governor and nominee for Governor in 1964
- Barry T. Hannon, Norfolk County Register of Deeds
- Edward Francis Harrington, attorney and former prosecutor of Raymond L.S. Patriarca
- Edward M. O'Brien
- S. Lester Ralph, mayor of Somerville and Episcopal minister
- George Sacco, State Representative from Medford

==== Results ====
1974 Democratic Attorney General primary
Party	Candidate	Votes	%
Democratic	Francis X. Bellotti	274,439	36.21%
Democratic	George Sacco	176,075	23.23%
Democratic	Edward Francis Harrington	126,771	16.71%
Democratic	S. Lester Ralph	90,489	11.94%
Democratic	Edward M. O'Brien	56,796	7.50%
Democratic	Barry T. Hannon	33,240	4.39%
Write-in		21	0.00%
Total votes		757,831	100.00%

=== Republican primary ===
==== Candidates ====
- Charles Codman Cabot Jr., chairman of the Outdoor Advertising Board
- William I. Cowin, Massachusetts Secretary of Administration and Finance
- Josiah Spaulding, former chair of the Massachusetts Republican Party and nominee for U.S. Senate in 1970

==== Results ====
1974 Massachusetts Attorney General Republican Primary
Party	Candidate	Votes	%
Republican	Josiah Spaulding	76,356	41.32%
Republican	Charles Cabot	63,127	34.16%
Republican	William I. Cowin	45,244	24.49%
Write-in		54	0.03%
Total votes		184,781	100.00%

=== General election ===
1974 Massachusetts Attorney General election
Party	Candidate	Votes	%	±%
Democratic	Francis X. Belotti	912,244	49.67%	▼12.55
Republican	Josiah Spaulding	894,754	48.71%	▲11.79
Socialist Workers	Jeanne Lafferty	29,749	1.62%	▲0.76
Write-in		20	0.00%	Steady
Total votes		1,836,767	100.00%	

== Secretary of the Commonwealth ==
1974 Massachusetts Secretary of the Commonwealth election
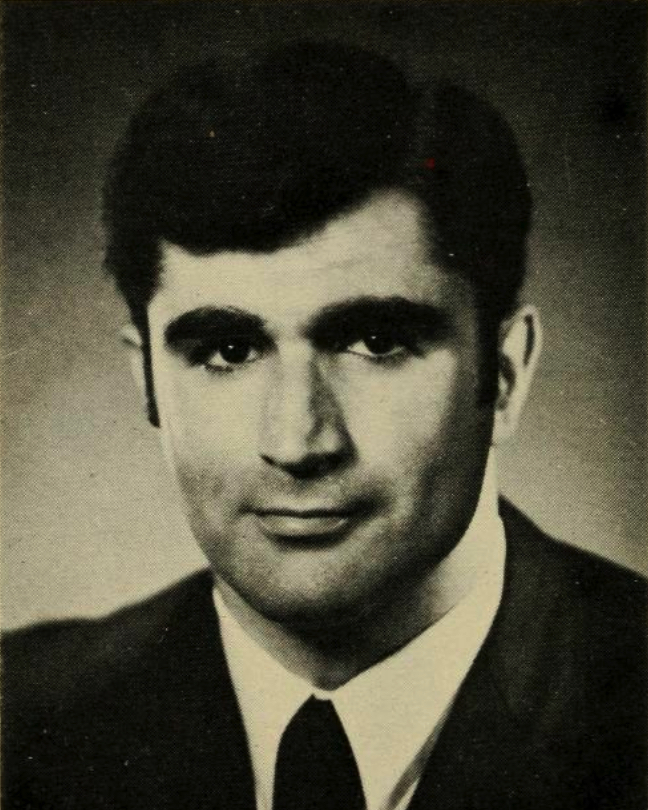

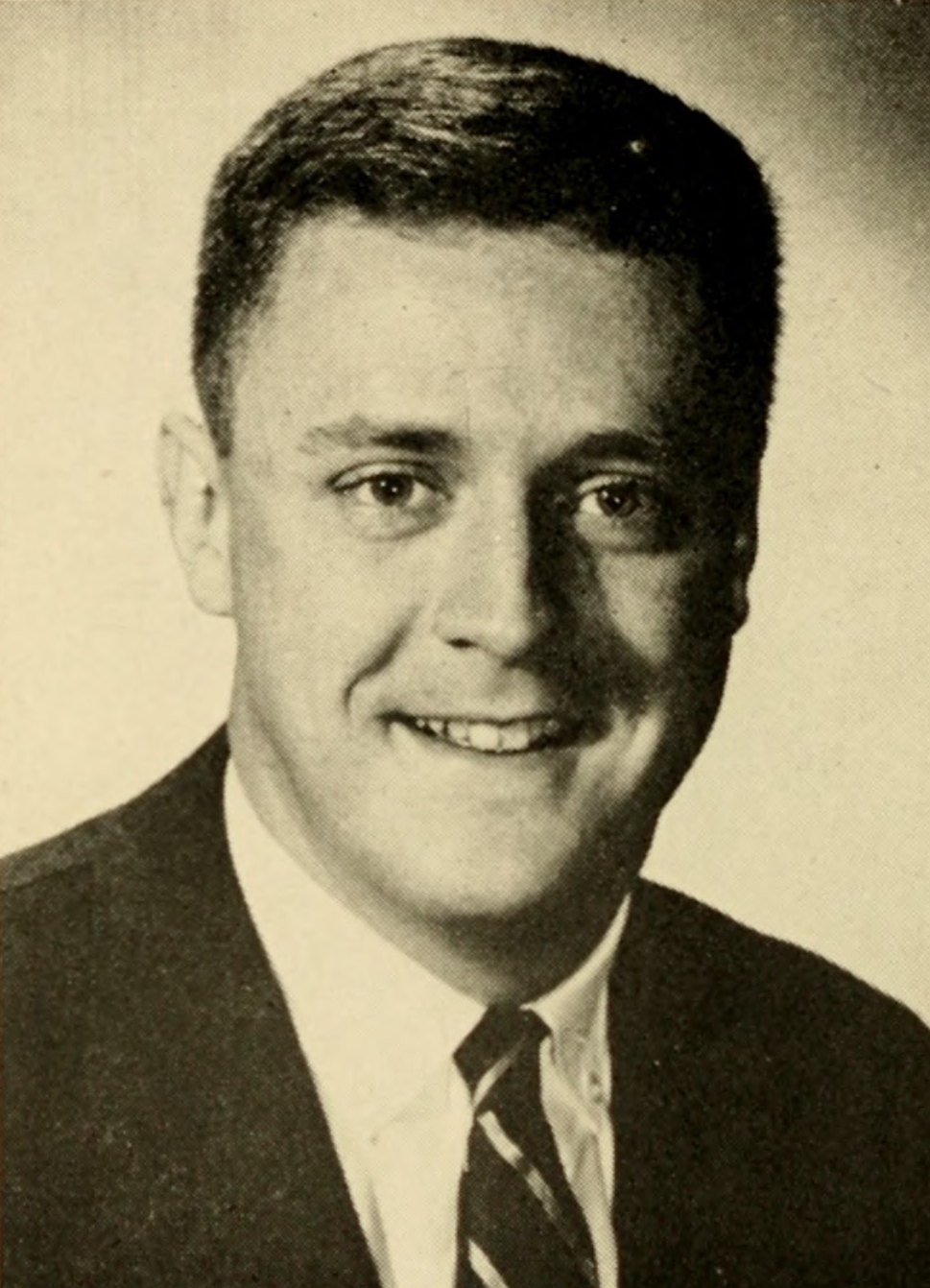
Nominee	Paul Guzzi	John M. Quinlan
Party	Democratic	Republican
Popular vote	1,155,636	636,203
Percentage	64.5%	35.5%
Secretary of the Commonwealth before election
John Davoren
Democratic
Elected Secretary of the Commonwealth
Paul Guzzi
Democratic

Secretary of the Commonwealth John Davoren was defeated in the Democratic primary by Paul Guzzi. Guzzi went on to defeat Republican State Senator John M. Quinlan in the general election.

=== Democratic primary ===
==== Candidates ====
- John Davoren, incumbent Secretary of the Commonwealth
- Paul Guzzi, State Representative from Newton

==== Results ====
1974 Massachusetts Secretary of the Commonwealth Democratic Primary
Party	Candidate	Votes	%
Democratic	Paul Guzzi	398,684	56.81%
Democratic	John Davoren (incumbent)	303,097	43.19%
Write-in		13	0.00%
Total votes		701,794	100.00%

=== Republican primary ===
==== Candidates ====
===== Declared =====
- John M. Quinlan, State Senator

===== Withdrew at convention =====
- Ron Burton, former Boston Patriots running back

==== Results ====
Following Burton's withdrawal, Quinlan was unopposed for the Republican nomination.

=== General election ===
Massachusetts Secretary of the Commonwealth Election, 1974
Party	Candidate	Votes	%	±%
Democratic	Paul Guzzi	1,155,636	64.49%	▲10.65
Republican	John M. Quinlan	636,203	35.51%	▼9.17
Write-in	All others	48	0.00%	Steady
Total votes		1,791,887	100.00%	

== Treasurer and Receiver-General ==
1974 Massachusetts Treasurer Democratic primary
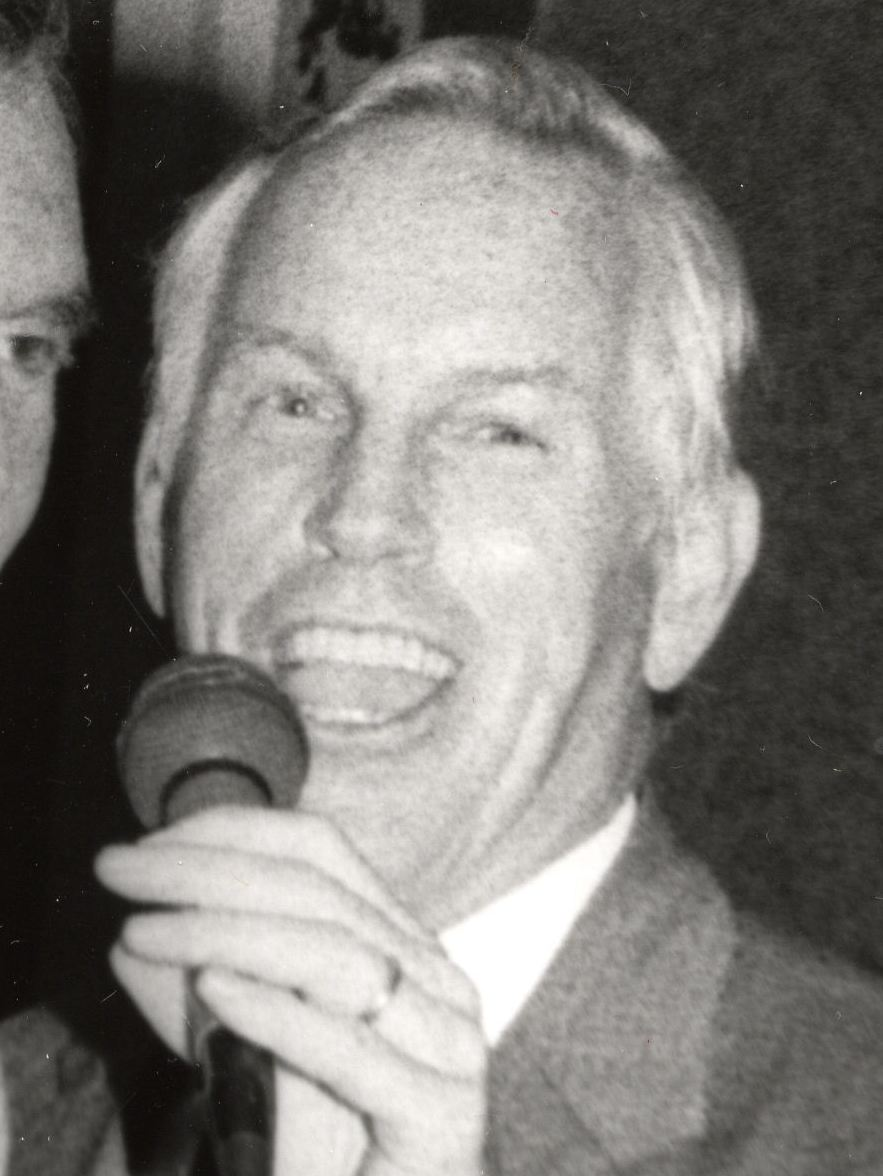

Nominee	Robert Q. Crane	Charles Mark Furcolo
Party	Democratic	Democratic
Popular vote	355,216	340,882
Percentage	51.0%	49.0%
- Crane: 50–60% 60–70% 70–80% 80–90% >90% Furcolo: 50–60% 60–70% 70–80%
Treasurer and Receiver-General before election
Robert Q. Crane
Democratic
Elected Treasurer and Receiver-General
Robert Q. Crane
Republican

Incumbent Treasurer and Receiver-General Robert Q. Crane defeated Charles Mark Furcolo in the Democratic Primary.

Erna Ballantine ran an unsuccessful sticker campaign for the Republican nomination.

=== Democratic primary ===
==== Candidates ====
- Robert Q. Crane, incumbent Treasurer and Receiver-General
- Charles Mark Furcolo, Boston attorney and son of Foster Furcolo

==== Results ====
1974 Massachusetts Treasurer and Receiver-General Democratic Primary
Party	Candidate	Votes	%
Democratic	Robert Q. Crane (incumbent)	355,216	51.03%
Democratic	Charles Mark Furcolo	340,882	48.97%
Write-in		27	0.00%
Total votes		696,125	100.00%

=== General election ===
Massachusetts Treasurer and Receiver-General Election, 1974
Party	Candidate	Votes	%	±%
Democratic	Robert Q. Crane (incumbent)	1,387,119	99.97%	▲34.36
Write-in		382	0.03%	▲0.03
Total votes		1,387,501	100.00%	

== Auditor ==
Incumbent Auditor Thaddeus M. Buczko was unopposed in the Democratic primary and the general election.

=== General election ===
Massachusetts Auditor General Election, 1974
Party	Candidate	Votes	%	±%
Democratic	Thaddeus M. Buczko (incumbent)	1,369,431	99.99%	▲33.12
Write-in		196	0.01%	▲0.01
Total votes		1,369,627	100.00%	

== United States House of Representatives ==
All of Massachusetts' twelve seats in the United States House of Representatives were up for election in 1974.

Ten seats were won by candidates seeking re-election.

The 3rd District seat was won by Joseph D. Early, who succeeded retiring Democrat Harold Donohue. The 5th District seat was won by Democrat Paul Tsongas, who defeated incumbent Republican Paul W. Cronin.
