= 1978 Massachusetts elections =

1978 Massachusetts general election
- November 7, 1978

Part of the 1978 United States elections

A Massachusetts general election was held on November 7, 1978 in the Commonwealth of Massachusetts.

The election included:

- statewide elections for United States Senator, Governor, Lieutenant Governor, Attorney General, Secretary of the Commonwealth, Treasurer, and Auditor;
- district elections for U.S. Representatives, State Representatives, State Senators, and Governor's Councillors; and
- ballot questions at the state and local levels.

Democratic and Republican candidates were selected in party primaries held September 14, 1978.

== Governor and lieutenant governor ==
Democrats Edward J. King and Thomas P. O'Neill III were elected Governor and Lieutenant Governor, respectively, over Republican candidates Francis W. Hatch, Jr. and William I. Cowin.

== Attorney general ==
1978 Massachusetts Attorney General election
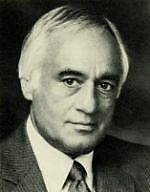

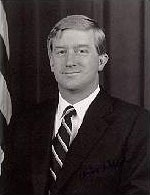
Nominee	Francis Bellotti	Bill Weld
Party	Democratic	Republican
Popular vote	1,532,835	421,417
Percentage	78.4%	21.6%
- County results Bellotti: 60–70% 70–80% 80–90%
Attorney General before election
Francis Bellotti
Democratic
Elected Attorney General
Francis Bellotti
Democratic

Democrat Francis X. Belotti was elected Attorney General. He defeated Republican Bill Weld in the general election.

Massachusetts Attorney General Election, 1978
Party	Candidate	Votes	%	±%
Democratic	Francis X. Belotti (incumbent)	1,532,835	78.43%	▲28.76
Republican	Bill Weld	421,417	21.56%	▼27.15
Write-in		64	0.01%	▲0.01
Total votes		1,954,316	100.00%	

== Secretary of the Commonwealth ==
1978 Massachusetts Secretary of the Commonwealth election
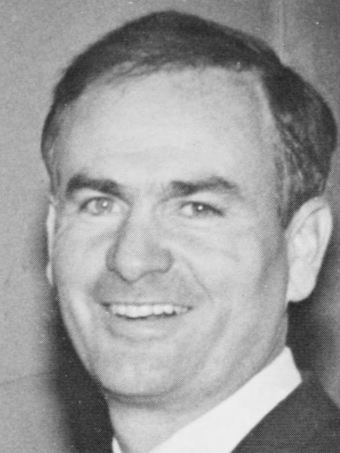

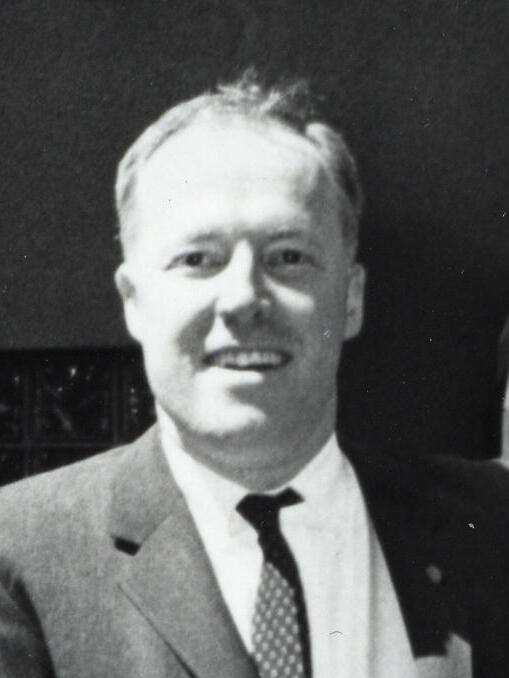
Nominee	Michael J. Connolly	John W. Sears
Party	Democratic	Republican
Popular vote	1,115,409	744,488
Percentage	60.0%	40.0%
Secretary of the Commonwealth before election
Paul Guzzi
Democratic
Elected Secretary of the Commonwealth
Michael J. Connolly
Democratic

Incumbent Secretary of the Commonwealth Paul Guzzi sought election to the U.S. Senate, leaving his office vacant for the next term.

State Representative Michael J. Connolly defeated Lois Pines, Anthony J. Vigliotti, James Hennigan, David E. Crosby, William J. Galvin Jr., and John Fulham in the Democratic primary and Republican John W. Sears in the general election.

=== Candidates ===
- Michael J. Connolly, State Representative from Roslindale
- David E. Crosby
- John Fulham
- William J. Galvin Jr., son of former Boston City Council President William J. Galvin
- James W. Hennigan Jr., former State Senator from Jamaica Plain and member of the Boston School Committee
- Lois Pines, State Representative from Newton
- Anthony J. Vigliotti, Worcester County Registrar of Deeds

Massachusetts Secretary of the Commonwealth Democratic Primary, 1978
Party	Candidate	Votes	%
Democratic	Michael J. Connolly	192,641	25.81%
Democratic	Lois Pines	185,504	24.85%
Democratic	Anthony J. Vigliotti	103,895	13.91%
Democratic	James Hennigan	80,402	10.77%
Democratic	David E. Crosby	78,372	10.50%
Democratic	William J. Galvin Jr.	67,180	9.00%
Democratic	John Fulham	38,337	5.13%
Write-in		12	0.00%
Total votes		746,383	100.00%
Blank	{{{candidate}}}	156,876	—
Turnout		903,259	100.00%

=== General election ===
Massachusetts Secretary of the Commonwealth Election, 1978
Party	Candidate	Votes	%	±%
Democratic	Michael J. Connolly	1,115,409	59.96%	▼4.53
Republican	John W. Sears	744,488	40.02%	▲4.53
Write-in		169	0.02%	▲0.02

== Treasurer and Receiver-General ==
1978 Massachusetts Treasurer election
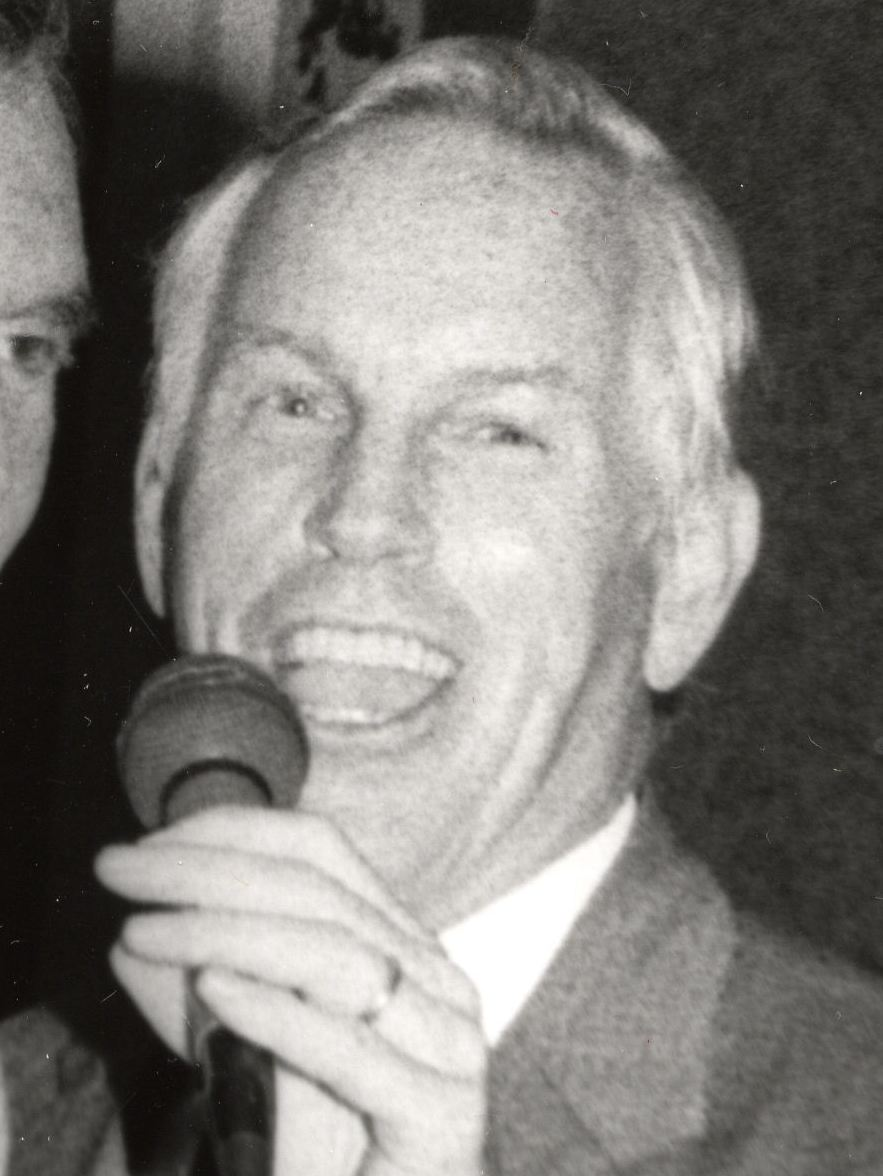

Nominee	Robert Q. Crane	Lewis Crampton
Party	Democratic	Republican
Popular vote	1,125,960	743,231
Percentage	60.2%	39.76%
Treasurer and Receiver-General before election
Robert Q. Crane
Democratic
Elected Treasurer and Receiver-General
Robert Q. Crane
Republican

Incumbent Treasurer and Receiver-General Robert Q. Crane defeated Lawrence DiCara, Paul Cacchiotti, Dayce Moore, Thomas Lopes, and Lawrence Blacke in the Democratic Primary and Republican Lewis Crampton in the general election.

=== Democratic primary ===
==== Candidates ====
- Lawrence Blacke
- Paul Cacchiotti
- Robert Q. Crane, incumbent Treasurer and Receiver-General since 1964
- Lawrence DiCara, President of the Boston City Council
- Thomas Lopes, State Representative from New Bedford
- Dayce Moore

==== Results ====
Massachusetts Treasurer and Receiver-General Democratic Primary, 1978
Party	Candidate	Votes	%
Democratic	Robert Q. Crane (incumbent)	375,688	49.04%
Democratic	Lawrence DiCara	231,315	30.19%
Democratic	Paul Cacchiotti	45,029	5.88%
Democratic	Dayce Moore	43,466	5.67%
Democratic	Thomas Lopes	39,691	5.18%
Democratic	Lawrence Blacke	30,930	4.04%
Write-in		24	0.00%
Total votes		766,143	100.00%

Massachusetts Treasurer and Receiver-General Election, 1978
Party	Candidate	Votes	%	±%
Democratic	Robert Q. Crane (incumbent)	1,125,960	60.24%	▼39.72
Republican	Lewis Crampton	743,231	39.76%	N/A
Write-in		67	0.00%	▼0.03
Total votes		1,869,258	100.00%	

== Auditor ==
1978 Massachusetts Auditor election
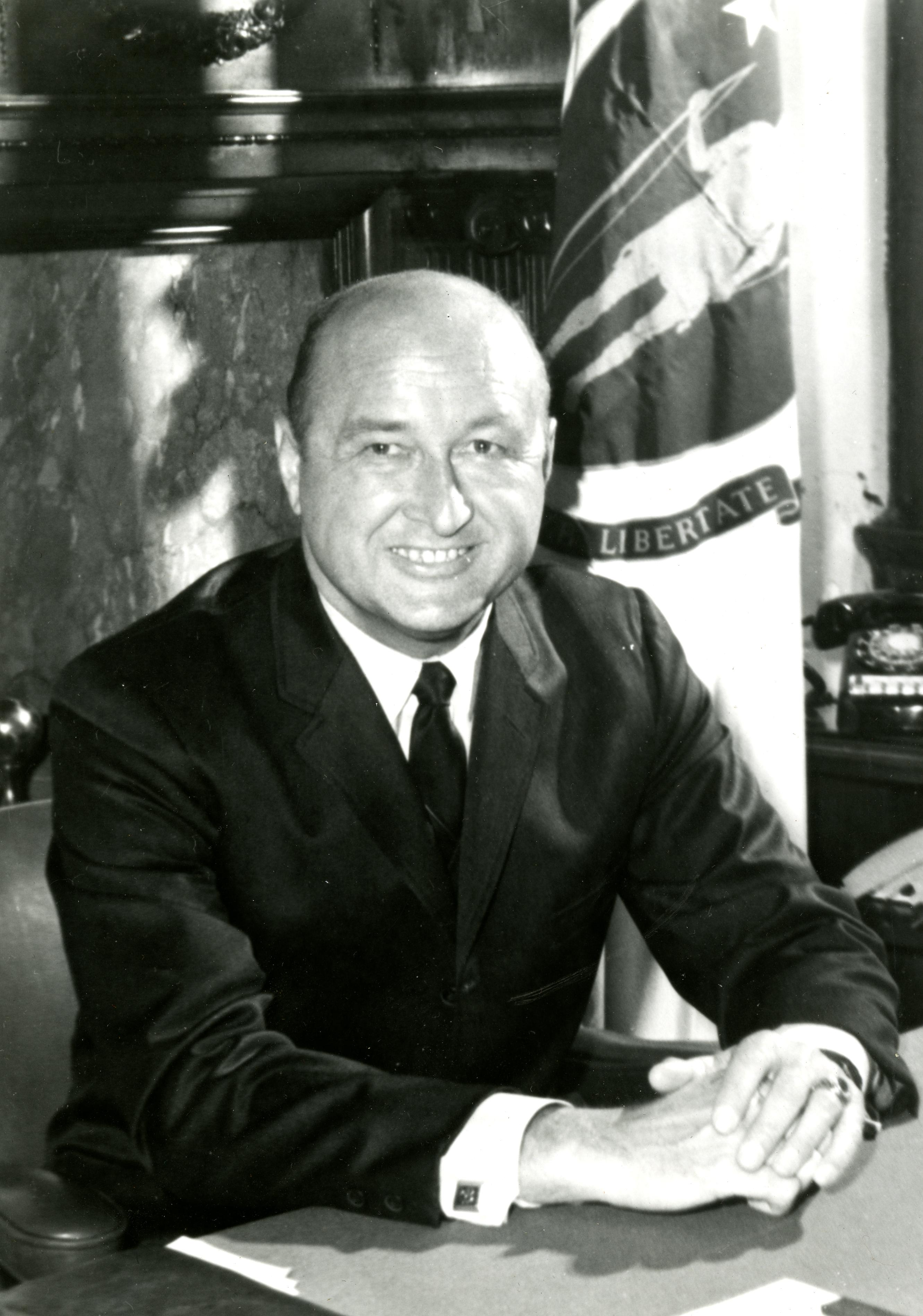

Nominee	Thaddeus Buczko	Timothy O'Brien
Party	Democratic	Republican
Popular vote	1,189,562	643,096
Percentage	64.9%	35.1%
Auditor before election
Thaddeus M. Buczko
Democratic
Elected Auditor
Thaddeus M. Buczko
Democratic

Incumbent Auditor Thaddeus M. Buczko defeated Peter Meade in the Democratic primary and Republican Timothy F. O'Brien in the general election.

O'Brien replaced William A. Casey as the Republican nominee after Casey dropped out of the race. After conservative Edward J. King defeated Michael Dukakis for the Democratic nomination for governor, Casey chose to drop-out and support the anti-abortion King over the pro-choice Republican nominee Francis Hatch.

O'Brien was selected by the State Committee over attorney Ralph Barbagallo, Jr. and William Sargent, the son of former Governor Francis W. Sargent.

=== Democratic primary ===
==== Candidates ====
- Thaddeus M. Buczko, incumbent Auditor
- Peter Meade, former Boston Parks Commissioner

==== Results ====

Massachusetts Auditor Democratic Primary, 1978
Party	Candidate	Votes	%
Democratic	Thaddeus M. Buczko (incumbent)	448,294	59.57%
Democratic	Peter Meade	304,218	40.43%
Write-in		10	0.00%
Total votes		752,522	100.00%

=== General election ===
Massachusetts Auditor General Election, 1978
Party	Candidate	Votes	%	±%
Democratic	Thaddeus M. Buczko (incumbent)	1,189,562	64.91%	▼35.08
Republican	Timothy F. O'Brien	643,096	35.09%	N/A
Write-in		48	0.00%	▼0.01
Total votes		1,832,658	100.00%	

== United States Senator ==
Democratic Democratic Congressman Paul E. Tsongas was elected over incumbent Republican Edward Brooke.
