= William Galvin =

William Galvin, Bill Galvin or Billy Galvin may refer to:

- William F. Galvin (born 1950), Massachusetts Secretary of the Commonwealth
- William C. Galvin (born 1956), Massachusetts state representative
- William J. Galvin (1904–1988), Boston city councilor
- Bill Galvin (Australian politician) (1903–1966), Victorian state politician
- Billy Galvin, a 1986 film
