= 1992 West Virginia Democratic presidential primary =

- May 10, 1992
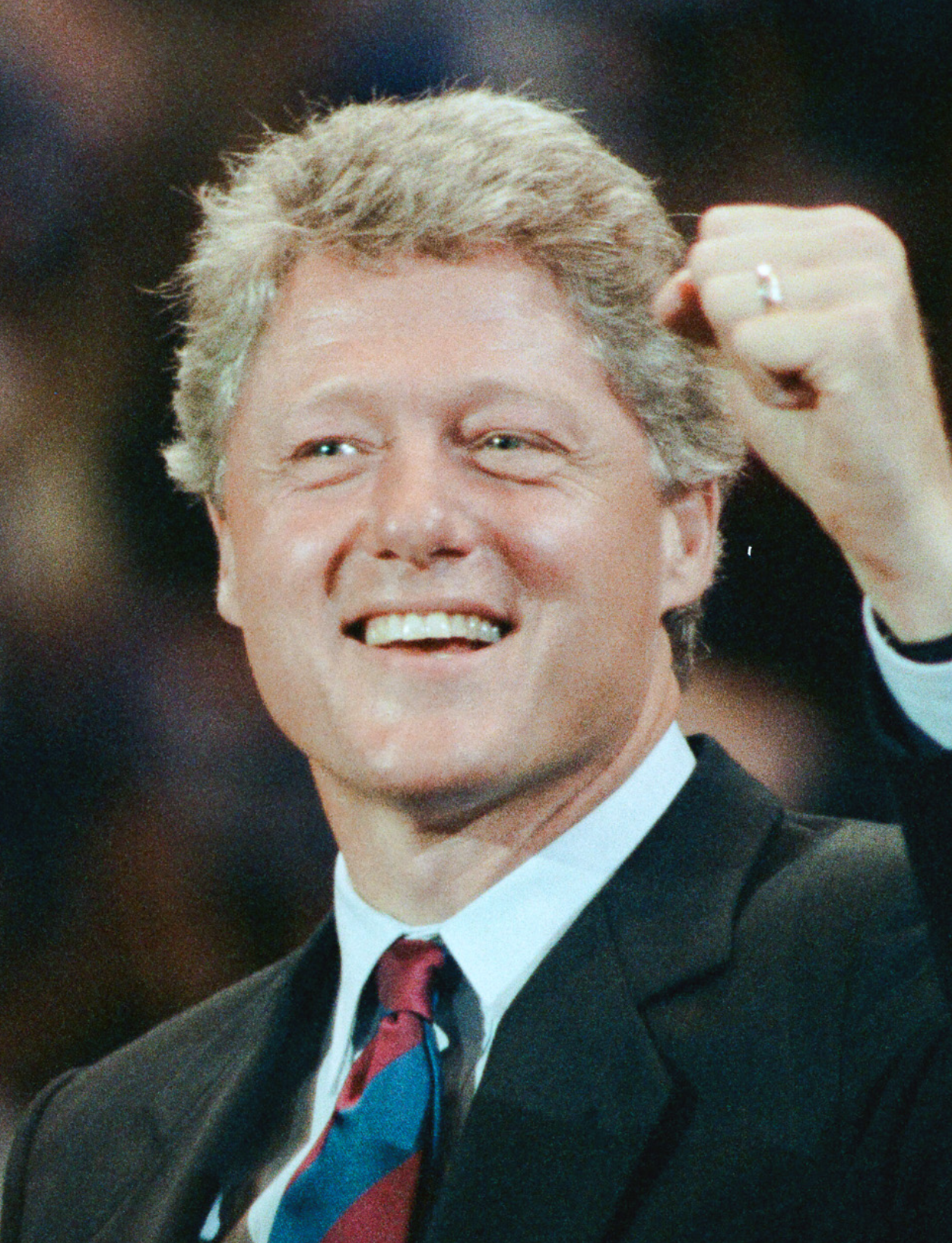

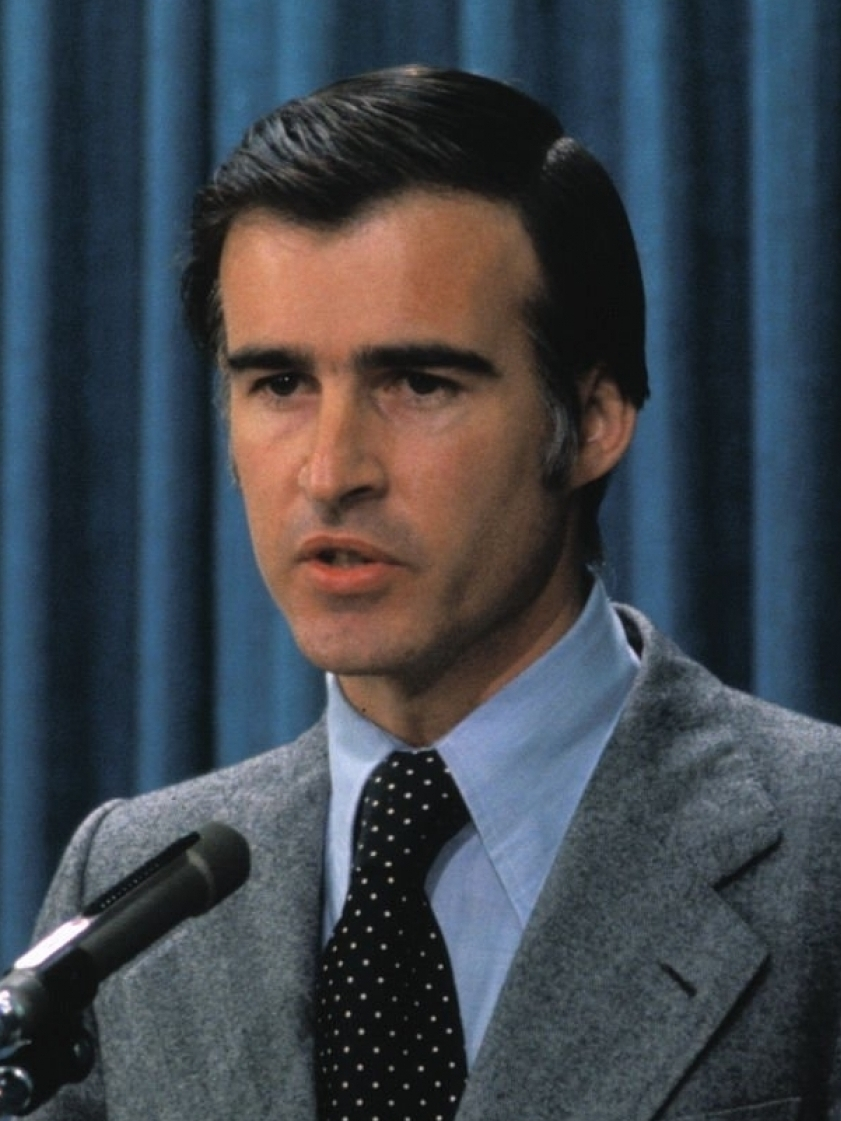

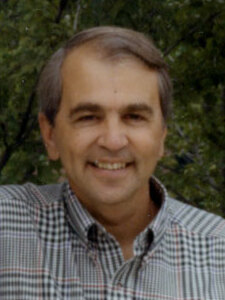
Candidate	Bill Clinton	Jerry Brown	Paul Tsongas (withdrawn)
Home state	Arkansas	California	Massachusetts
Popular vote	227,815	36,505	21,271
Percentage	74.24%	11.99%	6.93%
County results
Clinton
70–80%
70–80%
80–90%

The 1992 West Virginia Democratic presidential primary was held on May 10, 1992, in the state of West Virginia as one of the Democratic Party's statewide nomination contests ahead of the 1992 presidential election. Bill Clinton comfortably won the contest by a 62-point margin.

== Results ==
1992 West Virginia Democratic primary
Candidate	Votes	%
Bill Clinton	227,815	74.24
Jerry Brown (withdrawn)	36,505	11.99
Paul Tsongas	21,271	6.93
Angus Wheeler McDonald	9,632	3.14
Bob Kerrey (withdrawn)	3,152	1.03
Lyndon LaRouche	3,141	1.02
Tom Harkin (withdrawn)	2,774	0.90
Charles Woods	1,487	0.49
Ralph Spelbring	1,089	0.36
Total	306,866	100%
