= 1978 United States Senate election in Massachusetts =

- November 7, 1978
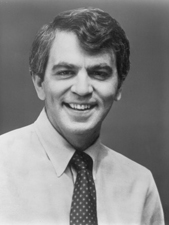

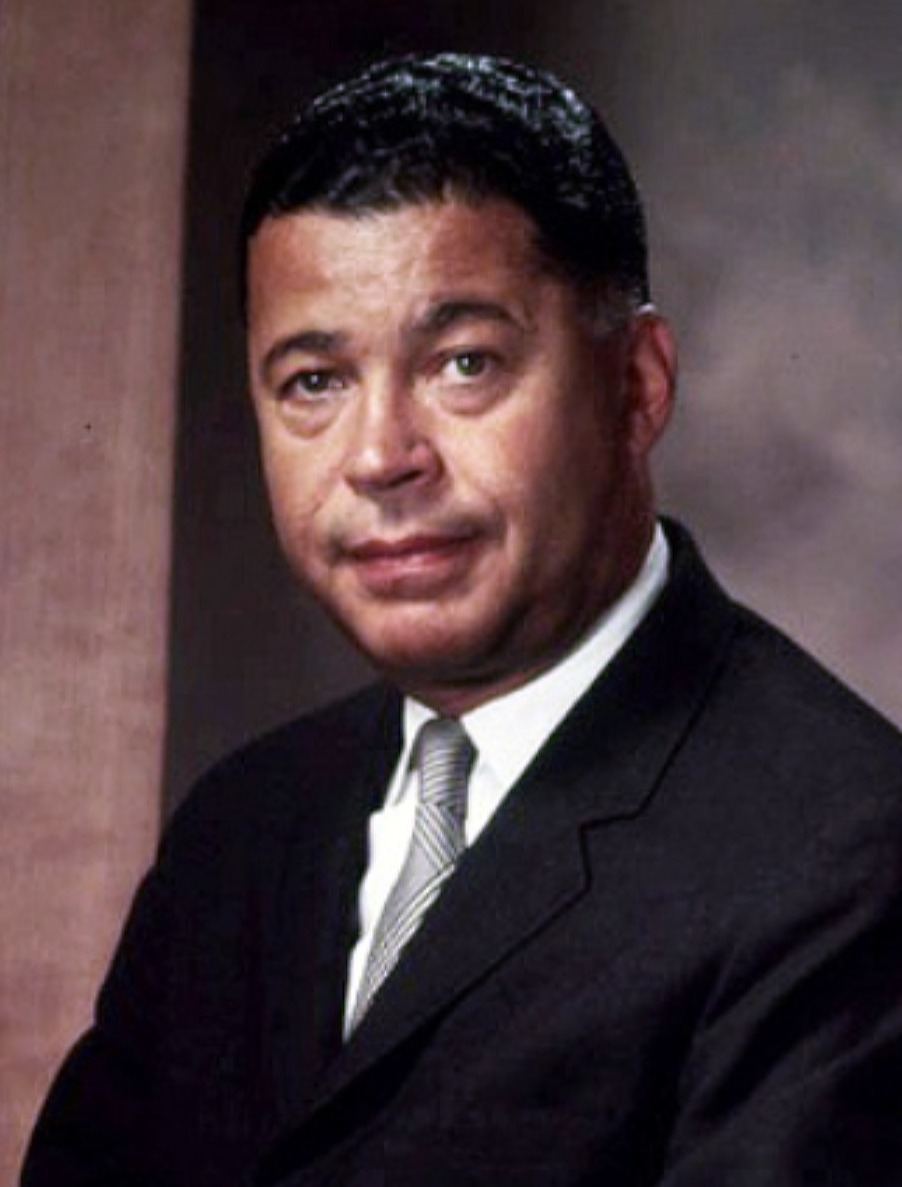
Nominee	Paul Tsongas	Edward Brooke
Party	Democratic	Republican
Popular vote	1,093,283	890,584
Percentage	55.06%	44.85%
- Tsongas: 40–50% 50–60% 60–70% 70–80% Brooke: 40–50% 50–60% 60–70% 70–80%
U.S. senator before election
Edward Brooke
Republican
Elected U.S. Senator
Paul Tsongas
Democratic

The United States Senate election of 1978 in Massachusetts was held on November 7, 1978. Republican incumbent Senator Edward Brooke ran for a third term in office, but was defeated by Democratic U.S. Representative Paul Tsongas.

Primary elections were held on September 19. Brooke survived a fierce challenge from conservative television and talk radio host Avi Nelson, while Tsongas won with a plurality over a field led by Paul Guzzi.

Throughout the primary and general election, Brooke was dogged by questions surrounding his 1976 divorce and an ongoing Senate ethics investigation. He also faced criticism from both Nelson and Tsongas for his support for desegregation busing.

Tsongas's swearing-in marked the first time since 1937 that the Democratic Party held both United States Senate seats from Massachusetts.

== Background ==
In 1966, Edward Brooke of the Republican Party was the first African American elected to the United States Senate by direct election. He was re-elected by a landslide margin in 1972, despite Richard Nixon failing to carry the state at the top of his ticket. As a result, Brooke was considered a highly popular incumbent and a strong favorite for election to a third term in 1978; he was even occasionally mentioned as a potential candidate for vice president or president of the United States.

However, Brooke's support for controversial desegregation busing programs during his third term in office marginalized him, both within the increasingly conservative Republican Party and Massachusetts, where busing was extremely controversial, as a whole. He was also the first Republican (by several weeks) to call for the resignation of Richard Nixon during the Watergate scandal and led opposition to Nixon's Supreme Court appointments of G. Harrold Carswell and Clement Haynsworth, partly over their records on the civil rights movement.

Brooke also filed for divorce from his estranged wife, Remigia Ferrari, in 1976, initiating a highly contentious, years-long legal battle after Remigia contested the divorce in court and countersued for "cruel and abusive treatment." In May 1978, as the primary election season intensified, Brooke made false statements regarding his finances, mischaracterizing a $49,000 transaction as a formal loan from a friend. Although the divorce was scheduled to become final on June 15, Brooke's false statements were leaked to the media on May 26, sparking public controversy and an internal probe by the Senate Committee on Ethics. Brooke quickly admitted in a public press conference that he lied to maximize his liabilities during the divorce proceedings. Throughout the summer and early autumn, The Boston Globe continued to report on Brooke's divorce and personal finances, including evidence that his mother-in-law had improperly received $50,000 in Medicaid benefits, and his own daughter publicly accused him of lying in a radio interview. Although the divorce was finalized by October 1978 through an expedited transfer of property and no criminal wrongdoing was ever alleged, the legal battle and ethics investigation severely damaged Brooke's public image and reputation, which had been built on his opposition to corruption and self-interest.

== Republican primary ==
=== Candidates ===
- Edward Brooke, incumbent U.S. senator since 1967
- Avi Nelson, television and talk radio host and candidate for U.S. House in 1972

=== Campaign ===
Senator Brooke, who had been unopposed for re-nomination in 1972, was challenged by radio host Avi Nelson.

Brooke was considered liberal, and Nelson attacked him for being out of step with the increasingly conservative Republican Party base. The race drew comparison to the Republican primary in New Jersey, which was held in June, where young conservative activist Jeff Bell defeated incumbent liberal Clifford Case. Both races were considered signs that the Republican Party had moved in a more conservative direction.

During the campaign, Brooke faced questions about his ongoing divorce, but Nelson declined to comment on the issue directly. Nelson instead focused his attacks on Brooke's support of the Panama Canal Treaty and federal funding for abortion, and his decision to decline to sponsor the proposed Roth–Kemp tax cut. In response, Brooke emphasized his support for cuts to the capital gains tax and his opposition to reductions in defense spending.

Observers expected that if Nelson won, he would be unlikely to win the general election in such a liberal state. In an effort to stave off an upset, Republican National Committee chair Bill Brock recorded radio advertisements supporting Brooke, and some of Brooke's conservative Republican colleagues issued a letter of support.

=== Results ===
On September 19, Brooke defeated Nelson by a margin of 17,963 votes. Brooke was strongest in Boston and the North Shore, while Nelson received strong support in Plymouth and Bristol counties.

Massachusetts United States Senate Republican primary results by municipality, 1978

Republican primary
Party	Candidate	Votes	%
Republican	Edward Brooke (incumbent)	146,351	53.25%
Republican	Avi Nelson	128,388	46.72%
Write-in		78	0.03%
Total votes		274,807	0.03%

== Democratic primary ==
=== Candidates ===
- Kathleen Sullivan Alioto, member of the Boston School Committee and daughter of New England Patriots owner Billy Sullivan
- Paul Guzzi, secretary of the commonwealth
- Elaine Noble, state representative from the Back Bay, Boston
- Howard Phillips, former Nixon administration official
- Paul Tsongas, U.S. representative from Lowell

==== Withdrew ====
- Michael J. Connolly, state representative from Roslindale (ran for secretary of the commonwealth)

==== Declined ====
- Thomas P. O'Neill III, lieutenant governor of Massachusetts (ran for reelection as lieutenant governor)

=== Campaign ===
In the early stages of the Democratic primary campaign, Brooke seemed like a strong incumbent, discouraging potential Democratic candidates from running.

The first to declare her candidacy was Elaine Noble, a two-term state representative serving the Back Bay and Fenway-Kenmore neighborhoods of Boston. Noble was primarily known for her status as the highest-ranking openly gay elected official in United States history to this point and was described in the Washington Post as "an avowed lesbian." Although Noble had the endorsements of U.S. House speaker Tip O'Neill and his son, lieutenant governor Tom O'Neill III, the latter began telling state officials he intended to enter the race, creating an awkward situation for both candidates. O'Neill ultimately decided not to run.

As Brooke began to appear more vulnerable during the primary season, more experienced Democrats declared their campaigns. By the time Brooke's divorce proceedings concluded, Noble was joined by Secretary of the Commonwealth Paul Guzzi, Lowell Congressman Paul Tsongas, and Kathleen Sullivan Alioto, who had supported desegregation busing on the Boston School Committee. Soon, conservative Howard Phillips entered the race, hoping to exploit a four-way split in the liberal vote. Guzzi was considered the early favorite, due to his statewide office and name recognition. However, Tsongas demonstrated a familiarity with national issues and aired clever ads playing on his hard-to-pronounce Greek last name. By the closing days of the campaign, some considered Tsongas a slight favorite.

=== Results ===
On Election Day, Tsongas won by a margin of 37,955 votes out of over 835,000 cast. Tsongas was able to win without a strong showing in Boston and its surrounding suburbs, which was the typical path to victory in the Democratic primary. Instead, he won through strong support from his base of constituents in and around Lowell. While Guzzi was strong throughout the state, he was overwhelmed by Tsongas's support in Lowell and the Merrimack Valley region. Alioto was strongest on the South Coast.

Massachusetts United States Senate Democratic primary results by municipality, 1978

Democratic primary
Party	Candidate	Votes	%
Democratic	Paul Tsongas	296,915	35.55%
Democratic	Paul Guzzi	258,960	31.01%
Democratic	Kathleen Sullivan Alioto	161,036	19.28%
Democratic	Howard Phillips	65,397	7.83%
Democratic	Elaine Noble	52,464	6.28%
Write-in		379	0.05%
Total votes		835,151	100.00%

== General election ==
=== Candidates ===
- Edward Brooke, incumbent U.S. senator since 1967 (Republican)
- Paul Tsongas, U.S. representative from Lowell (Democratic)

=== Campaign ===
Early in the campaign season, Brooke was considered a favorite for re-election. Tsongas was relatively unknown, whereas Brooke remained a national icon as the first popularly-elected African American senator and a member of Republican Party leadership.

Both candidates were considered liberals by contemporary definitions, with Brooke known as a public supporter of the women's liberation movement, and both candidates received high ratings from the group Americans for Democratic Action, which at times had rated Brooke as even more liberal than his Democratic colleague Ted Kennedy. As senator, Tsongas was viewed by many as fiscally conservative but socially liberal. He once quipped, “If anyone thinks the words 'government' and 'efficiency' belong in the same sentence, we have counselling available.” Although the public generally considered Tsongas the more liberal of the two, Brooke received the support of many liberal Democrats and civil rights leaders, including Jesse Jackson, Coretta Scott King, and Barney Frank.

Race was another major issue, demonstrated by the reaction to desegregation busing policies in the commonwealth. Brooke was a major opponent of legislation to restrict the practice and had successfully defeated the Biden Amendment, which would end federal funding for busing programs. Brooke's position likely cost him votes in Boston and other working-class, white communities, which had rioted in preceding years over the issue. South Boston politician and prominent busing opponent Louise Day Hicks decried Brooke as an "apostle of urban neglect." For his part, Tsongas claimed that voting for Brooke on the basis of his race was "the other side of racism."

While not directly addressing Brooke's ongoing divorce and ethics investigation, Tsongas attacked Brooke as out of touch with Massachusetts voters and too "Washington-oriented," which observers viewed as an allusion to both.

=== Endorsements ===
Edward Brooke

Federal executive branch officials

- Henry Kissinger, former U.S. secretary of state and national security advisor

U.S. senators

- Barry Goldwater, United States senator from Arizona and Republican nominee for president in 1964

State legislators

- Barney Frank, state representative from Brookline (Democratic)
- Saundra Graham, state representative from Cambridge (Democratic)

Individuals

- Jesse Jackson, civil rights leader
- Coretta Scott King, civil rights leader and widow of Martin Luther King Jr.
- Gloria Steinem, journalist, feminist, and activist
Paul Tsongas

Federal executive branch officials

- Cecil Andrus, U.S. secretary of the interior
- Jimmy Carter, 39th president of the United States

U.S. senators

- Ted Kennedy, senior United States senator from Massachusetts

U.S. representatives

- Michael J. Harrington, U.S. representative from Beverly

Individuals

- John Updike, novelist

=== Results ===
1978 U.S. Senate election in Massachusetts
Party	Candidate	Votes	%	±%
Democratic	Paul Tsongas	1,093,283	55.06%	▲20.33
Republican	Edward Brooke (incumbent)	890,584	44.85%	▼18.68
Write-in		1,833	0.09%	N/A
Total votes		1,985,700	100.00%	N/A
Democratic gain from Republican				

== See also ==
- 1978 United States Senate elections

== External links and references ==
- 1978 Congressional Election results
