= Harold Sines Vance =

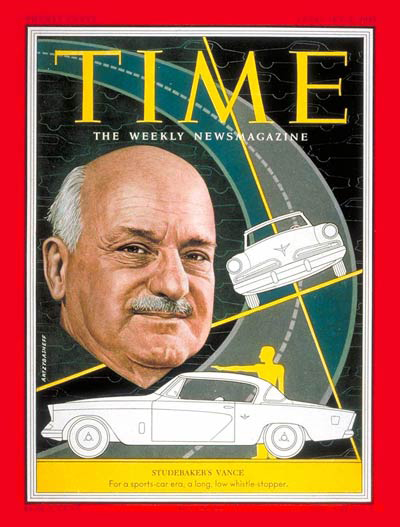
- Vance on the cover of Time (February 2, 1953)
- Born: 22 August 1889; Port Huron, Michigan
- Died: 31 August 1959 (aged 70); Washington D.C.
- Occupations: Automobile company executive, United States Atomic Energy Commission member
- Employer(s): Studebaker, United States Atomic Energy Commission
- Height: 6 ft 0 in (183 cm)
- Board member of: Studebaker Corporation executive, Washington DC committee on mobilization relating to the Korean War, United States Atomic Energy Commission
- Spouse: Agnes Margaret Monaghan
- Children: 2
- Parents: Samuel W. Vance (1852-1900) (father); Carrie E. Sines (1858-1936) (mother)

Harold Sines Vance (22 August 1889 – 31 August 1959) was an American automobile company executive and government official, notable for being chairman (1935–1954) and president (1948–1954) of the Studebaker Corporation and for a four-year term on the Atomic Energy Commission, where he encouraged the industrial use of nuclear energy.

== Biography ==
Vance was born in the city of Port Huron, Michigan, in 1889. He achieved moderate grades in school and, having failed the entrance examination for West Point, he went to work briefly for his father's law partner whose death terminated the arrangement. In 1910, he obtained a job as a mechanic at the Port Huron branch of the E-M-F Company, which was being acquired by the Studebaker Corporation. He moved to the Detroit plant and was production vice-president in 1926 when he supervised the plant's closure and move to Studebaker's primary plant at South Bend, Indiana. By the time of the Great Depression, Vance was production vice president in the company at South Bend, working with Paul G. Hoffman who would later take charge of the Marshall Plan and the Ford Foundation.

A series of financial mistakes by Studebaker's long-serving president Albert Russel Erskine, led to his suicide and the corporation's insolvency in 1933. Vance and Paul G. Hoffman gained control of the company as receivers with Ashton G. Bean of the White Motor Company and began to reinstate the operation which owed the banks $6 million but had current assets of $7 million, being an operating concern with a big stock of cars on hand. In 1935, a $6,800,000 new stock and bond issue, underwritten by Lehman Brothers, Goldman Sachs and others, took Studebaker out of receivership. At that time, Vance became chairman and Hoffman became president.

A new era of success arrived with the popular 1939 Studebaker Champion car range. A sales record of over $364 million was set in 1943 Contracts during the Second World War brought in $1.2 billion, and led to the production of 290,000 trucks, 64,000 engines for Flying Fortresses, and 16,000 amphibious vehicles (the Studebaker US6 truck and the unique M29 Weasel cargo and personnel carrier, in particular). With Hoffman's departure to head the Economic Cooperation Administration (administrator of the Marshall Plan) in 1948, Vance became both chairman and president of Studebaker. On February 2, 1953, Vance was featured on the front cover of Time magazine.

In 1952, Vance was called to Washington, D.C., to chair a committee on mobilization relating to the Korean War. To Defense Secretary Robert Lovett, Vance reportedly commented "Bob, I understand that the Army has 60,000 trucks in Texas just sitting around." This disclosure led to the cancellation of a $100 million order for such trucks which had been placed with Studebaker. The reports attracted the attention of President Dwight D. Eisenhower, who requested that Vance direct the mobilization process, however Vance declined.

In 1954, Studebaker was merged with Packard Motors Company and Vance left the corporation. A year later, in on October 31, 1955, Vance joined the United States Atomic Energy Commission, and worked there until his death on August 31, 1959.
