= George Sacco =

American politician (1936–2025)

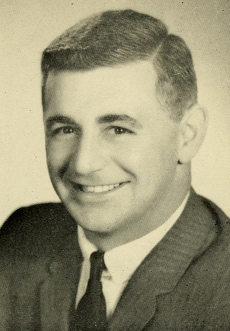

Member of the Massachusetts House of Representatives
- In office 1963–1974

Personal details
- Born: July 19, 1936 Medford, Massachusetts, U.S.
- Died: November 2, 2025 (aged 89) Lowell, Massachusetts, U.S.
- Party: Democratic
- Education: Medford High School; Worcester Academy; Northeastern University; Suffolk University; Suffolk University Law School

George Lawrence Sacco Jr. (July 19, 1936 – November 2, 2025) was an American lawyer and politician, who served as a member of the Massachusetts House of Representatives and was a candidate for Massachusetts Attorney General.

== Early life ==
Sacco was born in Medford, Massachusetts on July 19, 1936. He attended Medford High School, Worcester Academy, Northeastern University, Suffolk University, and Suffolk University Law School. In 1967, he married Elaine Golden, sister of state legislator J. Laurence Golden.

== Political career ==
From 1959 to 1962, Sacco was a member of the Medford school committee. From 1963 to 1974, he was a member of the Massachusetts House of Representatives. In 1974, he was the youngest Vice-Chair of House Ways and Means in the House of Representatives. Sacco is credited with funding and supporting legislation that created UMass Medical School, Executive Office of Elder Affairs, Mass Commission on Women, beginning the lottery, reforming adoption laws. He was a candidate for Massachusetts Attorney General. He finished second in the six-candidate Democratic primary with 23% of the vote.

== Death ==
Sacco died in Lowell on November 2, 2025, at the age of 89.

== Personal life ==
George and Elaine Sacco adopted two daughters, Lauren and Allison. He had two grandchildren—George Henry and Rita Elaine, at the time of his death.
