= Paul W. Cronin =

American politician (1938–1997)

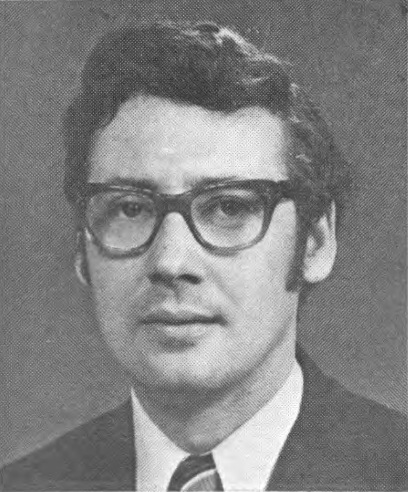

Member of the U.S. House of Representatives from Massachusetts's 5th district
- In office January 3, 1973 – January 3, 1975
- Preceded by: F. Bradford Morse
- Succeeded by: Paul Tsongas

Member of the Massachusetts House of Representatives from the 13th Essex district
- In office January 1, 1969 – January 6, 1971
- Preceded by: John Cornelius Bresnahan
- Succeeded by: James P. Hurrell

Member of the Massachusetts House of Representatives from the 12th Essex district
- In office October 18, 1967 – January 1, 1969
- Preceded by: Arthur Williams
- Succeeded by: Robert C. Buell

Personal details
- Born: March 14, 1938 Boston, Massachusetts, U.S.
- Died: April 5, 1997 (aged 59) Boston, Massachusetts, U.S.
- Party: Republican
- Education: Boston University (BA); Harvard University (MPA)

Paul William Cronin (March 14, 1938 – April 5, 1997) was a one-term congressman of the U.S. House of Representatives from Massachusetts.

Cronin was born in Boston, Massachusetts, on March 14, 1938, and graduated from Boston University in 1962 and the John F. Kennedy School of Government in 1969. He was elected as an Andover, Massachusetts selectman at the age of 24, was later elected as a member of the Massachusetts House of Representatives from 1967 to 1970. He was elected in a special election for the 12th Essex district when incumbent Arthur Williams resigned. He was reelected to the 13th Essex district in 1968. In 1970, he was defeated for another term in the State House by James P. Hurrell. Before his election to Congress, he also served as a member of Rep. F. Bradford Morse's Congressional Staff, and as a delegate to Republican National Conventions in both 1968 and 1972.

In 1972, he was elected as a Republican to the Ninety-third Congress, defeating future US Senator and Presidential candidate John Kerry, who had moved to the Fifth District to seek the seat after Rep. Morse resigned to take a post at the United Nations. Cronin's victory was a huge upset against the anti-war candidate Kerry. He had trailed at one point by more than 20%, and his victory was often accredited to harsh attacks by The Lowell Sun, which attacked Kerry for being an elitist carpetbagger and for his questioning of the patriotism of those who supported the war.

In the House, Cronin served on the Interior Committee, and began a process that led ultimately to the creation, years later, of an urban park in Lowell. A businessman and non-ideologue at heart, Cronin placed himself in the moderate wing of his party.

In 1974, his first bid for re-election, Cronin faced an assertive challenge from a Lowell-based county commissioner Paul Tsongas, who seized on President Nixon's impeachment troubles in what turned out to be a bad year, electorally, for Republicans nationwide. Tsongas demanded that Cronin release his income tax returns, but the congressman declined; Cronin also declined to debate Tsongas. Tsongas also made political hay over the failure of a technology firm, Mostek, to locate a facility in Lowell after Cronin had promised the firm would do so. A memorable Tsongas radio ad featured echoing footsteps in an empty building. In the November election, Tsongas won 61% of the vote—and went on to become a US Senator and a candidate for President of the United States in 1992.

Cronin later in life would serve a number of positions at Massachusetts Port Authority, and he unsuccessfully sought the GOP nomination for governor against William Weld. In 1992, Cronin won the Republican nomination to regain his old seat against a weak incumbent Chester G. Atkins. However, Atkins, who had been caught up in the House check-kiting scandal, would be defeated in the primary by an up-and-coming Democratic star, Martin T. Meehan, who in turn would defeat Cronin in the General Election 52% to 38%. Cronin died on April 5, 1997, from a brain tumor at Massachusetts General Hospital in Boston, Massachusetts, and was buried in Spring Grove Cemetery in Andover.

Massachusetts House of Representatives
Preceded by Arthur Williams	Member of the Massachusetts House of Representatives from the 12th Essex district 1967–1969	Succeeded by Robert C. Buell
Preceded by John Cornelius Bresnahan	Member of the Massachusetts House of Representatives from the 13th Essex district 1969–1971	Succeeded by James P. Hurrell
U.S. House of Representatives
Preceded by F. Bradford Morse	Member of the U.S. House of Representatives from Massachusetts's 5th congressional district 1973–1975	Succeeded by Paul Tsongas
