= John M. Quinlan =

American politician

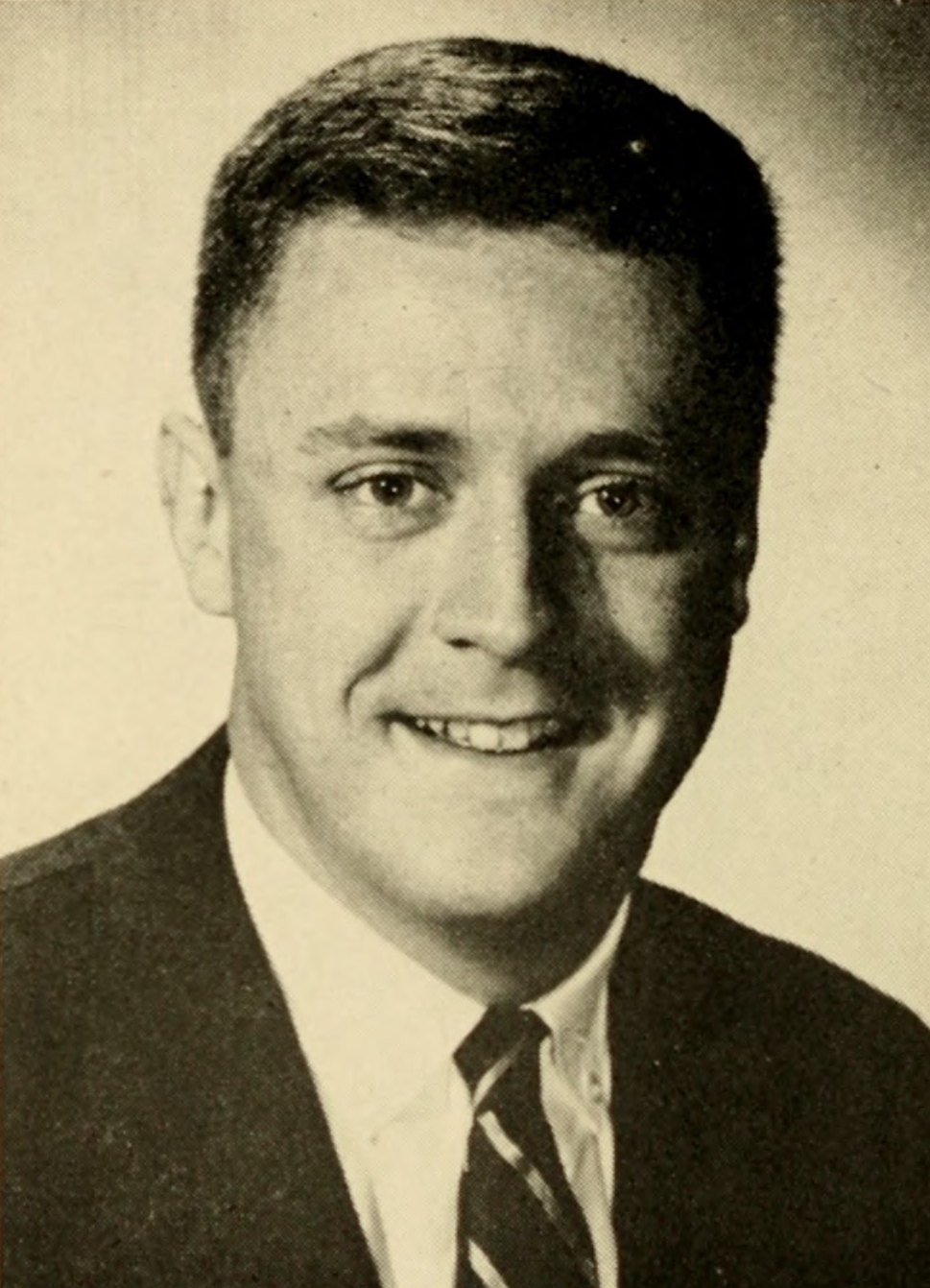

Member of the Massachusetts Senate from the Norfolk, Bristol and Plymouth district
- In office 1965–1975
- Preceded by: George A. Sullivan, Jr.
- Succeeded by: Robert E. McCarthy

Personal details
- Born: July 11, 1935 (age 91) Natick, Massachusetts
- Party: Republican
- Education: Harvard College
- Occupation: Teacher; Politician

John Michael "Jack" Quinlan was an American politician who served as a member of the Massachusetts Senate from 1965 to 1975.

== Early life ==
Quinlan was born on July 11, 1935, in Natick, Massachusetts. He attended public school in Dover, Massachusetts, and Sacred Heart School. He graduated from Harvard College in 1957 and taught at Franklin High School for four years.

== Political career ==
=== State senate ===
Quinlan began his political career as an assistant to U.S. Senator Leverett Saltonstall. In 1964 he was elected to the Massachusetts Senate. During his tenure in the Senate, Quinlan filed a number of pieces of unsuccessful legislation related to campaign finance reform.

In 1968, Quinlan served as the state chairman for United Citizens for Nixon-Agnew.

Quinlan also led a number of petition drives, including one that led to the joint election of the Governor and Lieutenant Governor and 4-year terms for statewide officers.

=== Campaigns for higher office ===
In 1970, Quinlan ran for the Republican nomination for Lieutenant Governor. His candidacy was not supported by Governor Francis W. Sargent, who instead endorsed Martin Linsky, followed by Donald R. Dwight, who entered the race after Linsky dropped out. Dwight won the convention nomination and Quinlan dropped out and endorsed the Sargent-Dwight ticket.

In 1972, Quinlan ran for the United States House of Representatives seat in the Massachusetts's 9th congressional district held by Louise Day Hicks. He was favored to win the primary, but dropped out of the race, with his disenchantment with the state Republican party and the unattractive situation of having Richard Nixon on the top of the GOP ticket given as reasons for Quinlan not seeing the campaign as worthwhile.

In 1974, Quinlan was the Republican nominee for Secretary of the Commonwealth of Massachusetts. He lost to Democrat Paul Guzzi 64% to 36%.

=== Post-legislative career ===
After leaving the state senate, Quinlan served as an aide to United States Secretary of Health and Human Services Margaret Heckler, was campaign director for Jim Rappaport's campaign for the United States Senate in 1990, and was a spokesperson for the Central Artery/Tunnel Project (better known as the Big Dig) from 1991 to 2007.

Party political offices
Preceded by Mary B. Newman	Republican nominee for Secretary of the Commonwealth of Massachusetts; 1974	Succeeded by John W. Sears
