= Paul G. Hoffman =

American economist

Paul Hoffman
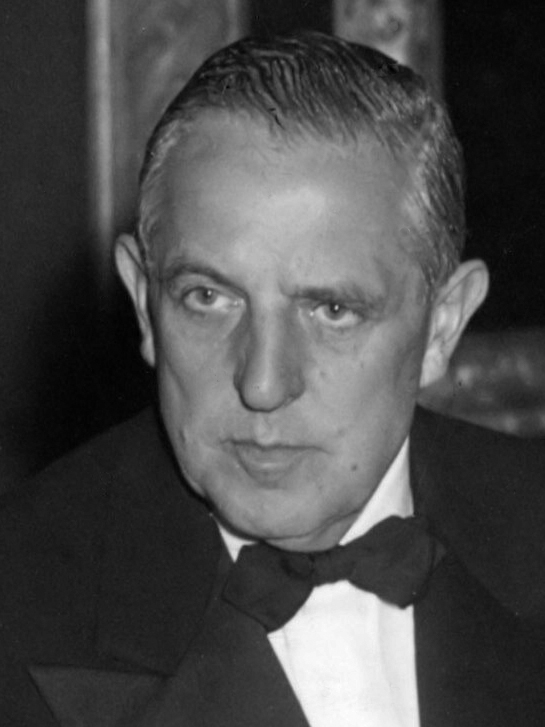
- Hoffman in 1950

Administrator of the United Nations Development Programme
- In office January 1, 1966 – January 15, 1972
- Secretary General: U Thant; Kurt Waldheim
- Preceded by: Position established
- Succeeded by: Rudolph A. Peterson

Administrator of the Economic Cooperation Administration
- In office April 9, 1948 – September 30, 1950
- President: Harry S. Truman
- Preceded by: Position established
- Succeeded by: William Foster

Personal details
- Born: Paul Gray Hoffman; April 26, 1891 Western Springs, Illinois, U.S.
- Died: October 8, 1974 (aged 83) New York City, New York, U.S.
- Party: Republican
- Spouses: Dorothy Brown (m. 1915; died 1961); Anna Rosenberg (m. 1962)
- Children: 7
- Education: University of Chicago (attended)

Paul Gray Hoffman (April 26, 1891 – October 8, 1974) was an American automobile company executive, statesman, and global development aid administrator. He was the first administrator of the Economic Cooperation Administration, where he led the implementation of the Marshall Plan from 1948 to 1950.

== Life and work ==
Hoffman was born in Western Springs, Illinois, a suburb of Chicago. He quit his studies at the University of Chicago at 18 to sell Studebaker cars in Los Angeles. He had made his first million dollars by the age of 34 and became president of Studebaker ten years later. Hoffman and Harold Sines Vance were the two executives most responsible for rescuing Studebaker from insolvency in the 1930s.

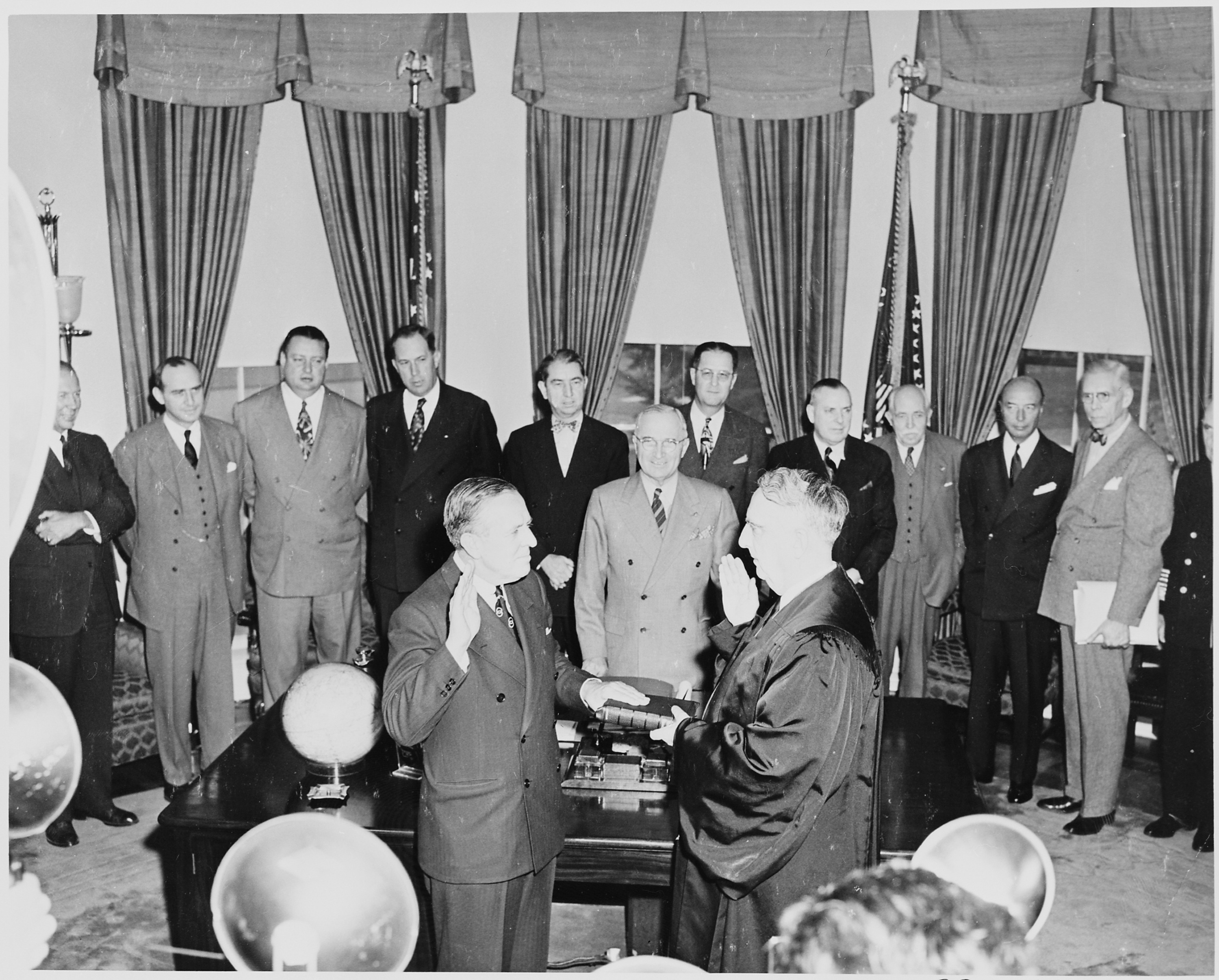
Hoffman being sworn in as administrator of the Economic Recovery Corporation (1948)

From 1935 to 1948, Hoffman served as president of Studebaker. From 1950 to 1953, he also served as the president of the Ford Foundation.

In May 1951 he was appointed to the executive committee of the California branch of the Committee on the Present Danger.

Returning to Studebaker in 1953, Hoffman was chairman of the corporation during the turbulent period leading up to and during the 1954 merger with the Packard Motor Car Company. When Studebaker-Packard found itself nearing insolvency in 1956, the company entered into an Eisenhower Administration-brokered management agreement with Curtiss-Wright. Hoffman, Vance (who had become chairman of the executive committee after the Packard merger) and S-P president James J. Nance all left the company.

From 1966 to 1972, he was the first administrator of the United Nations Development Programme when it was founded, with David Owen as his co-administrator.

On June 21, 1974, he was awarded the Presidential Medal of Freedom by President Richard Nixon.

== The Marshall Plan ==
President Harry S. Truman nominated Hoffman to lead the Economic Cooperation Administration (ECA) in April 1948. Truman initially wanted to nominate Dean Acheson, but Hoffman was a more acceptable candidate to Congress, which preferred someone with more business acumen. In this role as administrator, he was responsible for managing the distribution of U.S. aid to post-WWII Europe. He primarily worked with the Organization of European Economic Cooperation (OEEC) and coordinated policy with the U.S. State Department.

He was a forceful advocate of European integration. In September 1949, Hoffman and his staff met in Washington to assess the progress of the Marshall Plan. They agreed that the "salvage function is substantially completed" and that the ECA should now focus on integrating the economies of Europe by supporting European-led initiatives to reduce trade barriers, coordinate fiscal policy, streamline regulation, and ensure currency convertibility and stability. This would, in their view, strengthen the European economies so that by they could be "free from dependence on sustained outside assistance."

His most famous speech as ECA administrator was his October 31, 1949, address to the OEEC in which he argued that Europe must integrate. Invoking a comparison to the United States, he argued:

The substance of such integration would be the formation of a single large market within which quantitative restriction on the movements of goods, monetary barriers to the flow of payments and, eventually, all tariffs are permanently swept away. The fact that we have in the United States a single market of 156 million consumers has been indispensable to the strength and efficiency of our economy. The creation of a permanent, free trading area, comprising 270 million consumers in Western Europe would have a multitude of helpful consequences. It would accelerate the development of large-scale, low-cost production industries. It would make the effective use of all resources easier, and the stifling of healthy competition more difficult... This is why integration is not just an ideal. It is a practical necessity.

He concluded this speech with a veiled threat that the U.S. Congress may not continue to fund the Marshall Plan if the Europeans did not integrate. Congressional leadership was, indeed, sceptical of continuing to fund the Marshall Plan absent integration.

Hoffman's tenure as administrator of ECA was marked by dramatic improvements in the industrial and agricultural output of countries receiving Marshall Plan aid.

== Personal life ==
Hoffman's first wife was Dorothy Brown. They married in 1915. She died in May 1961. She was a Christian Scientist. The couple had five sons, Hallock, Peter, Donald, Robert and Lathrop, and two adopted daughters, Barbara and Kiriki. Hoffman married businesswoman Anna M. Rosenberg on July 19, 1962.

== Publications ==
Film clips

- A film clip "Longines Chronoscope with Paul G. Hoffman" is available for viewing at the Internet Archive
- A film clip "Longines Chronoscope with Paul G. Hoffman (July 30, 1951)" is available for viewing at the Internet Archive

Diplomatic posts
New office	Administrator of the Economic Cooperation Administration; 1948–1950	Succeeded by William Foster
New office	Administrator of the United Nations Development Programme; 1966–1972	Succeeded by Rudolph A. Peterson
