= Rudolph A. Peterson =

Rudolph Peterson

Administrator of the United Nations Development Programme
- In office 1972–1976
- Secretary General: Kurt Waldheim
- Preceded by: Paul G. Hoffman
- Succeeded by: F. Bradford Morse

Personal details
- Born: December 6, 1904 Svenljunga, Sweden
- Died: December 2, 2003 (aged 98) Piedmont, California, U.S.
- Party: Republican
- Education: University of California, Berkeley (BS)

Rudolph Arvid Peterson (December 6, 1904 – December 2, 2003) was an American banker who served as the president and CEO of Bank of America and administrator of the United Nations Development Programme.

== Background ==
Peterson was born into a family of six children in Svenljunga, Västra Götaland, Sweden. He was adopted by his maternal uncle and aunt who emigrated in September 1905. At first they lived in Youngstown, Ohio, United States. In 1907 they joined a trainload of young Swedish families set out for California. They settled down in Los Angeles. In 1913 the family moved to Hilmar in Merced County, California, a Swedish immigrant farming colony outside Turlock, California. He graduated from the Hilmar High School and the University of California, Berkeley, (B.S. 1925).

== Career ==
During his career, he worked at Commercial Credit Corporation, the Transamerica Corporation and the Bank of Hawaii. He joined Bank of America in 1936 and spent two decades in California before leaving for six years with the Bank of Hawaii. He was president of the Bank of Hawaii when he returned to Bank of America in 1961 as vice chairman. Bank of America named him president and chief executive in 1963. He retired at the end of 1969 and was succeeded by Alden W. Clausen. In 1972, Peterson became the second Administrator of the United Nations Development Programme, managing that body's economic assistance activities throughout the world.

Rudolph A. Peterson was the University of California, Berkeley 1967 Alumnus of the Year and received the Chancellor's Award in 1991. In 1965, Peterson was selected to be Swedish-American of the Year by the Swedish Council of America. He later served as chairman of the Board of Directors of the council from 1989 to 1991.

Positions in intergovernmental organisations
Preceded by Paul G. Hoffman	Administrator of the United Nations Development Programme; 1972–1976	Succeeded by F. Bradford Morse
