= Lewis Crampton =

American museum executive

Lewis Sherman Warren Crampton is an American museum executive who served as president and CEO of the Cox Science Center and Aquarium and the Burpee Museum of Natural History. Prior to working as a museum executive, Crampton was a political figure in Massachusetts and held positions with the United States Environmental Protection Agency. He is currently a member of the Palm Beach, Florida town council.

== Early life ==
Crampton was raised in Cohasset, Massachusetts. His father, Savington, was a television producer. Crampton was in the United States Army 1959 to 1961, first as a tank commander in West Germany, then was a drill instructor at Fort Lee. He earned a B.A. in Public and International Affairs from Princeton University and a M.A. in East Asian Studies from Harvard University. While at Harvard, he became a leader of the hippie community on Fort Hill. During the summer of 1966, he organized several "be-ins" in the Greater Boston area. He was also chairman of Avatar, an underground newspaper. He also worked as a consultant to the Rand Corporation. In 1969, he married Kathleen Hoyt Ridder, granddaughter of Victor F. Ridder.

== Political career ==
In 1967, Crampton was a delegate to the Massachusetts Republican convention. In 1971, he worked for Thomas I. Atkins campaign for Mayor of Boston. When Atkins became state Secretary of Communities and Development, Crampton became assistant secretary. In 1973, Crampton he was appointed commissioner of community affairs by Governor Francis Sargent.

In 1978, Crampton was the Republican nominee for Massachusetts Treasurer. He lost to incumbent Robert Q. Crane 60% to 40%. In 1980, Crampton led a collation to remove Massachusetts Republican Party chairman Gordon M. Nelson. On April 8, 1980, Nelson was defeated by State Representative Andrew Natsios 41 votes to 35.

From 1981 to 1983, Crampton was the director of management systems and evaluation of the United States Environmental Protection Agency. In 1984, he challenged Gerry E. Studds for the United States House of Representatives seat in Massachusetts's 10th congressional district. From 1989 to 1992, he returned to the EPA as associate administrator for communications. After leaving the EPA, he served as vice president of communications and environmental affairs for Waste Management and vice president of communications for the American Medical Association.

Crampton was elected to the group 1 seat on the Palm Beach, Florida town council in 2018 and was reelected in 2020, 2022, 2024, and 2026.

== Museum executive ==
In 1999, Crampton was appointed interim president of the Chicago Academy of Sciences, which ran the Peggy Notebaert Nature Museum. From 2001 to 2007, Crampton was president of the Burpee Museum of Natural History. Soon after taking the job, Crampton decided to make a dinosaur the a feature exhibit of the new 46,000-square foot museum. In the summer of 2001, an expedition led by Burpee Museum curator Michael Henderson in the Hell Creek Formation in southeastern Montana led to the discovery of the skeleton of a juvenile Tyrannosaurus rex. The animal, which was named Jane, was the third most complete Tyrannosaurus rex skeleton ever found.

In 2010, Crampton became CEO of the Cox Science Center and Aquarium (then known as the South Florida Science Museum). Under his leadership the museum saw attendance increase from 110,000 in 2010 to 378,000 in 2019, went from a having a $120,000 deficit to a surplus in that same time period, and grew from a rundown 14,000-square-foot facility to a 40,000-square-foot building, a 5,000-square-foot education center, and 20,000 square-foot outdoor program area. He stepped down as CEO in 2018 after being elected to the Palm Beach Town Council. He retired as the museum's president on March 27, 2020, but remains on the board of directors.

Party political offices
Vacant Title last held by Frederick Hannon	Republican nominee for Treasurer and Receiver-General of Massachusetts; 1978	Succeeded by Mary J. LeClair
