= Michael J. Connolly =

American politician

Michael Joseph Connolly
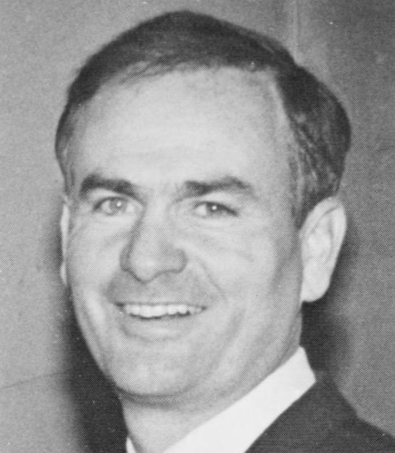

26th Secretary of the Commonwealth of Massachusetts
- In office 1979–1994
- Governor: Edward J. King; Michael Dukakis; Bill Weld
- Preceded by: Paul H. Guzzi
- Succeeded by: William F. Galvin

Member of the Massachusetts House of Representatives
- In office 1973–1978
- Preceded by: Francis X. Coppinger
- Succeeded by: District eliminated
- Constituency: 24th Suffolk District

Personal details
- Born: April 20, 1947 (age 79) Boston, Massachusetts
- Party: Democratic
- Spouse: Lynda M. Connolly
- Children: 4 (including John)
- Education: College of the Holy Cross; New England School of Law
- Occupation: Attorney; Real Estate Developer

Michael Joseph Connolly (born April 20, 1947, in Boston, Massachusetts) is a former politician who served as Massachusetts Secretary of the Commonwealth from 1979 to 1994.

An attorney by profession, Connolly was first elected to public office in 1973 when he won a seat in the Massachusetts House of Representatives.

He was a candidate for the Democratic nomination for Edward Brooke's United States Senate seat in 1978, but he dropped out of the race and instead ran for and was elected Secretary of the Commonwealth. Connolly ran for the Senate again in 1984, losing the nomination to Lieutenant Governor John Kerry.

Connolly served on the Boston Licensing Board, having been appointed in the late 1990s by Governor Paul Cellucci. He served until 2011, when Governor Deval Patrick declined to re-appoint him to continue on the board.

Connolly thereafter was involved in real estate development.

== Family ==
Connolly is married to Lynda M. Connolly, former Chief Justice of the Dedham District Court. They have four children.

Party political offices
Preceded by Paul Guzzi	Democratic nominee for Secretary of the Commonwealth of Massachusetts; 1978, 1982, 1986, 1990	Succeeded by William F. Galvin
Political offices
Preceded by Paul Guzzi	26th Massachusetts Secretary of the Commonwealth; 1979–1994	Succeeded by William F. Galvin
