= John Cornelius Bresnahan =

Massachusetts politician (1919–1983)

Member of the Massachusetts House of Representatives from the 6th Essex district
- In office 1949–1970

Personal details
- Born: November 14, 1919 Lawrence, Massachusetts, US
- Died: July 31, 1983 (aged 63) Lawrence, Massachusetts, US
- Education: University of Notre Dame; Suffolk University Law School; Harvard Kennedy School

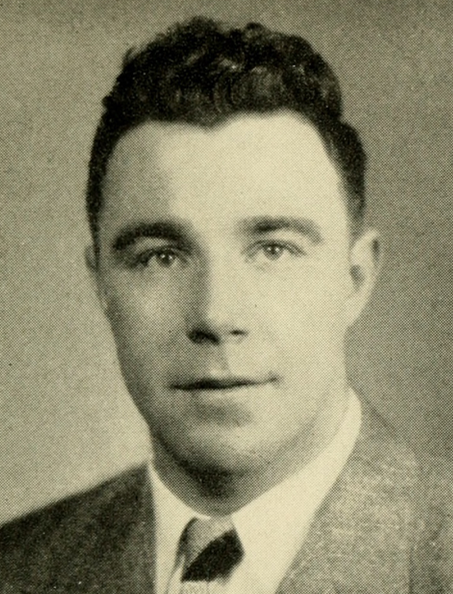
Portrait of John Cornelius Bresnahan, a member of the Massachusetts House of Representatives

John Cornelius Bresnahan (November 14, 1919 – July 31, 1983) was an American politician who was the member of the Massachusetts House of Representatives from the 6th Essex district.
