= F. Bradford Morse =

American politician (1921–1994)

Brad Morse
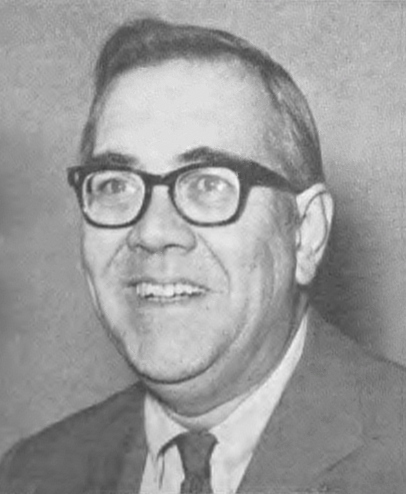
- Morse in 1971

Administrator of the United Nations Development Programme
- In office 1976–1986
- Secretary General: Kurt Waldheim; Javier Pérez de Cuéllar
- Preceded by: Rudolph A. Peterson
- Succeeded by: William Henry Draper III

Member of the U.S. House of Representatives from Massachusetts's 5th district
- In office January 3, 1961 – May 1, 1972
- Preceded by: Edith Nourse Rogers
- Succeeded by: Paul W. Cronin

Personal details
- Born: Frank Bradford Morse; August 7, 1921 Lowell, Massachusetts, U.S.
- Died: December 18, 1994 (aged 73) Naples, Florida, U.S.
- Resting place: Arlington National Cemetery
- Party: Republican
- Education: Boston University (BA, LLB)

Military service
- Allegiance: United States
- Branch/service: United States Army
- Years of service: 1942–1946
- Rank: Second Lieutenant
- Battles/wars: World War II

Frank Bradford Morse (August 7, 1921 – December 18, 1994) was a liberal member of the United States House of Representatives from Massachusetts. He had a notable career in the United States Congress and the United Nations. In Congress, he served in various capacities for nearly twenty years, the last twelve as Congressman from Lowell, Massachusetts. In 1972, he became Under-Secretary-General of the United Nations and in 1976, the Administrator of the United Nations Development Programme. He received a Franklin D. Roosevelt Four Freedoms Award for his career as an international public servant.

== Biography ==
Morse was born in Lowell, Massachusetts on August 7, 1921, and graduated from Boston University in 1948 and from Boston University School of Law in 1949. He served in World War II in the Army from 1942 to 1946 and was discharged as a second lieutenant. After the war, he served as a private practice lawyer, business executive, law clerk to the Chief Justice of the Supreme Judicial Court of Massachusetts, and professor at Boston University School of Law, 1949–1953. He was elected to the Lowell City Council in 1952 and served there until 1953 when he was employed as a staff member for United States Senate Armed Services Committee, a position he held until 1955. From 1955 until 1958 he served as an executive secretary and chief assistant to United States Senator Leverett Saltonstall, and later as a deputy administrator of Veterans Administration from 1958 to 1960.

During his time in the House, Morse supported the 24th Amendment to the U.S. Constitution, the Civil Rights Act of 1964, the Voting Rights Act of 1965, the Medicare program for the elderly, the Civil Rights Act of 1968, and alongside fellow House Republicans Seymour Halpern, Charles Adams Mosher and Ogden Reid, co-sponsored the Health Security Act, a bipartisan health care bill that would have established a government-run health insurance program to cover every person in America.

After the death of Edith Nourse Rogers in September 1960, he was selected by the Republican Party to take her place on the ballot and was elected as a Republican to the Eighty-seventh Congress in November 1960. He was then re-elected to the five succeeding Congresses (January 3, 1961 – May 1, 1972). In 1966, along with three Republican Senators and four other Republican Representatives, Morse signed a telegram sent to Georgia Governor Carl E. Sanders regarding the Georgia legislature's refusal to seat the recently elected Julian Bond in their state House of Representatives. This refusal, said the telegram, was "a dangerous attack on representative government. None of us agree with Mr. Bond's views on the Vietnam War; in fact, we strongly repudiate these views. But unless otherwise determined by a court of law, which the Georgia Legislature is not, he is entitled to express them."

He became Under Secretary General for Political and General Assembly Affairs at the United Nations from 1972 to 1976. He was then promoted to be the third Administrator of the United Nations Development Programme from 1976 to 1986. From 1986 to 1991, he served as the seventh president of the Salzburg Global Seminar, a non-profit organization based in Salzburg, Austria whose mission is to challenge current and future leaders to develop creative ideas for solving global problems. He died at his home in Naples, Florida on December 18, 1994, and was cremated and placed in Arlington National Cemetery in Arlington, Virginia.

U.S. House of Representatives
Preceded by Edith Nourse Rogers	Member of the U.S. House of Representatives from Massachusetts's 5th congressional district 1961–1972	Succeeded by Paul W. Cronin
Diplomatic posts
Preceded by Rudolph A. Peterson	Administrator of the United Nations Development Programme; 1976–1986	Succeeded by William Henry Draper III
