= John Davoren =

American politician (1915–1997)

John Francis Xavier Davoren
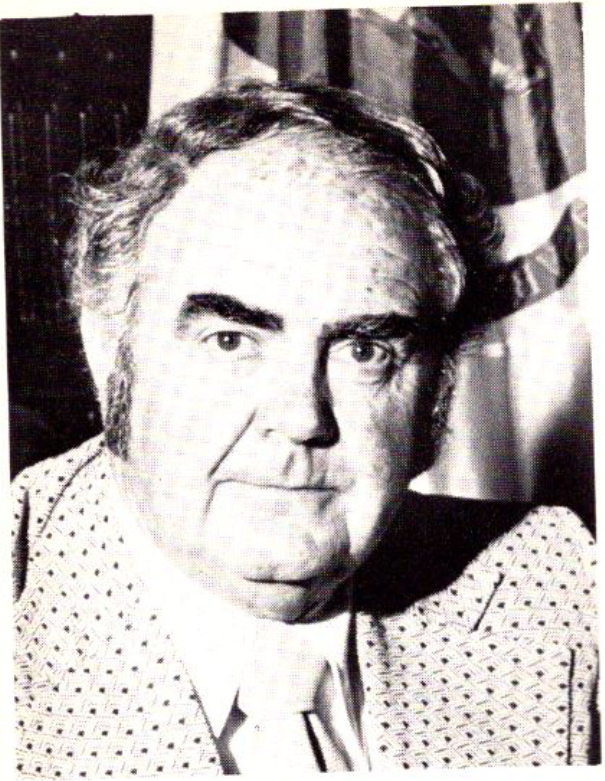

24th Massachusetts Secretary of the Commonwealth
- In office 1967–1974
- Governor: John Volpe; Francis Sargent
- Preceded by: Kevin H. White
- Succeeded by: Paul H. Guzzi

Speaker of the Massachusetts House of Representatives
- In office 1964–1967
- Preceded by: John F. Thompson
- Succeeded by: Robert H. Quinn

Majority Leader of the Massachusetts House of Representatives
- In office 1962–1964
- Preceded by: Cornelius F. Kiernan
- Succeeded by: Robert H. Quinn

Member of the Massachusetts House of Representatives 9th Worcester District
- In office 1955–1967

Personal details
- Born: July 27, 1915 Milford, Massachusetts
- Died: August 24, 1997 (aged 82) Dennis, Massachusetts
- Party: Democratic Party
- Education: College of the Holy Cross (BA)
- Profession: Lawyer, Politician

Military service
- Allegiance: United States of America
- Branch/service: United States Navy
- Battles/wars: World War II

John Francis Xavier Davoren (July 27, 1915 – August 24, 1997) was a U.S. politician who served as a member of the Massachusetts House of Representatives from 1955 to 1967 and Massachusetts Secretary of the Commonwealth from 1967 to 1974. While in the house, he served as the House Majority Leader from 1962 to 1964 and Speaker from 1964 to 1967. Davoren left the House of Representatives in 1967 after he was elected Secretary of the Commonwealth.

== See also ==
- 1955–1956 Massachusetts legislature
- 1965–1966 Massachusetts legislature

Party political offices
| Preceded by Kevin White | Democratic nominee for Secretary of the Commonwealth of Massachusetts; 1970 | Succeeded by Paul Guzzi |
Massachusetts House of Representatives
| Preceded by John F. Thompson | Speaker of the Massachusetts House of Representatives; 1964–1967 | Succeeded by Robert H. Quinn |
Political offices
| Preceded by Kevin H. White | 24th Massachusetts Secretary of the Commonwealth; 1967–1974 | Succeeded by Paul H. Guzzi |
