= William J. Galvin =

American politician

President of the Boston City Council
- In office 1940–1941
- Preceded by: George A. Murray
- Succeeded by: Thomas E. Linehan

Member of the Boston City Council for Ward 2
- In office 1938–1942
- Preceded by: James J. Mellen
- Succeeded by: Michael Leo Kinsella

Personal details
- Born: June 28, 1904 Charlestown
- Died: May 25, 1988 (aged 83) Charlestown
- Party: Democratic
- Spouse: Ella Swanson
- Children: 8
- Relatives: Kevin White (son-in-law)

William J. Galvin (June 28, 1904 – May 25, 1988) was an American politician who served on the Boston City Council and was the city's superintendent of markets.

== Early life ==
Galvin grew up in Charlestown and graduated from Charlestown High School. His first job was at a chocolate factory. During his tenure on the council he was engaged in the real estate business.

== Political career ==
Galvin's first attempt for public office came in 1936, when he was narrowly defeated for a seat in the Massachusetts House of Representatives. The following year he defeated incumbent James J. Mellen for the Ward 2 seat on the Boston City Council. In 1939 he ran for council president. Although he did not win, he was able to block the election of James E. Agnew. In 1940 he was elected council president. From 1940 to 1944, Galvin was also chairman of the Democratic City Committee. He was reelected council president in 1941, becoming only the second councilor to serve two consecutive terms as president. He was defeated for reelection in 1941 by Michael Leo Kinsella.

In 1942, Galvin was appointed Superintendent of Markets by Mayor Maurice J. Tobin. This position was responsible for managing Faneuil Hall and Quincy Market. In 1968 the city auditorium commission appointed him as superintendent of the John B. Hynes Memorial Auditorium. He held this position until his retirement in 1974.

== Personal life ==
Galvin was married to Ella Swanson, a special education instructor. They had one son, William J. Galvin Jr., and seven daughters. In 1956, one of his daughters, Kathryn, married Kevin H. White, the son of Boston City Councilor Joseph C. White. Kevin White served as Mayor of Boston from 1968 to 1984. William J. Galvin Jr. was an unsuccessful candidate for Massachusetts Secretary of the Commonwealth in the 1978 election and was appointed by White to a seat on the Massachusetts Parking Authority, where he succeeded another one of his brothers-in-law.

Galvin died on May 25, 1988, at his home in Charlestown. He was 84 years old. Galvin left his entire estate to his son, save for $1 each left to his daughters. The will was contested by two of his daughters, who reached an out-of-court settlement with Galvin Jr. in 1989.
