= Barry T. Hannon =

American politician (1935–2023)

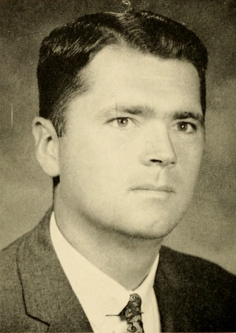
Portrait of Barry T. Hannon

Barry T. Hannon (November 21, 1935 – July 29, 2023) was an American politician. A Democrat, he was a member of the Massachusetts House of Representatives and the Registrar of Deeds for Norfolk County, Massachusetts. He was from Braintree, Massachusetts.

Hannon was often the only candidate in ten elections between 1970 and 1994.
