= Paul Tsongas =

American politician (1941–1997)

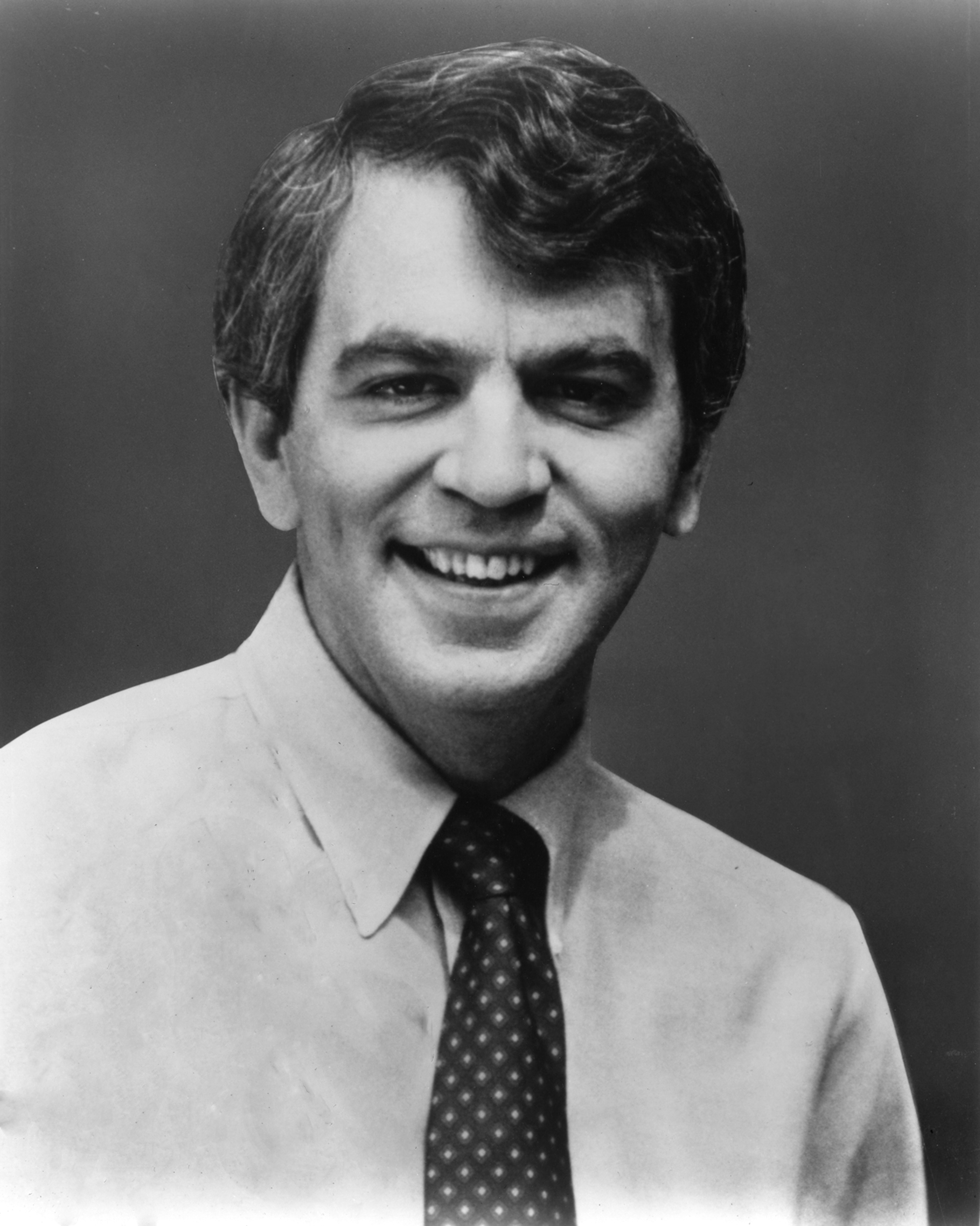
- Official portrait, c. 1979

United States Senator from Massachusetts
- In office January 3, 1979 – January 2, 1985
- Preceded by: Edward Brooke
- Succeeded by: John Kerry

Member of the U.S. House of Representatives from Massachusetts's 5th district
- In office January 3, 1975 – January 3, 1979
- Preceded by: Paul W. Cronin
- Succeeded by: James Shannon

Personal details
- Born: Paul Efthemios Tsongas; February 14, 1941 Lowell, Massachusetts, U.S.
- Died: January 18, 1997 (aged 55) Lowell, Massachusetts, U.S.
- Resting place: Lowell Cemetery
- Party: Democratic
- Spouse: Niki Sauvage (m. 1969)
- Children: 3
- Education: Dartmouth College (BA); Yale University (JD); Harvard University (MPP)

Paul Efthemios Tsongas (/ˈsɒŋɡəs/ SONG-gəs; February 14, 1941 – January 18, 1997) was an American politician who represented Massachusetts in the United States Senate from 1979 until 1985 and in the United States House of Representatives from 1975 until 1979. A member of the Democratic Party, he ran for president in 1992. He won eight contests during the presidential primaries but ultimately lost the nomination to Bill Clinton, who later won the general election.

Born in Lowell, Massachusetts, Tsongas graduated from Dartmouth College, Yale Law School and the Kennedy School of Government. After working for the Peace Corps and as an aide to Congressman F. Bradford Morse, Tsongas successively won election as a city councilor and county commissioner. In 1974, Tsongas was elected to the House of Representatives representing Massachusetts's 5th congressional district, after defeating incumbent Paul W. Cronin. In 1978, he ran for the Senate, and defeated incumbent Republican Edward Brooke.

In Congress, Tsongas established a reputation as a social liberal and fiscal conservative. Tsongas was diagnosed with non-Hodgkin lymphoma in 1983 and declined to seek re-election in 1984. He returned to politics after undergoing a successful bone marrow transplant. He experienced early success in the 1992 Democratic presidential primaries, winning the New Hampshire primary, but withdrew from the race in March 1992 and endorsed Clinton. An opponent of deficit spending, Tsongas co-founded the Concord Coalition. He died in 1997 of complications from pneumonia and non-Hodgkin lymphoma.

== Early life ==
Tsongas was born in Lowell, Massachusetts, along with a twin sister, Thaleia, to a once working-class family who came to own a very successful dry cleaning business in Lowell. His father, Efthemios George Tsongas, was a Greek immigrant, and his mother, Katina (née Pappas; originally Panagiotopoulos), was of Greek descent.

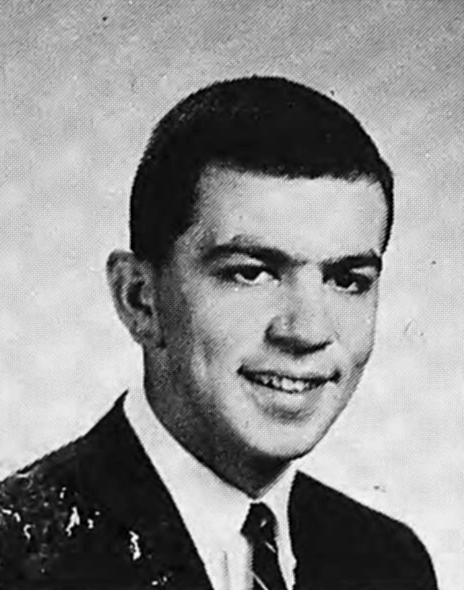
Tsongas in the Dartmouth College yearbook, 1962

After graduating from Lowell High School in 1958, Tsongas attended Dartmouth College, graduating in 1962 with a B.A. in economics, then Yale Law School and the John F. Kennedy School of Government at Harvard University before settling in Lowell, Massachusetts. While at Dartmouth, Tsongas was a member of the men's swimming team. He picked up the sport again, 27 years later, in 1986, after doctors suggested swimming as a way to rebuild his lung capacity while he was recovering from lymphoma. At a YMCA Masters meet, Tsongas once remarked, "I always used to say breaststroke was an athletic event and the butterfly was the political statement."

Tsongas served as a Peace Corps volunteer in Ethiopia from 1962 to 1964, and as Peace Corps Country Director in the West Indies from 1967 to 1968. In 1967, Tsongas – working as an aide to Congressman F. Bradford Morse – met Niki Sauvage, who was spending the summer in Arlington, Virginia. They were married in 1969, and had three daughters: Ashley, Katina, and Molly. Niki Tsongas was a U.S. Representative from Massachusetts from 2007 to 2019. When Tsongas ran for office, out of concern that people would pronounce the silent T in his last name, the campaign distributed bumper stickers saying "Tsenator Tsongas".

== Political career ==
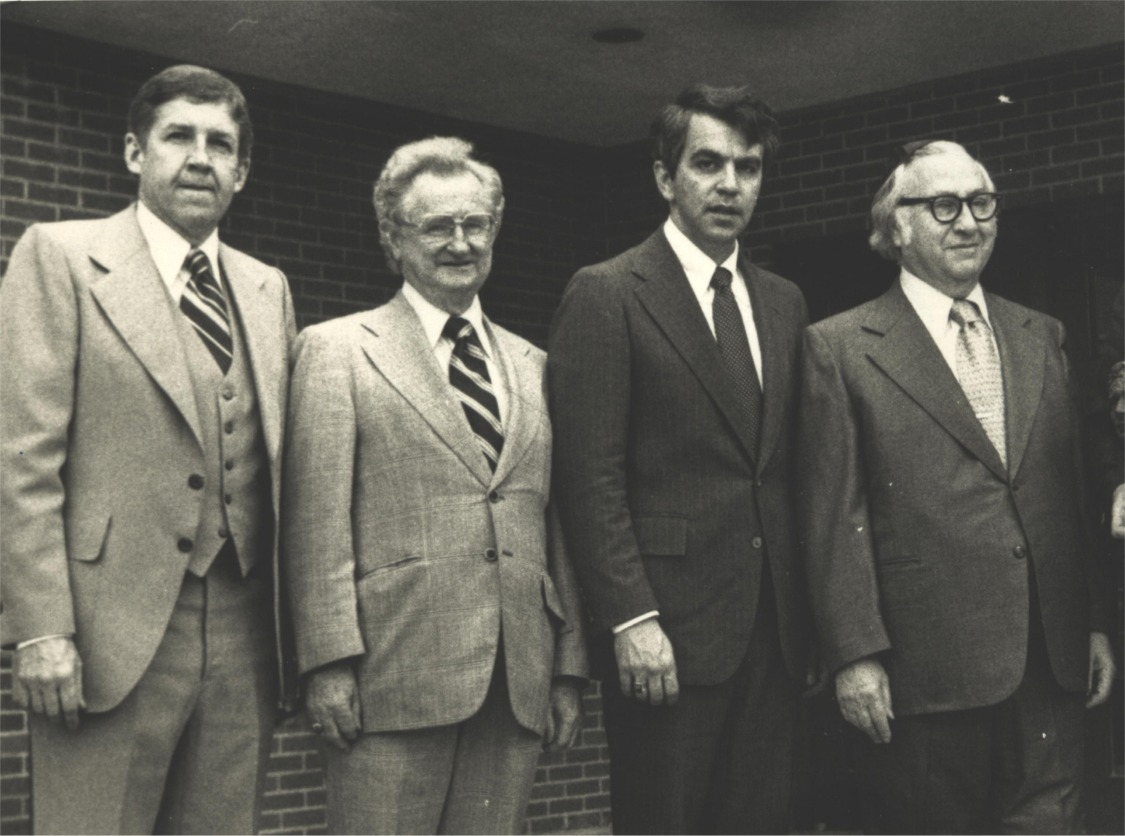
Tsongas (2nd from right), pictured here in 1970, was elected to the Lowell City Council in 1969.

Tsongas first entered politics as a city councilor, elected to the Lowell City Council in 1969 where he served two consecutive terms. Tsongas went on to serve as a county commissioner of Middlesex County, Massachusetts. In 1974, he ran for United States House of Representatives from a district anchored by Lowell. The district had elected only three Democrats in its entire existence and had been in Republican hands continuously since 1895. However, in the massive Democratic wave of the post-Watergate election of 1974, he defeated freshman Republican Paul W. Cronin by a 21-point margin. He was reelected in 1976, becoming the first Democrat to hold the district for more than one term.

== U.S. Senator ==
Increasingly popular and well-liked in Massachusetts, in 1978 he was elected to the United States Senate, defeating incumbent Republican Edward Brooke by 202,699 votes.

In 1983, Tsongas was diagnosed with non-Hodgkin's lymphoma, and in 1984 announced his retirement from the Senate. His seat went to a fellow Democrat, 2004 presidential nominee and future United States Secretary of State John Kerry. After undergoing a bone marrow transplant to treat the disease in 1986 and receiving a clean bill of health from doctors in 1991, he returned to politics, running for his party's nomination for President in 1992. Until the 1992 campaign, Tsongas had never lost an election. He was the first former Peace Corps volunteer elected to the U.S. Senate (1978). In 1974, he and Chris Dodd were the first elected to the U.S. House of Representatives.

In October 1979, after the Senate Energy and Natural Resources Committee voted in favor of Alaska public lands legislation, President Jimmy Carter issued a statement thanking Tsongas for his leadership in strengthening the bill. In May 1982, Tsongas was one of eight senators to vote against a $177.9 billion military authorization bill for 1983 that provided money for chemical weapons. In July 1982, Tsongas met with Prime Minister of Israel Menachem Begin, questioning Begin over where negotiations would fit in the event that Chairman of the Palestine Liberation Organization Yasser Arafat concede Israel's right to exist along with reneging the Palestinian National Covenant over calls for Israel's abolition and replacement by a secular state. Tsongas afterward stated the meetings were distressing.

During a May 27, 1983, hearing on the legal effects of the Equal Rights Amendment, the first in over a decade on the amendment, Tsongas was questioned by Utah Senator Orrin Hatch over the measure, being described by The New York Times as "visibly shaken by the treatment Senator Hatch gave him". Tsongas delivered an opening statement and replied "That issue will be decided in the courts" in response to most questions by Hatch.

=== Political positions ===
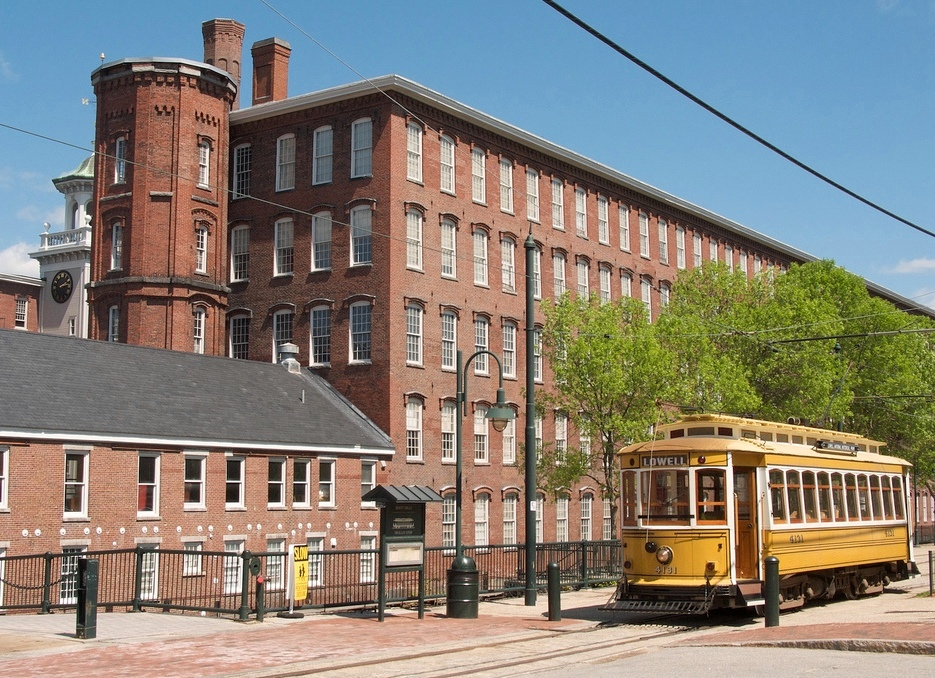
Boott Cotton Mill, Museum and Trolley – Lowell Nat'l. Historical Park

Tsongas was generally viewed as socially liberal and moderate economically. He was especially known for his efforts in Congress in support of historic preservation and environmental conservation on one hand, and for his pro-business economic policies on the other. He played a major role while in the House in the creation of Lowell National Historical Park, as well as in the establishment or expansion of a number of other National Park System areas.

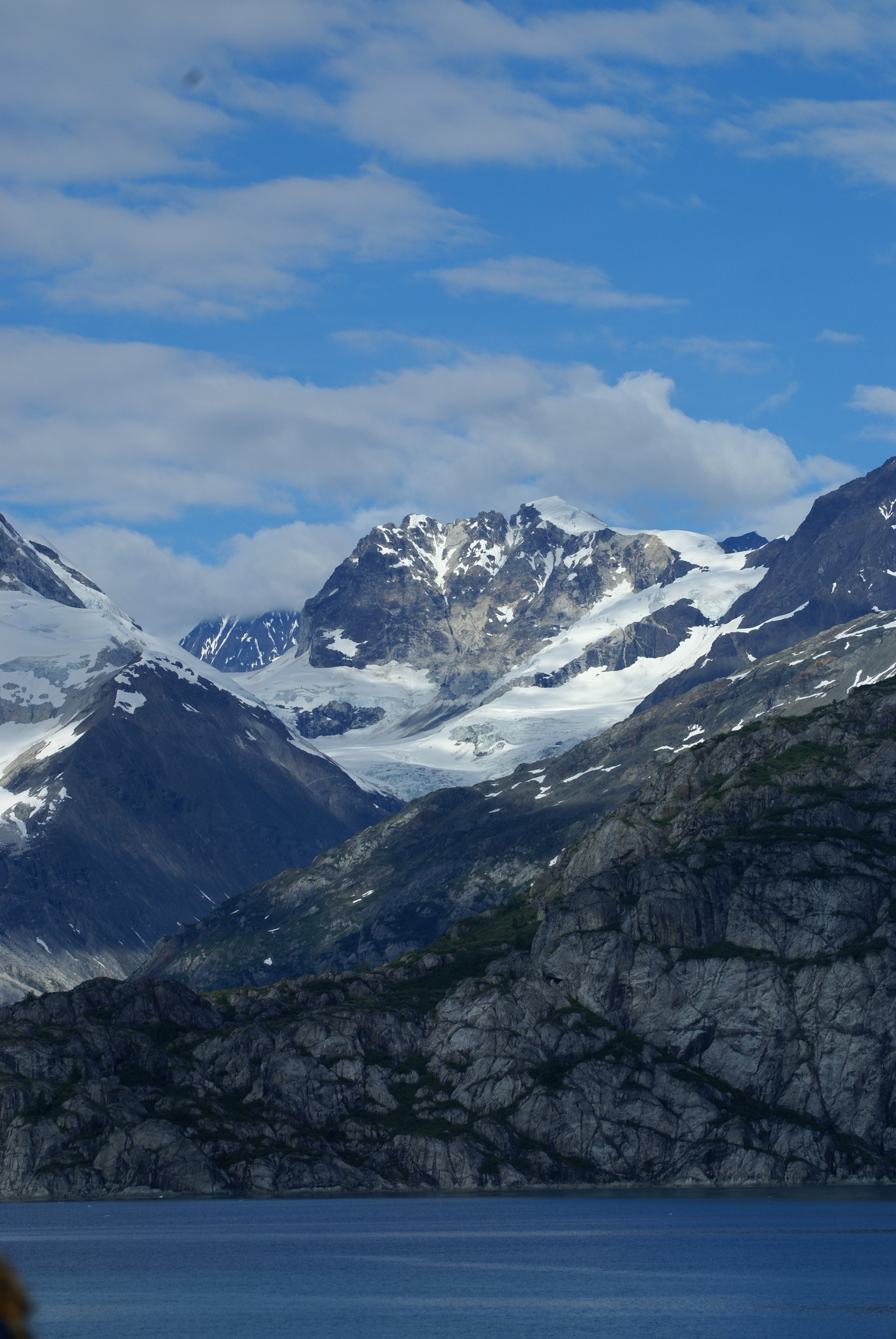
Glacier Bay National Park and Preserve in Alaska

Tsongas played an equally key role later in the Senate, working closely with then Interior Secretary Cecil Andrus, in successful passage of the massive Alaska National Interest Lands Conservation Act of 1980, which had been hopelessly deadlocked in the Senate since its original passage by the House in 1978. Relative to business and economic matters, Tsongas focused in particular on the federal budget deficit, a cause he continued to champion even after his presidential primary campaign ended, by co-founding the Concord Coalition.

Tsongas was criticized on occasion by opponents as a Reaganomics-style politician, and as being closer to Republicans with regard to such issues. The Boston Herald editorialized that his political philosophy had "far more in common" with 1990s-era Republican Mitt Romney (who crossed over to vote for Tsongas in the 1992 primaries) than with traditional Massachusetts Democrats like Ted Kennedy. In the mid-1980s, he upset many of the members of the Americans for Democratic Action by advising them that they should focus more on economic growth than wealth redistribution. He once quipped, "If anyone thinks the words 'government' and 'efficiency' belong in the same sentence, we have counselling available."

== 1992 presidential campaign ==
=== Primaries ===
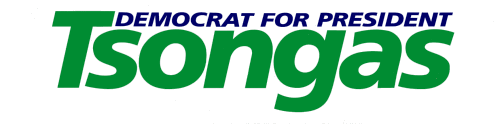
Tsongas presidential campaign bumper sticker

Described as a "long shot campaign" by the New York Times, Paul Tsongas was the first Democrat to launch a bid for the 1992 presidential election, on April 30, 1991 in his hometown of Lowell, Massachusetts. The Tsongas campaign was banking heavily on early success in New Hampshire. Like many of the candidates, Tsongas ignored the 1992 contest in Iowa, which was expected to go overwhelmingly to Iowa's Senator Tom Harkin. Tsongas hoped that his New England independence and fiscal conservatism from neighboring Massachusetts would appeal to Granite Staters. He achieved recognition for the bluntness and clarity of his plan, distributing a short book titled A Call to Economic Arms, which focused on such issues as the growing federal deficit. When asked why he did not have a tax cut plan like the other candidates, Tsongas famously answered, "I'm not trying to play Santa Claus."

==== New Hampshire ====
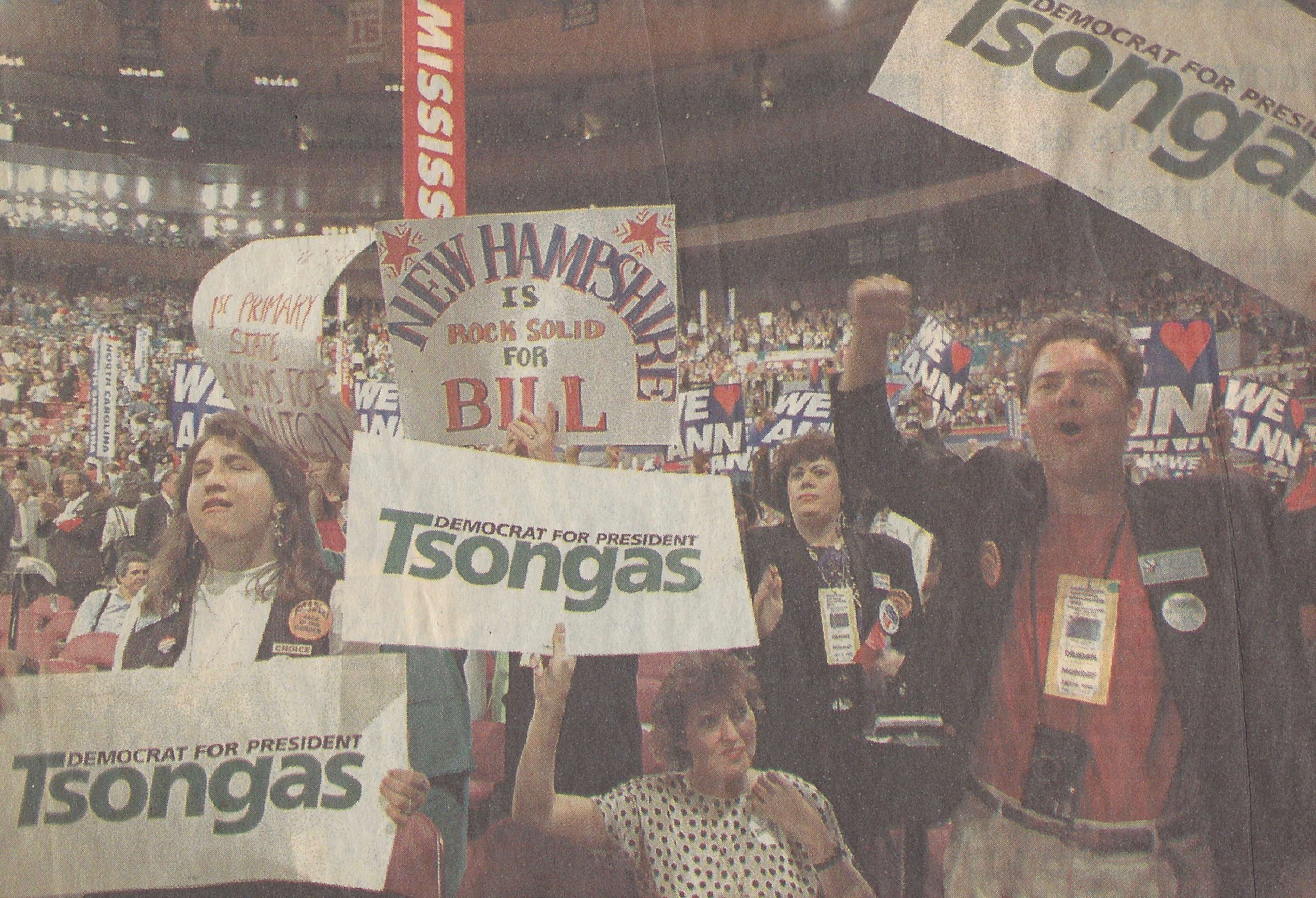
New Hampshire delegates for Tsongas on the DNC convention floor

During the early weeks of 1992 things seemed to be going Tsongas's way when one major candidate, Bill Clinton, stumbled over issues involving marital infidelity and avoidance of the military draft during the Vietnam War. But Clinton's setback proved temporary, bottoming out weeks before the New Hampshire primary so that while Tsongas won the most votes, and was declared the winner, the margin of 33.2% to 24.78% gave each candidate 9 delegates. Clinton adviser James Carville then tagged his man "the Comeback Kid" and declared his campaign back on track, leaving Tsongas, still ostensibly the front-runner, to be seen by many as the underdog heading into Super Tuesday.

==== After NH ====
Following New Hampshire, Tsongas was unable to match Clinton's fundraising. Clinton went on to win most of the Super Tuesday delegate contests. Tsongas won the primaries in Delaware, Maryland, Arizona, Washington, Utah and Massachusetts, but his campaign never recovered from Clinton's comeback.

=== Convention ===
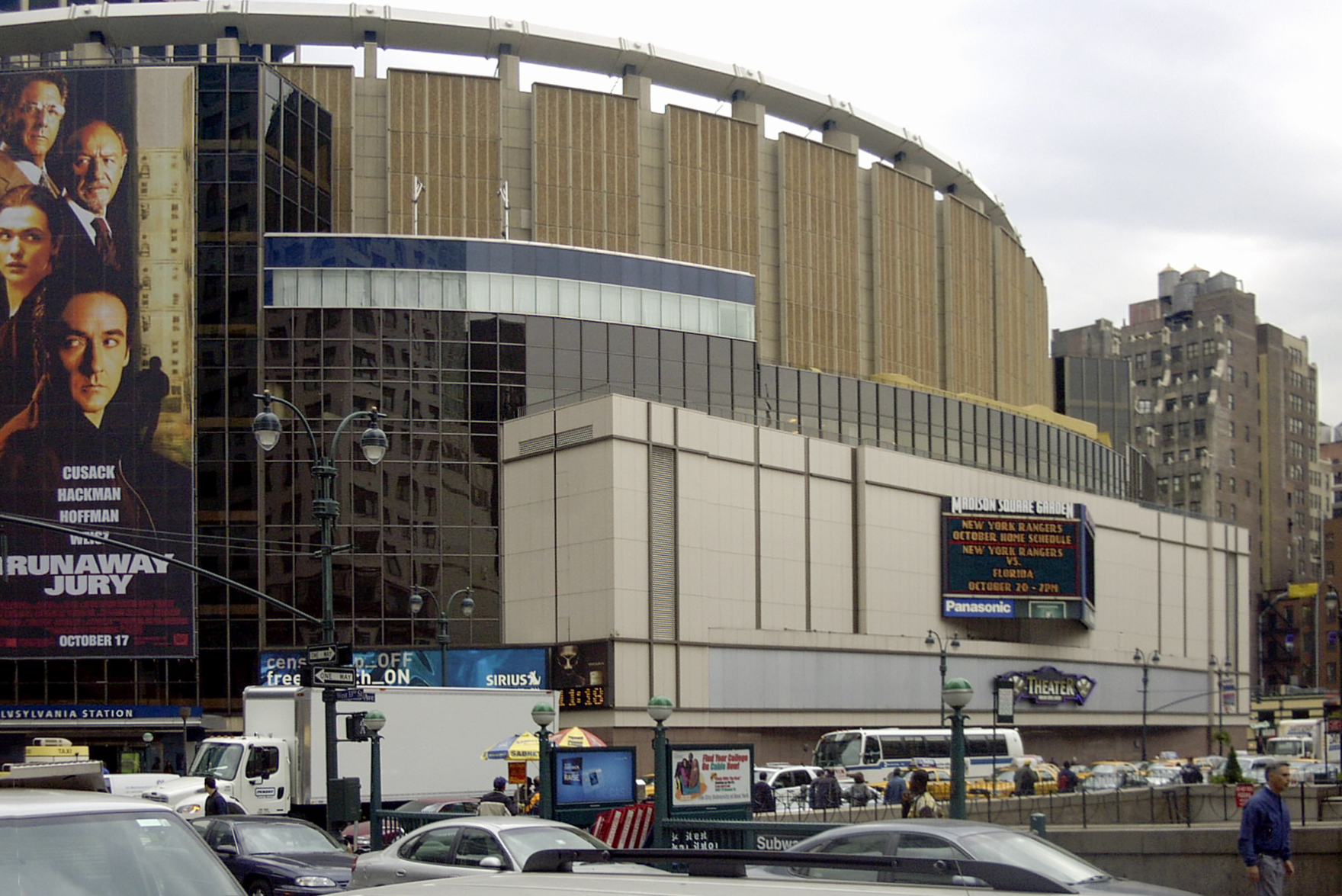
Madison Square Garden, site of the 1992 Democratic National Convention

Tsongas pulled out of the race on March 19, 1992, and endorsed Clinton. However, a number of the Tsongas delegates continued to support the former Senator, and voted for Tsongas on the first ballot at the Convention. The roll call yielded 289 votes for Tsongas, placing him in 3rd place behind Clinton and then-former California Governor, Jerry Brown. During the convention Tsongas tried to include a platform plank calling for a delay in tax cuts or tax credits until the budget could be balanced, which was overwhelmingly defeated.

On October 13, 1993, Tsongas's friend and fundraiser Nicholas Rizzo pleaded guilty to charges of embezzling more than $1 million from the Tsongas presidential campaign. Prosecutors claimed that the embezzlement caused the campaign to stall at a critical point.

== Post-Senate career ==
In late 1994, Tsongas briefly led an effort to establish a third party, to be led by someone with "national authority", suggesting General Colin Powell for that role. By that time, Tsongas was considered "the most popular political figure in Massachusetts".

== Death and legacy ==
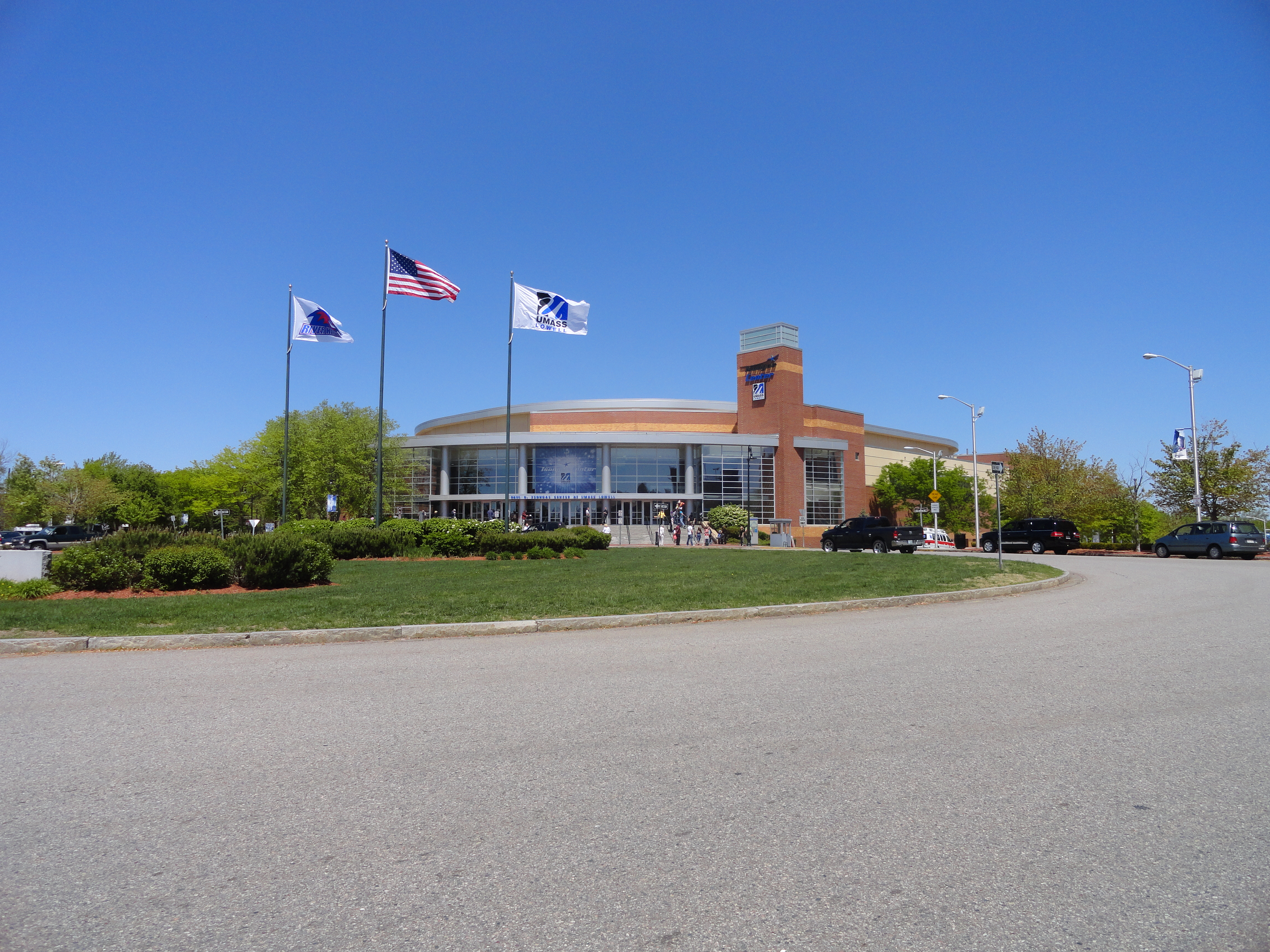
Tsongas Center, Lowell, Massachusetts

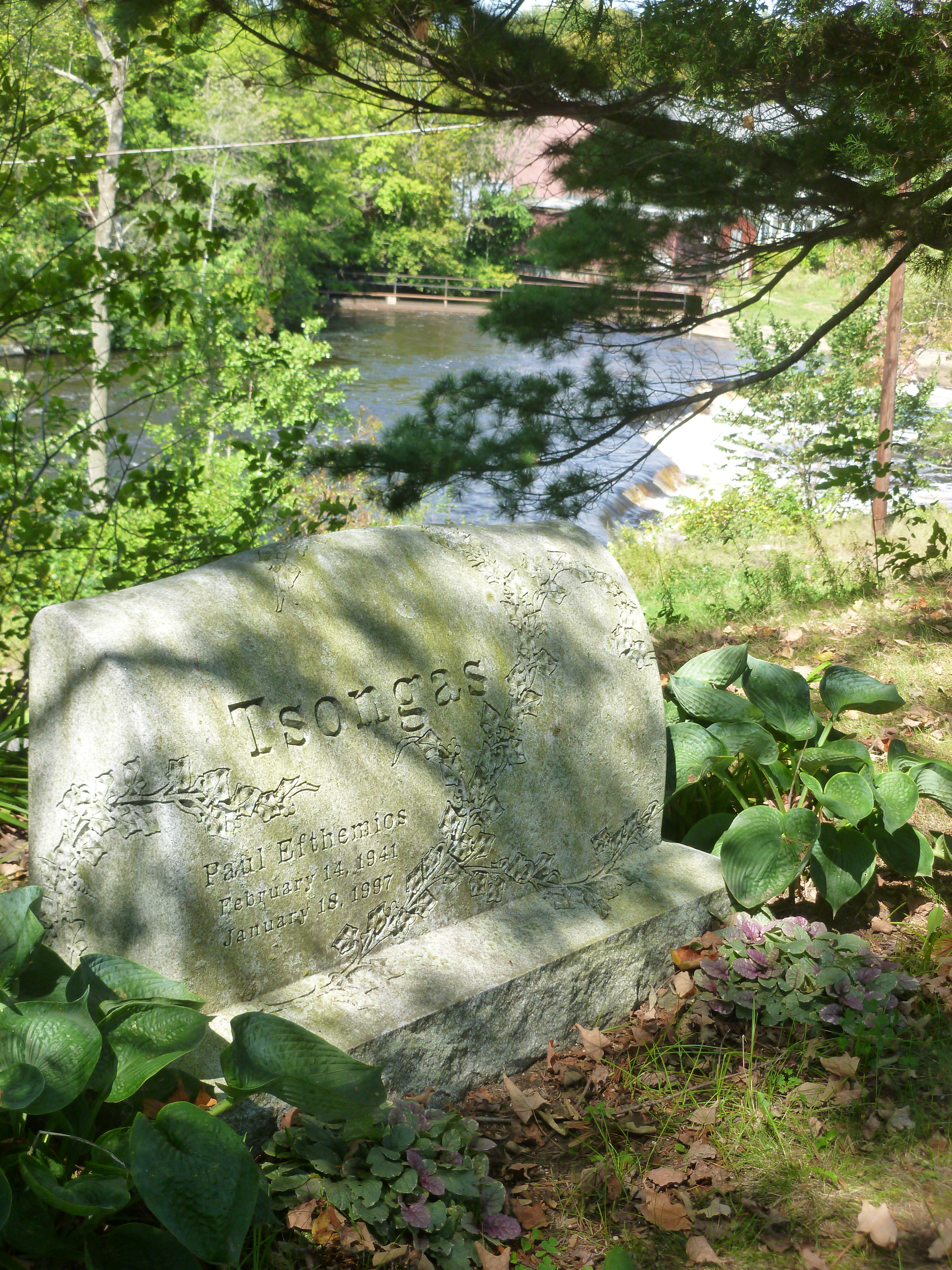
Tsongas's gravestone in Lowell Cemetery

Tsongas died on January 18, 1997, aged 55, of complications from pneumonia and non-Hodgkin lymphoma. His funeral was held at Transfiguration Greek Orthodox Church. His obituary in the New York Times of January 20, 1997 states:

Mr. Tsongas, who was hospitalized on Jan. 3 with a liver problem related to his treatments for non-Hodgkin's lymphoma, a slow-growing cancer of the lymph system, and later developed pneumonia, died at Brigham and Women's Hospital. Mr. Tsongas made his survival from cancer an issue in his Presidential campaign when he and two of his doctors, Dr. Tak Takvorian and Dr. George P. Canellos, said he had been cancer-free since a bone-marrow transplant in 1986. In May 1996, he underwent another transplant, getting bone marrow from his twin sister, Thaleia Schlesinger, to correct myelodysplasia, a bone-marrow disorder that can occur in people who have recovered from lymph cancer.

On January 27, 1998, the Tsongas Center in Lowell was dedicated in his honor. In a special election held on October 16, 2007, his widow, Niki, won the Massachusetts Congressional seat that Tsongas once held. Preservation Massachusetts, a statewide nonprofit focused on preserving Massachusetts history, has an annual Paul Tsongas Award to honor restoration workers in the state.

== Electoral history ==
Massachusetts 5th district, 1974

- Paul Tsongas (D) - 99,518 (60.64%)
- Paul W. Cronin (R) (inc.) - 64,596 (39.36%)

Massachusetts 5th district, 1976

- Paul Tsongas (D) (inc.) - 144,217 (67.31%)
- Roger P. Durkin (D) - 70,036 (32.69%)

1978 Massachusetts United States Senate Democratic primary

- Paul Tsongas - 296,915 (35.55%)
- Paul Guzzi - 258,960 (31.01%)
- Kathleen Alioto - 161,036 (19.28%)
- Howard Phillips - 65,397 (7.83%)
- Elaine Noble - 52,464 (6.28%)
- Others - 379 (0.05%)

1978 Massachusetts United States Senate election

- Paul Tsongas (D) - 1,093,283 (55.06%)
- Edward Brooke (R) (inc.) - 890,584 (44.85%)
- Others - 1,833 (0.09%)

1992 United States Democratic presidential primaries

- Bill Clinton - 10,482,411 (52.01%)
- Jerry Brown - 4,071,232 (20.20%)
- Paul Tsongas - 3,656,010 (18.14%)
- Unpledged - 750,873 (3.73%)
- Bob Kerrey - 318,457 (1.58%)
- Tom Harkin - 280,304 (1.39%)
- Lyndon LaRouche - 154,599 (0.77%)
- Eugene McCarthy - 108,678 (0.54%)
- Charles Woods - 88,948 (0.44%)
- Larry Agran - 58,611 (0.29%)
- Ross Perot (write-in) - 54,755 (0.27%)
- Ralph Nader (write-in) - 35,935 (0.18%)
- Louis J. Stokes - 29,983 (0.15%)

== See also ==
- 1992 Democratic Party presidential primaries
- Atari Democrat

U.S. House of Representatives
Preceded by Paul W. Cronin	Member of the U.S. House of Representatives from Massachusetts's 5th congressional district 1975–1979	Succeeded by James Michael Shannon
Party political offices
Preceded by John J. Droney	Democratic nominee for U.S. Senator from Massachusetts (Class 2); 1978	Succeeded by John Kerry
Preceded by Robert Byrd, Alan Cranston, Al Gore, Gary Hart, Bennett Johnston, Ted Kennedy, Tip O'Neill, Don Riegle, Paul Sarbanes, Jim Sasser	Response to the State of the Union address 1983; Served alongside: Les AuCoin, Joe Biden, Bill Bradley, Robert Byrd, Tom Daschle, Bill Hefner, Barbara Kennelly, George Miller, Tip O'Neill, Paul Simon, Tim Wirth	Succeeded by Max Baucus, Joe Biden, David Boren, Barbara Boxer, Robert Byrd, Dante Fascell, Bill Gray, Tom Harkin, Dee Huddleston, Carl Levin, Tip O'Neill, Claiborne Pell
U.S. Senate
Preceded by Edward Brooke	U.S. Senator (Class 2) from Massachusetts; 1979–1985; Served alongside: Ted Kennedy	Succeeded by John Kerry
