= Paul Guzzi =

American politician

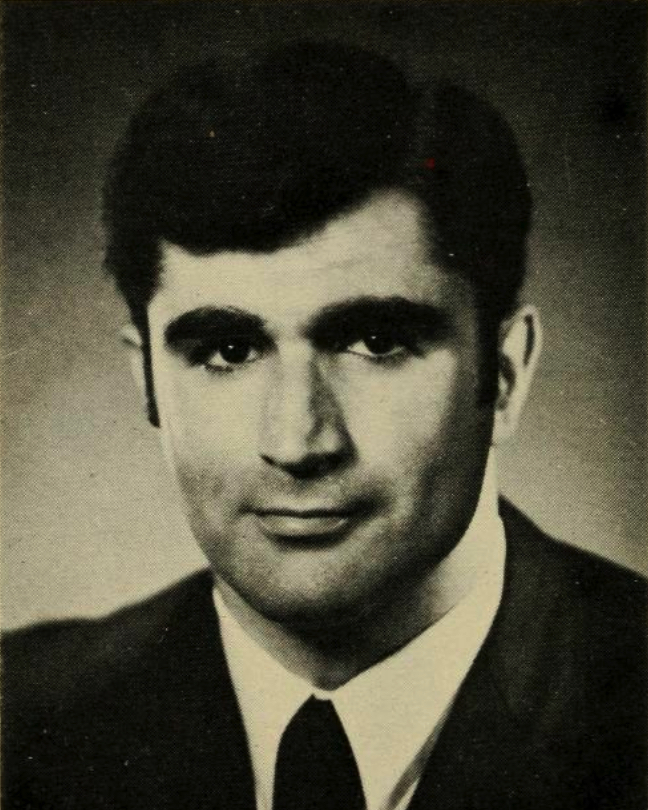

25th Massachusetts Secretary of the Commonwealth
- In office 1975–1979
- Governor: Michael Dukakis
- Preceded by: John F. X. Davoren
- Succeeded by: Michael J. Connolly

Member of the Massachusetts House of Representatives from the 12th Middlesex district
- In office January 6, 1971 – January 8, 1975
- Preceded by: H. James Shea Jr.
- Succeeded by: Robert A. Manzelli

Personal details
- Born: Paul Henry Guzzi; June 17, 1942 (age 84) Newton, Massachusetts, U.S.
- Party: Democratic
- Spouse: Joanne Guzzi
- Education: Harvard University (AB)
- Profession: Teacher

Paul Henry Guzzi (born June 17, 1942) is an American businessman and former Massachusetts Secretary of the Commonwealth. He was president and chief executive officer of the Greater Boston Chamber of Commerce for 19 years.

== Biography ==
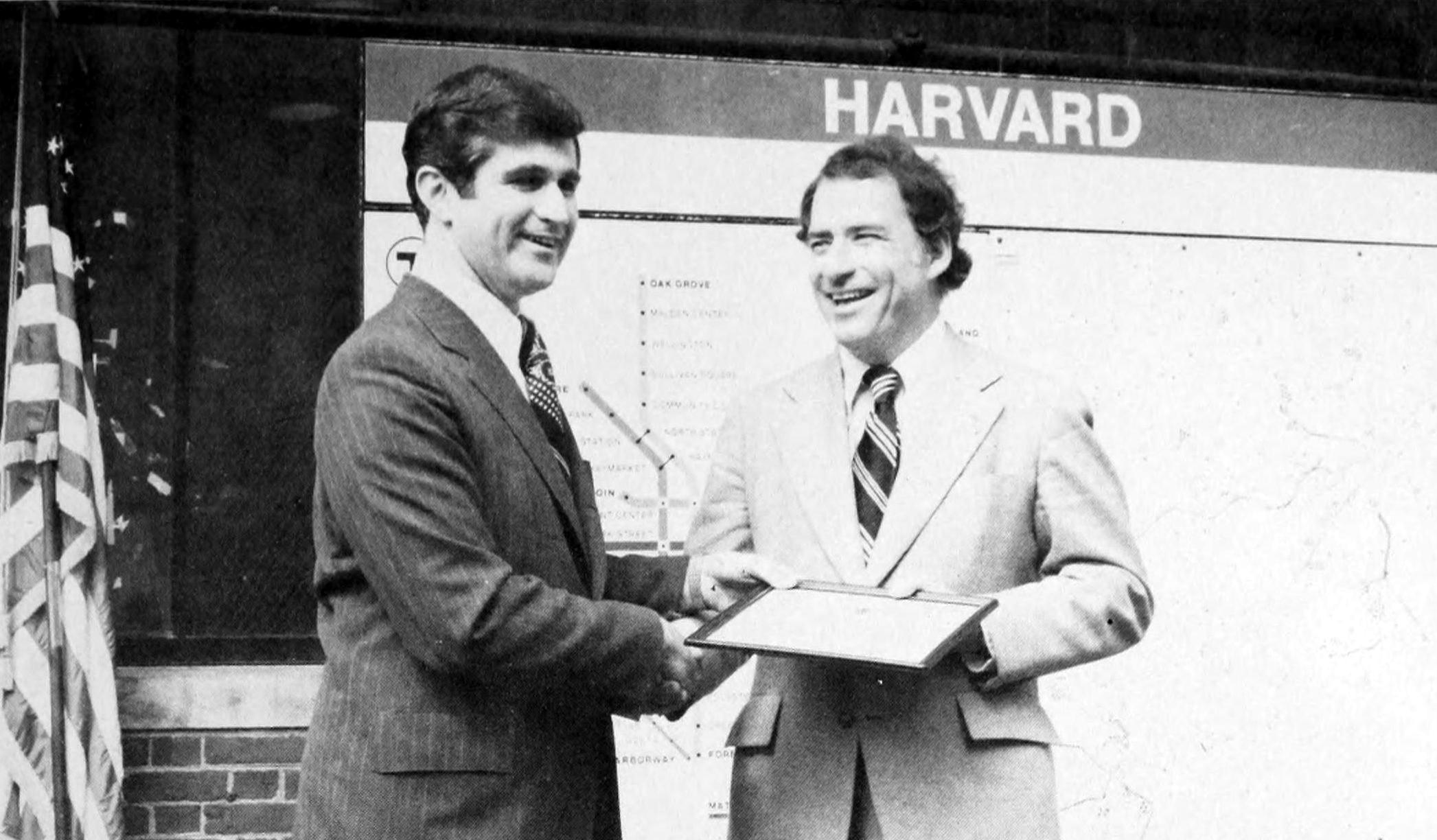
Guzzi (left) as Secretary of the Commonwealth in 1978

Paul Guzzi graduated from Harvard University with a degree in government.

Guzzi was a member of the Massachusetts House of Representatives from 1971 to 1974. In the 1974 general election Guzzi defeated Republican state Senator John M. Quinlan to be elected Secretary of the Commonwealth. Guzzi served as Secretary from 1975 to 1978. In 1978, Guzzi ran for the United States Senate, he was defeated in the Democratic primary by Paul Tsongas. He then served as chief of staff to Massachusetts Governor Ed King. In 1980 Guzzi was named interim chancellor of the newly formed Massachusetts Board of Regents for Public Higher Education.

Guzzi was a senior vice president of Wang Laboratories from 1981 to 1991. He was a vice president at Data General from 1991 to 1993.

Guzzi served as president and CEO of the Greater Boston Chamber of Commerce from 1996 to 2015. He has served as a director of several corporations. Guzzi is also a trustee of the Citi Performing Arts Center and a director of The Boston Foundation. Guzzi is co-host of This Week in Business on the New England Cable News network.

Party political offices
Preceded by John Davoren	Democratic nominee for Secretary of the Commonwealth of Massachusetts; 1974	Succeeded by Michael J. Connolly
Political offices
Preceded by John F. X. Davoren	25th Massachusetts Secretary of the Commonwealth; 1975–1978	Succeeded by Michael J. Connolly
