= Massachusetts Democratic Party =

Massachusetts affiliate of the Democratic Party

- Chairperson: Steve Kerrigan
- Governor: Maura Healey
- Lieutenant Governor: Kim Driscoll
- Senate President: Karen Spilka
- House Speaker: Ronald Mariano
- Headquarters: Boston, Massachusetts
- Membership (2025): ▼1,298,603
- National affiliation: Democratic Party
- Colors: Blue
- Seats in the U.S. Senate: 2 / 2
- Seats in the U.S. House: 9 / 9
- Statewide executive offices: 6 / 6
- Seats in the State Senate: 35 / 40
- Seats in the State House: 134 / 160

Election symbol

Website
- www.massdems.org

The Massachusetts Democratic Party (MassDems) is the affiliate of the Democratic Party in Massachusetts. It is chaired by Steve Kerrigan and is the dominant party in the state, controlling all nine of the state's U.S. House seats, both U.S. Senate seats, all six elected statewide offices including the governorship, and supermajorities in both houses of the state legislature.

== Overview ==
Headquartered in Boston, Massachusetts, the Massachusetts Democratic State Committee is responsible for publicizing the platform of the Massachusetts Democratic Party, the state affiliate of the United States Democratic Party. According to the party charter, the State Committee is charged with conducting state-level campaigns for the Democratic Party, coordinating efforts to fill vacancies in nominating candidates to state and congressional offices, and creating and disseminating information regarding official Democratic Party policies and positions. The Committee also engages in fundraising initiatives to support its operations, and coordinates local caucuses and the Democratic State Conventions.

The State Committee comprises 160 elected members, and add-on and ex officio seats, all of whom must be registered Democrats. As of 2024, officers include: Steve Kerrigan, Chair; Debra Kozikowski, Vice-Chair; Leon Brathwaite, Vice-Chair; Carol Aloisi, Secretary; Tara Healey, Treasurer; Gus Bickford, Chair Emeritus. Joe Sherlock serves as Executive Director. Members include two women and two men from each state senatorial district, Democratic National Committee members from Massachusetts, and roughly 120 additional committee members comprising various underrepresented minority groups, including veterans, gay and lesbian citizens, and college-aged youth representatives. Democratic statewide officers, Governor's Councilors, US Representatives and Senators, and the top Democrat in each chamber of the state legislature are ex officio members. Any person who has served for twenty years on the state committee remains a member so long as that person remains registered as a Democrat in Massachusetts.

Eighty of the State Committee members (one of each gender per Senate district) must be elected through presidential primary ballots. The other 80 (one of each gender per Senate district) are elected at Senate district conferences by local town and ward committee members. All State Committee members serve four-year terms. There are numerous subcommittees are of the Massachusetts Democratic State Committee, including the Affirmative Action and Outreach Committee, the By-Laws Committee, the Campaign Services Committee, the Charter Amendments Committee, the Communications Committee, the Credentials Committee, the Disability Outreach Committee, the Field Services Committee, the Finance Committee, the LGBT Outreach Committee, the Labor Outreach Committee, the Massachusetts Democratic Latino Caucus Committee, the Public Policy Committee, the Rules Committee, the Rural Committee, the Internship-Scholarship Committee, the Senior Outreach Committee, the Site Selection Committee, the State Judicial Council Committee, the Veterans and Military Families Outreach Committee, the Women's Outreach Committee, and the Youth Services Committee. Subcommittees are chaired by State Committee members.

== History ==
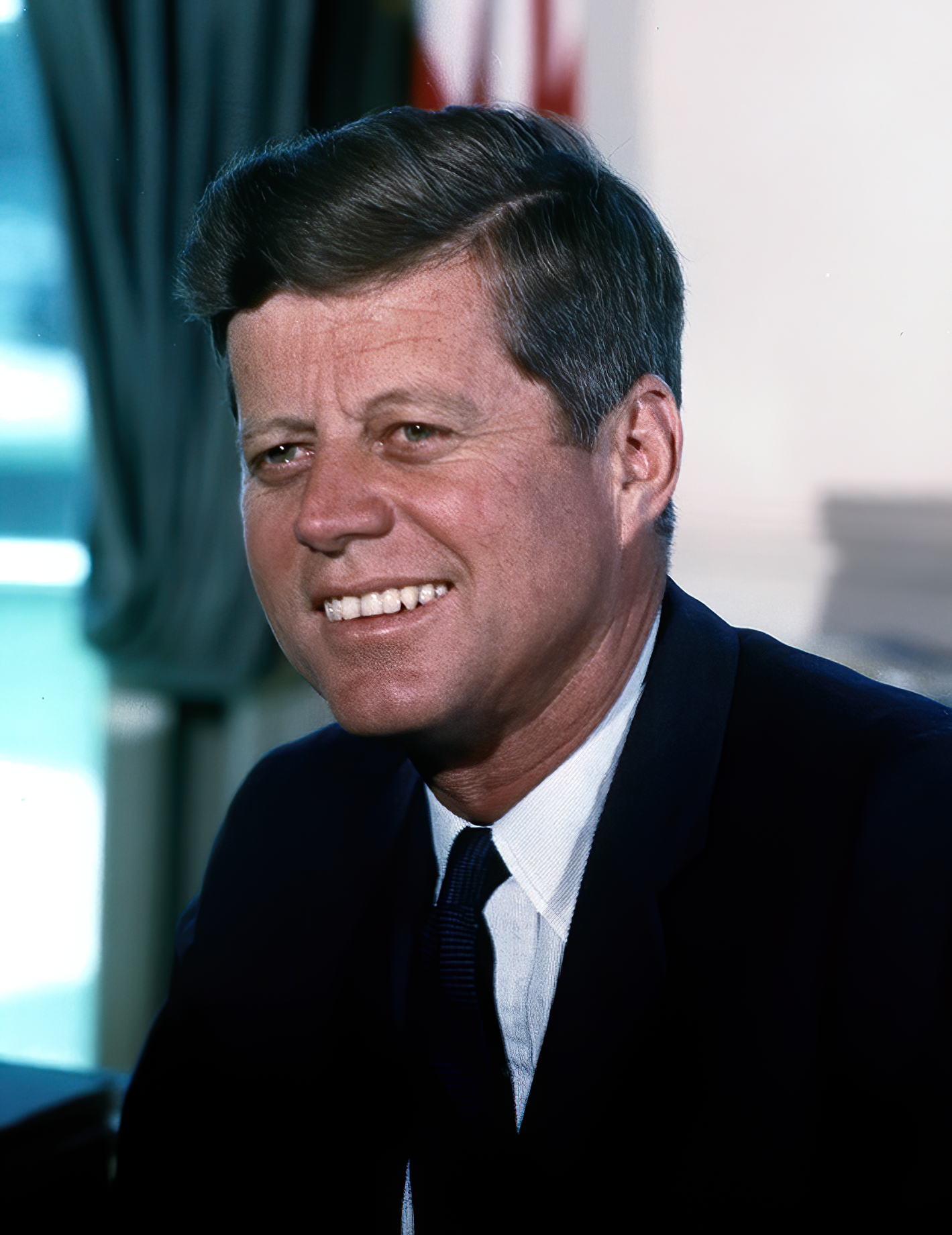
President John F. Kennedy (1961–1963)

The Massachusetts Democratic Party and the National Democratic Party trace their roots to the latter half of the 18th century, when politicians forged alliances based on common national interests. In 1792, Thomas Jefferson founded the Democratic-Republican Party, commonly referred to as the "party of the common man." Jefferson's new party was adamantly opposed to what it saw as the Federalist Party's elitist agenda. Jefferson served two consecutive terms as the first Democratic Republican President of the United States beginning in 1800. James Madison, another Democratic-Republican, succeeded Jefferson in 1808, followed by fellow party member James Monroe in 1812. The national party was briefly divided during the election of John Quincy Adams in 1824, in which four Democratic candidates ran for office. Andrew Jackson assumed the leadership of the party following this period, and reunified its constituents. Jackson defined the party's platform and established the Democratic National Convention as a means of organizing and implementing the party's agenda on a national scale. With consecutive presidential victories in 1828 and 1832, Jackson succeeded in solidifying the Democratic-Republicans as a powerful national political party. The name was simplified to the Democratic Party at the Democratic National Convention of 1844.

Massachusetts was dominated during the early 19th century by the Federalist Party. The Federalist position was strengthened when Maine, a Democratic-Republican stronghold, achieved statehood in 1820. The Democratic Party in Massachusetts was lacking in well-organized structure and strong leadership for much of the post-Jackson 19th century. Individual factions, including rural groups, immigrants, and factory workers, made up the party rank and file, but were unable to organize effectively to compete with first the Whigs and, after the American Civil War period, the Republicans. They rarely gained control over the legislature, and only one governor (William Russell) served more than two consecutive one-year terms.

As the 19th century was ending, the party found a new strength in an old ideal. The Democrats' long-held suspicions of aristocratic leaders and the wealthy elite struck a chord with immigrants and working class citizens during the first half of the 19th century. Irish Americans gained a measure of organizational power in the party beginning late in the 19th century, but it was not until the 1920s that the Irish, along with other immigrant groups and working-class interests, were able to forge a strong party structure that united their interests and consistently produced electable leadership. By the mid-20th century, the party was successfully contending with Republicans for all major state offices, and had by the 1970s achieved its present dominant position in the state legislature.

=== 20th and 21st centuries ===
Despite numerous Republicans elected as governor, the Democratic Party was at the forefront of Massachusetts politics for much of the 20th century. Massachusetts Democrats, from John F. Kennedy to Deval Patrick, have played a prominent role in advancing the party's agenda and prominence on a local and national scale. The state's strength as a Democratic stronghold is such that it has not voted for a Republican for president since 1984, when Ronald Reagan was reelected.

The 2006 elections solidified the Democratic Party's dominance in Massachusetts, when Deval Patrick became the first Democratic governor in 16 years. It was moderated in 2014 with the election of Republican Charlie Baker as governor. Currently, every congressional delegate from Massachusetts is a Democrat. Democrats also occupy all constitutional offices in the Commonwealth's state government which includes governor and lieutenant governor (held by Maura Healey and Kim Driscoll), Attorney General Andrea Campbell, Auditor Diana DiZoglio, Secretary of State William F. Galvin, and Treasurer Deb Goldberg. The party holds super-majorities in both the state House of Representatives and the state Senate.

== Current elected officials ==
=== Members of Congress ===
==== U.S. Senate ====
Democrats have controlled both of Massachusetts's seats in the U.S. Senate since 2012:

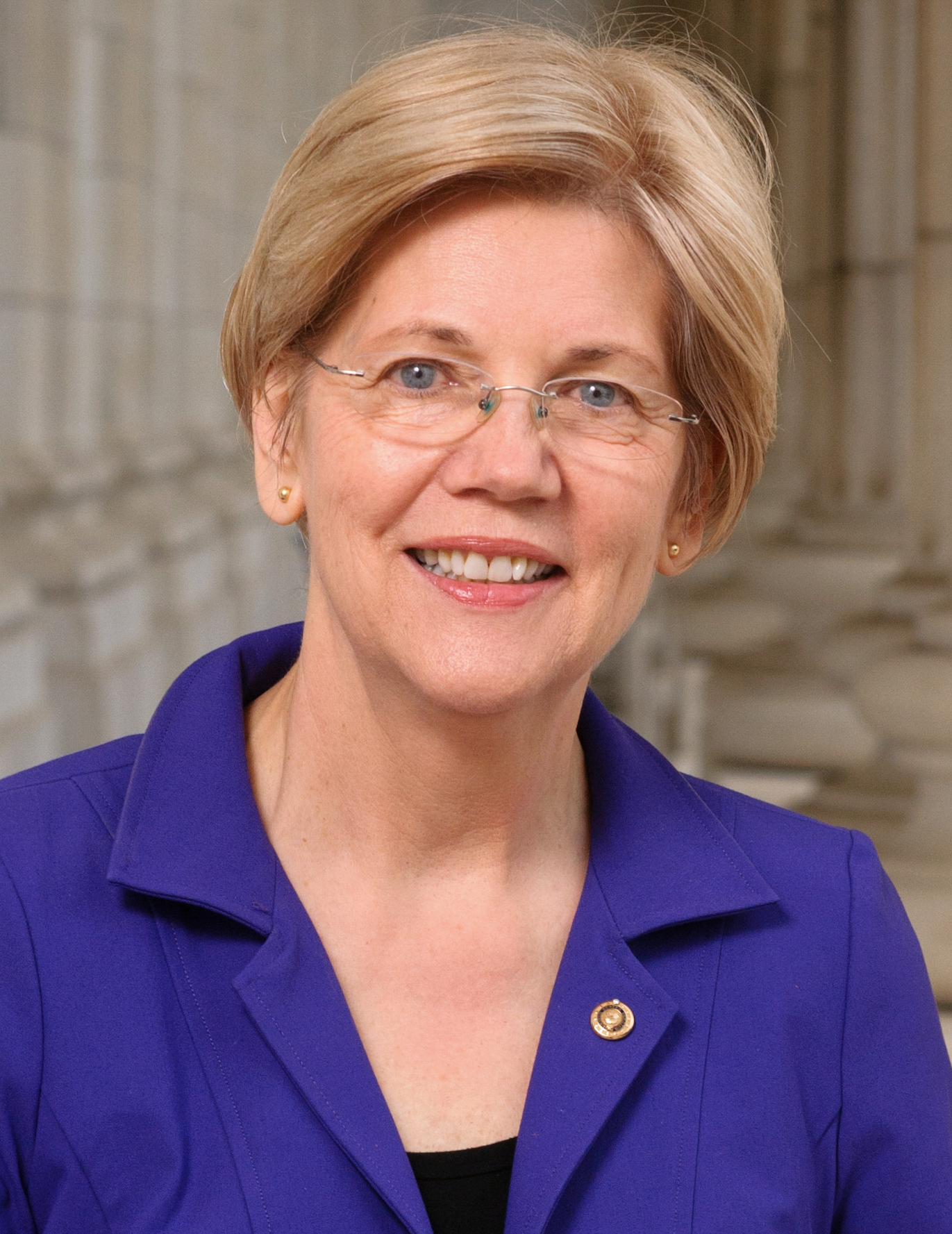
Senior U.S. Senator Elizabeth Warren

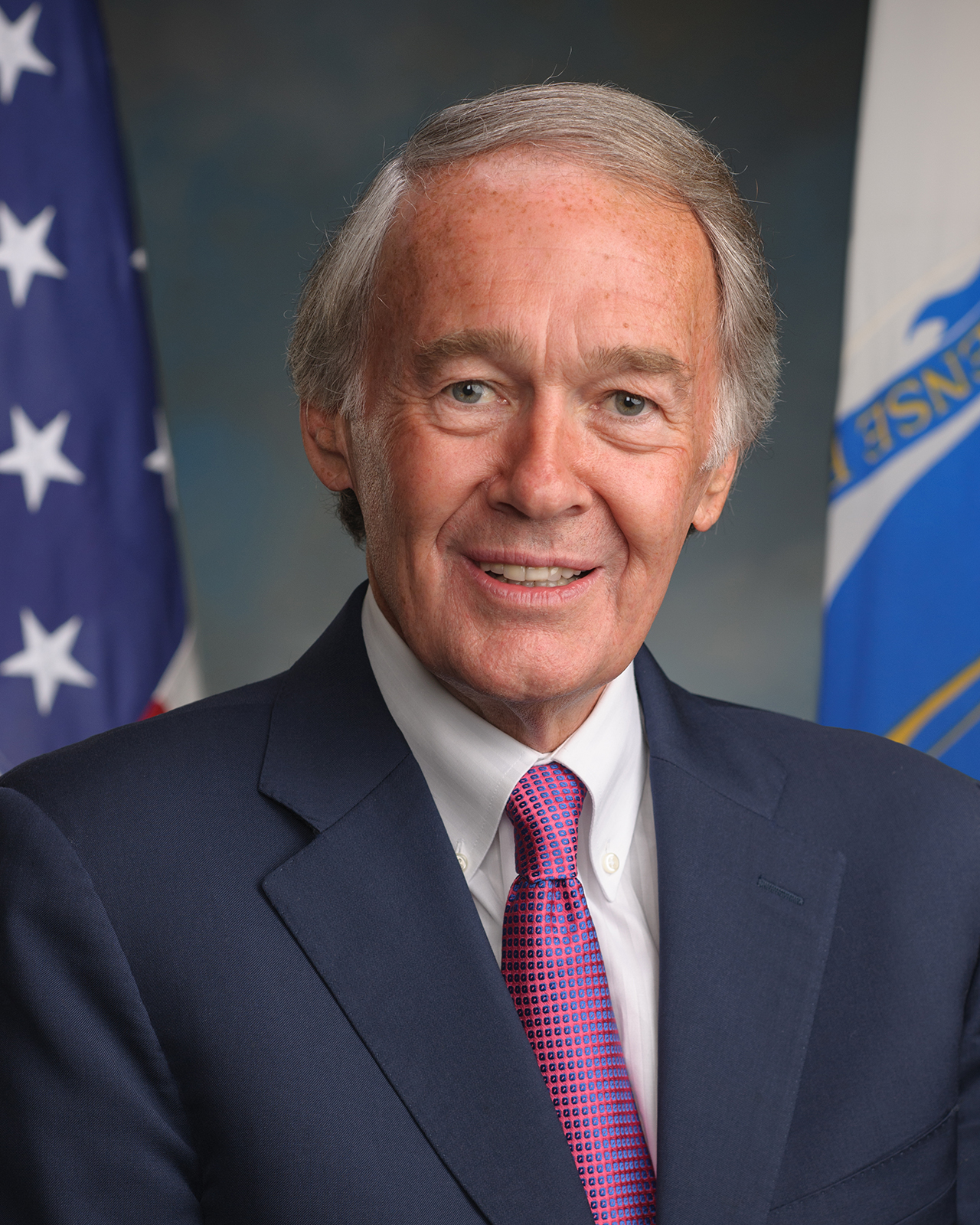
Junior U.S. Senator Ed Markey

==== U.S. House of Representatives ====
Out of the nine seats Massachusetts is apportioned in the U.S. House of Representatives, all nine are held by Democrats:

District	Member	Photo
1st	Richard Neal	
2nd	Jim McGovern	
3rd	Lori Trahan	
4th	Jake Auchincloss	
5th	Katherine Clark (House Majority Leader-designate)	
6th	Seth Moulton	
6th	Dan Koh (elect)	
7th	Ayanna Pressley	
8th	Stephen Lynch	
9th	Bill Keating	

=== Statewide offices ===
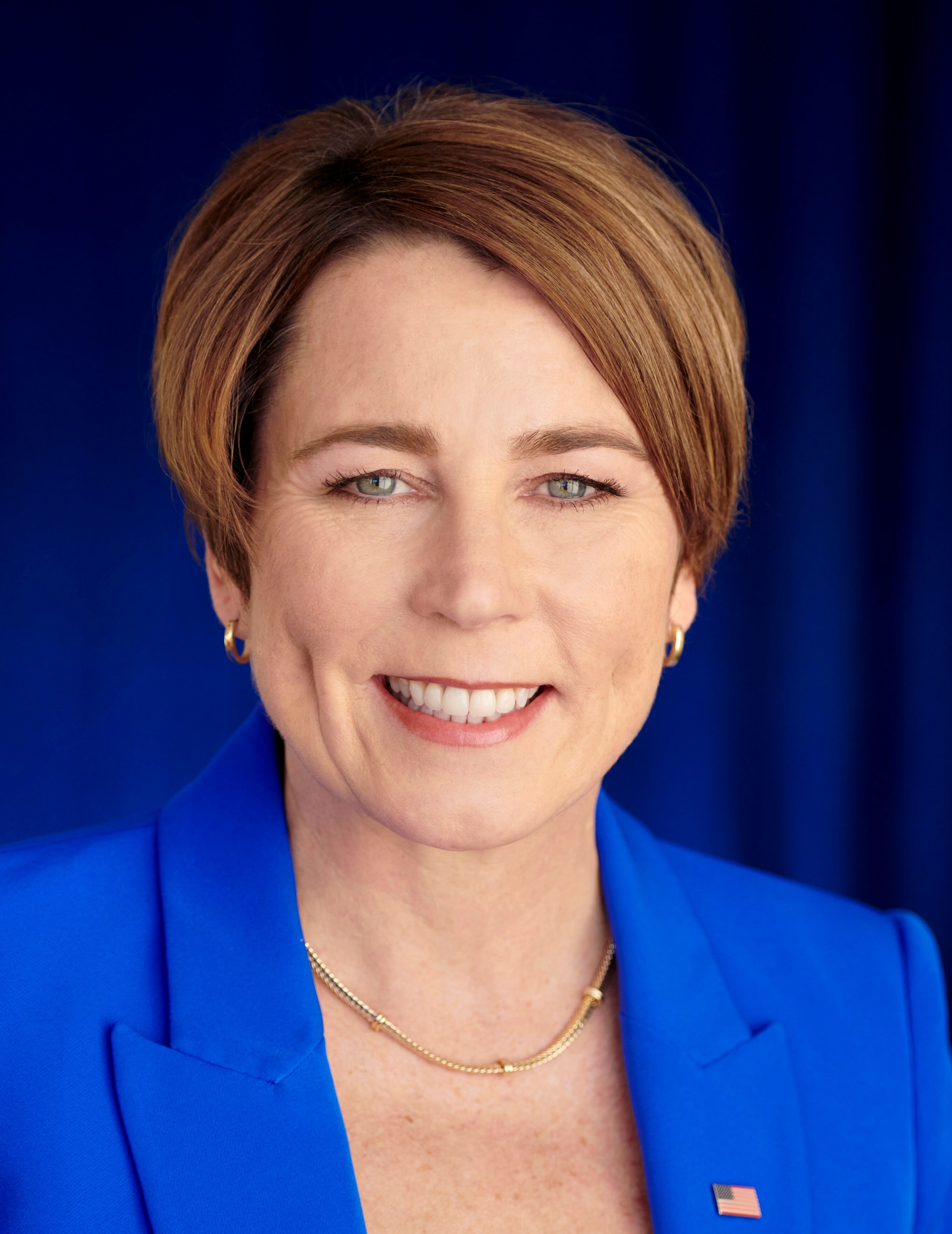
Governor Maura Healey

Democrats control all six of the elected statewide offices:

- Governor: Maura Healey
- Lieutenant Governor: Kim Driscoll
- Secretary of Commonwealth: William F. Galvin
- Attorney General: Andrea Campbell
- Treasurer: Deb Goldberg
- Auditor: Diana DiZoglio

=== State legislature ===
- Senate
  - Current senators
  - Senate President: Karen Spilka (2nd Middlesex and Norfolk)
  - Senate Majority Leader: Cynthia Stone Creem (1st Middlesex and Norfolk)
- House
  - Current representatives
  - House Speaker: Ronald Mariano (3rd Norfolk)
  - House Majority Leader: Michael Moran (18th Suffolk)

=== Mayoral offices ===
As of 2023, Democrats control the mayoralty in nine of the state's ten largest cities.

- Boston (1): Michelle Wu
- Worcester (2): Joseph Petty
- Springfield (3): Domenic Sarno
- Cambridge (4): Sumbul Siddiqui
- Lowell (5): Sokhary Chau
- Brockton (6): Robert F. Sullivan
- New Bedford (8): Jon Mitchell
- Lynn (9): Jared C. Nicholson
- Fall River (10): Paul Coogan

== Past elected officials ==
=== U.S. presidents ===
- John F. Kennedy (1961–63)

=== U.S. senators ===
- Robert Rantoul Jr. (1851)
- David I. Walsh (1919–25, 1926–47)
- Marcus Coolidge (1931–37)
- John F. Kennedy (1953–60)
- Benjamin A. Smith II (1960–62)
- Ted Kennedy (1962–2009)
- Paul Tsongas (1979–85)
- John Kerry (1985–2013)
- Paul G. Kirk (2009–10)
- Mo Cowan (2013)

=== U.S. representatives ===
==== Before 1874 ====
- Francis Baylies of Taunton (1821–27)
- Gayton P. Osgood (1833–35)
- Nathaniel B. Borden of Fall River (1835–39)
- William Parmenter of Cambridge (1837–45)
- Henry Williams (1839–41, 1843–45)
- Robert Rantoul Jr. of Beverly (1851–52)
- Edward P. Little (1852–53)
- Nathaniel P. Banks of Waltham (1853–55) (Note: Banks left the Democratic Party in 1855, but served several nonconsecutive terms in Congress until 1891 as a Know-Nothing and Republican.)

==== 1875–1899 ====
- Chester W. Chapin of Springfield (1875–77)
- John K. Tarbox of Lawrence (1875–77)
- Charles Perkins Thompson of Gloucester (1875–77)
- William Wirt Warren of Boston (1875–77)
- Josiah Gardner Abbott of Boston (1876–77)
- Leopold Morse of Boston (1877–85, 1887–89)
- Benjamin Dean of Boston (1878–79)
- Patrick A. Collins of Boston (1883–89)
- Henry B. Lovering of Lynn (1883–87)
- Edward Burnett of Upton (1887–89)
- John E. Russell of Leicester (1887–89)
- John F. Andrew of Boston (1889–93)
- Joseph H. O'Neil of Boston (1889–95)
- Frederick S. Coolidge of Westminster (1891–93)
- John Crawford Crosby of Pittsfield (1891–93)
- Sherman Hoar of Waltham (1891–93)
- Moses T. Stephens of North Andover (1891–95)
- William Everett of Quincy (1893–95)
- John F. Fitzgerald of Boston (1895–1901, 1919)
- Henry F. Naphen of Boston (1899–1903)
- John R. Thayer of Worcester (1899–1905)

==== 1900–1924 ====
- Joseph A. Conry of Boston (1901–03)
- John A. Keliher of Boston (1903–11)
- William S. McNary of Boston (1903–07)
- John Andrew Sullivan of Boston (1903–07)
- Joseph F. O'Connell of Boston (1907–11)
- Andrew J. Peters of Boston (1907–14)
- Eugene Foss of Jamaica Plain (1910–11)
- John Joseph Mitchell of Marlboro (1910–11, 1913–15)
- James Michael Curley of Boston (1911–14, 1943–47)
- William Francis Murray of Boston (1911–14)
- John A. Thayer of Worcester (1911–13)
- Frederick Simpson Deitrick of Cambridge (1913–15)
- Edward Gilmore of Brockton (1913–15)
- Michael Francis Phelan of Lawrence (1913–21)
- Thomas Chandler Thacher of Yarmouth (1913–15)
- James A. Gallivan of Boston (1914–28)
- Richard Olney II of Dedham (1915–21)
- Peter Francis Tague of Boston (1915–19, 1919–25)
- William P. Connery Jr. of Lynn (1923–37)

==== 1925–1949 ====
- John J. Douglass of Boston (1925–35)
- John W. McCormack of Boston (1928–71)
- William J. Granfield of Springfield (1930–37)
- Arthur D. Healey of Somerville (1933–42)
- Joseph E. Casey of Cambridge (1935–43)
- John P. Higgins of Boston (1935–37)
- Richard M. Russell of Cambridge 1935–37)
- Lawrence J. Connery of Lynn (1937–41)
- Thomas A. Flaherty of Charlestown (1937–43)
- Thomas H. Eliot of Cambridge (1941–43)
- Thomas J. Lane of North Andover (1941–63)
- Philip J. Philbin of Clinton (1943–71)
- Harold Donohue of Worcester (1947–74)
- John F. Kennedy of Cambridge (1947–53)
- Foster Furcolo of Springfield (1949–52)

==== 1950–1974 ====
- Edward Boland of Springfield (1953–89)
- Tip O'Neill of Cambridge (1953–87)
- Torbert H. Macdonald of Malden (1955–76)
- James A. Burke of Milton (1959–79)
- Michael J. Harrington of Salem (1969–79)
- Rev. Robert Drinan of Newton (1971–81)
- Louise Day Hicks of South Boston (1971–73)
- John J. Moakley of Boston (1973–2001)
- Gerry Studds of Cohasset (1973–97)

==== 1975–1999 ====
- Joseph D. Early of Worcester (1975–93)
- Paul Tsongas of Lowell (1975–79)
- Ed Markey of Malden (1976–2013)
- Brian J. Donnelly of Dorchester (1979–93)
- Nicholas Mavroules of Peabody (1979–93)
- James Shannon of Lowell (1979–85)
- Barney Frank of Newton (1981–2013)
- Chester G. Atkins of Concord (1985–93)
- Joseph P. Kennedy II of Boston (1987–99)
- John Olver of Amherst (1991–2013)
- Marty Meehan of Lowell (1993–2007)
- William Delahunt of Quincy (1997–2011)
- John F. Tierney of Salem (1997–2015)
- Mike Capuano of Somerville (1999–2019)
- Niki Tsongas of Lowell (2007–2019)

=== Governors ===
- Marcus Morton (1840–41, 1843–44)
- George S. Boutwell (1851–53)
- William Gaston (1875–76)
- Benjamin F. Butler (1883–84)
- William F. Russell (1891–94)
- William L. Douglas (1905–06)
- Eugene Noble Foss (1911–14)
- David I. Walsh (1914–16)
- Joseph B. Ely (1931–35)
- James Michael Curley (1935–37)
- Charles F. Hurley (1937–39)
- Maurice J. Tobin (1945–47)
- Paul A. Dever (1949–53)
- Foster Furcolo (1957–61)
- Endicott Peabody (1963–65)
- Michael Dukakis (1975–79, 1983–91)
- Edward J. King (1979–83)
- Deval Patrick (2007–15)
- Maura Healey (2023–present)

=== State legislature ===
==== Speakers of the House ====
- Nathaniel P. Banks (1851–1852)
- Tip O'Neill (1949–1952)
- Michael F. Skerry (1955–1957)
- John F. Thompson (1958–1964)
- John Davoren (1964–1967)
- Robert H. Quinn (1967–1969)
- David M. Bartley (1969–1975)
- Thomas W. McGee (1975–1984)
- George Keverian (1985–1991)
- Charles Flaherty (1991–1996)
- Thomas Finneran (1996–2004)
- Salvatore DiMasi (2004–2009)
- Robert DeLeo (2009–2020)
- Ronald Mariano (2020–present)

==== President of the Senate ====
- Phineas W. Leland (1843)
- Frederick Robinson (1843)
- Chester A. Dolan Jr. (1949)
- John E. Powers (1959–1964)
- Maurice A. Donahue (1964–1971)
- Kevin B. Harrington (1971–1978)
- William Bulger (1978–1996)
- Tom Birmingham (1996–2003)
- Robert Travaglini (2003–2007)
- Therese Murray (2007–2015)
- Stan Rosenberg (2015–2017)
- Harriette L. Chandler (2017–2018)
- Karen Spilka (2018–present)

=== Other statewide offices ===
==== Attorney General ====
- Thomas J. Boynton (1914–15)
- Paul A. Dever (1935–41)
- Francis E. Kelly (1949–53)
- Edward J. McCormack Jr. (1958–63)
- Robert H. Quinn (1969–75)
- Francis X. Bellotti (1975–87)
- James Shannon (1987–91)
- Scott Harshbarger (1991–99)
- Thomas Reilly (1999–2007)
- Martha Coakley (2007–15)
- Maura Healey (2015–23)
- Andrea Campbell (2023–present)

==== Treasurer ====
- Frederick Mansfield (1914–15)
- Charles F. Hurley (1931–37)
- Francis X. Hurley (1943–45)
- John E. Hurley (1945–47, 1949–52)
- Foster Furcolo (1952–55)
- John Francis Kennedy (1955–61)
- John T. Driscoll (1961–64)
- Robert Q. Crane (1964–91)
- Shannon O'Brien (1999–2003)
- Tim Cahill (2003–09) (Note: Cahill left the Democratic Party in 2009, but remained Treasurer until 2011.)
- Steve Grossman (2011–15)
- Deb Goldberg (2015–present)

==== Secretary of the Commonwealth ====
- Frank J. Donahue (1913–15)
- Edward J. Cronin (1949–58)
- Joseph D. Ward (1959–61)
- Kevin H. White (1961–67)
- John Davoren (1967–74)
- Paul H. Guzzi (1975–78)
- Michael J. Connolly (1979–94)
- William F. Galvin (1995–present)

==== Auditor ====
- William D. T. Trefry (1891–92)
- Frank H. Pope (1914–15)
- Francis X. Hurley (1931–35)
- Thomas H. Buckley (1935–39)
- Thomas J. Buckley (1941–64)
- Thaddeus M. Buczko (1964–81)
- John J. Finnegan (1981–87)
- A. Joseph DeNucci (1987–2011)
- Suzanne Bump (2011–23)
- Diana DiZoglio (2023–present)

== List of party chairpersons ==
- George S. Boutwell (1853)
- Noah A. Plympton (1883–1884)
- Patrick Collins (1884–1891)
- John W. Corcoran (1891)
- Josiah Quincy (1891–1894)
- John W. Corcoran (1894–1896)
- John W. Coughlin (1896–1898)
- Christopher T. Callahan (1898–1901)
- William S. McNary (1901–1904)
- John Flaherty (1904–1905)
- Josiah Quincy (1905–1906)
- John P. Feeney (1906–1908)
- James W. Synan (1908–1909)
- John F. McDonald (1909–1912)
- Thomas P. Riley (1912–1914)
- Michael A. O'Leary (1914–1921)
- Arthur Lyman (1921–1923)
- Charles H. McGlue (1923–1928)
- Frank J. Donahue (1928–1932)
- Charles F. Riordon – Acting (1932)
- Joseph A. Maynard (1932–1934)
- Helen McGillicuddy – Acting (1934)
- Charles H. McGlue (1934–1935)
- Joseph McGrath (1935–1939)
- William H. Burke, Jr. (1939–1944)
- John F. Cahill (1944–1948)
- John T. McMorrow (1948)
- William Brophy – Acting (1948–1949)
- James H. Vahey Jr. (1949)
- Edward P. Gilgun – Acting (1949)
- John C. Carr (1949–1956)
- William H. Burke, Jr. (1956)
- John M. "Pat" Lynch (1956–1962)
- Gerard F. Doherty (1962–1967)
- Lester Hyman (1967–1968)
- David E. Harrison (1968–1971)
- Robert Q. Crane (1971)
- Charles Flaherty (1971–1977)
- Chester G. Atkins (1977–1991)
- Steve Grossman (1991–1993)
- Joan Menard (1993–2000)
- Philip W. Johnston (2000–2007)
- John E. Walsh (2007–2013)
- Thomas McGee (2013–2016)
- Gus Bickford (2016–2023)
- Steve Kerrigan (2023–present)

== Election results ==
=== State ===
==== Executive offices ====
Governor
Election	Candidate/ticket	Votes	%	Result
1964	Francis Bellotti	1,153,416	49.29%	Lost ✗
1966	Edward J. McCormack Jr.	752,720	36.88%	Lost ✗
1970	Kevin White/Michael Dukakis	799,269	42.79%	Lost ✗
1974	Michael Dukakis/Thomas P. O'Neill III	992,284	53.50%	Won ✓
1978	Edward J. King/Thomas P. O'Neill III	1,030,294	52.51%	Won ✓
1982	Michael Dukakis/John Kerry	1,219,109	59.48%	Won ✓
1986	Michael Dukakis/Evelyn Murphy	1,157,786	68.79%	Won ✓
1990	John Silber/Marjorie Clapprood	1,099,878	46.94%	Lost ✗
1994	Mark Roosevelt/Bob Massie	611,650	28.27%	Lost ✗
1998	Scott Harshbarger/Warren Tolman	901,843	47.44%	Lost ✗
2002	Shannon O'Brien/Chris Gabrieli	985,981	44.40%	Lost ✗
2006	Deval Patrick/Tim Murray	1,234,984	55.03%	Won ✓
2010	Deval Patrick/Tim Murray	1,112,283	48.42%	Won ✓
2014	Martha Coakley/Steve Kerrigan	1,004,408	46.54%	Lost ✗
2018	Jay Gonzalez/Quentin Palfrey	885,770	33.12%	Lost ✗
2022	Maura Healey/Kim Driscoll	1,584,403	63.74%	Won ✓
2026	Maura Healey/Kim Driscoll	1,628,936	61.99%	Won ✓

== See also ==
- Massachusetts Republican Party
- Political party strength in Massachusetts
- 2020 Massachusetts general election
