= Alan Sisitsky =

American politician

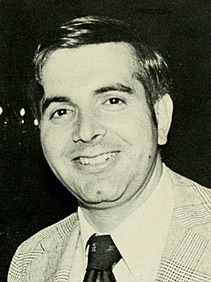
- Alan Sisitsky, circa 1975

Member of the Massachusetts Senate
- In office 1973–1983
- Preceded by: George D. Hammond
- Succeeded by: Linda Melconian

Member of Massachusetts House of Representatives from the 7th Hampden District
- In office 1969–1973
- Preceded by: Philip Kimball
- Succeeded by: Iris Holland

Personal details
- Born: June 4, 1942 Springfield, Massachusetts, U.S.
- Died: July 7, 2017 (aged 75) Longmeadow, Massachusetts, U.S.
- Resting place: City of Homes Cemetery
- Party: Democratic
- Education: Cornell University (BA); Harvard University (MA); Yale University (LLB)
- Occupation: Lawyer

Alan David Sisitsky (June 4, 1942 – July 7, 2017) was an American lawyer and politician who served in the Massachusetts House of Representatives and the Massachusetts Senate.

== Early life and education ==
Sisitsky was born on June 4, 1942, in Springfield, Massachusetts. He attended Springfield public schools and went on to graduate from Cornell University with a Bachelor of Arts in government, Harvard University with a Master of Arts in political science, and Yale Law School with a Bachelor of Laws. He was on the staff of The Cornell Daily Sun and a member of the Quill and Dagger society at Cornell, and editor of the Yale Law Journal. Prior to entering politics, Sisitsky served in the United States Army and worked for the Boston law firm of Choate, Hall & Stewart.

== Political career ==
Sisitsky was inspired to enter politics by John F. Kennedy. In 1968 he ran against incumbent Republican Philip Kimball in the Massachusetts House of Representatives' 7th Hampden District. He defeated Kimball by 139 votes. In 1972 he defeated incumbent George D. Hammond to become the State Senator for the Hampden and Berkshire District.

=== Insurance ===
Sisitsky was considered an expert on auto insurance. He was credited with creating the state Auto Insurance Rating Bureau and having auto insurance companies return $35 million in excess profits to Massachusetts drivers. He also sponsored legislation to compel insurance companies to include investment income in their calculations when making annual rate-increase requests and helped pass legislation to provide protective regulation for elderly people purchasing health insurance policies and prevent the arbitrary cancellation of homeowners insurance. When William M. Bulger became Senate President in 1978, he appointed Sisitsky to the Insurance Committee.

=== Judiciary Committee ===
In 1976 he was appointed the Senate's Chairman of the Legislature's Joint Committee on the Judiciary by Senate President Kevin B. Harrington. As co-chairman, Sisitsky played a major role in the effort to reform the Massachusetts court system. In 1977, Sisitsky's bill, which contained many of the proposals submitted by the Cox Committee (chaired by Harvard professor Archibald Cox) a year earlier, passed the Senate 31 to 6. The House also passed a court reform bill and a compromise bill was constructed. The compromise bill died on the Senate floor at the end of the 1977 legislative session. In 1978, the committee recommended the removal of Robert M. Bonin as Chief Justice of the Massachusetts Superior Court after Bonin was censured and suspended by the Supreme Judicial Court for improprieties involving the hiring of secretaries and attending a benefit for defendants awaiting trial in Superior Court. Sisitsky, however, disagreed with the committee's recommendation and delivered an impassioned speech in defense of Bonin. Bonin later resigned, stating that his removal was 'inevitable'.

=== Legislation ===
During his tenure in the Massachusetts legislature, Sisitsky sponsored legislation to establish the Hampden Housing Court, implement the Equal Rights Amendment, reorganize and strengthen the Massachusetts Commission Against Discrimination, tighten the open meeting law, and provide a right to counsel during grand jury proceedings. He also helped pass an anti-rape statute, a rape shield law, displaced homemaker legislation, and legislation requiring banks to pay interest on tax escrow accounts.

=== Relationship with Michael Dukakis ===
Sisitsky was initially a supporter of Governor Michael Dukakis. He raised money and campaigned for Dukakis during his 1970 run for Lieutenant Governor of Massachusetts and ran his campaign in Western Massachusetts during the 1974 gubernatorial election. However, Sisitsky broke with Dukakis soon after he became governor. Sisitsky faulted Dukakis for cutting spending on human services and for "doing very little" to promote court reform. It was also reported that Sisitsky was upset with Dukakis for not appointing him to his cabinet. Sisitsky considered running against Dukakis for the Democratic nomination for governor in 1978, but instead decided to run for reelection to his Senate seat. He was also mentioned as a possible candidate for Lieutenant Governor of Massachusetts if Democratic incumbent Thomas P. O'Neill III decided to challenge Edward Brooke in the 1978 senate election, however O'Neill chose to run for reelection instead.

=== Opposition to Proposition 2½ ===
One day after Proposition 2½ was passed by voters through an initiative petition, Sisitsky announced that he would file a bill to repeal it. His repeal efforts resulted a vitriolic reaction from the public. He received over 200 phone calls from supporters of Proposition 2½, which he said included death threats and anti-semitic slurs. Although he continued to oppose the law, Sisitsky later chose to drop his repeal efforts, stating that repeal would "flout the referendum vote".

=== Feud with Matthew Ryan ===
On May 20, 1981, Sisitsky asked the Massachusetts Supreme Judicial Court to investigate Hampden County District Attorney Matthew J. Ryan. He accused Ryan of abusing his office by using the indictment process for "intimidation", protecting mobsters, and protecting a close friend who was charged with shooting at two police officers. Chief Justice Edward F. Hennessey advised Sisitsky to take his case to Massachusetts Attorney General Francis X. Bellotti, whose office reviewed the charges.

During his tenure in the Massachusetts Legislature, Sisitsky sponsored successful legislation that reduced the size of Ryan's district by creating a separate district attorney's office for Berkshire County and barred district attorneys from private practice, which cost Ryan about $100,000 per year.

Ryan's supporters, including Assistant District Attorney Guy Peznola, claimed that Sisitsky bore a grudge over Ryan's prosecution of Sisitsky's father in 1960. Sisitsky said that he had forgotten about his father's case long ago.

Initially, nothing came of Sisitsky's charges. However, in 1990 it was announced that the United States Attorney's office and the Massachusetts Attorney General's office were jointly investigating Ryan.

=== Feud with Bulger, resignation, and removal ===
In 1981, Sisitsky clashed with Senate President William M. Bulger over the autonomy of the Springfield and Boston Housing Courts, which had been placed under the Boston Municipal Court as part of the 1982 Budget. Sisitsky felt that these courts had been downgraded because the chief judge did not appoint a friend of Bulger's to the position of assistant clerk.

On July 14, 1981, Sisitsky announced that he would resign from the Senate effective September 1. He cited the actions of Bulger and Senate Ways and Means Committee Chairman Chester G. Atkins as his reason for resigning. He blamed Bulger and Atkins for stalling for two weeks before approving an emergency spending bill. Sisitsky's decision to resign was met with skepticism from fellow Senators, who believed that Sisitsky would not resign. On July 30, Bulger replaced Sisitsky as Judiciary Committee Chairman. On August 18, Sisitsky announced that he had changed his mind and would finish out his term. He listed a number of reasons for his change of mind, including an overwhelming response from the public urging him to stay, the cost of a special election, and his desire to attempt to reform the Senate. He also announced that he would run for statewide office in 1982, but did not state which office he would run for, and that in addition to his Senatorial duties, he would work part-time as a teacher at Puget Sound Law School in Tacoma, Washington.

During his feud with Bulger, Sisitsky's behavior in the chamber became disruptive. Boston Globe columnist Norman Lockman described the atmosphere of the Senate as being "poisoned" by his "festering hate for the place". He also described the Senate as running on "Sisitsky-time". Due to Sisitsky's frequent rants and attacks on Bulger, the Senate dragged on while Sisitsky spoke and feverishly rushed to pass legislation when Sisitsky's was tired out or when he was away teaching at Puget Sound Law School.

On October 27, 1981, Sisitsky made a motion to remove Bulger as Senate President. Bulger ruled the motion out of order, which caused Sisitsky to shout "that is the worst ruling made in my 14 years here. It's outrageous" and state that he would make a motion to remove Bulger every day. Bulger ruled Sisitsky out of order because he did not seek permission from the chair before speaking. Later, Sisitsky interrupted another Senator while he was speaking on a bill and, while the Senate was debating a bill reported out of the Banks and Banking Committee, Sisitsky said that the committee should be disbanded and instead a rubber stamp should be given to the cleaning lady. He also accused committee chair John A. Brennan, Jr. of being "co-opted by the bankers". After the attack on Brennan, Bulger named Sisitsky, a disciplinary action that resulted in Sisitsky's ejection from the Senate Chamber and prevented him from returning until the Senate voted to reinstate him. It was the first time in the 201-year history of the Senate that such an action had been taken. Sisitsky was escorted out of the chamber by a court officer. On his way out, Sisitsky exclaimed "Being thrown out of this Senate is like being thrown out of a brothel" and "to leave this chamber is an honor. I thank you for the honor".

On November 2, 1981, the Senate Ethics Committee recommended that Sisitsky be reinstated only if he issued a formal apology to the Senate. That same day, attorneys for Sisitsky filed suit in the Supreme Judicial Court seeking to overturn his removal. On November 9, the Court refused to issue an injunction to reinstate Sisitsky. On November 16, Sisitsky issued an apology and was reinstated.

Sisitsky's attacks on William Bulger upset Bulger's brother, mobster Whitey Bulger. Whitey Bulger had his associate Kevin Weeks call Sisitsky and threaten to kill him.

=== Mental health issues ===
During his final term in the Senate, Sisitsky's behavior was described as eccentric and erratic. He spent hours making calls to reporters and news organizations, sometimes into the early morning. During the 1981 Senate budget debate, Sisitsky walked around the Senate chamber for 20 hours, talked loudly, challenged rulings, and proposed amendments that received little or no support. At one point he sat in another senator's chair and refused to move. He also tore up a newspaper and then tried to piece it back together so he could finish an article that angered him. Senator Sharon Pollard twice changed her seat to avoid Sisitsky's loud talking. Senate Minority Leader John F. Parker described Sisitsky as having "carried on in a frightful way" and went on to say "I think his wheels are coming off".

During a flight from Boston to Seattle, he was removed by airline security guards for erratic behavior.

On January 29, 1982, Sisitsky attempted to deliver a battered bouquet of roses to Governor Edward J. King. After an encounter with the Capitol Police, Sisitsky was taken by ambulance from the State House to McLean Hospital, a psychiatric hospital in Belmont, Massachusetts. He received no medical treatment and left the hospital after a few hours.

In February 1982, Sisitsky was described as being preoccupied with a conspiracy by legislative leaders to "get him", roaming the halls of the State House unshaven and in wrinkled or dirty clothes, and making short, bizarre statements to anyone who came within a few feet of him. He claimed that the conspiracy against him was fueled by anti-Semitism. He said that he had been beaten by police, called names, had swastikas painted on the door of his State House office, and received death threats from a number of people, including state officials and Libyan leader Muammar Gaddafi. None of his claims could be corroborated. He reportedly no longer had any staffers, which he said was because "their lives have been threatened".

During the first formal session of 1982, Sisitsky spent the session shouting "Mr. President, Mr. President" in a rapid-fire fashion in an attempt to be recognized. Bulger ignored Sisitsky. After the session, Bulger announced that he would appoint a special bipartisan committee to advise him on how to deal with Sisitsky's disruptive behavior and to examine Sisitsky's fitness to serve as a Senator. He described Sisitsky's disruptions as having no rational purpose and "bizarre".

On February 26, 1982, Sisitsky's brother, aide, and a third person, filed a petition for commitment in Dedham District Court. The next day, Sisitsky's family announced that he had been hospitalized for "physical and emotional fatigue". He was sent to Westwood Lodge Hospital, a psychiatric hospital in Westwood, Massachusetts.

Sisitsky returned to the Senate on June 2, 1982, three weeks after being released from the hospital. He did not seek reelection in 1982.

== Post-legislative career ==
After leaving the Senate, Sisitsky practiced law in Springfield. In 1988 he was elected to Democratic State Committee in the 1st Hampden District. He was reelected in 1992.

== Death ==
Sisitsky died on July 7, 2017, at the Jewish Nursing Home in Longmeadow, Massachusetts.

== See also ==
- Massachusetts Senate's 2nd Hampden and Hampshire district

Political offices
Preceded by John Conte	Senate Chairman of the Massachusetts General Court's Joint Committee on the Judiciary; 1976–1981	Succeeded by Michael LoPresi
