= William I. Cowin =

American jurist (1938–2022)

Associate Justice of the Massachusetts Appeals Court
- In office 2001–2008
- Nominated by: Paul Cellucci
- Preceded by: Seat created
- Succeeded by: James Milkey

Massachusetts Secretary of Administration and Finance
- In office 1972–1974
- Preceded by: Robert Yasi
- Succeeded by: David Marchand

Massachusetts Secretary of Consumer Affairs
- In office 1971–1972
- Preceded by: Position created
- Succeeded by: John R. Verani

Chair of the Massachusetts Department of Public Utilities
- In office 1969–1971
- Preceded by: Helen P. Ross
- Succeeded by: John R. Verani

Personal details
- Born: William Irvin Cowin; April 28, 1938
- Died: August 9, 2022 (aged 84)
- Party: Republican
- Spouse: Judith Cowin
- Education: Harvard College; Harvard Law School
- Profession: Attorney

William Irvin Cowin (April 28, 1938 – August 9, 2022) was an American jurist, politician, and state cabinet secretary who served as Massachusetts Secretary of Consumer Affairs from 1971 to 1972 and Massachusetts Secretary of Administration and Finance from 1972 to 1974. He was a candidate for State Attorney General in 1974 and Lieutenant Governor of Massachusetts in 1978.

== Early career ==
Cowin graduated from Harvard College in 1959 and Harvard Law School in 1962. From 1963 to 1966 he was an Assistant Massachusetts Attorney General. When Attorney General Edward Brooke was elected to the United States Senate, Cowin joined him as a legislative assistant. He returned to Massachusetts in 1968 as special counsel to Mayor of Boston Kevin White.

In 1969 he was named Chairman of the State Public Utilities Commission by Governor Francis W. Sargent.

== State cabinet secretary ==
In 1971, Cowin was appointed Massachusetts Secretary of Consumer Affairs. After Secretary of Administration and Finance Robert Yasi was appointed a judge in the Suffolk Probate Court, Cowin was chosen to succeed him. As Administration and Finance Secretary Cowin was in charge of outlining the state budget.

== 1974 Attorney General campaign ==
Cowin resigned from Sargent's cabinet on May 9, 1974 to run for State Attorney General. He officially entered the race four days later. He won the convention endorsement after his two Republican opponents, Josiah Spaulding and Charles Codman Cabot, Jr., chose to bypass the convention. During the campaign, Cowin struggled to raise money and trailed Spaulding in polls.

Cowin finished third in the Republican primary with 24% of the vote.

After the primary, Governor Sargent asked for state Republican chairman William Barnstead's resignation and recommended that Cowin succeed him. Sargent later postponed his efforts to remove Barnstead to focus on his race against Michael Dukakis.

In 1975, Cowin became a partner at Friedman & Atherton, LLP.

== 1978 Lieutenant Governor campaign ==
On May 25, 1978, Cowin and gubernatorial candidate Francis W. Hatch, Jr. announced Cowin's candidacy for lieutenant governor as Hatch's running mate.

On September 19, 1978 he defeated State Representative Peter McDowell in the Republican Primary 128,914 votes to 86,250.

On November 7, 1978, Hatch and Cowin lost the general election to Edward J. King and Thomas P. O'Neill III 53% to 47%.

== Later career ==
From 2001 to 2008, Cowin was an associate justice of the Massachusetts Appeals Court.

== Personal life ==
Cowin was married to retired Massachusetts Supreme Judicial Court Justice Judith Cowin. They have three grown children.

Party political offices
Preceded by Donald Dwight	Republican nominee for Lieutenant Governor of Massachusetts; 1978	Succeeded by Leon Lombardi
