= Jack Buckley =

Jack Buckley may refer to:

- Jack Buckley (English footballer) (1903–1985), English footballer
- Jack Buckley (footballer, born 1907) (1907–1980), Australian rules footballer for Fitzroy
- Jack Buckley (footballer, born 1997), Australian rules footballer for Greater Western Sydney
- John R. Buckley (1932–2020), American politician

== See also ==
- John Buckley (disambiguation)
