= Byron J. Matthews =

American politician (1928–2023)

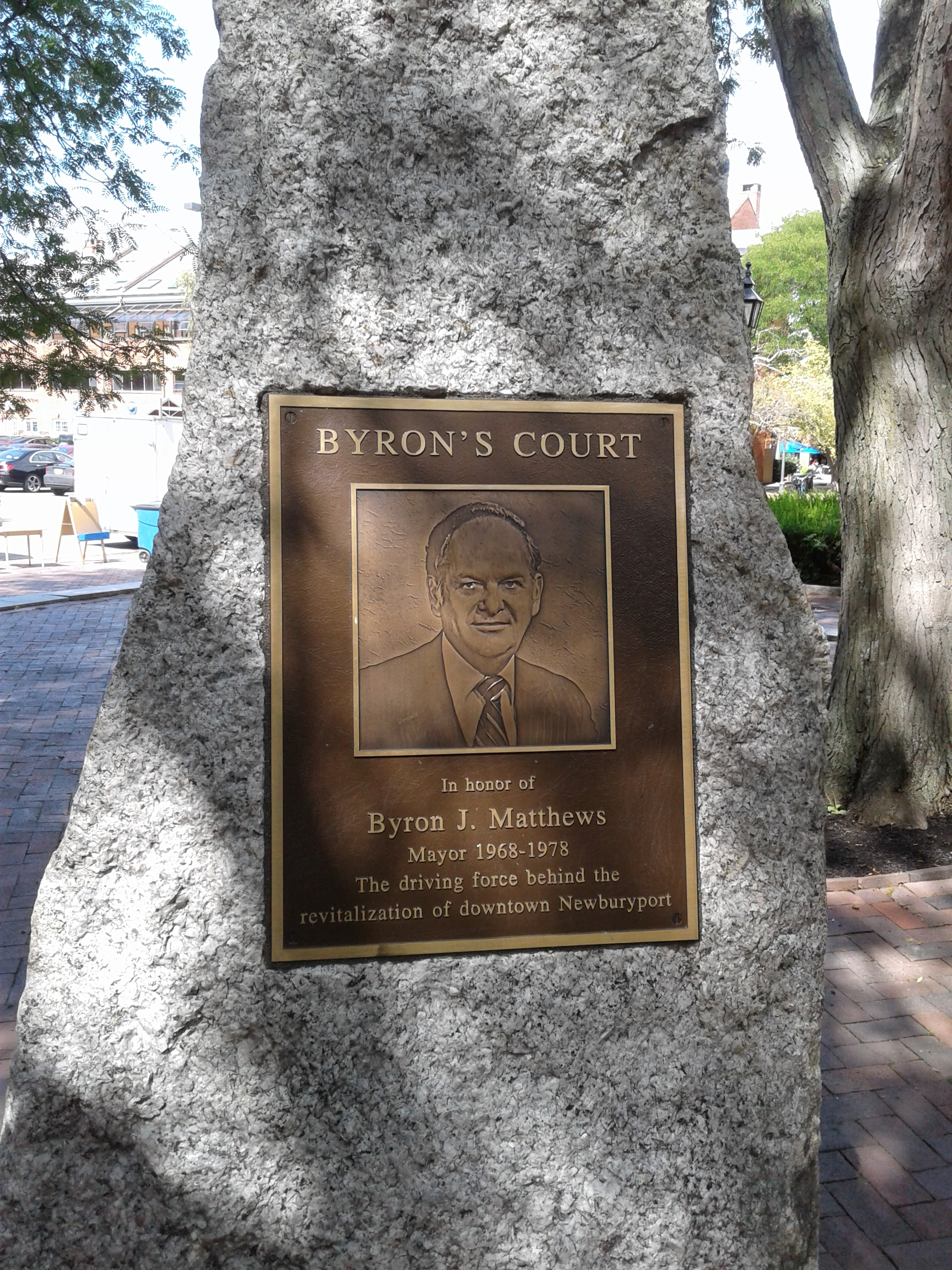

Massachusetts Secretary of Communities and Development
- In office 1979–1983
- Preceded by: William G. Flynn
- Succeeded by: Amy S. Anthony

Mayor of Newburyport, Massachusetts
- In office 1968–1978
- Preceded by: George H. Lawler, Jr.
- Succeeded by: Richard E. Sullivan

Personal details
- Born: August 30, 1928 Newburyport, Massachusetts, United States
- Died: March 25, 2023 (aged 94)
- Party: Republican

Byron J. Matthews (August 30, 1928 – March 25, 2023) was an American politician who served as Mayor of Newburyport, Massachusetts from 1968 to 1978 and Massachusetts Secretary of Communities and Development from 1979 to 1983.

Matthews entered politics in 1962 when he was elected to the Newburyport City Council. He was elected mayor in 1968 and served an unprecedented five terms. During his tenure as mayor, Matthews oversaw much of the restoration of downtown Newburyport.

In addition to serving as mayor, Matthews also worked for Massachusetts Governor Francis W. Sargent as an advisor and campaign coordinator.

From 1979 to 1983, Matthews served as Governor Edward J. King's Secretary of Communities and Development.

In 1983 he was a candidate in the special election to fill the Third Essex District seat in the Massachusetts Senate vacated by Sharon Pollard. He lost to Democrat Nicholas J. Costello by 320 votes.

In 1995, Matthews unsuccessfully challenged incumbent Lisa L. Mead in the Newburyport mayoral election.

From 1996-2007 he was Chairman of Northern Essex Community College.

Matthews' cousin, Peter J. Matthews, also served as Newburyport's mayor from 1985 to 1987, and again from 1990 to 1993.
