= John Buckley =

John Buckley may refer to:

== Politicians ==
- John Buckley (Canadian politician) (1863–1942), member of the Legislative Assembly of Alberta, 1921–1935
- John Buckley (attorney) (1885–1959), Connecticut politician
- John Buckley (Virginia politician) (born 1953), Virginia politician
- John Francis Buckley (1891–1931), barrister, soldier, and Canadian federal politician
- John F. Buckley (1892–1965), Wisconsin politician
- John J. Buckley (mayor) (1915–1997), Massachusetts politician, mayor of Lawrence, Massachusetts
- John J. Buckley (sheriff) (1929–1994), sheriff of Middlesex County, Massachusetts
- John L. Buckley (1900–after 1948), New York politician
- John R. Buckley (1932–2020), Massachusetts politician

== Sportspeople ==
- John Buckley (baseball) (1869–1942), American baseball pitcher
- John Buckley (cricketer) (born 1956), South African cricketer
- John Buckley (footballer, born 1962), Scottish football manager and former professional footballer
- John Buckley (footballer, born 1999), English footballer
- Jack Buckley (English footballer) (John William Buckley, 1903–1985), English footballer
- John Buckley (Aghabullogue hurler) (1863–1935), Irish hurler for Cork and Aghabullogue
- John Buckley (Newtownshandrum hurler) (born 1953), Irish hurler for Cork, Avondhu and Newtownshandrum
- John Buckley (Glen Rovers hurler) (born 1958), Irish hurler for Cork and Glen Rovers
- Johnny Buckley (boxing manager) (died 1963), American boxing manager and promoter
- Johnny Buckley (Gaelic footballer) (born 1989), Gaelic footballer for Kerry

== Other ==
- John Buckley, Australian artist, director of Institute of Modern Art 1976–79
- John Buckley (martyr) (died 1598), English religious leader and martyr
- John Buckley (bishop) (born 1939), Irish Catholic religious leader
- John Buckley (composer) (born 1951), Irish composer
- John Buckley (historian) (born 1967), professor of military history at the University of Wolverhampton
- John Buckley (sculptor) (born 1945), English sculptor
- John Buckley (VC) (1813–1876), British Victoria Cross recipient
- John C. Buckley (1842–1913), American Civil War soldier and Medal of Honor recipient

== See also ==
- Jack Buckley (disambiguation)
