= Marty Linsky =

American politician

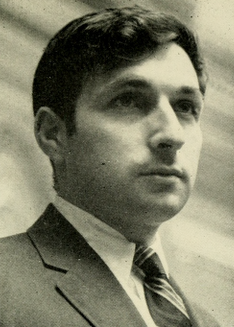

Member of the Massachusetts House of Representatives from the 13th Norfolk district
- In office 1967–1973
- Preceded by: Freyda Koplow
- Succeeded by: James Siegel

Personal details
- Born: August 28, 1940 (age 86) Boston, Massachusetts, U.S.
- Party: Republican
- Education: Williams College (BA); Harvard University (JD)
- Occupation: Attorney; Legislator; Professor

Martin A. Linsky (born August 28, 1940) is a professor at the Harvard University Kennedy School of Government and a co-founder with Ronald A. Heifetz of Cambridge Leadership Associates. He served as Chief Secretary/Counselor to Massachusetts Governor William Weld from 1992 to 1995 and has published extensively on leadership, management, politics, and education.

== Career ==
He graduated from Williams College and Harvard Law School, and served as an assistant state attorney general and was the state representative from Brookline, Massachusetts from 1969 to 1973.

Linsky was Francis Sargent's choice for Lieutenant Governor in 1970, however two weeks before the Republican convention, Linsky dropped out of the race after it was revealed that police officers had once stopped his car and informed him that the woman was traveling with was a prostitute.

In 1972, Linsky was the Republican nominee for the United States House of Representatives seat in Massachusetts's 4th congressional district, but lost to incumbent Robert Drinan.

== Personal life ==
He is Jewish.

== Publications ==
- Heifetz, Ronald A., Alexander Grashow, and Marty Linsky. The Practice of Adaptive Leadership: Tools and Tactics for Changing Your Organization and the World. Harvard Business Review Press, 2009.
- Bronznick, Shifra, Didi Goldenhar, Marty Linsky and Beverly Joel. Leveling the Playing Field: Advancing Women in Jewish Organizational Life. Advancing Women Professionals and the Jewish Community and Cambridge Leadership Associates, 2008.
- Heifetz, Ronald A., and Marty Linsky. Leadership on the Line: Staying Alive through the Dangers of Change. Harvard Business School Press, 2017.
