= Jimmy in Saigon =

2022 American LGBTQ+ documentary film

Other People's Bodies
- Theatrical film poster
- Directed by: Peter McDowell
- Written by: Peter McDowell
- Produced by: John McDowell; Peter McDowell; Lucia Palmarini; Peter Schulman
- Starring: James McDowell; Peter McDowell
- Release dates: March 19, 2022 (BFI Flare); April 25, 2025 (USA)
- Running time: 89 minutes
- Country: United States
- Languages: English; French; Vietnamese

Jimmy in Saigon is a 2022 American LGBTQ+ documentary film, directed and written by Peter McDowell. The film focuses on the life and mysterious death of the director's brother, James. It premiered at BFI Flare: London LGBTIQ+ Film Festival in 2022, before a limited theatrical release in the USA in 2025.

== Synopsis ==
This film is a documentary exploring the mysterious death of Peter McDowell's eldest brother, James, who died age 24 in Saigon. The film explores unspoken grief and family secrets, while honoring those lost long ago.

== Cast ==
All cast members are listed as "Self".

- Jimmy McDowell
- Peter McDowell

== Reception ==
On the review aggregator website Rotten Tomatoes, 92% of 13 critics' reviews are positive, with an average rating of 7.50/10.

Kelly Vance of the East Bay Express praised the intentions: "Peter McDowell's 50-years-late tribute to his brother's tragic wartime romance makes it clear that Jimmy hid his relationship from his family because he feared their condemnation—when it was suggested to his mother that he might be gay, she refused to hear it. Jimmy wasn't a Symbolist poet like Arthur Rimbaud, and he never played Russian roulette for money. He is remembered not for any heroic exploits, but for having found a love that he had to keep hidden. The story is simultaneously sad and predictable, yet tender and tentative. It's Jimmy's secret garden, devotedly tended by his brother for all to see."

Dennis Harvey of the 48 Hills commented: "Yet it's still a fascinating, if also somewhat frustrating, partial glimpse into a short life that covered its tracks pretty thoroughly." Kathy Fennessy of Video Librarian rated it 3/5 stars and mused: "Peter ends by saying that he feels he has helped his family to heal... We can't know for certain that this is true, but it does seem to have brought him closer to his mother, and to a sense of peace, knowing that Jimmy might have been a kindred spirit." Kent Hill of Film Threat lauded: "But the tale his brother unravels is that of a vital spark who lived what life he had to the fullest, and on his own terms."
