= Edward Hanley (state cabinet secretary) =

American politician

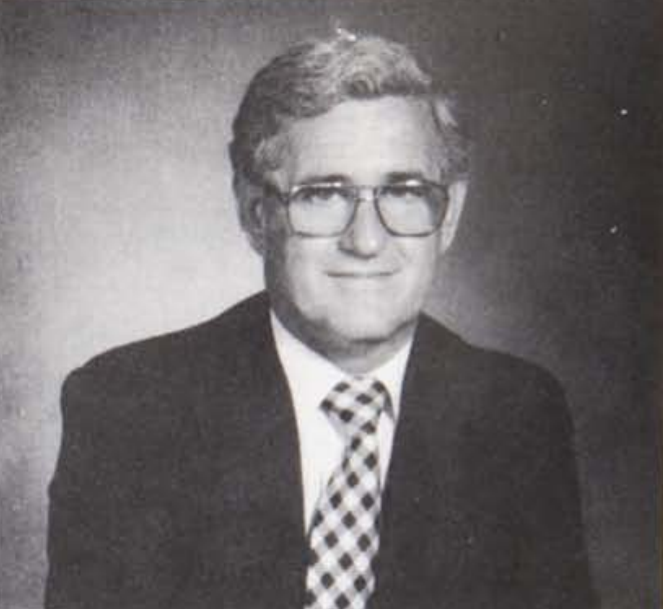

Massachusetts Secretary of Administration & Finance
- In office 1979–1982
- Governor: Edward J. King
- Preceded by: John R. Buckley
- Succeeded by: David M. Bartley

Executive Director of Massachusetts Port Authority Acting
- In office 1974–1975
- Preceded by: Edward J. King
- Succeeded by: David W. Davis

Personal details
- Born: Edward Thomas Hanley; December 16, 1928 Mission Hill, Boston, Massachusetts
- Died: June 12, 2007 (aged 78) Westwood, Massachusetts
- Party: Independent (1980-2007); Democratic (Until 1980)
- Spouse: Theresa Connors
- Children: 8
- Education: Boston College (BA, LLB)

Military service
- Branch/service: United States Navy
- Battles/wars: World War II

Edward Thomas Hanley (December 16, 1928 – June 12, 2007) was an American government official who served as Massachusetts Secretary of Administration and Finance and vice chairman of the Massachusetts Turnpike Authority. He was a close aide to Edward J. King beginning during their days at the Massachusetts Port Authority.

== Early life ==
Hanley was born in Mission Hill to Irish immigrants. His father was a taxicab driver. During his youth, Hanley sold peanuts at Fenway Park and attended Mission Hill Grammar School. He credited the School Sisters of Notre Dame, who ran the Mission Hill Grammar School, for his drive to seek a way out of poverty. During World War II, Hanley served in the United States Navy. He also worked as a bartender in Mission Hill. During this time, he met Theresa Connors, a nursing student. The couple married in 1956 would have eight children, one of whom died during infancy.

After the war, Hanley attended Bentley's School of Accounting and Finance (now Bentley University) on the G.I. Bill and became a certified public accountant. In 1958 earned a business degree from Boston College. He then attended Boston College Law School at night. He got his law degree in 1962 and passed the bar that same year.

== Massachusetts Port Authority ==
In 1953, Hanley met Edward J. King, a fellow accountant at Lybrand, Ross Brothers & Montgomery (now PricewaterhouseCoopers). In 1960, when King became secretary-treasurer of the Massachusetts Port Authority, Hanley joined him as comptroller. When King was promoted to executive director in 1963, Hanley succeeded him as secretary-treasurer. During their tenure at Massport, King and Hanley worked on immensely expanding Boston's Logan Airport. Hanley was praised by Massport board member John Larkin Thompson for his management of the port authority's financial affairs. When King was fired by the Massachusetts Port Authority Board of Directors in 1974, Hanley served as interim executive director for several months before leaving to start a private tax law practice with John J. Egan, the father-in-law of King's brother. He was also appointed to the board of directors of Catholic Charities USA and Blue Shield of Massachusetts.

== Secretary of Administration and Finance ==
When King was elected governor in 1978, Hanley left his lucrative law practice to accept the lower paying job of Secretary of Administration and Finance. Hanley was King's first appointment as Governor. During his tenure in King's cabinet, Hanley was seen as being King's closest advisor, earning him the informal title of "deputy governor". He received praise for accurate revenue projections and for being an even-tempered but tough financial manager during the turmoil that came after Proposition 2½ was adopted. However, he was criticized for not being able to cut enough from the state budget to achieve King's campaign promise of rolling taxes back by $500 million. He was also charged with having alienated the Governor's base by drawing out contract negotiations with labor unions. He was further criticized by his fellow cabinet members for having a negative attitude and for sitting in on their meetings with King.

In November 1981, it was reported that Hanley would resign from the cabinet due to his concern over the state of his tax business following Egan's death. He announced his resignation later that year in order to return to the practice. He was succeeded by David M. Bartley the following January.

== Massachusetts Turnpike Authority ==
On June 30, 1980, Hanley changed his political registration from Democratic to Unenrolled. This was seen as an indication that he would be appointed to the Massachusetts Turnpike Authority (only two members of the commission could be of the same political party and two of the incumbent members were registered Democrats). The move came exactly two years before the term of associate commissioner Raymond Fontana was to expire. On September 28, 1982, Hanley was appointed to an eight-year term on the board. For six of the years he was on the board, Hanley served as its vice chairman. During his tenure, Hanley opposed Turnpike Authority using its bonding power to finance the Central Artery/Tunnel Project (better known as the Big Dig). In 1989, Hanley resigned due to frustration over what he viewed as an unqualified patronage appointment.

== Later life and death ==
During his adult life, Hanley and his family resided in Westwood, Massachusetts. He also owned a summer home in Mashpee, Massachusetts, for forty years.

Hanley died in Westwood on June 12, 2007, following a long illness.
