= 1978 Massachusetts gubernatorial election =

- November 7, 1978
- Turnout: 78.97% ▲4.33
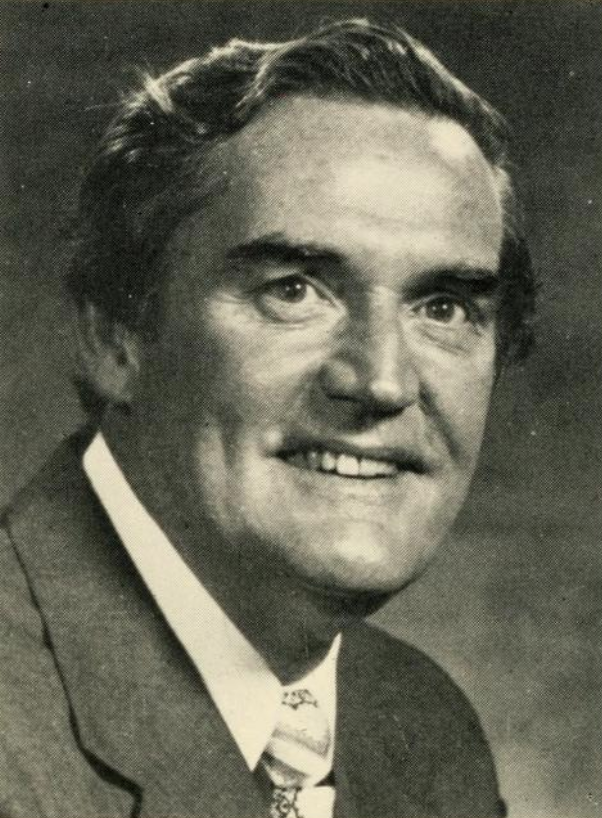

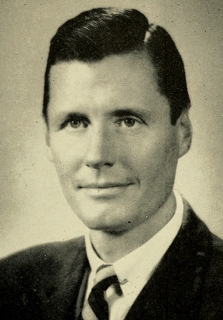
| Nominee | Edward J. King | Francis W. Hatch Jr. |
| Party | Democratic | Republican |
| Running mate | Thomas O'Neill III | William I. Cowin |
| Popular vote | 1,030,294 | 926,072 |
| Percentage | 52.51% | 47.19% |
- King: 50–60% 60–70% 70–80% Hatch: 40–50% 50–60% 60–70% 70–80% 80–90% Tie: 40–50%
Governor before election
Michael Dukakis
Democratic
Elected Governor
Edward J. King
Democratic

The 1978 Massachusetts gubernatorial election was held on November 7, 1978. Former Massachusetts Port Authority executive director Edward J. King was elected to a four-year term, from January 4, 1979, until January 6, 1983. King won the Democratic nomination by defeating incumbent governor of Massachusetts Michael Dukakis in the Democratic primary.

== Democratic primary ==
=== Governor ===
==== Candidates ====
- Barbara Ackermann, former mayor of Cambridge
- Michael Dukakis, incumbent governor
- Edward J. King, former executive director of the Massachusetts Port Authority

===== Declined =====
- David M. Bartley, former speaker of the Massachusetts House of Representatives
- Charles Flaherty, state representative from Cambridge
- Paul Guzzi, secretary of the commonwealth (ran for U.S. Senate)
- Kevin Harrington, president of the Massachusetts State Senate
- Robert H. Quinn, former Massachusetts attorney general and candidate for governor in 1974
- Alan Sisitsky, state senator from Springfield
- Robert Coldwell Wood, president of the University of Massachusetts

==== Campaign ====
On October 25, 1977, Edward J. King announced that he would seek the Democratic nomination for governor. King also considered running as an Independent or a Republican. King attacked Dukakis for not keeping his promises, specifically his pledge not to raise taxes. A fiscal and social conservative, King was anti-abortion and supported capital punishment, offshore drilling, increased nuclear power, greater research on solar energy, less business regulation, raising the drinking age to 21, and mandatory sentences for drug dealers.

On March 30, 1978, Ackerman announced her candidacy for governor. She positioned herself as the party's liberal alternative to Dukakis. She criticized the governor for failing to deliver adequate human services, not cutting the cost of government, and not attracting new jobs.

During the primary race, King was critical of Dukakis, Ackerman attacked Dukakis' record and King's positions on the issues, and Dukakis focused on his accomplishments and ignored his two opponents. Due to his incumbency, Dukakis held the early lead in the race. King was able to raise more money than his opponents due to his support from the business community. King focused his spending on extensive media advertising, while Dukakis spent more money on organization than advertising. Ackerman struggled to raise money throughout the campaign and could not afford to advertise on television or in a daily newspaper.

==== Results ====
Democratic primary results by municipality

King upset Dukakis 51% to 42% with Ackerman receiving the remaining 7%.

1978 Massachusetts Democratic gubernatorial primary
| Party | Candidate | Votes | % |
|---|---|---|---|
| Democratic | Edward J. King | 442,174 | 51.07% |
| Democratic | Michael Dukakis (incumbent) | 365,417 | 42.20% |
| Democratic | Barbara Ackermann | 58,220 | 6.72% |
| Write-in | All others | 48 | 0.01% |

=== Lieutenant governor ===
==== Candidates ====
- Thomas P. O'Neill III, incumbent lieutenant governor

===== Declined =====
- Jack Backman, state senator from Brookline
- John L. Buckley, secretary of administration and finance
- Paul Guzzi, secretary of the commonwealth (running for U.S. Senate)
- Philip W. Johnston, state representative from Marshfield
- Michael McLaughlin, Middlesex County commissioner
- Ronald Pine, state representative
- Lois Pines, state representative from Newton
- Rosemarie Sansone, Boston city councilwoman
- Alan Sisitsky, state senator from Springfield

==== Results ====
Incumbent Thomas O'Neill III was unopposed for renomination.

== Republican primary ==
=== Governor ===
==== Candidates ====
- Francis W. Hatch Jr., minority leader of the Massachusetts House of Representatives
- Edward F. King, businessman and anti-tax activist

===== Withdrew =====
- John Buckley, Middlesex County sheriff

===== Declined =====
- Donald R. Dwight, former lieutenant governor
- Elliot Richardson, former Massachusetts attorney general and member of the Ford administration

==== Campaign ====
On October 27, 1977, Massachusetts House minority leader Francis W. Hatch Jr. became the first Republican candidate for governor. He was joined at his first campaign press conference by former ambassador Henry Cabot Lodge Jr., former state senator Philip A. Graham, and former state party chairman William A. Barnstead. He believed that the real issues of the campaign were property tax relief, creating jobs and improving the state's economy, welfare reform, revamping auto insurance, and making government more open.

In November 1977, party chairman Gordon M. Nelson leaked a poll of Republican campaign contributors that showed Richardson was the top choice for governor with 47% followed by Edward F. King with 27%, Hatch with 18%, former governor Francis W. Sargent with 7%, and Middlesex County Sheriff John J. Buckley with 2%.

On January 4, 1978, Edward F. King announced his candidacy for governor. A businessman who founded and ran a data consulting company and a real estate company, King ran as a political outsider. He was best known for leading the successful campaign to defeat the graduated income tax proposals in 1972 and 1976. A conservative, he listed Ronald Reagan and Meldrim Thomson Jr. as among his heroes. King pledged to cut the state budget by $600 million and eliminate some agencies and programs. He took stances against busing, abortion, gay rights, and gun control. King focused his early campaign on winning the Republican state convention, which he believed would catapult him through the primary and victory over Dukakis in the general election. He pledged to drop out of the race if he did not win the convention vote.

Because Edward F. King had the same name as Democratic candidate Edward J. King, the two candidates were often confused with each other. As the younger and lesser known candidate, Edward F. King believed that the name confusion worked to his advantage as it gave his name double exposure. Conversely, as the better known candidate, Edward J. King became wary of the confusion. In addition to having the same name, the two Kings also had similar political positions (they both ran as pro-business, anti-tax conservatives) and both attended Boston College (Edward J. King graduated, but Edward F. King left to go into business). Physically, the two were not alike, as the Democratic King was large (six feet tall) and quiet, while the Republican was five foot-six and described as "fiery".

On February 6, 1978, John J. Buckley entered the GOP race. Buckley believed that as a fiscal conservative who was liberal on social issues, he was the best Republican candidate to beat Dukakis. He also cited the fact that he had been elected in a heavily Democratic county while King had never run for public office before and Hatch had lost his previous bids for higher office as another reason why he was the best candidate. Buckley reiterated his opposition to the death penalty and promised to veto any attempts to eliminate abortions. He also stated that he wanted to let private businesses perform many state functions, including the Medicaid program. He declined to promise that he would not raise taxes.

The Republican Convention was held on May 6, 1978, at the Symphony Hall in Springfield, Massachusetts. On the first ballot, King received a plurality of the votes with 898 to Hatch's 874 and Buckley's 212. Before the second ballot, Buckley announced that he was withdrawing his candidacy and attempted to move his delegates to Hatch. However, King won the nomination. After the defeat, Hatch announced that he would challenge King in the primary. Although Buckley withdrew at the convention he still considered running in the primary. However, on May 17 he officially exited the governor's race. He later entered the race for the United States House of Representatives seat in Massachusetts's 5th congressional district, which was being vacated by Paul Tsongas.

During the primary campaign, King attacked Hatch for being a "professional politician" and an "insurgent" candidate. He stated as House Minority Leader, Hatch shared a responsibility for higher taxes and spending. King also touted his role as a leader in the taxpayer revolt. Hatch, on the other hand, ignored King and focused his attack on the Democratic frontrunner and incumbent governor Michael Dukakis.

==== Results ====
Hatch defeated King 56% to 44%.

1978 Massachusetts Republican gubernatorial primary
| Party | Candidate | Votes | % |
|---|---|---|---|
| Republican | Francis W. Hatch Jr. | 141,070 | 55.96% |
| Republican | Edward F. King | 110,932 | 44.01% |
| Write-in | All others | 86 | 0.03% |

=== Lieutenant governor ===
==== Candidates ====
- William I. Cowin, former secretary of administration and finance (running with Hatch)
- Peter McDowell, state representative from Dennis (running with King)

==== Campaign ====
On April 28, 1978, Edward F. King chose State Representative Peter McDowell to be his running mate. McDowell was chosen by King largely because McDowell opposed a clause in an ethics bill supported by King's primary opponent, Francis W. Hatch Jr., that would require politicians to disclose all clients they had done more than $1000 worth of business with. He felt the provision was unfair because businesses would not want to disclose this information for competitive reasons. He also felt it was unfair to the clients to have their names disclosed because they had nothing to do with political activities. Following King's victory at the Republican convention, McDowell was acclaimed as the party's nominee.

After John J. Buckley dropped out at the convention to support Hatch, it was rumored that Hatch would select Buckley to be his running mate. However, on May 25, 1978, Hatch announced that former Secretary of Administration and Finance William I. Cowin would be his running mate.

==== Results ====
Cowin defeated McDowell in the Republican primary to become his party's nominee for lieutenant governor.

1978 Massachusetts Republican lieutenant gubernatorial primary
| Party | Candidate | Votes | % |
|---|---|---|---|
| Republican | William I. Cowin | 128,914 | 59.90% |
| Republican | Peter McDowell | 86,250 | 40.08% |
| Write-in | All others | 41 | 0.02% |

== General election ==
=== Campaign ===
Due to the presence of a conservative Democrat and a liberal Republican in the race, there were some members of each party that endorsed the other's candidate. William A. Casey, the Republican nominee for Massachusetts State Auditor, dropped out of the race to endorse King. Unsuccessful Republican gubernatorial candidate Edward F. King, California anti-tax activist Howard Jarvis, New Hampshire Governor Meldrim Thomson, and Lloyd B. Waring, a prominent Republican fundraiser and former chairman of the Massachusetts Republican Party, also endorsed King.

Conversely, unsuccessful Democratic candidate Barbara Ackermann, state representatives Barney Frank, Mel King, Saundra Graham, Doris Bunte, Robert L. Fortes, and James Segel, Chelsea Mayor Joel Pressman, and the board of the directors of the Massachusetts chapter of Americans for Democratic Action endorsed Hatch. Lieutenant Governor Thomas P. O'Neill III considered dropping out of the race instead of running on the same ticket as King. However, he chose to remain on the ticket but express his own ideology.

=== Results ===
The King-O'Neill ticket defeated the Hatch-Cowin ticket 53% to 47%.

1978 Massachusetts gubernatorial election
| Party | Candidate | Votes | % | ±% |
|---|---|---|---|---|
| Democratic | Edward J. King (Thomas P. O'Neill III) | 1,030,294 | 52.51% | ▼0.99 |
| Republican | Francis W. Hatch Jr. (William I. Cowin) | 926,072 | 47.19% | ▲4.90 |
| Write-in | All others | 5,885 | 0.30% | |
| Majority | | 104,222 | 20.30% | |

=== Results by county ===
1978 United States gubernatorial election in Massachusetts (by county)
| County | King - D % | King - D # | Hatch Jr. - R % | Hatch Jr. - R # | Write-ins % | Write-ins # | Total # |
|---|---|---|---|---|---|---|---|
| Barnstable | 37.5% | 21,986 | 61.8% | 36,198 | 0.7% | 425 | 58,609 |
| Berkshire | 46.1% | 22,660 | 53.5% | 26,285 | 0.3% | 164 | 49,109 |
| Bristol | 61.1% | 87,175 | 38.8% | 55,406 | 0.1% | 184 | 142,765 |
| Dukes | 29.2% | 1,201 | 69.3% | 2,851 | 1.6% | 64 | 4,116 |
| Essex | 50.6% | 122,567 | 49.0% | 118,752 | 0.4% | 858 | 242,187 |
| Franklin | 36.5% | 8,157 | 63.3% | 14,121 | 0.2% | 45 | 22,323 |
| Hampden | 48.3% | 64,316 | 51.5% | 68,518 | 0.2% | 250 | 133,084 |
| Hampshire | 38.1% | 16,216 | 61.7% | 26,303 | 0.2% | 85 | 42,604 |
| Middlesex | 52.1% | 360,363 | 47.6% | 237,911 | 0.3% | 1,710 | 499,984 |
| Nantucket | 32.0% | 570 | 68.0% | 1,209 | 0.0% | 0 | 1,779 |
| Norfolk | 52.7% | 127,532 | 46.9% | 113,633 | 0.4% | 878 | 242,043 |
| Plymouth | 54.8% | 68,594 | 44.7% | 55,652 | 0.4% | 547 | 124,794 |
| Suffolk | 61.5% | 113,967 | 38.5% | 71,281 | 0.0% | 85 | 185,333 |
| Worcester | 53.9% | 115,151 | 45.8% | 97,780 | 0.3% | 590 | 213,521 |

Counties that flipped from Democratic to Republican

- Berkshire
- Franklin
- Hampden
- Hampshire

== See also ==
- 1977–1978 Massachusetts legislature
