= Peter McDowell =

American politician

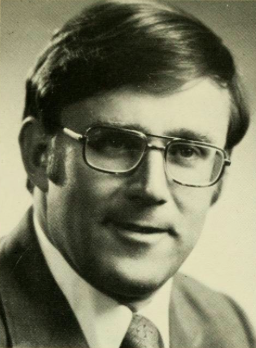

Member of the Massachusetts House of Representatives from the 4th Barnstable District
- In office 1975–1979
- Preceded by: District created
- Succeeded by: District eliminated

Personal details
- Born: June 5, 1938 Hyannis, Massachusetts
- Died: July 19, 2024 (aged 86) Dennis, Massachusetts
- Party: Republican
- Education: General Motors Institute
- Occupation: Builder; Realtor; Politician

Peter L. McDowell (June 5, 1938 – July 19, 2024) was an American politician who represented the 4th Barnstable District in the Massachusetts House of Representatives from 1975 to 1979. He was a candidate for Lieutenant Governor of Massachusetts in 1978.

== Early life and business ==
McDowell was born on June 5, 1938 in Hyannis, Massachusetts. He was raised in Dennis, Massachusetts and graduated from Yarmouth High School and the General Motors Institute. In 1965, McDowell started Peter McDowell Associates, a building construction, land development, and real estate company. In 2015, the company merged with Foran Realty.

== Politics ==
McDowell began his political career in 1965 when he was elected to the Dennis planning board. From 1972 to 1989, he was Dennis town moderator. He appointed the town's first female town meeting tellers and the first woman to serve on the Dennis finance committee. From 1975 to 1979, he represented the 4th Barnstable District in the Massachusetts House of Representatives.

On April 28, 1978, Republican gubernatorial candidate Edward F. King chose McDowell to be his running mate. McDowell was chosen by King largely because he opposed a clause in an ethics bill supported by King's primary opponent, Francis W. Hatch Jr., that would require politicians to disclose all clients they had done more than $1000 worth of business with. Following King's victory at the Republican convention, McDowell was acclaimed as the convention's choice for Lieutenant Governor. McDowell was challenged in the Republican primary by William I. Cowin, who ran as Hatch's running mate. Cowin defeated Hatch 60% to 40% to become the Republican nominee for lieutenant governor.

After leaving the state legislature, McDowell served on the Dennis finance committee for 20 years and the Dennis water district board of commissioners for 15 years. He died at home on July 19, 2024.
