= James Milkey =

American judge and lawyer (born 1956)

James R. Milkey

Associate Justice of the Massachusetts Appeals Court
- In office April 8, 2009 – September 3, 2024
- Nominated by: Deval Patrick
- Preceded by: William Cowin
- Succeeded by: Vacant

Personal details
- Born: December 17, 1956 (age 69) Hartford, Connecticut, U.S.
- Education: Harvard University (BA, JD); Massachusetts Institute of Technology (MS)

James R. Milkey (born December 17, 1956) is an American judge and former environmental lawyer who served as an associate justice of the Massachusetts Appeals Court.

== Early life and education ==
Milkey was born in Hartford, Connecticut, and earned an undergraduate degree and a J.D. degree from Harvard University. Milkey also earned a master's degree in city planning from MIT.

== Legal career ==
Milkey served as a law clerk to Appellate Justice Benjamin Kaplan, did research for the Boston Foundation, and interned for the Department of Interior. In 1984, Milkey joined the environmental protection division of the Massachusetts Attorney General's office. Milkey became head of the division in 1996. Concerned about global warming, Milkey initiated the case Massachusetts v. Environmental Protection Agency, joining with eleven other states to argue that the George W. Bush administration should regulate carbon emissions under the Clean Air Act. The case made its way to the Supreme Court, with Milkey himself arguing before the court that carbon dioxide and other greenhouse gases should be regulated by the EPA as air pollutants. Massachusetts prevailed in a 5–4 decision. The EPA would ultimately begin regulating greenhouse gases under the Obama administration.

Milkey was appointed to the Massachusetts Appeals Court by Governor Deval Patrick, joining the court in 2009. He retired from the court on September 3, 2024.
