= Francis Sargent =

American politician (1915–1998)

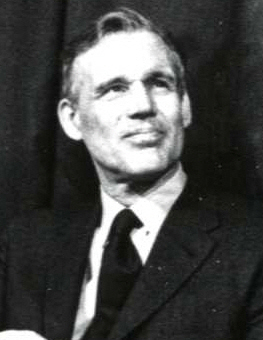

64th Governor of Massachusetts
- In office January 22, 1969 – January 2, 1975; Acting 1969–1971
- Lieutenant: Donald Dwight
- Preceded by: John A. Volpe
- Succeeded by: Michael Dukakis

63rd Lieutenant Governor of Massachusetts
- In office January 2, 1967 – January 4, 1971
- Governor: John A. Volpe
- Preceded by: Elliot Richardson
- Succeeded by: Donald R. Dwight

Personal details
- Born: Francis Williams Sargent; July 29, 1915 Hamilton, Massachusetts, U.S.
- Died: October 22, 1998 (aged 83) Dover, Massachusetts, U.S.
- Resting place: Highland Cemetery, Dover, Massachusetts
- Party: Republican
- Spouse: Jessie Sargent (m. 1938)
- Education: Massachusetts Institute of Technology

Military service
- Allegiance: United States
- Branch/service: United States Army
- Unit: 10th Mountain Division
- Battles/wars: World War II

Francis Williams Sargent (July 29, 1915 – October 22, 1998) was an American politician who served as the 64th governor of Massachusetts from 1969 to 1975. A member of the Republican Party, he previously served as the 63rd lieutenant governor of Massachusetts from 1967 to 1971. In 1969, he became acting governor when John A. Volpe resigned to become Secretary of Transportation under the Nixon administration. In 1970, he was elected governor in his own right, defeating the Democratic Party's nominee Kevin White. He lost reelection in 1974 to Democrat Michael Dukakis.

== Early life, education, and early career ==
Sargent was born in 1915 in Hamilton, Massachusetts, the son of Margery (Lee) and Francis Williams Sargent. He was known for his sharp wit and self-deprecating manner. A Republican, "Sarge" graduated from Charles River School, and then Noble and Greenough School.

Sargent was a student in the architecture program (class of 1939) at the Massachusetts Institute of Technology, where he was a classmate and friend of architect I.M. Pei. Sargent received a special degree in architecture after completing four years of what was then a five-year program, rather than a normal graduation.

After MIT, Sargent worked for the architectural firm of Coolidge Shepley Bulfinch and Abbott as a draftsman, leaving to work as a carpenter for a general contractor to learn the building trade. He then started his own firm, Sargent & Sweeney.

Sargent served in World War II, fighting in Italy, earned a Bronze Star, and a Purple Heart. He enlisted in 1942, volunteered for the ski troops, and rose from private to corporal to sergeant to lieutenant to captain while serving with the 10th Mountain Division in Italy.

After the war, Sargent moved with his family to Orleans on Cape Cod, where he and his son started and ran the Goose Hummock sporting goods store, beginning in 1946.

== Government and politics ==
Sargent served as the Director of Marine Fisheries for ten years, from 1947 to 1957. Between 1959 and 1962 he was in Washington, D.C., as the executive director of the U.S. Outdoor Recreation Resources Review Commission. He was appointed as the state Commissioner of Public Works in Massachusetts in 1964, a position he held for two years.

=== Elections ===
In 1962, Sargent ran for a seat in the Massachusetts state Senate, but lost.

In 1966, Sargent ran for and was elected as Lieutenant Governor of Massachusetts with the slogan "Put Sarge in Charge". In 1969, he became acting governor when Governor John A. Volpe (R) resigned to become secretary of Transportation under President Richard Nixon. In 1970, Sargent won the gubernatorial election in his own right, defeating Boston Mayor Kevin White.

According to a biography of Barney Frank, White was the first mayor to declare the city had a race problem, and people wanted to keep him as mayor instead of making him governor. Frank said, "Sargent was seen as a good liberal and some liberals reasoned that if we elect Kevin White as governor, who knows who is going to be Mayor of Boston." Frank also said it was Sargent's popularity that won him the election.

Sargent retired from politics after running for reelection and being defeated by Democrat Michael Dukakis in the 1974 gubernatorial election. Among the factors contributing to his defeat was voter distaste for the Watergate scandal, and an economic slowdown.

=== Policies as governor ===
When Sargent first entered office, the budget was in turmoil because of spending increases on welfare and other benefits. He tightened rules for qualifying for Medicaid and introduced a new corporate tax.

He was governor of the Commonwealth during the strife over school busing following Judge W. Arthur Garrity's 1974 decision to desegregate Boston public schools through court-mandated redistricting of the Boston school system, including busing some students out of their neighborhoods to end a pattern of racial segregation in the schools. Sargent had previously vetoed attempts to repeal or water down the state's Racial Imbalance Act, which prohibited state aid to racially imbalanced school districts. When Sargent called for obeying the federal court order, anti-busing forces complained that he and his neighbors in the well-to-do suburban Boston town of Dover, Massachusetts, did not have to share any of the burden of desegregating Boston schools.

Carl Sheridan, a former Dover police chief, said of the incident, "I think people will most remember him for the busing situation. I remember one time a bus load of demonstrators came out to Dover looking for Sargent and his house. But because the town had no street lights, they got out of the bus and were standing in the pitch black. They got back in the bus and left. Sargent was still laughing about that two weeks ago."

Sargent also created the weekend prison furlough program. After the Massachusetts Supreme Judicial Court ruled that the right extended to first-degree murderers because the statute did not specifically exclude them, the Massachusetts legislature quickly passed a bill to prohibit furloughs for such inmates. However, in 1976, Michael Dukakis vetoed that bill.

Sargent also created the Massachusetts Appeals Court in 1972, and selected Alan M. Hale, then a justice of the Superior Court at the time, along with David Rose, Edmund Keville, Reuben Goodman, Donald Grant, and Christopher Armstrong, to the bench. They were sworn under oath in October 1972. Sargent said of the experience, "I wasn't too darn anxious to come here. I liked what I was doing. I enjoyed the experience on the Superior Court, meeting people and lawyers all over the State. I didn't want to leave, but the challenge of setting up an entirely new court was one I could not refuse." Sargent went on to speak of Chief Justice Hale and his five associates, "I have sought individuals who have a proven record of outstanding legal accomplishment, wisdom and good judgment. It is my belief that the men we have selected will allow this court to take its rightful place in our judicial system. It is a bench both balanced and responsive. It will, from the outset, be able to shoulder its full share of an appellate overload which for many years has been staggering." He called the creation of the Appeals Court "the single most significant step in judicial reform in Massachusetts this century."

=== Cabinet ===
Governor Francis W. Sargent (right) supporting William L. Saltonstall (left) during his campaign for the US Congress, in Haverhill, 1969

The Sargent Cabinet
OFFICE	NAME	TERM
Governor	Francis W. Sargent	1969 – 1975
Lt. Governor	Donald R. Dwight	1971 – 1975
Secretary of Transportation	Alan Altshuler	1972 – 1975
Secretary of Communities and Development	Thomas I. Atkins	1971 – 1975
Secretary of Environmental Affairs	Charles H. W. Foster	1971 – 1975
Secretary of Consumer Affairs	William I. Cowin; John R. Verani	1971 – 1972; 1972 – 1975
Secretary of Manpower Affairs	Mary B. Newman	1971 – 1975
Secretary of Human Services	Peter C. Goldmark, Jr. Lucy W. Benson	1971 – 1974; 1974 – 1975
Secretary of Elder Affairs	Rose Claffey	1974 – 1975
Commissioner of Administration and Finance	Donald R. Dwight; Charles R. Shepard; Robert Yasi; William I. Cowin; David Marchand	1969 – 1970; 1970 – 1971; 1971 – 1972; 1972 – 1974; 1974 – 1975
Secretary of Public Safety	Richard E. McLaughlin	1971 – 1975
Secretary of Energy	Henry Lee	1971 – 1975

== Conservationist ==
Sargent was an avid fisherman on Cape Cod and became interested in the environment because he was frustrated by overfishing and the use of illegal nets. A dedicated conservationist, he delivered the keynote address at MIT on the first Earth Day in 1970.

=== Anti Inner Belt ===
Sargent achieved renown among conservationists and advocates of a multi-modal urban transportation system by canceling most highway construction inside Route 128, with the exception of the Northern Expressway in 1970. Sargent became a strong advocate for changing the federal laws governing aid to states for highway construction so that more funds were available for mass transit projects such as subways and light-rail vehicles.

Frederick P. Salvucci, an engineer, said this of Sargent and the cancellation of the inner belt:

Yes, of course. In many ways the most thrilling moment in the history of the antihighway fight was when we won. And then Governor Sargent went on television and said, basically, he had been the public works commissioner who had fought for the inner belt earlier in his career and, as governor he said it was a mistake and "I'm going to admit that mistake and stop the program and we're going to shift towards public transportation." I mean it was thrilling. It was thrilling for us that had worked hard on it, but also, in fairness to Sargent how often do you see a public official who gets up and says, "I was wrong"? I mean it was an incredibly courageous thing for Frank Sargent to do, and I'm a Democrat. I don't say many good things about republicans. But he was a great man. I mean he had worked for this program. He always had an environmentalist bent to him. [A] lot of people do political analysis as to why he did this or that. I think he just believed what he said. "This was a mistake and we're going to go in a different direction." It was a thrilling moment in the history of it.

And then we actually moved in that new direction. I mean we shifted the funds, partly under Governor Sargent, partly under Governor Dukakis. Those monies that were going to go into destroying those neighborhoods or building the highways were shifted into refurbishing the commuter rail system, extending the Red Line, relocating the Orange Line, basically rebuilding the public transportation infrastructure of the city. That came out of that decision and another component of the same decision – you can go check that speech that Frank Sargent gave – was that the only highways that would continue to be studied within Route 128 would be the depression and widening of the Central Artery and the extension of I-90 over to Logan in an additional tunnel, the two components that are today called the Big Dig. Those were really part of that, if you will, anti-highway – "anti-highway's" probably the wrong name – pro-city decision that was made by Frank Sargent to shift towards a transportation strategy that would build the city instead of destroying it.

And a major component of that was, stop building destructive roads. Another major component was, put a lot of money into improving public transportation, and the third component that we're seeing built now is, take the existing Central Artery that's there and fix it. I mean fix it both from a transportation point of view, because it doesn't work, but also fix what it did to the city by etting [sic] it underground and knit the city back together again. That was a very thrilling moment in my life, when Sargent did it. And I've always respected him a great deal because of the courage that it took to do that.

Sargent also called in Alan A. Altshuler, a political science professor at MIT take a new look at where we were headed in transportation policy. Sargent made him Secretary of Transportation and he presided over the Boston Transportation Planning Review. This review basically led to the stopping of the inner belt and the southwest expressway. Frederick P. Salvucci called them "two major very destructive interstate highways". But, the funds were reallocated towards public transportation, and saw the extension of the Red Line to Braintree and the relocation of the Orange Line.

== Later life ==
After Sargent was defeated in the election of 1974, he accepted an appointment as a senior lecturer at the Joint MIT-Harvard Center for Urban Studies. He also continued to own the Goose Hummock sporting goods store until 1986.

== Personal life ==
Sargent married Jessie Fay Sargent in 1938. She wrote a memoir in 1973 about their time in office, entitled The Governor's Wife: A View from Within. In 1969, she helped to launch the Doric Dame, a group of volunteers that led tours of the Massachusetts State House. They had a son, Francis W. "Bill" Sargent, Jr., and two daughters, Fay and Jessie (Jay).

In the Massachusetts general election of 1978, Sargent's son was considered by the State Republican Committee to succeed William A. Casey as the Republican nominee for Massachusetts State Auditor after Casey dropped out to support Democrat Edward J. King in the Governor's race. In 1996, Sargent's son was a candidate for the United States House of Representatives seat in Massachusetts's 10th congressional district in 1996. He lost the Republican nomination to Edward B. Teague III.

Sargent died on October 21, 1998, in Dover, Massachusetts. His wife Jessie died on August 15, 2008.

== See also ==
- 1971–1972 Massachusetts legislature
- 1973–1974 Massachusetts legislature

Party political offices
Preceded by Elliot Richardson	Republican nominee for Lieutenant Governor of Massachusetts; 1966	Succeeded by Donald Dwight
Preceded by John A. Volpe	Republican nominee for Governor of Massachusetts; 1970, 1974	Succeeded by Francis W. Hatch Jr.
Political offices
Preceded by Elliot Richardson	Lieutenant Governor of Massachusetts; January 5, 1967 – January 1971; Acting Governor; January 22, 1969 – January 1971	Succeeded by Donald R. Dwight
Preceded by John A. Volpe	Governor of Massachusetts; January 1971 – January 2, 1975	Succeeded by Michael Dukakis
