= 1974 Massachusetts gubernatorial election =

- November 5, 1974
- Turnout: 74.64% ▼0.53

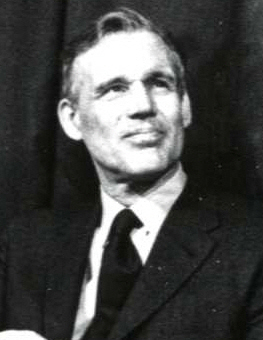
Nominee	Michael Dukakis	Francis Sargent
Party	Democratic	Republican
Running mate	Thomas O'Neill III	Donald Dwight
Popular vote	992,284	784,353
Percentage	53.50%	42.29%
- Dukakis: 30–40% 40–50% 50–60% 60–70% 70–80% Sargent: 40–50% 50–60% 60–70% 70–80% 80–90%
Governor before election
Francis Sargent
Republican
Elected Governor
Michael Dukakis
Democratic

The 1974 Massachusetts gubernatorial election was held on November 5, 1974. Michael Dukakis was elected to a four-year term, from January 2, 1975 until January 4, 1979. He defeated incumbent Governor of Massachusetts Francis W. Sargent in the general election.

Primary elections were held on September 10. In the Republican primary, Sargent defeated a challenge from former Commerce Commissioner Carroll Sheehan. In the Democratic primary, former State Representative Michael Dukakis defeated Attorney General Robert H. Quinn.

The election was dominated by the Watergate scandal and resignation of President Richard Nixon on August 8 and the Boston desegregation busing crisis, including Sargent's May 10 decision to block repeal of the 1965 Racial Imbalance Act and the June 21 court ruling in Morgan v. Hennigan, in which federal judge W. Arthur Garrity Jr. found mandated desegregation busing in Boston schools.

As of 2026, this is the most recent year in which the incumbent governor of Massachusetts lost the general election, (Note: Two governors, Dukakis and Edward J. King, lost the Democratic nomination to each other in 1978 and 1982, respectively. In 2002, acting Governor Jane Swift ran for election but withdrew after polls showed her trailing Mitt Romney for the Republican nomination.) and the earliest gubernatorial election in Massachusetts to feature a gubernatorial candidate (Michael Dukakis) who is still alive today.

== Republican primary ==
=== Governor ===
==== Candidates ====
- Francis Sargent, incumbent governor
- Carroll Sheehan, former state commerce commissioner

==== Campaign ====
In February 1974, Sheehan announced that he would challenge Sargent for the Republican nomination for governor. Sheehan blamed Sargent for high taxes and dirty and dangerous streets. He referred to the Sargent administration as "administrative experimenters and social tinkerers", singling out Secretary of Human Services Peter C. Goldmark, Jr. and former Corrections Commissioner John Boone. Although there was a large anti-Sargent sentiment, Sheehan was unable to translate it into support for his candidacy. After he publicly claimed Governor's Councilor Raymond Fontana would run on his ticket, Fontana declined to join the race.

At the Republican Convention on June 1, Sheehan had a surprisingly strong showing, gaining 32.5% of the convention votes.

Although Sargent held a large lead in the polls in late August, the governor believed that there was a chance that he could lose the Republican primary and he requested that state party chairman William Barnstead call a special meeting of the Republican State Committee so he and Sheehan could debate before them and have one of them receive the party's endorsement. Barnstead declined to call the special meeting "for the convenience of the Governor" and said that any debate between Sargent and Sheehan should be held publicly. The Republican State Committee hosted a public debate on September 5 without any endorsement. The debate was televised by WCVB-TV.

==== Results ====
1974 Massachusetts Republican gubernatorial primary
Party	Candidate	Votes	%	±%
Republican	Francis W. Sargent (incumbent)	124,250	63.32%	
Republican	Carroll Sheehan	71,936	36.66%	
Write-in	All others	46	0.02%	

=== Lieutenant governor ===
Incumbent lieutenant governor Donald R. Dwight was unopposed in the Republican primary.

== Democratic primary ==
=== Governor ===
==== Candidates ====
- Michael Dukakis, former state representative from Brookline and nominee for lieutenant governor in 1970
- Robert H. Quinn, attorney general

==== Results ====
Primary results by municipality

1974 Massachusetts Democratic gubernatorial primary
Party	Candidate	Votes	%	±%
Democratic	Michael Dukakis	444,590	57.67%	
Democratic	Robert H. Quinn	326,385	42.33%	
Write-in	All others	46	0.01%	

=== Lieutenant governor ===
==== Candidates ====
- Eva Hester, Democratic national committeewoman
- Christopher A. Iannella, Boston city councillor
- John P. Lynch, Hampden County register of deeds and candidate for U.S. Senate in 1972
- Thomas P. O'Neill III, state representative and son of U.S. Representative Tip O'Neill
- Thomas Martin Sullivan, resident of Randolph

==== Results ====

1974 Massachusetts Democratic lieutenant gubernatorial primary
Party	Candidate	Votes	%	±%
Democratic	Thomas P. O'Neill III	250,259	35.69%	
Democratic	Christopher A. Iannella	190,587	27.18%	
Democratic	Eva Hester	97,665	13.93%	
Democratic	John P. Lynch	81,874	11.68%	
Democratic	Thomas Martin Sullivan	80,745	11.52%	
Write-in	All others	15	0.00%	

== General election ==
Dukakis defeated Sargent by 207,931 votes. It was the first gubernatorial victory for the Massachusetts Democratic Party since 1962.

Massachusetts gubernatorial election, 1974
Party	Candidate	Votes	%	±%
Democratic	Michael Dukakis (Thomas P. O'Neill III)	992,284	53.50%	▲14.38
Republican	Francis W. Sargent (Donald R. Dwight) (incumbent)	784,353	42.29%	▼9.51
American	Leo F. Kahian (Nicholas J. Greco)	63,083	3.40%	N/A
Socialist Workers	Donald Gurewitz (Ollie Bivins)	15,011	0.81%	N/A

=== Results by county ===
1974 United States gubernatorial election in Massachusetts (by county)
County	Dukakis %	Dukakis #	Sargent %	Sargent #	Others %	Others #	Total #
Barnstable	40.9%	19,362	56.0%	26,539	3.2%	1,490	47,391
Berkshire	55.5%	26,947	41.4%	20,105	3.1%	1,503	48,555
Bristol	63.9%	91,839	32.8%	47,055	3.4%	4,751	143,645
Dukes	37.2%	1,346	60.5%	2,189	2.3%	84	3,619
Essex	53.6%	117,815	43.9%	96,475	2.5%	5,477	219,767
Franklin	53.6%	11,666	42.3%	9,087	3.4%	737	21,490
Hampden	65.1%	84,222	31.7%	40,978	3.2%	4,206	129,406
Hampshire	60.3%	24,051	34.3%	13,691	5.4%	2,176	39,918
Middlesex	51.9%	243,914	45.0%	211,511	3.1%	14,511	469,936
Nantucket	37.3%	537	60.1%	865	2.6%	37	1,439
Norfolk	48.9%	110,701	46.1%	104,375	4.9%	11,155	226,231
Plymouth	47.8%	54,781	46.1%	52,738	6.1%	6,962	114,431
Suffolk	47.4%	85,343	40.8%	73,491	11.8%	21,318	180,152
Worcester	57.4%	119,810	40.8%	85,254	1.8%	3,754	208,818

Counties that flipped from Republican to Democratic

- Berkshire
- Essex
- Franklin
- Middlesex
- Norfolk
- Plymouth
- Suffolk
- Worcester

== See also ==
- 1973–1974 Massachusetts legislature
