= Donald Dwight =

American newspaper executive and politician (1931–2025)

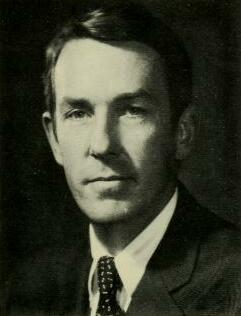

64th Lieutenant Governor of Massachusetts
- In office January 4, 1971 – January 2, 1975
- Governor: Francis Sargent
- Preceded by: Francis Sargent
- Succeeded by: Thomas P. O'Neill III

Commissioner of Administration and Finance of Massachusetts
- In office 1969–1970
- Governor: Francis Sargent
- Preceded by: Anthony P. DeFalco
- Succeeded by: Charles E. Shepard

Personal details
- Born: March 26, 1931 Holyoke, Massachusetts, U.S.
- Died: May 4, 2025 (aged 94)
- Party: Republican
- Spouse(s): Susan Russell (m. 1952; div. 1982) Nancy Sinnott Dwight (m. 1982)
- Children: Christopher, Helen, Laura; Dory; Ellie; Artie; Stuart
- Education: Princeton University (AB)
- Profession: Newspaper executive Corporate communications executive

Donald Rathbun Dwight (March 26, 1931 – May 4, 2025) was an American newspaper executive and politician who served as the 64th lieutenant governor of Massachusetts from 1971 to 1975.

== Early life ==
Donald Rathbun Dwight was born on March 26, 1931, in Holyoke, Massachusetts. His family owned the Holyoke Transcript-Telegram. Dwight graduated from Deerfield Academy in 1949 and went on to attend Princeton University. On August 9, 1952, he married Susan Russell, also of Holyoke, at the Second Congregational Church in Holyoke. Dwight graduated from Princeton in 1953. After college, he served two years in the United States Marine Corps. He then worked for his family's newspaper, where he became assistant to the publisher in 1957. He also served as a South Hadley town meeting member, director of the J. Russell and Co. and the New England Daily Newspaper Association, trustee of the Mechanics Savings Bank, chairman of Massachusetts Newspaper Information Service, treasurer of the Concord Monitor and the Valley Photo Engraving Corp., and president of the Edwardsville Intelligencer.

== Department of Public Works ==
From 1963 to 1966, Dwight was the Associate Commissioner of the Massachusetts Department of Public Works. During the final two years of his tenure, he was in charge of administration and fiscal affairs under Commissioner Francis W. Sargent. After his resignation, he resumed his job at the Holyoke Transcript.

== Commissioner of Administration and Finance ==
From September to December 1968, Dwight directed several task forces that researching state problems for Lieutenant Governor Francis W. Sargent, who was about to become Acting Governor upon the resignation of John A. Volpe. In December 1968, Dwight was appointed by Sargent to serve as Commissioner of Administration and Finance. He was sworn in on January 7, 1969. He was also named chairman of the special commission to modernize state government under Sargent.

== Lieutenant governor ==
On June 18, 1970, Sargent's running mate in the upcoming election, State Representative Martin Linsky, dropped out of the race and Sargent chose Dwight to replace him on the ticket. Linsky's withdrawal came after it was revealed that police officers had once stopped his car and informed him that the woman he was traveling with was a prostitute. Dwight had been a close confidant of Sargent since their days at the Department of Public Works and Sargent described him on more than one occasion as the man he most trusted. Dwight defeated State Senator John M. Quinlan and Springfield mayor Frank H. Freedman at the Republican convention to win his party's nomination for Lieutenant Governor.

The Sargent-Dwight ticket defeated the Democratic ticket of Kevin White and Michael Dukakis 57% to 43%. After the election, Sargent chose Dwight to conduct the search for potential cabinet members. During Dwight's tenure as Lieutenant Governor, he kept a low profile and tried not to upstage Sargent due to his respect for him. He was not involved in any major policy decisions.

During the 1974 campaign, Sargent tasked Dwight with putting the major aspects of the reelection campaign together, including coordinating advertising and assembling a field organization. Sargent and Dwight were defeated in the general election by the Democratic ticket of Michael Dukakis and Thomas P. O'Neill III 54% to 42%.

== Later life and death ==
After the defeat, Dwight began laying groundwork for a potential gubernatorial run, which he ultimately did not pursue. In September 1975, he turned down the position of Assistant Secretary of Transportation for Congressional and Intergovernmental Affairs and moved to Minneapolis to become associate publisher of the Minneapolis Star and Minneapolis Tribune. On April 20, 1976, he was promoted to president and publisher. He remained with the paper until November 1, 1982, when John Cowles Jr., president and chief executive officer of the paper's parent company Cowles Media Company, decided to take over as publisher.

In 1980, Dwight was the subject of a federal investigation relating to the awarding of a state contract during his time as Commissioner of Administration and Finance and Lieutenant Governor. The investigation came after William V. Masiello, a former design firm owner, testified before the Special Commission Concerning State and County Buildings (also known as the Ward Commission after its chairman, John William Ward) that he paid Dwight $2000 in cash in exchange for a state contract. Dwight denied the allegations and called them "an absolute lie by a professional liar". On May 11, 1981, U.S. Attorney Edward F. Harrington announced that Dwight had been cleared of any wrongdoing.

From 1984 to 1985, Dwight was president and chief executive officer of a health service company. He went on to publish seven New England newspapers and became chairman of Newspapers of New England. In 1988, he formed the public relations firm Clark, Dwight & Associates in Greenwich, Connecticut.

Dwight died on May 4, 2025, at the age of 94.

Party political offices
Preceded by Francis Sargent	Republican nominee for Lieutenant Governor of Massachusetts; 1970, 1974	Succeeded by William I. Cowin
