= 1970 Massachusetts gubernatorial election =

- November 3, 1970
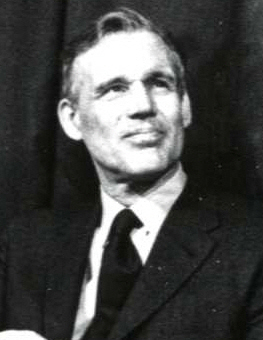

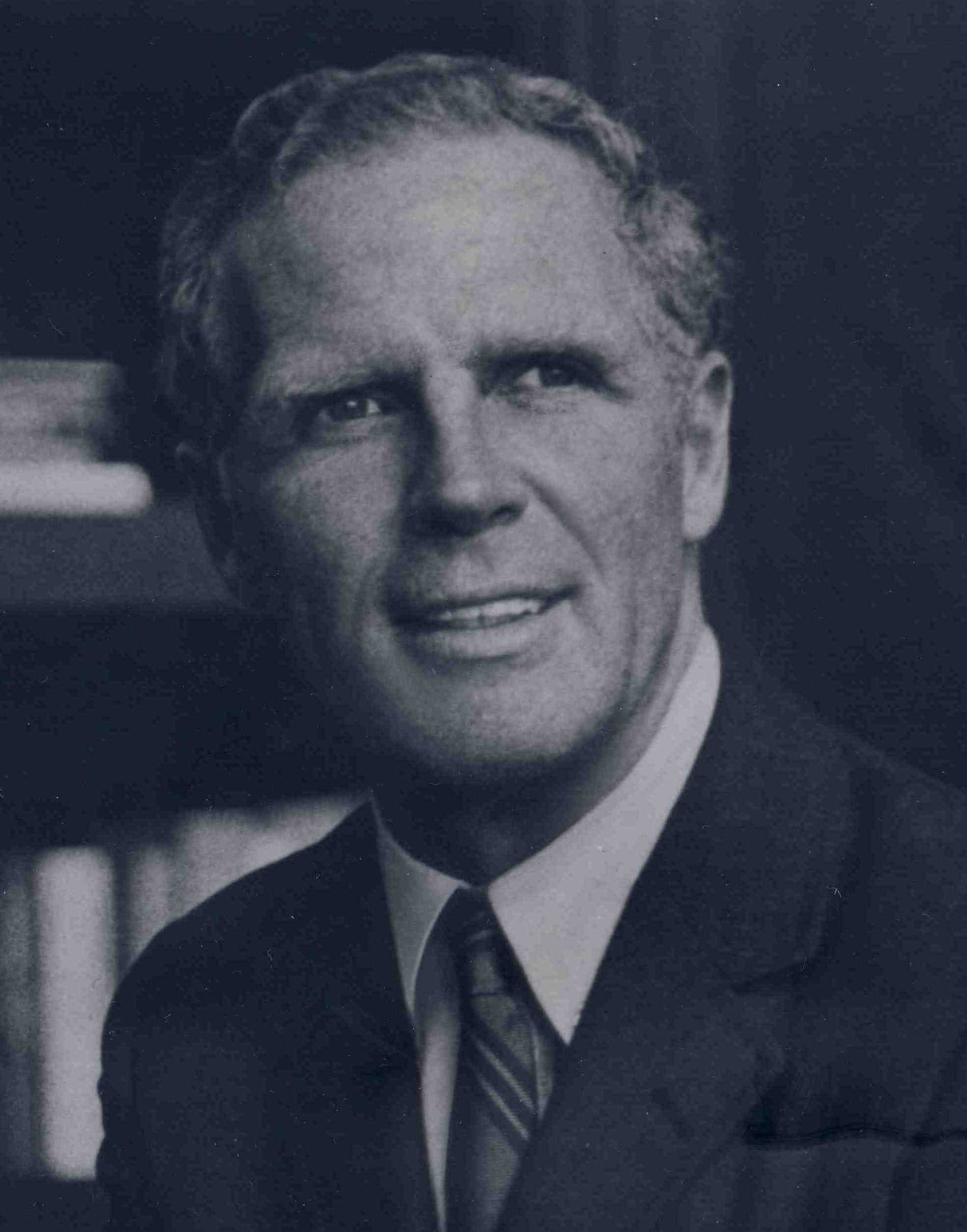
Nominee	Francis Sargent	Kevin White
Party	Republican	Democratic
Running mate	Donald R. Dwight	Michael Dukakis
Popular vote	1,058,623	799,269
Percentage	56.67%	42.79%
- Sargent: 40–50% 50–60% 60–70% 70–80% 80–90% >90% White: 40–50% 50–60% 60–70%
Governor before election
Francis Sargent (acting)
Republican
Elected Governor
Francis Sargent
Republican

The 1970 Massachusetts gubernatorial election was held on November 3, 1970. Acting Governor Francis W. Sargent was elected to a four-year term. He defeated incumbent Boston Mayor Kevin H. White in the general election.

This was the first Massachusetts election in which the governor and lieutenant governor were elected as a ticket rather than separately.

== Republican primary ==
=== Governor ===
==== Candidates ====
- Francis Sargent, acting governor

Acting Governor Francis Sargent was unopposed for renomination.

=== Lieutenant governor ===
==== Candidates ====
- Donald R. Dwight, commissioner of finance and administration

===== Eliminated at convention =====
- Frank Harlan Freedman, mayor of Springfield
- John M. Quinlan, state senator from Dover

===== Withdrew =====
- Martin A. Linsky, state representative from Brookline

==== Campaign ====
With Sargent's support, Dwight won the endorsement of the state party at the Republican convention. State Rep. Martin A. Linsky was Sargent's original choice for the nomination. However, two weeks before the convention, Linsky dropped out of the race after it was revealed that police officers had once stopped his car and informed him that the woman he was traveling with was a prostitute. After Linsky dropped out, Sargent endorsed Dwight.

== Democratic primary ==
=== Governor ===
==== Candidates ====
- Francis X. Bellotti, former lieutenant governor and nominee for governor in 1964
- Maurice A. Donahue, president of the Massachusetts Senate
- Kenneth O'Donnell, former aide to President John F. Kennedy
- Kevin White, mayor of Boston

==== Campaign ====
Donahue won the vote of the state convention held on June 15 at the Curry Hicks Cage. Donahue received 697 votes, White received 589, and the remaining 78 went to Bellotti.

==== Results ====
Despite losing at the convention, White went on to win the Democratic primary, defeating Donahue by 12,940 votes.

Primary results by municipality

1970 Massachusetts Democratic gubernatorial primary
Party	Candidate	Votes	%
Democratic	Kevin H. White	231,605	32.94%
Democratic	Maurice A. Donahue	218,665	31.10%
Democratic	Francis X. Bellotti	164,313	23.37%
Democratic	Kenneth O'Donnell	59,970	8.53%
Write-in	All others	24	<0.01%
Blank ballots		28,528	4.06%
Total votes		703,105	100.00%

=== Lieutenant governor ===
==== Candidates ====
- Rocco Antonelli, Somerville treasurer
- John J. Craven Jr., member of Boston School Committee
- Kathleen Ryan Dacey, member of Boston School Committee
- Michael Dukakis, state representative from Brookline
- James McCormack, attorney

==== Results ====

1970 Massachusetts Democratic lieutenant gubernatorial primary
Party	Candidate	Votes	%
Democratic	Michael S. Dukakis	283,849	40.37%
Democratic	James McCormack	150,901	21.46%
Democratic	Rocco Antonelli	79,348	11.29%
Democratic	Kathleen Ryan Dacey	54,205	7.71%
Democratic	John J. Craven Jr.	48,300	6.87%
Write-in	All others	12	<0.01%
Blank ballots		86,490	12.30%
Total votes		703,105	100%

== General election ==
Sargent defeated White by 259,354 votes. He won 11 of Massachusetts' 14 counties, and beat White in his home city of Boston 54–45%.

=== Results ===
Massachusetts gubernatorial election, 1970
Party	Candidate	Votes	%	±%
Republican	Francis W. Sargent (incumbent)	1,058,623	51.80%	−10.78%
Democratic	Kevin H. White	799,269	39.12%	+2.24%
Socialist Labor	Henning A. Blomen	6,747	0.33%	+0.01%
Prohibition	John C. Hedges	3,189	0.16%	−0.06%
Write-in	All others	78	<0.01%	0.00%
Blank ballots		175,381	8.59%	-6.90%
Total votes		2,043,287	100%	-1.61%

=== Results by county ===
1970 United States gubernatorial election in Massachusetts (by county)
County	Sargent %	Sargent #	White %	White #	Others %	Others #	Total #
Barnstable	73.3%	27,941	26.4%	10,051	0.3%	113	38,105
Berkshire	56.7%	24,967	42.2%	18,573	1.1%	478	44,018
Bristol	48.5%	68,994	51.3%	73,024	0.3%	365	142,383
Dukes	68.1%	1,731	31.5%	800	0.4%	10	2,541
Essex	57.9%	131,265	41.8%	94,779	0.3%	748	226,792
Franklin	60.7%	12,328	38.7%	7,848	0.7%	129	20,305
Hampden	44.0%	58,656	54.9%	73,200	1.1%	1,466	133,322
Hampshire	49.5%	18,179	50.1%	18,393	0.4%	132	36,704
Middlesex	59.5%	283,312	40.0%	190,617	0.6%	2,486	476,415
Nantucket	65.2%	854	34.6%	453	0.2%	3	1,310
Norfolk	64.7%	142,806	34.9%	77,036	0.3%	825	220,667
Plymouth	64.7%	67,294	35.0%	36,424	0.3%	311	104,029
Suffolk	53.5%	113,801	45.5%	96,636	1.0%	2,179	212,616
Worcester	51.0%	106,495	48.6%	101,435	0.3%	769	208,699

Counties that flipped from Republican to Democratic

- Bristol
- Hampden
- Hampshire

== See also ==
- 1969–1970 Massachusetts legislature
