= John R. Buckley =

American politician (1932–2020)

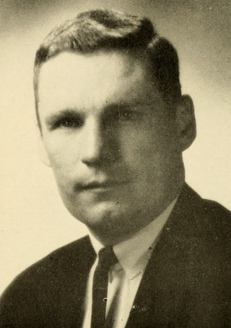

Massachusetts Secretary of Administration and Finance
- In office 1975–1979
- Governor: Michael Dukakis
- Preceded by: David Marchand
- Succeeded by: Edward Hanley

Member of the Massachusetts House of Representatives from the 3rd Plymouth District
- In office 1965–1975
- Preceded by: Alfred Shrigley
- Succeeded by: George Chester Young

Personal details
- Born: January 1, 1932 Rockland, Massachusetts
- Died: January 21, 2020 (aged 88) Abington, Massachusetts
- Party: Democratic
- Education: Harvard College

John R. "Jack" Buckley (January 1, 1932 – January 21, 2020) was an American politician who served as Secretary of Administration and Finance of Massachusetts from 1975 to 1979, member of the Massachusetts House of Representatives from 1965 to 1975, and Abington, Massachusetts Town Treasurer from 1961 to 1965. He was a candidate for state Democratic party chairman in 1971, but lost to State Treasurer Robert Q. Crane.

Buckley's father, Thomas H. Buckley, served as Massachusetts State Auditor from 1935 to 1939 and was the state's first Commissioner of Administration and Finance. His son, John R. Buckley, Jr., is the Plymouth County, Massachusetts Register of Deeds.

== See also ==
- 1955–1956 Massachusetts legislature
