= Sharon Pollard =

American politician

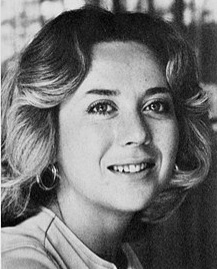
- Sharon Pollard, circa 1983

Mayor of Methuen, Massachusetts
- In office 2000–2006
- Preceded by: Dennis DiZoglio
- Succeeded by: William Manzi

Massachusetts Secretary of Energy
- In office 1983–1989
- Preceded by: Margaret St. Clair
- Succeeded by: Position eliminated

Member of the Massachusetts Senate from the Third Essex District
- In office 1977–1983
- Preceded by: James Rurak
- Succeeded by: Nicholas J. Costello

Personal details
- Born: September 21, 1950 (age 76) Methuen, Massachusetts
- Party: Democratic
- Spouse: Tom Lussier
- Education: Dunbarton College of the Holy Cross; Salem State College; John F. Kennedy School of Government

Sharon M. Pollard is an American politician who represented the Third Essex District in the Massachusetts Senate from 1977 to 1983, served as Massachusetts Secretary of Energy from 1983 to 1989, and was Mayor of Methuen, Massachusetts from 2000 to 2006.

She is married to former State Representative Tom Lussier.
