= Francis W. Hatch Jr. =

American politician and arts advocate (1925-2010)

Francis Whiting Hatch Jr.
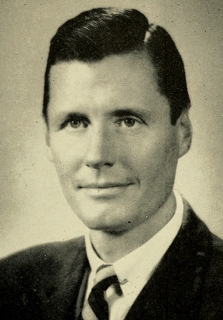
- Hatch c. 1967

Member of the Massachusetts House of Representatives
- In office 1963–1979
- Preceded by: George L. Allen
- Succeeded by: F. John Monahan

Minority Leader of the Massachusetts House of Representatives
- In office 1971–1979
- Preceded by: Sidney Curtiss
- Succeeded by: William G. Robinson

Personal details
- Born: May 6, 1925 Cambridge, Massachusetts, U.S.
- Died: April 8, 2010 (aged 84)
- Party: Republican
- Relations: Francis W. Hatch (father)
- Education: Harvard College

Francis Whiting Hatch Jr. (May 6, 1925 – April 8, 2010) was an American politician, news reporter, insurance company executive, and advocate for the arts and the environment from the Commonwealth of Massachusetts.

== Political career ==
Hatch served as member of the Beverly, Massachusetts Board of Aldermen from 1957 to 1963 and the Massachusetts House of Representatives from 1963–1979. As a state representative, Hatch authored the Hatch Act, Massachusetts' landmark wetlands protection law, in 1965. From 1971–1979 he served as the House Minority Leader.

In 1969, Hatch ran in the special election in Massachusetts's 6th congressional district. He lost the Republican nomination to state Senator William L. Saltonstall, who then lost the general election to Michael J. Harrington.

In 1978, Hatch was the Republican nominee for Governor of Massachusetts. He lost the election to Democratic Party nominee Edward J. King, who had defeated incumbent Governor Michael Dukakis in the Democratic Primary. Given that Hatch was a liberal Republican, as compared to the conservative King was, many members of the Democratic Party endorsed Hatch instead of King (who, in turn, was supported by more Republicans).

== Arts advocacy ==
For more than 30 years, Hatch served on the board of directors of the Isabella Stewart Gardner Museum. At one point he was chairman of the museum's Second Century Fund. In honor of Hatch, the museum has held a "Frank Hatch Free Day," offering the public free admission to the museum, every year since 2006. Initially held on New Year's Day, Frank Hatch Free Day was moved to Labor Day in 2013 to enable visitors to enjoy the museum's gardens and other exterior spaces in warmer weather.

== Death ==
Hatch died of a bacterial infection at his Back Bay home in Boston on April 8, 2010. He was 84.

Party political offices
Preceded by Francis W. Sargent	Massachusetts Republican Party gubernatorial candidate 1978 (lost)	Succeeded by John W. Sears
