= Jack Buckley (English footballer) =

English footballer

Personal information
- Full name: John William Buckley
- Date of birth: 24 November 1903
- Place of birth: Prudhoe, Northumberland, England
- Date of death: 13 April 1985 (aged 81)
- Place of death: Doncaster, Yorkshire, England
- Position: Right back

Senior career*
Years	Team	Apps	(Gls)
1951–1956	Prudhoe Castle		
1924–1932	Doncaster Rovers	257	(0)
1932–1935	Lincoln City	92	(0)
1935–1938	Grantham		
- * Club domestic league appearances and goals

John William Buckley (24 November 1903 – 13 April 1985) was an English footballer who made 349 appearances in the Football League playing for Doncaster Rovers and Lincoln City. He then moved into non-league football with Grantham, with whom he came runner-up in the Midland League in 1936–37. He played as a right back.
