= Thomas P. O'Neill III =

American politician (born 1944)

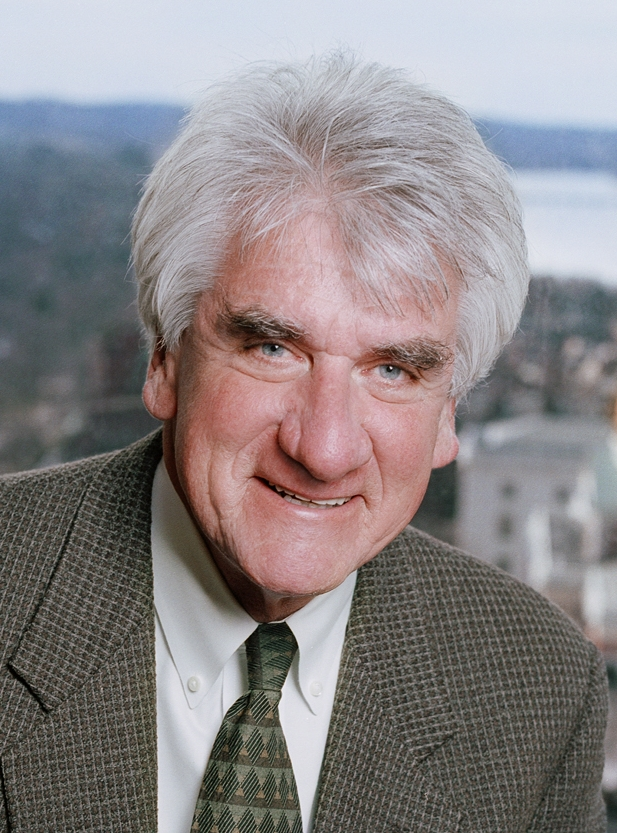
- O'Neill in 2007

65th Lieutenant Governor of Massachusetts
- In office January 2, 1975 – January 6, 1983
- Governor: Michael Dukakis; Edward J. King
- Preceded by: Donald Dwight
- Succeeded by: John Kerry

19th Chair of the National Lieutenant Governors Association
- In office 1978–1979
- Preceded by: Robert D. Orr
- Succeeded by: Bill Phelps

Member of the Massachusetts House of Representatives from the 3rd Middlesex district
- In office 1973–1974

Personal details
- Born: Thomas Phillip O'Neill III; September 20, 1944 (age 81) Cambridge, Massachusetts, U.S.
- Party: Democratic
- Parents: Thomas P. "Tip" O'Neill Jr.; Mildred Anne Miller
- Education: Boston College (BA); Harvard University (MPA)
- Profession: politician, businessman

Thomas Phillip O'Neill III (born September 20, 1944) is an American politician and businessman who served as the 65th lieutenant governor of Massachusetts.

== Early life and education ==
Born in Cambridge, Massachusetts, he is a son of Mildred Anne Miller and Thomas Phillip "Tip" O'Neill Jr., who served as Speaker of the United States House of Representatives from 1977 to 1987. O'Neill received his bachelor's degree from Boston College and earned his Master of Public Administration from Harvard University’s John F. Kennedy School of Government.

== Career ==
Prior to becoming lieutenant governor, O’Neill served as a member of the Massachusetts House of Representatives from 1973 to 1974.

From 1975 to 1983, O'Neill served as Lieutenant Governor of the Commonwealth of Massachusetts. During his term of office, O'Neill created and administered the Office of Federal-State Relations in Boston and Washington, D.C. During this time he also served on the U.S. State Department Ambassadorial Screening Committee. O'Neill is known for his work on behalf of the Big Dig, a project with which his father was instrumentally involved.

O'Neill declined to seek a third term in 1982 in order to run for Governor of Massachusetts, but ran afoul of the state Democratic Party's rule changes and failed to make the ballot.

O'Neill sits on the Board of Trustees for Boston College and chairs the Board of Trustees of Cristo Rey Boston High School, having graduated from both. He is on the board of Catholic Democrats, a national advocacy organization dealing with faith and politics.

O'Neill has public relations and government affairs firm called O'Neill and Associates in Boston. In June 2020, the firm merged with Seven Letter, a communications firm based in Washington, D.C. O'Neill will maintain control of the firm's lobbying practice.

Party political offices
Preceded by Michael Dukakis	Democratic nominee for Lieutenant Governor of Massachusetts; 1974, 1978	Succeeded by John Kerry
Political offices
Preceded by Donald R. Dwight	Lieutenant Governor of Massachusetts; 1975–1983	Succeeded by John Kerry
