= Edward J. King =

American politician (1925–2006)

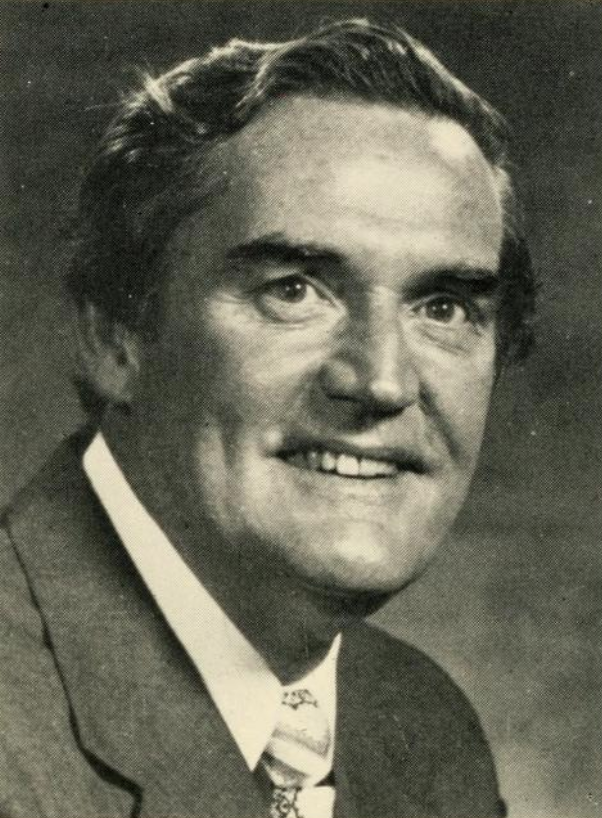
- Official portrait, 1979

66th Governor of Massachusetts
- In office January 4, 1979 – January 6, 1983
- Lieutenant: Thomas P. O'Neill III
- Preceded by: Michael Dukakis
- Succeeded by: Michael Dukakis

Executive Director of Massachusetts Port Authority
- In office 1963–1974
- Preceded by: John F. O'Halloran
- Succeeded by: David W. Davis

Personal details
- Born: Edward Joseph King; May 11, 1925 Chelsea, Massachusetts, U.S.
- Died: September 18, 2006 (aged 81) Burlington, Massachusetts, U.S.
- Party: Democratic (before 1985); Republican (1985–2006)
- Spouse: Josephine "Jody" Hurley (m. 1952; died 1995)
- Children: 2

Military service
- Branch/service: United States Navy
- Battles/wars: World War II

Edward J. King
No. 34
- Position: Guard / Defensive end

Career information
- College: Boston College
- NFL draft: 1951: 22nd round, 263rd overall pick

Career history
- Buffalo Bills (AAFC) (1948–1949); Baltimore Colts (1950)

Career NFL statistics
- Games: 31
- Stats at Pro Football Reference

Edward Joseph King (May 11, 1925 – September 18, 2006) was an American politician who served as the 66th governor of Massachusetts from 1979 to 1983. A member of the Democratic Party until 1985, he then became a member of the Republican Party. Elected in the 1978 Massachusetts gubernatorial election, he lost the Democratic primary of the 1982 election to his predecessor Michael Dukakis.

== Early life ==
King was born on May 11, 1925, in Chelsea, Massachusetts. During his teens, King worked as a pinsetter in a Revere Beach bowling alley to help pay for his schooling. In World War II he served in the United States Navy. He was given a medical discharge due to a broken ankle.

== Athletic career ==
King played college football for the Boston College Eagles football team from 1945 to 1947. He graduated from Boston College in 1948. He went on to play professional football in the All-America Football Conference (AAFC) for the Buffalo Bills in 1948 and 1949 and in the National Football League (NFL) for the Baltimore Colts during the 1950 season. He appeared in a total of 31 AAFC and NFL games, including 11 as a starter. After the Colts folded, King was selected by the New York Yanks in the 22nd round (263rd overall pick) 1951 NFL draft but did not play for the Yanks.

== Massport ==
After his athletic career, King took accounting and business courses at Bentley College. In 1953, he went to work for the accounting firm of Lybrand, Ross Bros., & Montgomery. After performing an audit for the Museum of Science he was hired to serve as its assistant director and comptroller.

In 1959, King became comptroller for the newly formed Massachusetts Port Authority (Massport). On December 23, 1961, he was appointed the port authority's secretary-treasurer. On June 18, 1963, he was named the Authority's executive director.

During King's tenure as executive director, Logan International Airport was transformed into a modern facility. Upgrades were made to the runways and terminals, and the Volpe International Terminal (Terminal E) was built. Under King's watch, the authority went from a deficit to a surplus. However, he was criticized for ignoring the wishes of East Boston residents during airport expansion projects. His 1969 authorization of the destruction of Frederick Law Olmsted's Wood Island Park by bulldozers and chainsaws while the city was still challenging the taking of the parkland in court solidified the public's animosity. His critics also claim that the airport's success was not due to King, but due to the success of the jet age. Massport also became known for providing legislators with jobs for their constituents, gifts, and no-bid contracts.

King was also responsible for initiating ferry service to Hingham with the intention of revitalizing the Hingham Shipyard property.

King had a poor relationship with the Massachusetts Port Authority Board of Directors, who wanted him to consult with the board before he proceeded with the expansion of the airport and other projects. On November 21, 1974, the board voted 4 to 2 to fire King.

== New England Council ==
After his dismissal, King became president of the New England Council, a regional chamber of commerce-like organization funded by business interests. In this position he performed a variety of duties, including lobbying the federal government for legislation to limit environment restrictions on business and coordinating an attempt to have the national solar energy research center located in New England.

== Governor ==
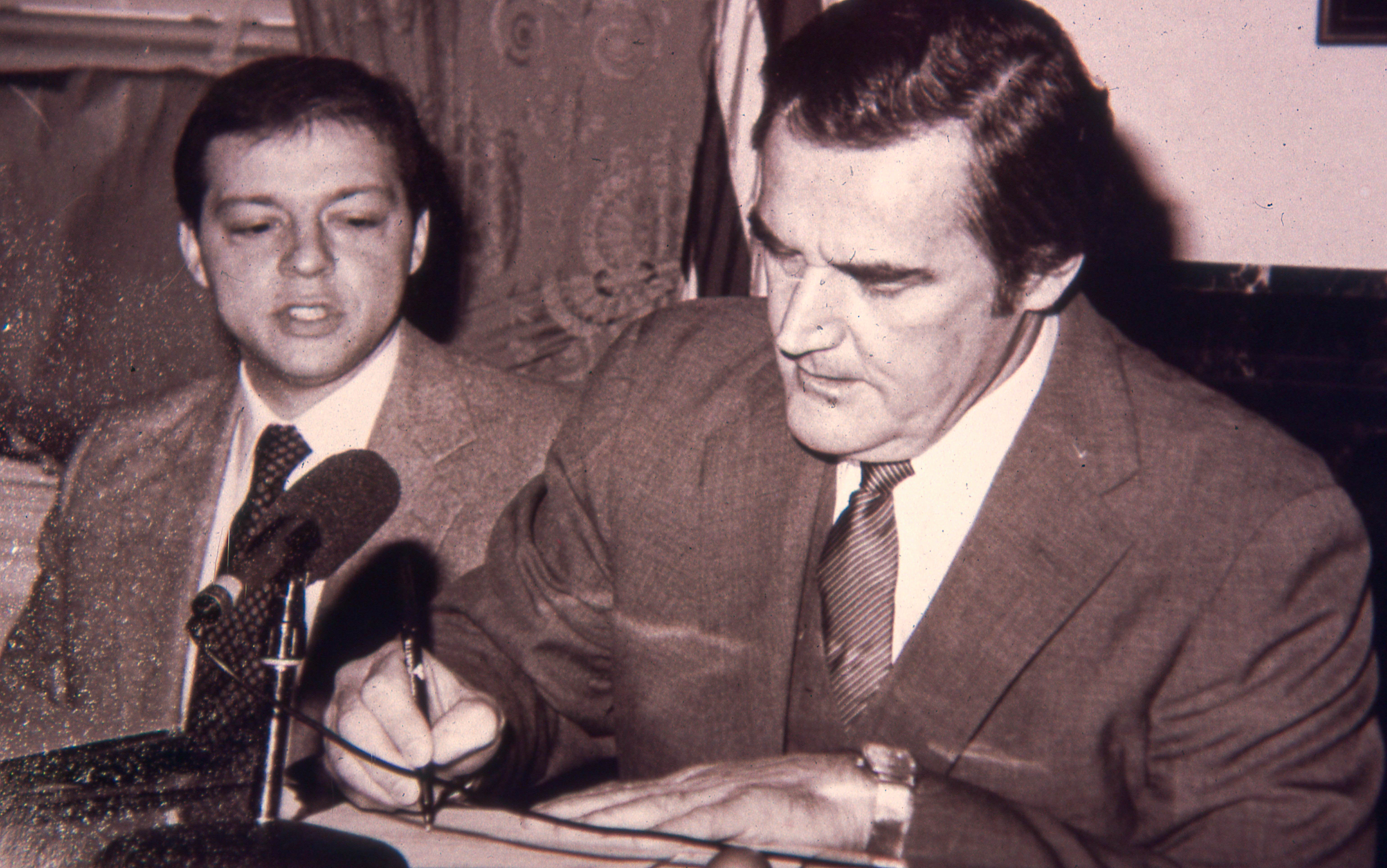
King with Anthony Cortese

On October 25, 1977, King announced that he would seek the Democratic nomination for Governor. A fiscal and social conservative, he ran as a pro-life candidate and supported capital punishment, offshore drilling, increased nuclear power, greater research on solar energy, less business regulation, raising the drinking age to 21, and mandatory sentences for drug dealers. King was able to raise more money than his opponents due to his support from the business community. He focused his spending on extensive media advertising while his main primary opponent, incumbent Governor Michael Dukakis, spent more money on organization.

In September 1978, King defeated Dukakis in the Democratic primary. He then went on to defeat a liberal Republican, Massachusetts House Minority Leader Francis W. Hatch Jr., in the November election.

During his term of office, King froze property taxes, reduced state spending on social programs, undertook a variety of efforts to encourage increased business and agricultural opportunities in the Commonwealth, introduced mandatory minimum sentences, and passed legislation to reintroduce the death penalty in Massachusetts, a measure which was later ruled unconstitutional by the state's Supreme Judicial Court. When advocating capital punishment, President Ronald Reagan called King his "favorite Democratic governor" and King endorsed Reagan in the 1984 presidential election.

=== Reelection campaign ===
In 1982, while King sought a second term as Governor of Massachusetts, charges of corruption in the Massachusetts Revenue Department hampered his campaign to win the Democratic primary against previous Governor Michael Dukakis. Dukakis won the Democratic non-binding endorsement at the State Democratic Convention in May. By June, a Boston Globe poll put Dukakis's support among likely Democratic primary voters at 68%, compared with King's 20%.

In June 1982, Massachusetts State tax examiner Stanley J. Barczak was arrested for accepting a bribe. Barczak made claims of widespread corruption and agreed to become an informer for Francis X. Bellotti, the state's Attorney General, in exchange for a suspended sentence without jail time. (Barczak's testimony led to the trials of two other people, but his claim of widespread corruption was never proven in court.)

Barczak had served a five-year prison term, beginning in 1953, for tax fraud committed shortly after working at the Internal Revenue Service's Pittsburgh office. He had worked for Governor King in his 1978 campaign. After that election he had sought a position in the King administration, and one of his letters requesting employment was initialed by King and forwarded to his appointments office. Records showed that in 1981 he had an appointment to meet with Barczak, though King could not recall whether this meeting took place. Barczak was hired in January 1981 as a tax examiner for the Lowell district office.

King had appointed one of his old high school friends, John F. Coady, as deputy revenue commissioner. On July 21, 1982, King was informed that Coady had been implicated in a grand jury investigation of the department. On July 30, Coady was found at his home dead by means of suicide from hanging; he had rehired Barczak in 1982, after budget cuts in 1981 had resulted in Barczak being let go.

Revenue Commissioner Joyce Hampers had initially refused to turn over the subpoenaed tax records of 3,000 individuals to the Attorney General for the grand jury. She cited state laws on privacy and characterized the investigation as "a fishing expedition". Gov. King worked out a compromise were the records of 195 individuals suspected of tax fraud would be turned over to the grand jury.

Hampers went on to insinuate that a nighttime break-in at her office (where some sensitive records had been stolen, but none connected to the investigation) had been ordered by his chief prosecutor Stephen Delinsky. She accused him of being motivated in his actions out of favoring Dukakis' campaign.

In response to Hampers unfounded accusations, Gov. King ordered her to stop making public statements. Delinsky charged that Hampers had tried to use state police to confiscate sensitive records held by Barczak (only prevented from doing so by the intervention of state troopers guarding him). Hampers responded saying she had only sent them to collect Barczak's revenue department credentials. Delinsky told reporters he would have the grand jury consider whether the incident was obstruction of justice and intimidation of a witness.

Hampers was also under media scrutiny for being forced, along with her physician and industrialist husband, to pay $16,818 plus interest in Federal back taxes when a court disallowed an elaborate tax shelter they had established.

The scandal hurt King's campaign just as it seemed he might gain on Dukakis due to a $1 million ad campaign boasting of his efforts to cut taxes and get tough on drunken drivers.

Dukakis, focusing on the charges of corruption in the Revenue Department and calling King a "cheerleader for Reaganomics", defeated the governor in the primaries and took the Democratic nomination.

== Post-political career ==
Following his term of office, Governor King joined the public relations firm of Hill & Knowlton. In 1985, he switched his party affiliation to the Republican Party and considered running for governor in 1986 on the Republican ticket. He endorsed George H. W. Bush during the 1988 presidential election. Until the time of his death he maintained residences in both Massachusetts and Florida.

His wife Josephine died in 1995. He had two sons, Timothy and Brian. His brother Paul was a judge in the Massachusetts court system.

King died in Burlington, Massachusetts, on September 18, 2006, from complications of a fall.

== Cabinet ==
The King Cabinet
OFFICE	NAME	TERM
Governor	Edward J. King	1979 – 1983
Lt. Governor	Thomas P. O'Neill III	1979 – 1983
Secretary of Transportation	Barry Locke; James Carlin (politician)	1979 – 1981; 1981 – 1983
Secretary of Communities and Development	Byron J. Matthews	1979 – 1983
Secretary of Environmental Affairs	John A. Bewick	1979 – 1983
Secretary of Consumer Affairs	Eileen Schell	1979 – 1983
Secretary of Human Services	Charles F. Mahoney; William T. Hogan	1979 – 1981; 1981 – 1983
Secretary of Elder Affairs	Stephen Guptill; Thomas H. D. Mahoney	1979 – 1979; 1979 – 1983
Secretary of Administration and Finance	Edward Hanley; David M. Bartley	1979 – 1981; 1981 – 1983
Secretary of Public Safety	George Luciano	1979 – 1983
Secretary of Economic Affairs	George Kariotis	1979 – 1983
Secretary of Energy	Joseph S. Fitzpatrick; Margaret St. Clair	1979 – 1981; 1981 – 1983

Party political offices
Preceded by Michael Dukakis	Massachusetts Democratic Party gubernatorial candidate 1978 (won)	Succeeded by Michael Dukakis
Political offices
Preceded by Michael Dukakis	Governor of Massachusetts; January 4, 1979 – January 6, 1983	Succeeded by Michael Dukakis
