= Michael Dukakis 1988 presidential campaign =

American political campaign

Michael Dukakis for President 1988
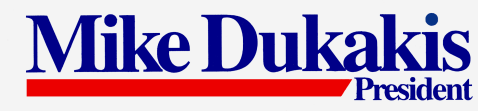
- Campaign: 1988 Democratic primaries 1988 U.S. presidential election
- Candidate: Michael Dukakis; 65th and 67th Governor of Massachusetts (1975–1979, 1983–1991); Lloyd Bentsen; U.S. Senator from Texas (1971–1993)
- Affiliation: Democratic Party
- Status: Announced: March 16, 1987; Presumptive nominee June 7, 1988; Official nominee July 21, 1988; Lost election: November 8, 1988
- Headquarters: Boston
- Key people: Susan Estrich (campaign manager); Paul Brountas (campaign chair); John Sasso (campaign manager; resigned on October 1, 1987; returned as vice chairman on September 3, 1988); Paul Tully (political director; resigned on October 1, 1987); Donna Brazile (deputy field director; resigned on October 20, 1988)
- Slogan(s): We're on your side Good jobs at good wages Because the Best America has yet to Come
- Theme song: "America" by Neil Diamond

The 1988 presidential campaign of Michael Dukakis began when he announced his candidacy for the Democratic Party's nomination for President of the United States on March 16, 1987, in a speech in Boston. After winning the nomination, he was formally selected as the Democratic Party's nominee at the party's convention in Atlanta on July 21, 1988. He lost the 1988 election to his Republican opponent George H. W. Bush, who was the sitting Vice President at the time. Dukakis won 10 states and the District of Columbia, receiving a total of 111 electoral votes compared to Bush's 426 (Dukakis would have received 112, but one faithless elector who was pledged to him voted for Lloyd Bentsen for president and Dukakis for vice president instead out of protest). Dukakis received 45% of the popular vote to Bush's 53%. Many commentators blamed Dukakis' loss on the embarrassing photograph of him in a tank taken on September 13, 1988, which subsequently formed the basis of a successful Republican attack ad. Much of the blame was also laid on Dukakis' campaign, which was criticized for being poorly managed despite being well funded.

Had Dukakis been elected, he would have been the first Greek American president, the first Eastern Orthodox president, the first Eastern European American president, the second governor of Massachusetts to accomplish this feat (after Calvin Coolidge), and the first incumbent state governor to do so since Franklin D. Roosevelt in 1932. This feat would be accomplished four years later by Bill Clinton. Dukakis also would have been the fifth president from Massachusetts. Bentsen would have been the second senator from Texas to be elected vice president, after Lyndon B. Johnson.

== Background ==
Michael Dukakis was the 65th and 67th governor of Massachusetts, from 1975 to 1979 and 1983 to 1991. His running mate, Lloyd Bentsen, was a U.S. senator from Texas, and a member of the United States Senate Committee on Finance who had previously run for the Democratic nomination in 1976.

== Initial announcement ==
On March 16, 1987, Dukakis, then the Governor of Massachusetts, gave what has become known as the "Marathon Speech" in Boston in which he hinted that he was running for president in next year's election. He formally announced that he would run in a speech given the following month. Previously, he had been urged to consider running for president by Mario Cuomo, who had dropped out the previous month. This made him the third declared Democratic candidate for the 1988 election, after Richard A. Gephardt and Bruce Babbitt. Dukakis soon received an outpouring of support from voters throughout the country, which reportedly resulted in him receiving more attention than even he had expected.

== Democratic primaries ==
By May 1988, Dukakis had become the Democratic Party's front-runner for their nomination in that year's election, thanks to his victories in the New York and Pennsylvania primaries. On June 7, 1988, Dukakis clinched the Democratic Party's nomination by winning all four of the party's last primaries against Jesse Jackson, the only other remaining Democratic candidate at the time. These victories gave Dukakis significantly more delegates than the 2,081 required to win the nomination.

== Endorsements ==
List of Michael Dukakis 1988 presidential campaign endorsements

Celebrities

- Karen Allen, actress
- Woody Allen, filmmaker
- Teri Austin, actress
- Lauren Bacall, actress
- Doug Barr, actor
- Jeff Berg, actor
- Rubén Blades, musician
- Peter Boyle, actor
- Cher, singer
- John Davis, producer
- Michael Douglas, actor
- Richard Dreyfuss, actor
- Griffin Dunne, actor
- Mia Farrow, actress
- Sally Field, actress
- Carrie Fisher, actress
- Jane Fonda, actress
- Art Garfunkel, singer
- Richard Gere, actor
- Harry Hamlin, actor
- Arthur Hiller, director
- Don Johnson, actor
- Joanna Kerns, actress
- John Lithgow, actor
- Rob Lowe, actor
- Leonard Nimoy, actor
- Ken Olin, actor
- Elizabeth Perkins, actress
- Sydney Pollack, director
- Alan Rachins, actor
- Tony Randall, actor
- John Ratzenberger, actor
- Judge Reinhold, actor
- Telly Savalas, actor
- Cybill Shepherd, actress
- Carly Simon, singer
- Paul Simon, singer
- Sissy Spacek, actress
- Maureen Stapleton, actress
- Oliver Stone, director
- Meryl Streep, actress
- James Taylor, singer
- Christopher Walken, actor
- Raquel Welch, actress
- Patricia Wettig, actress
- Bruce Willis, actor
- Shelley Winters, actress
- Moon Unit Zappa, actress

Individuals

- Barry Diller, businessman
- Tom Hayden, activist

== "Massachusetts Miracle" ==
Dukakis' campaign was focused on his experience as Governor of Massachusetts, during which time Massachusetts had emerged from an economic depression and had become a "bastion of prosperity and full employment". Commentators had described this as the "Massachusetts Miracle", a claim Bush dismissed as the "Massachusetts mirage".

== Running mate selection ==
On July 12, 1988, Dukakis announced he had chosen Texas senator Lloyd Bentsen as his running mate, in the hopes of garnering more support in the South. Dukakis compared his pick to John F. Kennedy's pick of Lyndon B. Johnson as his running mate in the 1960 election. As a result, his ticket became known as the "Boston-Austin axis", as Bentsen himself described it. Shortly after Dukakis made the pick, a Time cover story dubbed Dukakis and Bentsen "the odd couple", and Richard Stengel noted in 1988 that Bentsen was "...more Bush's twin than Dukakis'". James J. Kilpatrick called the pair "The Sominex Twins".

== Acceptance of the nomination ==
After winning the primaries in 30 states against Jesse Jackson and Al Gore, Dukakis accepted the Democratic Party's nomination at the 1988 Democratic National Convention on July 21, 1988, where governor of Arkansas Bill Clinton formally nominated Dukakis.

== Television advertising ==
During the campaign, Dukakis was the target of several now-infamous attack ads by individuals supporting the Bush campaign, most infamously the "Willie Horton" ad produced by the pro-Bush National Security Political Action Committee. Although the Bush campaign disavowed the ad, it still played a major role in Dukakis' defeat. The Dukakis campaign was mired in confusion during the general election, as exemplified by "the Handlers", a series of unintentionally confusing commercials that the campaign produced and aired at a cost of $3 million. Dukakis also erred in not responding to the Horton attack until late in the campaign.

== Donna Brazile resignation ==
On October 20, 1988, Donna Brazile resigned from her role as deputy field director for the Dukakis campaign after saying that Bush needed to "fess up" about a rumor that he had had an extramarital affair. Her comments were also disavowed by the campaign, and Dukakis personally apologized to Bush for them at the Alfred E. Smith Memorial Foundation Dinner that year.

== Polling ==
A poll conducted on July 21 and 22 of 1988 found that Dukakis had expanded the size of his lead over Bush to 17 points, with 55% of voters surveyed saying they would prefer Dukakis to win, compared to 38% for Bush. His lead soon began to shrink, however. For example, on July 30, Dukakis criticized the Reagan administration's handling of ethical issues, to which Ronald Reagan himself responded by describing Dukakis as an "invalid", after which his poll numbers dropped by 5 points overnight. By August 11, Dukakis' lead over Bush had shrunk to 7 points, and by August 24, Bush had gained a 4-point lead over Dukakis. Of the dramatic shift in Dukakis' poll numbers, Mervin Field said, "I have never seen anything like this, this kind of swing in favorability ratings, ever since I have seen polls, going back to 1936." Later that year, after the second Bush-Dukakis debate occurred on October 13, Dukakis' numbers dropped by 7 points that night, largely due to his response to a question about whether he would support the death penalty for someone if they raped and murdered his wife, Kitty Dukakis, being perceived as emotionless by voters (although others considered the question inherently unfair).

== Transition planning ==
A presidential transition was contingently planned from Reagan to Dukakis.

Dukakis' transition planning efforts' activities were largely undertaken in secrecy. In September 1988, awareness arose of active transition planning when the campaign filed paperwork to establish a Massachusetts nonprofit corporation named "Dukakis Transition '88".

The transition planning was formally chaired by campaign chairman Paul Brountas. However, Marcia Hale was overseeing much of the effort out of an office in Boston. One of the individuals involved in the transition planning was Harrison Wellford, who had been involved in the pre-election transition planning of Jimmy Carter in 1976, and would later go on to play a role in the presidential transition of Bill Clinton.

In September, campaign spokesman Mark Gearan stated, "It's a very quiet operation housed separately from the campaign.

Despite having a pre-election transition planning effort of their own, the Bush campaign took a shot at Dukakis for having a transition effort, with Bush spokesperson Mark Goodin remarking, "As usual, they have the cart before the horse. If they spend less time planning for transition and more time campaigning, they would not be behind in the polls. Our position is you need to win the election before you worry about the transition."

If Dukakis had won, he would not only have participated in a presidential transition, but also a gubernatorial transition –as he would have transitioned out of the Massachusetts governorship and handed over that position to his lieutenant governor Evelyn Murphy. Had he won, he would have been the first sitting governor to transition into the presidency since Franklin D. Roosevelt was elected in 1932.
