= Rosabeth Moss Kanter =

American sociologist (born 1943)

- Born: Rosabeth Moss; March 15, 1943 (age 83); Cleveland, Ohio, US
- Other name: Rosabeth M. Kanter
- Occupations: Scholar; management consultant
- Spouses: Stuart A. Kanter (died 1969); Barry Stein (died 2023) (m. 1972)

Academic background
- Education: Bryn Mawr College; University of Michigan
- Thesis: Utopia (1967)
- Influences: C. Wright Mills

Academic work
- Discipline: Business studies; sociology
- Institutions: Brandeis University; Yale University; Harvard University
- Main interests: Tokenism

Rosabeth Moss Kanter (born March 15, 1943) is an American sociologist who is a professor of business at Harvard Business School. She co-founded the Harvard University Advanced Leadership Initiative and served as Director and Founding Chair from 2008 to 2018. She was the top-ranking woman—No. 11 overall—in a 2002 study of Top Business Intellectuals by citation in several sources. She was named one of the "50 most powerful women in Boston" by Boston Magazine and named one of "125 women who changed our world" over the past 125 years by Good Housekeeping magazine in May 2010.

== Early life ==
Rosabeth Moss was born in Cleveland, Ohio, to Helen (Smolen) Moss, a schoolteacher, and Nelson Nathan Moss, a lawyer and small-business owner. She has a younger sister, Myra. Kanter described her childhood as "benign" and herself as ambitious, having written a novel and entered essay contests as early as 11 years old.

== Education ==
Kanter graduated from Cleveland Heights High School in 1960 and then went on to study sociology and English literature at Bryn Mawr College, graduating magna cum laude in 1964. The following year she received an MA in sociology and, in 1967, a PhD from the University of Michigan. Her dissertation was on 19th-century utopian communes. Although Kanter later decided to pursue a career in business research, her training as a sociologist informed her thinking and subsequent work.

== Career ==
Kanter was assistant professor of sociology at Brandeis University from 1967 to 1973 and again from 1974 to 1977, visiting associate professor of administration at Harvard University, as well as professor of sociology at Yale University from 1977 to 1986. She served as editor of the Harvard Business Review from 1989 to 1992, the last academic to hold the job. She is chair and director of the Harvard University Advanced Leadership Initiative.

Kanter's earliest work as a sociologist focused on utopian communities and communes in the United States. In her 1972 book, Commitment & Community: Communes and Utopias in Sociological Perspective, she argued that the internal characteristics of a utopian community lead to its success or failure. Kanter defined a "successful" commune as one that lasted for longer than thirty-three years. After surveying ninety-one communal projects from the period between 1780 and 1860, she determined that communal groups such as the Shakers, Amana, and Oneida were among the most successful nineteenth-century communes. To explain their success, Kanter noted these groups' rituals and clear boundaries for membership, as well as the "commitment mechanisms" that utopians utilized: sacrifice, investment, renunciation, communion, mortification and transcendence. She concluded that the more that a utopian community asked of its members, the more cohesive and long-lasting it was.

Kanter has written numerous books on business management techniques, particularly change management; she also has a regular column in the Miami Herald.

She is known for her 1977 study of tokenism—how being a minority in a group can affect one's performance due to enhanced visibility and performance pressure. Her development of the concept of tokenism has greatly impacted work on minority experiences in the workplace, the paper has been cited 1,945 times. Her book Men and Women of the Corporation is a classic in critical management studies, bureaucracy analysis and gender studies.

Kanter was an economic adviser to Michael Dukakis in his 1988 bid for presidency. Together they wrote a book entitled Creating the future: the Massachusetts comeback and its promise for America, an examination of the Massachusetts Miracle.

She co-founded the Harvard University-wide Advanced Leadership Initiative, guiding its planning from 2005 to its launch in 2008 and serving as Founding Chair and Director from 2008-2018 as it became a growing international model for a new stage of higher education preparing successful top leaders to apply their skills to national and global challenges.

Kanter co-founded the consulting firm Goodmeasure Inc. and has served as chair since 1980. She advises CEOs of companies and has served on various business and non-profit boards. Her consulting clients have included large companies such as IBM, Gap Inc., Monsanto, British Airways, and Volvo. Kanter has spoken in national and international events along with Presidents, Prime Ministers and CEOs. Her main focus is speaking out on addressing educational dilemmas.

== Management theory ==
Kanter's theory of management suggests the manner by which a company operates influences attitudes of the work force. Kanter says employees show a variety of behaviors depending on whether structural support is in position. Her view is power emanates from informal and formal sources. Employees must have access to available resources to accomplish the organization's objectives. It is also essential to promote the staff's skills and comprehension.

A July 2016 article in Management Today cited Kanter as "probably the first woman to attain indisputable management guru status." Kanter has interests in corporate strategies, self-confidence, and demographic shift. She has a fondness for conducting detailed research therefore earning the pseudonym, "The Thinking Woman's Michael Porter".

An article published in the San Diego Tribune on May 29, 2018, mentioned Kanter's idea that the happiest employees can solve the most difficult problems and make a positive change in the lives of people. In an interview with Business Insider in 2015, Kanter deplored the "miserable state of America's infrastructure which impaired the economy and affected American citizens."

== Awards ==
- Guggenheim Fellowship (1975)
- First honorary degree awarded in 1978 by Yale University
- The Harvard Business Review's McKinsey (1979)
- C. Wright Mills Award (1977) for her book Men and Women of the Corporation, the year's outstanding book on social issues.
- Academy of Management's Distinguished Career Award, Academy of Management (2001)
- Intelligent Community Visionary of the Year Award, World Teleport Association (2002)
- Honorary Doctor of Social Science degree from Aalborg University in Denmark. (2008)
- Holds 23 honorary degrees from various colleges and universities.

The Rosabeth Moss Kanter Award is given in recognition of the best piece of work-family research. The award was created by the Center for Families at Purdue University and the Center for Work and Family at Boston College in honor of Kanter.

== Personal life ==
Kanter's first husband, Stuart A. Kanter, whom she had married in her junior year at Bryn Mawr, died in 1969. She married consultant Barry Stein in 1972; he died in 2023. Together they have one son.

== Publications ==
=== Books ===
- Move: How to Rebuild and Reinvent America's Infrastructure
- SuperCorp: How Vanguard Companies create Innovation, Profits, Growth, and Social Good, named 10 best business books of 2009 by Amazon.com
- Confidence: How winning Streaks & Losing Streaks Begin & End, New York Times Business and #1 Business Week bestseller. A new theory of Confidence within people in leadership positions who continually succeed or fail.
- Men & Women of the Corporation, won the C. Wright Mills award
- Work & Family in the United States
- When Giants Learn to Dance
- The Change Masters, 20th century, most influential business books. Organizational structure view of the most important companies in America.
- Think Outside the Building: How Advanced Leaders Can Change the World One Smart Innovation at a Time.

=== Selected bibliography ===
- Kanter, Rosabeth Moss (1972). Commitment and community: communes and utopias in sociological perspective. Harvard University Press. ISBN 978-0-674-14576-4.
- Kanter, Rosabeth Moss (March 1977). "Some effects of proportions on group life: skewed sex ratios and responses to token women". American Journal of Sociology. 82 (5): 965–990 for the University of Chicago Press. doi:10.1086/226425. JSTOR 2777808. S2CID 144140263. Pdf from Norges Handelshøyskole (NHH), the Norwegian School of Economics.
- Kanter, Rosabeth Moss (1993) [1977]. Men and women of the corporation (2nd ed.). New York: Basic Books. ISBN 9780465044542.
- Kanter, Rosabeth Moss (1984). The change masters: innovation and entrepreneurship in the American corporation. Simon and Schuster. ISBN 978-0-671-52800-3.
- Kanter, Rosabeth Moss; Stein, Barry A. (June 1986). A tale of "O": on being different in an organization. Harper & Row. ISBN 978-0-06-132064-4.
- Kanter, Rosabeth Moss (1 January 1995). World Class: Thriving Locally in the Global Economy. Simon & Schuster. ISBN 978-0684811291.
- Kanter, Rosabeth Moss (4 August 2008). Men and Women of the Corporation. PublicAffairs. ISBN 978-0-7867-2384-3.
- Kanter, Rosabeth Moss (1 October 2010). SuperCorp: How Vanguard Companies Create Innovation, Profits, Growth, and Social Good. Profile Books. ISBN 978-1-84765-229-4.
- Kanter, Rosabeth Moss (14 June 2011). "Innovation: the classic traps". Harvard Business Review on Inspiring and Executing Innovation. Harvard Business Press. pp. 149–181. ISBN 978-1-4221-6261-3.
- Kanter, Rosabeth Moss (2015). Move: Putting America's Infrastructure Back in the Lead. W. W. Norton & Company. ISBN 978-0-393-24680-3.
- Kanter, Rosabeth Moss (28 January 2020). Think Outside the Building: How Advanced Leaders Can Change the World One Smart Innovation at a Time. Public Affairs ISBN 978-1541742710.
