= Worcester faction =

Faction of the Genovese crime family

Genovese Crime Family's Worcester Faction
- Founded: 1920s
- Founder: Genovese crime family
- Founding location: Worcester, Massachusetts, United States
- Years active: 1920s–2009
- Territory: Worcester
- Ethnicity: Italians as "made men" and other ethnicities as associates
- Activities: Racketeering, conspiracy, loansharking, money laundering, murder, gambling, and extortion
- Allies: Patriarca crime family

The Worcester faction of the Genovese crime family was a group of Italian-American mobsters who controlled organized crime activities in the Worcester, Massachusetts area. The Worcester faction was led by a caporegime who oversaw illegal activities in racketeering, illegal gambling, loansharking and extortion.

== History ==
Worcester, Massachusetts, was home to a faction of the Genovese Crime Family in the early 1920s, founded by Frank Iaconi. Their first rackets were during Prohibition and having their headquarters based in the "Little Italy" of Worcester, Shrewsbury Street. Notably, the Worcester Faction was low-key, not attracting much law enforcement attention throughout its existence and information about the crew was scarce due to their limited bloodshed and violence, which was well received by the top brass in New York City.

In 1950, Frank Iacone was brought before the Kefauver Committee and questioned about how he made his living, which led to an investigation of his tax returns. Iaconi generated $350,000 through racketeering and money laundering, owing a total of $217,875 in back taxes. In February 1953, Iaconi pled guilty to income tax evasion and received 15 months at the Federal Penitentiary, in Danbury Connecticut, he served 11 months of his sentence. Frank Iaconi passed away on July 14, 1956, 11 months after his release, he was 61 years old. His two sons Chester and Sully remained in the Worcester crew by then taken over by Carlo Mastrototaro. While Mastrototaro nominally answered to Genovese bosses in New York, his position also required tacit approval from New England crime leaders, particularly during the era of Patriarca family boss Raymond L. S. Patriarca, who forged territorial agreements dividing New England and New York family interests along geographic lines.

== Operation Big League & RICO Indictments ==
Under Mastrototaro, the Worcester crew engaged in the traditional rackets of the American Mafia, including illegal gambling, racketeering, and fraud. In 1971, he was convicted in federal court of aiding the transport of stolen U.S. Treasury bills; Patriarca family associate Vincent Teresa testified against him in exchange for leniency. Teresa later described Mastrototaro as “the boss of Worcester” and among the prominent crime figures in New England. In 1980–1981, Mastrototaro became a central figure in Operation Big League, a coordinated law enforcement investigation targeting organized crime figures in Worcester and surrounding areas. The investigation—which used electronic surveillance and multi-agency cooperation—uncovered illegal gambling operations, a pornography racket, theft of pornographic materials, and other offenses.

A particularly notable episode was the pornography business dispute involving Mastrototaro and Gennaro Angiulo. Mastrototaro co-owned United Books in Worcester with Angiulo; in 1980 he sought permission from Genovese bosses in New York to open a second porn shop, the Green Street News & Smoke Shop, which led to conflict with Angiulo's territory and sparked broader Mafia disputes. The business was ultimately shuttered as part of federal cases and inter-family negotiations.

== Demise ==
Following most members passing away and Carlo Mastrototaro's own death in 2009, The Worcester crew was noted as defunct by law enforcement. In 2026, Reputed mob figure and lasting remnant Michael "Mike" Frisoli had been charged with various sex crimes in Central Massachusetts. Frisoli had previously been arrested for Stolen Valor in 2010.

=== Caporegimes ===
- 1925-1953: Frank Iaconi
- 1953-2009: Carlo Mastrototaro

=== Soldiers ===
- Angelo "Chester" Iaconi
- Salvatore "Sully" Iaconi
- James "Jimmy" Collaro
- Cosmo "Pinky" Panarelli
- Thomas "Champ" Sanfratello
- Francis "Frank" Santo

== Associates ==
- Michael "Mike" Frisoli
- Joseph "Joe" Pizzillo
