= Greg Hyatt =

American politician

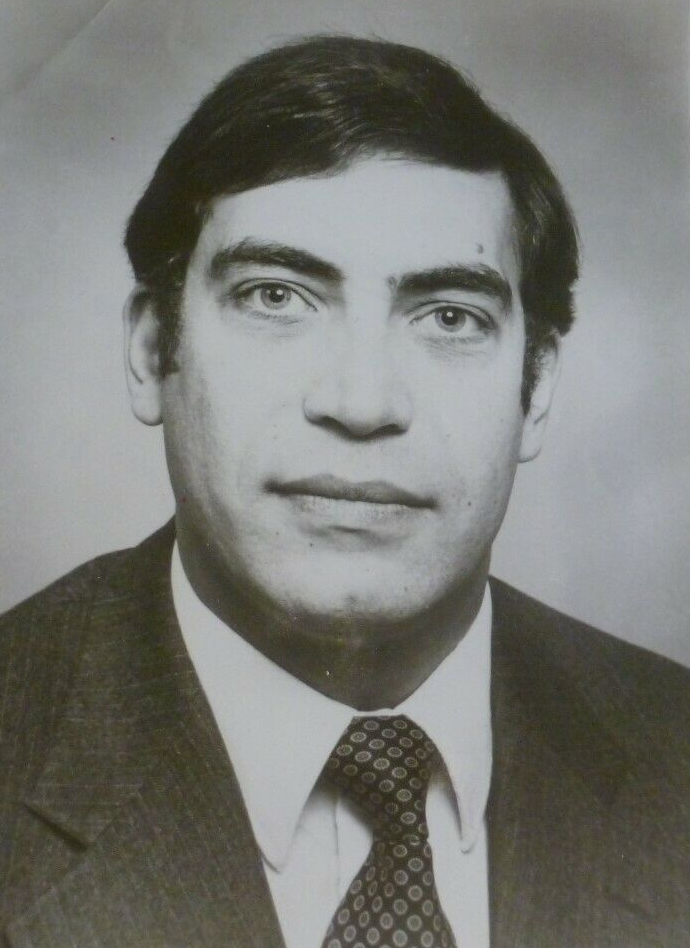
- Born: Gregory Sol Hyatt; September 6, 1953; Methuen, Massachusetts, U.S.
- Died: March 8, 2024 (aged 70)
- Education: Yale University; Boston College (JD)
- Occupations: Lawyer, Politician
- Political party: Democratic (1992-2024); Republican (Until 1992)

Gregory Sol Hyatt (September 6, 1953 – March 8, 2024) was an American political activist and a former attorney and politician. He was a candidate for Governor of Massachusetts in 1986, but dropped out of the race due to allegations of forging names on his nomination papers, having ties to organized crime, and erratic personal behavior.

== Early life and political involvement ==
Hyatt was born and raised in Methuen, Massachusetts. His father was a local doctor. In 1971 he graduated from Central Catholic High School in Lawrence, Massachusetts. He was class valedictorian. Hyatt attended Yale University, where he was a member of the Yale Debate Association and the floor leader of the Party of the Right in the Yale Political Union. In 1979 he graduated from Boston College Law School and began practicing law.

== Proposition 2½ ==
Hyatt served as executive director of Citizens for Limited Taxation from 1979 to 1980. He was one of the architects of Proposition 2½, a ballot measure that limits property tax increases by Massachusetts municipalities and traveled the state to drum up support for the measure. During the Reagan administration, Hyatt worked in the Department of Education and the Small Business Administration.

== 1984 congressional race ==
Hyatt's political career began in 1984 when he was a candidate for the 5th congressional district. He defeated Thomas P. Tierney for the Republican nomination and faced Democratic State Senator Chester G. Atkins in the general election. In a heavily Democratic district, Hyatt was able to finish a close second to Atkins.

== Anti-seat belt law activism ==
In 1985, Hyatt, along with radio host Jerry Williams, led the effort to gather signatures to place a measure to repeal Massachusetts' mandatory seat belt law on the 1986 ballot. The question made it to the ballot and would be passed by the voters.

== 1986 gubernatorial election ==
On March 13, 1986, Hyatt became the first Republican to enter the gubernatorial race.

Hyatt ran on a platform of limiting state taxes, bringing back the death penalty, providing state aid to private schools, and competency testing and merit pay for teachers. He opposed the state law that made wearing a seat belt mandatory, the use of roadblocks to crack down on drunken driving, busing, and the use of public funds for abortions.

Shortly before the Republican convention in April 1986, Associated Builders and Contractors, a group of Massachusetts builders and contractors that had hired Hyatt as a consultant on a petition drive, announced that they had fired him for ineffectuality and erratic behavior, including staring off into space, heavy coffee drinking, talking on the phone when no one was on the other end, and twice appearing naked before a secretary in his office.

At the convention, Hyatt was challenged by former Metropolitan District Commissioner Guy Carbone, and state representative Royall H. Switzler, who was drafted at the convention by anti-Hyatt Republicans. After a strong showing for Switzler on the first ballot (891 votes for Hyatt, 775 votes for Switzler, 258 votes for Carbone), some of Hyatt's major supporters, including Ray Shamie and Papa Gino's founder Michael Valerio, announced that they would not oppose Switzler's nomination. On the second ballot, Switzler won the nomination with 975 votes to Hyatt's 876 and Carbone's 60. Despite losing the nomination, Hyatt chose to stay in the race and run against Switzler in the Republican primary.

During the campaign, Hyatt and his aides were investigated by the Massachusetts Attorney General's office on charges for forging names on his nomination papers. He was also recorded discussing politics and accepting a cash gift from New England mobster George Kattar on a Federal Bureau of Investigation wiretap. Charges were not brought against him in either case.

In June, Switzler dropped out of the race after inaccuracies about his military record were revealed, leaving Hyatt the only Republican candidate for Governor.

On July 14, Hyatt dropped out of the race. Despite dropping out, Hyatt won the Republican primary. He declined the nomination and write-in candidate George Kariotis was declared the nominee. Hyatt later stated he declined the nomination because Valerio and former Governor John A. Volpe promised to retire his campaign debts in exchange for not accepting the party's nomination, which they never followed up on. Ann Kramer, a Republican State Committee member who was at the meeting with Hyatt, Valerio, Volpe, and other party leaders stated that they agreed to help Hyatt raise money to help him repay his debt, but did not promise to retire it entirely.

== Later life ==
In November 1989, Hyatt gave his first interview after dropping out of the election. Hyatt described himself as still being in a "state of emotional shock" and feeling "gypped and violated". At the time of the interview he had been unable to find work for several months, was living off of a stipend provided to him by his father, going through a divorce, and undergoing psychological counseling. Since the election, Hyatt had gained 35 pounds and grew a mustache.

That same year, Hyatt sued Associated Builders and Contractors and its former executive Stephen Tocco for slander. During the suit it was revealed that Hyatt's psychiatrist had described him as having narcissistic personality disorder and having been in "hypomanic stages." Most of his defamation suit was dismissed, however the court allowed Hyatt's charge that Associated Builders had defamed him by claiming he had been fired stand (Hyatt contended that he was not fired, but quit). In September 1993, the case was settled out of court.

In 1992, Hyatt changed his voter registration to Democrat so he could vote for Paul Tsongas in the Democratic presidential primary. He also voted for Marty Meehan in that year's United States House of Representatives election. While he described himself as "still basically a conservative" he also stated that he "believe[d] societies should be judged by how they treat their less fortunate".

In 1992, Hyatt was elected to the Methuen Charter Commission. In 1993 and 2003, he was an unsuccessful candidate for Mayor of Methuen.

Hyatt ran a website, thebulldogedition.com, where he wrote about politics in Massachusetts and Methuen. The site was described by Boston Globe columnist Alex Beam as "belligerent" and "off-the-wall". A portion of the website had to be taken down due to a judge's order. As he did not have a computer, Hyatt updated the site from the Nevins Memorial Library in Methuen. In a 2005 Boston Globe column, Hyatt was described as occasionally working as a political or media consultant, on probation for making hostile threats, not having a car or computer, being in poor health, and described his living situation by stating "I bounce around". Hyatt said that he saw himself as a good candidate to host a talk show. He also stated that he rekindled his religious faith.

He later moved to Amesbury, Massachusetts. In 2007, he was a leader in the effort to get Proposition 1, a proposed initiative petition that would which would cap increases in property tax levies to 1% a year and eliminate the auto excise tax, on the ballot. On September 26, 2007, he was disbarred by the Board of Bar Overseers for "serious crimes", including intimidation of a witness and violating a protective order. Hyatt maintained his innocence and stated that he had only pleaded guilty because he did not have enough money to fight the charges in court. He had not practiced law since 2000, when he stopped paying his bar association dues.

Preceded by Don Feder	Executive Director of Citizens for Limited Taxation; 1979 – 1980	Succeeded by Barbara Anderson
