= John Conte =

John Conte may refer to:

- John Conte (politician) (born 1930), American politician in Massachusetts
- John Conte (actor) (1915–2006), American actor and television station owner
