= Senator D'Amico =

Senator D'Amico may refer to:

- Gerard D'Amico (born 1947), Massachusetts State Senate
- John D'Amico Jr. (born 1941), New Jersey State Senate
