= Iaconi =

Iaconi is an Italian surname. Notable people with the surname include:

- Frank Iaconi (c. 1895–1956), American mobster
- Ivo Iaconi (born 1956), Italian footballer and manager
- Cristi Iaconi (born 1994), Romanian Architect

== See also ==
- Iacone
