= Carlo Mastrototaro =

Italian-American mobster

Carlo Mastrototaro (1920– October 5, 2009) was an Italian-American gangster who served as a capo with the Genovese crime family, which was affiliated with the Patriarca crime family. Mastototaro reigned as local crime boss of Worcester faction for half-a-century.

During his reign as the boss of New England organized crime, Raymond L.S. Patriarca (Il Patrone) formed strong relationships with the New York City families particularly the Colombo. Il Patrone worked with the Genovese family and decided that dividing line between the New York families and his family would be the Connecticut River. The New England crime family would control organized crime in Worcester (which the Genovese family wound up holding as a fiefdom) and Boston, as well as the state of Maine, while the Genovese family would control organized crime in Hartford, Springfield, and Albany.

== World War II Service ==
A native of Worcester and a World War II vet, Mastrototaro joined the United States Marine Corps in 1939 and won the Silver Star and for bravery and a Purple Heart for being wounded during the Battle of Saipan. He was mustered out of the Marines in 1944. His unit was virtually wiped out in the Battle of Iwo Jima. He later was a founder of the Worcester chapter of the Marine Corps League.

== Genovese Family Caporegime ==
Nominally a restaurateur, Mastrototaro became a made-man of the Mafia's Genovese family, rising from soldier to caporegime. He served as boss of Worcester, part of the Patriarca family's territory, with their approval, but he answered to New York.

Mastrototaro took over from Frank Iaconi, the boss of Worcester's organized crime scene since Prohibition days, after he ran afoul of the Kefauver Committee investigating organized crime. Iaconi's testimony before the committee in 1950 led to Committee Chairman Estes Kefauver have Iaconi's tax returns examined, which led to an Internal Revenue Service investigation of Iaconi. In February 1953, Iaconi was indicted for failing to pay $217,875 in taxes on $350,000 in revenue from racketeering and for money laundering. After pleading guilty, he was imprisoned at Danbury Federal Prison for 11 months. He died from natural causes soon after being released.

== First Arrest ==
As a result of his criminal activities, Mastrotaro was arrested and convicted of gambling, racketeering, and wire fraud, among other charges. In 1971, he was convicted of abetting the transporting of stolen U.S. Treasury bills on the testimony of Vincent "Big Vinnie" Teresa, a Patriarca family associate. Teresa testified against Mastrototaro in return for a lighter sentence and a place in the federal witness protection program.

In Teresa's autobiography, My Life in the Mafia, Mastrototaro was described as "the boss of Worcester" and "the fourth most powerful" crime boss in New England. Teresa linked Mastrototaro to Meyer Lansky and gambling in pre-Castro Cuba. Teresa wrote about Mastrototaros' character:

He was as honest as they come in the mob when you dealt with him," Mr. Teresa wrote. "If you had a cent and half coming from him, it didn't make a bit of difference if you didn't show up to collect for six months. When you got there, the money was there waiting for you.

== Struggle Over Territory & RICO Arrest ==
In 1980, Mastrototaro was the co-owner of a pornographic bookstore in Worcester with Gennaro "Jerry" Angiulo, the Boston-based underboss of the Patriarca family. In November of that year, he decided to launch a competing business. Mastrototaro had permission from New York, but he did not consult Angiulo or Thomas A. Palladino, the manager of the first store, United Books.

The new store, Green Street News & Smoke Shop, was managed by a man with ties to the Gambino crime family, which supplied the store with pornography. The new store led to a bitter dispute with Angiulo and sent shockwaves through the New England criminal underground. Mastrototaro had violated the rule by which a competing family had to get the permission of the family that controlled the territory, in this case the Patriarca's, before going into business.

At the time of the dispute, Worcester County District Attorney John Conte, in league with federal and state law enforcement officials, had launched "Operation Big League" against Mastrototaro and other organized crime figures in Worcester. Starting in October 1980, the investigation used electronic surveillance to get the goods on the gangsters.

The dispute had to be mediated at the top levels of the three families. After Mastrototaro was indicted under the Racketeer Influenced and Corrupt Organizations Act in 1981, the Green Street porn shop was shuttered in December.

One of 44 defendants, Mastrototaro was hit with multiple charges, including running an illegal gambling ring and the theft of $45,000 worth of pornographic videos. Other of his confederates were charged with narcotics trafficking. Mastrototaro pleaded guilty to some of the charges and was sentenced to eighteen months imprisonment. Released from prison, he was convicted of fraud in 1984 for participating in a travel scam that defrauded customers of $1 million and was sentenced to three years in jail.

== Bibliography ==
- Ford, Beverly and Schorow, Stephanie. The Boston Mob Guide: Hit Men, Hoodlums & Hideouts. Charleston, SC: The History Press, 2011. ISBN 978-1-60949-4209.
- Puleo, Stephen. The Boston Italians: A Story of Pride, Perseverance, and Paesani, from the Years of the Great Immigration to the Present Day. Boston: Beacon Press, 2007. ISBN 978-0-8070-5036-1.
- Silverman, Mark and Scott Deitche. Rogue Mobster: The Untold Story of Mark Silverman and the New England Mafia. Strategic Media Books, 2012. ISBN 9780984233380.
