= 1986 Massachusetts gubernatorial election =

- November 3, 1986
- Turnout: 57.41% ▼25.1
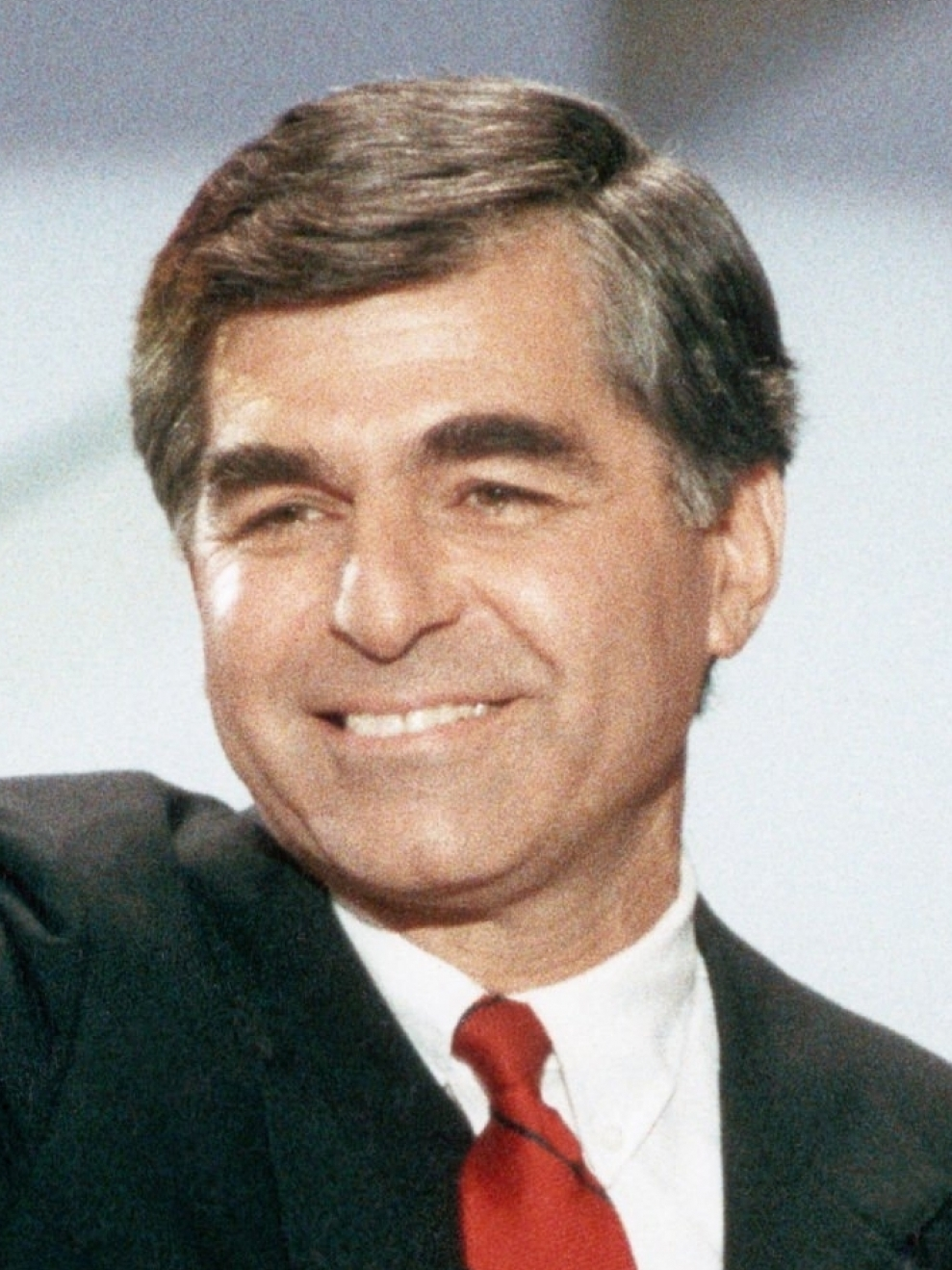

Nominee	Michael Dukakis	George Kariotis
Party	Democratic	Republican
Running mate	Evelyn Murphy	Nicholas Nikitas
Popular vote	1,157,786	525,364
Percentage	68.79%	31.21%
- Dukakis: 50–60% 60–70% 70–80% 80–90% Kariotis: 50–60% 70–80%
Governor before election
Michael Dukakis
Democratic
Elected Governor
Michael Dukakis
Democratic

The 1986 Massachusetts gubernatorial election was held on November 4, 1986. Michael Dukakis was elected governor of Massachusetts for a third term. He defeated Republican George Kariotis by a 69–31% margin. This was the last time a Democrat was elected governor of Massachusetts until 2006.

== Democratic primary ==
=== Governor ===
==== Candidates ====
- Michael Dukakis, incumbent governor

Michael Dukakis was unopposed for the Democratic nomination.

=== Lieutenant governor ===
==== Candidates ====
- Gerard D'Amico, state senator from Worcester
- Evelyn Murphy, former secretary of environmental affairs and candidate for lt. governor in 1982

John Kerry, the Democratic nominee for lieutenant governor in 1982, did not run for reelection, as he had been elected to the United States Senate in 1984.

==== Results ====
Massachusetts Democratic lt. gubernatorial primary, 1986
Party	Candidate	Votes	%
Democratic	Evelyn Murphy	374,714	60.10%
Democratic	Gerard D'Amico	248,671	39.89%

== Republican primary ==
=== Governor ===
==== Candidates ====
- George Kariotis, businessman and former secretary of economic affairs

===== Withdrew =====
- Greg Hyatt, lawyer and candidate for Massachusetts's 5th congressional district in 1984
- Royall H. Switzler, state representative from Wellesley

===== Eliminated at convention =====
- Guy Carbone, former Metropolitan District commissioner

===== Declined =====
- Paul W. Cronin, former U.S. representative for Massachusetts's 5th congressional district
- Edward J. King, former Democratic governor

==== Campaign ====
On March 13, Greg Hyatt became the first Republican to enter the gubernatorial race. A self-described "populist conservative", Hyatt supported limiting state taxes, bringing back the death penalty, and competency testing and merit pay for teachers. He opposed the state law that made wearing a seat belt mandatory, the use of roadblocks to crack down on drunken driving, and the use of public funds for abortions.

Shortly before the Republican convention, Boston attorney and former Metropolitan District Commissioner Guy Carbone entered the race.

The convention nomination was won by Royall H. Switzler, a state representative who had been drafted by anti-Hyatt Republicans after former Congressman Paul W. Cronin decided not to enter the race. To receive the endorsement of the party, a candidate must receive the support of 50% of the delegates. Only candidates receiving 15% of the vote or more on any ballot would be eligible for a primary. After a strong showing on the first ballot, some of Hyatt's major supporters, including Ray Shamie and Papa Gino's founder Michael Valerio, announced that they would not oppose Switzler's endorsement. On the second ballot, Switzler won the nomination with 975 votes. Since Carbone did not exceed 15% of the vote on either ballot, he was eliminated.

State Republican Convention results, 1986
Candidate	First ballot	Pct.	Second ballot	Pct.
Royall Switzler	775	40.28%	975	51.02%
Greg Hyatt	891	46.31%	876	45.84%
Guy Carbone	258	13.41%	60	3.14%

Despite losing the nomination, Hyatt chose to stay in the race and run against Switzler in the Republican primary. However, Switzler dropped out of the race in June after inaccuracies about his military record were revealed. He had falsely claimed to be a member of the United States Army Special Forces and stated that he had fought in Vietnam when he had only visited Vietnam on leave from noncombat duty in Korea.

Hyatt then dropped out of the race on July 14 amid accusations of forging names on his nomination papers, having ties to organized crime, and erratic personal behavior which included working nude in his office.

Businessman and former Secretary of Economic Affairs George Kariotis entered the race after both candidates dropped out. Because the filing deadline for the election was on March 1, Hyatt and Switzler remained on the ballot while Kariotis was forced to run a write in campaign. Hyatt won the election, but he and Switzler, who finished second, declined the nomination and Kariotis was declared the nominee.

==== Results ====
Republican primary results by municipality

Because both listed candidates had dropped out of the race, the Republican primary saw extremely low turnout.

Massachusetts Republican gubernatorial primary, 1986
Party	Candidate	Votes	%
Republican	Greg Hyatt (withdrew)	31,021	48.19%
Republican	Royall Switzler (withdrew)	20,802	32.32%
Republican	George Kariotis (write-in)	11,787	18.31%
Total votes		63,610	100.00%

=== Lieutenant governor ===
==== Candidates ====
- Nicholas M. Nikitas, hotel operator, real estate developer, and Republican Party activist

== General election ==
=== Results ===
Dukakis won a convincing victory over Kariotis. He increased his margins across the state, winning all 14 counties with a majority, even as total vote numbers were down sharply from the previous election.

Soon after being sworn in for his third term as governor, Dukakis began to run for the Democratic nomination for president in 1988.

1986 Massachusetts gubernatorial election
Party	Candidate	Votes	%	±%
Democratic	Michael Dukakis (incumbent)	1,157,786	68.79%	▲5.67
Republican	George Kariotis	525,364	31.21%	▼7.01
Total votes		1,683,150	100.00%	
None	Blank votes	93,138	—	
Turnout		1,776,288	100.00%	

=== Results by county ===
1986 United States presidential election in Massachusetts (by county)
County	Dukakis - D %	Dukakis - D #	Kariotis - R %	Kariotis - R #	Write-ins %	Write-ins #	Total #
Barnstable	62.8%	41,644	37.2%	24,641	0.0%	23	66,308
Berkshire	79.1%	33,753	20.9%	8,910	0.0%	6	42,669
Bristol	75.8%	97,813	24.2%	31,188	0.0%	31	129,032
Dukes	78.5%	3,642	21.4%	994	0.0%	1	4,637
Essex	67.0%	130,975	33.0%	64,437	0.0%	83	195,495
Franklin	74.8%	15,745	25.0%	5,259	0.3%	54	21,058
Hampden	72.5%	81,467	27.5%	30,881	0.0%	35	112,383
Hampshire	73.8%	28,500	26.0%	10,038	0.3%	105	38,463
Middlesex	68.2%	291,618	31.7%	135,699	0.1%	264	427,581
Nantucket	75.6%	1,567	24.4%	507	0.0%	0	2,074
Norfolk	65.4%	128,741	34.5%	67,923	0.0%	58	196,722
Plymouth	61.6%	71,100	38.4%	44,291	0.0%	42	115,443
Suffolk	74.5%	108,995	25.4%	37,223	0.1%	111	146,329
Worcester	65.8%	122,216	34.1%	63,373	0.1%	116	185,705

== See also ==
- 1985–1986 Massachusetts legislature
