= Sumner Z. Kaplan =

American politician (1920–2011)

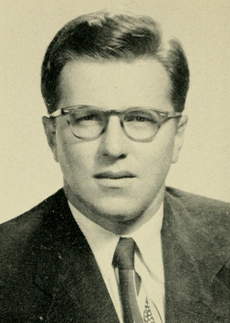

Member of the Massachusetts House of Representatives
- In office 1954–1962
- Succeeded by: Michael Dukakis

Probate and family court judge
- In office 1983–1993
- Nominated by: Edward J. King

Personal details
- Born: February 3, 1920 Boston, Massachusetts, U.S.
- Died: March 20, 2011 (aged 91) Boston, Massachusetts, U.S.
- Party: Democratic

Military service
- Allegiance: United States
- Branch/service: United States Army; United States Army Reserve
- Years of service: 1941–????
- Rank: Brigadier General

Sumner Zalman Kaplan (February 3, 1920 – March 20, 2011) was an American soldier, politician, and judge. Kaplan served in the United States Army in World War II, and later continued to serve in the United States Army Reserve. Kaplan was elected to the Massachusetts House of Representatives in 1954, and left after an unsuccessful run for the Massachusetts State Senate. Later serving in local elected offices in Brookline, Massachusetts, he was appointed as a judge in 1983, remaining in that position for ten years.

== Early life, education, and military service ==
The youngest of three children, Kaplan was born in Roxbury, Boston on February 3, 1920, and grew up in Dorchester and Roxbury. He graduated high school at Boston Latin School, in 1939. Two years later he graduated from Massachusetts State College. During World War II, he served in the United States Army in the United States Corps of Engineers, eventually being promoted to the rank of colonel.

Following the war, Kaplan reverted to the rank of lieutenant colonel in the United States Army Reserve and, in 1962, was serving in the role of chief of staff with the 94th Infantry Division. By 1971, he was promoted to brigadier general as he was assigned to become the deputy commanding general of 94th Army Reserve Command. (Note: 94th Army Reserve Command was a re-designation of 94th Infantry Division.) In 1974, he authorized the usage of two armored personnel carriers of the 187th Infantry Brigade by John Wayne during his 1974 visit to Harvard Square.

During the War in 1944, he married Eleanor Fisher, whom he met when he was 16 and she was 15. After World War II he graduated from Harvard Law School, and practiced law. Eleanor would go on to be an elementary school teacher. In 1982, a daughter of theirs, who worked for Chase Manhattan Bank, was married to a Columbia University history professor.

== Elected office, legislation, and judicial service ==
In 1954, Kaplan ran for the Massachusetts House of Representatives for Brookline, and won. While in office he advocated for legislation for rent control, opposed anti-communism legislation, and opposed the death penalty. Eight years later, he unsuccessfully ran for the Massachusetts State Senate, and his House of Representatives seat was filled by the election of Michael Dukakis. In 1962, Kaplan ran the unsuccessful senatorial campaign for Edward J. McCormack Jr.; for this he was not on good terms with Senator Ted Kennedy. He remained active in public office locally in Brookline, where he served in its town meeting and its select board.

In 1974, his writings on the Israeli Reserves were utilized in a journal article on cadre in reserve units. Kaplan was also a rabbi, officiating the wedding of the White House speech writer Richard N. Goodwin in 1975. Kaplan was involved in organizing for pro-Israel demonstrations in Boston; he would travel to Israel yearly after a partner of his law firm moved there. In 1983, he was appointed a probate and family court judge by Governor Edward J. King.

== Later life and death ==
Later, Kaplan served as general counsel to Merkert Enterprises of Canton, Massachusetts. In 2004, a successful effort was made to have a park named for him in Brookline; it is located in a playground. He moved to Jamaica Plain in 2010. He died of heart failure and lymphoma on March 22, 2011, at Beth Israel Deaconess Medical Center, in Boston, Massachusetts, at age 91, and was survived by five grandchildren, two daughters, and his wife of 66 years. Kaplan was interred at Sharon Memorial Park, Massachusetts.
