= Don Feder =

American journalist

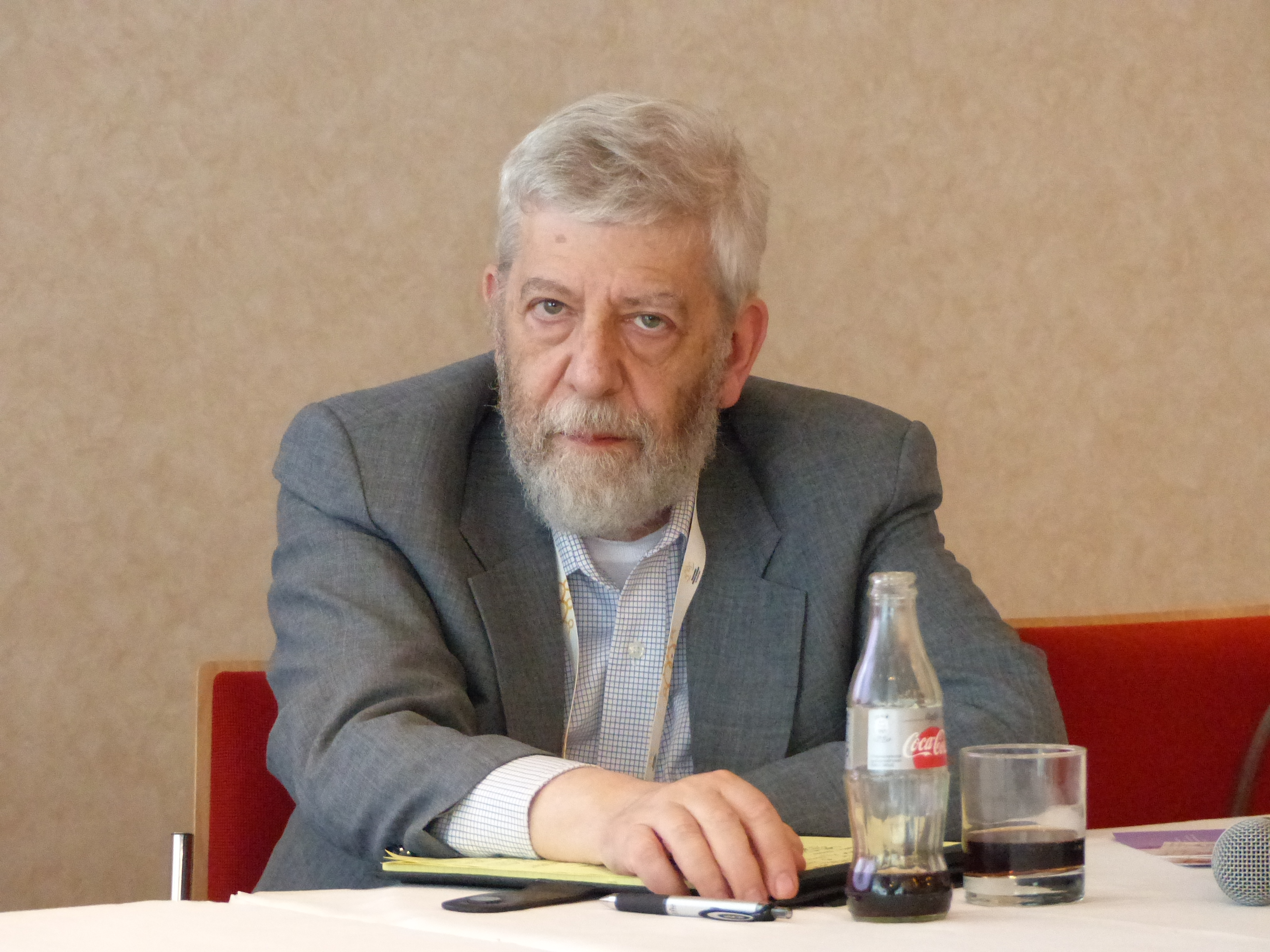
Don Feder

Donald A. Feder (born 1946) is a media consultant and free-lance writer. He is also World Congress of Families Communications Director. Feder operates Don Feder Associates, a conservative communications firm.

== Early life ==
Don Feder grew up in Johnstown, New York, and graduated from Johnstown High School in 1965. Feder is a 1969 graduate of the Boston University College of Liberal Arts and a 1972 graduate of the Boston University School of Law. He is admitted to the practice of law in New York and Massachusetts. He was a leader of Young Americans for Freedom—chapter chairman, Massachusetts State Chairman, New England Regional Director and member of the National Board of Directors from 1966 to 1972. At the time, YAF was America's largest conservative organization.

== Career ==
Feder practiced law in New York state from 1973 to 1976. He was the first executive director of Citizens for Limited Taxation (1976-1979), a Massachusetts taxpayers group which launched a successful drive for a statewide cap on property taxes. He was also the executive director of the Second Amendment Foundation an organization dedicated to preserving freedom of gun ownership from 1979 to 1981.

Feder was a Boston Herald editorial writer and syndicated columnist from June 1983 to June 2002. His column appeared in the Herald for 19 years. His 2,000th column appeared on February 28, 2002.

Feder's column was syndicated by Creators Syndicate and carried by more than 40 newspapers and e-magazines. His writings have appeared in USA Today, The Wall Street Journal, The Weekly Standard, National Review, The American Enterprise, Reader's Digest, FrontPage Magazine, Insight magazine, and Human Events.

He wrote two books: A Jewish Conservative Looks at Pagan America (1993) and Who's Afraid of the Religious Right? (1996).

Feder has addressed the annual conventions or meetings of the Rabbinical Council of America, Concerned Women for America, Toward Tradition, the Christian Coalition of America, National Right to Life Committee, the Conservative Political Action Conference, the College Republicans, the Council for National Policy, The Heritage Foundation, Family Research Council, the Interfaith Zionist Leadership Summit, the World Affairs Councils of America of Boston and Portland, Maine, World Congress of Families II (Geneva, 1999) III (Mexico City, 2004), IV (Warsaw, 2007) and Amsterdam (2009), as well as the Values Voter Summit (2006 and 2008).

Feder has lectured or debated at Harvard, Dartmouth, Princeton, Hillsdale College, Bates College, Carlton College, Grove City College, New York University, Regent University, UCLA, Hampshire College, the University of Massachusetts Amherst, Boston University and Boston College.

He has appeared on network and syndicated radio and television shows, including The O'Reilly Factor, C-SPAN, Politically Incorrect, The 700 Club, Focus on the Family, Beverly LaHaye Live, Phyllis Schlafly Live, Coral Ridge Ministries, Fox & Friends, and Jerry Falwell's Listen America. His columns have been read on the air by Rush Limbaugh, Dr. Laura and Michael Savage.

Feder was the communications director and public spokesman of the documentaries Demographic Winter: the Decline of the Human Family and Demographic Bomb: Demography is Destiny from 2008 to 2010. These are the first and only documentaries on the worldwide decline in birthrates.

== Controversy ==
As a student at Boston University, Feder worked against the anti-war movement. In November 1969, he helped to organize a Support Our Troops Rally on the Boston Common.

In 2009, Feder attempted to speak on hate crimes at the University of Massachusetts Amherst, but was prevented from speaking by a group of student protesters.

== Awards and honors ==
Feder is the 1998 recipient of the International Communications Award of the Republic of China on Taiwan and the winner of the first-place prize in the Amy Foundation Writing Awards for 1993. The Amy Foundation recognizes writers who project Biblical truths in the secular media.

== Personal life ==
Feder has been married for 37 years to Andrea. He has four children: Helena, Anna, Jonathan, and Aaron. He also has two grandchildren: Leah and Daniel.

New office	Executive Director of Citizens for Limited Taxation; 1976 – 1979	Succeeded by Greg Hyatt
