= Iacone =

Iacone is a surname. Notable people with the surname include:

- Joe Iacone (born 1940), American football player
- Simone Iacone (born 1984), Italian auto racing driver

== See also ==
- Iaconi
