= John Conte (politician) =

American politician

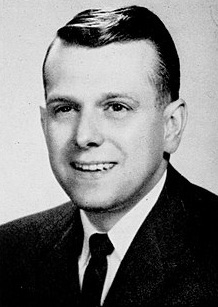
- John Conte, circa 1967

District Attorney of Worcester County, Massachusetts
- In office 1976–2007
- Preceded by: William T. Buckley
- Succeeded by: Joseph Early, Jr.

Member of the Massachusetts Senate
- In office 1963–1976
- Preceded by: Harold Lundgren
- Succeeded by: Gerard D'Amico

Personal details
- Born: May 3, 1930 (age 96) Worcester, Massachusetts, U.S.
- Party: Democratic
- Education: College of the Holy Cross (BA); New England School of Law (LLB)

John Joseph Conte is an American politician who served in the Massachusetts Senate and was the District Attorney for Worcester County, Massachusetts (Middle District), which includes 59 cities and towns in Worcester County and the town of Bellingham in Norfolk County, Massachusetts.

Conte was a member of the Massachusetts Senate from 1963 until he was appointed District Attorney by Governor Michael Dukakis in 1976. He was elected to the first of seven terms in 1978. He announced his retirement in January 2006 and was succeeded by Joseph Early, Jr. on January 3, 2007.

== Early life and education ==
Conte was born on May 3, 1930, in Worcester, Massachusetts. He graduated from the College of the Holy Cross and the New England School of Law.

== Operation Big League ==
In 1981, Conte successfully prosecuted Worcester crime boss Carlo Mastrototaro, a Genovese crime family caporegime who also was affiliated with the Patriarca crime family. In league with federal and state law enforcement officials, Conte launched "Operation Big League" against Mastrototaro and other organized crime figures in Worcester. Starting in October 1980, the investigation used electronic surveillance to get the goods on the gangsters. In August 1981, police raids were launched against 17 locations in Worcester, Springfield and other Massachusetts cities. Conte announced, "All aspects of organized crime, from gaming and drugs to extortion, porno shops and prostitution – you name it, it was all uncovered in one fashion or another in this investigation".

One of 44 defendants, Mastrototaro was hit with multiple charges, including running an illegal gambling ring and the theft of $45,000 worth of pornographic videos. Other of his confederates were charged with narcotics trafficking. Mastrototaro pleaded guilty to some of the charges and was sentenced to eighteen months imprisonment. Released from prison, he was convicted of fraud in 1984 for participating in a travel scam that defrauded customers of $1 million and was sentenced to three years in jail.

In June 1983, Conte launched "Operation Rackets" against those running a gambling network in the Leominster area. The investigation led to the indictment of thirteen people.

== See also ==
- Massachusetts Senate's 2nd Worcester district
