= Barbara Anderson (anti-tax activist) =

Activist (b. 1943, d. 2016)

Barbara Anderson (1943 – April 8, 2016) was an anti-tax activist. She was eulogized by Governor of Massachusetts Charlie Baker for her contribution to reducing property, income and excise taxes for state citizens (moving Massachusetts from the sixth-heaviest taxed state to the 36th). She was an executive director of Citizens for Limited Taxation for 35 years. In November 1980, she led the property tax relief campaign, instituting the ballot initiative empowering voters with a veto on property tax hikes. She was instrumental in the repeal of the state income tax surtax; defeat of the graduated income tax ballot question, and “temporary” state income tax increase rollback. She was a weekly contributor to both The Salem News and The Lawrence Eagle-Tribune Publishing Company. Anderson was known as “The Mother of Proposition 2½.” She co-hosted a popular WRKO radio program with newspaper columnist Howie Carr and radio personality Jerry Williams.

Preceded by Greg Hyatt	Executive Director of Citizens for Limited Taxation; 1980 – 2015	Succeeded by Chip Ford
