= Royall H. Switzler =

American politician

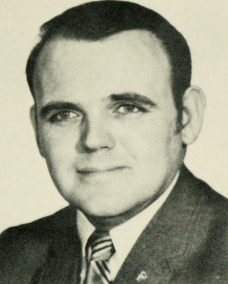
- Switzler c. 1985

Member of the Massachusetts House of Representatives
- In office 1973–1975
- Preceded by: Richard W. Daly
- Succeeded by: Bruce H. Zeiser (redistricting)
- Constituency: 9th Norfolk
- In office 1977–1986
- Preceded by: Bruce H. Zeiser
- Succeeded by: Robert H. Marsh
- Constituency: 15th Norfolk (1977–79); 14th Norfolk (1979–86)

Personal details
- Born: September 27, 1938 (age 88) Boston, Massachusetts
- Party: Republican
- Relatives: William Franklin Switzler (great-great-grandfather)
- Education: Northeastern University
- Occupation: Real Estate Broker; Politician

Royall H. Switzler (born September 27, 1938 in Boston) is an American politician who served in the Massachusetts House of Representatives from 1973 to 1975 and again from 1977 to 1986. He was a candidate for Governor of Massachusetts in 1986 until he dropped out after inaccuracies about his military record were revealed.

== Massachusetts House of Representatives ==
A real estate broker and a Wellesley, Massachusetts Town Meeting Member, Switzler was first elected to the Massachusetts House of Representatives in 1972.

In 1974, redistricting forced Switzler to face fellow Republican representative Bruce H. Zeiser in the newly created 15th Norfolk District. Zeiser defeated Switzler 1,939 votes to 1,803.

Zeiser did not run for re-election in 1976 and Switzler ran to succeed him. He defeated Edwina Giles in the Republican primary and David J. Daly in the general election.

During his tenure as State Representative, Switzler was described as an "outspoken" and "vociferous" critic of the House leadership and as "an unsufferable [sic] windbag" who continuously used dilatory motions and tactics to delay the legislative process.

Switzler co-wrote the property tax law known as Proposition 2½, which was passed by ballot initiative in 1980. In 1985 he sponsored a successful bill that prevented the Department of Social Services from placing foster children with homosexual couples.

== 1986 gubernatorial election ==
At the 1986 Massachusetts Republican Convention, Switzler was drafted by Republicans who opposed the nomination of Greg Hyatt after an unsuccessful attempt to get former Congressman Paul W. Cronin to enter the race. After Switzler's strong showing on the first ballot (891 votes for Hyatt, 775 votes for Switzler, 258 votes for Guy Carbone), some of Hyatt's major supporters, including Ray Shamie and Papa Gino's founder Michael Valerio, announced that they would not oppose Switzler's nomination. On the second ballot, Switzler won the nomination with 975 votes to Hyatt's 876 and Carbone's 60.

After winning the nomination, Switzler resigned his House seat to focus on his campaign full-time.

In June, Switzler dropped out of the race after inaccuracies about his military record were revealed. He had falsely claimed to be a member of the United States Army Special Forces and stated that he had fought in Vietnam when he had only visited Vietnam on leave from noncombat duty in Korea.

== Later life ==
From 1991 to 2000, Switzler was a member of the Wellesley Board of Selectmen.

In 2010, Switzler ran as a write-in candidate for his old House seat. He gained enough signatures to win the Republican nomination, but lost in the general election to incumbent Alice Peisch.
