= George Kariotis =

American businessman (1923–2013)

- Born: George S. Kariotis; February 22, 1923
- Died: July 7, 2013 (aged 90); Eastham, Massachusetts, U.S.
- Education: Northeastern University
- Occupations: Politician; businessman
- Political party: Republican

George S. Kariotis (February 22, 1923 – July 7, 2013) was an American businessman who was the Republican Party nominee for Governor of Massachusetts in 1986.

Kariotis was born on February 22, 1923. He was the son of Greek immigrants. He graduated from Northeastern University in 1940, and then served in the United States Navy during World War II. In 1962, he founded Alpha Industries, a manufacturer of microwave components. He was Massachusetts Secretary of Economic Affairs from 1979 to 1983 under governor Edward J. King. King was a conservative Democrat during his time in office who later became Republican.

Kariotis ran a write-in campaign in the 1986 Republican primary for Massachusetts governor, and finished third with 17% of the vote. He became the nominee when the two candidates who finished ahead of him Royall H. Switzler and Greg Hyatt both withdrew from the race due to personal scandals. In the general election, he was defeated by Michael Dukakis, also Greek-American, by a margin of 69% to 31%.

Kariotis was a major donor to Northeastern University and an emeritus vice-chairman of the university's board of trustees.

== Death ==
Kariotis, 90, died in his sleep on July 7, 2013 at his home in Eastham, Massachusetts. In his later years, he had divided his time between Eastham and Marco Island, Florida.

Party political offices
Preceded by John W. Sears	Massachusetts Republican Party gubernatorial candidate 1986 (lost)	Succeeded by William Weld
