= Evelyn Murphy =

American politician

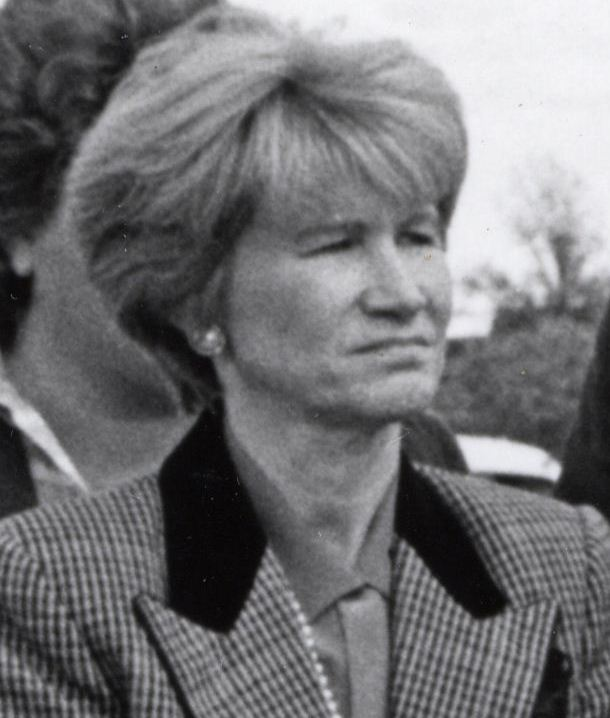
- Murphy c. 1984–1987

67th Lieutenant Governor of Massachusetts
- In office January 8, 1987 – January 3, 1991
- Governor: Michael Dukakis
- Preceded by: John Kerry
- Succeeded by: Paul Cellucci

Massachusetts Secretary of Economic Affairs
- In office January 6, 1983 – December 16, 1985
- Governor: Michael Dukakis
- Preceded by: George Kariotis
- Succeeded by: Joseph Alviani

Massachusetts Secretary of Environmental Affairs
- In office January 2, 1975 – January 4, 1979
- Governor: Michael Dukakis
- Preceded by: Hank Foster
- Succeeded by: John A. Bewick

Personal details
- Born: May 14, 1940 (age 86) Ancón, Panama
- Party: Democratic
- Education: Duke University; Columbia University

Evelyn Murphy (born May 14, 1940) is an American businesswoman and politician who was the 67th lieutenant governor of Massachusetts from 1987 to 1991, being the first woman in the history of the state to hold a constitutional office. She is now the president of The WAGE Project, a United States nonprofit organization dedicated to eliminating wage discrimination against women; a resident scholar at the Women's Studies Research Center at Brandeis University, and a corporate director.

== Early life and education ==
Murphy was born in 1940 in Ancón, Panama, to American citizens. Her father was stationed with the army in the Panama Canal Zone, where her mother joined him in 1939. At the age of six weeks, Murphy was brought to her grandmother's home in Massachusetts. She continued to hold dual U.S.-Panamanian citizenship until the age of 19, when she took the oath of U.S. citizenship in Washington, D.C.

Murphy earned a bachelor's degree in mathematics from Duke University, a master's degree in economics from Columbia University, and a doctorate in economics from Duke University. She was a fellow at the Institute of Politics of Harvard's Kennedy School of Government.

== Political career ==
Murphy served as Massachusetts Secretary of Environmental Affairs from 1974 to 1978. In September 1979 President Jimmy Carter named her to the chairmanship of the National Advisory Committee on Oceans and Atmosphere. In 1982 Murphy sought the Democratic nomination for Lieutenant Governor, losing to John Kerry. In 1983 she was appointed Secretary of Economic Affairs, a position she held until 1985.

=== Lieutenant governor ===
In 1986 Murphy ran for Lieutenant Governor against State Senator Gerard D'Amico in the Democratic primary, winning by 374,714 votes (60.10%) to 248,671 votes (39.89%) for D'Amico. In the general election, the Dukakis-Murphy team garnered 1,157,786 votes (65.15%) versus 525,364 votes (34,85%) for George Kariotis and Nicholas Nikitas.

During her tenure as Lieutenant Governor, Murphy had little communication with Governor Dukakis. She described their relationship by stating "there is no good will here and certainly no mutual respect". Dukakis did not invite Murphy to key meetings and did not tell her when he was out of state campaigning for President of the United States. Thus, she would serve as acting governor without even knowing it.

=== 1990 gubernatorial election ===
After Dukakis announced that he was not running for Governor of Massachusetts in 1990, Murphy entered the race. With strong name recognition and a solid base of liberal support, Murphy was the early frontrunner. In July 1989, Murphy led Attorney General Francis X. Bellotti 42% to 18% in a Boston Globe poll. That November, Murphy still led Bellotti, but only by 2%. In January, after Bellotti's first wave of television commercials and the entry of Boston University President John Silber into the race, Murphy fell to 20% to Bellotti's 38% and Silber's 16%. At the 1990 Democratic Convention, Bellotti won the convention endorsement with 51% to Murphy's 40% on the second ballot. Silber received 15.5% on the first ballot, which allowed him to run in the primary.

Murphy's campaign appeared to be badly hurt by the public perception that she was close to the unpopular Dukakis and therefore tried to make a break with the Dukakis Administration. Dukakis twice postponed a trade mission to Europe because Murphy hinted at a news conference that she would execute her own economic plan while serving as acting governor. After the incident, Murphy's unfavorable rating rose to 49% in a Boston Globe/WBZ-TV poll, compared to 38% a month earlier. A week before the primary, Murphy withdrew from the race so that she would not be a spoiler in the race and cost fellow liberal Bellotti the nomination. Bellotti would lose the nomination to Silber 53% to 44%.

== Corporate career ==
In 1990 Murphy entered the corporate world. She became managing director of the law firm Brown, Rudnick, Freed & Gesmer, and corporate director of Blue Cross and Blue Shield of Massachusetts, Shawmut National Banks, Fleet National Bank, Fleet Mortgage Company, and Fleet Credit Card Corporation. Blue Cross recruited her to the position of executive vice president in charge of federal and stage media and civic relations. During the latter job, she founded Blue Cross' HealthCare Policy Institute.

Today Murphy is a resident scholar at the Women's Studies Research Center at Brandeis University, vice chair of the board of SBLI USA Mutual Life Insurance Company, a director of the Citizens Energy Corporation, a director of the Commonwealth Institute, and a trustee of Regis College.

She has been awarded 11 honorary degrees and over 100 national, state, and local awards.

== The WAGE Project ==
Her 2005 book, Getting Even: Why women don't get paid like men and what to do about it was the product of a research effort lasting eight years. In conjunction with the book, Murphy founded The WAGE Project (Women Are Getting Even) to battle wage discrimination against working women. She has testified before U.S. Senate and House committee hearings on pay discrimination against women.

== See also ==
- List of female lieutenant governors in the United States

Party political offices
Preceded by John Kerry	Democratic nominee for Lieutenant Governor of Massachusetts; 1986	Succeeded by Marjorie Clapprood
