= Massachusetts Miracle =

Period of economic growth in the 1980s

The Massachusetts Miracle was a period of economic growth in Massachusetts during most of the 1980s. Before then, the state had been hit hard by deindustrialization and resulting unemployment. During the Miracle, the unemployment rate fell from more than 12% in 1975 to less than 3%, which was accompanied by tax reductions and a drastic increase in personal income.

== Background ==
Massachusetts's industrial economy began to decline during the early 20th century, with the departure of several manufacturing companies. By the 1920s, competition from the South and Midwest, followed by the Great Depression, led to the collapse of the three main industries in Massachusetts: textiles, shoemaking, and precision mechanics. This industrial decline would continue throughout the century; between 1950 and 1979, the number of Massachusetts residents involved in textile manufacturing declined from 264,000 to 63,000. The 1969 closure of the Springfield Armory spurred an exodus of high-paying jobs from western Massachusetts.

== Initial growth ==
The growth was heavily centered in financial services and the high-tech industry (often driven by technology out of Harvard University and MIT), and within Boston and in its suburbs along Route 128. The expansion of the high-tech industry along Route 128 has led to the name of the road being used as a nickname for the regional tech economy, much like Silicon Valley.

Notable companies associated with the Miracle include Digital Equipment Corporation, Data General, Wang Laboratories, Prime Computer, Lotus Development Corporation, and Apollo Computer.

Michael Dukakis was Governor of Massachusetts during most of this time and attempted to take credit for the "Miracle." Voted back into office in 1982, Dukakis attempted to maintain his Massachusetts Technology Development Corporation, a state vehicle for reshaping tax revenue into venture capital. For start-ups, instead of relying on property taxes, Dukakis "worked to broker deals between high-tech companies and Boston-based venture capital firms." The firms contracted with previous MTDC-framed scaleup companies to fund another wave of start-ups along Route 128. A confluence of external economic factors allowed scaleups and private investors, not property taxpayers, to produce an economic upswing. Dukakis set this process in motion yet planned not to play a substantial role. As a result, Republican Party pundits and subsequent scholars critiqued his 1988 campaign to describe himself as the embodiment of the Massachusetts turnaround. The second coming state platform that had made him into the national Democratic Party candidate during the 1988 United States presidential election counterintuitively contributed to his own electoral defeat. In contrast, Dukakis' alterations in Atari Democrat philosophy also became tenets of the winning New Democrat platforms.

== Early 1990s recession ==
In the early 1990s, Massachusetts, like most of the Northeast, was much more severely affected by the early 1990s recession than the country as a whole, with the unemployment rate nearly reaching 9% by the summer of 1992. However, Massachusetts recovered from the recession faster than the rest of the Northeast, helped by the nationwide tech boom of the 1990s, and by the end of the decade the unemployment rate once again fell below 3%.
