= Gerard D'Amico =

American politician

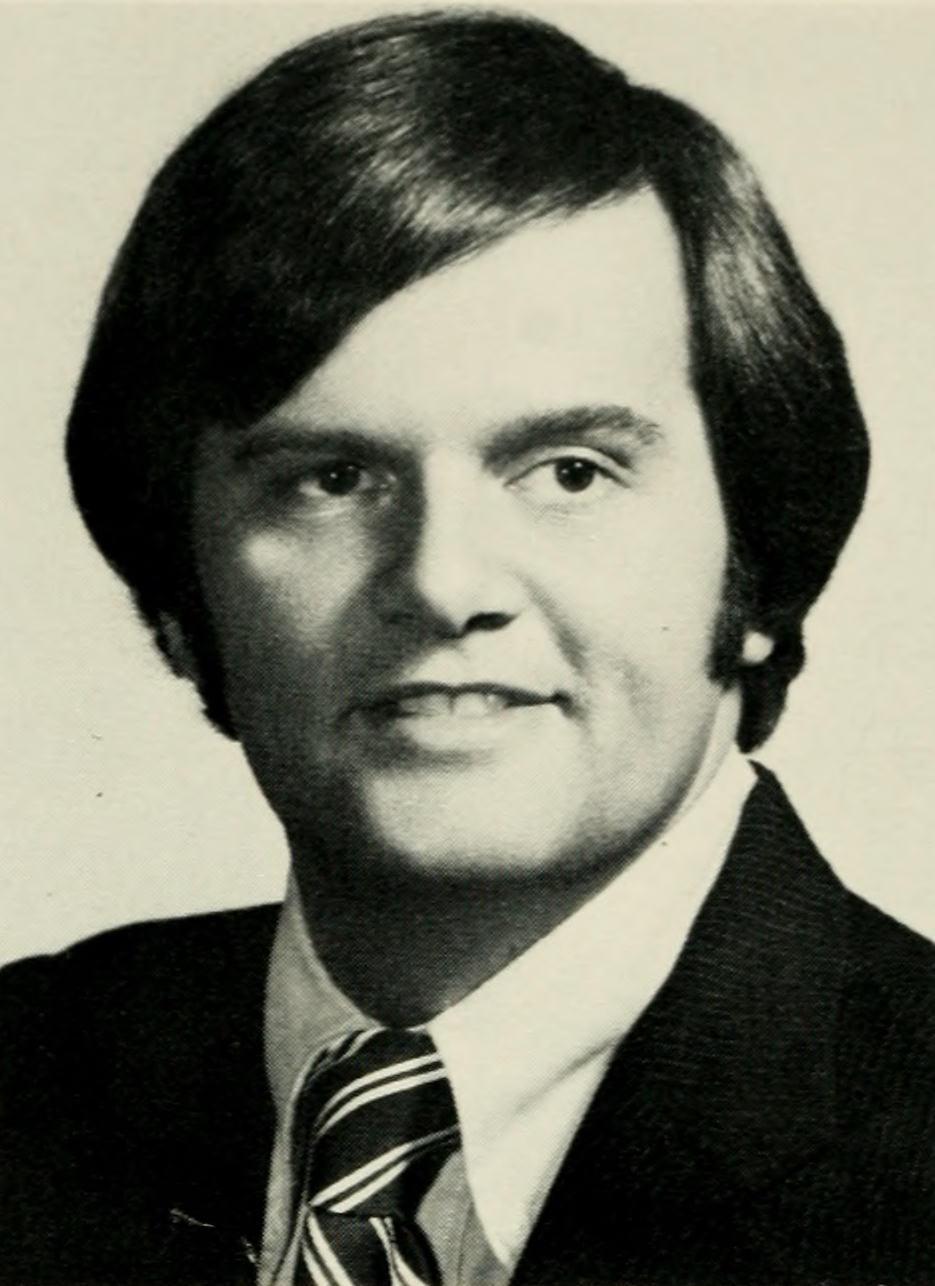

Member of the Massachusetts Senate from the 1st Worcester District
- In office 1977–1987
- Preceded by: John Conte
- Succeeded by: Thomas White

Personal details
- Born: July 27, 1947 (age 79) Worcester, Massachusetts
- Party: Democratic
- Education: Boston University; Harvard University John F. Kennedy School of Government

Gerard D'Amico is an American politician who served in the Massachusetts Senate from 1977 to 1987 and was a member of the Worcester, Massachusetts School Committee from 1972 to 1976. He was a candidate for Lieutenant Governor of Massachusetts in 1986. He lost to Evelyn Murphy in the Democratic primary.
