= Guy Carbone =

American politician

Guy A. Carbone

Metropolitan District Commissioner
- In office 1979–1980
- Governor: Edward J. King
- Preceded by: John F. Haggerty
- Succeeded by: Terrance Geoghegan

Personal details
- Party: Republican (1981–present); Democratic (1978–1981)
- Occupation: Attorney

Guy A. Carbone is an American attorney and Perennial candidate in Massachusetts who was Metropolitan District Commissioner from 1979–1980.

== Electoral history ==
1978 Northern District District Attorney Democratic primary
Party	Candidate	Votes	%	±%
Democratic	John J. Droney	89,131	43.16%	
Democratic	Scott Harshbarger	82,762	40.07%	
Democratic	Guy Carbone	34,625	16.77%	

1982 Northern District District Attorney general election
Party	Candidate	Votes	%	±%
Democratic	Scott Harshbarger	357,797	74.00%	
Republican	Guy Carbone	125,724	26.00%	

Massachusetts Attorney General Republican Primary, 1990
Party	Candidate	Votes	%	±%
Republican	William C. Sawyer	199,567	52.73%	
Republican	Guy Carbone	178,669	47.21%	
Write-in		231	0.00%	

Massachusetts Attorney General Republican Primary, 1994
Party	Candidate	Votes	%	±%
Republican	Janis M. Berry	138,875	71.09%	
Republican	Guy Carbone	56,288	28.81%	
Write-in		215	0.00%	

Massachusetts's 5th congressional district Republican primary, 1996
Party	Candidate	Votes	%	±%
Republican	Jonathan P. Raymond	3,823	52.41%	
Republican	Guy Carbone	3,471	47.59%	
Write-in		11	0.00%	

Middlesex and Suffolk Massachusetts Senate district general election, 1998
Party	Candidate	Votes	%	±%
Democratic	Steven Tolman	30,480	74.56%	
Republican	Guy Carbone	10,399	25.44%	
Write-in		17	0.00%	

Massachusetts Attorney General Republican Primary, 2010
Party	Candidate	Votes	%	±%
Republican	Jim McKenna (Write-in)	27,711	54.38%	
Republican	Guy Carbone (Write-in)	9,505	18.66%	
Other		13,734	26.96%	

Belmont Board of Selectmen election, 2017
Party	Candidate	Votes	%	±%
Nonpartisan	Adam Dash	3,125	63.35%	
Nonpartisan	Guy Carbone	1,808	36.65%	

=== Other races ===
- Massachusetts gubernatorial election, 1982 – Dropped out to run for Northern District District Attorney.
- Massachusetts gubernatorial election, 1986 – Did not receive enough votes at the Republican convention.
- Massachusetts gubernatorial election, 1990 – Dropped out to run for Massachusetts Attorney General.
