= Frank Iaconi =

Italian-American gangster in Worcester, Massachusetts (1895–1956)

Frank Iaconi (c. 1895 – July 14, 1956) was an Italian American gangster who reigned as crime boss of Worcester, Massachusetts, from the days of Prohibition through 1953. Though part of the Patriarca family's territory, Worcester was in fact a fiefdom of the Mafia's Genovese family.

Iaconi enjoyed police protection, allegedly because he focused on gambling and forbade large-scale dope-dealing and prostitution. Worcester was considered such a safe-haven for organized crime that the Mafia bosses held a conference there in 1950. That was the same year that Iaconi ran afoul of the Kefauver Committee investigating organized crime.

Iaconi's testimony before the committee led to Committee Chairman Estes Kefauver have Iaconi's tax returns examined, which led to an Internal Revenue Service investigation of Iaconi. In February 1953, Iaconi was indicted for failing to pay $217,875 in taxes on $350,000 in revenue from racketeering and for money laundering. After pleading guilty, he was imprisoned at Danbury Federal Prison for 11 months. He died from natural causes soon after being released.

== Bibliography ==
- Ford, Beverly and Schorow, Stephanie. The Boston Mob Guide: Hit Men, Hoodlums & Hideouts. Charleston, SC: The History Press, 2011. ISBN 978-1-60949-4209.
- Puleo, Stephen. The Boston Italians: A Story of Pride, Perseverance, and Paesani, from the Years of the Great Immigration to the Present Day. Boston: Beacon Press, 2007. ISBN 978-0-8070-5036-1.
- Silverman, Mark and Scott Deitche. Rogue Mobster: The Untold Story of Mark Silverman and the New England Mafia. Strategic Media Books, 2012. ISBN 9780984233380.
