= Red, Hot and Blue (disambiguation) =

Red, Hot and Blue may refer to:

- Red, Hot and Blue, a 1936 Cole Porter musical
- Red Hot + Blue, a compilation music album
- Redhot & Blue (musical group), a Yale University a cappella group
- Red Hot & Blue (Lee Atwater recording project), 1990
- Red Hot & Blue (restaurant), an American barbecue restaurant franchise
- Red, Hot and Blue (film), a 1949 musical comedy film
- Red, Hot and Blue, a radio show hosted by Memphis deejay Dewey Phillips

== See also ==
- The Red Hot Blues of Phil Guy, a 1982 album
