= Sideshow Bob Roberts =

- The Simpsons episode
- Episode no.: Season 6 Episode 5
- Directed by: Mark Kirkland
- Written by: Bill Oakley & Josh Weinstein
- Production code: 2F02
- Original air date: October 9, 1994

Guest appearances
- Kelsey Grammer as Sideshow Bob; Larry King as himself; Dr. Demento as himself; Phil Hartman as Lionel Hutz; Henry Corden as Fred Flintstone

Episode features
- Commentary: Matt Groening; David Mirkin; Bill Oakley; Josh Weinstein

Episode chronology
← Previous "Itchy & Scratchy Land"	Next → "Treehouse of Horror V"
- The Simpsons season 6

"Sideshow Bob Roberts" is the fifth episode of the sixth season of the American animated television series The Simpsons. It originally aired on Fox in the United States on October 9, 1994. Kelsey Grammer returns in his fourth major appearance as Sideshow Bob, who, in this episode, wins the Springfield mayoral election through electoral fraud to get revenge on Bart. The episode received a favorable reception in the media, including a positive mention in I Can't Believe It's a Bigger and Better Updated Unofficial Simpsons Guide and Green Bay Press-Gazette. A review in Press & Sun-Bulletin placed the episode as the seventh best of the series.

The episode was written by Bill Oakley and Josh Weinstein and directed by Mark Kirkland. Oakley and Weinstein drew inspiration for the episode from the Watergate scandal, and included many cultural references to political films and real-life events, among them All the President's Men and the 1960 United States presidential debates between Richard Nixon and John F. Kennedy. It marks the debut of Birch Barlow.

== Plot ==
Sideshow Bob calls local right-wing talk show host Birch Barlow and complains about being unfairly imprisoned for attempted murder. (Note: As depicted in the 1992 episode "Black Widower" and the 1993 episode "Cape Feare") Barlow incites Springfield's residents to pressure Mayor Quimby into releasing Sideshow Bob. After his release, Bob becomes the Republican candidate for the Springfield mayoral election. Bart and Lisa attempt to prevent Bob's election by aiding Quimby's campaign. However, after Quimby falls ill after a meet-and-greet with senior citizens and takes 'extra drowsy' cold and flu medicine, he loses a mayoral debate (hosted by Barlow). Bob wins in a landslide, with even Homer and Krusty the Clown having voted for him.

Abusing his office, Bob proceeds to make the Simpsons' lives miserable, demoting Bart to kindergarten and threatening to demolish their house to build a new freeway. Bart and Lisa suspect the election was rigged but are unable to find any proof. Waylon Smithers, who worked for Sideshow Bob's campaign but fears Bob's ultraconservative views conflict with Smithers' "choice of lifestyle", tells them to find a voter named Edgar Neubauer. Having not found it in the library or the telephone directory, Bart finds the name on a tombstone at the cemetery. When he and Lisa check other names on voting rolls, they notice that most voters for Bob are long dead, including celebrities such as Jiles Richardson Jr. (The Big Bopper) and pets such as Lisa's deceased cat Snowball.

Sideshow Bob is put on trial for electoral fraud. While he initially denies the charges, Bart and Lisa bait his ego by claiming that he isn't intelligent enough to have rigged an election and was merely Barlow's accomplice, causing an indignant Bob to angrily take full credit for the fraud and hand over evidence to prove it. Bob is found guilty, stripped of his position and sent to a minimum-security prison. With all of his mayoral decisions nullified and reversed, the Simpsons' house is saved, the freeway is put on hold, Bart returns to his proper grade, and Quimby reclaims his job as Springfield's rightful mayor.

== Production ==
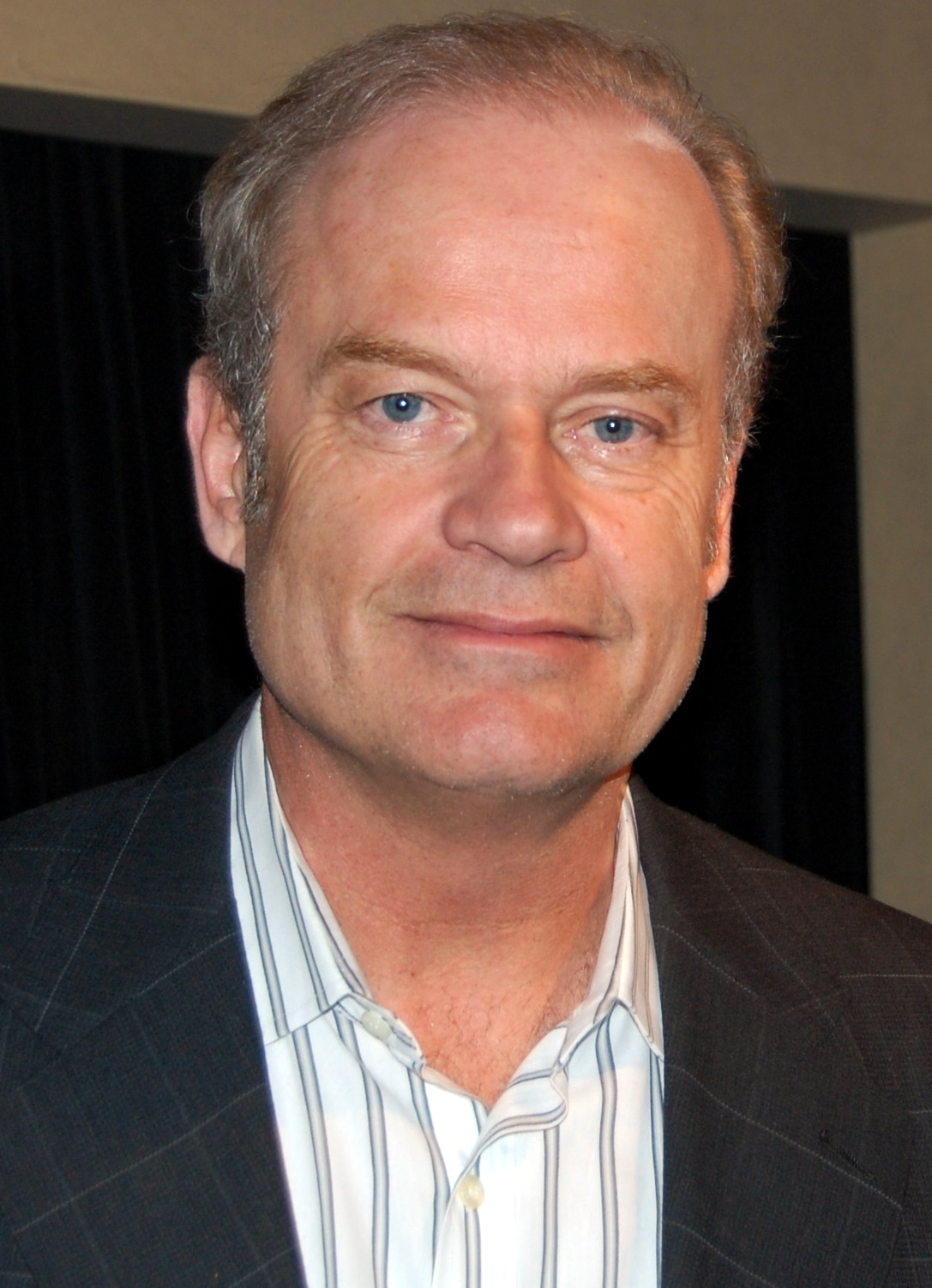
The episode was the fourth appearance of Kelsey Grammer as Sideshow Bob.

Although the episode primarily mocks the Republican Party, the writers included several jokes at the expense of the Democratic Party, liberal and conservative politics, to try to be as neutral as possible. Writers Bill Oakley and Josh Weinstein were very interested in the Watergate scandal and based a lot of the second act on that. Mark Kirkland directed the episode.

The episode sees Kelsey Grammer, himself a supporter of the Republican Party, return as Sideshow Bob for his fourth appearance. Clips from previous episodes featuring Bob were used to remind viewers who he was and what he had done. Bob's Cape Fear musical cue from the episode "Cape Feare" is also reused. Showrunner David Mirkin found directing Grammer "a joy". Dr. Demento also guest-starred, as did Larry King for the second time, while Henry Corden voices Fred Flintstone on the Flintstones toy phone. One of the prisoners in Bob's campaign advert is a caricature of producer Richard Sakai. The "Les Wynan" joke was pitched by Mike Reiss. The episode uses a unique, heavily-shortened version of the series' opening sequence in which the initial shot of the clouds cuts immediately to the closing shot of the Simpsons' TV; as a result, the episode does not feature a chalkboard or couch gag, although the original 1994 airing and some syndication edits included a couch gag.

== Cultural references ==
The title of the episode and several plot elements, including Bob entering Burns' meeting draped in an American flag, are references to the 1992 film Bob Roberts. Much of the episode is based on the Watergate scandal, as well as other real-life political events. The two Republicans who follow Bob around were based on H. R. Haldeman and John Ehrlichman, two of Richard Nixon's closest advisors during Watergate. Sideshow Bob's campaign advert was based on the famous Willie Horton and "Revolving Door" political advertisements used by George H. W. Bush during the 1988 United States presidential election. Birch Barlow's question to Mayor Quimby about whether his stance on crime would differ if it was his family being attacked is a reference to Bernard Shaw's similar question to Democratic candidate Michael Dukakis during the 1988 presidential debates. Quimby's appearance during the debate parodies Richard Nixon's appearance during his first televised debate with John F. Kennedy during the 1960 presidential election. Nixon sweated considerably throughout, which was detrimental to the impression he made in the debate.

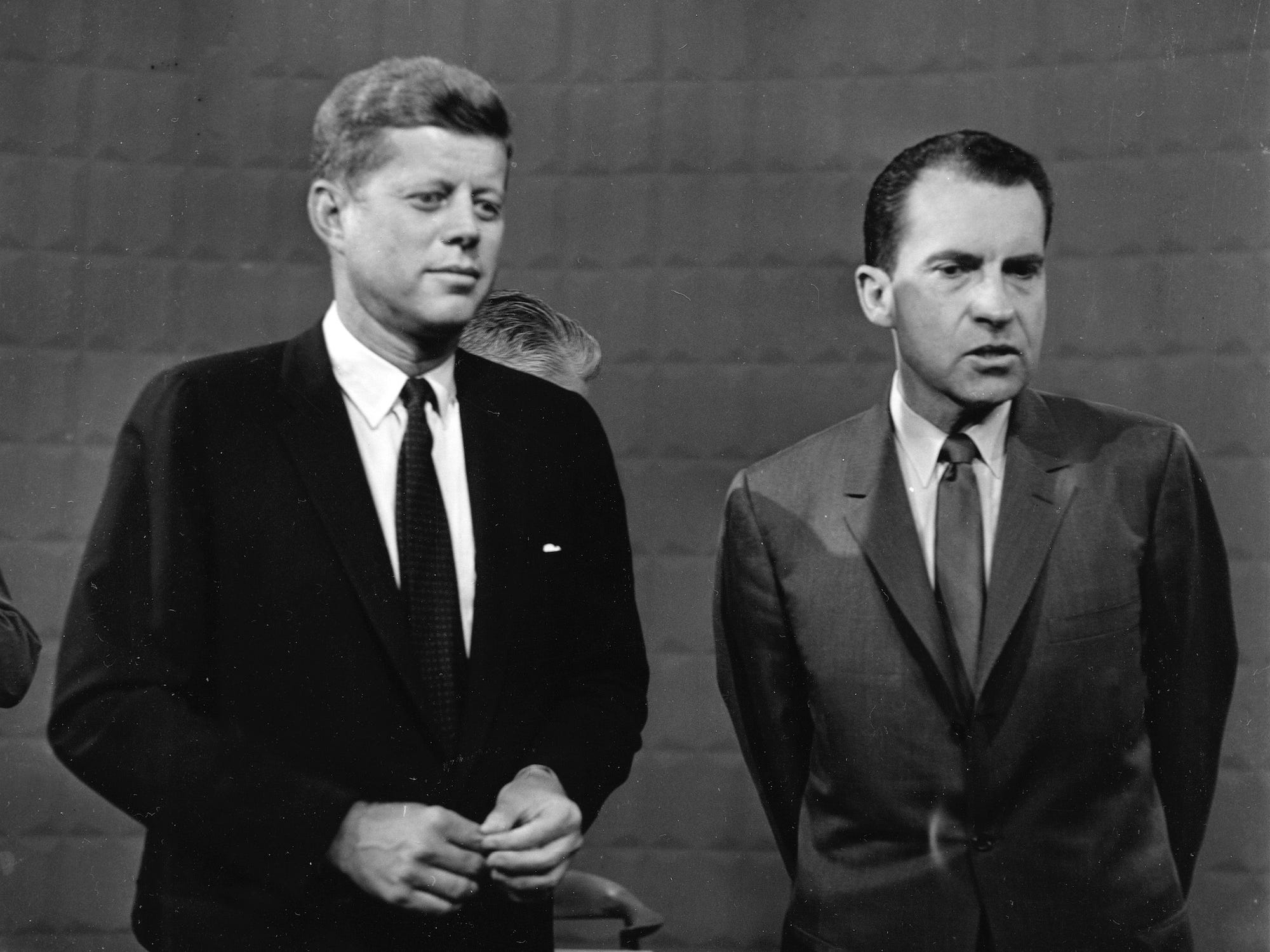
Quimby's appearance in his debate was based on Richard Nixon's (right) debate with John F. Kennedy (left) before the 1960 presidential election.

The episode features several references to the film All the President's Men, which chronicled Bob Woodward and Carl Bernstein's investigation of Watergate. These include the pull-out of Lisa looking over the voting records, the music, and the clandestine meeting with Smithers in a parking garage. The courtroom scene and Sideshow Bob's speech echo A Few Good Men (1992), including Jack Nicholson's speech with the line "You can't handle the truth!" Bob's sudden confession that he did rig the election was inspired by "every episode of Perry Mason".

Birch Barlow is a parody of American talk show host and political commentator Rush Limbaugh. Barlow mentions Colonel Oliver North, Officer Stacey Koon and advertising mascot Joe Camel as being "intelligent conservative[s], railroaded by our liberal justice system". The language spoken at Republican Party headquarters is inspired by Enochian, a language associated with occult and Satanic ceremonies.

The Springwood Minimum Security Prison is a parody of Allenwood Minimum Security Prison. When Lisa drives, she is listening to "St. Elmo's Fire" by John Parr, a choice David Mirkin found "very sad". Archie Comics characters Archie Andrews, Reggie Mantle, Moose Mason and Jughead Jones are shown throwing Homer on the Simpsons' lawn and warning him to "stay out of Riverdale!" Some of the deceased voters are Buddy Holly, Ritchie Valens and Jiles Richardson Jr. (The Big Bopper), who all died in a plane crash on February 3, 1959. The epitaph on Richardson's gravestone is "Gooooodbye, Baby!" a reference to the opening line of his song "Chantilly Lace" – "Hellooo Baby!" The Simpsons' home being demolished to make way for the "Matlock Expressway" is a reference to the opening of The Hitchhiker's Guide to the Galaxy. Sideshow Bob gives his acceptance speech underneath a giant poster with a picture of himself on it; this is a reference to the campaign speech scene in Citizen Kane.

== Themes and analysis ==
In Leaving Springfield, David L.G. Arnold notes that the episode is a satire on "society's lazy, uninformed attitude about the electoral process", and "a comment on the role in society of a cadre of elites (the Republican party) who see themselves as naturally suited to lead". The episode also portrays Republicans as willing to break the law in order to achieve this; in this case, Bob commits electoral fraud. This is most displayed in Bob's line: "Your guilty conscience may force you to vote Democratic, but deep down inside you secretly long for a cold-hearted Republican to lower taxes, brutalize criminals, and rule you like a king. That's why I did this: to protect you from yourselves."

Matthew Henry writes in the same book that the episode "well illustrates the battle of [political] ideologies [...] and its engagement with the politics of sexuality". He refers to the scene where Smithers intimates that Bob rigged the election; his motivation for whistleblowing is Bob's conservative policies, which disagree with his "choice of lifestyle", namely his homosexuality. Henry concludes the scene shows that conservative politics and homosexuality "cannot coexist" and that the scene marks the point where Smithers' sexuality became "public and overtly political".

Erik Adams writes that the episode "saves its greatest reserves of comedic contempt for a single entity—but it's an entity that represents multitudes. The subjects of the episode's most effective political takedowns aren't Republicans (though their local headquarters is portrayed as a dreamhouse from the Universal backlot circa Frankenstein) or Democrats (this in spite the fact that Springfield's resident 'Spendocrat' dynamo, Mayor 'Diamond' Joe Quimby, willingly admits to all questions of his character save for illiteracy—and even that's a recent development). No, the group that takes it on the chin most vigorously in this, The Simpsons' finest half-hour of political satire, is the American voting public."

== Reception ==
In its original broadcast, "Sideshow Bob Roberts" finished tied for 64th place in the weekly ratings for the week of October 3 to October 9, 1994, with a Nielsen rating of 8.6. It was the sixth highest rated show on the Fox network that week.

Gary Russell and Gareth Roberts, in I Can't Believe It's a Bigger and Better Updated Unofficial Simpsons Guide, noted the episode was: "A stunningly outspoken political satire that drew considerable disapproval from the Republican Party when it was aired."

Eric Reinagel, Brian Moritz, and John Hill of the Press & Sun-Bulletin named "Sideshow Bob Roberts" as the seventh best episode of the series. Thomas Rozwadowski of Green Bay Press-Gazette placed the episode among his list of the ten best episodes of the show which have lessons: "Corrupt politicians always get their comeuppance. Or not." He also highlighted Bob's campaign advert and Kent Brockman's line: "And the results are in. For Sideshow Bob, 100 percent. For Joe Quimby, 1 percent. And we remind you, there is a 1 percent margin of error."

=== Legacy ===
The episode has been used in a course at Columbia College Chicago. The course titled "The Simpsons as Satirical Authors" featured "Sideshow Bob Roberts" as one of the episodes screened for the "What's (Not) Wrong with America? Critiquing the U.S. Government" topic.

The episode contains the first use of the word "meh" on the show. Writer John Swartzwelder claims credit for introducing the word to the writers. "I originally heard the word from Howie Krakow, my creative director at Hurvis, Binzer & Churchill, in 1970 or 1971," Swartzwelder told The New Yorker in 2021. "He said it was the funniest word in the world. I don't know when it was invented, or by who, but I got the impression it was already very old when Howie told it to me." The word, which was later included in the Collins English Dictionary, is credited as being popularized by the show, principally following its usage in the season twelve episode "Hungry, Hungry Homer". In "Sideshow Bob Roberts", the word is used by the librarian who provides Lisa with the town's voting records, in response to her questioning their unclassified nature.

In 2019, following the Trump–Ukraine scandal, many supporters of President Donald Trump attempted to excuse his attempted blackmail of Volodymyr Zelenskyy by arguing attempted crimes are not illegal. In response, many detractors quoted Sideshow Bob's line in the episode, "Hah! Attempted murder? Now honestly, what is that? Do they give a Nobel prize for attempted chemistry? Do they?" In an editorial for The Washington Post, Bill Oakley commented, "It's hard to believe that the Sideshow Bob defense of Trump will be long-lived, as it fails to stand up to even the slightest scrutiny. It is literally a joke."
