= Larry McCarthy =

American political consultant

Lawrence C. "Larry" McCarthy (born 1952) is an American political consultant and media advisor to Republican Party (GOP) campaigns. He is best known as a master of the attack ad, having produced the infamous Willie Horton TV spot during the 1988 presidential election. He serves as President of McCarthy, Marcus, Hennings, Ltd., whose clients include American Crossroads and pro-Romney Super PAC Restore Our Future.

== Early life ==
McCarthy was born in Brooklyn, New York, in 1952 and was raised in Rockville, Maryland. He attended Gonzaga College High School in Washington, D.C. before graduating from Georgetown University in 1974.

== Career ==
=== Early campaigns ===
Upon graduating from Georgetown, McCarthy worked on the successful 1974 re-election campaign of Liberal Republican Senator Jacob K. Javits of New York. He later worked as an aide to John Heinz of Pennsylvania, serving as press secretary in the House of Representatives and political advisor to his successful 1976 Senate campaign. After several years running Heinz's Senate press office, McCarthy joined the staff of the National Republican Senatorial Committee where the Senator took the helm as Chairman for the 1980 campaign. During this cycle, Republicans gained 12 seats and took control of the United States Senate for the first time since 1954.

=== Ailes Communications ===
From 1981 to 1987, McCarthy worked as a senior executive for Ailes Communications under the mentorship of longtime GOP media strategist (and current Fox News CEO) Roger Ailes. During this period he assisted winning campaigns for Republican Senators Phil Gramm, Warren Rudman, Dan Quayle, Bob Kasten, Mitch McConnell, Gordon Humphrey and Dave Durenberger, and Governors George Deukmejian and Tom Kean.

=== 1988 presidential election ===
During the 1988 presidential election, while Ailes served as top media advisor to Vice President George H. W. Bush, McCarthy worked for the independent expenditure group "Americans for Bush" under the auspices of the National Security Political Action Committee (NSPAC.) Amid the emerging debate over Democratic Presidential nominee Michael Dukakis' use of prison furloughs during his tenure as Governor of Massachusetts, McCarthy and Americans for Bush released a TV advertisement using the story and likeness of convicted murderer and oft-furloughed inmate Willie Horton. Known as "Weekend Passes", the ad was limited to cable airtime, but was given significant earned media by the networks and other news outlets and became a flashpoint in the campaign. Despite the controversy over the ad and its alleged racial overtones, it was credited along with the Bush-Quayle-sanctioned "Revolving Door" ad for changing the dynamic of the election and marking the downfall of the Dukakis campaign.
