= Tom Turnipseed =

American politician and attorney (1936–2020)

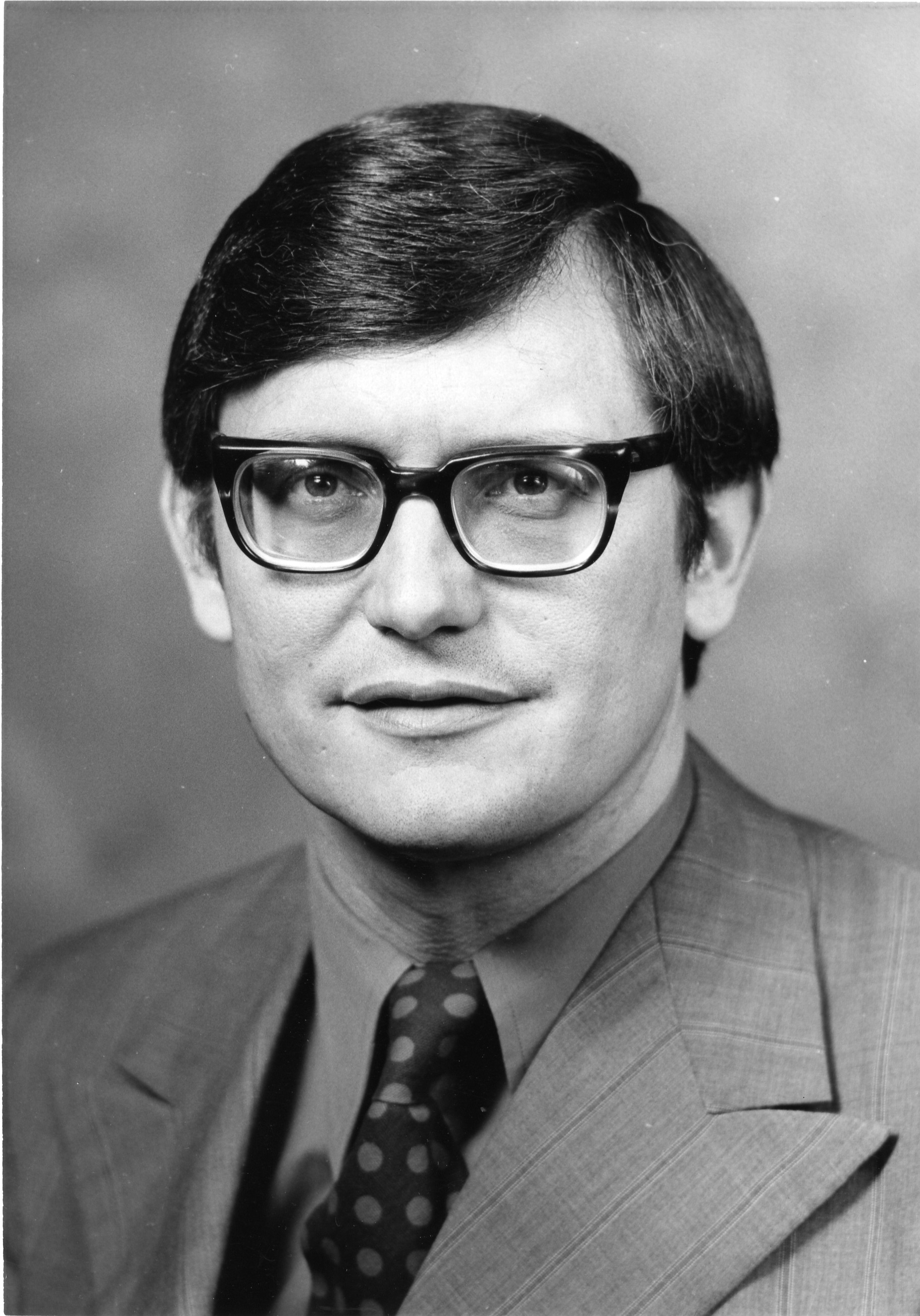

Member of the South Carolina Senate from the 8th district
- In office 1976–1980
- Succeeded by: Norma C. Russell

Personal details
- Born: George Thomas Turnipseed; August 27, 1936 Mobile, Alabama, U.S.
- Died: March 6, 2020 (aged 83) Columbia, South Carolina, U.S.
- Party: Democratic
- Spouse: Judith Davis (m. 1963)
- Children: 2
- Education: University of North Carolina; University of North Carolina School of Law
- Occupation: Attorney

George Thomas Turnipseed (August 27, 1936 – March 6, 2020) was an attorney and Democratic member of the South Carolina State Senate known for his liberal activism. Beginning in the late 1970s, he became active within the civil rights movement, which he had once opposed. He spoke and wrote extensively on civil rights and social justice.

== Background ==
Tom Turnipseed was born on August 27, 1936. A native of Mobile, Alabama, Turnipseed received his undergraduate and law degrees from the University of North Carolina at Chapel Hill, where he met his wife, Judith ("Judy"), while she was a graduate student at the institution. The couple wed in 1963 and had two children. Turnipseed died from respiratory failure in 2020.

== Career and political campaigns ==
In 1966, Turnipseed became the first executive director of the South Carolina Independent School Association, an accrediting agency set up to legitimate segregation academies. He played a role in the establishment of 43 academies, which in 1988 he characterized as a "terrible damn thing—the worst ... of all the racist things I have ever done."

Turnipseed was the executive director of the 1968 George Wallace presidential campaign, when the former governor of Alabama received 13.5 percent of the vote against Hubert Humphrey and Richard M. Nixon. After the American Independent Party campaign, Turnipseed, like Wallace, returned to the Democratic Party. Turnipseed soon embraced the party's liberal majority wing and joined Americans for Democratic Action, an interest group founded in 1947 by, among others, Humphrey, Walter Reuther, John Kenneth Galbraith, and Eleanor Roosevelt.

Turnipseed was elected to the South Carolina Senate, serving from 1976 to 1980. In 1980 he was the Democratic nominee for South Carolina's 2nd congressional district. He was defeated by incumbent Republican Floyd D. Spence, a former Democrat and lawyer from Columbia who benefited from the Ronald Reagan presidential campaign that year. In the Spence-Turnipseed race, Republican strategist Lee Atwater planted questions with reporters about Turnipseed's treatment as a teenager for depression, and repeatedly stated that he was "hooked up to jumper cables". Turnipseed had discussed his electroshock treatments in media interviews prior to the race, but the issue soon received much wider publicity due to Atwater's efforts and ultimately doomed his election bid. A decade later, as Atwater was battling a late stage cancer that eventually claimed his life, he wrote to Turnipseed to ask for forgiveness for his actions; Turnipseed accepted Atwater's apology and later attended his funeral.

In 1982, Turnipseed lost a Democratic primary runoff for Lieutenant Governor of South Carolina to Michael R. Daniel. Frye Gaillard of the Charlotte Observer described Turnipseed as "angry and shrill, and even some of the people who agreed with him finally wished he'd go away. He tried to change his style for [this] campaign, but it was apparently too late. That's a shame, however, because politics can do with a little more passion. And particularly so when that sense of being right comes, as Turnipseed's did, from a deeply felt knowledge of what it means to be wrong."

In 1998, Turnipseed ran unsuccessfully as a Democrat for Attorney General of South Carolina. Though he won twenty-six counties and finished with more than 46 percent of the vote, he was defeated by incumbent Republican Charlie Condon. However, the Republican governor, David Beasley, was unseated that year, and the GOP failed in its last attempt to unseat U.S. Senator Fritz Hollings.

== Activism ==
Turnipseed was the president of the South Carolina Trial Lawyers Association. He was the former board chairman of the interest group the Center for Democratic Renewal, formerly known as the National Anti-Klan Network, based in Atlanta. Turnipseed was the co-counsel for the Macedonia Baptist Church in Clarendon County, South Carolina. The church accused the Ku Klux Klan in the 1997 burning of its sanctuary and filed a civil suit against them for damages. In 1998, the African-American congregation won a $37 million jury verdict against the Klan. In 1998, Turnipseed received the Unitarian Universalist Association's highest honor, the Holmes Weatherly Award for the pursuit of social justice.

Of Anglo descent, Turnipseed was a board member of the South Carolina Hispanic Leadership Council, a statewide, non-profit organization founded to inform, advocate for, and educate, both the Hispanic community and the population at large, on issues affecting Hispanics.

Turnipseed had also been active in the environmental movement in South Carolina. He was the founding chairman of the Citizens' Local Environmental Action Network (CLEAN), a statewide umbrella and informational clearing house for local citizens' groups concerned with toxic waste dumps in their areas. Turnipseed argued that "environmental racism and classism" lead to toxic waste sites being located disproportionately in minority and poorer communities. He argued that toxic wastes constantly migrate through the air, water, and soil and eventually threaten all persons.

== Media host and author ==
Turnipseed hosted radio shows on WCAY, WCTG, WCEO, and WOIC. He also hosted a television show on WIS-TV. In both formats, his programs provided a forum for discussing diverse issues. He hosted community leaders, national and local leaders in politics and public affairs, sports, and arts, and entertainment. The Seed Show broad/web-cast live on WOIC, 1230AM (Air America) and seedshow.com every weekday from 8 to 9 a.m.

He spoke and wrote about political and human rights, traveling throughout the country. His articles and opinion pieces were published in The New York Times, The Washington Post, The Atlanta Journal-Constitution, the Minneapolis Star-Tribune, The Charlotte Observer, CounterPunch, The State, and other newspapers.

Turnipseed's essays were featured in several books, including Cast A Cold Eye and America's Opinion Writers. His essay, "Renewing The Spirit Of Dr. Martin Luther King Jr.: King Day at the Dome 2003", was featured in the third edition of Ancient Rhetorics for Contemporary Students, a college textbook by Sharon Crawley and Debra Hawhee, published in 2004 by Pearson/Longman.

Party political offices
Preceded by Dick Harpootlian	Democratic nominee for Attorney General of South Carolina; 1998	Succeeded by Stephen K. Benjamin
