= Boogie Man: The Lee Atwater Story =

- Directed by: Stefan Forbes
- Produced by: Stefan Forbes, Noland Walker, Tia Wou
- Starring: Eric Alterman
- Distributed by: Interpositive Media LLC
- Release date: 2008
- Running time: 86 mins
- Country: United States
- Language: English

Boogie Man: The Lee Atwater Story is a 2008 U.S. documentary on the controversial campaign tactics used by Lee Atwater, while working on George H. W. Bush's 1988 presidential election campaign, and how those tactics have transformed presidential campaigns in the United States.

In an independent theatrical release from InterPositive Media, the film was a Critic's Pick in both The New York Times and The Washington Post, screened at the 2008 Democratic and Republican National Conventions, played 40 American cities theatrically in the fall of 2008 and was number seven in nationwide per-screen average the weekend of its release.

== Plot ==
Using extensive interviews with colleagues, opponents and friends and archival footage, the film follows the principal's influential career, working with Karl Rove, Ronald Reagan, Roger Stone, Paul Manafort and others, culminating in the defining Bush 1988 presidential campaign and its aftermath.

== Critical reception ==
The film won the national Edward R. Murrow Award, a 2009 Polk Award for Excellence in Journalism, and the Chris Award at the Columbus International Film & Video Festival. It was nominated for the WGA Award for Best Theatrical Documentary. Director Stefan Forbes received the Emerging Filmmaker Award from the International Documentary Association.

The film received wide acclaim from reviewers. Some conservatives have criticized the film for what they say is left-wing bias. However, many conservatives have praised the film for its keen insight into American culture wars, with Roger Stone calling the film "A balanced portrait of Atwater’s quest for power and celebrity...Lee Atwater was a mastermind and a rogue, a genius and charlatan, a visionary and a liar...Boogie Man captures all of this and is must viewing for anyone who seeks to understand my former partner, Lee Atwater." In The Washington Times, Christian Toto wrote “Intense...compelling...will touch hearts on both sides of the aisle.”

The film has been cited in many political science books, and it often is taught in university political science classes.

The Washington Post called it "one of the best political films ever."

== Other releases ==
The documentary was retitled as Dirty Tricks: The Man Who Got the Bushes Elected when it was broadcast in the United Kingdom on BBC Four.

On November 11, 2008, the series Frontline broadcast a slightly shortened version of the documentary.
