= Red, Hot and Blue =

Musical composed by Cole Porter

Red Hot and Blue
- 1936 original broadway production playbill cover
- Music: Cole Porter
- Lyrics: Cole Porter
- Book: Howard Lindsay; Russel Crouse
- Productions: 1936 Broadway

Red, Hot and Blue is a musical with music and lyrics by Cole Porter and a book by Howard Lindsay and Russel Crouse. It premiered on Broadway in 1936 and introduced the popular song "It's De-Lovely," sung by Ethel Merman and Bob Hope.

The musical has no connection to the 1949 film musical of the same name with songs by Frank Loesser.

Today it may be most famous as one of the first instances of creative resolution of top billing on posters and marquees. Stars Jimmy Durante and Ethel Merman refused to accept second billing. The producers devised a compromise in which their names formed an X-shaped cross, drawing the observer’s eye in two directions. The third star, Bob Hope, settled for his name in bold under the cross.

== Synopsis ==
Nails O'Reilly Duquesne is a newly wealthy young widow. Loud and brassy, Nails is a former manicurist. She organizes a benefit for her favorite cause, the rehabilitation of ex-convicts. Together with her sidekick (an "ex-con" himself), Policy Pinkle, and her "square" boyfriend, lawyer Bob Hale, she embarks on a nationwide search for Bob's old girlfriend, which is really the reason for the enterprise. The girlfriend, 18 years earlier, had sat upon a hot waffle iron and so had a unique "imprint". However, the national lottery that Nails starts gets the attention of the Finance Committee, and they wind up in Washington DC in an even more complicated situation. The Supreme Court declares the lottery unconstitutional, because it would benefit the people.

== Songs ==
Act 1

- "At Ye Olde Coffee Shoppe in Cheyenne" – Reporters and Prison Band
- "It's a Great Life"/ "Perennial Debutantes" – Guests and Debutantes
- "Ours" – Anne Westcott, Sonny Hadley, Grace, "Fingers" and Girls
- "Down in the Depths on the 90th Floor" – Nails O'Reilly Duquesne
- "Carry On" – Sonny Hadley, Reporters and Muggs
- "You've Got Something" – Bob Hale and Nails
- "It's De-Lovely" – Nails and Bob
- "A Little Skipper from Heaven Above" – Policy Pinkle, Muggs and Reporters
- "Five Hundred Million" – Vivian, Betty and Debutantes
- "Ridin' High" – Nails and Ensemble

Act 2

- "We're About to Start Big Rehearsin'" – Ensemble
- "Hymn to Hymen" – Ensemble
- "What a Great Pair We'll Be" – Anne and Sonny
- "The Ozarks Are Callin' Me Home" – Nails
- "Red, Hot and Blue" – Nails and Ensemble

Cut Songs

- "You're a Bad Influence On Me" [dropped soon after the New York opening; replaced by "The Ozarks Are Callin' Me Home"]
- "When Your Troubles Have Started" [dropped during the Boston tryout]
- "Goodbye, Little Dream, Goodbye" [dropped during the Boston tryout; replaced by "Down in the Depths"; originally written for the film Born to Dance]
- "Bertie and Gertie" [dropped during rehearsals]
- "Who But You?" [unused]
- "That's the News I'm Waiting to Hear" [unused]
- "Where?" [unused]
- "Lonely Star" [unused]

== History ==
During the out-of-town tryouts, according to Cole Porter's biography, Cole Porter: A Biography by Charles Schwartz, the book was too long and did not blend with the music. Further the producer Vinton Freedley made "numerous suggestions for overhauling the show", which were accepted by all except Porter. Porter initially told Freedley to communicate through his agent, but finally relented. Additional conflict had arisen before the show's tryouts, when Freedley had assembled the cast and creative team behind the musical Anything Goes, hoping to repeat that show's success. William Gaxton was part of that cast, but withdrew because Ethel Merman's part was so large and Bob Hope was cast. The next conflict came over billing for Jimmy Durante and Merman, which was resolved by having their names crisscrossed above the title.

The musical was first titled But Millions! and then Wait for Baby!.

Porter had written the song "It's De-Lovely" for the film Born to Dance but it was not used. He turned it into a romantic duet for Merman and Bob Hope, in which they trace their romance from first kiss to marriage to a baby.

== Productions ==
Red, Hot and Blue had its pre-Broadway tryout in Boston at the Colonial Theatre, starting on October 7, 1936, and the Shubert Theatre in New Haven starting on October 19, 1936.

The musical premiered on Broadway on October 29, 1936 at the Alvin Theatre (now the Neil Simon Theatre) and closed on April 10, 1937 after 183 performances. Directed by Howard Lindsay with choreography by George Hale, it starred Ethel Merman as Nails O'Reilly Duquesne, Jimmy Durante as Policy Pinkle, and Bob Hope as Bob Hale.

The Equity Library Theater (New York City) production ran in January 1984.

The "Discovering Lost Musicals Charitable Trust" series staged the show at Barbican Centre Cinema 1 in 1994, with a cast that included Louise Gold and Don Fellows.

Goodspeed Opera House in East Haddam, Connecticut mounted a revival in the fall of 2000 featuring a revised book by director Michael Leeds. The production starred Debbie Gravitte (Tony Award winner for "Jerome Robbins' Broadway") as Nails Duquesne, Peter Reardon as Bob Hale, and Ben Lipitz as Policy Pinkle. Previews began October 13 with the official opening on November 3. The production ran through December 31. Along with Leeds, the creative team included Andy Blankenbuehler (choreographer), Michael O'Flaherty (musical director), Ken Foy (sets), Ann Hould-Ward (costumes), and Ken Billington (lighting). The rest of the cast included Brian Barry (Rats), Robin Baxter (Peaches), Lesley Blumenthal, Randy Bobish (Bugs), Dianna Bush (Olive), Paul Carlin, Kevin Covert (Leonard), Beth Glover, Billy Hartung (Fingers), Jessica Kostival (Grace), Stephanie Kurtzuba (Jane), Kristin Maloney (Helen), Steve Luker (Eagle Eye), Jody Madaras, Trish Reidy (Vivian), Vince Trani, Matt Williams (Coyote), and Darlene Wilson (Barbara).

A production in 2009 by George Productions had Richard Steven Horvitz as Policy Pinkle, Allyson Turner as Nails and Kyle Nudo as Bob Hale.

== Legacy ==
Redhot & Blue, a singing group at Yale University (Cole Porter's alma mater), is named after this musical. The group still performs the title song of the musical.

== Response ==
Porter and Merman were mutually appreciative of each other's talents. Porter praised her delivery, professionalism, ability to memorize lyric changes, and said: "She has the finest enunciation of any American singer I know. She has a sense of rhythm which few can equal and her feeling for comedy is so intuitive that she can get every value out of a line without over-stressing". Merman said, "I'd rather sing his songs than those by any other writer".

The New York Post was indifferent to the show, but highly praised Merman and Durante: "What 'Red, Hot and Blue' would be without them is a question in which we have no interest. That it would be hopeless we have no doubt. That, apart from their contribution to it, it is a very inferior musical comedy we are bound to admit."

Porter's songs were criticized by critics and the show had a limited run. According to theatre writer Stanley Green in his book The World of Musical Comedy, the show was not a success, and the major problem was the book, "...a fairly elementary piece..." Green said that Porter's songs were more "inspired", noting that Merman sang the song "Down in the Depths" in "a gold lamé gown illuminated by a single gold spotlight, brilliantly heightened the heroine's loneliness by contrasting it with her surroundings".
