= Lee Atwater =

American political consultant and strategist (1951–1991)

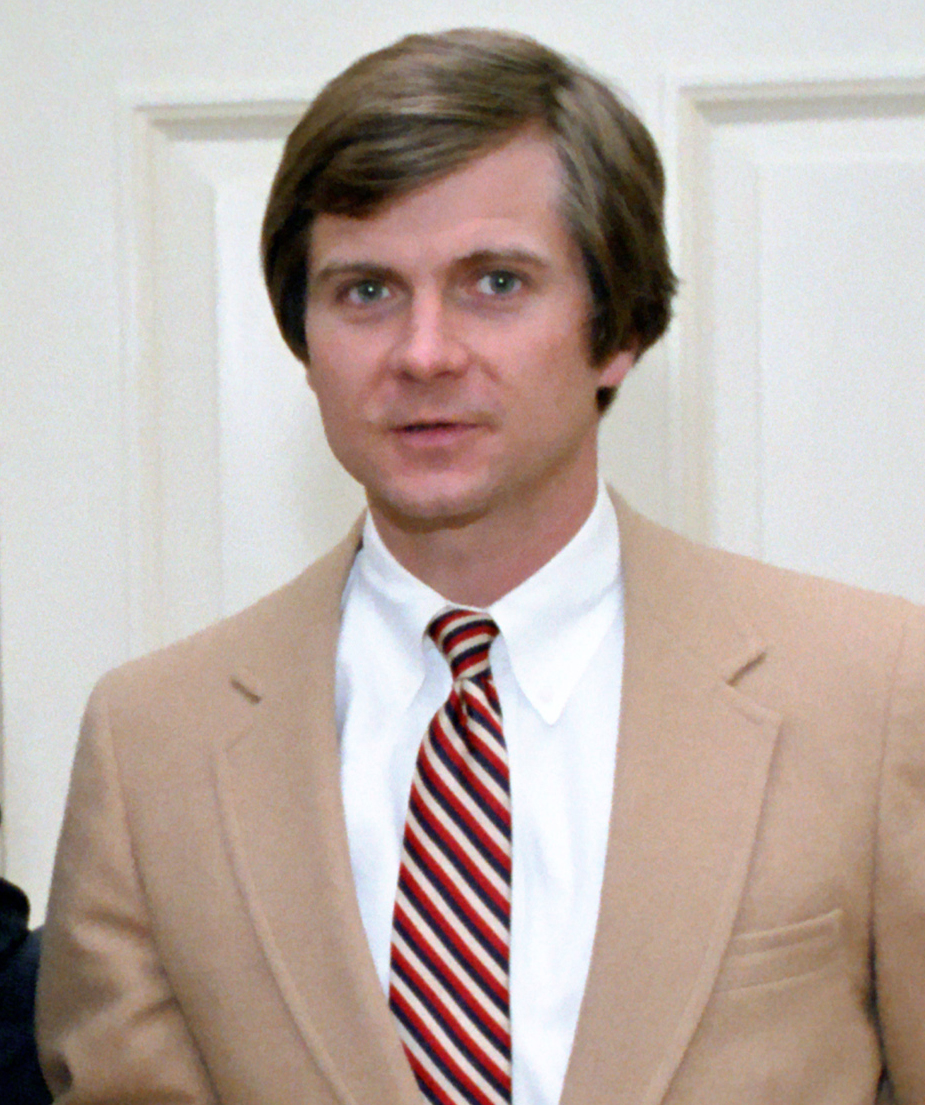
- Atwater in 1983

53rd Chair of the Republican National Committee
- In office January 18, 1989 – January 25, 1991
- Preceded by: Frank Fahrenkopf
- Succeeded by: Clay Yeutter

Personal details
- Born: Harvey LeRoy Atwater; February 27, 1951 Atlanta, Georgia, U.S.
- Died: March 29, 1991 (aged 40) Washington, D.C., U.S.
- Party: Republican
- Spouse: Sally Dunbar (m. 1978)
- Children: 3
- Education: Newberry College (BA); University of South Carolina (MA)

Harvey LeRoy "Lee" Atwater (February 27, 1951 – March 29, 1991) was an American political consultant and strategist for the Republican Party. He was an adviser to Republican U.S. presidents Ronald Reagan and George H. W. Bush and chairman of the Republican National Committee. Atwater aroused controversy through his aggressive campaign tactics, especially the Southern strategy.

== Early life ==
Atwater was born on February 27, 1951, in Atlanta, Georgia, the son of Alma "Toddy" (Page), a school teacher, and Harvey Dillard Atwater, an insurance adjustor. He had two siblings, Ann and Joe, and grew up in Aiken, South Carolina. When Lee was five, his three-year-old brother, Joe, died of third-degree burns when he pulled a deep fryer full of hot oil onto himself.

As a teenager in Columbia, South Carolina, Atwater played guitar in a rock band, The Upsetters Revue. Even at the height of his political power, he would often play concerts in clubs and church basements, solo or with B.B. King, in the Washington, D.C., area. He released an album called Red Hot & Blue on Curb Records, featuring Carla Thomas, Isaac Hayes, Sam Moore, Chuck Jackson, and King. In the Los Angeles Times of April 5, 1990, Robert Hilburn wrote about the album: "The most entertaining thing about this ensemble salute to spicy Memphis-style 1950s and 1960s R&B is the way it lets you surprise your friends. Play a selection such as 'Knock on Wood' or 'Bad Boy' for someone without identifying the singer, then watch their eyes bulge when you reveal that it's the controversial national chairman of the Republican Party, Lee Atwater." During the 1960s, Atwater briefly played backup guitar for Percy Sledge.

Atwater attended W. J. Keenan Junior High School where he developed a reputation as a class clown and poor student. This frustrated his parents, and so they sent him to Fork Union Military Academy for his tenth grade year, where his grades saw an improvement. However, he wanted to move back to Columbia to attend A.C. Flora High School, and after lobbying his parents for the change, they obliged, and Atwater would spend his eleventh and twelfth grade years there before graduating in 1969. In 1973, Atwater graduated from Newberry College, a small private Lutheran institution in Newberry, South Carolina, where he was a member of the Alpha Tau Omega fraternity and earned a Bachelor of Arts degree in history. At Newberry, Atwater served as the governor of the South Carolina Student Legislature. He earned a Master of Arts degree in communications from the University of South Carolina in 1977.

== Political career ==
During the 1970s and the 1980 election, Atwater rose to prominence in the South Carolina Republican Party, actively participating in the campaigns of Governor Carroll Campbell and Senator Strom Thurmond. During his years in South Carolina, Atwater became well known for managing hard-edged campaigns based on emotional wedge issues.

=== 1980 and 1984 elections ===
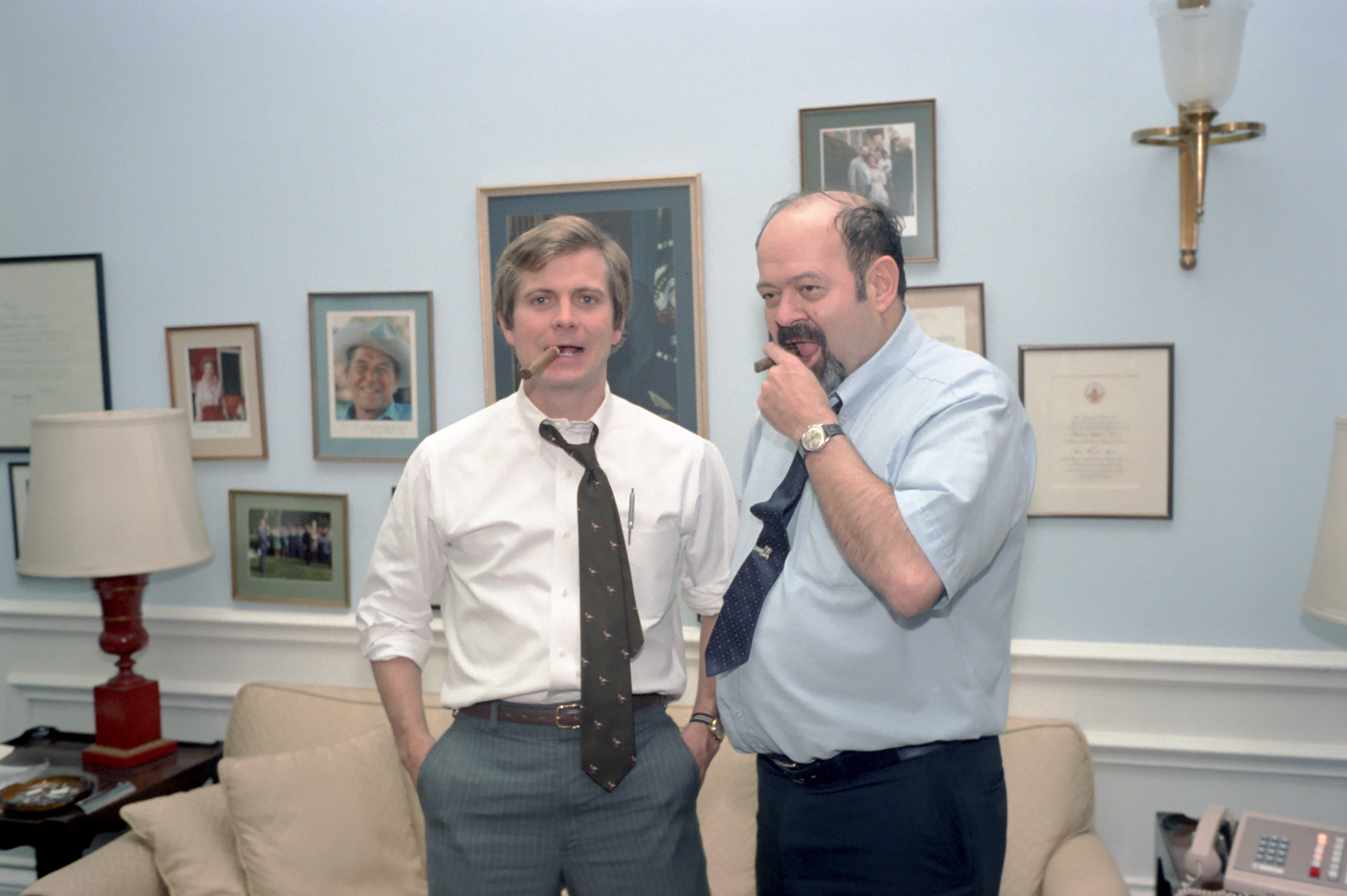
Atwater talking with Lyn Nofziger in Nofziger's office in the White House on January 21, 1982

Atwater's aggressive tactics were first demonstrated during the 1980 Congressional campaigns. He was a campaign consultant to Republican incumbent Floyd Spence when he ran for Congress against Democratic nominee Tom Turnipseed. Atwater's tactics in that campaign included push polling in the form of fake surveys by so-called independent pollsters, to inform white suburbanites that Turnipseed was a member of the NAACP. He also sent out last-minute letters from Senator Thurmond telling voters that Turnipseed would disarm the United States, and turn it over to liberals and Communists. At a press briefing, Atwater planted a fake reporter who rose and said, "We understand that Turnipseed has had psychiatric treatment". Atwater later told reporters off the record that Turnipseed "got hooked up to jumper cables", referring to electroconvulsive therapy that Turnipseed underwent as a teenager. Spence went on to win the race.

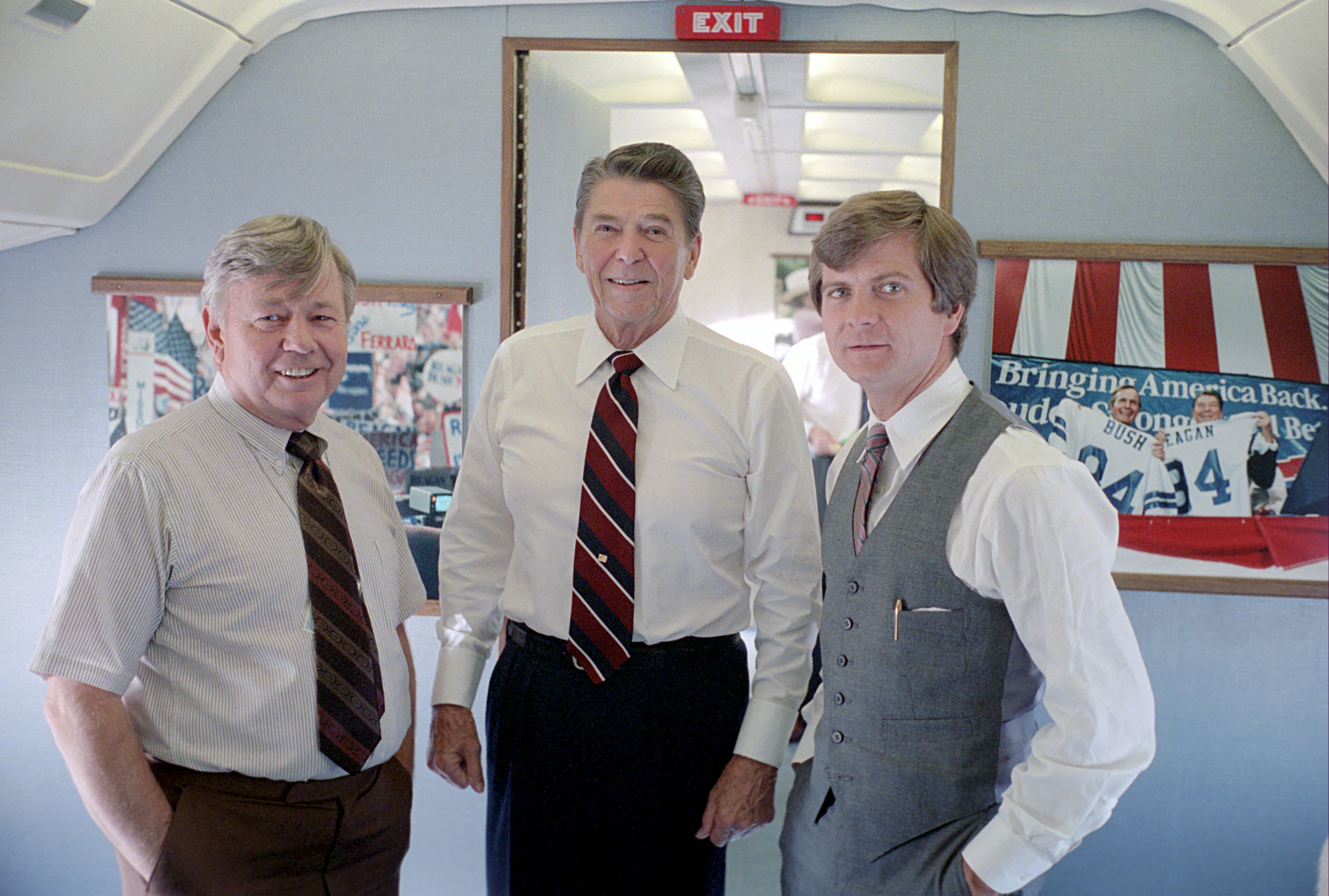
President Ronald Reagan during a trip via Air Force One to Alabama with Lee Atwater and Stu Spencer on October 15, 1984

After the 1980 election, Atwater went to Washington and became an aide in the Ronald Reagan administration, working under political director Ed Rollins. In 1984, Rollins managed Reagan's re-election campaign, and Atwater became the campaign's deputy director and political director. Rollins mentioned Atwater's work several times in his 1996 book Bare Knuckles and Back Rooms. He stated that Atwater ran a dirty tricks operation against Democratic vice-presidential nominee Geraldine Ferraro, including publicizing the fact that Ferraro's parents had been indicted for numbers running in the 1940s. Rollins described Atwater as "ruthless", "Ollie North in civilian clothes", and someone who "just had to drive in one more stake".

The day after the 1984 presidential election, Atwater became a senior partner at the political consulting firm of Black, Manafort, Stone and Kelly.

During his years in Washington, Atwater became aligned with Vice President George H. W. Bush, who chose Atwater to manage his 1988 presidential campaign.

=== "Southern strategy" ===
As a member of the Reagan administration in 1981, Atwater gave an anonymous interview to political scientist Alexander P. Lamis. Part of the interview was printed in Lamis' book The Two-Party South, later reprinted in Southern Politics in the 1990s with Atwater's name revealed. Bob Herbert reported on the interview in the October 6, 2005, issue of The New York Times. On November 13, 2012, The Nation magazine released a 42-minute audio recording of the interview. James Carter IV, grandson of former president Jimmy Carter, had asked and been granted access to the tapes by Lamis' widow. Early in the interview, Atwater argued that Reagan did not need to make racial appeals, suggesting that Reagan's issues transcended the racial prism of the 1968 "Southern Strategy":

Atwater: But Reagan did not have to do a southern strategy for two reasons. Number one, race was not a dominant issue. And number two, the mainstream issues in this campaign had been, quote, southern issues since way back in the sixties. So Reagan goes out and campaigns on the issues of economics and of national defense. The whole campaign was devoid of any kind of racism, any kind of reference. And I'll tell you another thing you all need to think about, that even surprised me, is the lack of interest, really, the lack of knowledge right now in the South among white voters about the Voting Rights Act.

Later in the interview, Atwater was questioned about the implicitly racist aspects of the "New Southern Strategy" carried out by the Reagan campaign:

Atwater: As to the whole Southern strategy that Harry S. Dent, Sr. and others put together in 1968, opposition to the Voting Rights Act would have been a central part of keeping the South. Now you don't have to do that. All that you need to do to keep the South is for Reagan to run in place on the issues that he's campaigned on since 1964, and that's fiscal conservatism, balancing the budget, cut taxes, you know, the whole cluster.

Questioner: But the fact is, isn't it, that Reagan does get to the Wallace voter and to the racist side of the Wallace voter by doing away with legal services, by cutting down on food stamps?

Atwater: Y'all don't quote me on this. You start out in 1954 by saying, "Nigger, nigger, nigger". By 1968, you can't say "nigger"—that hurts you. Backfires. So you say stuff like forced busing, states' rights and all that stuff. You're getting so abstract now [that] you're talking about cutting taxes, and all these things you're talking about are totally economic things and a byproduct of them is [that] blacks get hurt worse than whites. And subconsciously maybe that is part of it. I'm not saying that. But I'm saying that if it is getting that abstract, and that coded, that we are doing away with the racial problem one way or the other. You follow me—because obviously sitting around saying, "We want to cut this", is much more abstract than even the busing thing, and a hell of a lot more abstract than "Nigger, nigger". So, any way you look at it, race is coming on the back-burner.

=== 1988 election ===
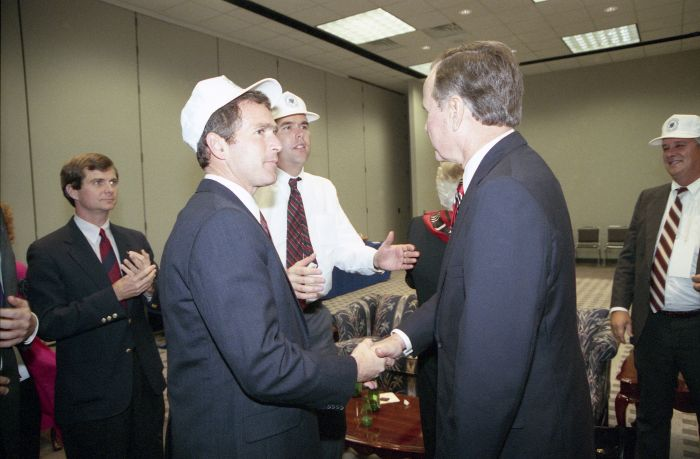
Atwater (at left) with the Bush family on Election Night 1988

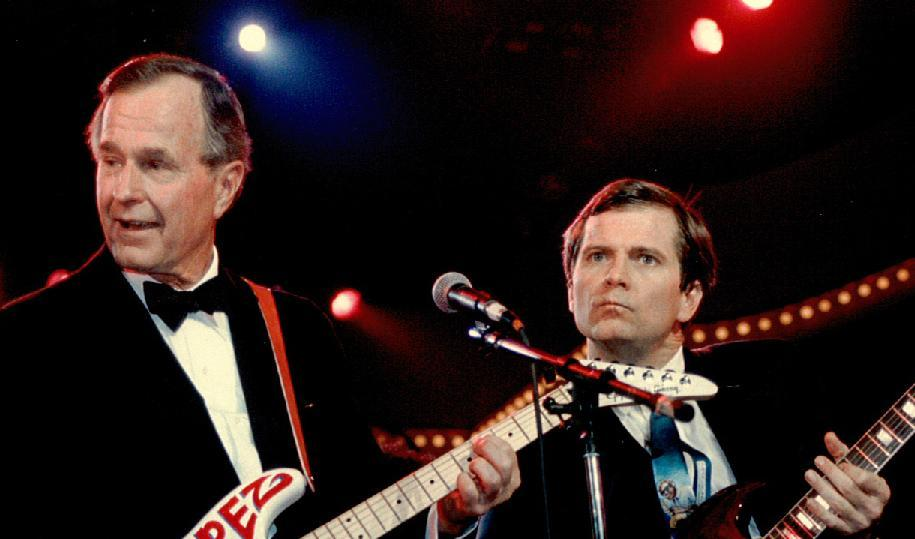
Lee Atwater "jams" with President George H. W. Bush at Inaugural festivity on January 21, 1989

Atwater's most noteworthy campaign was the 1988 presidential election, when he served as campaign manager for Republican nominee George H. W. Bush.

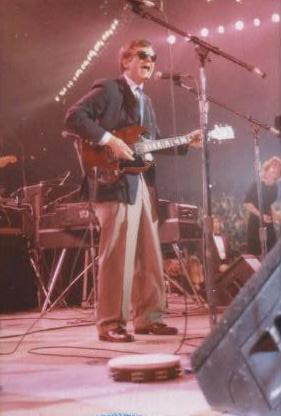
Atwater performing at the inauguration of George H. W. Bush in 1989

Democratic nominee Michael Dukakis supported a felon furlough program originally begun in 1972, under Republican Governor Francis Sargent. In 1976, the Massachusetts legislature passed a measure to ban furloughs for first-degree murderers, but Governor Dukakis vetoed the bill. Soon afterward, Willie Horton, who was serving a life sentence for first-degree murder for stabbing a boy to death during a robbery, was released on weekend furlough, during which he kidnapped a young couple, tortured the man, and repeatedly raped the woman. Horton then became the centerpiece of Atwater's ad campaign against Dukakis.

The issue of furlough for first-degree murderers was originally brought up by Democratic candidate Al Gore, during a presidential primary debate. However, Gore never referred specifically to Horton. Dukakis had tried to portray himself as a moderate politician from the liberal state of Massachusetts. The Horton ad campaign only reinforced the public's general opinion that Dukakis was too liberal, which helped Bush overcome Dukakis' 17-percent lead in early public opinion polls, and win both the electoral and popular vote by landslide margins.

Although Atwater approved of the use of the Willie Horton issue, the Bush campaign never ran any commercial with Horton's picture, running a similar but generic ad instead. The original commercial was produced by Americans for Bush, an independent group managed by Larry McCarthy, and Republicans benefited from the coverage it attracted in the national media. Referring to Dukakis, Atwater declared that he would "strip the bark off the little bastard" and "make Willie Horton his running mate". Atwater's challenge was to counter the "where was George?" campaign slogan Democrats were using in an effort to create an impression that Bush was a relatively inexperienced and unaccomplished candidate. Furthermore, Bush faced criticism from the Republican base, who recalled his pro-choice positions from the 1980 primary. Additionally, it was believed that the harder the campaign attacked Dukakis's liberal positions, the larger Dukakis's base turnout would become.

During the election, a number of allegations were made in the media about Dukakis' personal life, including the unsubstantiated claim that his wife, Kitty, had burned a United States flag to protest the Vietnam War, and that Dukakis had been treated for a mental illness. In the film Boogie Man: The Lee Atwater Story, Robert Novak revealed that Atwater personally tried, but failed, to get him to spread these mental-health rumors.

The 1988 Bush campaign overcame a 17-point deficit in midsummer polls to win 40 states.

During the campaign, future President George W. Bush took an office across the hall from Atwater, where his job was to serve as his father's eyes and ears. Bush wrote in his autobiography, "I was an allegiance enforcer and a listening ear." In her memoir, Barbara Bush said Atwater and the younger Bush (whom Atwater called "Junior") became "great friends."

=== RNC Chairman ===
After the election, Atwater was named chairman of the Republican National Committee. Shortly after Atwater took over the RNC, Jim Wright, a Democrat, was forced to resign as Speaker of the House and was succeeded by fellow Democrat Tom Foley.

On the day that Foley officially became speaker, the RNC began circulating a memo to Republican congresspeople and state party chairpeople called "Tom Foley: Out of the Liberal Closet". The memo compared Foley's voting record with that of openly gay Congressman Barney Frank, with a subtle implication that Foley, too, was gay. It had been crafted by RNC communications director Mark Goodin and by House Minority Whip Newt Gingrich. Gingrich had already been attempting to convince several reporters to print the rumor. The memo was harshly condemned by both political parties. For instance, Republican Senate leader Bob Dole said in the Senate chamber, "This is not politics. This is garbage".

Atwater initially defended the memo, calling it "no big deal" and "factually accurate". However, some days later, he claimed that he had not approved it. Under pressure from Bush, Atwater fired Goodin, replacing him with B. Jay Cooper.

Following Bush's victory, Atwater focused on organizing a public relations campaign against Arkansas governor Bill Clinton. Atwater viewed Clinton as a serious threat to Bush in the 1992 presidential election. At the time Atwater became ill in 1990, he was supporting the bid of Representative Tommy Robinson to gain the Republican gubernatorial nomination to oppose Clinton that fall. Robinson lost the primary to former Arkla Gas CEO Sheffield Nelson. In an indication of how much importance Atwater and the RNC placed on Robinson's bid, Missouri's John Ashcroft, attended an Arkansas event where he was scheduled to endorse Robinson, only to discover that he had a primary opponent. Up to that point, when he met Nelson, Ashcroft thought Robinson was running unopposed. After Atwater fell ill, Robinson's RGA support evaporated.

In 1989, Atwater became a member of the historically black Howard University Board of Trustees. The university gained national attention when students rose up in protest against Atwater's appointment. Student activists disrupted Howard's 122nd anniversary celebrations and eventually occupied the university's administration building. Within days, both Atwater and Howard's president, James E. Cheek, resigned.

Also in 1989, Atwater strongly criticized the candidacy of David Duke for the Louisiana House of Representatives. He said: "David Duke is not a Republican as far as I am concerned...He is a pretender, a charlatan, and a political opportunist who is looking for any organization he can find to legitimate his views of racial and religious bigotry and intolerance...We repudiate him and his views and we are taking steps to see that he is disenfranchised from our party."

== Musical career ==
Lee Atwater
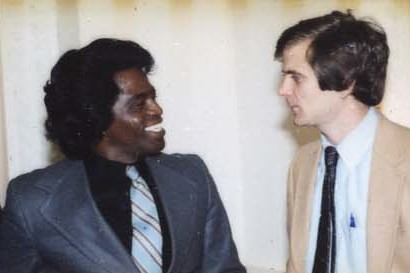
- Atwater with James Brown in 1981

Background information
- Genres: Rock, blues
- Occupations: Singer, guitarist
- Instruments: Vocals, guitar
- Years active: 1960s–1991

In 1988, Atwater and several friends, including Don Sundquist, founded a restaurant named Red Hot & Blue in Arlington, Virginia. The restaurant, which has since grown into a chain, served Memphis BBQ and played Memphis blues music in the dining room.

Atwater recorded a 1990 album with B.B. King and others on Curb Records, titled Red Hot & Blue. He also performed with Paul Shaffer and his band in an episode of Late Night with David Letterman. The title track from the album earned Atwater a nomination for the Grammy Award for Best Contemporary Blues Recording at the 33rd Annual Grammy Awards in 1991.

== Personal life ==
=== Marriage and children ===
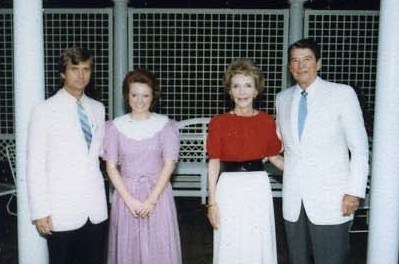
Atwater and his wife, Sally, with President Ronald Reagan and his wife, First Lady Nancy Reagan in 1984

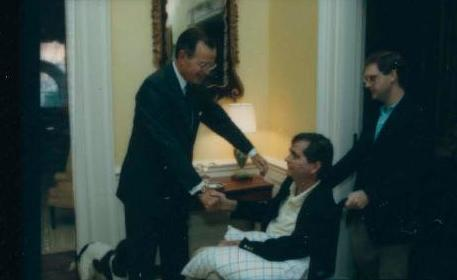
Atwater greeting President George H. W. Bush in 1990

Atwater married Sally Dunbar in 1978. They had three daughters, Sara Lee, Ashley Page, and Sally Theodosia. His widow ran for Superintendent of Education for South Carolina in 2014. She was endorsed by former President George H. W. Bush.

=== Illness ===
On March 5, 1990, Atwater suffered a seizure during a fundraising breakfast. Doctors discovered a grade 3 astrocytoma, an aggressive form of brain cancer, in his right parietal lobe. He underwent interstitial implant radiation – then a new treatment – at Montefiore Medical Center in New York City, followed by conventional radiation therapy at George Washington University Hospital in Washington, D.C. The treatment left him paralyzed on his left side, disabled his tone discrimination, and made his face and body swollen. In January 1991 he finally resigned from his chairmanship of the Republican National Committee.

=== Conversion to Catholicism and repentance ===
In the months after the severity of his illness became apparent, Atwater said he had converted to Catholicism, with the aid of Fr. John Hardon. (The Atwater family's pastor, James P. Rush, D. Min., disputed this in an editorial, claiming that Lee was under heavy sedation when he allegedly converted to Roman Catholicism and that he later renounced his conversion altogether.) In an act of repentance, Atwater issued a number of public and written letters to individuals to whom he had been opposed during his political career. In a June 28, 1990, letter to Tom Turnipseed, he stated, "It is very important to me that I let you know that out of everything that has happened in my career, one of the low points remains the so-called 'jumper cable' episode", adding, "My illness has taught me something about the nature of humanity, love, brotherhood, and relationships that I never understood, and probably never would have. So, from that standpoint, there is some truth and good in everything." Turnipseed accepted Atwater's apology and later attended his funeral.

In a February 1991 article for Life, Atwater wrote:

My illness helped me to see that what was missing in society is what was missing in me: a little heart, a lot of brotherhood. The 1980s were about acquiring – acquiring wealth, power, prestige. I know. I acquired more wealth, power, and prestige than most. But you can acquire all you want and still feel empty. What power wouldn't I trade for a little more time with my family? What price wouldn't I pay for an evening with friends? It took a deadly illness to put me eye to eye with that truth, but it is a truth that the country, caught up in its ruthless ambitions and moral decay, can learn on my dime. I don't know who will lead us through the '90s, but they must be made to speak to this spiritual vacuum at the heart of American society, this tumor of the soul.

In the article Atwater apologized to Michael Dukakis for the "naked cruelty" of the 1988 presidential election campaign.

In the 2008 documentary, Boogie Man: The Lee Atwater Story, Ed Rollins stated:

[Atwater] was telling this story about how a Living Bible was what was giving him faith and I said to Mary [Matalin], "I really, sincerely hope that he found peace". She said, "Ed, when we were cleaning up his things afterwards, the Bible was still wrapped in the cellophane and had never been taken out of the package", which just told you everything there was. He was spinning right to the end.

=== Unfinished memoir and other collected papers ===
When Lee's widow, Sally, died in 2021, she left his papers, including an unfinished handwritten memoir, to the University of South Carolina.

== Death ==
Atwater was diagnosed with a brain tumor in 1990 and underwent chemotherapy and radiation therapy at Montefiore Medical Center. He died on March 29, 1991 at the age of 40.

Funeral services were held at Trinity Episcopal Cathedral in Atwater's final place of residence, Columbia, South Carolina. Hundreds of friends, opponents, and admirers attended, including prominent politicians and major celebrities such as Strom Thurmond and James Brown; President Bush, however, was on vacation in Florida and did not attend. A memorial service was held at the Washington National Cathedral on April 4, 1991. This service was also well attended, with an estimated 1,500 mourners present; Bush attended but did not speak. Atwater, dressed in his jogging outfit and clutching his album, Red Hot & Blue, was buried in Greenlawn Memorial Park, Columbia, South Carolina – minutes from his childhood home.

== Legacy ==
=== Reflections ===
Sidney Blumenthal has speculated that, had Atwater lived, he would have run a stronger re-election campaign for Bush than the president's unsuccessful 1992 effort against Bill Clinton and Ross Perot.

=== Tributes ===
Sally Atwater delivered opening remarks commemorating her husband on the first day of the 1992 GOP Convention; later that day, B.B. King performed a concert organized as a tribute to Atwater.

=== Scholarships and foundation ===
In February 1991, mere weeks before Atwater succumbed to his illness, Strom Thurmond endowed Newberry College with funds to establish a scholarship in his honor.

Several months after Atwater died, the University of South Carolina raised $200,000 in honor of Atwater and Thurmond to establish a graduate fellowship in their names. The inaugural J. Strom Thurmond/Lee Atwater Fellowship in American Politics was awarded the following year. The Fellowship is still active and listed on USC's website.

In December 1991, associates of Atwater published a notice of incorporation in The State for The H. Lee Atwater Foundation, Inc., a charitable organization meant to "[p]rovide scholarships, grants, and other educational assistance in memory of H. Lee Atwater." The Foundation awarded its first scholarship of $1,000 in 1992 to a sophomore at Wofford College. In 1996, it donated $50,000 to Newberry College for the construction of a soccer field named after Atwater. The Foundation was dissolved in 2011.

In November 1995, Atwater protege Mary Matalin and her husband James Carville held a fundraiser on behalf of The Newberry College Foundation to establish a Lee Atwater Forum on Public Policy, intended to "bring four or five prominent political leaders to Newberry each year to discuss public policy in Atwater's honor." The result of the fundraiser is unclear; the Forum itself appears to be defunct.

=== Film and TV about Atwater ===
Atwater's political career is the subject of the 2008 feature-length documentary film Boogie Man: The Lee Atwater Story.

College Republicans, a buddy comedy spec script written by Wes Jones about Lee Atwater and Karl Rove, topped The Black List (survey) in 2010. Since then, multiple iterations of the film have stalled in pre-production (see Development hell). In 2010, Shia LaBeouf was reportedly considering one of the lead roles, with Richard Linklater rumored to direct; in 2011, Paul Dano was reportedly attached to play Rove and Linklater to direct; in 2014, Daniel Radcliffe and Dane DeHaan were reportedly set to star as Atwater and Rove respectively with John Krokidas to direct; and in 2020, Asa Butterfield and Logan Lerman were set to play Atwater and Rove respectively with James Schamus to direct — this is the cast and director currently listed on the film's IMDb page, which is labeled "Pre-Production." In 2016, Black List Live! hosted a gender-swapped live staged reading of the script starring Alexis Bledel as Atwater and Mae Whitman as Rove, directed by Jones.

Atwater appears as a character, played by Dustin Seavey, in the second season of the 2019 alternate history television series For All Mankind.

=== Plays about Atwater ===
The one-man play Atwater: Fixin' to Die by Robert Myers premiered in 1992 with Dylan Baker at New York's West Bank Theatre, directed by Ethan McSweeny, and has been performed in various venues more than a dozen times since. Shortly after the play's debut, Myers entered talks with Home Box Office to develop a film adaptation with Dennis Quaid as Atwater; however, the film never materialized. The following year, The University of South Carolina rejected a producer's request to stage a production of the play at Longstreet Theatre, citing concern for Atwater's family; this decision proved controversial among students and faculty alike, some of whom viewed the decision as an act of censorship.

The play Son of a Bitch by Lucy Gillespie in 2019 at The Hollywood Fringe Festival with Ben Hethcoat as Atwater, directed by Billy Ray Brewton.

The play Atwater by Fred Thompson premiered in 2023 at PURE Theatre in Charleston, SC with Brannen Daugherty in the titular role.

== See also ==
- Starve the beast (Policy)
- Karl Rove

Party political offices
Preceded by Frank Fahrenkopf	Chair of the Republican National Committee; 1989–1991	Succeeded by Clay Yeutter
