= Revolving Door (advertisement) =

1988 U.S. presidential campaign ad

- A frame from Revolving Door
- Client: 1988 George H.W. Bush presidential campaign
- Language: English
- Release date: October 5, 1988
- Country: United States

"Revolving Door" was a famous negative television commercial made for Republican Party nominee George H. W. Bush's campaign during the 1988 United States presidential election. Along with the Willie Horton ("Weekend Passes") commercial, it is considered to have been a major factor in Bush's defeat of the Democratic Party nominee Michael Dukakis. The ad was produced by political consultant Roger Ailes with help from Bush campaign manager Lee Atwater, and first aired on October 5, 1988. "Revolving door syndrome" is a term used in criminology to refer to recidivism; however, the implication in the ad is that prison sentences were of an inconsequential length.

== Synopsis ==
The ad shows a line of convicts (portrayed by actors) casually walking in and out of a prison (filmed in Draper, Utah) by means of a revolving door. The narration states that as governor of Massachusetts, Dukakis vetoed mandatory minimum sentencing for drug dealers, that he vetoed the death penalty, and that he gave weekend furloughs to first-degree murderers. The narrator goes on to point out that while furloughed, many of the convicts committed crimes including kidnapping and rape, and are still at large. The ad concludes with the phrase: "Now Michael Dukakis says he wants to do for America what he's done for Massachusetts. America can't afford that risk." The disclaimer at the end indicates the ad was paid for and endorsed by the Bush and Dan Quayle campaign.

== Impact ==
A CBS News/New York Times poll showed that of all of the political ads of the 1988 presidential campaign, this one had the greatest impact on respondents. The percentage of poll respondents who felt Bush was "tough enough" on crime rose from 23 percent in July 1988 to 61 percent in late October 1988, while the proportion saying Dukakis was "not tough enough" on crime rose from 36 to 49 percent during the same period. The ad itself was first shot with real prisoners. As they included "too many blacks", the ad was reshot with actors, including only "one or two" black men. Many, such as Jesse Jackson, called the "Revolving Door" ad racist.

== Furlough program ==
The original state inmate furlough program, for which convicted first-degree murderers were ineligible, was actually signed into law by Republican Governor Francis W. Sargent in 1972. After the Massachusetts Supreme Court ruled that this right extended to first-degree murderers, the Massachusetts legislature quickly passed a bill prohibiting furloughs for such inmates; however, Dukakis vetoed this bill in 1976. The program remained in effect through the intervening term of governor Edward J. King and was abolished during Dukakis' final term of office on April 28, 1988. This abolition only occurred after the Lawrence Eagle Tribune had run 175 stories about the furlough program and won a Pulitzer Prize. Dukakis continued to argue that the program was 99 percent effective; yet, as the Lawrence Eagle Tribune pointed out, no state outside of Massachusetts, nor any federal program, would grant a furlough to a prisoner serving life without parole.

== Related ads ==
=== 2014 gubernatorial election in Illinois ===
In the 2014 Illinois gubernatorial election, Republican gubernatorial candidate and eventual governor Bruce Rauner created an attack ad entitled "Unthinkable", alleging that then-governor Pat Quinn "secretly" released 230+ violent offenders early, such as wife-beaters, rapists, sex offenders, and murderers. The ad went on to say that the consequences were "unthinkable": sexual assault of a minor, aggravated assaults, domestic abuse, and more murders. The video ends with the voiceover saying "Now Pat Quinn Wants Four More Years?"

== Popular culture ==
In the Simpsons episode "Sideshow Bob Roberts", Sideshow Bob runs for Mayor of Springfield against incumbent "Diamond Joe" Quimby. His campaign runs an attack ad against Quimby very similar to the Bush/Quayle ad; in addition to revolving doors, prisoners are also seen leaving the prison via escalators and ski-lifts, before running away laughing. The narrator intones: "Mayor Quimby supports revolving door prisons. Mayor Quimby even released Sideshow Bob – a man twice convicted of attempted murder. Can you trust a man like Mayor Quimby? Vote Sideshow Bob for mayor!"

== See also ==
- Attack ad
