= Redhot & Blue (musical group) =

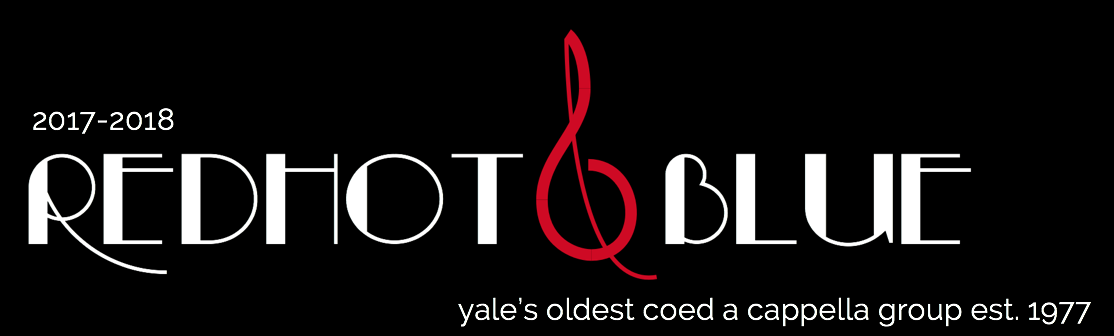

Background information
- Origin: Yale University
- Genre: A cappella
- Years active: 1977–present
- Website: http://www.redhotandblueofyale.org/

Redhot & Blue, usually called Redhot or RHB, is Yale University's oldest all-gender a cappella group. Founded in 1977, the group has released 17 albums. It regularly tours the United States, and it tours internationally once a year, to locations such as China, Japan, France, Italy, and Brazil. The group’s repertoire is based in the jazz genre, but has expanded to include an array of musical styles. Redhot is a member of the Singing Group Council of Yale.

== Membership ==
Most members join the group through the a cappella rush process at Yale University. The process starts when freshmen arrive onto the Yale campus in the Fall, and ends a few weeks later with one of the university's most well-known traditions: Tap Night. This is not to be confused with Yale's secret society tap night, which is generally held during the end of the Spring semester. The rush process is governed by the Singing Group Council of Yale.

=== Rush ===
Rush begins officially when freshmen arrive on campus, but the first major event in the process is the Woolsey Hall Jamboree. Each of the fifteen groups sings two songs at this concert; the Dwight Hall Jamboree, a similarly structured concert, occurs the Friday after the one at Woolsey Hall. At this second jam, potential members of Redhot & Blue sign up to audition. The group listens to auditions during the following Saturday and Sunday, and then there are three weeks of interaction between the group and hopefuls, resulting in callbacks for those the group wants to hear a second time. Redhot & Blue Tap night is the week after callbacks, on a date not released by the Singing Group Council until the day it begins at midnight.

== Tours ==
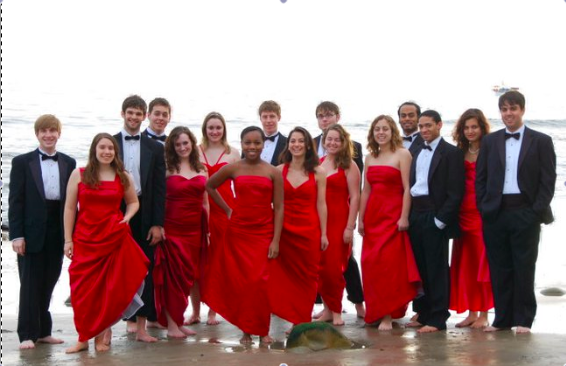
Redhot & Blue on the beaches of Santa Barbara, California

Each year, the group takes three tours, of which at least one is international. Recent international tour destinations include Rio de Janeiro, São Paulo, and Belo Horizonte (Brazil); Shanghai, Beijing, and Hangzhou (China); Tokyo (Japan); and various locations in Europe and the United Kingdom. Recent Domestic tour locations include Puerto Rico, Los Angeles, San Francisco, Washington D.C., New York City, St. Louis, and Chicago. The group's tours are funded through concerts it provides throughout the year. Notable concert venues include the Beijing Central Conservatory; Grace Cathedral in San Francisco; and the Kennedy Center for the Performing Arts in Washington, D.C.

On the recent tour to Paris, France, Redhot performed for the U.S. Ambassador to UNESCO. The event was described on the diplomatic mission's website as "a swinging soiree, with music by Yale's award winning a cappella group, Redhot & Blue." The group performed old favorites, such as George Gershwin's “Summertime,” and new arrangements like “Georgia on my Mind.”

== Repertoire ==
Each year, the musical director of the group chooses the active repertoire from the hundreds of songs in the group's archive. The repertoire spans a variety of genres, from jazz standards to Motown, folk music, and classic rock. The group has historically added an average of between four and five arrangements per year during its more-than-thirty years of existence; thus, each musical director has more songs from which to choose than his or her predecessor. The group allows any group member to submit arrangements, though most who do so are well-versed in composition of vocal music. At any time, there are between twenty and thirty songs in the active repertoire.

== Albums and awards ==
The group has released twelve official albums and various live recordings, both video and audio. Studio recordings by the group have been critically acclaimed, winning various awards and being included in compilations including the Best of Collegiate A Cappella (BOCA) series. Redhot's 1992 album, "Shut Up and Sing" swept all the categories of the Contemporary A Cappella Recording Awards (CARAs) for which it was eligible: Best Mixed Collegiate Arrangement, Best Mixed Collegiate Soloist, Best Mixed Collegiate Song, and Best Mixed Collegiate Album. CARA also awarded alumna Lisa Bielawa runner up for the 1995 best female vocalist. The song When You Are Old, composed for the group by John Kelley '86 based on a poem by William Butler Yeats, won the 1997 Young Composers Competition from G. Schirmer. The group was also featured on "A Cappella Party: Best of the Ivy League Singing Groups," with 2 tracks out of 17 devoted to Redhot on this 1996 release. Redhot's most recent work can be found on its Spotify.

== History ==
Redhot was founded in 1977 by Shelley Lotter and Leslie Lipton, both in the graduating class of 1979. At the time, there were six all-male a cappella groups and three all-female. The repertoire was largely based on arrangements done by Jon Prestley and by David H. Bass. Opening Night, the group's first album, was released in 1979.

== Name ==
The group's name is derived from the musical Red, Hot and Blue (1936), written by Yale alumnus Cole Porter, class of 1913. The group name combines Redhot into one word and uses an ampersand, unlike the show. Porter's work is featured often in Redhot's repertoire, from Antoinette Birby, written while he was in college, to more popular songs like "It's De-Lovely", "I Get a Kick Out of You", "Night And Day", and "Ev'ry Time We Say Goodbye". The group's name is often shortened to Redhot, although it has also been called RHB and RH&B.
