= Red Hot & Blue (Lee Atwater recording project) =

Studio album by Lee Atwater
- Released: 1990
- Recorded: 1989
- Studio: Treasure Isle
- Genre: R&B, blues
- Label: Curb

Red Hot & Blue is an album released in 1990 by Lee Atwater, a Republican political consultant in the United States. Atwater wanted to bring to a wider audience the sounds of 1960s Stax Records and southern R&B and blues. "Bad Boy" was released as a single. The title track was nominated for a Grammy Award.

Atwater donated his portion of the album royalties to charity. He was hospitalized for treatment for his brain tumor at the time of Red Hot & Blue's release.

== Production ==
The album was recorded in 1989 at Treasure Isle Recorders in Nashville, with Atwater flying in for weekend sessions. Isaac Hayes produced six of its songs; he praised Atwater's guitar playing. The album features over a dozen rhythm and blues performers, including Hayes, Chuck Jackson, Carla Thomas, B.B. King, Sam Moore, the Memphis Horns, and Billy Preston. Atwater chose the performers and the songs; he asked Mike Curb to release the album on his label. Lee Greenwood played saxophone on Red Hot & Blue.

Atwater forced a Washington, D.C., YMCA to play work-in-progress cuts over its sound system while he exercised. Atwater reported that the highlight of the album was the chance to play with his idol, B.B. King. "Just a Little Bit/Treat Her Right" is a duet between Atwater and Arletta Nightingale.

== Critical reception ==
Professional ratings
Review scores
Source	Rating
AllMusic	3/5 stars
Robert Christgau	(dud)
Los Angeles Times	2/5 stars

Due to his politics, Atwater expected the album to receive negative reviews. The Los Angeles Times concluded that Atwater's "not any better than a singer in an average bar band, but he is more convincing than such other celebrity pop figures as, say, the Blues Brothers and Bruce Willis." USA Today opined that, "even able assists from B.B. King and Isaac Hayes can't mask the utter amateurism of Atwater's soulless chirping and clumsy guitar picking." The Buffalo News wrote that, "as novelties like these go, it's a decent party album."

The Austin American-Statesman determined that "it's a harmless, if less than exciting, album that uses a star-studded cast of Memphis greats to recreate a sort of soulful frat party rock based in the Stax sound." Spin deemed the album "quality nostalgia, appealing to the sort of sensibility that only appreciates black culture at a suitable historical distance... Call it the Paul Shaffer syndrome." The Baltimore Sun considered Atwater's guitar solos to be "stiff and unswinging."

AllMusic wrote that "guitarist/vocalist and arch Republican Lee Atwater, along with a star-studded list of soul artists, ignite on 13 blue chip live performances of great R&B songs." Mother Jones stated: "In his horn-laced, slick-voiced rendition of 'Bad Boy', the late Republican icon got to live out his down-home musical fantasies in stereo LP format."

== Track listing ==
1. "Te-Ni-Nee-Ni-Nu" (Slim Harpo)
2. "Knock on Wood" (Eddie Floyd)
3. "I Take What I Want" (Sam & Dave)
4. "Hold On, I'm Coming" (Sam & Dave)
5. "Rescue Me" (Raynard Miner and Carl William Smith)
6. "Just a Little Bit/Treat Her Right" (Rosco Gordon/Roy Head)
7. "Bad Boy" (Eddie Taylor)
8. "Red Hot & Blue" (B.B. King and Lee Atwater)
9. "Ya Ya" (Lee Dorsey)
10. "Buzz Me" (Louis Jordan)
11. "I'm in the Mood" (Billy Preston and Issac Hayes)
12. "Life Is Like a Game"
13. "People Get Ready" (Curtis Mayfield)
