= Red Hot & Blue (restaurant) =

American restaurant chain

Red Hot and Blue
- Type: Restaurant
- Industry: Casual Dining
- Genre: Smoked BBQ
- Founded: 1989; 37 years ago Memphis, Tennessee, U.S.
- Founders: Lee Atwater; Don Sundquist; Bob Friedman; Joel Wood; Wendell Moore
- Successor: AJB Capital
- Headquarters: Wake Forest, North Carolina, U.S.
- Number of locations: 3
- Area served: VIRGINIA: Fairfax; MARYLAND: Annapolis, Laurel
- Key people: CEO: Adam Bradley
- Products: Hickory-smoked pulled pork, St. Louis-Style "dry" rubbed ribs, Texas beef brisket, smoked chicken wings, famous potato salad
- Services: Full service and fast casual dining, Catering, Take-Out, & Delivery
- Owner: AJB Capital affiliate fund
- Divisions: Dine-In, Catering, Take-Out, Delivery
- Subsidiaries: Franchise opportunities are available
- Website: redhotandblue.com

Red Hot & Blue is a Memphis style barbecue restaurant franchise founded by political strategist Lee Atwater and former House of Representatives member and Governor of Tennessee Don Sundquist of Memphis, Tennessee, among others.

== History ==
Red Hot and Blue was founded in 1989 by Atwater, Sundquist, Bob Friedman, Joel Wood, and Wendell Moore, with its first location in Arlington, Virginia, near Washington, D.C. Friedman described the concept of the restaurant as "pigs, pork, and blues" as reflected in the company's logo. The name is taken from the title of DJ Dewey Phillips' radio show which aired on WHBQ-AM in Memphis in the 1950s.

Red Hot and Blue is served at George Mason University basketball games at the Patriot Center.

In 2018, AJB Capital acquired Red Hot & Blue through an affiliate fund, announcing plans for substantial reinvestment in the system.

On January 17, 2021, the original executive chef and pitmaster, Ernest "Sonny" McKnight, died due to lung cancer. McKnight was Red Hot & Blue's first employee.

== See also ==
- Memphis-style barbecue
- List of barbecue restaurants
