= Willie Horton =

American convicted felon (born 1951)

William Robert Horton
- Born: William Robert Horton; August 12, 1951 (age 75); Chesterfield, South Carolina, U.S.
- Status: Incarcerated
- Convictions: First degree murder, armed robbery, rape, assault
- Penalty: Life imprisonment without the possibility of parole

Details
- Imprisoned at: Jessup Correctional Institution; Jessup, Maryland, U.S.

William Robert Horton (born August 12, 1951) is an American felon. In popular media he is commonly referred to as "Willie Horton", though he does not use this nickname himself.

Having been convicted of a 1974 robbery and murder, Horton absconded from a Massachusetts prison furlough program in 1986. In 1987, while on the run, Horton committed kidnapping, armed robbery, and rape in Maryland.

During the 1988 U.S. presidential election, Vice President and Republican nominee George H. W. Bush brought Horton up frequently during his campaign against Democratic nominee Michael Dukakis who was the governor of Massachusetts, and whom Bush claimed was responsible for Horton's release on furlough.

== Early life ==
William Robert Horton was born in August 1951 in South Carolina. He was convicted of assault as a teenager and was sentenced to prison time. Horton subsequently moved to Lawrence, Massachusetts, and became a drug dealer.

== 1974: Robbery and murder ==
At around 10 p.m. on October 26, 1974, the body of Joseph "Joey" Fournier was found at a gas station in Lawrence, Massachusetts. Fournier was a 17-year-old white teenager, a senior at Greater Lawrence Vocational School, and an employee of the gas station. Fournier had last been seen alive by a witness sometime between 9:25 p.m. and 9:40 p.m. on that evening. Fournier had suffered multiple stab wounds.

Three African-American men were subsequently arrested in connection with the robbery and murder of Fournier: Horton, Alvin L. Wideman, and Roosevelt Pickett. Each man admitted to participating in the robbery in some way, but their statements were inconsistent on details of the events. They all agree they were together on October 26, 1974, in Pickett's 1963 Chevrolet returning from a party in Lowell, Massachusetts, when they decided to rob the gas station.

Horton stated that he had been driving the Chevrolet, remained in the car, and did not enter the gas station. Horton claimed Wideman and Pickett had entered the gas station armed with knives and returned shortly after with around $210 in cash. Horton further claimed that Pickett had referred to destruction of evidence in relation to a "dead honky".

Pickett contradicted Horton: he claimed that the robbery was Horton's idea, and that Pickett had remained in the car while Wideman and Horton had gone into the gas station with knives. Pickett further claimed that Wideman and Horton returned to the car with cash, of which each man received $70-$80.

Wideman's statements were largely consistent with Pickett's, i.e., that Wideman and Horton had entered the gas station while Pickett remained in the car. Wideman claimed that although he had robbed Fournier, Fournier was alive when Wideman left the gas station and suggested that Horton had stabbed Fournier.

A witness testified that Alvin L. Wideman had confessed to killing a man on the night of the crime. Wideman was said to have admitted to demanding money from the man, who relinquished the money and pleaded for his life. The witness stated that Wideman said he had become angry at that point and stabbed the man multiple times.

Other witnesses testified that they had seen a 1963 Chevrolet containing three black men in and near the gas station shortly before Fournier's body was discovered.

Witnesses called by the defense testified that Pickett had been with them at another location at the time of the robbery and murder, and that Pickett's hairstyle was different from that described by witnesses who saw men in the 1963 Chevrolet before the crime was committed.

Ultimately Horton, Wideman, and Pickett were all convicted of armed robbery and murder in the first degree. The men were sentenced to life imprisonment without the possibility of parole.

== 1986-1987: absconsion from prison furlough, kidnap and rape ==
On June 6, 1986, Horton was released from prison as part of a weekend furlough program but did not return. He had previously been released on nine occasions without breach of furlough conditions. Horton absconded to Florida (where he worked in construction) and then to Baltimore, Maryland.

On April 3, 1987, in Oxon Hill, Maryland, Horton twice raped a woman after pistol-whipping, stabbing, binding, and gagging her fiancé. He then stole the assault victim's car.

Horton was arrested in relation to the events in Oxon Hill. He was convicted of kidnapping, rape, and attempted murder in the Prince George's County Circuit Court of Maryland, and in December 1987 was sentenced to two life terms plus 85 years. The sentencing judge, Vincent J. Femia, refused to return Horton to Massachusetts, saying, "I'm not prepared to take the chance that Mr. Horton might again be furloughed or otherwise released...This man should never draw a breath of free air again."

As of December 30, 2025, Horton was incarcerated at the Jessup Correctional Facility in Maryland.

== Legislative and political background ==
Massachusetts Prison Population 1978-2015

In 1972, Republican Governor Frank Sargent began the Massachusetts furlough program that provided 18–48 hours of home leave for certain prisoners. The program was designed to promote good behavior among incarcerated populations and aid assimilation into the community after serving their sentences.

The program initially excluded prisoners convicted of murder in the first degree. In 1973, the Massachusetts Supreme Judicial Court ruled that the ability to furlough would be extended to individual "first degree lifer" incarcerated "only on recommendation of the appropriate superintendent and on approval of the commissioner, whose approval we take to be nondelegable." In 1976, Michael Dukakis refused to sign a bill that would have prevented those serving a life sentence from becoming eligible for furlough. He stated it would "cut the heart out of efforts at inmate rehabilitation." 23 other states permitted those convicted of first-degree murder to be eligible for furlough. In 1987, the furlough program in Massachusetts recorded 77% of the 1,161 incarcerated who received a furlough were from pre-release or minimum security facilities and that 56% of those furloughed had no prior adult convictions. The Massachusetts Department of Correction recorded 5 escapes in 1987, equating to less than one escape for every 100 furloughs, a rate of 0.43%.

The furlough program remained through the intervening term of Governor Edward J. King, and was abolished for those sentenced to life during Dukakis's final term of office after freezing the program following the incident in Maryland concerning William R. Horton. This abolition occurred after immense public pressure and the Lawrence Eagle-Tribune which had run 175 stories about the furlough program, winning a Pulitzer Prize but later, it was revealed by the Washington Journalism Review that these articles were filled with "outrageous errors" presented with a bias against the furlough program without providing readers facts or statistics on the program. The program was one of many, but one of the few run by a Democratic Presidential candidate. Ronald Reagan himself had run a furlough program in California.

== Horton in the 1988 presidential campaign ==
Horton's mug shot from "Weekend Passes" ad

In April 1988, Democratic Senator Al Gore of Tennessee was the first to mention the Massachusetts furlough program at a Democratic Primary. He cited the robbery-assault in Maryland without mentioning William Horton by name before posing this question to Michael Dukakis, "If you were elected President, would you advocate a similar program for federal penitentiaries?"

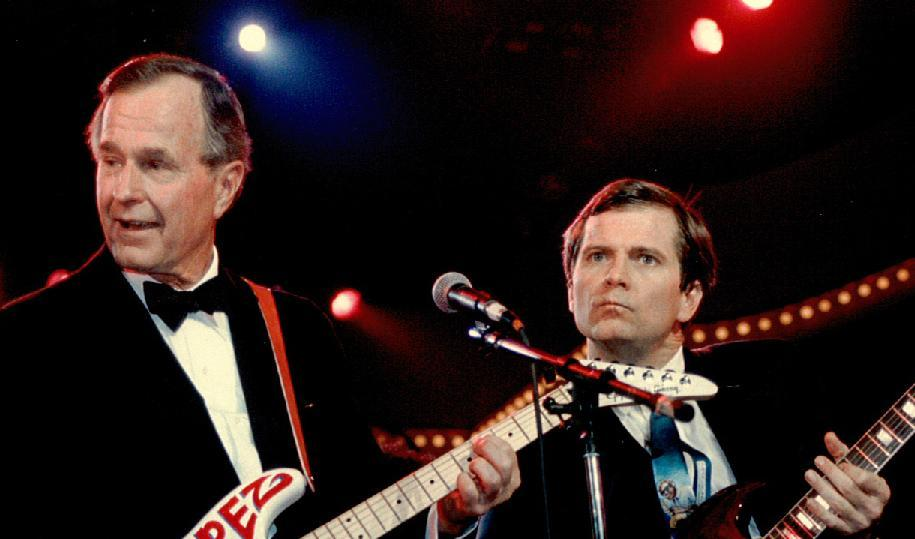
George H.W. Bush and Lee Atwater with guitars

The campaign manager for George Bush, Lee Atwater had already been researching on William Horton with his team prior to Gore asking Dukakis about it at the debate: Republicans then eagerly picked up the issue after Dukakis won the Democratic nomination. Atwater said, "By the time we're finished, they're going to wonder whether Willie Horton is Dukakis's running mate." William Horton, in an article from Playboy magazine in 1989, stated a woman claiming to be affiliated with an organization working with the Bush campaign called and wrote to him asking him to endorse Dukakis. In June 1988, Republican candidate George H.W. Bush seized on the Horton case, bringing it up repeatedly in campaign speeches. The Dukakis campaign countered that the Massachusetts crime rate fell by 13.4% during his second term, and that the homicide rate had become the lowest of any major state in the nation.

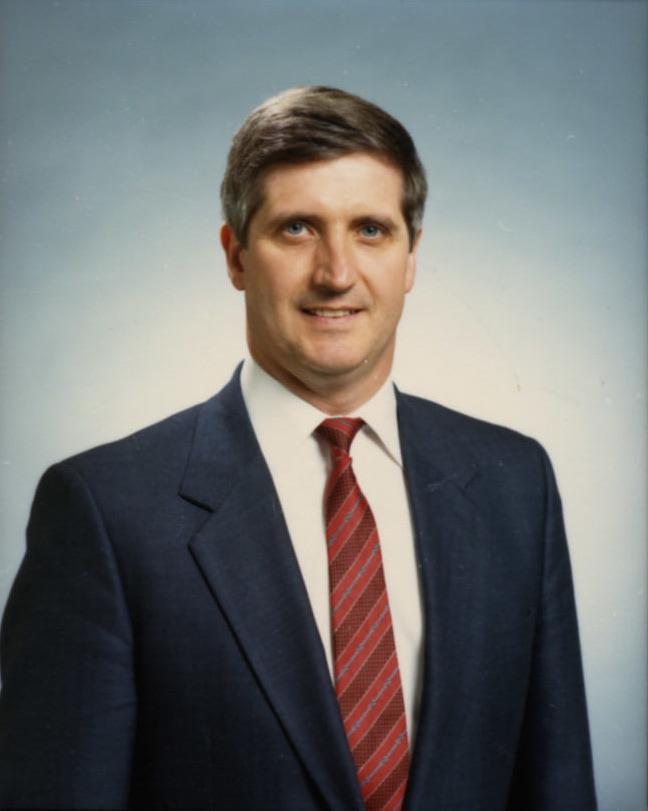
Andrew Card, Bush aide

Campaign staffer James Pinkerton returned with reams of material that Atwater told him to reduce to a 3-by-5-inch (8 cm × 13 cm) index card, telling him, "I'm giving you one thing: You can use both sides of the 3×5 card." Pinkerton discovered the furlough issue by watching the Felt Forum debate. On May 25, 1988, Republican consultants met in Paramus, New Jersey, holding a focus group of "Reagan Democrats" who had voted for Ronald Reagan in 1984. These focus groups convinced Atwater and the other Republican consultants that they should 'go negative' against Dukakis. Further information regarding the furlough came from aide Andrew Card, a Massachusetts native whom President George W. Bush later named as his Chief of Staff.

Over the Fourth of July weekend in 1988, Atwater attended a motorcyclists' convention in Luray, Virginia, where the Horton story featured in the July issue of Reader's Digest was mentioned by diners in Brown's Chinese-American Restaurant. Atwater joined the conversation without mentioning who he was. Later that night, a focus group in Alabama turned completely against Dukakis when presented with the information about Horton's furlough. Atwater used this occurrence to argue the necessity of pounding Dukakis about the furlough issue, stating "...we could really blow up Dukakis, and we had to do it."

=== Fall campaign ===
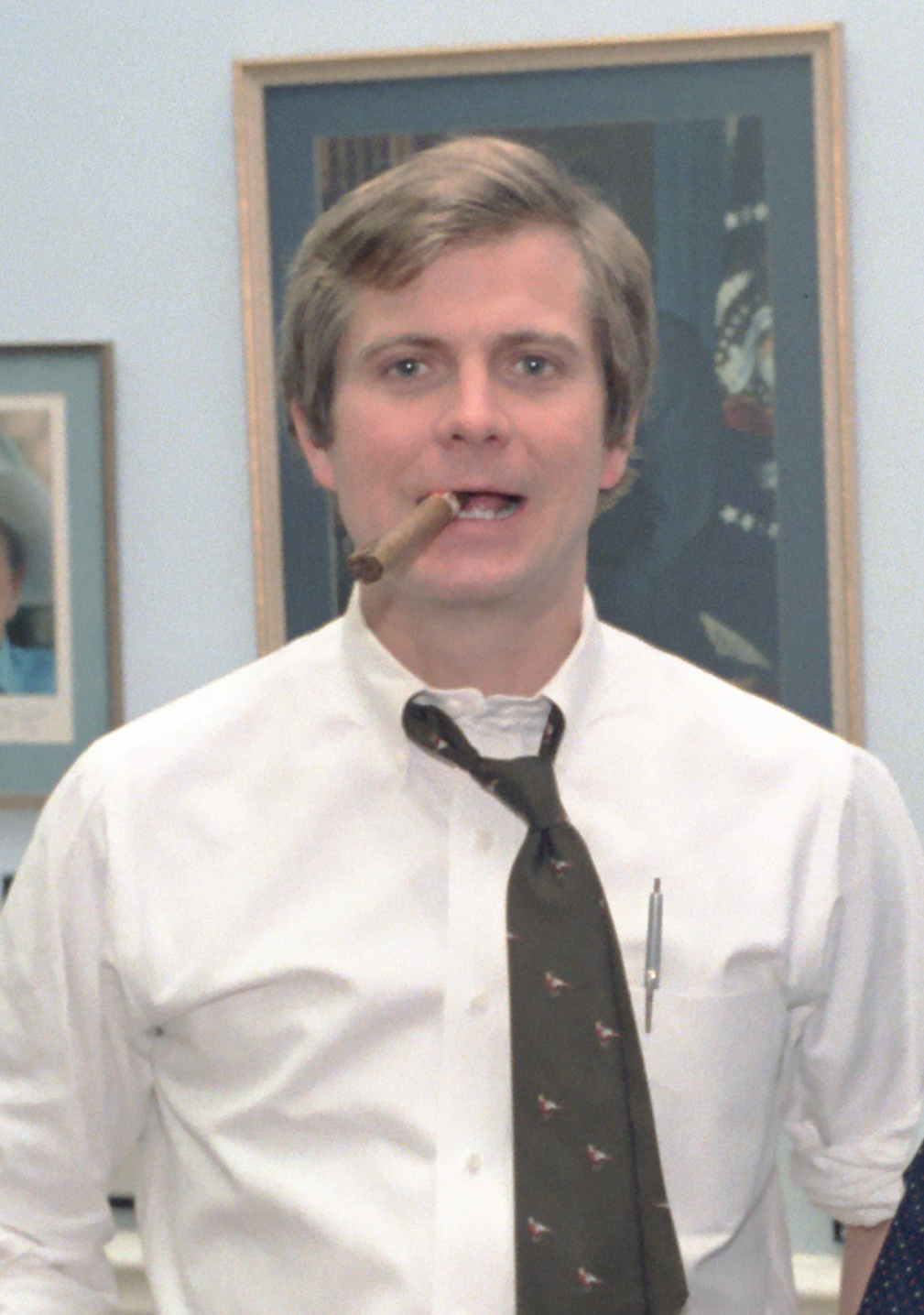
Lee Atwater in the White House, 1982

Beginning on September 21, 1988, the Americans for Bush arm of the National Security Political Action Committee (NSPAC), under the auspices of Floyd Brown, began running a campaign ad entitled "Weekend Passes," using the Horton case to attack Dukakis. The ad was produced by media consultant Larry McCarthy, who had previously worked for Roger Ailes. After clearing the ad with television stations, McCarthy added a mug shot of Horton. The ad was run as an independent expenditure, separate from the Bush campaign, which claimed not to have had any role in its production. The ad referred to Horton as "Willie", although he later said he had always gone by William:

The fact is, my name is not 'Willie.' It's part of the myth of the case. The name irks me. It was created to play on racial stereotypes: big, ugly, dumb, violent, black — 'Willie.' I resent that. They created a fictional character — who seemed believable but did not exist. They stripped me of my identity, distorted the facts, and robbed me of my constitutional rights.

1988 Presidential Election Results Maryland

On October 5, 1988, a day after the "Weekend Passes" ad was taken off the airwaves and the day of the Bentsen–Quayle debate, the Bush campaign ran its ad, "Revolving Door," which also attacked Dukakis over the weekend furlough program. While the advertisement did not mention Horton or feature his photograph, it depicted a variety of men walking in and out of prison through a revolving door.

The controversy escalated when vice presidential candidate Lloyd Bentsen and former Democratic presidential candidate and civil rights leader Jesse Jackson called the "Revolving Door" ad racist, a charge which was denied by Bush and campaign staff. Despite the denial that race was a factor in the ad, studies show that racial prejudice was increased after witnessing the ad and the ad influenced viewers to support harsher criminal laws.

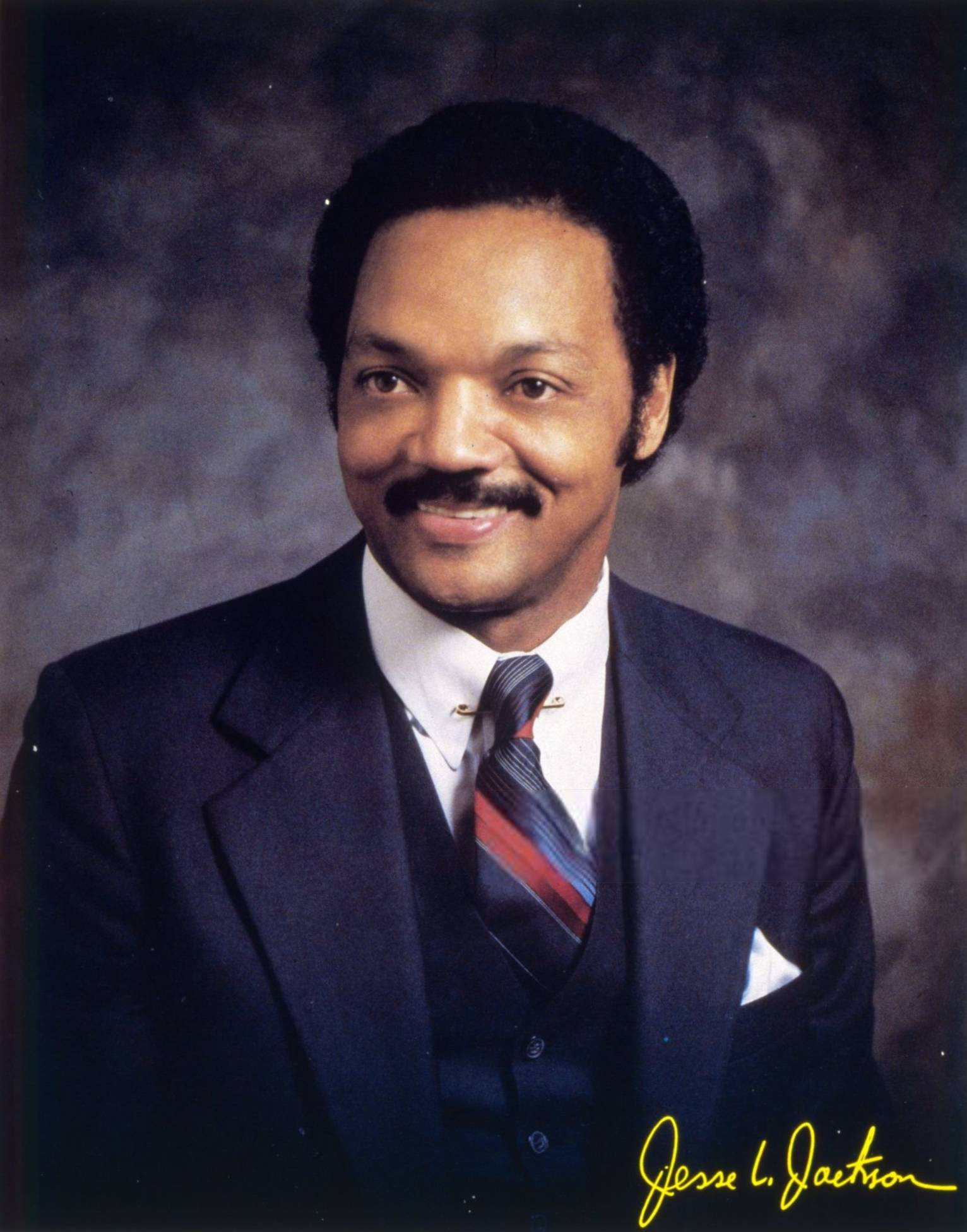
Jesse Jackson

Throughout most of the campaign, the Horton ad was seen as focusing on criminal justice issues, with neither the candidates nor journalists mentioning a racial component. Near the end of the presidential campaign—on October 21, 1988—Democratic primary runner-up Jesse Jackson accused the ad's creators of playing upon presumed fears of some voters, in particular those harboring stereotyped fears of blacks as criminals. From that point on, race was a substantial part of the media coverage of the ad itself and the campaign. Some candidates continued to deny it, and most commentators at the time felt it was not. Academics have noted that the alleged racial overtone of the ad was a key aspect of the way the ad was remembered and later studied.

Journalist Robert MacNeil, the co-founder of NewsHour, said voter response to the Horton ad was, "I'm going to vote for George Bush because I can't vote for a man who lets murderers out of jail."

On October 22, in an attempt to counter-attack, Dukakis's campaign ran an ad about a convicted heroin dealer named Angel Medrano who raped and killed a pregnant mother of two after escaping from a federal correctional halfway house.

1988 Presidential Election Results Nationwide

In 1990, the Ohio Democratic Party and a group called "Black Elected Democrats of Ohio" filed a complaint with the Federal Election Commission alleging that NSPAC had coordinated or cooperated with the Bush campaign in airing the ad, which would make it an illegal in-kind campaign contribution. The investigation by the FEC, including deposition of officials from both organizations, revealed indirect connections between McCarthy and the Bush campaign (such as his having previously worked for Ailes) but found no direct evidence of wrongdoing. The investigation reached an impasse and was eventually closed with no finding of any violation of campaign finance laws.

== Legacy ==
Robin Toner of The New York Times wrote in 1990 that Republicans and Democrats, while disagreeing on the merits of the ad itself, agreed it was "devastating to Dukakis." Dukakis said in 2012 that while he initially tried to ignore the ad during the 1988 campaign, two months later he "realized that I was getting killed with this stuff."

In September 2014, Horton apologized to Dukakis for "the role I played in him losing the election."

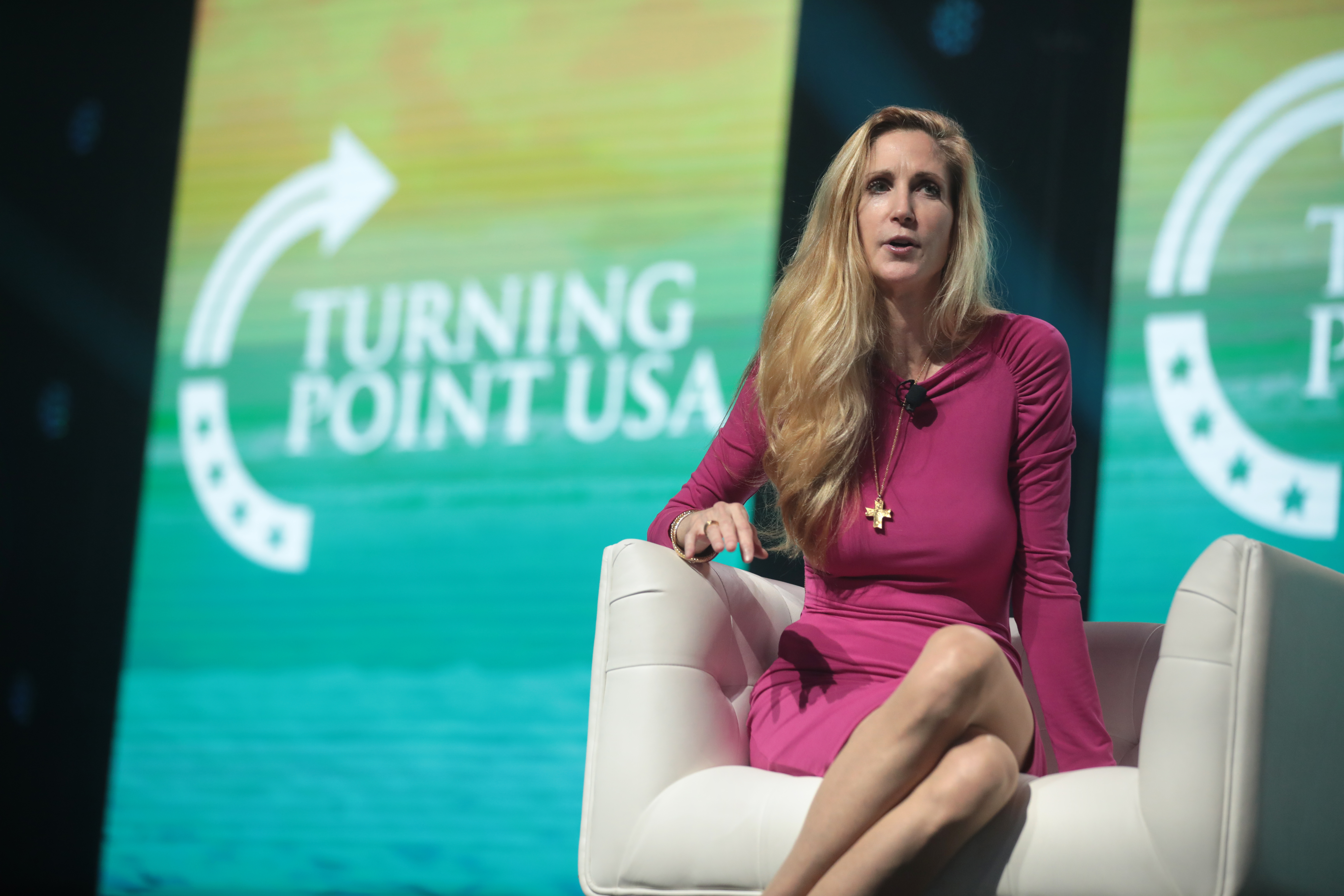
Ann Coulter at Turning Point USA Student Action Summit 2019

In December 2018, after Bush's death, the ad was again highlighted by political commentators. Ann Coulter described his Willie Horton ad as "the greatest campaign commercial in political history," claiming that it "clearly and forcefully highlighted the two presidential candidates' diametrically opposed views" on crime.

Many other commentators have remarked that the Bush presidency, back to the campaign's Horton advertisement, stoked racial animosity, and suggested the ad itself was race-baiting, as Horton's race is still a key part of public awareness of the ad.

During the 2026 midterm elections, president Donald Trump evoked Willie Horton when criticizing Roy Cooper, the Democratic candidate for North Carolina's US Senate race, as being soft on crime. Trump told the story twice within thirty minutes' time, "speaking at the same rally to the same audience from the same lectern . . . using some of the same language (and getting the facts wrong both times)."

== See also ==
- List of photographs considered the most important
- 2009 Lakewood shooting – Mass shooting in Washington, U.S.
- "Daisy" – 1964 US presidential campaign advertisement
- Wayne DuMond – American murderer and rapist (1949–2005)
- "Revolving Door" – 1988 U.S. presidential campaign ad
- Swiftboating – Character assassination as a political tactic
- Kamala is for they/them – American political advertisement
