= 2002 Massachusetts elections =

2002 Massachusetts general election
- November 5, 2002

Part of the 2002 United States elections

A Massachusetts general election was held on November 5, 2002 in the Commonwealth of Massachusetts.

The election included:

- statewide elections for U.S. Senator, Governor, Lieutenant Governor, Attorney General, Secretary of the Commonwealth, Treasurer, and Auditor;
- district elections for U.S. Representatives, State Representatives, State Senators, and Governor's Councillors; and
- ballot questions at the state and local levels.

Democratic and Republican candidates were selected in party primaries held September 17, 2002.

== Governor and lieutenant governor ==
Republicans Mitt Romney and Kerry Healey were elected governor and lieutenant governor, respectively, over Democratic candidates Shannon O'Brien and Chris Gabrieli, Green-Rainbow candidates Jill Stein and Tony Lorenzen, Libertarian candidates Carla Howell and Rich Aucoin, and independent candidates Barbara C. Johnson and Joe Schebel.

== Secretary of the Commonwealth ==
Democrat William F. Galvin was re-elected Secretary of the Commonwealth for a third term. He defeated perennial candidate Jack E. Robinson III in the general election.

2002 Massachusetts Secretary of the Commonwealth election
Party	Candidate	Votes	%	±%
Democratic	William F. Galvin (incumbent)	1,472,562	73.97%	▲3.95
Republican	Jack E. Robinson III	516,260	25.93%	▲0.76
Write-in	All others	1,832	0.09%	
Turnout		1,990,654		
Democratic hold		Swing		

== Attorney general ==
2002 Massachusetts Attorney General election
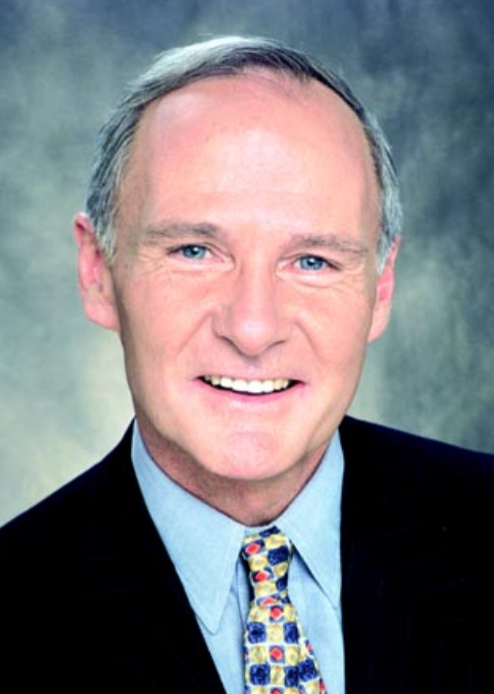

Nominee	Thomas Reilly
Party	Democratic	Write-ins
Popular vote	1,602,817	12,326
Percentage	99.24%	0.76%
- County results Reilly: >90%
Attorney General before election
Thomas Reilly
Democratic
Elected Attorney General
Thomas Reilly
Democratic

Democrat Thomas Reilly ran unopposed.

2002 Massachusetts Attorney General election
Party	Candidate	Votes	%	±%
Democratic	Thomas Reilly (incumbent)	1,602,817	99.24%	▲32.47
Write-in	All others	12,326	0.76%	▲0.65
Total votes		1,615,143	100.00%	
Democratic hold		Swing		

== Treasurer and Receiver-General ==
2002 Massachusetts Treasurer election
- November 5, 2002
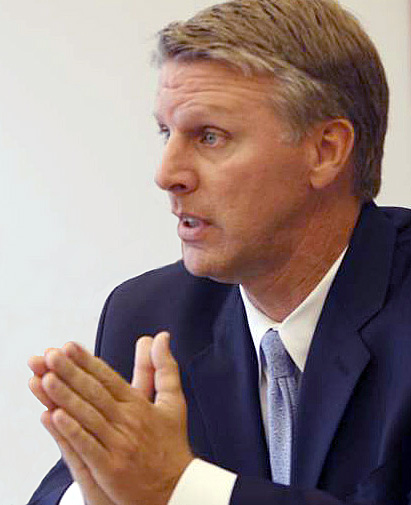

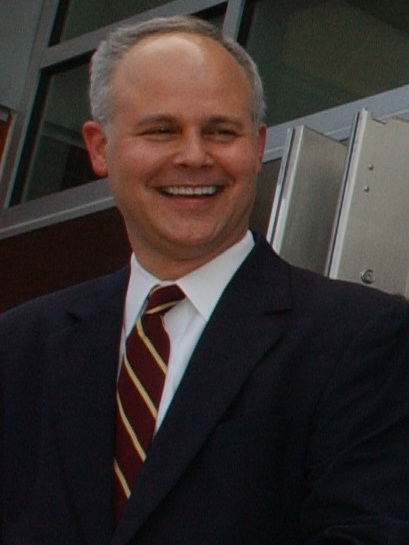

Nominee	Timothy P. Cahill	Daniel Grabauskas	James O'Keefe
Party	Democratic	Republican	Green-Rainbow
Popular vote	1,040,281	848,904	163,559
Percentage	50.7%	41.3%	8.0%
Treasurer and Receiver-General before election
Shannon O'Brien
Democratic
Elected Treasurer and Receiver-General
Timothy P. Cahill
Democratic

=== Democratic primary ===
==== Candidates ====
- Michael P. Cahill, State Representative from Beverly
- Timothy P. Cahill, Norfolk County Treasurer
- Stephen J. Murphy, member of the Boston City Council
- Jim Segel, former State Representative from Brookline and Executive Director of the Massachusetts Municipal Association

==== Results ====
2002 Democratic primary for Treasurer
Party	Candidate	Votes	%
Democratic	Timothy P. Cahill	226,505	35.79
Democratic	Jim Segel	153,940	24.33
Democratic	Stephen J. Murphy	135,612	21.43
Democratic	Michael P. Cahill	116,737	18.45

=== Republican primary ===
==== Candidates ====
- Dan Grabauskas, Massachusetts Registrar of Motor Vehicles
- Bruce A. Herzfelder, businessman

==== Results ====
2002 Republican primary for Treasurer
Party	Candidate	Votes	%
Republican	Dan Grabauskas	110,690	53.19%
Republican	Bruce A. Herzfelder	96,851	46.54%
Write-in	All others	560	0.27%

=== General election ===
==== Results ====
2002 Massachusetts Treasurer and Receiver-General election
Party	Candidate	Votes	%	±%
Democratic	Timothy P. Cahill	1,040,281	50.66%	
Republican	Daniel Grabauskas	848,904	41.34%	
Green-Rainbow	James O'Keefe	163,559	7.96%	
Write-in	All others	830	0.04%	
Total votes		2,053,574	100.00%	
Democratic hold		Swing		

== Auditor ==
Democrat A. Joseph DeNucci was re-elected Auditor. He defeated Libertarian Kamal Jain and Independent John James Xenakis.

2002 Massachusetts Auditor election
Party	Candidate	Votes	%	±%
Democratic	A. Joseph DeNucci (incumbent)	1,456,880	77.96%	
Independent	John James Xenakis	277,974	14.87%	N/A
Libertarian	Kamal Jain	133,997	7.17%	
Write-in	All others	2,065	0.11%	
Turnout		1,868,851		
Democratic hold		Swing		

== United States Senator ==
Democratic incumbent John Kerry was re-elected over his Libertarian challenger Michael Cloud.

== Massachusetts Senate ==
see 2002 Massachusetts Senate election

== Massachusetts House of Representatives ==
see 2002 Massachusetts House of Representatives election

== Governor's Council ==
See 2002 Massachusetts Governor's Council election

== Ballot measures ==
There were three statewide ballot questions, all initiatives, which Massachusetts voters considered in this election. There were also various local ballot questions around the commonwealth.

Number	Title	Type	Subject	Result (excludes blank ballots)	Ref.
Question 1	Eliminating State Personal Income Tax	Initiative Petition	Taxes	✗ Failed (48%–40%)	
Question 2	English Language Education in Public Schools	Initiative Petition	Education	✓ Passed (61%–29%)	
Question 3	Taxpayer Funding for Political Campaigns	Advisory Question	Taxes, Elections	✗ Failed (66%–23%)	

=== Question 1 ===
Massachusetts Question 1 (2002)
- Abolishing State Income Tax

Results
Choice	Votes	%
Yes	885,683	45.30%
No	1,069,467	54.70%
Valid votes	1,955,150	100.00%
Invalid or blank votes	0	0.00%
Total votes	1,955,150	100.00%

Yes
60–70%
50–60%
No
80–90%
70–80%
60–70%
50–60%

Abolishing the state income tax. A law to eliminate any state personal income tax for income or other gain realized on or after July 1, 2003.

Question 1: Abolishing the state income tax
Candidate		Votes	%	±
	Yes	885,683	45.3%	
✓	No	1,069,467	54.7%	

=== Question 2 ===
English Language Education in Public Schools Initiative: Abolishing bilingual education and replacing it with a one-year program of rapid English immersion. A law that would require that, with limited exceptions, all public-school children must be taught all subjects in English.

Question 2: Abolishing bilingual education
Candidate		Votes	%	±
✓	Yes	1,359,935	67.98%	
	No	640,525	32.02%	

=== Question 3 ===
Massachusetts Question 3 (2002)
- Taxpayer Funding for Clean Elections

Results
Choice	Votes	%
Yes	517,285	26.13%
No	1,462,435	73.87%
Valid votes	1,979,720	100.00%
Invalid or blank votes	0	0.00%
Total votes	1,979,720	100.00%

Yes
70–80%
60–70%
50–60%
No
80–90%
70–80%
60–70%
50–60%

Taxpayer funding for Clean Elections. A non-binding question relative to the funding of political campaigns for public office, with the "no" vote indicating voters were not in favor of publicly funded elections. This was a reversal of opinion against the Clean Elections Law passed by voter referendum in 1988. The law was repealed by the legislature as part of the 2003 state budget. The legislature had refused to fund the law, which prompted state courts to order the sale of a disused state hospital, state-owned automobiles, and desks and sofas in the offices of legislative leaders Thomas M. Finneran, Salvatore F. DiMasi, and Joseph F. Wagner.

Question 3: Taxpayer funding for Clean Elections
Candidate		Votes	%	±
✓	No	1,462,435	73.87%	
	Yes	517,285	26.13%	
