= Disciple =

A disciple is a follower and student of a mentor, teacher, or other figure. It can refer to:

== Religion ==
- Disciple (Christianity), a student of Jesus Christ
- Twelve Apostles of Jesus, sometimes called the Twelve Disciples
- Seventy disciples in the Gospel of Luke
- Christian Church (Disciples of Christ), a mainline Protestant denomination in the United States and Canada with roots in the Restoration Movement often referred to as "the Disciples"
- Disciples of Christ (Campbell Movement), a movement founded by Alexander and Thomas Campbell in 1809 which merged with the Christians (Stone Movement) in 1832 to form the Restoration Movement
- Disciples of `Abdu'l-Bahá, 19 Western Bahá'ís
- The ten principal disciples of Buddha
- Disciples of Confucius
- Disciples of Jesus in Islam
- Student of Kriya Yoga, of direct lineage to Mahavatar Babaji
- Sahabah, the disciples of Muhammad
- Follower of Paramahansa Yogananda
- Śishya, the disciple in the Guru–shishya tradition of Hinduism
- Śrāvaka (Sanskrit) or savaka (Pali), disciples in Buddhism and Jainism
- Tarmida ('disciple'), a junior priest in Mandaeism

== Books, games, and films ==
- The Disciple (novel), an 1889 novel by Paul Bourget
- Disciple (film), a 2013 Finnish film
- Disciples (film), a 2014 American horror film
- Disciple (Image Comics), a character of the Spawn comic book series
- The Disciples (Demonata), demon hunters in the Demonata novels by Darren Shan
- The Disciples (novel) (1993), a spy novel by Joe Andrew
- Disciples: Sacred Lands, a computer game published by Strategy First in 1999
- Disciples II: Dark Prophecy, a computer game released in 2002
- Disciples III: Renaissance, a computer game released in 2010
- The Disciple (2020 film), a 2020 Indian film

== Music ==
- Disciple (band), Christian metal band
  - Disciple (album), 2005 studio album by the band
- The Disciples (band), a London reggae band
- Disciples (production team), British production trio
- xDISCIPLEx A.D., a Christian hardcore punk band
- "Disciple", a song by Nas on the album Street's Disciple
- "Disciple", a song by Raven on the album Architect of Fear
- "Disciple", a song by Slayer on the album God Hates Us All
- "Disciples" (song), a song by Tame Impala on the album Currents
- Disciple Records, a British-American independent electronic music record label

== Other ==
- The Disciple, the ring name of professional wrestler Brutus Beefcake
- Black Disciples, a street gang based in Chicago, Illinois
- Gangster Disciples, a street gang based in Chicago, Illinois

== See also ==
- Apostle (disambiguation)
- Disciples of Christ (disambiguation)
