= Daniel Carey =

Daniel Carey may refer to:

- Daniel R. Carey, member of the Massachusetts House of Representatives
- Dan Carey (lacrosse) (born 1982), lacrosse player for the Toronto Rock
- Dan Carey (record producer) (born 1969), London-based producer, writer, mixer and remixer
- Dan Carey (curler) (born 1954), Canadian curler
- Danny Carey (born 1961), American drummer
- Daniel Carey (physician) (born 1960), cardiologist and health secretary to Virginia governor Ralph Northam
