= Massachusetts House of Representatives' 2nd Hampshire district =

American legislative district

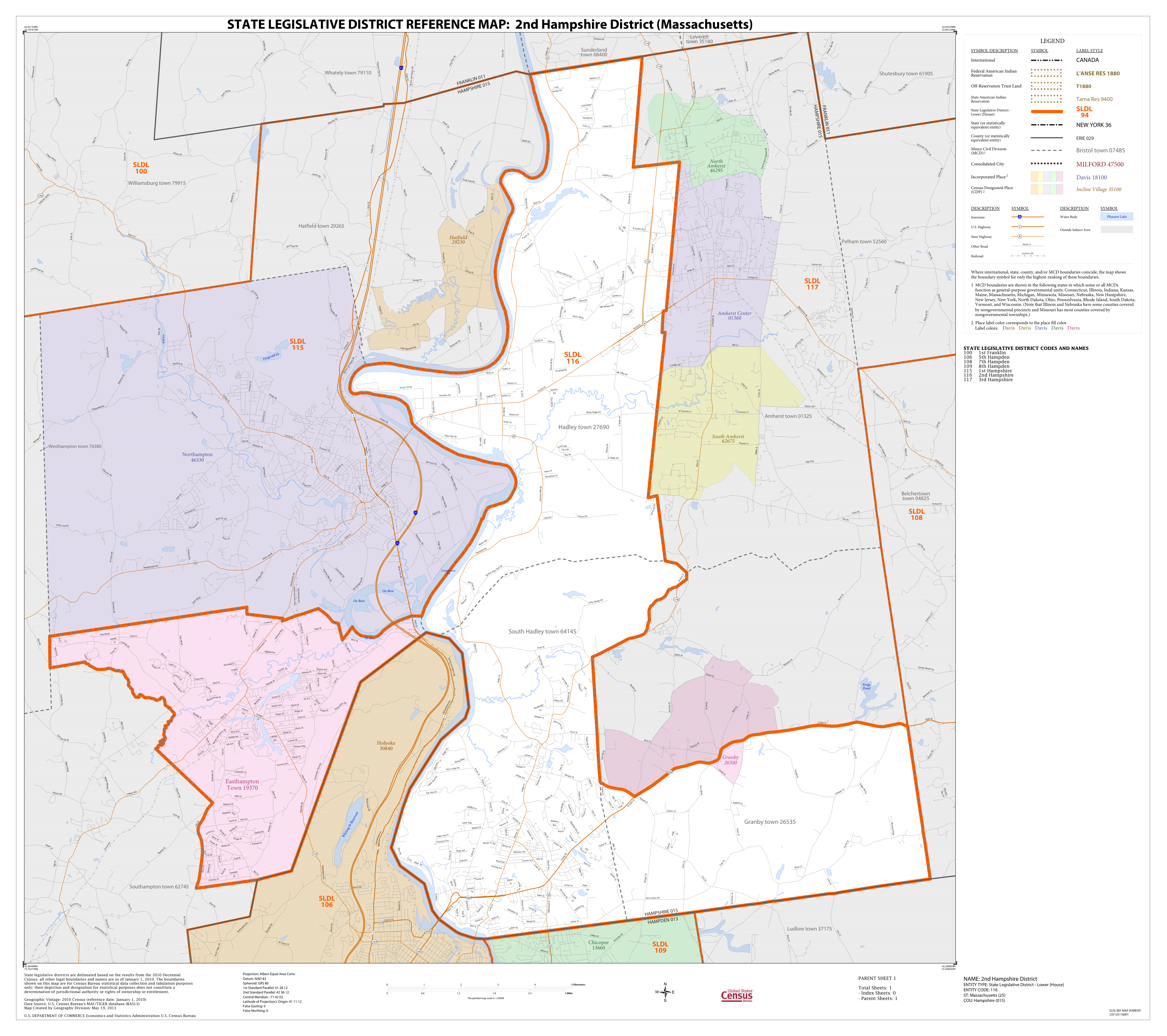
Map of Massachusetts House of Representatives' 2nd Hampshire district, based on the 2010 United States census.

The Massachusetts House of Representatives 2nd Hampshire district or "2nd Hampshire" is an electoral district for the Massachusetts House of Representatives. It consists of the towns of South Hadley, Easthampton, Hadley and precinct 2 of Granby. Democrat Homar Gomez has represented the district since 2025.

The current district geographic boundary overlaps with those of the Massachusetts Senate's 1st Hampden and Hampshire district, 2nd Hampden and Hampshire district, and Hampshire, Franklin and Worcester district.

== District history ==
The district has existed in its current form since 2011, but has existed in name since at least 1970.

=== Former locales ===
The district previously covered:

- Chesterfield, circa 1872, 1927
- Cummington, circa 1872, 1927
- Goshen, circa 1872, 1927
- Huntington, circa 1927
- Middlefield, circa 1872, 1927
- Plainfield, circa 1872, 1927
- Southampton, circa 1927
- Westhampton, circa 1927
- Williamsburg, circa 1927
- Worthington, circa 1872, 1927

== Representatives ==
- Albert D. Sanders, circa 1859
- Frank E. Lyman, 1915–1922

Representative	Party	Years
James Nolen	Democratic	1971 to 1973
James Collins	Democratic	1973 to 1975
William Carey	Democratic	1975 to 1987
Shannon O'Brien	Democratic	1987 to 1993
Nancy Flavin	Democratic	1993 to 2003
John Scibak	Democratic	2003 to 2018
Daniel R. Carey	Democratic	2019 to 2025
Homar Gomez	Democratic	2025 to present

== Elections ==
Election data comes from Massachusetts Election Statistics.

=== 2016 ===
Candidate	Party	Votes	%
John Scibak	Democratic	19,023	99.3%
Others		138	0.7%
Blank		5,056	
Total		24,217	100%

=== 2014 ===
Candidate	Party	Votes	%
John Scibak	Democratic	12,249	99.1%
Others		115	0.9%
Blank		3,735	
Total		16,099	100%

=== 2012 ===
Candidate	Party	Votes	%
John Scibak	Democratic	17,881	99.3%
Others		121	0.7%
Blank		4,786	
Total		22,788	100%

=== 2010 ===
Candidate	Party	Votes	%
John Scibak	Democratic	11,756	99%
Others		118	1%
Blank		3,168	
Total		15,042	100%

=== 2008 ===
Candidate	Party	Votes	%
John Scibak	Democratic	16,628	99.7%
Others		43	0.3%
Blank		4,471	
Total		21,142	100%

== See also ==
- Other Hampshire County districts of the Massachusetts House of Representatives: 1st, 3rd
- Hampshire County districts of the Massachusett Senate: Berkshire, Hampshire, Franklin, and Hampden; 1st Hampden and Hampshire; 2nd Hampden and Hampshire; Hampshire, Franklin and Worcester
- List of former districts of the Massachusetts House of Representatives

== Images ==
Portraits of legislators

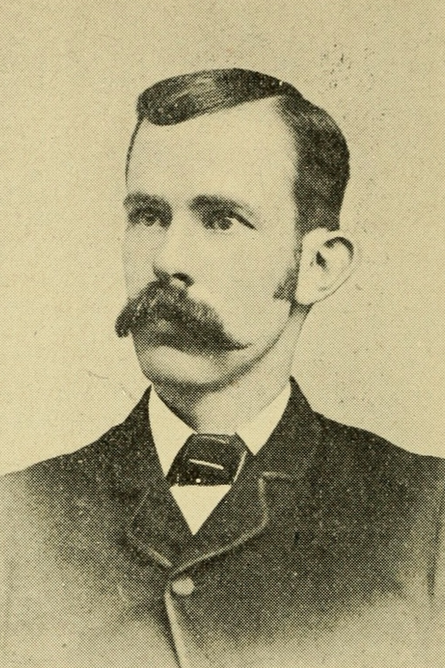
John Bryan

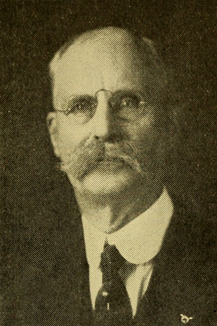
Frederick Judd

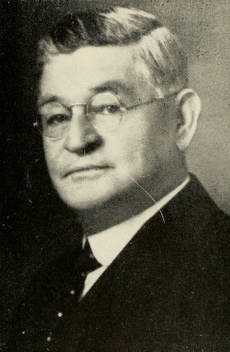
Michael O'Brien

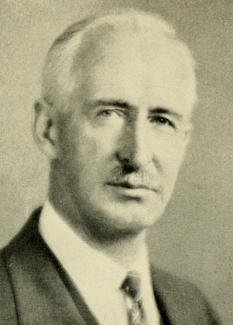
George Barrus

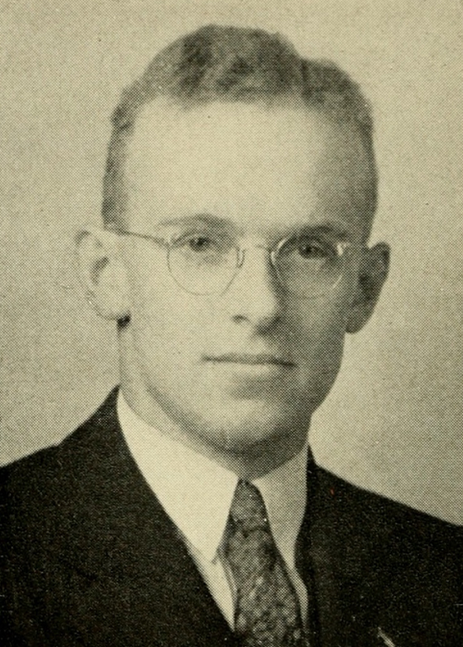
Charles Bisbee

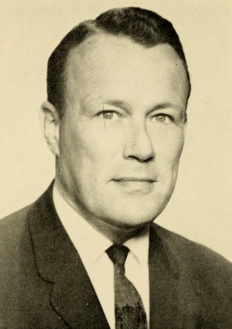
Donald Madsen

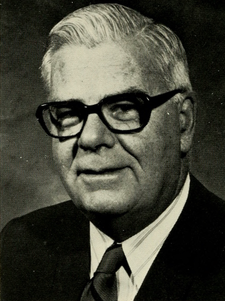
William Carey

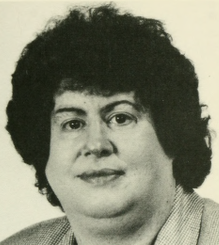
Nancy Flavin

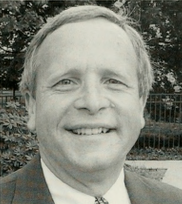
John Scibak

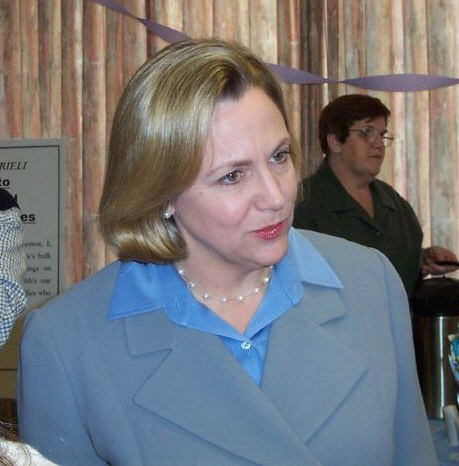
Shannon O'Brien
