= 2002 Massachusetts gubernatorial election =

- November 5, 2002
- Turnout: 55.29% ▲4.1
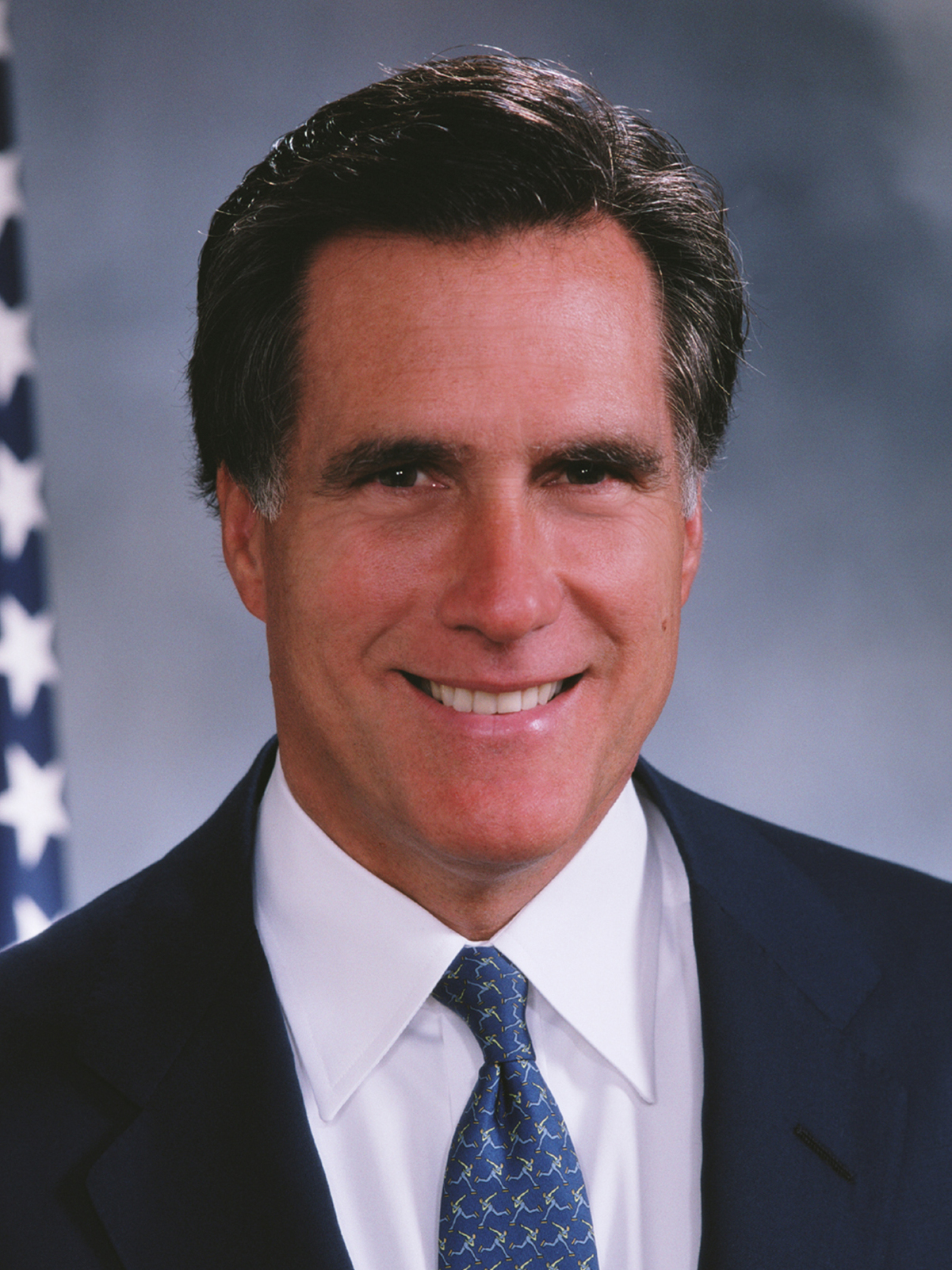

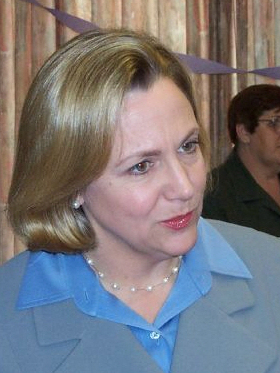
Nominee	Mitt Romney	Shannon O'Brien
Party	Republican	Democratic
Running mate	Kerry Healey	Chris Gabrieli
Popular vote	1,091,988	985,981
Percentage	49.18%	44.40%
- Romney: 40–50% 50–60% 60–70% 70–80% O'Brien: 40–50% 50–60% 60–70% 70–80% 80–90% >90% Tie: 40–50%
Governor before election
Jane Swift (acting)
Republican
Elected Governor
Mitt Romney
Republican

The 2002 Massachusetts gubernatorial election was held on November 5, 2002 to elect the governor and lieutenant governor of Massachusetts. Republican incumbent Jane Swift chose not to seek a full term in office. In the open race, Republican businessman Mitt Romney defeated Democratic state treasurer Shannon O'Brien with a plurality of the vote.

Primary elections were held on September 17. Romney, who was broadly popular within his party, had cleared the field early after forcing Swift to retire. O'Brien won the Democratic nomination with a third of the vote, defeating former U.S. labor secretary Robert Reich, Massachusetts Senate president Tom Birmingham, and former state senator Warren Tolman. Reich's campaign attracted support from progressives and leftists, but he was sharply opposed by the national party establishment for his past criticisms of former president Bill Clinton. Clinton endorsed former national Democratic Party chair Steve Grossman, who ran a well-funded campaign but suffered from poor polling and withdrew from the race in July.

This would be the only time Romney won a general election in the state, as in the 2012 presidential election and the 1994 Senate election, he lost every county in the state.

== Republican primary ==
=== Governor ===
==== Candidates ====
- Mitt Romney, businessman and 1994 U.S. Senate nominee

===== Withdrew =====
- Jane Swift, acting governor of Massachusetts since 2001 (withdrew March 19)

In 2002, Republican lieutenant governor Jane Swift was expected to campaign for the governor's office, and she had said she would in October 2001. Swift had been serving as acting governor after Republican governor Paul Cellucci resigned upon being appointed U.S. Ambassador to Canada. However, Swift was viewed as an unpopular executive, and her administration was plagued by political missteps and personal and ethical controversies. Many Republicans viewed her as a liability and considered her unable to win a general election against a Democrat.

Prominent Republican activists campaigned to persuade businessman Mitt Romney, who had previously run for the U.S. Senate from the state, to run for governor. Romney was coming off a successful stint as head of the organizing committee for the 2002 Winter Olympics in Salt Lake City and was also mentioned as a possible candidate for governor of Utah. However, Romney had previously indicated in fall 2001 that he would not challenge a sitting Republican. Massachusetts Republican chair Kerry Healey flew to Utah to personally assess Romney's intentions.

On March 17, Romney flew to Massachusetts; around that time, a Boston Herald poll showed him defeating Swift by a 75 percent to 12 percent margin in a Republican primary. Two days later, Swift declared that she had decided not to seek her party's nomination, citing family reasons and saying, "I believe that this is in the best interest of our state, as it will allow the Republican Party's best chances of holding the governor's office in November." Three hours later, Romney announced his candidacy. Romney was subsequently unopposed in the Republican party primary.

==== Polling ====
Poll source	Dates administered	Mitt Romney	Jane M. Swift
Boston Herald	March 17, 2002	77%	12%

=== Lieutenant governor ===
==== Candidates ====
- Kerry Healey, chair of the Massachusetts Republican Party (ran with Mitt Romney)
- Jim Rappaport, former chair of the Massachusetts Republican Party and 1990 U.S. Senate nominee

===== Withdrew =====
- Donna Cuomo, former state representative from North Andover
- Patrick Guerriero, deputy chief of staff to Jane Swift and former mayor of Melrose (ran with Jane Swift; endorsed Healey)

===== Declined =====
- Frank Cousins, Essex County sheriff
- Daniel Grabauskas, Massachusetts registrar of motor vehicles (ran for Treasurer and Receiver-General)
- Ralph C. Martin II, Suffolk County district attorney
- Christy Mihos, member of the Massachusetts Turnpike Authority

Jim Rappaport, the Republican nominee for United States Senate in 1990 and a political adversary of Jane Swift, was the first Republican to declare his candidacy for lieutenant governor.

In February, Swift named Patrick Guerriero, her deputy chief of staff, as her running mate after multiple others, including Christy Mihos, declined. Guerriero was the nation's first openly gay candidate for lieutenant governor.

After Swift withdrew and Romney entered the race, he selected Kerry Healey to be his running mate, and Healey resigned as chair of the Massachusetts Republican Party. Shortly thereafter, Guerriero dropped out and gave his support to Healey. Rappaport remained in the race.

==== Results ====
Massachusetts Republican lieutenant gubernatorial primary, 2002
Party	Candidate	Votes	%
Republican	Kerry Healey	159,667	62.76
Republican	Jim Rappaport	88,061	34.62
Write-in		241	0.09
Total votes		247,969	100.00

== Democratic primary ==
=== Governor ===
==== Candidates ====
- Thomas Birmingham, president of the Massachusetts Senate
- Shannon O'Brien, Massachusetts treasurer and receiver-general
- Robert Reich, former U.S. labor secretary
- Warren Tolman, former state senator from Watertown and 1998 lieutenant governor nominee

===== Withdrew =====
- Steve Grossman, former chair of the DNC and president of AIPAC

The leader in most of the polls conducted was O'Brien, who was a longtime insider with four generations of heritage in the Massachusetts political establishment. However, she faced criticism for some of losing investments she had made as state treasurer.

Reich's candidacy attracted considerable media attention, especially due to the 1997 publication of his memoir of working for the Clinton administration, Locked in the Cabinet. Reich had received criticism for embellishing events with invented dialogue, and the book had so angered Bill Clinton that he endorsed Steve Grossman in the race instead.

Of the Democrats running, only Tolman elected to accept public funding.

==== Polling ====
Poll source	Dates administered	Shannon O'Brien	Tom Birmingham	Robert Reich	Warren Tolman
Boston Globe/WBZ-TV	September 13, 2002	31%	22%	22%	13%

==== Results ====
In the September 17, 2002, primary, O'Brien won with 33 percent of the vote; Reich came in second with 25 percent, followed by 24 percent for Birmingham and 18 percent for Tolman (Grossman had dropped out before then).

Democratic primary results by municipality

Massachusetts Democratic gubernatorial primary, 2002
Party	Candidate	Votes	%
Democratic	Shannon O'Brien	243,039	32.52
Democratic	Robert Reich	185,315	24.80
Democratic	Tom Birmingham	179,703	24.05
Democratic	Warren Tolman	132,157	17.69
Democratic	Steve Grossman (withdrawn)	5,976	0.80
Write-in		1,113	0.15
Total votes		747,303	100.00

=== Lieutenant governor ===
==== Candidates ====
- Chris Gabrieli, businessman
- Lois Pines, former State Senator from Newton
- John P. Slattery, State Representative from Peabody

===== Eliminated at convention =====
- Sarah Cannon Holden

===== Withdrew =====
- Cheryl A. Jacques, State Senator from Needham (ran for 9th congressional district)
- Stephen Lynch, State Senator from South Boston (ran for 9th congressional district)

Gabrieli was the running mate of Shannon O'Brien, while Slattery and Pines were not affiliated with any candidate.

==== Results ====
Massachusetts Democratic lieutenant gubernatorial primary, 2002
Party	Candidate	Votes	%
Democratic	Chris Gabrieli	306,043	46.18
Democratic	Lois Pines	205,208	30.96
Democratic	John P. Slattery	150,313	22.68
Write-in		1,185	0.18
Total votes		662,749	100.00

== General election ==
=== Candidates ===
- Carla Howell, 2000 U.S. Senate nominee (Libertarian)
  - Running mate: Rich Aucoin, mechanical designer and 2001 Waltham city council candidate
- Barbara C. Johnson (Independent)
  - Running mate: Joe Schebel, self-employed carpenter
- Shannon O'Brien, treasurer and receiver-general of Massachusetts (Democratic)
  - Running mate: Chris Gabrieli
- Mitt Romney, businessman and 1994 U.S. Senate nominee (Republican)
  - Running mate: Kerry Healey, former chair of the Massachusetts Republican Party
- Jill Stein, internist at Simmons College Health Center (Green-Rainbow)
  - Running mate: Tony Lorenzen, high school theology teacher

=== Question of Romney's residency ===
Before the primaries concluded, Democratic officials claimed that Romney was ineligible to run for governor, citing residency issues. The Massachusetts Constitution requires that a gubernatorial candidate be an "inhabitant" for seven consecutive years prior to a run for office.

Romney had attended business and law school at Harvard and spent his entire business career in Massachusetts until being hired to organize the Salt Lake Olympics in 1999. In 1999, Romney had listed himself as a part-time Massachusetts resident, Romney had claimed residency in Utah from 1999 to 2002, during his time as president of the Salt Lake Organizing Committee and received a $54,000 property tax break there. Romney now offered to pay back that exemption. Romney said that he had planned to return to Massachusetts all along.

On June 8, 2002, the Massachusetts Democratic Party filed a complaint with the Massachusetts State Ballot Law Commission, which tended to be lenient in its interpretations of the requirements for residency. At the time the commission was composed of three Republicans, one Democrat and one independent. On June 25, 2002, the commission unanimously ruled that Romney was eligible to run for office, saying that "[Romney] never severed his ties to Massachusetts [and] his testimony was credible in all respects." The ruling was not challenged in court, and Romney accused the Democrats of playing "ridiculous, dirty politics".

=== Campaign ===
Romney ran as a political outsider and as an agent of change, saying he would "clean up the mess on Beacon Hill." He said he was "not a partisan Republican" but rather a "moderate" with "progressive" views. Romney declared support for faith-based initiatives and campaigned as a pro-choice candidate who would protect a woman's right to an abortion. He rejected the endorsement of Massachusetts Citizens for Life, an anti-abortion organization. O'Brien claimed Romney was "trying to mask a very conservative set of belief systems". While saying she would not criticize his membership in the Church of Jesus Christ of Latter-day Saints, she attacked his substantial donations to Brigham Young University, objecting to their bar on expressions of homosexuality. O'Brien came out in support of same-sex marriage.

Romney supporters hailed his business record, especially his success with the 2002 Olympics, as indicating he would be able to bring a new era of efficiency into Massachusetts politics. His campaign was the first to use microtargeting techniques, in which small groups of voters were reached with narrowly tailored messaging.

Romney proposed to reorganize the state government and stressed his ability to obtain federal funds for the state. Romney said he would cut $1 billion out of the $23 billion state budget by eliminating waste, fraud, and mismanagement while still reducing taxes over a phased period. He also said he was generally against tax increases but refused to rule out the possibility of a tax increase. He did attempt to paint O'Brien as a "tax-and-spend liberal."

O'Brien's campaign was hobbled by the primary, which had exhausted her campaign's time and resources. With less than two months before Election Day, she had exhausted most of her funds by spending $4.5 million to win the nomination. Romney, who had been able to focus on the general election in the absence of any primary contest, contributed over $6 million to his own campaign during the election, a state record at the time. He also raised nearly $10 million for his campaign overall.

O'Brien focused her attacks by portraying Romney as being out of place in Massachusetts. Romney had stumbled earlier in the year by not knowing that "MCAS" stood for the Massachusetts Comprehensive Assessment System of school exams. To soften Romney's image, his campaign staged a series of "work days" over the summer, in which he performed blue-collar jobs such as herding cows, baling hay, unloading a fishing boat, and hauling garbage. Television ads highlighting the work day effort, as well as one portraying his family in gushing terms and showing him shirtless, received a poor public response. O'Brien responded, "Massachusetts doesn't need a governor who thinks getting in touch with working people is a costume party."

By mid-October, O'Brien led in most polls. Romney responded with negative ads that accused O'Brien of mismanaging state pension funds. One ad featured a Basset Hound sleeping as men removed bags of money from the Massachusetts treasury. Another associated her husband, former lobbyist Emmet Hayes, with the Enron scandal.

Jill Stein campaigned against requiring MCAS tests to graduate high school and in support of clean air and bilingual education.

=== Debates ===
In the debates, O'Brien attacked Romney repeatedly. He referred to her style as "unbecoming," which led to criticism that he was insensitive to women.

After being excluded from the first debate, Stein and independent candidate Barbara Johnson sued the media organizers of the debate. Middlesex Superior Court judge Linda Giles ruled against Stein and Johnson, stating that the state's campaign finance laws did not apply to press-organized political debates and invitations to O'Brien and Romney did not constitute a campaign contribution.

=== Predictions ===
Source	Ranking	As of
The Cook Political Report	Tossup	October 31, 2002
Sabato's Crystal Ball	Lean D (flip)	November 4, 2002

=== Polling ===
Poll source	Date(s) administered	Shannon O'Brien (D)	Mitt Romney (R)	Other
Boston Herald	February 27, 2002	32%	38%	–
Boston Herald	September 20, 2002	45%	42%	–
Institute of Politics/NECN	October 2–3, 2002	40%	40%	–
RKM Research and Communications	October 4, 2002	43%	42%	–
Institute of Politics/NECN	October 24–27, 2002	41%	39%	11%
Boston Herald	October 29, 2002	44%	38%	–
Boston Globe/WBZ	November 1, 2002	41%	40%	–

Hypothetical polling

with Jane Swift

Poll source	Date(s) administered	Jane Swift (R)	Shannon O'Brien (D)	Robert Reich (D)	Tom Birmingham (D)	Steve Grossman (D)	Warren Tolman (D)	Bill Galvin (D)	Marty Meehan (D)
Boston Herald	February 18, 2001	23%	–	–	–	–	–	–	37%
Boston Herald	February 18, 2001	25%	–	–	–	–	–	37%	–
Boston Herald	February 18, 2001	25%	–	–	37%	–	–	–	–
Boston Herald	February 18, 2001	25%	–	–	–	25%	–	–	–
Boston Herald	February 18, 2001	25%	–	–	–	–	26%	–	–
Boston Globe	January 27, 2002	21%	39%	–	–	–	–	–	–
Boston Globe	January 27, 2002	23%	–	–	35%	–	–	–	–
Boston Globe	January 27, 2002	23%	–	35%	–	–	–	–	–
Boston Globe	January 27, 2002	23%	–	–	–	–	–	33%	–
Boston Globe	January 27, 2002	25%	–	–	–	27%	–	–	–
Boston Globe	January 27, 2002	24%	–	–	–	–	28%	–	–

with Robert Reich

Poll source	Date(s) administered	Robert Reich (D)	Mitt Romney (R)	Other
Boston Herald	February 27, 2002	31%	40%	–

=== Results ===
Romney and Healey were elected governor and lieutenant governor with 49.2 percent of the vote over O'Brien and Gabrieli, who received 44.4 percent. Romney performed strongly with Republicans and won many independents in the belt between Route 128 and I-495. He ran almost even with O'Brien in smaller, working-class cities and held down Democratic margins in large urban areas. This was the fourth consecutive win for Republicans in Massachusetts gubernatorial elections.

Massachusetts gubernatorial election, 2002
Party	Candidate	Votes	%	±%
Republican	Mitt Romney	1,091,988	49.77%	▼1.10
Democratic	Shannon O'Brien	985,981	44.94%	▼2.50
Green-Rainbow	Jill Stein	76,530	3.49%	N/A
Libertarian	Carla Howell	23,044	1.05%	▼0.64
Independent	Barbara Johnson	15,335	0.69%	N/A
Write-in		1,301	0.06%	▼0.05
Total votes		2,194,179	100.00%	
None	Blank ballots	26,122	1.17%	
Turnout		2,220,301		
Republican hold		Swing	+1.40	

==== Results by county ====

2002 United States gubernatorial election in Massachusetts (by county)
County	Romney - R %	Romney - R #	O'Brien - D %	O'Brien - D #	Others %	Others #	Total #
Barnstable	56.3%	57,466	38.9%	39,640	4.7%	4,887	101,993
Berkshire	32.2%	13,897	62.5%	26,963	5.3%	2,281	43,141
Bristol	45.0%	71,189	50.7%	80,275	4.4%	6,860	158,324
Dukes	40.4%	2,815	53.0%	3,688	6.6%	458	6,961
Essex	55.5%	141,932	39.4%	100,798	5.1%	12,816	255,546
Franklin	35.7%	9,381	55.0%	14,438	9.3%	2,455	26,274
Hampden	48.8%	66,114	46.9%	63,470	4.3%	5,792	135,376
Hampshire	33.7%	18,358	59.1%	32,229	7.2%	3,918	54,505
Middlesex	49.4%	267,579	44.6%	241,934	5.9%	32,418	541,931
Nantucket	50.3%	1,974	44.5%	1,746	5.2%	204	3,924
Norfolk	53.4%	140,440	41.9%	110,198	4.7%	12,280	262,918
Plymouth	57.6%	100,029	38.0%	65,978	4.4%	7,757	173,764
Suffolk	34.5%	60,623	59.9%	105,280	5.6%	9,776	175,679
Worcester	55.2%	140,191	39.1%	99,344	5.6%	14,308	253,843

Counties that flipped from Democratic to Republican

- Middlesex (largest municipality: Cambridge)

Counties that flipped from Republican to Democratic

- Berkshire (largest municipality: Pittsfield)
- Bristol (largest municipality: New Bedford)

== Aftermath ==
Ten years later, Romney and Stein ran against each other in the 2012 U.S. presidential election, with both losing to incumbent Democratic incumbent Barack Obama.

== See also ==
- Massachusetts general election, 2002
- Governorship of Mitt Romney
- 2001–2002 Massachusetts legislature
