= Bob Deitrick =

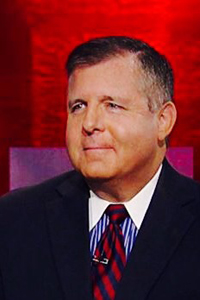
- Born: September 17, 1961 (age 64); Alexandria, Virginia
- Education: Ohio State University (1984)
- Occupations: Author, financial advisor, business owner
- Children: Mitchell Deitrick, Mallory Deitrick
- Website: Polaris Financial Partners Bulls Bears and the Ballot Box

Bob Deitrick is an American author and the principal owner of Polaris Financial Partners, LLC in Westerville, Ohio. He has appeared on numerous local and national television networks discussing various financial and political topics and he has appeared on the Fox Business Network discussing the results of his book Bulls Bears and the Ballot Box co-written with Lew Goldfarb.

== Early life ==
Deitrick graduated from The Ohio State University in 1984 with a degree in Finance and Economics. He went on to work with Cigna Individual Financial Services and then with Lincoln Financial Group for 21 years. Deitrick created his own independent wealth management practice Polaris Financial Partners, LLC, in tandem with Cadaret, Grant & Company in 2003 with business partner Steven Morgan. Deitrick has had numerous television appearances regionally and nationally including Fox Business News, MSNBC, ONN, WCMH and WBNS discussing various financial topics including the stock market, financial planning as well as his book. Deitrick has taught financial planning as an adjunct professor at The Ohio State University and was the co-founder of Ohio States Foundation for Excellence in Financial Planning. Deitrick created several pilot classes in high schools in financial literacy in Columbus as well.

== Career ==
=== Polaris Financial Partners, LLC ===
Polaris Financial Partners is a wealth‑management firm founded by Bob Deitrick in 2003. His Chief Investment Advisor is William B. Harrigan, Esq. who is also the firms legal counsel. Owen Osborne is a partner and the firms Chief Operations Officer.

Polaris Financial manages and oversees $250 million in client assets and provides advisory services to over 170 individual clients. Its clientele primarily includes affluent retirees, business owners, and professionals seeking comprehensive financial and wealth management planning.

The firm operates as a boutique advisory practice, emphasizing a personalized approach to develop a long‑term financial strategy focusing on synthetic dividends. Polaris’ work centers on integrating investment management, client service, and creating a client experience within a single advisory framework.

=== Bulls Bears and the Ballot Box ===
Bob Deitrick along with Lew Goldfarb published Bulls Bears and the Ballot Box on July 1, 2012. The book examines presidents Herbert Hoover through Barack Obama, ranking them according to their performance in three distinct economic categories. The authors review 80 years of our nation's economic history from the Great Depression and Herbert Hoover to the Great Recession and George W. Bush; a time period in which the Democratic and Republican Parties occupied the Oval Office for 40 years each. Adam Hartung of Forbes said of the book, "Their compendium of economic facts is the most illuminating document on economic performance during different administrations, and policies, than anything previously published." Hartung has written five articles in tandem with Bob Deitrick, of Polaris Financial Partners, which have produced, in aggregate, 2 million views between the five articles with Hartung and they rank #’s 1,3, and 4 among Hartung's most popular articles in Forbes. Bulls Bears and the Ballot Box has been featured in Forbes, the International Business Times, The Christian Science Monitor and U.S. News & World Report among many others publications, and the book has been endorsed by David Wilhelm, former chairman of the DNC, and Governor Ted Strickland of Ohio.

== Publications ==
- Bulls Bears and the Ballot Box: How the Performance of Our presidents Has Impacted Your Wallet. Charleston: Advantage Media Group, 2012.
