= Emmet Hayes =

American politician

Member of the Massachusetts House of Representatives from the 7th Plymouth district
- In office 1983–1991
- Preceded by: Andrew Card
- Succeeded by: Michael Sullivan

Personal details
- Born: February 11, 1951 (age 75) Brockton, Massachusetts, U.S.
- Party: Democratic
- Spouse: Shannon O'Brien
- Education: Northeastern University; University of Massachusetts Boston
- Occupation: Lobbyist; Politician

Robert Emmet Hayes (born February 11, 1951) is an American lobbyist and politician who represented the 7th Plymouth District in the Massachusetts House of Representatives from 1983 to 1991.

In the late 1980s Hayes sponsored legislation to help Massachusetts cities and towns meet the requirements of the federal Clean Water Act. Hayes' legislation, the Massachusetts Clean Water Act, resulted in a State Revolving Fund which allocated $900 million in no-interest loans for planning, design or construction of waste-water projects in 85 Massachusetts communities.

Hayes lost re-election in 1990 to Abington lawyer Michael Sullivan. He later became a lobbyist.

He is the husband of former Treasurer and Receiver-General of Massachusetts Shannon O'Brien. Hayes' role as a lobbyist for Enron became a campaign issue during his wife's 2002 gubernatorial run. However, as the Boston Globe reported, "Hayes stopped lobbying for (Enron) nearly two years before accounting fraud surfaced and its stock price plummeted."

Hayes is a veteran of the United States Navy, and holds a degree from the University of Massachusetts Boston.
