= John Scibak =

American politician

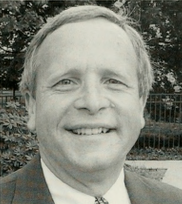
- Portrait of John W. Scibak

Member of the Massachusetts House of Representatives from the 2nd Hampshire district
- In office 2003–2018
- Preceded by: Nancy Flavin
- Succeeded by: Daniel R. Carey

Personal details
- Born: May 4, 1953 (age 73) Woonsocket, Rhode Island
- Party: Democratic
- Spouse: Patricia Scibak
- Education: University of Notre Dame
- Occupation: Psychologist; Politician

John W. Scibak (born May 4, 1953) is an American politician who represents the 2nd Hampshire District in the Massachusetts House of Representatives. He is a former South Hadley, Massachusetts Town Meeting Member (1990–2002) and was a member of the South Hadley Board of Selectmen from 1991 to 2002.

He was born in Woonsocket, Rhode Island.
