= Nancy Flavin =

American politician

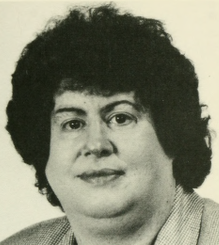

Member of the Massachusetts House of Representatives from the 2nd Hampshire district
- In office 1993–2003
- Preceded by: Shannon O'Brien
- Succeeded by: John Scibak

Personal details
- Born: June 26, 1950 (age 76) Northampton, Massachusetts
- Party: Democratic
- Education: University of Massachusetts Amherst
- Occupation: Politician

Nancy Flavin (born June 26, 1950, in Northampton, Massachusetts) is an American politician who represented the 2nd Hampshire District in the Massachusetts House of Representatives from 1993 to 2003.
