= Jill Stein =

American politician and physician (born 1950)

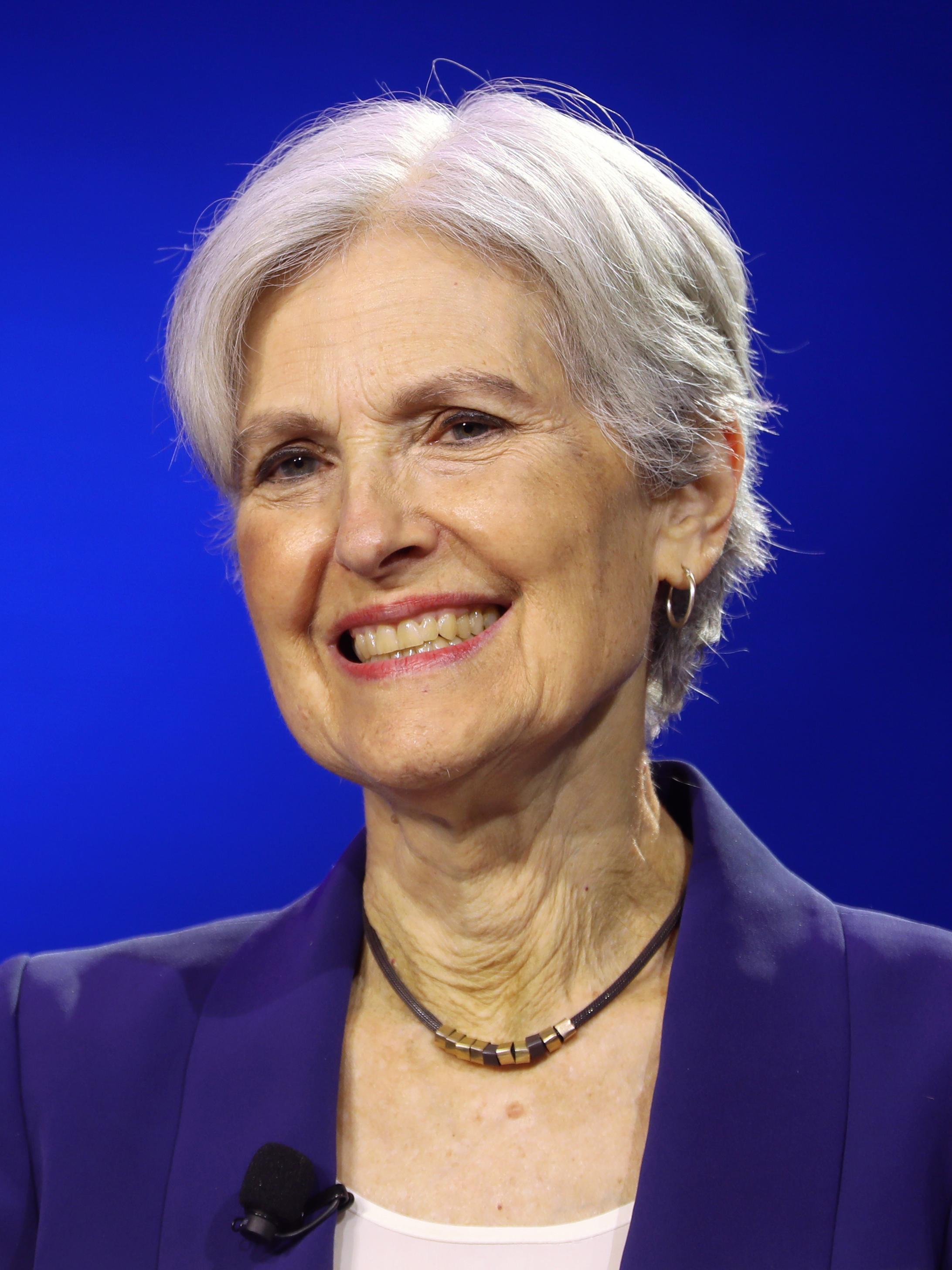
- Stein in 2024

Member of the Lexington Town Meeting from the 2nd precinct
- In office 2005–2010
- Preceded by: Multiple members
- Succeeded by: Multiple members

Personal details
- Born: Jill Ellen Stein; May 14, 1950 (age 76) Chicago, Illinois, U.S.
- Party: Green
- Spouse: Richard Rohrer
- Children: 2
- Education: Harvard University (BA, MD)

Jill Ellen Stein (born May 14, 1950) is an American physician and activist, who was the Green Party's nominee for president of the United States in the 2012, 2016, and 2024 elections. She was the Green-Rainbow Party's candidate for governor of Massachusetts in 2002 and 2010.

Stein ran her first political campaign as the Green-Rainbow candidate for governor of Massachusetts in 2002, losing to Republican Mitt Romney. She ran for the same position in 2010, losing to the then-incumbent Massachusetts governor, Democrat Deval Patrick.

In 2017, Stein's presidential campaign was investigated by the Senate Intelligence Committee for possible collusion with the Russian government but was ultimately cleared of any wrongdoing.

== Early life and education ==
Jill Ellen Stein was born on May 14, 1950, in Chicago, Illinois, and raised in the suburb of Highland Park. Her father Joseph was an attorney while her mother Gladys was a stay-at-home mom. Stein was raised in a Reform Jewish household, attending Chicago's North Shore Congregation Israel.

In 1973, Stein graduated magna cum laude from Harvard College. She then attended Harvard Medical School and graduated in 1979. Stein practiced medicine in the Boston area for 25 years. She also served as an instructor in internal medicine at Harvard Medical School.

== Activism and political career ==
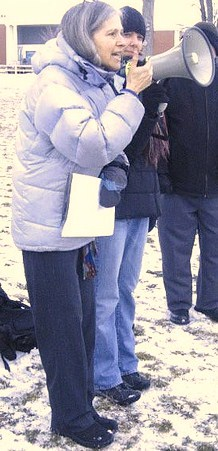
Stein in 2009 at a protest against coal-powered energy production

As a physician, Stein became increasingly concerned about the connection between people's health and the quality of their local environment. She subsequently turned to activism. In 1998, she began protesting the "Filthy Five" coal plants in Massachusetts.

The Clean Election Law provided public funding for candidates not receiving large private donations, and was eventually repealed in 2003 by the Democratic party controlled state legislature. Stein has said that she left the Democratic Party and joined the Green Party when "the Democratic Party killed campaign finance reform in my state".

In a 2024 interview with Haaretz, Stein said the Green Party was an alternative to the "rigid two-party system [in which] both parties are widely regarded as sponsored by and serving the economic elites, and share their core interests. They're both parties of war and of Wall Street. They may differ on social issues, but on core policies they're very much the same".

On August 17, 2026, a warrant was issued for Stein's arrest after she failed to appear in court for charges against her that stem from a Washington University campus protest that occurred in April 2024. Stein was charged with one count of first-degree trespassing and one count of fourth-degree assault. The warrant was subsequently withdrawn the following day and Stein was ordered by the judge to appear in court to face the charges in September 2026.

== Political campaigns ==
=== 2012 presidential campaign ===
==== Primary ====
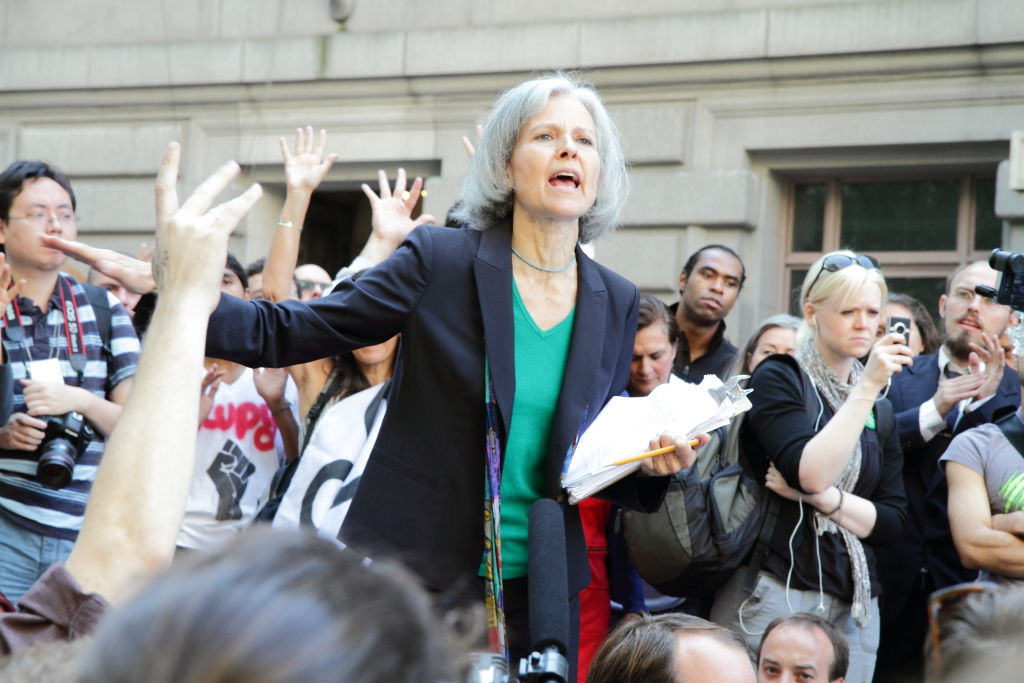
Jill Stein speaking at Occupy Wall Street, September 27, 2011

Stein launched her campaign in October 2011. Her major primary opponents were actress Roseanne Barr and activist Kent Mesplay. Stein proposed the Green New Deal, a government spending plan intended to put 25 million people to work. Mesplay called that unrealistic, saying, "This will take time to implement, and lacks legislative support." Stein became the presumptive Green Party nominee after winning two-thirds of California's delegates in June 2012. On July 1, 2012, the Stein campaign reported it had received enough contributions to qualify for primary season federal matching funds. This made Stein the first Green Party presidential candidate ever to have qualified for federal matching funds. On July 11, Stein selected Cheri Honkala, an anti-poverty activist, as her vice-presidential running mate. On July 14, she officially received the Green Party's nomination at its convention in Baltimore.

==== General ====
On August 1, Stein, Honkala and three others were arrested during a sit-in at a Philadelphia bank to protest housing foreclosures on behalf of several city residents struggling to keep their homes. On October 16, Stein and Honkala were arrested after they tried to enter the site of the presidential debate at Hofstra University while protesting the exclusion of smaller political parties, such as the Green Party, from the debates. On October 31, Stein was arrested in Texas for criminal trespass, after trying to deliver food and supplies to environmental activists of Tar Sands Blockade camped out in trees protesting the construction of the Keystone XL pipeline.

The Free & Equal Elections Foundation hosted a third-party debate with Stein and three other candidates on October 19, followed by a debate between Stein and Gary Johnson held on November 5.

=== 2016 presidential campaign ===
==== Primary ====
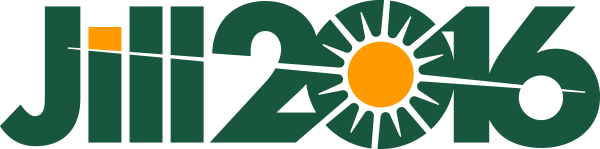
Jill Stein's presidential campaign logo, 2016

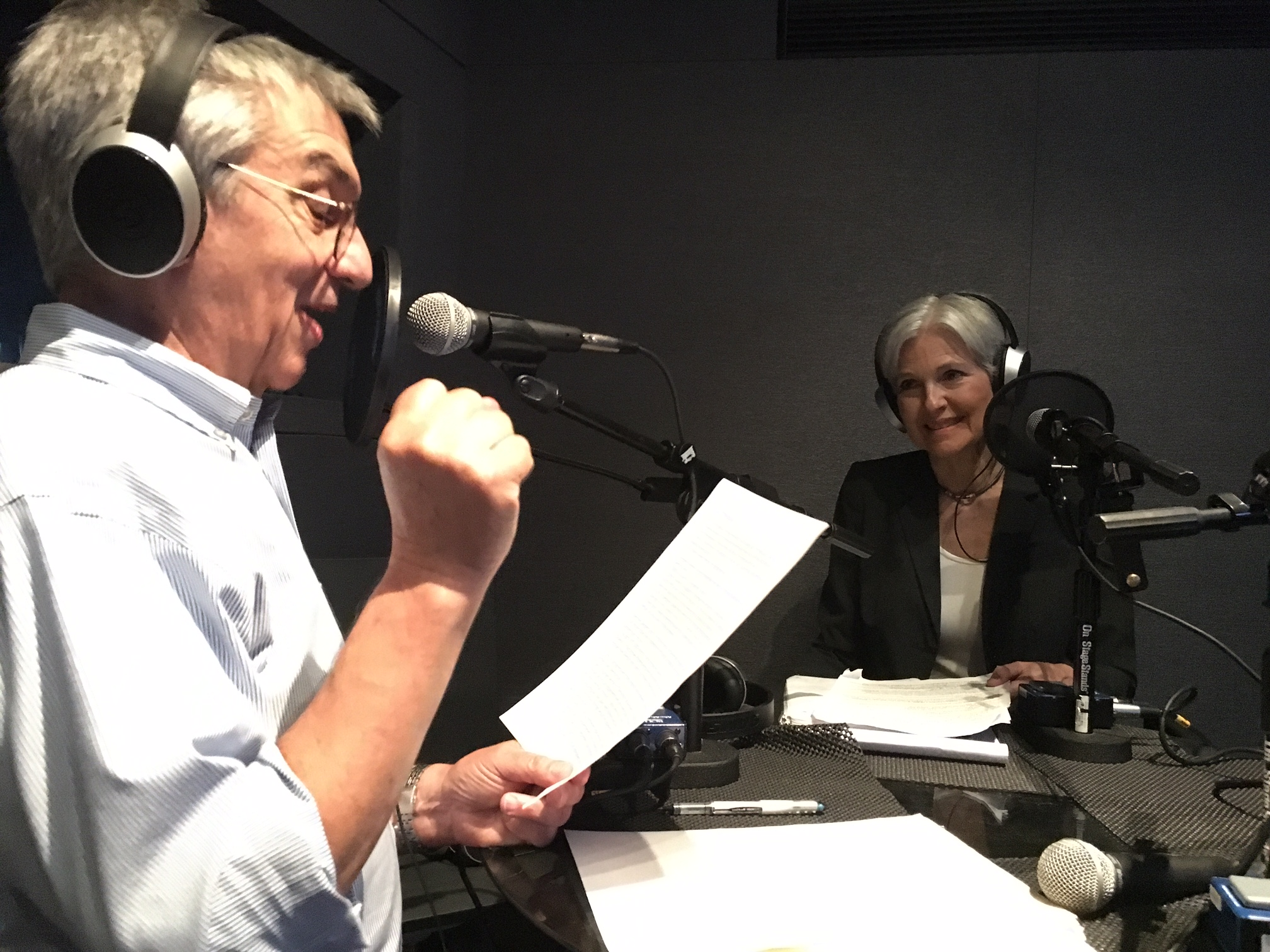
Stein with Jon Wiener, The Nation writer and host of the political podcast Start Making Sense in 2016

On February 6, 2015, Stein announced the formation of an exploratory committee in preparation for a potential campaign for the Green Party's presidential nomination in 2016. On June 22, she formally announced her candidacy in a live interview with Amy Goodman on Democracy Now! After former Ohio state senator Nina Turner reportedly declined to be her running mate, Stein chose human rights activist Ajamu Baraka on August 1, 2016.

Stein's financial disclosure, filed in March 2016, indicated that she maintained investments of as much as $8.5 million, including mutual or index funds that included holdings in industries that she had previously criticized, such as energy, financial, pharmaceutical, tobacco, and defense contractors. In response to questions about her finances, Stein said in part: "Sadly, most of these broad investments are as compromised as the American economy—degraded as it is by the fossil fuel, defense and finance industries", and later characterized the article as a "smear attack" against her.

On September 7, 2016, a North Dakota judge issued a warrant for Stein's arrest for spray-painting a bulldozer during a protest of the Dakota Access Pipeline. Stein was charged in Morton County with misdemeanor counts of criminal trespass and criminal mischief. After the warrant was issued, Stein said that she would cooperate with the North Dakota authorities and arrange a court date. She defended her actions, saying that it would have been "inappropriate for me not to have done my small part" to support the Standing Rock Sioux. In August 2017, she pleaded guilty to misdemeanor criminal mischief and was placed on probation for six months.

==== General ====
Stein said in an interview with Politico that: "Donald Trump, I think, will have a lot of trouble moving things through Congress. Hillary Clinton, on the other hand, won't ... Hillary has the potential to do a whole lot more damage, get us into more wars, faster to pass her fracking disastrous climate program, much more easily than Donald Trump could do his."

In the same interview, Stein said regarding Trump's business dealings and refusal to release his tax returns: "At least with Clinton, you know, there was some degree of transparency, but what's going on with Trump, you can't even get at, and what he said was that even to clarify 15 out of these 500 deals, these are just like the most frightening mafiosos around the world. He's like—he's a magnet for crime and extortion."

Stein's highest polling average in four candidate polls was in late June 2016, when she polled at 4.8% nationally before ending at 1.9% nationally on the eve of election day. Her polling numbers gradually slipped throughout the campaign, consistent with historical trends for minor party candidates.

Stein played a significant role in several crucial battleground states, drawing a vote total in three of them—Wisconsin, Michigan, and Pennsylvania—that exceeded the margin between Donald Trump and Hillary Clinton.

==== Recount fundraising ====
In November 2016, a group of computer scientists and election lawyers including J. Alex Halderman and John Bonifaz (founder of the National Voting Rights Institute) expressed concerns about the integrity of the presidential election results. They wanted a full audit or recount of the presidential election votes in three states key to Donald Trump's electoral college win—Michigan, Wisconsin, and Pennsylvania—but needed a candidate on the presidential ballot to file the petition to state authorities. After unsuccessfully lobbying Hillary Clinton and her team, the group approached Stein and she agreed to spearhead the recount effort.

A crowdfunding campaign launched on November 24, 2016, to support the costs of the recount, raised more than $6.7 million in nearly a week. On November 25, 2016, with 90 minutes remaining on the deadline to petition for a recount to Wisconsin's electoral body, Stein filed for a recount of its presidential election results. She signaled she intended to file for similar recounts in the subsequent days in Michigan and Pennsylvania. President-elect Donald Trump issued a statement denouncing the recount request saying, "The people have spoken and the election is over." Trump further commented that the recount "is a scam by the Green Party for an election that has already been conceded."

On December 2, 2016, Michigan Attorney General Bill Schuette filed a lawsuit to stop Stein's recount. On the same day in Wisconsin a U.S. District Judge denied an emergency halt to the recount, allowing it to continue until a December 9, 2016, hearing. On December 3, 2016, Stein dropped the state recount case in Pennsylvania, citing "the barriers to verifying the vote in Pennsylvania are so pervasive and that the state court system is so ill-equipped to address this problem that we must seek federal court intervention."

Shortly after midnight on December 5, 2016, U.S. District Judge Mark A. Goldsmith ordered Michigan election officials to hand-recount 4.8 million ballots, rejecting all concerns for the cost of the recount. Goldsmith wrote in his order: "As emphasized earlier, budgetary concerns are not sufficiently significant to risk the disenfranchisement of Michigan's nearly 5 million voters". Meanwhile, however, the Michigan Court of Appeals ruled that Stein, who placed fourth, had no chance of winning and was not an "aggrieved candidate" and ordered the Michigan election board to reject her petition for a recount. On December 7, 2016, Judge Goldsmith halted the Michigan recount. Stein filed an appeal with the Michigan Supreme Court, losing her appeal in a 3–2 decision on December 9, 2016.

On December 12, 2016, U.S. District Judge Paul S. Diamond rejected Stein's request for a Pennsylvania recount.

In May 2018, The Daily Beast reported that approximately $1 million of the original $7.3 million had yet to be spent and that there remained uncertainty about what precisely the money had been spent on.

==== Election interference investigation ====
On December 18, 2017, The Washington Post reported that the Senate Intelligence Committee was looking at Stein's presidential campaign for potential "collusion with the Russians." The Stein campaign released a statement stating it would work with investigators. The Committee cleared Stein of any collusion with Russia.

In December 2018, two reports commissioned by the Senate Intelligence Committee found that the Russian-linked Internet Research Agency boosted and promoted Stein's candidacy through social media posts, targeting African-American voters in particular. After consulting the two reports, NBC News reporter Robert Windrem said that nothing suggested Stein knew about the operation. It also highlighted several independent analyses that "add to the growing body of evidence that the Russians worked to boost the Stein campaign as part of the effort to siphon support away from Democratic candidate Hillary Clinton and tilt the election to Trump." Stein was also criticized for sitting at the same table as Russian president Vladimir Putin at the RT 10th anniversary gala in Moscow. Stein said she had attended the event in the hope of speaking to Putin about his policy in Syria, climate change and other issues. Stein, who has regularly appeared on RT and Sputnik during her 2012 and 2016 campaigns, announced her decision to form an exploratory committee to run in 2016 during the U.S.-based RT program "Redacted Tonight" in February 2015. NBC said there was no evidence in the reports to indicate that Stein was aware any influence operation. NBC stated that Stein had been criticised for "her support of international policies that mirror Russian foreign policy goals." Stein regularly appeared on RT.

In an official statement, Stein called one of the reports, the one authored by New Knowledge, "dangerous new McCarthyism" and asked the Senate Committee to retract it, saying the firm was "sponsored by partisan Democratic funders" and had itself been shown to have been "directly involved in election interference" in the 2017 US Senate election in Alabama.

By July 31, 2018, Stein had spent slightly under $100,000 of the recount money on legal representation linked to the Senate probe into election interference. In March 2019, Stein's spokesman David Cobb said she had "fully cooperated with the Senate inquiry."

=== 2024 presidential campaign ===
==== Primary ====
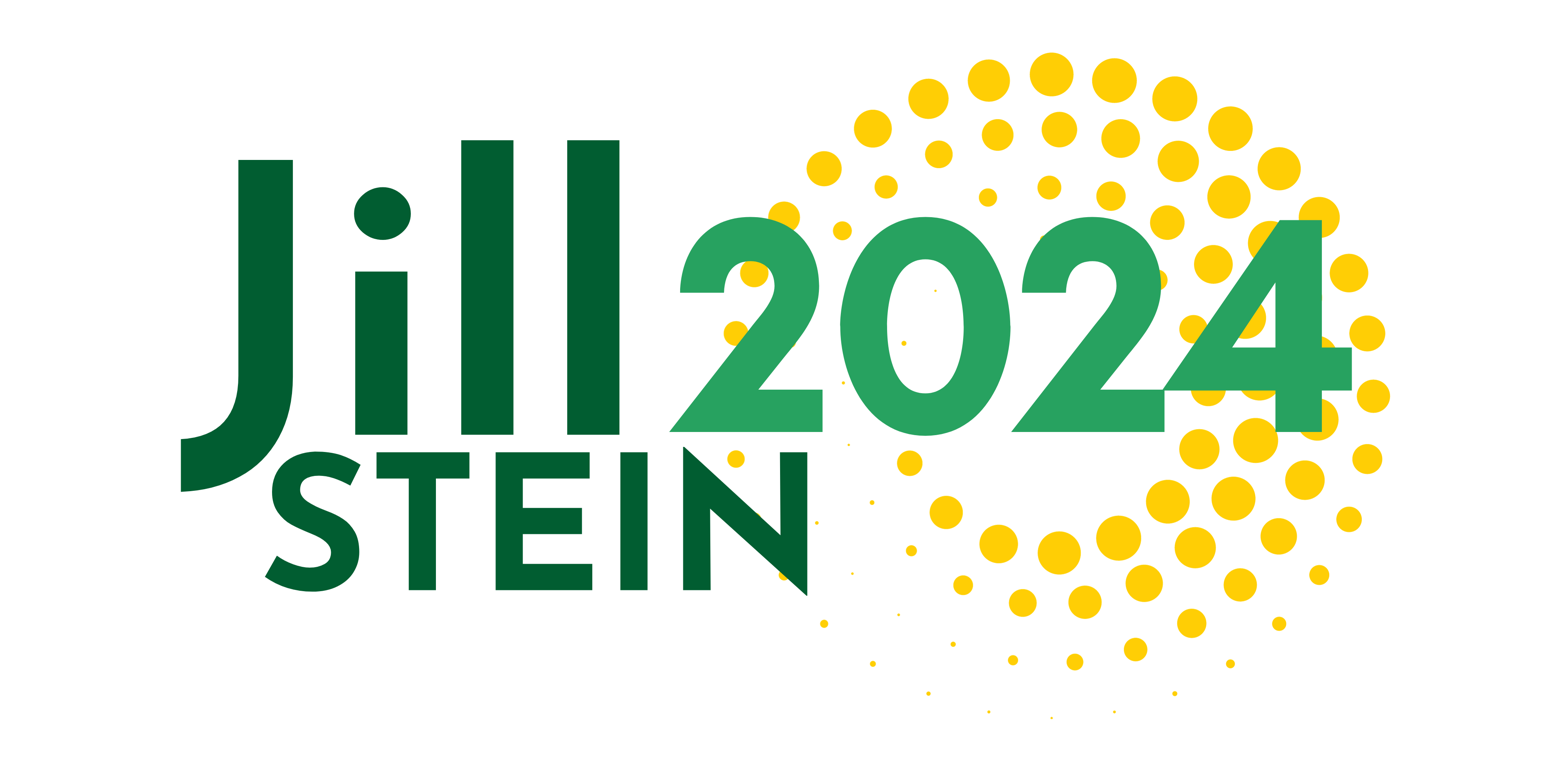
Jill Stein's presidential campaign logo, 2024

Stein originally supported activist and scholar Cornel West's 2024 presidential campaign under the Green Party and became his campaign manager. After West withdrew his bid for the Green presidential nomination in order to instead continue his run for the presidency as an independent, Stein retracted her endorsement for West.

On November 9, 2023, Stein announced her third bid for president.

==== General election ====
The 2024 campaign, like Stein's 2016 campaign, was described by some as a possible spoiler campaign, which could have benefitted Donald Trump. Stein said "Candidates have to earn your vote, they don't own your vote."

In September 2024, Congresswoman Alexandra Ocasio Cortez criticized Stein saying, "'All you do is show up once every four years to speak to people who are justifiably pissed off, but you're just showing up once every four years to do that, you're not serious.'" Stein responded that Green candidates had won "1400 elections" and that the Democratic Party had worked to exclude third-party candidates from ballots and presidential debates. She also criticized AOC for her attempt at entryism into the Democratic Party and backing Kamala Harris despite her position on Israel.

Peter Rothpletz in The New Republic criticized Stein for the decline in Green party membership from 319,000 in 2004 to 234,000 in 2024, and for arguing in a 2016 interview that Hillary Clinton was a greater threat than Donald Trump. Rothpletz also referred to criticism of Stein by members of the Democratic Party that she defended members of the African People's Socialist Party, who were indicted for being part of a "malign influence campaign" on behalf of the Russian government, and that she did not know how many members were in the House of Representatives.

== Political positions ==
=== Economy and infrastructure ===
In 2015, Stein was critical of official employment numbers, saying that unemployment figures were "designed to essentially cover up unemployment," and that the real unemployment rate for that year was around 12–13%.

In her 2024 presidential campaign announcement video, Stein proposed an "economic bill of rights" that regard employment, health care, housing, food and education as rights.

==== Financial reform and banking regulation ====
Stein called the Wall Street bailout wasteful.

During her 2012 and 2016 presidential runs, Stein called for "nationalizing" and "democratiz[ing]" the Federal Reserve, placing it under a Federal Monetary Authority in the Treasury Department and ending its independence.

In 2016, Stein said that she supported a new 0.5% financial transactions tax on the sale of stocks, bonds, and derivatives, and an increase in the estate tax to "at least" 55% on inheritances over $3 million.

She supported the creation of nonprofit publicly owned banks, pledging to create such entities at the federal and state levels.

=== Debt forgiveness ===
Stein favors canceling all student loan debt, saying that it could be done using quantitative easing, similar to the Wall Street bailout, without raising taxes. In this plan, the Federal Reserve could buy up student loans and agree not to collect the debt, thereby effectively canceling it.

=== Electoral reform ===
Stein is critical of the two-party system and argues for ranked-choice voting as an alternative to "lesser evilism".

=== Energy and environment ===
Stein says that climate change is a "national emergency" and calling it "a threat greater than World War II."

Fossil fuels

Stein supports a national ban on fracking on the grounds that "cutting-edge science now suggests fracking is every bit as bad as coal".

Implications

In 2016, Stein has argued that the cost of transitioning to 100% renewable energy by 2030 would in part be recouped by healthcare savings, citing studies that predict 200,000 fewer premature deaths as well as less illness. She has noted that when Cuba lost Soviet oil subsidies it experienced plummeting diabetes (down 50%), CVD (down 30%) and all-cause (down 18%) death rates.

=== Foreign and defense policy ===
At a rally in 2016, she criticized the United States' "expanding wars", saying that the United States had "already" been bombing seven countries.

==== NATO ====
When asked whether the US should withdraw from all of its mutual defense treaties, Stein answered that the treaties need to "be looked at one by one", mentioning NATO in particular.

In 2016, Stein accused NATO member Turkey of supporting Islamic State of Iraq and the Levant, saying that "we need to convince Turkey, our ally in theory, to close its border to the movement of jihadi militias across its border to reinforce ISIS."

==== Middle East ====
On the eve of the 15-year anniversary of the September 11 attacks, Stein called for "a comprehensive and independent inquiry into the attacks," saying that the 9/11 Commission Report contained many "omissions and distortions." The next day, she said: "I think I would not have assassinated Osama bin Laden but would have captured him and brought him to trial."

===== Israel and Palestine =====
Stein has consistently been a vocal advocate for Palestinians. Her 2012 presidential campaign opposed the occupation of the West Bank by Israel and called for a boycott of Israel, which it described as an apartheid state. In 2016, she said the US should stop providing aid to Israel, which she said was committing war crimes and human rights violations.

When asked in September 2016 whether she had a "position on whether a two-state solution is a better solution than a one-state solution", Stein answered by describing limitations of a two-state solution, specifically calling out the geographical fragmentation of Palestine, but that she is "not committing one way or the other at this point."

Stein said that Israel is committing genocide against Palestinians in 2024 during the Gaza war and that both Democrats and Republicans are enabling the genocide by providing military aid to Israel while de-funding the UNRWA.

==== Military spending and weapons use ====
Stein wants to remove U.S. nuclear weapons from foreign countries. Stein has been sharply critical of the use of drones, calling them a human rights violation and an "illegal assassination program" saying that they are "off target nine times out of ten."

According to Stein, the United States should use force only when there is "good evidence that we are under imminent threat of actual attack". When asked by the Los Angeles Times editorial board whether that standard would have prevented US involvement in World War II, Stein answered, "I don't want to revisit history or try to reinterpret it, you know, but starting from where we are now, given the experience that we've had in the last, you know, since 2001, which has been an utter disaster, I don't think it's benefited us." Stein criticized the 2003 invasion of Iraq, U.S.-led War in Afghanistan and U.S. involvement in the Saudi Arabian-led intervention in Yemen, stating: "We are party to the war crimes that are being committed by Saudi Arabia, who's using cluster bombs made by us. And we've supplied $100 billion worth of weapons to the Saudis in the last decade...It's against our own laws. The Leahy bill requires that we not sell weapons to human rights abusers."

==== Russo-Ukrainian War ====
In October 2016, Stein characterized the conflict as "the Cuban Missile Crisis in reverse, on steroids". She said that Russia had been "surrounded" with NATO assets.

In a 2024 interview by Mehdi Hasan, Stein was asked whether she considers Vladimir Putin a "war criminal who should be on trial". Hasan juxtaposed her past remarks regarding Putin, Bashar al-Assad and Benjamin Netanyahu, repeatedly asking Stein why there had been no remarks from her characterizing Putin or Assad as a war criminal. She referred to John F. Kennedy, responding, "if you want to be an effective world leader, you don't start by name-calling and hurling epithets." She then claimed that there had been no decision by the International Criminal Court regarding Putin. Three days later in response to the interview, Stein's Twitter account posted a statement describing Putin as a war criminal.

==== Other views ====
Brexit

Immediately after the UK voted to leave the European Union in June 2016, Stein came out in support of Brexit. Stein posted a celebratory statement on her website, saying the vote was "a victory for those who believe in the right of self-determination and who reject the pro-corporate, austerity policies of the political elites in the EU ... [and] a rejection of the European political elite and their contempt for ordinary people." She later changed the statement (without indicating so), removing words like "victory" and adding the line, "Before the Brexit vote I agreed with Jeremy Corbyn, Caroline Lucas and the UK Greens who supported staying in the EU but working to fix it."

GMOs and pesticides

Stein supports GMO labeling, a moratorium on new GMOs, and the phasing out of existing GMO foods, unless independent research "shows decisively that GMOs are not harmful to human health or ecosystems". Speaking of the health effects of foods derived from GM crops, she has said: "And I can tell you as a physician with special interest and long history in environmental health, the quality of studies that we have are not what you need. We should have a moratorium until they are proven safe, and they have not been proven safe in the way that they are used."

Commentators have criticized Stein's statements about GMOs, writing that they contradict the scientific consensus, which is that existing GM foods are no less safe than foods made from conventional crops. Among the critics was Jordan Weissmann, Slate's business and economics editor, who wrote in July 2016: "Never mind that scientists have studied GMOs extensively and found no signs of danger to human health—Stein would like medical researchers to prove a negative."

Vaccinations and regulations

In response to a Twitter question about whether vaccines cause autism, Stein first answered, "there is no evidence that autism is caused by vaccines," then revised her tweet to "I'm not aware of evidence linking autism with vaccines."

Dan Kahan, a professor at Yale who has studied public perception of science, says that it is dangerous for candidates to equivocate on vaccines, "Because the attitudes about vaccines are pretty much uniform across the political spectrum, it doesn't seem like a great idea for any candidate to be anti-vaccine. The modal view is leave the freaking system alone." Emily Willingham, scientist and contributor at Forbes, described Stein's statements on vaccines as "using dog whistle terms and equivocations bound to appeal to the 'antivaccine' constituency".

In an interview with The Washington Post, Stein stated that "vaccines have been absolutely critical in ridding us of the scourge of many diseases," and said that "[t]here were concerns among physicians about what the vaccination schedule meant, the toxic substances like mercury which used to be rampant in vaccines. There were real questions that needed to be addressed. I think some of them at least have been addressed. I don't know if all of them have been addressed."

In July 2018 Washington Post interview, Stein said that vaccines should be approved by a board that people can trust, and "people do not trust a Food and Drug Administration," or Centers for Disease Control and Prevention, "where corporate influence and the pharmaceutical industry has a lot of influence." According to The Guardian, eleven members of the Vaccines and Related Biological Products Advisory Committee are medical doctors who work at hospitals and universities, and two work at pharmaceutical companies, GlaxoSmithKline and Sanofi Pasteur US. In response, Stein said that "Monsanto lobbyists help run the day in those agencies and are in charge of approving what food isn't safe".

=== Race relations ===
Black Americans

Stein has deplored what she and others identify as the structural racism of the U.S. judicial and prison system. On Juneteenth in 2016, Stein called for reparations for slavery.

Native Americans

Stein has supported the Great Sioux Nation's opposition to the Dakota Access Pipeline, and in September 2016 joined protesters in North Dakota. In 2016, both Stein and her running mate, Ajamu Baraka, faced misdemeanor criminal charges for spray-painting bulldozers at the construction site of the pipeline with "I approve this message" and "decolonization" respectively.

== Electoral history ==
=== 2004 9th Middlesex District ===
In 2004, Stein ran for state representative for the 9th Middlesex District, which included portions of Waltham and Lexington. She received 3,911 votes (21.3%) in a three-way race, ahead of the Republican candidate but far behind Democratic incumbent Thomas M. Stanley.

=== 2005 Lexington Town Meeting ===
In 2005, Stein set her sights locally, running for the Lexington Town Meeting, a representative town meeting, the local legislative body in Lexington, Massachusetts. Stein was elected to one of seven seats in Precinct 2. She finished first of 16 candidates, receiving 539 votes (20.6%). Stein was reelected in 2008, finishing second of 13 vying for eight seats. Stein resigned during her second term to again run for governor.

=== 2002 Governor of Massachusetts ===
Stein ran as the Green-Rainbow Party candidate in the 2002 Massachusetts gubernatorial election with Tony Lorenzen as running mate. She obtained 76,530 votes (3.5%).

Massachusetts gubernatorial election, 2002
Party	Candidate	Votes	%	±%
Republican	Mitt Romney	1,091,988	49.18%	▼0.8%
Democratic	Shannon O'Brien	985,981	44.40%	▼2.2%
Green-Rainbow	Jill Stein	76,530	3.44%	▲3.44
Libertarian	Carla Howell	23,044	1.04%	▼0.64
Independent	Barbara Johnson	15,335	0.69%	▲0.70
Write-in		1,301	0.07%	▼0.05
Blank		26,122	1.17%	
Total votes		2,220,301	100.00	+ 4.04

=== 2006 Secretary of the Commonwealth ===
At the Green-Rainbow Party state convention on March 4, 2006, Stein was nominated for Secretary of the Commonwealth. In a two-way race with the three-term incumbent, Democrat Bill Galvin, she received 353,551 votes (17.7%).

Secretary of the Commonwealth election, 2006
Party	Candidate	Votes	%	±%
Democratic	William Francis Galvin	1,638,594	82.0%	
Green	Jill Stein	353,551	17.7%	
Total votes		2,243,835	100.00	

=== 2010 Governor of Massachusetts ===
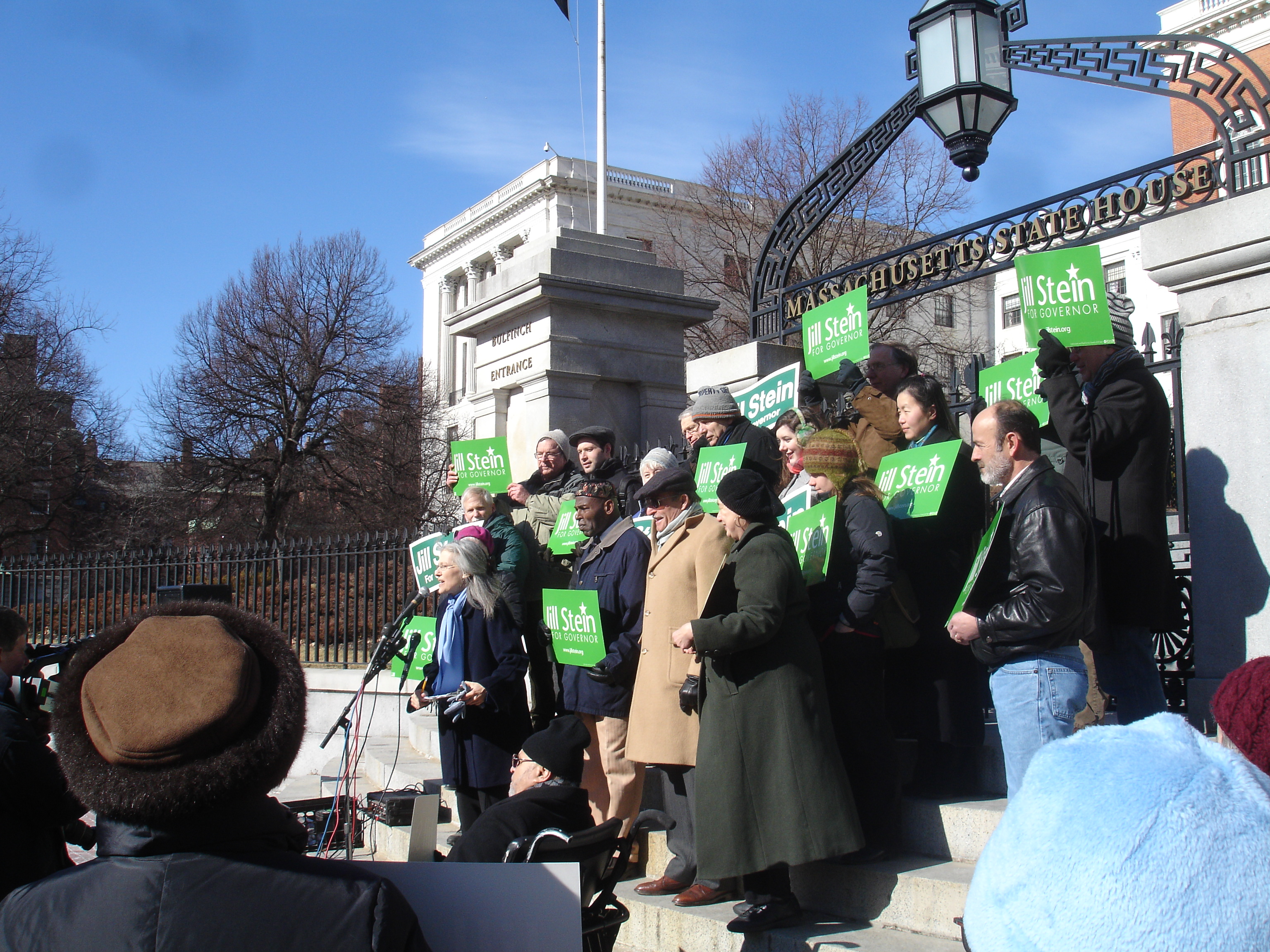
Jill Stein announcing her candidacy for governor in February 2010, standing in front of the Massachusetts State House

On February 8, 2010, Stein announced her second candidacy for governor. Her running mate was Richard P. Purcell, a surgery clerk and ergonomics assessor. In the November 2 general election, Stein finished fourth, receiving 32,895 votes (1.4%), again far behind the incumbent, Democrat Deval Patrick.

Massachusetts gubernatorial election, 2010
Party	Candidate	Votes	%	±%
Democratic	Deval Patrick (incumbent)	1,112,283	48.42	▼7.21
Republican	Charlie Baker	964,866	42.00	▲6.67
Independent	Tim Cahill	184,395	8.03	▲1.06
Green-Rainbow	Jill Stein	32,895	1.43	▼0.51
Write-in	All others	2,600	0.11	▼0.01
Total votes		2,297,039		

=== 2012 President of the United States ===
Stein received 469,015 votes (0.36%), the largest number of votes any woman presidential candidate had received up to that point. She received 1% or more of the vote in three states: Maine (1.1%), Oregon (1.1%), and Alaska (1.0%).

2012 United States presidential election
Party	Candidate	Votes	%
Democratic	Barack Obama / Joe Biden (inc.)	65,915,795	51.1%
Republican	Mitt Romney / Paul Ryan	60,933,504	47.2%
Libertarian	Gary Johnson / Jim Gray	1,275,971	1.0%
Green	Jill Stein / Cheri Honkala	469,627	0.4%
Constitution	Virgil Goode / James Clymer	122,389	0.1%
Peace and Freedom	Roseanne Barr / Cindy Sheehan	67,326	0.1%
Justice	Rocky Anderson / Luis J. Rodriguez	43,018	nil
American Independent	Tom Hoefling / J.D. Ellis	40,628	nil
Reform	Andre Barnett / Kenneth Cross	956	nil
N/A	Other	216,196	0.2%
Total votes		129,085,410	100%

=== 2016 President of the United States ===
Stein received 1% of the national popular vote in the election. She finished in 4th place with over 1,457,216 votes (more than the previous three Green tickets combined) and 1.07% of the popular vote.

2016 United States presidential election
Party	Candidate	Popular votes	%	Electoral votes
Republican	Donald Trump / Mike Pence	62,985,828	46.09%	304
Democratic	Hillary Clinton / Tim Kaine	65,853,514	48.18%	227
Libertarian	Gary Johnson / Bill Weld	4,489,233	3.28%	0
Green	Jill Stein / Ajamu Baraka	1,457,222	1.07%	0
Independent	Evan McMullin / Mindy Finn	731,788	0.54%	0
Others		1,152,671	0.84%	0
Total		136,669,237	100%	538

=== 2024 President of the United States ===
2024 United States presidential election
Party	Candidate	Popular votes	%	Electoral votes
Republican	Donald Trump / JD Vance	77,302,580	49.80	312
Democratic	Kamala Harris / Tim Walz	75,017,613	48.32	226
Green	Jill Stein / Butch Ware	862,049	0.56	0
Independent	Robert Kennedy Jr. / Nicole Shanahan	756,393	0.49	0
Others		649,541	0.42	0
Total		155,238,302	100	

== Personal life ==
Stein is married to Richard Rohrer, who is also a physician. They live in Lexington, Massachusetts, and have two sons.

In the 1990s, Stein sang in a folk rock duo called Somebody's Sister, alongside Ken Selcer. They released three albums: Somebody's Sister in 1995, Green Skies in 1997 and Circuits to the Sun in 1999.

Party political offices
Preceded by Cynthia McKinney	Green nominee for President of the United States; 2012, 2016	Succeeded by Howie Hawkins
Preceded by Howie Hawkins	Green nominee for President of the United States; 2024	Most recent
