= Joe Andrew =

American politician and lawyer

National Chair of the Democratic National Committee
- In office January 22, 1999 – January 21, 2001 Serving with Ed Rendell (General Chair)
- Preceded by: Steve Grossman
- Succeeded by: Terry McAuliffe (Chair)

Chair of the Indiana Democratic Party
- In office 1995–1999
- Preceded by: Ann DeLaney
- Succeeded by: Robin Winston

Personal details
- Born: March 1, 1960 (age 66)
- Party: Democratic
- Spouse: Anne Slaughter
- Children: 2
- Education: Yale University (BA, JD)

Joseph Jerry Andrew (born March 1, 1960) is an American politician and lawyer. He was national chairman of the Democratic National Committee (DNC) from 1999 to 2001. He previously served as chairman of the Indiana Democratic Party from 1995 to 1999. He served with DNC General Chairman Ed Rendell. Asked to serve by President Bill Clinton, Andrew became, at the age of 39, one of the youngest chairpersons in the history of the DNC. He later served as chairman of the New Democratic Network, and in 2006 helped to found The Blue Fund, a mutual fund which invests in companies that contribute to Democratic campaigns.

Andrew was considered to be a candidate for Governor of Indiana in 2004, but he decided against it after Joe Kernan announced that he would run. During the 2008 Democratic presidential nominating contest he was one of the first to endorse Senator Hillary Clinton in November 2007. However, on May 1, 2008, he switched his endorsement to Senator Barack Obama.

== Early life and education ==
Andrew is a native of Fort Wayne, Indiana. His father was a doctor and his mother was a school teacher and entrepreneur. He graduated from Yale University in 1982 and Yale Law School in 1985. While at Yale, he served as editor-in-chief of the Yale University Literary Review, today known as The Yale Review. Shortly after law school, he began his career in politics working on Democratic campaigns. He worked as the campaign manager for attorney Jack Wickes during the 1988 United States Senate election in Indiana. He also served as campaign advisor to Secretary of State of Indiana Joseph H. Hogsett, whose term was from 1989 to 1994.

== Personal life ==
Andrew is married to former US Ambassador Anne Slaughter Andrew, with whom he has two children.

== Political career ==
Andrew was national chairman of the Democratic National Committee (DNC) from 1999 to 2001. He previously served as chairman of the Indiana Democratic Party from 1995 to 1999. He served with DNC General Chairman Ed Rendell. Asked to serve by President Bill Clinton, Andrew became, at the age of 39, one of the youngest chairpersons in the history of the DNC. He later served as chairman of the New Democratic Network, and in 2006 helped to found The Blue Fund, a mutual fund which invests in companies that contribute to Democratic campaigns.

Andrew was considered to be a candidate for Governor of Indiana in 2004, but he decided against it after Joe Kernan announced that he would run. During the 2008 Democratic presidential nominating contest he was one of the first to endorse Senator Hillary Clinton in November 2007. However, on May 1, 2008, he switched his endorsement to Senator Barack Obama.

== Current career ==
Andrew is an accomplished and highly regarded corporate lawyer. In 2004, he joined Sonnenschein Nath & Rosenthal, where he was involved in negotiating deals worth in excess of US$500 billion, including numerous Fortune 500 mergers in the health care and insurance areas.

Andrew has counseled companies worldwide on their corporate and policy strategies in a variety of industries, ranging from technology companies to regulated companies in the insurance, energy, life sciences, banking and telecommunications fields, to foreign acquirers and heads of state. He also advises corporations on issues arising from Capitol Hill, the White House and administrative agencies, and on policy matters in the 50 states.

In 2012, Joseph Andrew and Elliott Portnoy created Dentons, one of the world's largest law firms. Their vision was to become more than a traditional law firm. Recognizing the ever-changing needs of clients which go beyond the scope of traditional legal advice and realizing Dentons’ long-held strategy to be more than a traditional law firm, Dentons launched Dentons Global Advisors (DGA) in 2021, a multidisciplinary advisory firm that provides integrated strategic counsel for clients facing complex opportunities and challenges spanning commercial, reputational, financial, regulatory and governance dimensions. Dentons Global Advisors was launched with founding member Albright Stonebridge Group along with a team of advisory industry leaders, including Ed Reilly, Chief Executive Officer. A few weeks later, Dentons Global Advisors announced the acquisition of Interel, an award-winning pan-European public affairs consultancy which extended DGA's footprint in Europe, and further strengthened the firm's public affairs capabilities alongside Dentons Global Advisors Albright Stonebridge Group and deepened the pool of expertise upon which clients can draw.

== Author ==
Andrew is the author of The Disciples, a spy thriller, published by Simon and Schuster.

== See also ==
- Majority Action, a 2005 issue-advocacy organization

Party political offices
Preceded by Ann DeLaney	Chair of the Indiana Democratic Party; 1995–1999	Succeeded by Robin Winston
Preceded by Steve Grossman	National Chair of the Democratic National Committee; 1999–2001; Served alongside: Ed Rendell (General Chair)	Succeeded by Terry McAuliffe as Chair of the Democratic National Committee
