= Majority Action =

Majority Action is an American issue-advocacy organization founded in 2005 under tax code 527 (c)(3). During the 2006 election cycle, they concentrated on helping Democrats take control of the U.S. House of Representatives and ran ads against Republicans. During the 2008 cycle, they focused on Senate races. They were involved in the North Carolina and Idaho senate races. Their efforts against Senator Elizabeth Dole may have contributed to her defeat in the 2008 election. Leaders include Joe Andrew and Donald Fowler.
