= Bulls, Bears and the Ballot Box =

Book by Bob Deitrick

Bulls Bears and the Ballot Box
- First edition
- Author: Bob Deitrick and Lew Goldfarb
- Language: English
- Subject: Economics, U.S. Presidents
- Genre: Political Science
- Publisher: Advantage Media Group
- Publication date: July 1, 2012
- Media type: Print
- Pages: 266 pages
- ISBN: 978-1-59932-288-9

Bulls Bears and the Ballot Box is a 2012 non-fiction book by the American writers Bob Deitrick and Lew Goldfarb. The book was first released on July 1, 2012 through Advantage Media Group and presents a study of the presidents of the United States from the years 1929 to 2009.

== Synopsis ==
In the book Deitrick and Goldfarb rank the United States Presidents from 1929 (Herbert Hoover era) through 2009 (the Presidency of George W. Bush). The Presidents are ranked based upon the authors' ranking system, the Presidential Rankings of Economic Stewardship (PRES Rules). These rules are a series of customized rankings which were predetermined by the authors to chart the influence of a given president on the American economy. The authors looked at 12 economic factors such as "the deficit, months in recession and stock market performance" when ranking the Presidents.

== Reception ==
The International Business Times noted that the book's contents "may surprise some partisans, and challenge classic Red vs. Blue orthodoxy." The Herald commented that much of the book's findings were favorable towards Democrats rather than Republicans, which they found interesting.
