= 2002 Massachusetts Question 2 =

Question 2
- Massachusetts English Language Education in Public Schools Initiative

Results
Choice	Votes	%
Yes	1,359,935	67.98%
No	640,525	32.02%
Valid votes	2,000,460	100.00%
Invalid or blank votes	0	0.00%
Total votes	2,000,460	100.00%

Yes
90–100%
80–90%
70–80%
60–70%
50–60%
No
90–100%
80–90%
70–80%
60–70%
50–60%
Other
Tie

The Massachusetts English Language Education in Public Schools Initiative, Question 2 was a successful initiative voted on in the Massachusetts general election held on November 5, 2002. It was one of three 2002 ballot measures put to public vote, and the only one to pass.

The initiative was reportedly financed by Silicon Valley multimillionaire Ron Unz, while it was opposed by the Massachusetts legislature’s Joint Committee on Education, Arts and Humanities.

== Voting ==
Question 2 on the ballot, "English Language Education in Public Schools".

A YES VOTE would require that, with limited exceptions, all public school children must be taught English by being taught all subjects in English and being placed in English language classrooms.

A NO VOTE would make no changes in English language education in public schools.

Response	Votes	%
Yes	1,359,935	61.25%
No	640,525	28.85%
blank	219,841	9.90%
