= Debra DeLee =

American politician

Chair of the Democratic National Committee
- In office November 11, 1994 – January 21, 1995
- Preceded by: David Wilhelm
- Succeeded by: Chris Dodd (General Chair); Donald Fowler (National Chair)

Personal details
- Born: February 9, 1948 (age 78) Chicago, Illinois, U.S.
- Party: Democratic
- Education: University of Wisconsin, Madison (BA)

Debra DeLee (born 1948) was chair of the Democratic National Committee from 1994 to 1995, the second woman to hold the post. She also was CEO of the Democratic National Committee.

She is president and CEO of Americans for Peace Now (APN), a national Zionist organization dedicated to enhancing Israel's security through peace and to supporting the Israeli Peace Now movement.

She was born in Chicago, Illinois, is a graduate of the University of Wisconsin, Madison. She was a superdelegate for the 2008 Democratic National Convention and endorsed United States Senator Hillary Clinton of New York in the primaries.

Party political offices
Preceded by David Wilhelm	Chair of the Democratic National Committee; 1994–1995	Succeeded by Chris Dodd as General Chair of the Democratic National Committee
Preceded by David Wilhelm	Chair of the Democratic National Committee; 1994–1995	Succeeded by Donald Fowler as National Chair of the Democratic National Committee
