= Homar Gomez =

American politician

Member of the Massachusetts House of Representatives from the 2nd Hampshire district
- Incumbent
- Assumed office January 1, 2025
- Preceded by: Daniel R. Carey

Personal details
- Born: Puerto Rico
- Party: Democratic
- Website: Campaign website

Homar Gomez is an American politician. He was elected to the Massachusetts House of Representatives in 2024. He was President of Easthampton City Council.

== Committee Assignments ==
For the 2025-26 Session, Gomez sits on the following committees in the House:

- Joint Committee on Agriculture and Fisheries
- Joint Committee on Municipalities and Regional Government
- Joint Committee on Public Safety and Homeland Security
- Joint Committee on Revenue
