= Disciples of Christ (disambiguation) =

In ancient contexts, Disciples of Christ may refer to:

- Disciple (Christianity), a common word for people who followed Jesus Christ during his lifetime, particularly the Twelve Disciples or the Seventy Disciples

In modern contexts, Disciples of Christ may refer to:

- Christian Church (Disciples of Christ), a current mainline Protestant denomination in North America that is descended from the Campbell movement often referred to as "Disciples of Christ"
- Disciples of Christ (Campbell Movement), a Christian group that arose during the Second Great Awakening of the early 19th century and later became part of the Restoration Movement
- Disciples of Christ (hip hop group), a Christian rap group
- Disciple of Christ (abbreviated as D.Ch.), title awarded by West Kalimantan Christian Church for those who have completed courses of the church discipleship program

== See also ==
- Disciple (disambiguation)
