= Steven Grossman (politician) =

American politician (born 1946)

Steve Grossman
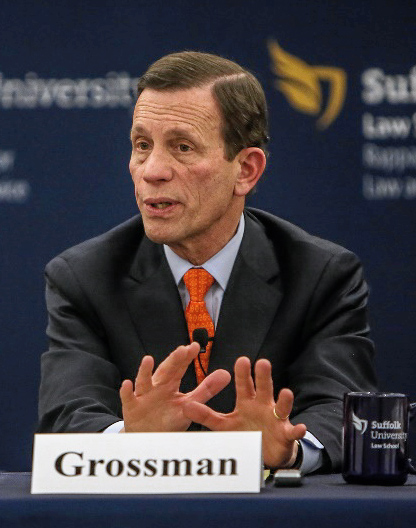
- Grossman in 2014

57th Treasurer and Receiver-General of Massachusetts
- In office January 17, 2011 – January 21, 2015
- Governor: Deval Patrick
- Preceded by: Tim Cahill
- Succeeded by: Deb Goldberg

National Chair of the Democratic National Committee
- In office January 21, 1997 – January 22, 1999 Serving with Roy Romer (General Chair)
- Preceded by: Donald Fowler
- Succeeded by: Joe Andrew

Chair of the Massachusetts Democratic Party
- In office 1991–1993
- Preceded by: Chester Atkins
- Succeeded by: Joan Menard

Personal details
- Born: February 17, 1946 (age 80) Newton, Massachusetts, U.S.
- Party: Democratic
- Spouse: Barbara Wallace
- Children: 3
- Education: Princeton University (BA); Harvard University (MBA)

Steven Grossman (born February 17, 1946) is an American businessman and former Treasurer and Receiver-General of Massachusetts and candidate for Governor of Massachusetts. Grossman previously served as chairman of the Massachusetts Democratic Party from 1991 to 1992, president of the American Israel Public Affairs Committee (AIPAC) from 1992 to 1996 and chairman of the Democratic National Committee from 1997 to 1999. In the spring of 2015, Grossman became the CEO of the Initiative for a Competitive Inner City, a Boston-based nonprofit focused on strengthening inner city economies that was founded by Harvard Business School professor Michael Porter.

Prior to his involvement in politics, Grossman worked at Goldman Sachs. In 1975 he left Goldman Sachs to work in his family business, a paper supplier called Massachusetts Envelope Company, now the Grossman Marketing Group.

In 2012 Grossman was named number 47 on a list of the 100 most influential institutional investors worldwide by the Asset International magazine.

== Education and military service ==
Grossman received his bachelor's degree in Romance languages from Princeton University in 1967, and his Master of Business Administration degree from Harvard Business School in 1969, where he was a Baker Scholar.

He served in the Army Reserve during the 1970s, and his South Boston unit numbered among its members Thomas P. O'Neill III, Ed Markey, and Markey's brothers Richard and John.

== Political career ==
From 1991 to 1992, he was chairman of the Massachusetts Democratic Party, also serving as chairman of the American Israel Public Affairs Committee from 1992 to 1996. From 1997 to 1999, he was the chairman of the Democratic National Committee.

He ran unsuccessfully for Governor of Massachusetts in 2002, losing the Democratic nomination to Shannon O'Brien with 0.80% of the vote in the Democratic Primary. He had announced his withdrawal from the race over the summer, but too late to remove his name from the ballot.

He was elected to succeed Tim Cahill as state treasurer in November 2010, defeating Republican State Representative Karyn Polito.

=== 2014 gubernatorial campaign ===
On July 13, 2013, Grossman declared his candidacy for Massachusetts Governor.

On April 17, 2014, Grossman faced off against Gun Owners' Action League of Massachusetts Executive Director Jim Wallace in a debate over tougher gun control laws.

On June 14, 2014, Grossman won the endorsement of the Massachusetts Democratic Party at the Democratic State Convention in Worcester, Massachusetts, where he received the most support by a wide margin.

Grossman received strong support from the LGBT community during his campaign, including the endorsement of all five LGBT state legislators: State Senator and Majority Leader Stan Rosenberg, Representative Denise Andrews, Representative Elizabeth Malia, Representative Kate Hogan, and Representative Sarah Peake. Grossman's broad base of support included endorsements by unions such as the United Union of Roofers, Waterproofers and Allied Workers Local 33 and Teamsters Local 122 as well as advocacy organizations such as Mass Retirees and the Coalition for Social Justice.

During the campaign Grossman also received support from the Mass Forward Super PAC, which became the first Super PAC subject to a new state campaign finance disclosure law that requires the top five donors names be included on advertising materials. In the disclosure, Grossman's mother, Shirley Grossman's name appeared as one of those donors.

On September 9, 2014, Grossman lost his gubernatorial bid in the Democratic primary to Martha Coakley.

Grossman was a supporter of Mayor Pete Buttigieg's 2020 presidential campaign.

== Personal life ==
He is married to Barbara Wallace Grossman a professor of theater at Tufts University, and they have three children. His daughter-in-law is a city councilor for Newton, Massachusetts, and placed third in the Democratic primary race to succeed Rep. Joe Kennedy III.

Party political offices
Preceded by Chester Atkins	Chair of the Massachusetts Democratic Party; 1991–1992	Succeeded by Joan Menard
Preceded by Donald Fowler	National Chair of the Democratic National Committee; 1997–1999; Served alongside: Roy Romer (General Chair)	Succeeded by Joe Andrew
Preceded by Tim Cahill	Democratic nominee for Treasurer and Receiver-General of Massachusetts; 2010	Succeeded by Deb Goldberg
Political offices
Preceded by Tim Cahill	Treasurer and Receiver-General of Massachusetts; 2011–2015	Succeeded by Deb Goldberg
