= Shannon O'Brien (Massachusetts politician) =

American politician

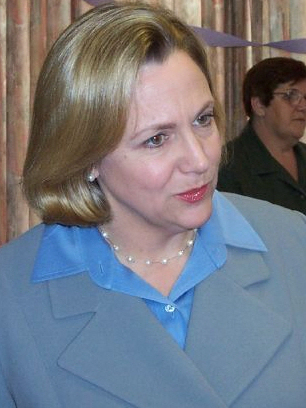
- O'Brien in 2002

55th Treasurer and Receiver-General of Massachusetts
- In office January 7, 1999 – January 2, 2003
- Governor: Paul Cellucci; Jane Swift (acting)
- Preceded by: Joe Malone
- Succeeded by: Tim Cahill

Member of the Massachusetts Senate from the Hampden and Hampshire district
- In office January 6, 1993 – January 4, 1995
- Preceded by: Martin Dunn
- Succeeded by: Brian Lees

Member of the Massachusetts House of Representatives from the 2nd Hampshire district
- In office January 7, 1987 – January 6, 1993
- Preceded by: William A. Carey
- Succeeded by: Nancy Flavin

Personal details
- Born: April 30, 1959 (age 67) Boston, Massachusetts, U.S.
- Party: Democratic
- Spouse: Emmet Hayes
- Education: Yale University (BA); Boston University (JD)

Shannon Patricia Elizabeth O'Brien (born April 30, 1959) is an American politician and attorney who served in the Massachusetts House of Representatives from 1987 through 1993, in the Massachusetts Senate from 1993 through 1995, and was the Massachusetts state treasurer from 1999 through 2003. In that last position she became the first woman to be elected in Massachusetts to statewide office by her own accord. She was the Democratic Party nominee in the 2002 Massachusetts gubernatorial election, but lost in the general election to Mitt Romney.

== Early life and education ==
Four generations of O'Brien's family have served in elected office in Massachusetts government. Her great-grandfather, Michael T. O'Brien, was the proprietor of the family funeral home in Easthampton, Massachusetts, and first elected to the state legislature in 1930. Her father, Edward O'Brien (1933–2004), was a lawyer who served on the Massachusetts Governor's Council from 1970 to 1975 and left the post to run for Massachusetts attorney general, losing the 1974 Democratic primary to Francis X. Belotti. He then ran for Congress in 1976, losing to the incumbent Silvio Conte; he returned to the Governor's Council after the 1978 election and remained in office until his death in 2004. Shannon's mother is named Ann. Shannon has four siblings: Erin, a clerk at the West Roxbury District Court; Gaelan, a court officer in the Northampton District Court; Tara, a former employee at Boston City Hall; and Michael, who runs the family funeral home in Easthampton.

O'Brien was born in Boston, Massachusetts. She graduated from Yale University in 1981, where she was captain of the Yale Bulldogs varsity women's soccer team. She received her Juris Doctor degree from the Boston University School of Law in 1985.

== Career ==
=== Politics ===
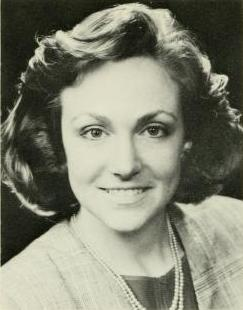
O'Brien as a State Representative in 1987

O'Brien worked for a large Boston law firm before her father alerted her to an open seat in the state legislature, which she won. O'Brien served in the Massachusetts House of Representatives from 1987 through 1993, and in the Massachusetts Senate from 1993 through 1995. While a state legislator she authored a law that increased penalties for crimes against children such as abuse and neglect.

She was the Massachusetts state treasurer from 1999 through 2003, winning the office in the Massachusetts general election, 1998, after losing in her first attempt for that office in Massachusetts general election, 1994 and subsequently working as a vice president for external affairs at a health-care company. She was the first woman to be elected in Massachusetts to statewide office by her own accord. She came into the office after it had suffered a major embezzlement scandal, and she tightened controls over the funds involved. While serving as State Treasurer, she restructured the lottery commission and the Abandoned Properties Division in Massachusetts, gaining acclaim for returning dormant funds to the residents of the state. She also refinanced state debt and in doing so saved about $500 million. In dealing with the near-infamous Big Dig project in Boston, which became the most expensive highway project in U.S. history, she forced public disclosure of a $2 billion cost overrun.

She won the Democratic gubernatorial primary in 2002, defeating State Senate President Thomas Birmingham, former Democratic National Committee and American Israel Public Affairs Committee chair Steven Grossman, former United States Secretary of Labor Robert Reich, and former nominee for lieutenant governor Warren Tolman. In this action she became the first woman to win a major party nomination for governor in the Commonwealth. In the general election she garnered 45 percent of the vote to Mitt Romney's 50 percent.

=== Later career ===
Following her defeat in 2002, O'Brien joined Boston-area local television station WLVI as a consumer advocate. She left the station in 2005 to head the Boston Area Girl Scouts, and as such is the CEO of the Patriot's Trail Girl Scout Council covering Greater Boston.

In January 2014 OIKOS Software appointed O'Brien to its board of directors.

In August 2022, State Treasurer and Receiver General Deb Goldberg appointed O'Brien as Chair of the Cannabis Control Commission. Goldberg suspended O'Brien from the position on September 15, 2023. She was fired a year later after Goldberg found credible allegations of racial insensitivity and bullying. On September 2, 2025, Judge Robert Gordon of the Suffolk County Superior Court ruled that Goldberg's decision failed to meet the "high bar for removal" and ordered that O'Brien be reinstated with back pay.

== Personal life ==
O'Brien lives in Massachusetts with her husband, former state representative Emmet Hayes, and children.

== Electoral history ==
- 2002 election for Governor
  - Mitt Romney (R), 49.8%
  - Shannon O'Brien (D), 44.9%
  - Jill Stein (G), 3.5%
  - Carla Howell (L), 1.1%
  - Barbara Johnson (I), 0.7%

Political offices
Preceded by Joe Malone	Treasurer and Receiver-General of Massachusetts; 1999–2003	Succeeded by Tim Cahill
Party political offices
Preceded by William F. Galvin	Democratic nominee for Treasurer and Receiver-General of Massachusetts; 1994, 1998	Succeeded by Tim Cahill
Preceded by Scott Harshbarger	Democratic nominee for Governor of Massachusetts; 2002	Succeeded by Deval Patrick
