= The Disciples (novel) =

1993 novel by Joe Andrew

- Author: Joe Andrew
- Language: English
- Genre: Spy thriller, Fiction
- Published: 6 July 1993 Simon & Schuster (US)
- Publication place: United States
- Media type: Print (Hardback)
- Pages: 432 p
- ISBN: 978-0-671-79599-3 (US)

The Disciples is a 1993 spy thriller by Joe Andrew, who was chairman of the 2000 Democratic National Convention.

== Reception ==
Critical reception for The Disciples was mixed. Kirkus Reviews called the book "An engrossing thriller--and first novel--that displays a firm grasp of conspiracy theory". Publishers Weekly wrote that although the book had "a few good twists and a clean prose style", it had "little here to recommend".
