= David Wilhelm =

American entrepreneur and political operative

Chair of the Democratic National Committee
- In office January 21, 1993 – November 11, 1994
- Preceded by: Ron Brown
- Succeeded by: Debra DeLee

Personal details
- Born: October 2, 1956 (age 69) Champaign, Illinois, U.S.
- Party: Democratic
- Education: Ohio University (BA); Harvard University (MPP)

David Wilhelm (born October 2, 1956) is an entrepreneur, renewable energy developer, and former chair of the Democratic National Committee. He is co-founder and chair of HGR Energy, which develops solar and battery storage projects in Africa, and former chief strategy officer at Hecate Energy, which focuses on the U.S. He also founded venture capital funds targeting Appalachia and the Midwest, aiming to direct capital to regions that have received little investment compared to the East and West Coasts of the U.S.

Wilhelm became DNC chair after managing Bill Clinton's successful 1991-92 presidential campaign. At 36, he was the youngest person in history to assume that position. He previously ran several successful campaigns in Illinois, including the first election of U.S. Senator Paul Simon in 1984. He also served as executive director of Citizens for Tax Justice.

== Early life ==
David Wilhelm was born on October 2, 1956, in Champaign, Illinois, to Hubert and Constance Wilhelm. Hubert came to the U.S. as a German refugee after World War II, sponsored by a Brethren Church farm family near Auburn, Illinois. Hubert became a geography professor at the University of Ohio in Athens, where Wilhelm and his two sisters were raised.

Wilhelm began political organizing at a young age. In sixth grade, he led his fellow Safety Patrol workers on a strike because they were forced to stay twenty minutes after the last student had left school. At sixteen, he helped manage the successful campaign of his social studies teacher, Peter Lalich, for a seat on Athens City Council.

Wilhelm received a BA in government from Ohio University and a master's in public policy from the Harvard Kennedy School of Government. At 19, he was the first Ohio staffer hired by the Jimmy Carter presidential campaign, for which he recruited a full slate of delegates and alternates in the Democratic primary; most of Carter's primary opponents failed to do the same.

== Politics ==
Wilhelm managed Bill Clinton's 1991-1992 presidential campaign, overseeing day-to-day operations, directing Electoral College strategy, and initiating and planning the post-convention bus tour of the American heartland. Wilhelm had previously managed the 1984 U.S. Senate campaign of Paul Simon, who ran as a reformer and was seen as an underdog candidate, as well as Chicago mayoral campaigns of Richard M. Daley and the 1988 Iowa caucus campaign of presidential candidate Joe Biden.

Upon his election in 1992, President Clinton named Wilhelm to serve as chair of the Democratic National Committee, making Wilhelm, 36, the youngest person ever to serve in that role in either political party. As chair, Wilhelm re-established the labor advisory council and rebuked the conservative Christian Coalition of America at its 1993 convention for weaponizing faith for partisan purposes. The DNC also worked in support of Clinton's 1993 budget proposal, which passed the House of Representatives by a single vote and was signed into law by Clinton.

Wilhelm was instrumental in securing Chicago as the host city of the 1996 Democratic National Convention. He is a lifetime superdelegate and chaired the bid of Columbus, Ohio, to host the 2016 convention.

== Economic Development ==
After his DNC tenure, Wilhelm moved into impact investing, starting venture capital funds to support entrepreneurs in the Midwest (Hopewell Ventures) and Central Appalachia (Adena Ventures), regions that had not been receiving significant investment compared to coastal areas. Adena received funding in part from the U.S. Small Business Administration's New Markets Venture Capital Program.

In 2010, Wilhelm co-chaired a ballot initiative that created a state constitutional amendment enabling $700 million in bonds to fund Ohio Third Frontier, a now-$2.3 billion program that supports technology-based economic development and innovation. He is also a founder of the Ohio Appalachian Business Council.

== Renewable Energy ==
Wilhelm is co-founder and chair of HGR Energy, a company that develops solar and battery storage projects in African countries including Algeria, South Africa, Sierra Leone, Zambia, The Gambia, and Botswana. Developments include Project AWAL GreenH2, which aims to produce green hydrogen from renewable energy for use in green steel production in Algeria, and three solar PV projects with the University of Zambia.

HGR Energy is a spin-off of Hecate Energy, which Wilhelm joined as partner and chief strategy officer in 2013 when it was a startup. Hecate develops utility-scale energy parks spanning solar, battery storage, wind, and thermal generation. Its portfolio of renewable and thermal power projects is spread across 26 states in the U.S. As of January 2026, Hecate has sold more than 12 GW of projects and is expected to go public with a listing on the NASDAQ. Hecate is partnering with the Power Africa initiative launched under President Barack Obama, which has aimed to double access to electricity in sub-Saharan Africa.

== Non-Profit Work ==
Wilhelm served as co-chair of the Strategic Partners Group of the Voinovich School of Leadership and Public Affairs at Ohio University and a co-founder of its Center for Public and Social Innovation. He won the university's 2025 Konneker Medal for Commercialization and Entrepreneurship. Wilhelm is also a board member of the Environmental Law and Policy Center.

In the 1980s, Wilhelm was the executive director of Citizens for Tax Justice, an organization that pushed to close corporate tax loopholes. He was a co-author of studies that created a turning point in the successful effort to pass the federal Tax Reform Act in 1986.

Party political offices
Preceded by Ron Brown	Chair of the Democratic National Committee; 1993–1994	Succeeded by Debra DeLee
