= Tim Cahill (Massachusetts politician) =

American politician (born 1958)

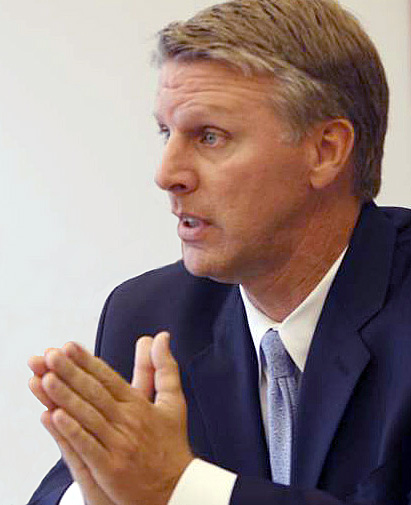
- Cahill in 2010

56th Treasurer and Receiver-General of Massachusetts
- In office January 2, 2003 – January 3, 2011
- Governor: Mitt Romney; Deval Patrick
- Preceded by: Shannon O'Brien
- Succeeded by: Steve Grossman

Norfolk County Treasurer
- In office 1997–2002
- Preceded by: Robert Hall
- Succeeded by: Joseph Connolly

Member of the Quincy City Council from the at-large district
- In office 1987–1996

Personal details
- Born: Timothy Patrick Cahill; December 1, 1958 (age 67) Norwood, Massachusetts, U.S.
- Party: Independent (2009–present)
- Other political affiliations: Democratic (before 2009)
- Spouse: Tina Cahill

Timothy Patrick Cahill (born December 1, 1958) is an American former politician who served as Massachusetts Treasurer and Receiver-General and was an independent candidate in the 2010 Massachusetts gubernatorial election.

== Early life ==
Cahill graduated from the Boston University College of Arts and Sciences in 1981. Cahill is second generation Irish. His parents Eamon Cahill, a bricklayer and Eileen Cahill (nee O’Shaughnessy) a homemaker emigrated from Thurles, Co.Tipperary in the 1930s.

== Early political career ==
Cahill's first attempt to be elected to political office came in 1981, when he unsuccessfully ran for a seat on the Quincy City Council. He ran again in 1987, at the age of 29, and was elected, where he served until 2003. He was reelected seven times and served as the chair of the finance committee.

In 1996, Cahill was elected as Norfolk County treasurer and served until 2002, when he began his campaign for state treasurer. In the 2002 Democratic primary, Cahill won a four-way race that included another candidate with the same surname, Michael P. Cahill, and was elected state Treasurer in the general election.

During Cahill's tenure as treasurer, the Massachusetts Lottery raised $7.2 billion. Much of the money went to cities and towns in the form of local aid.

On July 7, 2009, The Boston Globe reported that Cahill was planning to leave the Democratic Party. On September 9, 2009, Cahill announced that he would run in the 2010 Massachusetts gubernatorial election as an independent.

== State Treasurer ==
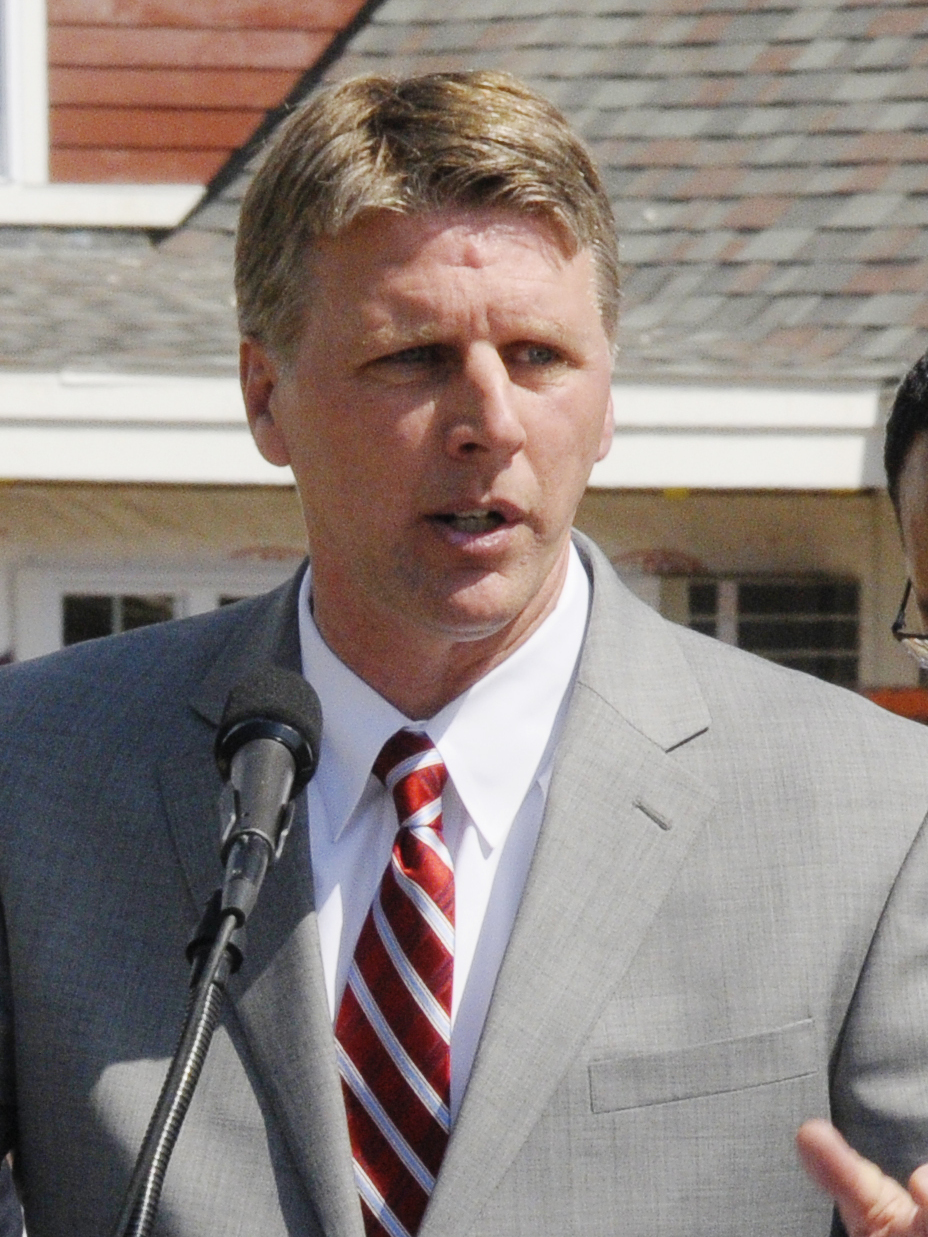
Cahill speaking in 2008

=== Massachusetts School Building Authority ===
During his tenure as state Treasurer, Cahill was Chairman of the seven-member Board of Directors. He filed the legislation to reform the School Building Assistance Program (SBA) in 2004. He worked with Governor Mitt Romney and the legislature to pass that legislation.

Prior to the reform, Governor Romney said the SBA could be "the next Big Dig." As chair of the newly authorized Massachusetts School Building Authority (MSBA) that received the prior SBA's responsibilities and debts, Cahill lead the initial years of the entity's activities. The MSBA has received praise from members of both parties for its fiscal management and effectiveness.

=== Pension Reserves Investment Management Board ===
As Treasurer, Cahill served as Chairman of the nine-member Pension Reserves Investment Management (PRIM) Board, which is charged with the general supervision of the Pension Reserves Investment Trust Fund.

=== The Massachusetts Lottery ===
Cahill was Chairman of the five-member Lottery Commission, which was established by the Legislature in 1971 to provide local aid to Massachusetts cities and towns, as well as the state Arts Council and the Massachusetts Cultural Council.

As of April 24, 2010, Massachusetts Lottery FY10 sales are about $3.636 billion while FY09 sales during same period were $3.645 billion, a dropoff of 0.25 percent from year to year. The state's lottery will post record profits that year - $903 million - while lottery sales stayed even. Cities and towns expect to receive an extra $44 million from lottery revenue. Cahill has argued that the increased revenues are the product of spending cuts and new games. Since taking office in 2003, the Lottery has returned $7.3 billion in Local Aid to cities and towns.

=== Massachusetts health care reform ===
Cahill is a vocal critic of the state's health care reform bill, often called "Romneycare" for Governor Mitt Romney, who signed the legislation into law, and which Cahill has called "a fiscal train wreck" that has "blown a hole in the Commonwealth's budget." While projected to cost the taxpayers only $88 million in 2006, the actual cost of the Bay State's healthcare system was over $4 billion.

== 2010 campaign for governor ==
Cahill ran as an independent for the office of governor of Massachusetts, with former State Representative Paul Loscocco (R) as his running mate. He ran against incumbent Governor Deval Patrick (D) and the former Harvard Pilgrim Healthcare CEO Charlie Baker (R).

Some pre-election polls showed that Cahill would draw votes from both Patrick and Baker equally, which showed his moderate and centrist position in the race. A Boston Globe poll, published on September 26, 2010, showed Cahill to be drawing more votes from Patrick than from Baker.

On October 1, 2010, Loscocco announced he was withdrawing from the race for lieutenant governor and was endorsing Baker although it was too late to remove his name from the ballot as Cahill's running mate. Speculation immediately began over Loscocco's motives and the role of the Baker camp in the decision in which Baker joined Loscocco for the announcement.

Cahill filed a lawsuit that alleged that Loscocco had colluded with former Cahill Republican staffers to orchestrate his abandonment and e-mails exchanged between Loscocco's top advisor. The lawsuit sought to prevent the staffers from sharing proprietary information with the Baker campaign.

Cahill received 8% of the vote at the November 2, 2010 general election.

== Post-political career ==
After leaving the office of treasurer, Cahill became a securities broker in November 2011 with Compass Securities Corporation of Braintree, Massachusetts. Cahill ended his employment with Compass on March 7, 2017, shortly after he had paid off his $100,000 civil fine and completed his probationary period from a 2013 settlement with Massachusetts Attorney General Martha Coakley (see next section).

In July, 2017, Cahill began as the president and executive director of the Quincy Chamber of Commerce. At the time, he stated that he had no interest in running for public office again. In 2025, he became president and CEO of the South Shore Chamber of Commerce.

== Corruption trial ==
Adam Meldrum, Cahill's campaign manager during his 2010 campaign for governor, alleged that Cahill colluded with the Massachusetts Lottery, which is overseen by the state treasurer's office, to run an ad favorable to him during the campaign. The ad, paid for by the Commonwealth, described the Massachusetts Lottery "the most successful state lottery in America" and "consistently well-managed," which echoed themes from Cahill's gubernatorial campaign. Both Cahill and Massachusetts Lottery Director Mark Cavanagh denied the allegations. On October 18, e-mails released in conjunction with Cahill's lawsuit appeared to reveal that the campaign attempted to have the Lottery air a series of ads that praised the lottery's management. In the e-mails, Cahill's campaign media strategist Dane Strother told Meldrum to "Get the Lottery immediately cutting a spot and get it up...Needs to focus on the Lottery being the best in the country and above reproach." Two days later, Cahill's senior adviser Scott Campbell wrote, "I think the first thing is to figure out what/where/how we want to do this .. with Lottery people."

On April 2, 2012, Cahill was indicted by a grand jury on charges that he used $1.65 million in Massachusetts State Lottery advertising to aid his campaign for governor in 2010. On December 12, 2012, a mistrial was declared in the corruption case after the jury failed to reach a verdict on two counts of conspiracy. Attorney General Martha Coakley said that she would review her options before she decided whether to pursue another trial.

On March 1, 2013, Cahill agreed to pay a $100,000 civil fine in exchange for the prosecution dropping its criminal corruption case against him.

In February 2017, Cahill posted to his FINRA Broker Check record that the "monetary fine (sic) paid in full as of 1/27/2017 and on 2/1/2017 the court dismissed the case; all four charges were dismissed after the completion of the probation period."

== Notes ==
Party political offices
Preceded by Shannon O'Brien	Democratic nominee for Treasurer and Receiver-General of Massachusetts; 2002, 2006	Succeeded by Steven Grossman
Political offices
Preceded by Shannon O'Brien	Treasurer and Receiver-General of Massachusetts; 2003–2011	Succeeded by Steven Grossman
