= Daniel R. Carey =

Massachusetts politician

Daniel Carey
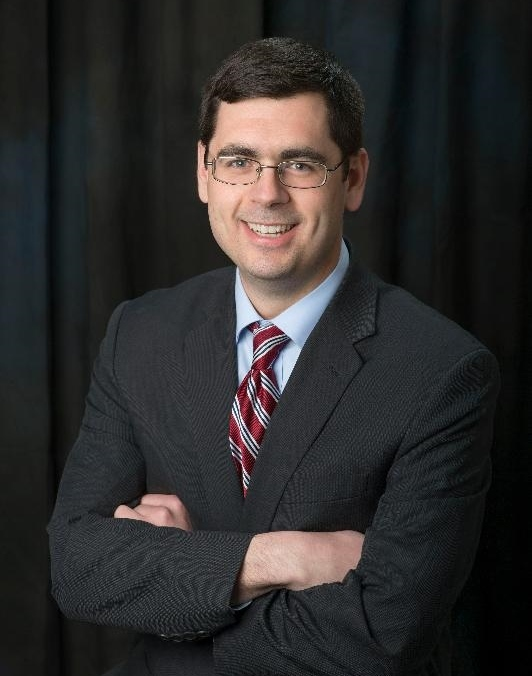

Member of the Massachusetts House of Representatives from the 2nd Hampshire District
- In office 2019–2025
- Preceded by: John Scibak
- Succeeded by: Homar Gomez

Personal details
- Party: Democratic Party
- Spouse: Melissa Carey
- Children: 2
- Education: Emmanuel College (Massachusetts) (BA); Western New England University School of Law (JD)

Daniel Carey is a State Representative who represents the 2nd Hampshire District in the Massachusetts House of Representatives. He represents the towns of Easthampton, Hadley, South Hadley, and Granby. Carey serves on the Joint Committee on Education, the Joint Committee on Election Laws, the Joint Committee on Environment, Natural Resources and Agriculture, and the Joint Committee on Mental Health, Substance Use and Recovery.

Before serving as a State Representative, Carey served as a City Councilor at Large in Easthampton. Before serving as City Councilor, Carey served on the Easthampton school committee.

== See also ==
- 2019–2020 Massachusetts legislature
- 2021–2022 Massachusetts legislature
