= Susan Kelley =

Susan Kelley may refer to:

- Susan Kelley (figure skater) (born 1954)
- Susan J. Kelley, Dean of the College of Health and Human Sciences at Georgia State University

== See also ==
- Susan Kelly, American model and actress
- Sue W. Kelly, congresswoman
