= 2006 Massachusetts elections =

2006 Massachusetts general election
- November 7, 2006

Part of the 2006 United States elections

The 2006 Massachusetts general election was held on November 7, 2006, throughout Massachusetts.

At the federal level, Ted Kennedy was re-elected to the United States Senate, and all ten seats in the United States House of Representatives were won by incumbent Democratic Party candidates.

Incumbent Republican Governor Mitt Romney did not run for re-election and was succeeded by Democrat Deval Patrick. Martha Coakley was elected Attorney General. Democratic incumbents were re-elected Secretary of the Commonwealth, Auditor, and Treasurer.

In the Massachusetts General Court, Democrats gained one seat in the Senate and two seats in the House.

== Governor and Lieutenant Governor ==
Incumbent Republican governor Mitt Romney chose not to seek re-election for a second term in office.

Primary elections for Governor and Lieutenant Governor were conducted separately with the Democrats nominating former Assistant U.S. Attorney General Deval Patrick and Mayor of Worcester Tim Murray. The Republicans nominated a ticket of incumbent Lieutenant Governor Kerry Healey and former State Representative Reed Hillman.

Patrick and Murray were elected Governor and Lieutenant Governor in the general election.

== Secretary of the Commonwealth ==
2006 election for Massachusetts Secretary of the Commonwealth
- November 7, 2006
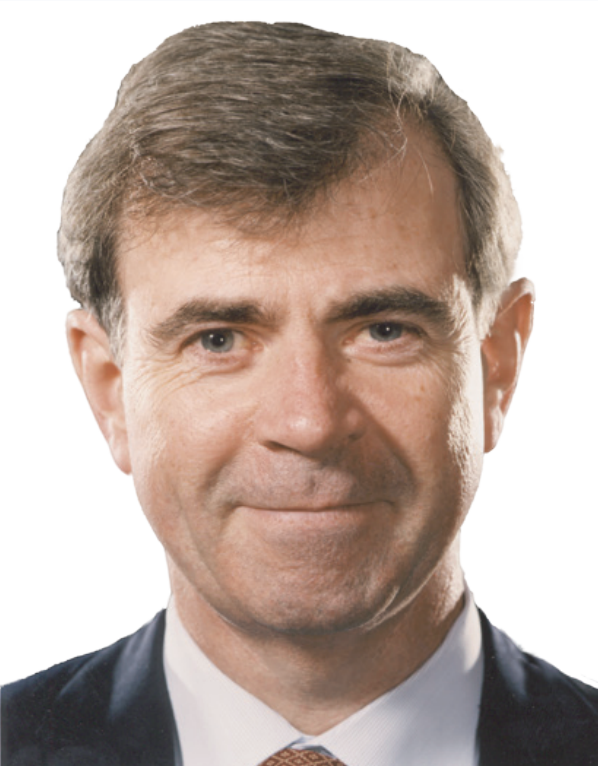

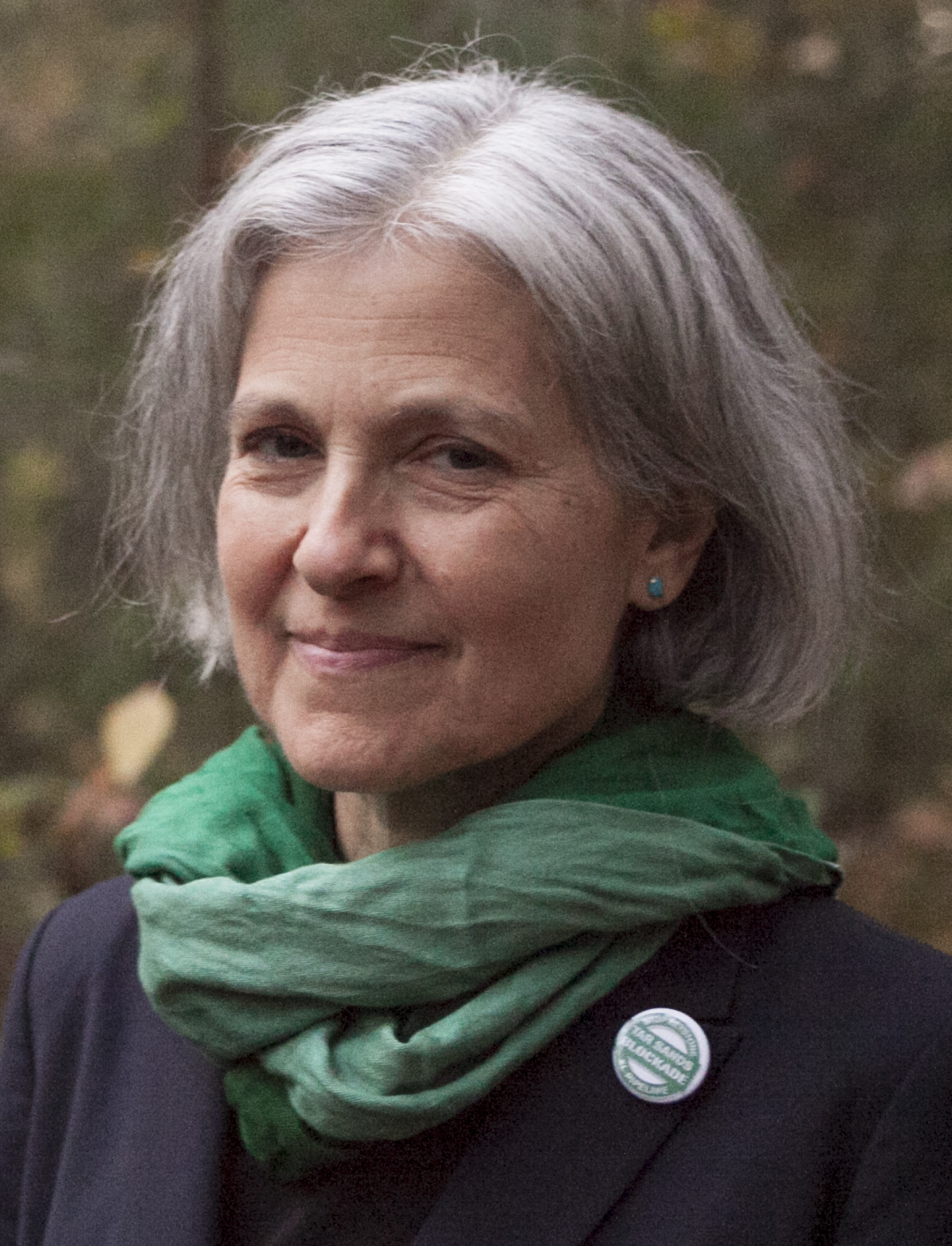
Nominee	William F. Galvin	Jill Stein
Party	Democratic	Green
Popular vote	1,638,594	353,551
Percentage	82.02%	17.70%
- Galvin: 50–60% 60–70% 70–80% 80–90% >90%
Secretary of the Commonwealth before election
William F. Galvin
Democratic
Elected Secretary of the Commonwealth
William F. Galvin
Democratic

Incumbent Democratic Secretary William F. Galvin ran for re-election to a fourth term in office. He was opposed in the Democratic primary by John C. Bonifaz, a voting-rights activist who founded the National Voting Rights Institute.

=== Democratic primary ===
==== Polling ====
Source	Date	MoE	Candidates		
Democratic Primary			William F. Galvin	John Bonifaz	Und
Suffolk University	August 17–21, 2006	±5.1%	49%	5%	46%
Suffolk University	June 22–26, 2006	±4.0%	50%	9%	38%

==== Results ====
Democratic Secretary of the Commonwealth Primary
Party	Candidate	Votes	%
Democratic	William F. Galvin (incumbent)	633,035	82.84%
Democratic	John Bonifaz	129,012	17.00%
Write-in	All others	1,997	0.26%
None	Blank votes	162,358	

=== General election ===
In the general election, Galvin's only challenger was Green-Rainbow nominee Jill Stein, a medical doctor and community activist who ran for governor in 2002.

==== Polling ====
Source	Date	MoE	Candidates		
General Election			Galvin (D)	Stein (GR)	Und.
Suffolk University	October 20–23, 2006	±4.9%	57%	13%	31%
Suffolk University	October 2–4, 2006	±4.4%	56%	11%	33%
Suffolk University	August 17–21, 2006	±4.0%	54%	11%	35%
Suffolk University	June 22–26, 2006	±4.0%	52%	9%	35%
Suffolk University	May 3, 2006	±4.9%	46%	10%	43%
Suffolk University	April 3, 2006	±4.9%	46%	8%	44%

==== Results ====
2006 Massachusetts Secretary of the Commonwealth Election
Party	Candidate	Votes	%	±%
Democratic	William F. Galvin (incumbent)	1,638,594	82.02%	▲9.86
Green-Rainbow	Jill Stein	353,551	17.70%	New
Write-in		5,715	0.29%	▲0.20
Democratic hold		Swing		

== Attorney General ==
2006 Massachusetts Attorney General election
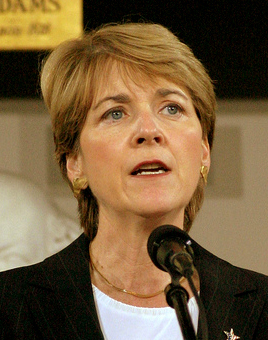

Nominee	Martha Coakley	Larry Frisoli
Party	Democratic	Republican
Popular vote	1,546,582	569,822
Percentage	72.9%	27.1%
- Coakley: 50–60% 60–70% 70–80% 80–90% >90% Frisoli: 50–60%
Attorney General before election
Thomas Reilly
Democratic
Elected Attorney General
Martha Coakley
Democratic

Incumbent Attorney General Thomas Reilly ran for Governor instead of seeking a third term in office.

Democratic Middlesex County District Attorney Martha Coakley was elected Attorney General, defeating former Norfolk County District Attorney Republican Larry Frisoli, a trial attorney from Belmont who was known for his handling of the Jeffery Curley case against NAMBLA. Both candidates were unopposed for nomination in their parties' primaries.

=== General election ===
==== Polling ====
Source	Date	MoE	Coakley (D)	Frisoli (R)	Und.
Suffolk University	October 20–23, 2006	±4.9%	59%	18%	14%
Suffolk University	October 2–4, 2006	±4.4%	52%	15%	33%
Suffolk University	August 17–21, 2006	±4.0%	50%	9%	39%
Suffolk University	June 22–26, 2006	±4.0%	50%	16%	33%
Suffolk University	May 3, 2006	±4.9%	49%	13%	36%

==== Results ====
2006 Massachusetts Attorney General Election
Party	Candidate	Votes	%	±%
Democratic	Martha Coakley	1,546,582	72.86%	▼26.38
Republican	Larry Frisoli	569,822	27.06%	New
Write-in		1,840	0.09%	▼0.67
Democratic hold		Swing		

== Treasurer and Receiver-General ==
2006 election for Massachusetts Treasurer and Receiver-General
- November 7, 2006
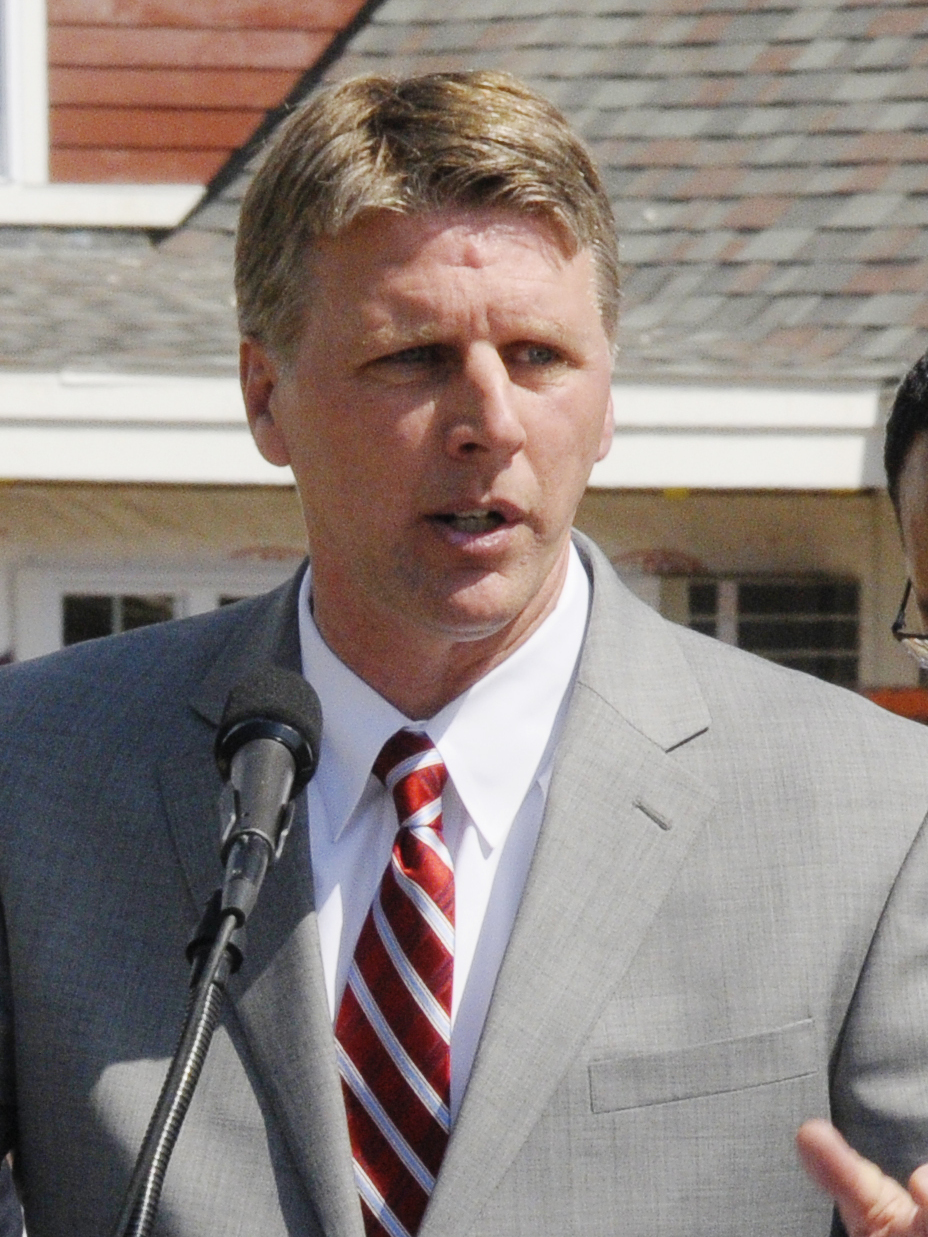

Nominee	Tim Cahill	James O'Keefe
Party	Democratic	Green
Popular vote	1,644,162	323,765
Percentage	83.35%	16.41%
- Cahill: 60–70% 70–80% 80–90%
Treasurer and Receiver-General before election
Timothy P. Cahill
Democratic
Elected Treasurer and Receiver-General
Timothy P. Cahill
Democratic

Incumbent Democrat Timothy P. Cahill was re-elected over Green-Rainbow candidate James O'Keefe, who also ran in 2002. Republican Ronald K. Davy, a financial analyst and Hull selectman, was nominated but failed to reach signature requirement to qualify for the ballot.

=== General election ===
==== Polling ====
Source	Date	MoE	Cahill (D)	O'Keefe (GR)	Davy (R)	Und.
Suffolk University	October 20–23, 2006	±4.9%	56%	15%		29%
Suffolk University	October 2–4, 2006	±4.4%	51%	11%		37%
Suffolk University	August 17–21, 2006	±4.0%	48%	10%		42%
Suffolk University	June 22–26, 2006	±4.0%	47%	7%	10%	35%
Suffolk University	May 3, 2006	±4.9%	46%	6%	6%	41%
Suffolk University	April 3, 2006	±4.9%	40%	21%		30%

==== Results ====
2006 Massachusetts Treasurer Election
Party	Candidate	Votes	%	±%
Democratic	Tim Cahill (incumbent)	1,641,196	83.35%	▲32.69
Green-Rainbow	James O'Keefe	323,765	16.41%	▲8.45
Write-in		4,590	0.23%	▲0.19
Democratic hold		Swing		

== Auditor ==
2006 election for Massachusetts Auditor
- November 7, 2006
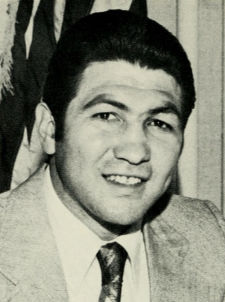

Nominee	Joe DeNucci	Rand Wilson
Party	Democratic	Working Families
Popular vote	1,560,782	371,057
Percentage	80.62%	19.17%
- DeNucci: 60–70% 70–80% 80–90%
Auditor before election
Joe DeNucci
Democratic
Elected Auditor
Joe DeNucci
Democratic

Incumbent Democrat Joe DeNucci was re-elected for a sixth term over Working Families nominee Rand Wilson, a union organizer and labor communicator. Republican candidate Earle Stroll, a 52-year-old small-business consultant from Bolton, also failed to reach signature requirement to qualify for the ballot. Green-Rainbow candidate Nathanael Fortune, a physicist from Smith College and a Whatley School Committee member, dropped out of the race for personal reasons in late March 2006.

=== General election ===
==== Polling ====
Source	Date	MoE	DeNucci (D)	Wilson (WF)	Und.
Suffolk University	October 20–23, 2006	±4.9%	56%	10%	35%
Suffolk University	October 2–4, 2006	±4.4%	48%	13%	38%
Suffolk University	August 17–21, 2006	±4.0%	46%	11%	42%

==== Results ====
2006 Massachusetts Auditor Election
Party	Candidate	Votes	%	±%
Democratic	A. Joseph DeNucci (incumbent)	1,560,782	80.62%	▲2.75
Working Families	Rand Wilson	371,057	19.17%	▲19.17
Write-in		4,066	0.21%	▲0.10
Democratic hold		Swing		

== Ballot questions ==
There were three statewide ballot questions, all initiatives, which the Massachusetts voters voted on this election, and all were defeated. There were also various local ballot questions around the state.

Statewide Questions:

- Question 1 - Sale of Wine by Food Stores. A law to allow local authorities to license stores selling groceries to sell wine.
- Question 2 - Nomination of Candidates for Public Office. A law to create "more ballot choices" by allowing for fusion voting.
- Question 3 - Family Child Care Providers. A law to allow home-based family child care providers providing state-subsidized care to bargain collectively with the state government.

=== Polling ===
Source	Date	MoE	Question	Yes	No	Und
UNH/Globe	October 22–25, 2006	±4.1%	Wine in food stores	57%	38%	5%
Suffolk University	October 20–23, 2006	±4.9%	Wine in food stores	52%	40%	8%
Suffolk University	October 20–23, 2006	±4.9%	Fusion voting	26%	51%	23%
Suffolk University	October 20–23, 2006	±4.9%	Collective bargaining for childcare providers	34%	36%	30%
Suffolk University	October 10–11, 2006	±4.9%	Wine in food stores	50%	41%	9%
Suffolk University	October 2–4, 2006	±4.4%	Wine in food stores	47%	44%	9%
Suffolk University	October 2–4, 2006	±4.4%	Fusion voting	27%	48%	24%
Suffolk University	October 2–4, 2006	±4.4%	Collective bargaining for childcare providers	42%	33%	25%
Suffolk University	August 17–21, 2006	±4.0%	Wine in food stores	54%	38%	8%
Suffolk University	August 17–21, 2006	±4.0%	Fusion voting	35%	48%	18%
Suffolk University	August 17–21, 2006	±4.0%	Collective bargaining for childcare providers	46%	32%	22%
Suffolk University	June 27, 2006	±4.0%	Wine in food stores	61%	31%	9%
Suffolk University	June 27, 2006	±4.0%	Fusion voting	34%	48%	19%
Suffolk University	June 27, 2006	±4.0%	Collective bargaining for childcare providers	42%	37%	22%

=== Results ===
==== Question 1 ====
Massachusetts Question 1 (2006)
- Sale of Wine by Food Stores

Results
Choice	Votes	%
Yes	915,076	43.66%
No	1,180,708	56.34%
Valid votes	2,095,784	100.00%
Invalid or blank votes	0	0.00%
Total votes	2,095,784	100.00%

Yes
50–60%
No
70–80%
60–70%
50–60%

Sale of Wine by Food Stores. A law to allow local authorities to license stores selling groceries to sell wine.

Question 1: Wine in Food Stores
Candidate		Votes	%	±
	Yes	915,076	44%	
✓	No	1,180,708	56%	

==== Question 2 ====
Massachusetts Question 2 (2006)
- Nomination of Candidates for Public Office

Results
Choice	Votes	%
Yes	688,096	34.57%
No	1,302,143	65.43%
Valid votes	1,990,239	100.00%
Invalid or blank votes	0	0.00%
Total votes	1,990,239	100.00%

Yes
50–60%
No
70–80%
60–70%
50–60%

A law to create "more ballot choices" by allowing for fusion voting.

Question 2: Fusion Voting
Candidate		Votes	%	±
	Yes	688,096	35%	
✓	No	1,302,143	65%	

==== Question 3 ====
A law to allow home-based family child care providers providing state-subsidized care to bargain collectively with the state government.

Massachusetts Question 3 (2006)
- Family Care Worker Unionization

Results
Choice	Votes	%
Yes	951,988	47.89%
No	1,035,707	52.11%
Valid votes	1,987,695	100.00%
Invalid or blank votes	0	0.00%
Total votes	1,987,695	100.00%

Yes
70–80%
60–70%
50–60%
No
70–80%
60–70%
50–60%
Tie
50%

Question 3: Family Care Worker Unionization
Candidate		Votes	%	±
	Yes	951,988	48%	
✓	No	1,035,707	52%	
