= Fells Acres day care sexual abuse trial =

American day-care sex-abuse trial

The Fells Acres day care sexual abuse trial took place in the Commonwealth of Massachusetts following charges initially lodged in the mid-1980s against family members who operated a day care center, Fells Acres Day School, in Malden, Massachusetts. The facility had been opened in 1966 by Violet Amirault (1923–1997). She and her two children—son Gerald Amirault (born 1954) and daughter Cheryl Amirault LeFave (born c. 1957)—were tried for sexually abusing children at their facility. Gerald was tried in 1986 while his sister and mother were tried in 1987. All three were convicted and sentenced to prison. The Amiraults deny the charges, which supporters regard as a conspicuous example of day-care sex-abuse hysteria.

Violet and Cheryl were freed on appeal in 1995. Violet died in 1997. The appeal was ultimately denied, but Cheryl avoided a return to prison via a deal struck with prosecutors in October 1999. Gerald was released on parole in 2004. Their convictions have been strongly criticized, especially with regard to interviewing techniques that were used with the alleged victims.

== Accusations and investigation ==
In 1984, a four-year-old student at the Fells Acres Day School wet himself while napping. Upon direction by the child's teacher, Gerald Amirault changed the boy into spare clothing. Later that year, the boy was discovered playing sexually-suggestive games with his cousin. Questioned about this by his mother and uncle, who himself had been molested as a child, the boy said that Amirault had sexually abused him. Soon thereafter, Amirault was arrested on charges of raping the boy. His arrest, and suspension of the facility's license by the state, were widely reported by the Associated Press and other wire services starting on September 13.

The police called the parents of all the children to a meeting at the police station to discuss the situation. They were instructed to interview their children and to look for signs of sexual abuse. Examples of behaviors parents were told were symptomatic of abuse included bed wetting, changes in appetite and nightmares. The children were also questioned by the police, social workers, therapists, and others.

== Arrests and trial ==
Eventually, Amirault was charged with molesting more children, and charges were brought against his mother, Violet Amirault, and sister, Cheryl Amirault LeFave.

In 1986, Gerald Amirault was convicted of assaulting and raping nine children and sentenced to 30 to 40 years in prison. In 1987, in a separate trial, his mother and sister were convicted of similar crimes against four children and sentenced to jail for eight to 20 years. At both trials, the children testified in open court sitting directly in front of the jury with their backs to the defendants and their faces to the jurors.

=== Interviews of children as evidence ===
Much of the Commonwealth of Massachusetts' case depended on the information obtained in the interviews of the children who were allegedly sexually abused by the Amiraults. The interviews claimed that the children were raped with knives, sticks, forks, and magic wands; were assaulted by a clown (allegedly Gerald) in a "secret room" and a "magic room"; were forced to drink urine; were tied naked to a tree; and subjected to many other acts.

The main criticism of this case centered on the reliability of the information obtained from the children. The bulk of the evidence was developed through videotaped interviews conducted by Susan J. Kelley, a pediatric nurse. The children repeatedly told interviewers, including Kelley, that nothing happened to them, that there were no secret rooms, and there was no clown. However, the questioning continued and eventually the children claimed all these things happened. One police officer, John Rivers, said at a seminar that interviewing the children was "like getting blood from a stone". At one point, an interviewer told a child that the child's friend had already testified that the clown had them take their clothes off. The girl being interviewed denied this happened, at which point the interviewer said that she believed what the child's friend told her. Kelley also rejected alternative explanations for events and ignored the children's denials of the abuse scenarios. The chief prosecutor of both of the Amirault cases maintained that "the children testified to being photographed and molested by acts that included penetration by objects ... the implication ... that the children's allegations of abuse were tainted by improper interviewing is groundless and not true."

== Post-trial ==
In October 1992, Violet and Cheryl's sentences were reduced by their original trial judge, John Paul Sullivan of the Middlesex County Superior Court, but the Massachusetts Supreme Judicial Court (SJC) reversed that ruling in 1993.

In March 1995, Charles M. Sennott published an article in The Boston Globe that was sympathetic towards the Amiraults and reported that Miriam Holmes, who was assigned as a counselor by the Department of Correction to Violet and Cheryl, and Joel Skolnick, who counseled Cheryl, believed that both women were innocent. Joel Skolnick, a Licensed Independent Clinical Social Worker (LICSW), interviewed Cheryl Amirault while she was incarcerated in MCI Framingham as well as reviewed transcripts of interviews administered by the Department of Social Services. Skolnick determined that the interviews were not administered properly and biased the children's responses, making them unreliable. Furthermore, he noted that the vast majority of sex offenders will readily confess to their crimes if offered freedom in exchange for doing so, and that because of this the steadfast refusal of the Amiraults to do the same was further indication of their innocence. A study by a McGill University psychologist of hundreds of children aged 4 to 6 found that the kind of prolonged, repeated questioning used on the children in the Amirault case frequently results in false reports. Other studies had shown that the method of interrogation via anatomically correct dolls also had an incredibly great margin of error.

=== Appeals ===
In August 1995, after serving eight years in state prison, Violet and Cheryl were freed on a successful appeal. A Superior Court judge, Robert Barton, ruled that their convictions were wrongful because they were not able to directly confront their accusers. A similar appeal on behalf of Gerald Amirault was denied in November 1995, and the SJC reinstated the women's convictions in March 1997, citing the need for "finality".

In May 1997, another Superior Court judge, Isaac Borenstein, granted the women separate motions for new trials. Borenstein ruled that the children's interrogations were so tainted by "grave errors" in the investigation process that they could not be used in any new trial. He explained that:

These grave errors led to the testimony of the children being forever tainted. The only allegations made by the child witnesses occurred after they were subjected to the admittedly suggestive interviews, and investigative techniques, as well as inappropriate - even if understandable - influence by their families. Moreover, neither behavioral symptoms nor physical evidence which may be consistent with child sexual abuse were revealed until after the children and their families were subjected to these improper interviewing and investigative techniques. These alleged symptoms were only discussed after the families were overwhelmed by the panic, hysteria and media attention that snowballed this case into national headlines and widespread concern about ritualistic sexual abuse of children.

While awaiting resolution, Violet Amirault died, in September 1997.

In August 1999, the SJC again reinstated Cheryl Amirault LeFave's conviction, and the following month, rejected her request for a new trial. As a result, she was expected to be ordered back to prison. However, in October 1999, the new district attorney for Middlesex County, Martha Coakley, reached an agreement with the defense whereby Cheryl dropped efforts to clear her name and avoided returning to prison. Cheryl agreed to 10 years probation, and also could not give any television interviews, could not contact the families of the victims, could have no unsupervised contact with children, and could not profit in any way from her trial and imprisonment.

=== Later developments ===
Dorothy Rabinowitz, a member of the editorial board of The Wall Street Journal, was awarded the Pulitzer Prize for Commentary in 2001, partly for her coverage of the case." The case was featured in her 2003 book about miscarriages of justice, No Crueler Tyrannies.

The Massachusetts parole board recommended the commutation of Gerald Amirault's sentence in July 2001, an action that the alleged victims strenuously objected to. The then-Acting Governor, Jane Swift, rejected the decision in February 2002. Gerald Amirault was ultimately released from the Bay State Correctional Center on April 30, 2004.

In November 2022, outgoing Massachusetts Governor Charlie Baker recommended pardons for Gerald Amirault and Cheryl Amirault LeFave due to "grave doubt regarding the evidentiary strength" of their convictions. The recommendation required approval by the Massachusetts Governor's Council. Baker withdrew the recommendation on December 14, 2022, as "there didn't appear to be enough support" within the council.
