= Martha Coakley =

American lawyer and lobbyist

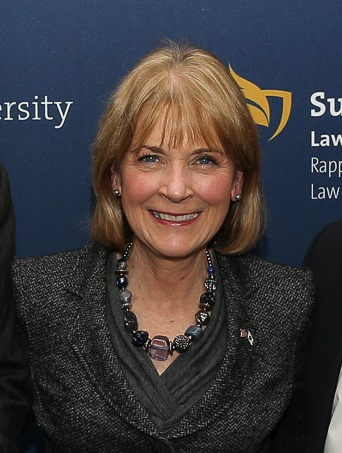
- Coakley in 2014

43rd Attorney General of Massachusetts
- In office January 17, 2007 – January 21, 2015
- Governor: Deval Patrick; Charlie Baker
- Preceded by: Thomas Reilly
- Succeeded by: Maura Healey

District Attorney for Middlesex County, Massachusetts
- In office January 3, 1999 – January 17, 2007
- Preceded by: Thomas Reilly
- Succeeded by: Gerard Leone

Personal details
- Born: Martha Mary Coakley; July 14, 1953 (age 73) Pittsfield, Massachusetts, U.S.
- Party: Democratic
- Spouse: Thomas O'Connor
- Education: Williams College (BA); Boston University (JD)

Martha Mary Coakley (born July 14, 1953) is an American politician, attorney and lobbyist from the state of Massachusetts. A Democrat, Coakley was District Attorney of Middlesex County from 1999 to 2007. She served as Attorney General of Massachusetts from 2007 to 2015.

Coakley was the Democratic nominee in the 2010 special election to fill the United States Senate seat that had been vacated due to the death of longtime U.S. Senator Ted Kennedy. Coakley's campaign was notable for its missteps; despite being heavily favored, she was defeated 52% to 47% by Republican Scott Brown in a major upset.

Coakley ran for Governor of Massachusetts in 2014, winning the Democratic nomination but losing the general election to Republican Charlie Baker. Following her tenure as attorney general, Coakley was a lobbyist for the e-cigarette company Juul.

== Early life and education ==
Martha Mary Coakley was born in Pittsfield, Massachusetts on July 14, 1953. The third of five children, she is the daughter of Edward J. and Phyllis E. Coakley. Her father was a World War II veteran, Korean War veteran, and small business owner. Her mother was a homemaker. Coakley grew up in North Adams, Massachusetts, where she attended St. Joseph's School and Drury High School. She graduated from Drury High School in 1971.

Coakley graduated cum laude with a Bachelor of Arts from Williams College in 1975. She earned a Juris Doctor from Boston University School of Law in 1979.

== Early career ==
After graduating from law school, Coakley began work as an associate at the law firm of Parker, Coulter, Daley & White and later practiced at Goodwin Procter—both in Boston, Massachusetts.

In 1986, Coakley became an assistant district attorney in Middlesex County. A year later, she was invited by the U.S. Justice Department to join its Boston Organized Crime Strike Force as a Special Attorney. Coakley returned to the District Attorney's office in 1989 and was appointed the Chief of the Child Abuse Prosecution Unit two years later.

In 1997, while serving under Middlesex County, Massachusetts, District Attorney Tom Reilly, Coakley and Gerry Leone led the courtroom prosecution of then 19-year-old English au pair Louise Woodward, who was later convicted in the shaking death of eight-month-old Matthew Eappen of Newton, Massachusetts.

== Middlesex County District Attorney ==
A Democrat, Coakley was first elected Middlesex County District Attorney in 1998. She served in that capacity from 1999 to 2007.

In 2001, Coakley successfully lobbied Acting Governor Jane Swift to deny clemency to Gerald Amirault, a defendant in the Fells Acres day care sexual abuse trial, whom many regarded as a victim of day care sex abuse hysteria. Clemency for Amirault had been recommended unanimously by the Massachusetts Parole Board. Amirault's co-accused mother and sister had already been released from custody. Wall Street Journal editorial board member Dorothy Rabinowitz cites Coakley's pursuit of the case despite lack of corroborating evidence as an example of questionable judgment on Coakley's part.

Coakley's actions as District Attorney in the sexual abuse case of a 23-month-old girl in 2005 have drawn sharp criticism. Coakley, who oversaw the grand jury for the case, did not immediately indict Keith Winfield, a Somerville police officer. On August 1, 2006, after a criminal complaint was threatened to be filed by Larry Frisoli, attorney for the victim's single mother and the Republican candidate running against Coakley for Attorney General, she indicted Winfield. She requested for him to be released without cash bail. The District Attorney succeeding Coakley subsequently secured a conviction. Winfield was given two life sentences for the crime. Coakley later defended her actions by saying she acted appropriately with the evidence that was available at the time. As of 2012, film producer Steve Audette was making a documentary about Winfield's prosecution, conviction, and continued assertion of innocence; Audette was denied access to recordings of the trial in March 2013.

== Massachusetts Attorney General ==
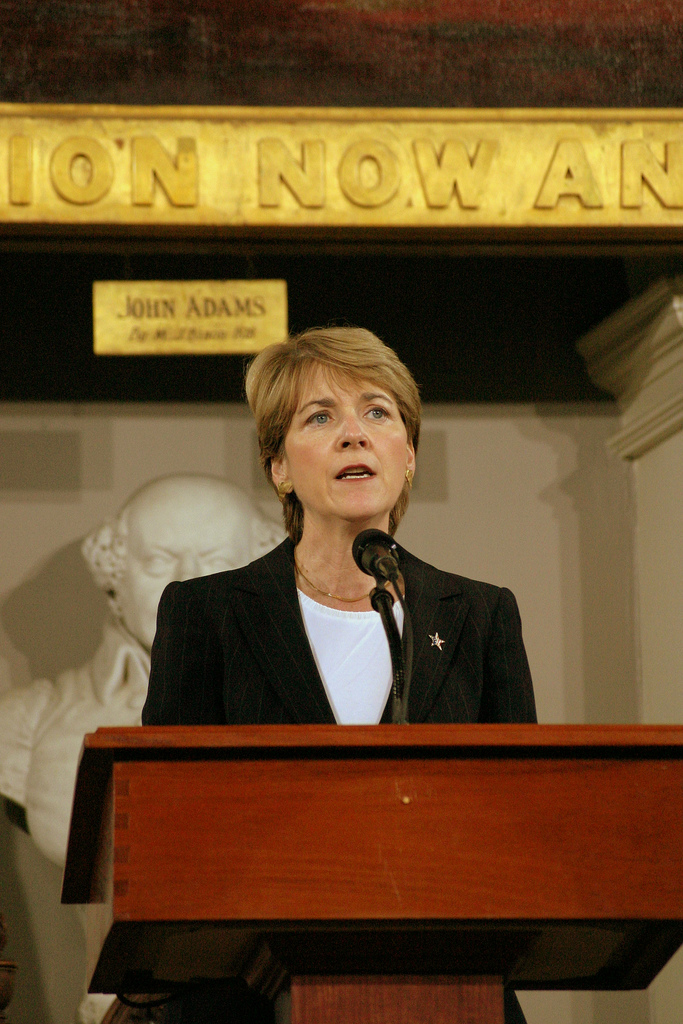
Coakley speaking at Faneuil Hall in 2007

Coakley was elected Massachusetts Attorney General in the 2006 general election, defeating Republican Larry Frisoli with 73 percent of the vote. She was sworn in on January 17, 2007. Coakley became the first woman to serve as Attorney General in Massachusetts. Coakley served as attorney general from 2007 to 2015.

During the Aqua Teen Hunger Force bomb scare in January 2007, Coakley was widely quoted in the press defending the reaction of Boston's emergency services. Small electronic signs advertising a cartoon had been mistaken for bombs; Massachusetts authorities halted traffic on two bridges and closed the Charles River before realizing the signs were harmless. Coakley defended the precautions because the LED signs had looked suspicious: "It had a very sinister appearance, it had a battery behind it, and wires."

Both of those accused of putting up the signs which caused the bomb scare were given plea bargains, received community service and apologized publicly.

In May 2007, Coakley testified before the Massachusetts State Legislature in support of the passage of a "buffer zone" law that created a 35-foot (11 m) buffer around entrances and driveways of reproductive health care facilities that offer abortion services. The law was signed into effect by Governor Deval Patrick on November 13, 2007, and was subsequently challenged by opponents and overturned by a unanimous decision of the Supreme Court as a violation of the First Amendment.

The next month, she signed a Guide to Consumer Credit and activated a Consumer Complaint and Information Hotline for helping people in financial difficulties.

In September 2008, Coakley worked with Apple Inc. and the National Federation of the Blind to have Apple redesign the popular iTunes software so it would comply with the federal Americans with Disabilities Act, as well as the Massachusetts Equal Rights Act.

In November 2008, Coakley unsuccessfully argued the case of Melendez-Diaz v. Massachusetts before the United States Supreme Court.

On February 5, 2009, she led an 18-state coalition urging the Environmental Protection Agency to take action in response to the 2007 U.S. Supreme Court ruling in Massachusetts v. EPA. Though the Supreme Court ruled that the EPA did have the authority to regulate greenhouse gases under the Clean Air Act, the Agency had yet to make an official decision on whether it believes that greenhouse gas emissions pose dangers to public health or welfare.

Coakley inherited litigation of the fatal 2006 Big Dig ceiling collapse from outgoing Attorney General Tom Reilly in 2007. On March 26, 2009, she settled the final lawsuit pertaining to the incident. Through eight lawsuits attached to the incident, Coakley's office recovered $610.625 million on behalf of the Commonwealth of Massachusetts.

Coakley declined to conduct a criminal investigation of an aide to Thomas M. Menino, Mayor of Boston, for allegedly violating laws regarding the destruction of public e-mail records, describing the request as politically motivated.

On July 8, 2009, Coakley filed a suit challenging the constitutionality of the Defense of Marriage Act. The suit claims that Congress "overstepped its authority, undermined states' efforts to recognize marriages between same-sex couples, and codified an animus towards gay and lesbian people." Massachusetts is the first state to challenge the legislation.

In 2009, Coakley won settlements of $60 million from Goldman Sachs and $10 million from Fremont Investment & Loan for their abuse of subprime loans and lending.

In 2010, Coakley helped draft a Massachusetts law regulating obscenity on the internet. In a decision celebrated by civil rights advocates, the law was overturned by a federal judge after a coalition of booksellers and website publishers sued, claiming the new law was unconstitutional and would hold criminally liable anyone who operates a website containing nudity or sexual material.

During Coakley's tenure as Attorney General, misconduct at Massachusetts' crime laboratories led to the reexamination of tens of thousands of drug convictions. Chemist Annie Dookhan was accused of forging reports and tampering with samples to produce desired results. Similarly, Sonja Farak was accused of tampering with the evidence she was tasked with analyzing by using it to get high herself. The actions of both women, who acted independently, resulted in tens of thousands of drug counts being dismissed, the largest single mass dismissal of criminal cases in U.S. history. How to Fix a Drug Scandal is an American true crime documentary miniseries that was released on Netflix on April 1, 2020, that was created by Erin Lee Carr, who followed the aftereffects of this notorious case.

In 2014, WGBH applauded Coakley for her efforts to further LGBT rights and women's rights; however, WGBH also described her as "an aggressive prosecutor who too often has put the needs of the commonwealth above the rights of the people" and "rarely corrects miscarriages of justice".

== Political campaigns ==
=== 1997 Massachusetts state representative campaign ===
In 1997, a special election was held for Boston's 16th Suffolk district to replace James T. Brett, who was resigning. Five candidates, including a "thoughtful, but unknown assistant DA named Martha Coakley," entered the race. Coakley lost the race to Marty Walsh, finishing in fourth place and receiving 11.7 percent of the vote.

=== 1998 District Attorney campaign ===
Coakley won the Democratic primary (48%) against Michael A. Sullivan (28%) and Timothy Flaherty (25%) and coasted to a 71–29% general election win against Republican Lee Johnson.

=== 2002 District Attorney campaign ===
Coakley was unopposed in both the primary and the general election.

=== 2006 Attorney General campaign ===
Coakley was unopposed in the Democratic primary. She won the General election (73%-27%) against Republican Larry Frisoli.

=== 2010 U.S. Senate campaign ===
On September 1, 2009, Coakley was the first candidate to take out nomination papers to run in a special election to succeed the late Edward M. Kennedy in the United States Senate in the special election in 2010. She won the Democratic primary on December 8, 2009. Her opponents were Republican Scott Brown and Libertarian Joseph L. Kennedy (no relation to the Kennedy family). Coakley was endorsed by The Boston Globe on January 14, 2010. She was heavily favored to win the race.

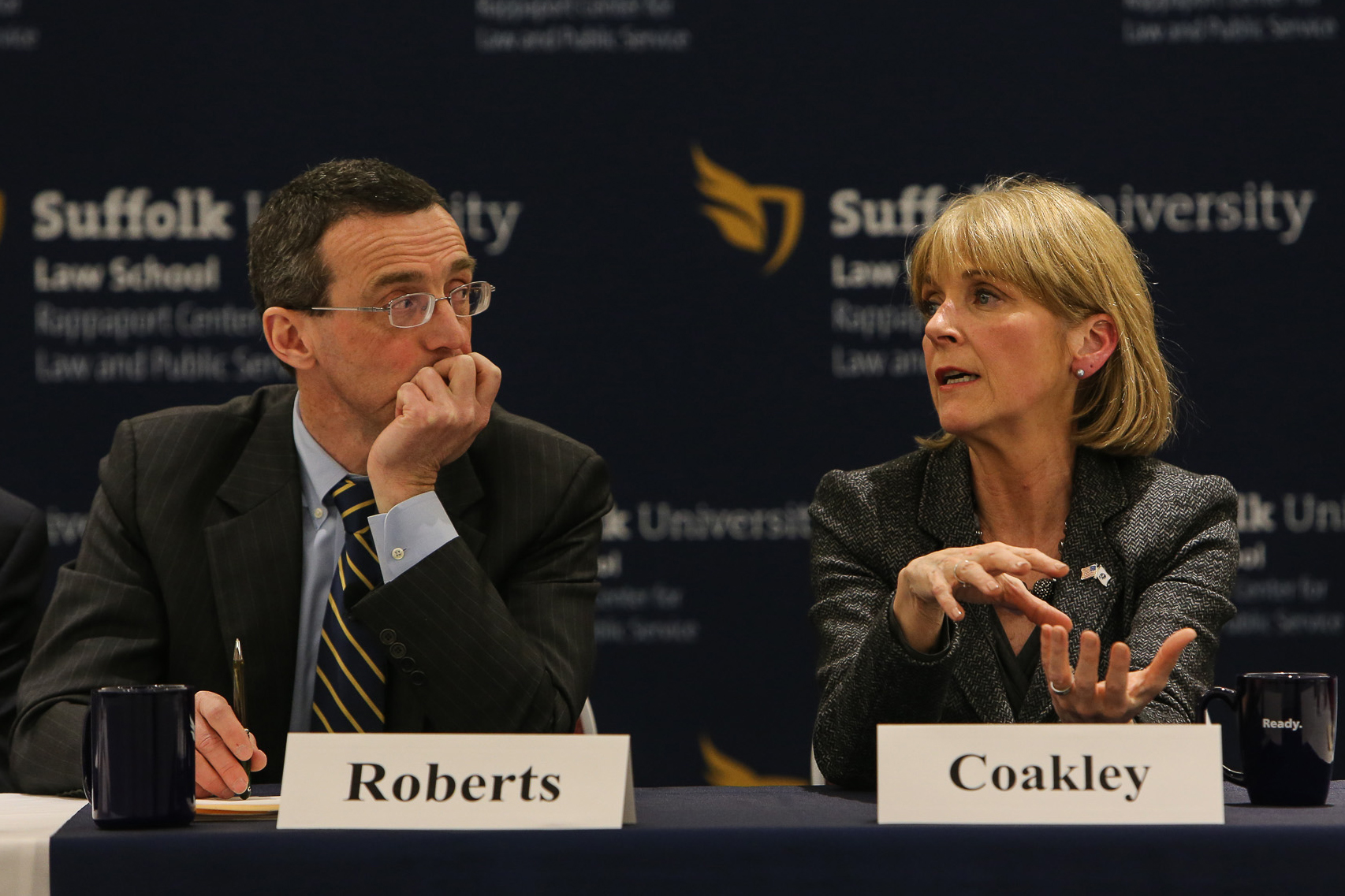
Martha Coakley speaks at roundtable for gubernatorial candidates hosted by the Rappaport Center for Law and Public Service, February 11, 2014. Alasdair Roberts, Rappaport Professor of Law and Public Policy, hosted the roundtable.

Less than a month before the election, Coakley took six days off from campaigning. Brown referred to this break as a vacation. The Boston Herald commented: "Laying low in the final weeks of a truncated election is unusual – and a luxury that only a very confident candidate could afford."

When criticized for leaving the state for a Washington fundraiser instead of campaigning, Coakley responded by asking, "As opposed to standing outside Fenway Park? In the cold? Shaking hands?" President Barack Obama later cited Coakley's remark as a defining moment for his presidency and for his healthcare proposal; to Obama, it reflected Coakley's inept handling of a race that should have been easily winnable.

Coakley also referred to Red Sox star pitcher and Brown supporter Curt Schilling as "another Yankee fan," making her a target of derision.

Brown asserted that Coakley behaved as if she was entitled to the Senate seat merely by dint of being the candidate of the Democratic Party. Famously, during one of the debates, he said: "It's not Kennedy's seat, and it's not the Democrats' seat; it's the people's seat".

In her last television debate January 11, 2010, at the University of Massachusetts Boston, when asked about the prospects of victory in Afghanistan, Coakley stated, "I think we have done what we are going to be able to do in Afghanistan. I think that we should plan an exit strategy. Yes. I'm not sure there is a way to succeed. If the goal was and the mission in Afghanistan was to go in because we believed that the Taliban was giving harbor to terrorists, we supported that. I supported that. They're gone. They're not there anymore. They're in, apparently Yemen, they're in Pakistan. Let's focus our efforts on where Al Qaeda is." This statement drew criticism from Scott Brown and his supporters, including Rudy Giuliani.

Coakley admitted to making a mistake on the financial disclosure forms for her Senate run, claiming to have no personal assets when she actually had an account under her husband's name with over $200,000 and a personal IRA containing approximately $12,000.

On January 19, 2010, Coakley was defeated by Brown 52% to 47% in the special election. Brown received 1,168,107 votes, Coakley received 1,058,682 votes, and Joseph L. Kennedy received 22,237 votes.

Coakley's defeat was considered a major upset. Her defeat "turned her into a political pariah and the butt of 'Saturday Night Live' sketches". Brown's unexpected victory "sent shock waves through the electoral landscape. Democrats in the Senate lost the 60th seat, imperiling their carefully crafted deal on health insurance reform and requiring serious reflection on what went wrong and how to correct it". Democratic commentators "blamed Coakley’s lackluster campaign effort" for the election outcome.

=== 2010 Attorney General campaign ===
Coakley ran for reelection in 2010, defeating Republican nominee Jim McKenna.

=== 2014 Massachusetts gubernatorial campaign ===
On September 15, 2013, WCVB-TV learned of Coakley's intention to run for the Massachusetts governorship when incumbent Democrat Deval Patrick retired in 2014. Coakley was set to formally announce her entry into the race the following Monday. She won the Democratic nomination on September 9, 2014. On November 4, 2014, she was narrowly defeated in the general election for governor by Republican Charlie Baker, who was endorsed by the Boston Globe despite the Globe's having endorsed Coakley four years prior in her Senate campaign.

After the election, the Globe wrote that Coakley had been "redeemed, even in defeat," saying that she had been a "relentless, and frequently terrific, campaigner" in the gubernatorial race.

== Post-political career ==
From 2015 through early 2019, Coakley worked for Foley Hoag, a Boston-based law firm, as a lawyer and lobbyist. While at the firm, Coakley represented the fantasy sports website DraftKings and student-loan firm Navient when state governments were examining the practices of these industries.

In April 2019, it was announced that Coakley had taken a full-time role with electronic cigarette maker Juul on their government affairs team. As a former attorney general, lobbying attorneys general for the vaping industry has called into question the ethics of Coakley's work for Juul, a leader in the electronic cigarette industry accused of marketing addictive nicotine products to youths. She lobbied for Juul until 2022.

Coakley returned to Foley Hoag after her stint at Juul. In 2025, she joined the Zucker Law Group.

== Personal life ==
Coakley resides in Medford, Massachusetts. She is married to retired police Deputy Superintendent Thomas F. O'Connor Jr.

== See also ==
- List of female state attorneys general in the United States

Legal offices
Preceded by Thomas Reilly	Attorney General of Massachusetts; 2007–2015	Succeeded by Maura Healey
Party political offices
Preceded by Thomas Reilly	Democratic nominee for Attorney General of Massachusetts; 2006, 2010	Succeeded by Maura Healey
Preceded by Ted Kennedy	Democratic nominee for U.S. Senator from Massachusetts (Class 1); 2010	Succeeded by Elizabeth Warren
Preceded by Deval Patrick	Democratic nominee for Governor of Massachusetts; 2014	Succeeded by Jay Gonzalez
