= Jane Swift =

American politician (born 1965)

- Swift in 2001

Acting Governor of Massachusetts
- In office April 10, 2001 – January 2, 2003
- Lieutenant: Herself
- Preceded by: Paul Cellucci
- Succeeded by: Mitt Romney

69th Lieutenant Governor of Massachusetts
- In office January 7, 1999 – January 2, 2003
- Governor: Paul Cellucci; Herself (acting)
- Preceded by: Paul Cellucci
- Succeeded by: Kerry Healey

Secretary of Consumer Affairs of Massachusetts
- In office July 29, 1997 – February 5, 1998
- Governor: Paul Cellucci
- Preceded by: Michael T. Duffy
- Succeeded by: Daniel Grabauskas

Member of the Massachusetts Senate
- In office January 3, 1991 – January 3, 1997
- Preceded by: Peter C. Webber
- Succeeded by: Andrea Nuciforo
- Constituency: Berkshire (1991–93); Berkshire, Hampden, Hampshire and Franklin (1993–97)

Personal details
- Born: Jane Maria Swift; February 24, 1965 (age 61) North Adams, Massachusetts, U.S.
- Party: Republican
- Spouse: Chuck Hunt (m. 1994; died 2021)
- Children: 3
- Education: Trinity College (BA)

Jane Maria Swift (born February 24, 1965) is an American politician and nonprofit executive who served as the 69th lieutenant governor of Massachusetts from 1999 to 2003 and, concurrently, as acting governor from April 2001 to January 2003. (Note: The Massachusetts Constitution does not use the term "acting governor", but the practice in Massachusetts has been that the lieutenant governor retains their position and title as "lieutenant governor" and becomes acting governor, not governor. The lieutenant governor, when acting as governor, is referred to as "the lieutenant-governor, acting governor" in some official documents, but in everyday use may be referred to as simply "the governor," and ceremonially as "Her Excellency.") She was the first woman to perform the duties of governor of Massachusetts. At the time she became acting governor, Swift was 36 years old, making her the youngest female governor in U.S. history.

== Early life and education ==
Swift grew up in a large extended family in North Adams, Massachusetts. Her maternal grandmother immigrated to the United States from northern Italy after World War I, and her paternal grandfather was a Plymouth, Massachusetts native with roots in Ireland as well as on the Mayflower. She learned politics from her father, Jack Swift, who ran the family HVAC business and was active in the Berkshire County Republican Party. Swift's mother, a graduate of North Adams State College, was a teacher in area public and parochial schools. Swift attended North Adams public schools, and in 1987 graduated from Trinity College in Hartford, Connecticut, with a degree in American studies. During her college years, Swift held work-study jobs in the college dining hall and with the Religion & Philosophy Department, played on the women's rugby team, and was a member of the Kappa Kappa Gamma sorority.

== Career ==
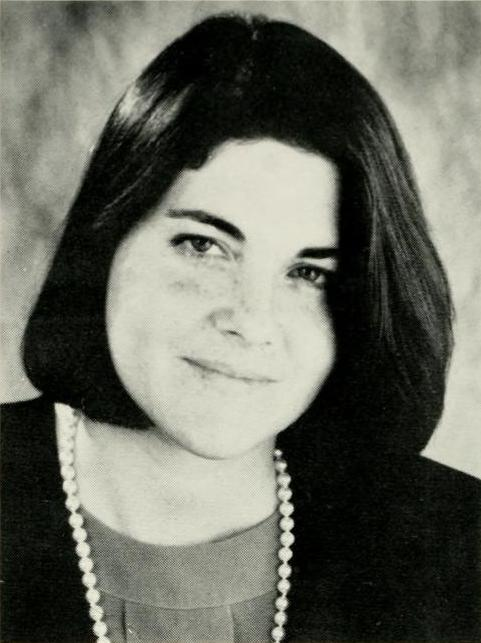
Swift as a State Senator in 1991

In 1990, at the age of 25, Swift was the youngest woman ever elected to the Massachusetts Senate. She served the Berkshire, Hampshire, Franklin, and Hampden Massachusetts Senate district from 1991 to 1997 and was active in education reform. She was instrumental in the passage of the Education Reform Act of 1993, which created the Massachusetts Comprehensive Assessment System, one of the nation's first statewide programs for quantifying academic performance.

According to Governor Bill Weld's chief of staff, "She was among the best, if not the best of senators." It was in this capacity that she developed political themes of increased accountability, smaller government, fiscal responsibility, and reforming education and social services.

In 1996, rather than seek re-election to the Senate, Swift was the Republican nominee for United States Congress in Massachusetts's 1st congressional district. She lost to a popular two-term incumbent Democratic Congressman, John Olver, by four points.

Swift went on to serve as an executive with the Massachusetts Port Authority, and was later appointed by Governor Weld as Massachusetts' consumer affairs secretary in 1997. She served in that post until she was elected lieutenant governor in 1998, in a campaign that was notable not only for her relative youth but also for the fact that she was pregnant with her first child, Elizabeth, whom she gave birth to just a few weeks before election day.

During her time as lieutenant governor, Swift faced significant scrutiny for her choices as a high-profile working mother. She was especially criticized for using staff members to watch her daughter, and for her Massachusetts State Police detail's use of a helicopter to avoid Thanksgiving traffic en route to her home in The Berkshires when her baby was sick. In an ethics ruling that Swift herself requested, she was found to be in violation of state guidelines for the babysitting and she paid a fine of $1250, but she was cleared of wrongdoing on the question of the use of the helicopter and on allegations that staffers helped her move from one Boston-area apartment to another. Twenty years later, Boston reporter Joanna Weiss reflected on the gender bias that faced Swift throughout her tenure.

=== Tenure as governor ===
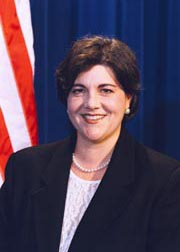
gubernatorial portrait photo

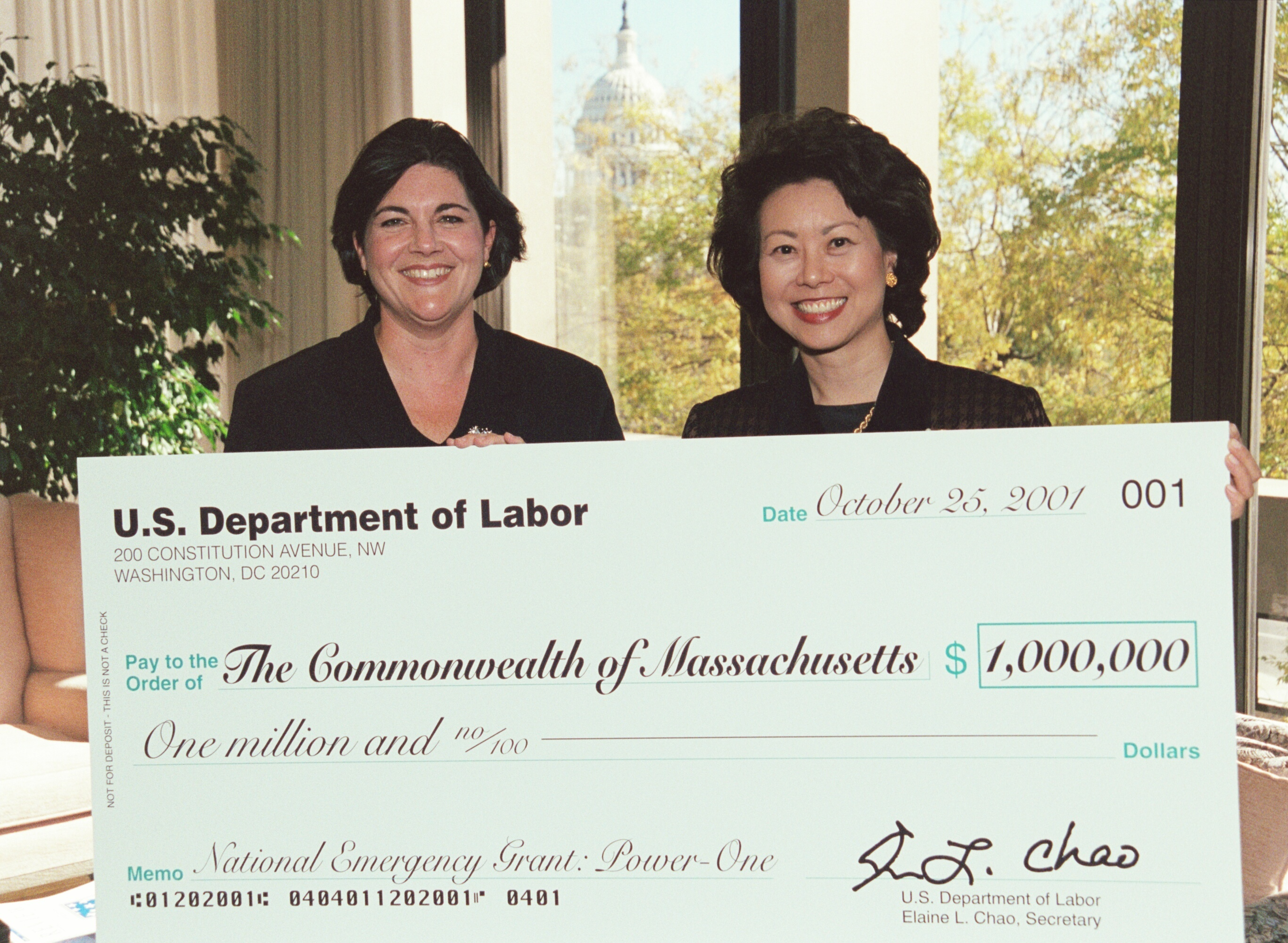
Swift (left) with Secretary of Labor Elaine Chao in October 2001

Swift became acting governor of Massachusetts in April 2001 when Governor Paul Cellucci was appointed United States Ambassador to Canada by President George W. Bush. In Massachusetts, a vacancy in the governor's office is filled by the lieutenant governor, who serves as acting governor without formally taking on the office. She was pregnant with twins at the time, and became the first sitting governor in U.S. history to give birth when her twin daughters, Lauren and Sarah Hunt, were born one month into her term of office. She made national headlines when she continued to exercise executive authority during her maternity leave, including chairing a meeting of the Massachusetts Governor's Council by teleconference while on bed rest for preterm labor. Members of the Democratic-controlled Governor's Council objected, contesting her authority to convene official meetings while on leave.

Swift won widespread praise for her response to the September 11 attacks in 2001 and for her management of the fiscal crisis that followed in Massachusetts. On the day of the attacks, Swift insisted that polls remain open for a special congressional primary election scheduled for that day, and later led a comprehensive, statewide response to prevent further acts of terrorism. In addition, Swift led 45 governors in urging Congress to create the Department of Homeland Security. The Boston Herald summarized her response to the crisis, stating, "Acting Gov. Jane Swift has had her finest hour during this crisis...she has been steady, stable, calming, decisive." After it was learned that some hijackers boarded planes at Logan International Airport in Boston, Swift came under political pressure and forced the CEO of Massport to resign.

Faced with a widening budget deficit in the aftermath of the attacks, Swift cut nearly $300 million in programs and vetoed nearly $600 million in proposed spending. She received high praise from the Massachusetts High Tech Council for her response to the budget crisis without resorting to massive tax increases.

Her tenure as acting governor was not without controversy. In February 2002, she drew criticism for her refusal to commute the thirty-to-forty-year sentence of Gerald Amirault, who was convicted in the 1986 Fells Acres day care sexual abuse trial and who had already served 16 years in prison. Her decision, which went against the unanimous recommendation of the state parole board, came at the urging of Martha Coakley, then Middlesex County District Attorney and subsequently State Attorney General. Both Coakley's and Swift's motives in denying Amirault clemency have been impugned as politically inspired.

Swift received a grade of B in 2002 for her fiscal policies from the Cato Institute, a libertarian think tank, in their biennial Fiscal Policy Report Card on America's Governors.

==== Cabinet and administration ====
The Swift Cabinet
OFFICE	NAME	TERM
Governor	Jane M. Swift	2001–2003
Lieutenant Governor	Jane M. Swift	2001–2003
Secretary of Transportation	James Scanlan	2001–2003
Director of Housing & Community Development	Jane Wallis Gumble	2001–2003
Secretary of Environmental Affairs	Robert Durand	2001–2003
Director of Consumer Affairs	Jennifer Davis Carey	2001–2003
Secretary of Health and Human Services	Robert Gittens; Ronald Preston	2001–2002; 2002–2003
Secretary of Elder Affairs	Lillian Glickman	2001–2003
Director of Labor & Workforce Development	Angelo R. Buonopane	2001–2003
Secretary of Administration & Finance	Stephen Crosby; Kevin J. Sullivan	2001–2002; 2002–2003
Secretary of Public Safety	Jane Perlov; James P. Jajuga	2001–2001; 2001–2003

==== 2002 gubernatorial campaign ====
In October 2001, Swift announced that she would run for a full term as governor in the 2002 election. In January 2002 she named Patrick Guerriero, her deputy chief of staff, as her running mate. Guerriero became the nation's first openly gay candidate for lieutenant governor.

Despite her widely praised response to the September 11 attacks, Swift's popularity was damaged by political missteps and personal controversies. Many Republicans viewed her as unable to win a general election against a Democrat and campaigned to persuade businessman Mitt Romney to run for governor. On March 17, a Boston Herald poll showed Romney defeating Swift in a Republican primary by a 75 percent to 12 percent margin. On March 19, 2002, Swift declared that she had decided not to seek her party's nomination, citing family reasons and also saying, "I believe that this is in the best interest of our state, as it will allow the Republican Party's best chances of holding the governor's office in November." Three hours later, Romney announced his candidacy and he went on to defeat Democrat Shannon O'Brien in the general election.

Swift's official portrait was unveiled in the Massachusetts State House in 2005.

==== Involvement in 2008 presidential campaign ====
A skilled campaigner and fundraiser, Swift continued to be considered a "power player" within the Republican Party. She endorsed Senator John McCain for president in February 2007 and campaigned on his behalf throughout 2008. Swift appeared on news and political commentary shows, providing point/counterpoint discussion on the campaign. Swift also decried sexist criticism of vice-presidential nominee Sarah Palin.

=== Post-political life and work ===
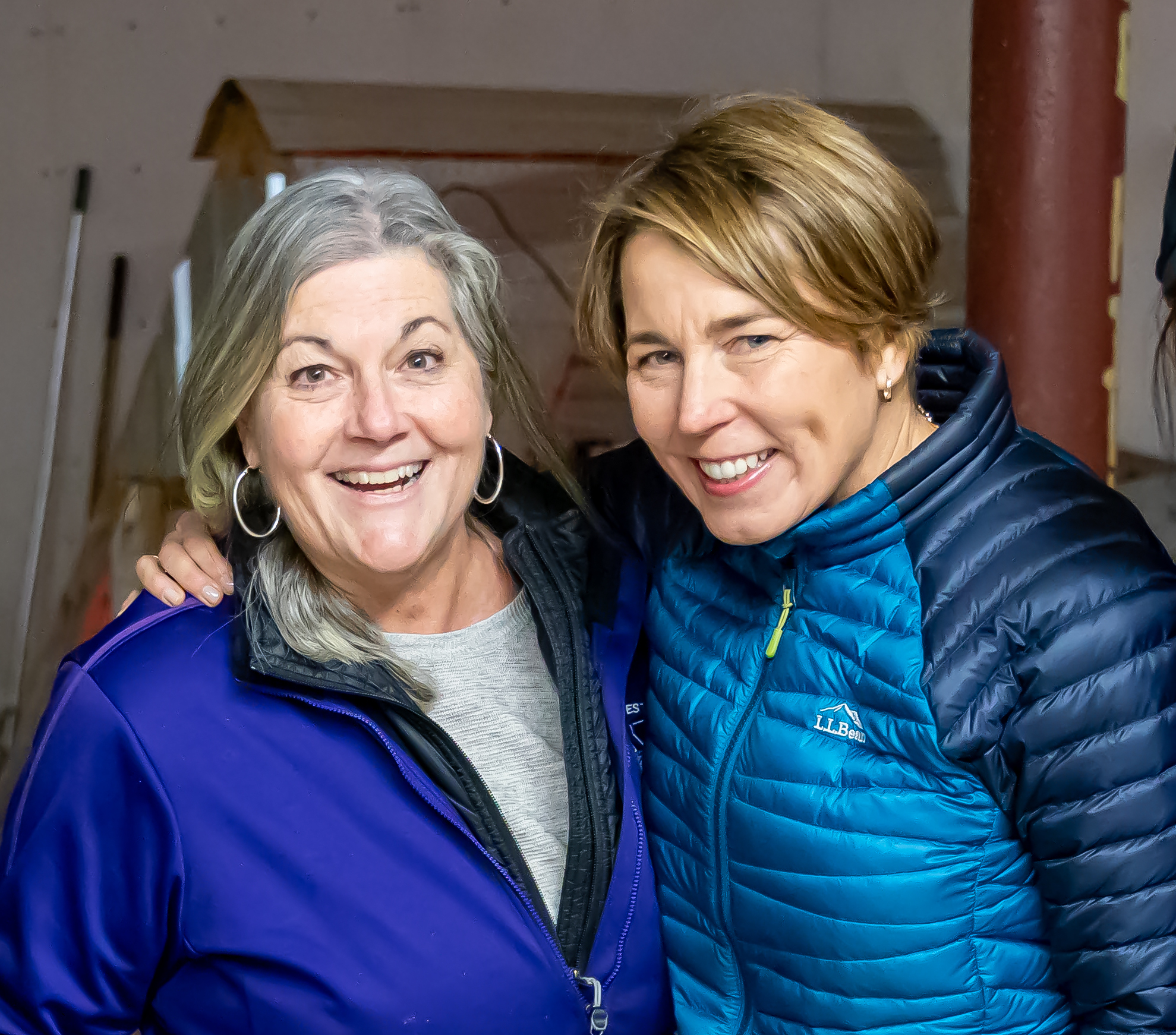
Swift (left) with Governor Maura Healey in 2023

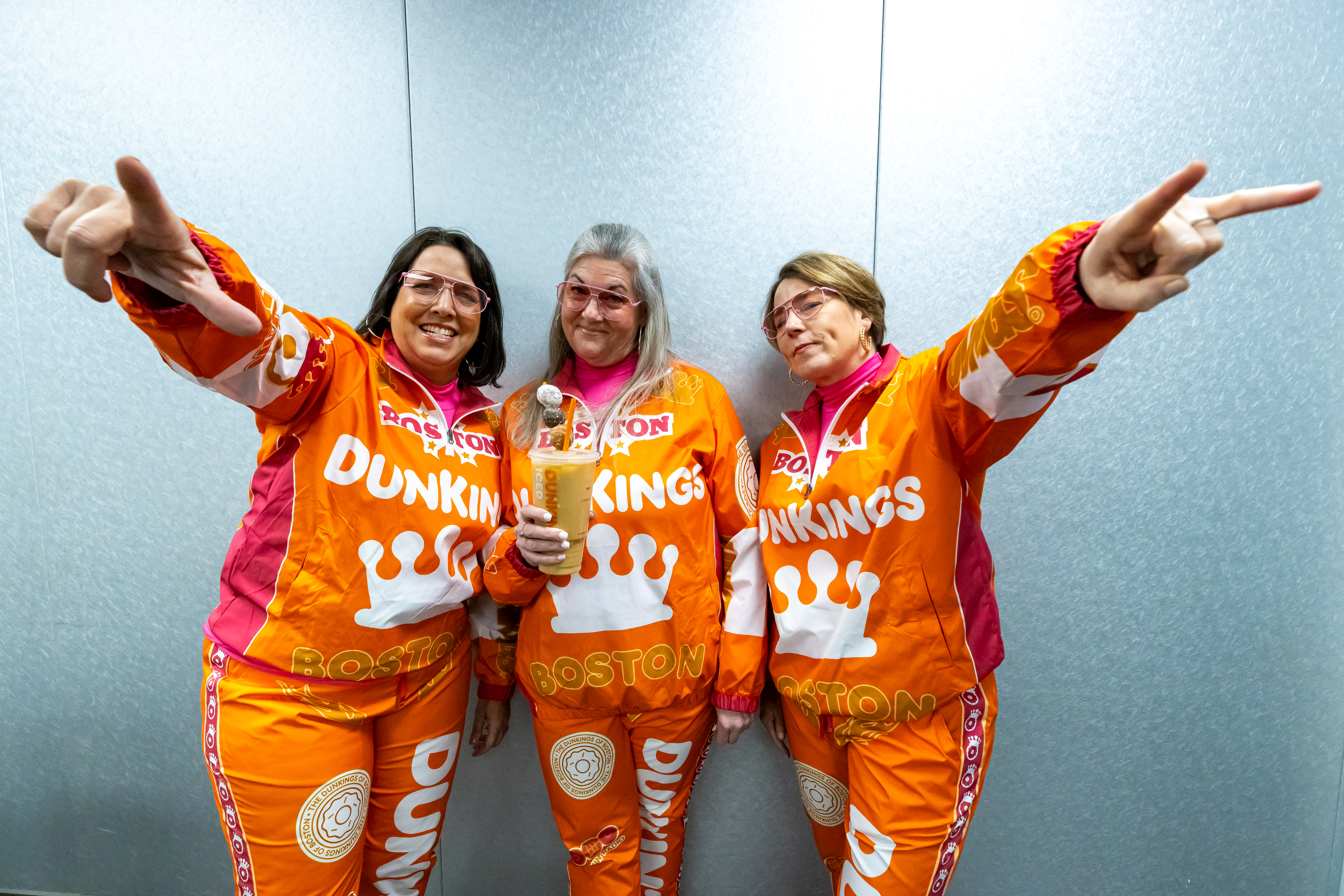
Swift (center) in 2024, dressed-up for a Dunkin'-related skit at the South Boston St. Patrick's Day Breakfast with Lieutenant Governor Kim Driscoll (left) and Governor Maura Healey (right)

After leaving public office, Swift moved back to the Berkshires while continuing to work in Boston and throughout the U.S. as an education executive, consultant and venture capital partner with special expertise in education technology. She has received six honorary doctorates, served as a fellow at Harvard University's John F. Kennedy School of Government, is a frequent speaker on the role of women in public service and the challenges of integrating work and family, is a contributor to Working Mother Magazine, and was a lecturer in Leadership Studies at Williams College. Swift and her husband owned and operated Cobble Hill Farm, a horse boarding facility and riding school in Williamstown, Massachusetts, where they lived with their three daughters before relocating to Vermont.

Swift became CEO of Middlebury Interactive Languages (MIL) from August 2011 until April 2017.

On July 1, 2019 Swift became the president and executive director of LearnLaunch, a nonprofit education innovation organization.

Today, Swift is the President of Education at Work. She continues to serve on public and private sector boards.

The former governor's philanthropic work has focused on issues of importance to women and girls. She has held trustee positions, board memberships, and advisory roles both domestically and abroad, for organizations including:

- Sally Ride Science
- School of Leadership – Afghanistan
- Oxfam America's Sisters on the Planet VoteRunLead
- Champlain College

Swift completed the Boston Marathon in 2008, running as part of the fundraising team for Boston Children's Hospital.

In 2015, Swift signed an amicus brief to the United States Supreme Court in favor of legalizing same-sex marriage.

== Personal life ==
In 1994, Swift, aged 29, married Chuck Hunt, a dairy farmer and physical education teacher. Swift and Hunt have three daughters, two of whom were born during her tenure as acting governor, thus making her the first sitting governor to give birth while in office. Her eldest daughter, Elizabeth Hunt, is a 2017 graduate of Vermont's Rice Memorial High School in Burlington and a December 2021 graduate with a B.S. in Math from the University of Massachusetts, Amherst, while her other two daughters, Lauren and Sarah, graduated from Burr and Burton Academy in Manchester, Vermont, in 2019. Swift's husband, who became the first First Gentleman in Massachusetts history, died on December 21, 2021, from kidney disease.

== Electoral history ==
- 1990 race for Massachusetts Senate, Berkshire District
  - Jane Swift (R), 52%
  - Sherwood Guernsey (D), 48%
- 1992 race for Massachusetts Senate, Berkshire, Hampden, Hampshire, and Franklin District
  - Jane Swift (R), 61%
  - Thomas Stokes (D), 39%
- 1994 race for Massachusetts Senate, Berkshire, Hampden, Hampshire, and Franklin District
  - Jane Swift (R), 100%
- 1996 race for United States House of Representatives, Massachusetts District 1
  - John Olver (D, incumbent), 53%
  - Jane Swift (R), 47%
- 1998 race for Lieutenant Governor of Massachusetts
  - Paul Cellucci (incumbent)/Jane Swift (R), 51%
  - Scott Harshbarger/Warren Tolman (D), 47%

== See also ==
- List of female governors in the United States
- List of female lieutenant governors in the United States

== Notes ==
Party political offices
Preceded by Paul Cellucci	Republican nominee for Lieutenant Governor of Massachusetts; 1998	Succeeded by Kerry Healey
Political offices
Preceded by Paul Cellucci	Lieutenant Governor of Massachusetts; 1999–2003	Succeeded by Kerry Healey
Preceded by Paul Cellucci	Governor of Massachusetts; Acting; 2001–2003	Succeeded by Mitt Romney
