= Larry Frisoli =

American politician (1950–2008)

Larry Frisoli (August 22, 1950 – July 2, 2008) was the Republican Party candidate for Attorney General in Massachusetts in 2006.

Frisoli, who was born in Cambridge, Massachusetts and was a Boston University and Suffolk University Law School graduate, was Vice-Mayor of Cambridge and Assistant District Attorney for Norfolk County. He was also elected "Lawyer of the Year" by Massachusetts Lawyers Weekly. He lost to Martha Coakley for Massachusetts Attorney General, a position previously held by Thomas Reilly.

Party political offices
Vacant Title last held by Brad Bailey	Republican nominee for Attorney General of Massachusetts; 2006	Succeeded by Jim McKenna
