= Andrew Stroukoff =

American ice dancer

Personal information
- Full name: Andrew George Stroukoff
- Born: April 27, 1950 (age 76) Trenton, New Jersey

Figure skating career
- Country: United States
- Partner: Susan Kelley
- Skating club: Skating Club of Boston

Andrew George "Andy" Stroukoff (born April 27, 1950) is an American former competitive ice dancer. With partner Susan Kelley, he represented the United States at the 1976 Winter Olympics, where they placed 17th. They represented the Skating Club of Boston

Following his retirement from skating, he became a coach. Among his current and former students are Cathy Reed & Chris Reed and Maia Shibutani & Alex Shibutani. He currently teaches figure skating as well as conditioning and training for power skating and hockey skating at the William G. Mennen Sports Arena in Morris Township, New Jersey.

== Competitive highlights ==
(with Kelley)

Event	1974	1975	1976	1977	1978
Winter Olympic Games			17th		
World Championships			18th	12th	
U.S. Championships	6th		3rd	2nd	3rd
