= Gerald Amirault =

American convicted of child sexual abuse (born 1954)

- Born: Gerald A. Amirault; March 1, 1954 (age 72); United States
- Other name: Tooky
- Occupation: Child care provider
- Spouse: Patricia Amirault (m. 1977)
- Children: 3
- Status: Released on parole (2004)
- Convictions: Rape and abuse of a child (1986, 8 counts); Indecent assault and battery on a child under 14 years of age (1986, 7 counts)
- Trial: Fells Acres day care sexual abuse trial
- Penalty: 30–40 years in state prison

Gerald A. "Tooky" Amirault (born March 1, 1954) is an American convicted in 1986 of child sexual abuse of eight children at the Fells Acres Day School in Malden, Massachusetts, run by his family. He and his family deny the charges, which supporters regard as a conspicuous example of day-care sex-abuse hysteria. Amirault was released from prison on parole on April 30, 2004.

== Accusations and trial ==
Amirault was arrested in September 1984 on charges of sexually abusing a child at his family's day care facility, which promptly had its license to operate suspended by the state of Massachusetts. His mother and sister, Violet Amirault and Cheryl Amirault LeFave, respectively, were also later arrested.

At Amirault's 1986 trial, the prosecution relied heavily on testimony from young children extracted through long sessions with therapists. Amirault was convicted of assaulting and raping nine children and sentenced to 30 to 40 years in prison. In 1987, in a separate trial, his mother and sister were convicted of similar crimes against four children and sentenced to jail for eight to 20 years.

=== Criticism ===
The Amiraults insist they were victims of the day-care sex-abuse hysteria that swept the US in the 1980s.

Dorothy Rabinowitz, a member of the Editorial Board of The Wall Street Journal, asserts that Amirault was railroaded. She wrote that "Other than such testimony, the prosecutors had no shred of physical or other proof that could remotely pass as evidence of abuse". Among the accusations were, as summarized by Rabinowitz from court records, Amirault

had plunged a wide-blade butcher knife into the rectum of a 4-year-old boy, which he then had trouble removing. When a teacher in the school saw him in action with the knife, she asked him what he was doing, and then told him not to do it again, a child said. On this testimony, Gerald was convicted of a rape which had, miraculously, left no mark or other injury.

Rabinowitz was awarded the Pulitzer Prize for Commentary in 2001, partly for her coverage of the case. The case was also the major topic of her book about miscarriages of justice, No Crueler Tyrannies.

== Post-trial ==
In 1995, Judge Robert Barton ordered a new trial for Violet, then 72, and Cheryl, who both had been imprisoned eight years. He ordered the women released at once and expressed his contempt for the prosecutors. Barton found that their convictions were wrongful because they were not able to directly confront their accusers. A similar appeal on behalf of Gerald was denied later that year.

In 1997, Superior Court Judge Isaac Borenstein presided over a widely publicized hearing into the case resulting in findings that all the children's testimony was tainted. He said that "Every trick in the book had been used to get the children to say what the investigators wanted." Massachusetts Lawyers Weekly published a scathing editorial in September 1999 directed at the prosecutors "who seemed unwilling to admit they might have sent innocent people to jail for crimes that had never occurred." Violet died in 1997. Cheryl's conviction was ultimately upheld, but she avoided returning to prison by reaching a deal with prosecutors in October 1999.

In 2000, the Massachusetts Governor's Board of Pardons and Paroles met to consider a commutation of Gerald Amirault's sentence. After nine months of investigation, the board voted 5–0, with one abstention, to commute his sentence, although no exculpatory evidence was presented. Also newsworthy was an added statement, signed by a majority of the board, which pointed to the lack of evidence against the Amiraults, and the "extraordinary if not bizarre allegations" on which they had been convicted.

In 2002, then–Acting Governor of Massachusetts Jane Swift refused to commute Amirault's sentence, despite a unanimous vote in favor of his release by the state's parole board. Amirault's case had previously been upheld by the Massachusetts Supreme Judicial Court. Martha Coakley, then Middlesex County district attorney and subsequently Massachusetts Attorney General, lobbied Swift to keep him in prison. Swift denied Amirault's clemency.

Amirault was ultimately released on parole from the Bay State Correctional Center on April 30, 2004, 18 years after his conviction. Accusers criticized his early release.

Massachusetts Governor Charlie Baker recommended Gerald Amirault and his sister Cheryl Amirault LeFave for pardon on November 18, 2022, subject to approval by the Massachusetts Governor's Council. The pardon recommendation was withdrawn by Baker on December 14, 2022, as "there didn’t appear to be enough support" within the council.
