= St. Joseph's School (North Adams, Massachusetts) =

- U.S. National Register of Historic Places
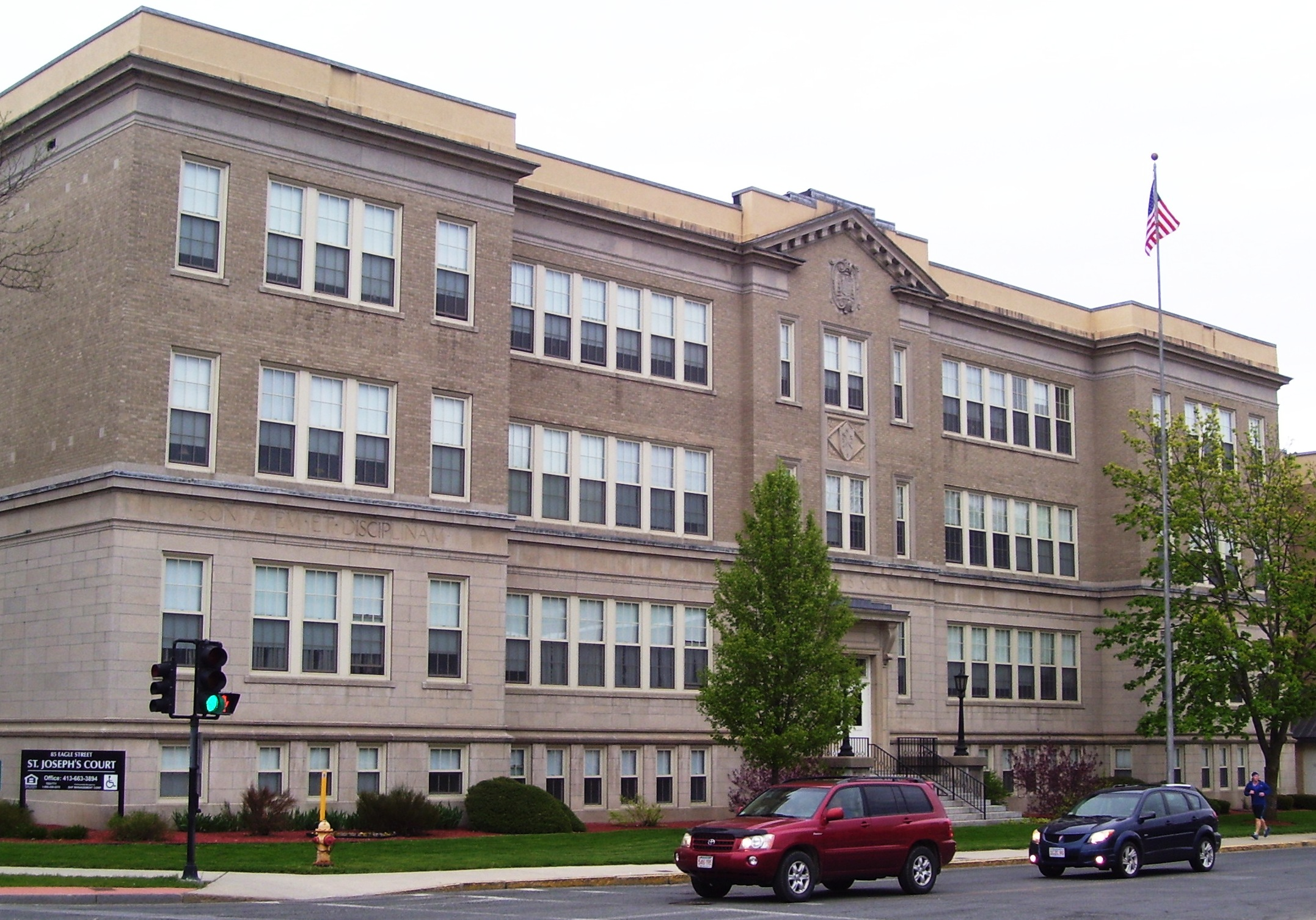
- (2012)

- Location within Massachusetts Location within the United States
- Location: 85 Eagle St., North Adams, Massachusetts
- Coordinates: 42°42′04″N 73°06′31″W
- Area: 1.3 acres (0.53 ha)
- Built: 1928
- Architectural style: Classical Revival
- MPS: North Adams MRA
- NRHP reference No.: 83003928
- Added to NRHP: December 22, 1983

St. Joseph's School is a historic former school building located at 85 Eagle Street at the intersection of Union Street in North Adams, Massachusetts. It is a 3 1/2-story brick Classical Revival structure, built, in 1928–29 as an expansion of an older building. It was operated by the Roman Catholic Diocese of Springfield, and reached a peak enrollment over 1,200 students in 1958. The building was added to the National Register of Historic Places in 1983. It is now called St. Joseph's Court and is used for federally subsidized low-income housing for senior citizens.

== Description and history ==
The former St. Joseph's is located just north of downtown North Adams, occupying most of a city block on the west side Eagle Street, between Mohawk Trail and Sperry Avenue. It is a 3 1/2-story masonry structure, built out of concrete blocks and bricks. The basement and ground floor are built using concrete blocks textured with marble chips, and the upper floors are faced in light-colored brick. The first and second floors are separated by a frieze and a projecting concrete belt course. The building is organized with a central horizontal section whose ends are capped by slightly projecting wings, with a central entry section that also projects slightly, and is capped by a gabled parapet. Interior features that have been retained include patterned marble tile floors, oak paneling and trim on the first floor, and oak and pine trim on the upper floors.

The first large influx of Catholics into North Adams were Irish immigrants, who began to arrive in the 1840s. A Roman Catholic parish (St. Francis) was established in 1868, and the call for a parochial school began in 1878, after North Adams separated from Adams. The first St. Joseph's, an Italianate building, was completed in 1886. That building served as an adjunct to this one in the 20th century, and was demolished in 1981. The present building was built in 1928–29 to add capacity to the school. The building is architecture a rare example of Classical Revival in North Adams, and served as a school until the 1970s, when it closed due to declining enrollment. In the 1980s it was adapted as a senior living facility, with a modern addition appended to the north end.

== See also ==
- National Register of Historic Places listings in Berkshire County, Massachusetts
