= Susan Kelley (figure skater) =

American ice dancer

Personal information
- Full name: Susan Marie Kelley
- Born: November 1, 1954 (age 71) Needham, Massachusetts

Figure skating career
- Country: United States
- Partner: Andrew Stroukoff
- Skating club: Skating Club of Boston

Susan Marie "Susie" Kelley (born November 1, 1954, in Needham, Massachusetts) is an American ice dancer. With partner Andrew Stroukoff, she represented the United States at the 1976 Winter Olympics, where they placed 17th. They represented the Skating Club of Boston

Following her retirement from skating, she became a coach. Among her current and former students are Cathy Reed & Chris Reed and Maia Shibutani & Alex Shibutani.

== Competitive highlights ==
(with Stroukoff)

Event	1974	1975	1976	1977	1978
Winter Olympic Games			17th		
World Championships			18th	12th	
U.S. Championships	6th		3rd	2nd	3rd
