= Susan J. Kelley =

Susan J. Kelley, Ph.D.
- Education: Boston College; Boston University
- Known for: Fells Acres day care sexual abuse trial
- Awards: ICSA's John G. Clark Award for Distinguished Scholarship in Cultic Studies; American Journal of Nursing Book of the Year Award
- Scientific career
- Fields: psychology, child abuse, nursing
- Workplaces: Georgia State University

Susan J. Kelley is the former Dean of the College of Health and Human Sciences at Georgia State University. She is also currently a professor of Nursing and the Director of the National Center on Grandparents Raising Grandchildren, and founder and director of Project Healthy Grandparents, at Georgia State University.

== Education ==
Kelley received her Bachelor of Science in Nursing from Boston University, 1977, followed by a Master of Science in Nursing in 1982. She was awarded a Ph.D. in developmental psychology from Boston College in 1988.

== Career ==
Prior to her current positions, Kelley had previously served as chairperson and Professor, Department of Maternal-Child Health Nursing at Boston College. She was also the Director of Nursing education at Massachusetts Emergency Medical Services and a pediatric nurse at Columbia Presbyterian Hospital, and Boston City Hospital. She has also served as a guest lecturer at George Mason University.

In 2000, Kelley served on the Task Force for International Child Health Nursing Alliance. She is a reviewer for the academic journal Nursing Research, as part of their peer review process.

== Child abuse prevention ==
Kelley has specialized in the field of child abuse, since 1979 and has appeared as a featured expert on child abuse on national programs including the Today Show, NBC Evening News and CBS Morning News.

=== Criticism ===
As a pediatric nurse in the 1980s, Kelley interviewed many of the children involved in the Fells Acres day care sexual abuse trial in Malden, Massachusetts. Kelley's interview techniques in that case were later criticized—they were called “improper” and “biased” by a Massachusetts appellate judge, after video tapes of her questioning of the children were played in court during the appeal of one of the defendants.

== Awards and honors ==
- ICSA's John G. Clark Award for Distinguished Scholarship in Cultic Studies
- American Journal of Nursing Book of the Year Award
- March of Dimes National Nurse of the Year Award
- American Nurses' Association Nurse of the Year Award
- Excellence in Research Award, Society of Pediatric Nursing
- Outstanding Service Award, American Professional Society on the Abuse of Children
- Fellow of the American Academy of Nursing

== Professional associations ==
- Former President, Georgia Professional Society on the Abuse of Children
- Member, Advisory Board, American Professional Society on the Abuse of Children (APSAC)
- Member, Board of Directors, Georgia Council on Child Abuse
- Member, Board of Directors, Pediatric Services of America, Inc. (Nasdaq: PSAI)
- Member, editorial boards:
  - Child Maltreatment
  - Journal of Child Sexual Abuse
  - Trauma, Violence and Abuse: A Review Journal

== Publications ==
=== Books ===
- Pediatric Emergency Nursing, published by Appleton & Lange, April 2, 1995, ISBN 0-8385-7705-9, ISBN 978-0-8385-7705-9
- Recovery from Cults: Help for Victims of Psychological and Spiritual Abuse, Contributor, 1995

=== Articles ===
- Ritualistic Abuse of Children: Dynamics and Impact, Cultic Studies Journal, Vol. 5, No. 2
- "Grandmothers raising grandchildren: Are they at increased risk of health problems?", Health & Social Work , Volume: 26 Issue: 2 Page: 105–114, May 31, 2001
- "A multimodal intervention for grandparents raising grandchildren: Results of an exploratory study", Child Welfare , Volume: 80 Issue: 1 Page: 27–50, February 28, 2001

== See also ==
- List of psychologists
- Day care sex abuse hysteria
