= Dorothy Rabinowitz =

American journalist

- Born: New York City, U.S.
- Education: Queens College, City University of New York; New York University
- Occupations: Journalist; commentator
- Awards: Pulitzer Prize for Commentary (2001)

Dorothy Rabinowitz is a Pulitzer Prize winning American journalist and commentator.

She was born in New York City, and attained a bachelor's degree at Queens College. She worked toward a doctorate at New York University from 1957 to 1960, but did not graduate. She has worked as editorial writer for the Wall Street Journal since June 1990 and has been a member of their editorial board since May 1996. She is a regular panelist on the Journal Editorial Report.

== Pulitzer Prize ==
Rabinowitz was awarded the 2001 Pulitzer Prize for Commentary for a series of articles published in 2000 covering aspects of U.S. social and cultural trends. Previously, she had been nominated for the Pulitzer Prize three times, but in 2001 "she was not a finalist [but]... the Pulitzer board, which makes the final decisions, reviewed the jury's original three finalists and decided it wanted 'a broader choice.' The jury offered Ms. Rabinowitz as an alternate selection.". "[A]mong the ten articles cited by the board were five articles challenging questionable allegations of sexual abuse. Four of the cited articles commented on the 2000 U.S. presidential election and the remaining article discussed Rudolph Giuliani's recommending a pardon for Michael Milken."

She was previously nominated in 1996 for the Pulitzer Prize for Commentary "For her columns effectively challenging key cases of alleged child abuse" and had been nominated for the Pulitzer Prize for Criticism in 1995 "For her writing about television", and in 1998 for "her tough-minded, critical columns on television and its place in politics and culture."

No Crueler Tyrannies
- Author: Dorothy Rabinowitz
- Original title: No Crueler Tyrannies: Accusation, False Witness, and Other Terrors of Our Times
- Publisher: Free Press, NY
- Publication date: 2003
- ISBN: 0-7432-2834-0
- OCLC: 51275066
- LC Class: HV8079.C48 R33 2003

== No Crueler Tyrannies ==
External videos
- Booknotes interview with Rabinowitz on No Crueler Tyrannies: Accusation, False Witness, and Other Terrors of Our Times, May 4, 2003, C-SPAN

Rabinowitz wrote exposés of the dubious sexual abuse charges filed against the operators of day care centers and other individuals, notably that of a family named Amirault in Malden, Massachusetts and those in Wenatchee, Washington. These exposés earned her a 1996 Pulitzer nomination, formed half of the articles cited for her 2001 Pulitzer win, and were the basis of her book No Crueler Tyrannies: Accusation, False Witness, and Other Terrors of Our Times.

Her work on these cases began with the Wee Care Nursery School case, Rabinowitz told C-SPAN:

I was working as a television commentator. I was at WWOR-TV in New Jersey, doing three times a week some sort of media criticism. And ... I saw this woman in her 20s ... accused of something like 2,800 charges of child sex abuse. Oh, I thought, well, that's very odd ... I thought, How can one woman, one young, lone woman in an absolutely open place like the child care center of the church in New Jersey that she worked for—how could she have committed these enormous crimes against 20 children, dressed and undressed them and sent—you know what it is to dress and undress even one child every day without getting their socks lost?—20 children in a perfectly public place, torture them for two years, frighten and terrorize them, and they never went home and told their parents anything? ... This did seem strange.

Her work on this story led The Wall Street Journal to hire her.

== Political issues ==
In 1999, Rabinowitz wrote an editorial in The Wall Street Journal about Juanita Broaddrick, an Arkansas woman who alleged that then President Bill Clinton had raped her when he was attorney general of Arkansas. Rabinowitz wrote "To encounter this woman, to hear the details of her story and the statements of the corroborating witnesses, was to understand that this was in fact an event that took place." She also wrote approvingly of Republican presidential candidate John McCain in both the 2000 and 2008 U.S. presidential elections.

On May 31, 2013, Rabinowitz claimed the Citi Bike bicycle sharing program in New York City was "dreadful" and "totalitarian": when an interviewer asked if she understood the rationale for this program, she responded, "Do not ask me to enter the minds of the totalitarians running this government of the city." She described Mayor Michael Bloomberg as "autocratic" and "a practiced denier" and City Transportation Commissioner Janette Sadik-Khan as "ideology-maddened". She also warned that "the bike lobby is an all-powerful enterprise."

== Bibliography ==
- No Crueler Tyrannies: Accusation, False Witness, and Other Terrors of Our Times, Free Press, 2003. ISBN 0-7432-2834-0.
- About the Holocaust : what we know and how we know it, Institute of Human Relations Press, American Jewish Committee, 1979. OCLC 5829480.
- New Lives: Survivors of the Holocaust Living in America, Random House, 1976. ISBN 0-394-48573-4.
- The other Jews; portraits in poverty, Institute of Human Relations Press, American Jewish Committee, 1972. OCLC 344030.
- Home life; a story of old age, by Dorothy Rabinowitz & Yedida Nielsen, Macmillan, 1971. OCLC 138427.
