= Massachusetts Academy =

Massachusetts Academy may refer to:

- Massachusetts Maritime Academy, a regionally accredited, coeducational, state college
- Massachusetts Academy of Math and Science at WPI, an 11th and 12th grade public high school which is part of Worcester Polytechnic Institute
- Massachusetts Academy (comics), fictional home of Xavier's School for Gifted Youngsters and Generation X
- Massachusetts International Academy, a private high school owned by the government of the People's Republic of China located in Marlborough, Massachusetts
