= Mike Capuano =

American politician (born 1952)

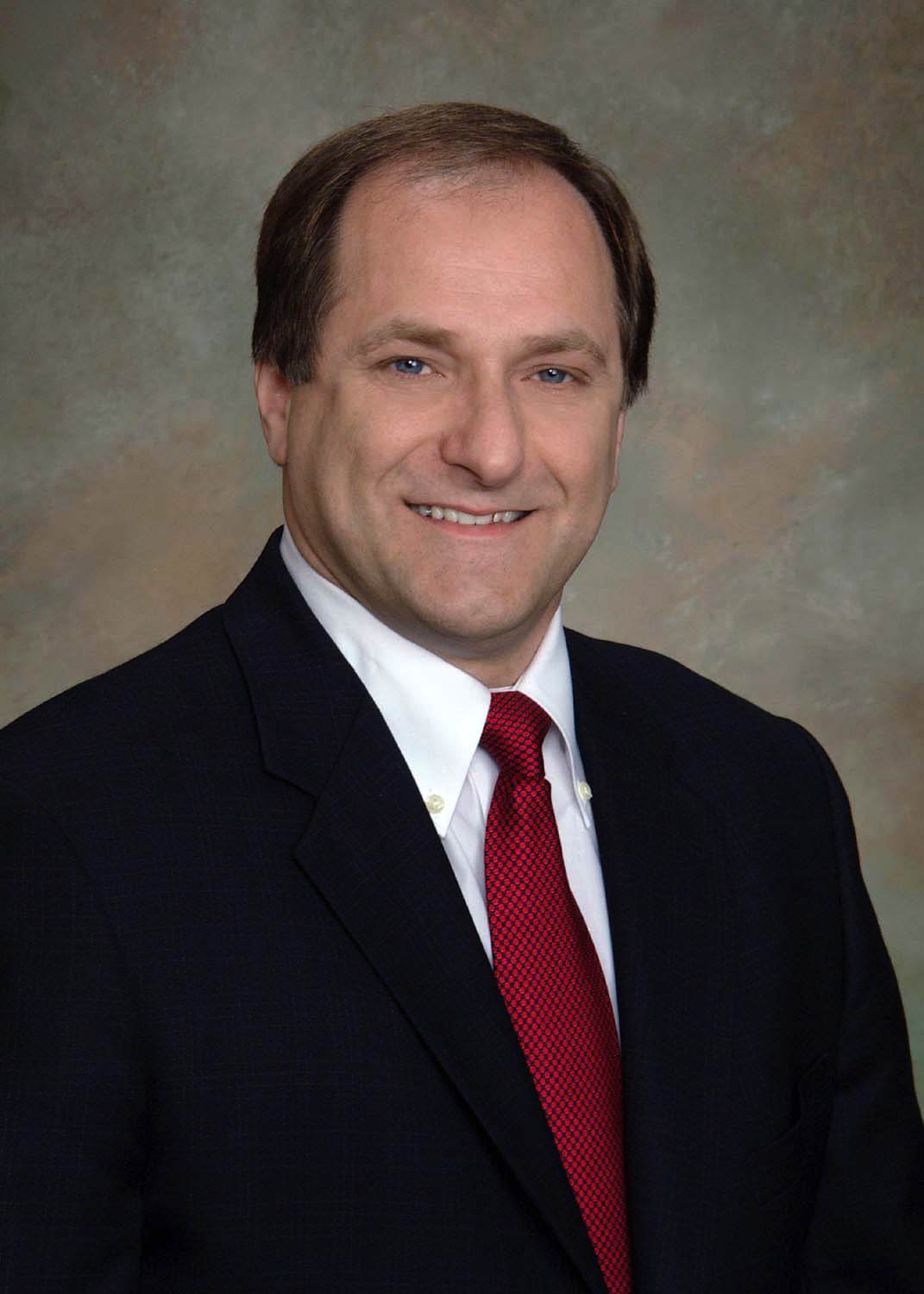

Member of the U.S. House of Representatives from Massachusetts
- In office January 3, 1999 – January 3, 2019
- Preceded by: Joseph P. Kennedy II
- Succeeded by: Ayanna Pressley
- Constituency: 8th district (1999–2013); 7th district (2013–2019)

33rd Mayor of Somerville
- In office January 1, 1990 – January 3, 1999
- Preceded by: Eugene Brune
- Succeeded by: Dorothy Kelly Gay

Personal details
- Born: Michael Everett Capuano; January 9, 1952 (age 74) Somerville, Massachusetts, U.S.
- Party: Democratic
- Spouse: Barbara Teebagy (m. 1974)
- Children: 2
- Relatives: Chris Evans (nephew); Scott Evans (nephew)
- Education: Dartmouth College (BA); Boston College (JD)
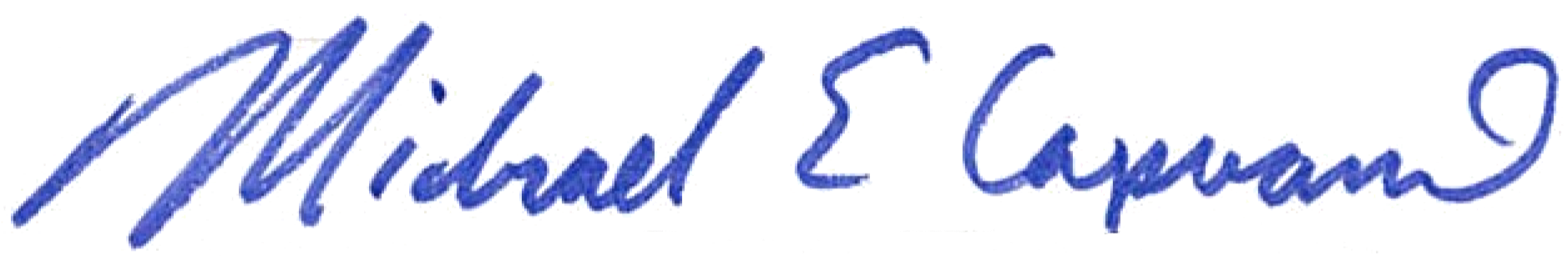
- Signature
- Website: Personal website
- Capuano's voice Capuano honoring Daniel Coughlin, the retiring House chaplain. Recorded April 21, 2010

Michael Everett Capuano (/ˌkæpjuˈɑːnoʊ/ KAP-ew-AH-noh; born January 9, 1952) is an American politician and attorney who served as a U.S. representative of Massachusetts from 1999 to 2019. A Democrat, his district included the northern three-fourths of Boston, as well as parts of Cambridge, his hometown of Somerville, and other communities immediately north and south of Boston. Prior to being elected to Congress, he served in Somerville as an alderman and the 33rd mayor.

Capuano was born and raised in Somerville. After graduating from Dartmouth College and Boston College Law School, he worked as an attorney and Somerville alderman. After losing two mayoral elections in 1979 and 1981, he worked as legal counsel for the Massachusetts General Court. In 1989 Capuano ran for mayor a third time and won, serving from 1990 to 1999.

In 1998 Capuano won a crowded Democratic primary to replace Joseph Kennedy II in Congress and was re-elected nine times. He represented the state's 8th district until it was redrawn in 2013 into the 7th district. In Congress he was a staunch liberal and member of the Congressional Progressive Caucus. He ran in the 2010 special election to fill the seat in the United States Senate made vacant by the death of Ted Kennedy, his Congressional predecessor's uncle, but lost the primary to Martha Coakley, who in turn lost the general election to Republican Scott Brown. In 2018, he was defeated by Ayanna Pressley in a House Democratic primary.

In March 2019, Capuano joined the law firm Foley & Lardner, to serve as public affairs director. The same month, he also joined Boston University to teach at the university's Initiative on Cities and help organize the program.

== Early life and education ==
Capuano was born January 9, 1952, in the Spring Hill neighborhood of Somerville, Massachusetts, the son of Rita Marie (née Garvey) (1919–2010) and Andrew Capuano (1914–1994). His father left to serve in World War II shortly after his marriage, and after returning ran for the Somerville Board of Aldermen, and became the first Italian American elected to the board. His mother was of Irish descent.

Capuano graduated from Somerville High School in 1969, and later attended Dartmouth College, where he graduated with a Bachelor of Arts in 1973. Capuano later went on to earn his Juris Doctor in 1977 from Boston College Law School, specializing in tax law.

== Early political career ==
In 1976, Capuano was elected to the Somerville Board of Aldermen representing Ward 5, once served in by his father. Capuano served one term, stepping down in 1979 to run for Mayor of Somerville. In the 1979 mayoral election he faced Eugene Brune, Paul Haley, and incumbent, Thomas August. He lost the nomination to Brune, who went on to defeat August. Capuano ran again in 1981 to challenge Brune, placing second in a three-person runoff election. Capuano promoted his opposition to the state ballot question Proposition 2½ and criticized Brune for expanding the mayoral staff in the face of tight city budgets, while Brune touted his prevention of service cuts after the proposition passed. Capuano lost in the general election with 40% of the vote.

From 1978 to 1984 Capuano served as chief legal counsel for the Massachusetts General Court's Joint Committee on Taxation. Capuano left the committee in 1984 to join the Beacon Hill law firm and lobbying group Joyce & Joyce. In 1985 he returned to the Somerville Board of Aldermen as an at-large member.

=== Mayor of Somerville ===
In 1989 Capuano ran for mayor a third time and won. Capuano served as mayor from 1990 to 1999, where he earned a reputation as a hands-on administrator. One of his priorities was to lower the city's population density, which at the time was the highest of any New England municipality, by using state grants to demolish several buildings and replace them with playgrounds and parking spaces. As mayor, Capuano oversaw the reduction of school class sizes to a maximum of 19 students.

== U.S. House of Representatives ==
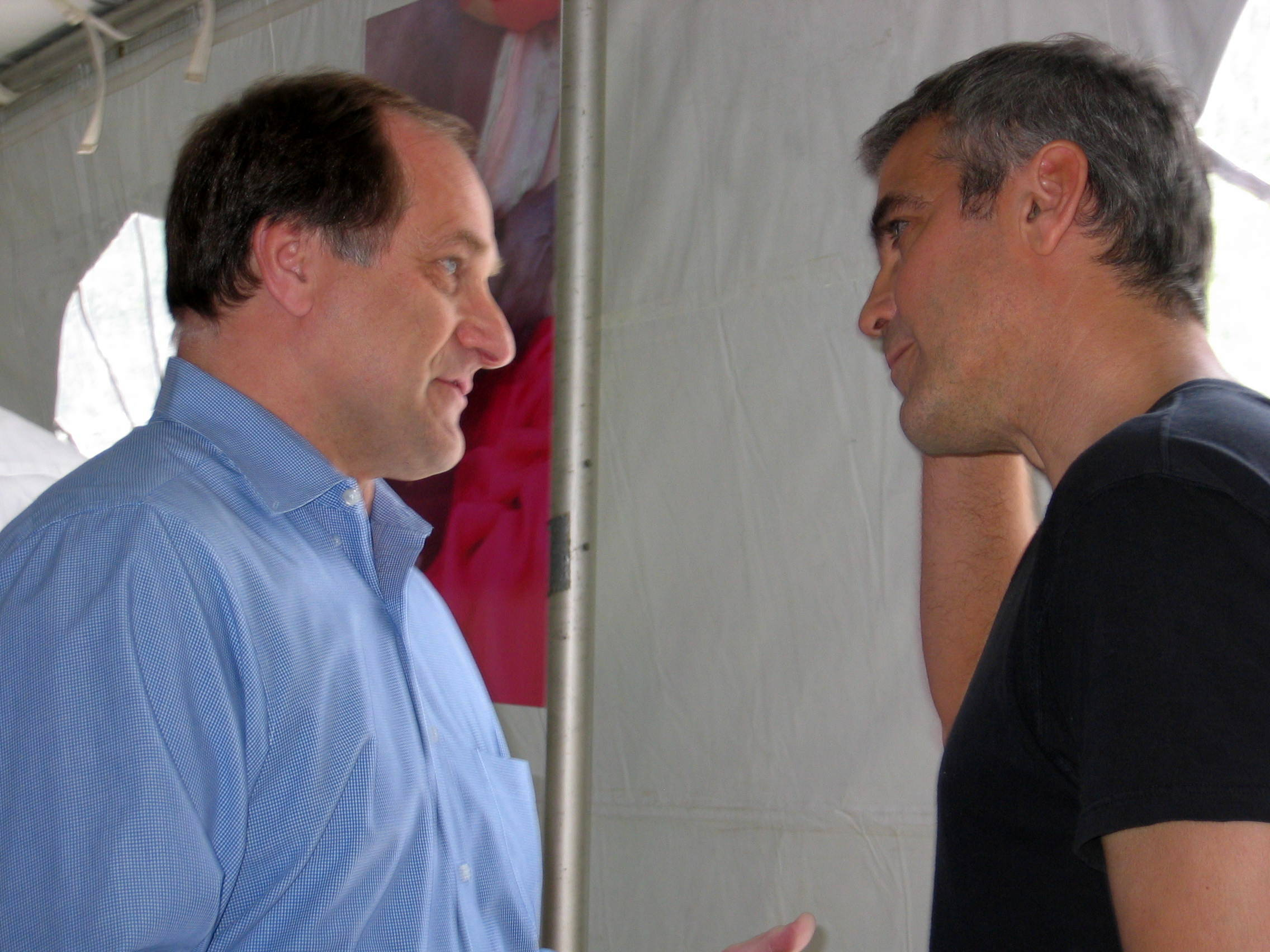
Capuano with actor George Clooney in Darfur

=== Elections ===
In 1998, Joseph Kennedy II announced his retirement after six terms in what was then the 8th District. Capuano entered a crowded 10-way Democratic primary—the real contest in this heavily Democratic district, which was once represented by John F. Kennedy and Tip O'Neill. The early front-runner was former Boston Mayor and US Vatican Ambassador Raymond Flynn. However, Capuano won the primary with 23%, largely due to large turnout in Somerville, all but assuring him of election in November. He easily won the general election in November, taking 81 percent of the vote. He was reelected nine times, never dropping below 80% of the vote in what has long been the most Democratic district in New England. Since his initial run for the seat, Capuano was unopposed in all but two reelection bids; he faced a minor-party candidate in 2006 and an independent in 2012. He faced a Republican only once, during his initial run in 1998.

==== 2018 election ====
Capuano was defeated by Boston City Councilor Ayanna Pressley in the September 4, 2018, primary election, receiving 41.3% of the vote versus Pressley's 58.5%. The Boston Globe reported that Capuano did not get the endorsement of either U.S. Senator from Massachusetts, Elizabeth Warren and Edward J. Markey, nor was he endorsed by Representatives Seth Moulton and Niki Tsongas. Capuano did receive the support of the majority of the Massachusetts federal delegation, including Representatives William Keating, Katherine Clark, James McGovern, Joseph Kennedy III, Stephen Lynch, and Richard Neal. Capuano was endorsed by Congressman John Lewis (D-GA), on March 7, 2018; Lewis described Capuano as "a champion and fierce advocate for those who have often been forgotten or left behind" and "a leader alongside those of us opposing the unfair and immoral policies of the Trump Administration." In its editorial endorsement of Pressley, the Boston Globe noted that the state Legislature had drawn the 7th district to favor minority candidates. No Republican even filed, all but assuring Pressley of being the district's next congresswoman.

=== Tenure ===
Committee assignments
115th Congress (2017–19)
- Financial Services
  - Financial Institutions and Consumer Credit
  - Housing and Insurance
  - Oversight and Investigations
- Transportation and Infrastructure
  - Aviation
  - Highways and Transit
  - Railroads, Pipelines, and Hazardous Materials (ranking member)

During his tenure, Capuano helped found five congressional caucuses, on: Community Health Centers; Empowerment Zones and Enterprise Communities; Sudan; and Korea; as well as one for former Mayors.

Capuano voted against the War in Iraq and supported immediate withdrawal of troops. In 2005 Capuano visited Iraq and met with military leaders to assess the future of the region. Capuano is considered to be one of the biggest supporters in Congress for increasing international aid funding, and has advocated bringing attention to the crisis in Sudan and helped secure funding aimed at assisting developing African nations.

Capuano is pro-choice and supports open access to abortions. In 2012 a fundraiser hosted by Pope John XXIII High School where Capuano and fellow Massachusetts Congressman Ed Markey were to receive awards was cancelled due to their "positions [being] inconsistent with church doctrine;" both were humble in response to the news. During the 2010 Senate Democratic primary Capuano criticized his opponent Martha Coakley, claiming she wouldn't have voted for the Patient Protection and Affordable Care Act with Stupak–Pitts Amendment which would have barred federal funding of abortions; which Capuano said he only did to "keep the health care debate alive." Capuano's comments were characterized by WBUR political analyst as "an empty charge against her since he has the same position as she does."

After the 2006 election that created a Democratic majority in the House, he was appointed Chairman of the Speaker's Task Force on Ethics Enforcement by Nancy Pelosi, with whom he has a close relationship. After serving as the Chairman of the Task Force on Ethics Enforcement, in 2008 Capuano introduced H.R. 895 which established the Office of Congressional Ethics. Capuano has had a long-running relationship with former Congressman Anthony Weiner, whom he shared a Washington, D.C. apartment with for 12 years. Following Weiner's sexting scandal Capuano did not call on him to resign, saying: "I am not the guy who likes to judge other people. I figure that is between them and the people who are appropriately named to do that – and that is the Ethics Committee."

Capuano is a strong supporter of labor rights and unions; in February 2011 during a rally at Beacon Hill in Boston, in support of the 2011 Wisconsin budget protests, Capuano told the crowd, "I'm proud to be here with people who understand that it's more than just sending an email to get you going. Every once and awhile you need to get out on the streets and get a little bloody when necessary". Following criticism, especially when such a statement was made just days after the attempted assassination of Gabby Giffords, Capuano expressed regret for his "choice of words."

After the 2008 financial crisis and subsequent bank bailouts, at a House Financial Services Committee hearing, Capuano berated the bank CEOs for their practices, saying at one point: "You come to us today on your bicycles after buying Girl Scout cookies and helping out Mother Teresa and telling us, 'We're sorry, we didn't mean it, we won't do it again, trust us.' Well, I have some people in my constituency that actually robbed some of your banks and they say the same thing." Capuano's speech was included in the 2010 documentary film Inside Job, described by director Charles H. Ferguson as being about "the systemic corruption of the United States by the financial services industry and the consequences of that systemic corruption."

A self-described "fiscal conservative" who opposed the Bush-era tax cuts that provided tax reductions for the wealthy because they "created a deficit for no good reason," in 2013 Capuano joined Senator Elizabeth Warren and Boston Mayor Thomas Menino in a rally against the then-upcoming sequester, with Capuano calling it "stupid." In 2012 Capuano along with fellow Massachusetts Congressman Barney Frank introduced legislation to combine the Securities and Exchange Commission and Commodity Futures Trading Commission into the "Securities and Derivatives Commission."

Capuano was a member of the Congressional Arts Caucus and the U.S.–Japan Caucus.

== Campaigns for higher office ==
=== 1994 Secretary nomination ===
Capuano ran for Massachusetts Secretary of the Commonwealth in the 1994 election, running against former State Representatives Augusto Grace and William F. Galvin for the Democratic nomination. During the race he framed himself as an advocate for the poor and urban communities, and criticized aid formulas which he argued left less-wealthy municipalities with less per-capita revenue. To appear on the Democratic primary required the support of at least 15% of delegates in the state party convention. In what the Boston Globe deemed "an embarrassing defeat," he failed to obtain the necessary delegate votes to be nominated to participate in the primary election, with only 13%. When asked why he undertook the difficult race to begin with, he responded, "Because I wasn't ready to run for Governor."

=== 2010 Senate campaign ===
After the death of incumbent Senator Ted Kennedy, a special election to succeed him was scheduled. On September 8, 2009, Capuano collected nomination papers to run for the seat and on September 18, he announced his candidacy. Capuano ran as a "Washington insider," comparing himself to Kennedy saying: "was [Kennedy] not the ultimate insider ... I think that's probably one of the best things that we share." In his campaign Capuano received several high-profile endorsements, including House Speaker Pelosi and former Massachusetts Governor and 1988 Democratic presidential nominee, Michael Dukakis.

Consistently polling below incumbent Massachusetts Attorney General, Martha Coakley, on December 8, 2009, Capuano lost the Democratic primary to Coakley, winning only 28% of the vote to Coakley's 47%, amongst a field of four candidates.

=== 2014 gubernatorial election ===
Capuano considered running for Governor of Massachusetts in 2014. On January 21, 2013, former mayor of Springfield, Massachusetts, and member of the Massachusetts Governor's Council Michael Albano endorsed Capuano to run, posting on his Facebook page: "while the Congressman has not made a decision to compete for the [Democratic] nomination [for Governor] at this time, it is not too early to make the case and encourage his candidacy." When asked in February 2013 whether he might run for governor, Capuano responded: "Part of me thinks that some of the more interesting, more important fights over the next several years might be conducted at statehouses around the country and not necessarily on Capitol Hill." In a statement in September 2013, Capuano announced he would not run for governor, and would instead focus on running for re-election to Congress.

== Personal life ==
Capuano was named after his two grandfathers, and has seven siblings, one of whom died in infancy, and another who died of polio at the age of 5. Capuano married Barbara Teebagy in 1974, and together they have two sons: Michael and Joseph. He is the uncle of actors Chris Evans of the Captain America film series, and Scott Evans of the soap opera One Life to Live through his sister Lisa. In 2003, the City of Somerville dedicated a new school in Capuano's honor; the Michael E. Capuano Early Childhood Center officially opened in September that year.

Capuano is a Roman Catholic. Before Pope Francis became pope and shifted the tone of the Church, Capuano used to fear that his mother would be embarrassed if he was ever denied communion because of his support for gay marriage and abortion rights.

U.S. House of Representatives
Preceded by Joe Kennedy	Member of the U.S. House of Representatives from Massachusetts's 8th congressional district 1999–2013	Succeeded by Steve Lynch
New office	Chair of the House Ethics Enforcement Task Force; 2007–2008	Position abolished
Preceded by Ed Markey	Member of the U.S. House of Representatives from Massachusetts's 7th congressional district 2013–2019	Succeeded by Ayanna Pressley
U.S. order of precedence (ceremonial)
Preceded by Sam Gejdenson as Former U.S. Representative	Order of precedence of the United States as Former U.S. Representative	Succeeded by Roscoe Bartlett as Former U.S. Representative
