= Brian J. Donnelly =

American politician and diplomat (1946–2023)

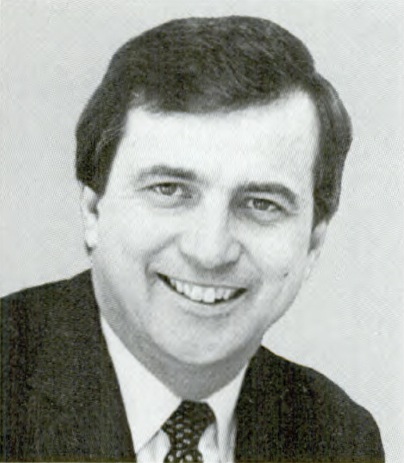

United States Ambassador to Trinidad and Tobago
- In office September 5, 1994 – September 24, 1997
- President: Bill Clinton
- Preceded by: Sally G. Cowal
- Succeeded by: Edward E. Shumaker III

Member of the U.S. House of Representatives from Massachusetts's 11th district
- In office January 3, 1979 – January 3, 1993
- Preceded by: James A. Burke
- Succeeded by: District eliminated

Member of the Massachusetts House of Representatives
- In office 1973–1978
- Succeeded by: Alfred E. Saggese Jr.

Personal details
- Born: March 2, 1946 Boston, Massachusetts, U.S.
- Died: February 28, 2023 (aged 76) East Dennis, Massachusetts, U.S.
- Party: Democratic
- Education: Boston University (BS)

Brian Joseph Donnelly (March 2, 1946 – February 28, 2023) was an American diplomat and politician. He was a Democratic member of the U.S. House of Representatives from Massachusetts from 1979 to 1993, and was the United States Ambassador to Trinidad and Tobago from 1994 to 1997.

== Political career ==
Donnelly was a member of the Massachusetts House of Representatives, 1973–1978, where he served as assistant majority leader in 1977–1978.

Donnelly was elected as a Democrat to the 96th and to the six succeeding U.S. Congresses (January 3, 1979 – January 3, 1993), but was not a candidate for renomination in 1992 to the 103rd Congress. While in Congress, Donnelly served on the Committee on Public Works and Transportation and, beginning in 1985, on the Ways and Means committee.

During his tenure in Congress, Donnelly authored, along with Republican Congressman Bill Archer of Texas, legislation to repeal the Medicare Catastrophic Coverage Act of 1988 (Pub. L. 100–360) after the law became politically unsustainable. The law's political unsustainability reached its peak when the chairman of the committee that drafted the law was chased from his district office by angry senior citizens protesting it. The enactment of the Donnelly legislation restored the Medicare program to its pre-1988 status.

Donnelly's second major accomplishment in Congress was the enactment of the so-called "Donnelly Visa" program, which authorized 5,000 visas annually for citizens of countries that had been historically under-represented in the United States' immigration system that primarily relies on family reunification. The primary beneficiaries of the Donnelly Visa program, in its early years, were Irish nationals – many of whose families lived in Donnelly's Dorchester district. Congress reauthorized the program in 1990; today, it is known as the Diversity Visa (DV) program and authorizes 50,000 visas annually to nationals of countries statistically deemed under-represented in the current immigration system. Donnelly's original intent was for the program to benefit Irish nationals but the reach of the program is far broader today.

As a Knight of Columbus, he helped defeat an effort to tax fraternal insurance companies which would have diminished their ability to make charitable contributions.

In 1994, he was named United States Ambassador to Trinidad and Tobago. He served in this capacity until 1997. In 1998, he ran for Governor of Massachusetts, finishing third in the Democratic primary behind state Attorney General Scott Harshbarger and former state Senator Patricia McGovern.

== Personal life ==
Donnelly attended private schools in Suffolk County. He graduated from Catholic Memorial High School in West Roxbury, in 1963. He received a Bachelor of Science from Boston University in 1970. He was a teacher and coach in the Boston public schools. Donnelly and his wife, Virginia, had two children.

Donnelly died from cancer at his home in East Dennis, Massachusetts, on February 28, 2023, just two days short of turning 77.

== Works cited ==
- Lapomarda, Vincent A. (1992). The Knights of Columbus in Massachusetts (second ed.). Norwood, Massachusetts: Knights of Columbus Massachusetts State Council.

U.S. House of Representatives
Preceded by James A. Burke	Member of the U.S. House of Representatives from Massachusetts's 11th congressional district 1979–1993	District eliminated after 1990 United States census
Diplomatic posts
Preceded by Sally G. Cowal	United States Ambassador to Trinidad and Tobago; 1994–1997	Succeeded by Edward E. Shumaker III
