= Dorothy Kelly Gay =

Politician, 34th mayor of Somerville, Massachusetts, USA

34th Mayor of Somerville
- In office May 21, 1999 – January 5, 2004
- Preceded by: William M. Roche (Acting)
- Succeeded by: Joseph Curtatone

Member of the Massachusetts Governor's Council for the 6th District
- In office 1993–1999
- Preceded by: Daniel G. Hurley
- Succeeded by: Michael J. Callahan

Personal details
- Born: April 23, 1943 (age 83) Ballinasloe, County Galway, Ireland
- Party: Democratic
- Spouse: Bertram Gay
- Education: Mayday Hospital School of Nursing
- Profession: Registered Nurse; Administrative Coordinator of Nursing

Dorothy "Dot" A. Kelly Gay is an Irish-born American politician who served as 34th mayor of Somerville, Massachusetts, and on the Massachusetts Governor's Council.

== Early life ==
Gay was born on April 26, 1943, in Ballinasloe, County Galway, Ireland. Her father was a politician, nurse and union activist. She graduated from Newtown National School, Convent of Mercy Secondary School, and Ballinasloe Technical School. In 1961 she moved to England to pursue a career in nursing. She graduated from the Mayday Hospital School of Nursing in Surrey in 1964. In the early 1960s she met Bertram Gay in London. The couple later married and in 1968 they immigrated to the United States because their child needed a surgery that was only available at Boston Children's Hospital. They settled in Somerville and the couple soon found employment, with Gay getting hired at Somerville's Heritage Hospital. She continued to work as a nurse until 1999.

== Political career ==
In 1986, Kelly Gay was appointed to the Somerville School Committee. She was elected to a full term ten months later. In 1992 Gay was elected to the Massachusetts Governor's Council in the 6th District. In 1998 she ran for Lieutenant Governor of Massachusetts. Gay lost in the Democratic primary to State Senator Warren Tolman 270,791 (54%) votes to 232,250 (46%).

In 1999, Gay was elected Mayor of Somerville in a special election to succeed Michael Capuano, who was elected to the United States House of Representatives. She defeated alderman John Buonomo 6878 votes to 6473. She ran for a full term later that year and was elected unopposed. In 2003, Gay finished third in the preliminary election behind Alderman Joseph Curtatone and businessman Tony Lafuente. Gay's loss was blamed on increasing gang violence, declining economic growth, and cuts in state aid that forced her to cut public services and fire 200 municipal workers.
