= 1998 Massachusetts gubernatorial election =

- November 2, 1998
- Turnout: 51.19% ▼18.86
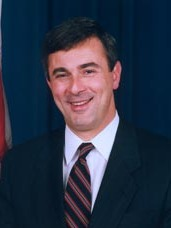

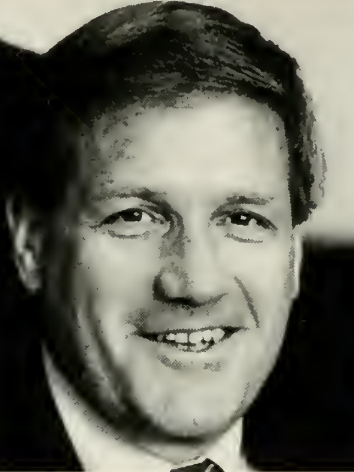
Nominee	Paul Cellucci	Scott Harshbarger
Party	Republican	Democratic
Running mate	Jane Swift	Warren Tolman
Popular vote	967,160	901,843
Percentage	50.87%	47.44%
- Cellucci: 40–50% 50–60% 60–70% 70–80% Harshbarger: 40–50% 50–60% 60–70% 70–80%
Governor before election
Paul Cellucci (acting)
Republican
Elected Governor
Paul Cellucci
Republican

The 1998 Massachusetts gubernatorial election was held on November 3, 1998. Acting governor Paul Cellucci was elected to his first term as governor of Massachusetts.

Primary elections were held on September 16. In the Republican primary, Cellucci defeated a challenge from state treasurer Joe Malone. Harshbarger won the Democratic nomination over state senator Patricia McGovern and former U.S. representative Brian J. Donnelly. Joseph P. Kennedy II was an early favorite for the Democratic nomination but withdrew in August 1997 following a series of personal scandals, including a tell-all book published by his ex-wife and media scrutiny of his brother Michael. He later retired from politics entirely after Michael's death from a skiing accident in December 1997.

== Republican primary ==
=== Governor ===
==== Candidates ====
- Paul Cellucci, acting governor
- Joe Malone, Massachusetts treasurer and receiver-general

==== Withdrew ====
- Bill Weld, incumbent governor since 1991 (to focus on nomination as U.S. ambassador to Mexico)

==== Campaign ====
Early in 1997, popular incumbent Bill Weld was expected to run for re-election to a third term in office, setting up a fierce between him and Democratic U.S. representative Joseph P. Kennedy II. However, Weld withdrew from consideration after his nomination as U.S. ambassador to Mexico, and he resigned as governor entirely on July 29, 1997. His withdrawal and resignation left acting governor Paul Cellucci as the favorite for the Republican nomination.

The race between Cellucci and Malone was acrimonious, with each candidate accusing the other of committing ethical violations. After Kennedy withdrew from the Democratic race in August 1997, some Republicans viewed the race as significantly more winnable and called on Malone to drop out, avoiding an acrimonious primary and unifying behind Cellucci.

==== Polling ====
Poll source	Date(s) administered	Sample size (Note: Key: A – all adults RV – registered voters LV – likely voters V – unclear)	Margin of error	Paul Cellucci	Joe Malone	Undecided
The Boston Globe/WBZ	August 29–30, 1998	400 (RV)	± 4.9%	55%	30%	15%
RKM Research (Note: Poll sponsored by the Boston Herald)	August 25–26, 1998	413 (LV)	± 4.8%	50%	32%	18%

==== Results ====
On September 16, Cellucci defeated Malone to win his party's nomination.

Republican primary results by municipality

Massachusetts Republican gubernatorial primary, 1998
Party	Candidate	Votes	%
Republican	Paul Cellucci (acting)	136,258	58.57%
Republican	Joe Malone	95,963	41.25%
Write-in	All others	442	0.19%
Total votes		232,663	100.00%

=== Lieutenant governor ===
==== Candidates ====
- Janet E. Jeghelian, radio host (running with Malone)
- Jane Swift, secretary of consumer affairs (running with Cellucci)

===== Declined =====
- Charlie Baker, secretary of administration and finance
- Ralph C. Martin II, Suffolk County district attorney

==== Results ====
Massachusetts Republican lt. gubernatorial primary, 1998
Party	Candidate	Votes	%
Republican	Jane Swift	116,476	54.38%
Republican	Janet E. Jeghelian	97,411	45.48%
Write-in	All others	323	0.15%
Total votes		214,210	100.00%

== Democratic primary ==
=== Governor ===
==== Candidates ====
- Brian J. Donnelly, former U.S. representative and U.S.ambassador to Trinidad and Tobago
- Scott Harshbarger, Massachusetts attorney general
- Patricia McGovern, former state senator from Lawrence

===== Withdrew =====
- Joseph P. Kennedy II, U.S. representative from Brighton, Boston and son of Robert F. Kennedy (withdrew August 1997)

==== Declined ====
- Marty Meehan, U.S. representative from Lowell
- Lois Pines, state senator from Newton (to run for lieutenant governor)
- Raymond Flynn, former mayor of Boston

==== Campaign ====
Joseph P. Kennedy II was a prohibitive favorite for the Democratic nomination and the favorite for the gubernatorial race as a whole. He was the first member of the Kennedy family to run for governor of any U.S. state, but the Kennedy family had won eighteen elections to public office while losing none. As a scion of the state's most prominent political family, he was considered an early favorite for the nomination, but his campaign was quickly derailed by personal scandal:

- In early 1997, his ex-wife, Sheila Rauch Kennedy, published her memoir Shattered Faith, in which she accused Kennedy of forcing her to agree to a 1991 annulment of their 12-year marriage against her wishes and against the interests of their twin sons.
- Shortly after the publication of Shattered Faith, Kennedy's brother Michael, who had been expected to run the campaign, faced legal scrutiny and negative media attention for an extramarital affair with his family's underage babysitter, including an investigation for statutory rape.
- In July 1997, Kennedy injured his 16-year-old son by lighting illegal fireworks at the family's Hyannisport compound.
- Finally, in August 1997, Kennedy faced dissent from within the family when his cousin, John F. Kennedy Jr., publicly labeled both him and Michael "poster boys for bad behavior" who had "chased an idealized alternative to their life" in his magazine, George.

Kennedy repeatedly apologized for the scandals, including to delegates at the Massachusetts Democratic state convention, while minimizing his own responsibility for his brother's alleged behavior. In April 1997, he told reporters, "It's a big family. There's always going to be a few little problems along the way, and this one might not be such a little one for everybody." Attorney general Scott Harshbarger, who had been considered a longshot against Kennedy, began to gain in the polls, pulling into a statistical tie in an April 1997 University of Massachusetts poll. The onslaught of negative press eroded Kennedy's popularity among voters, particularly women, a core constituency, and he fell behind Harshbarger in opinion polling. In July, a Boston Globe poll found that only 34 percent of respondents had a favorable opinion of Kennedy, down from 60 percent as recently as January 1997.

Amid the mounting scrutiny and scandal, Kennedy withdrew from the race on August 28, 1997. His decision left Harshbarger as the lone candidate in the race. Kennedy supporters, including fellow U.S. representative Barney Frank, blamed Michael for the decision. When Michael was killed in December 1997, Joseph Kennedy retired from politics entirely, opting not to run for re-election to the U.S. House.

==== Debate ====
1998 Massachusetts gubernatorial election Democratic primary debate
No.	Date	Host	Moderator	Link	Democratic	Democratic	Democratic
Key: P Participant A Absent N Not invited I Invited W Withdrawn							
Key: P Participant A Absent N Not invited I Invited W Withdrawn					Brian J. Donnelly	Scott Harshbarger	Patricia McGovern
1	Sep. 8, 1998	WWLP	Jim Madigan	C-SPAN	P	P	P

==== Polling ====
Poll source	Date(s) administered	Sample size	Margin of error	Patricia McGovern	Scott Harshbarger	Brian J. Donnelly	Undecided
The Boston Globe/WBZ	August 29–30, 1998	400 (RV)	± 4.9%	19%	50%	8%	23%
RKM Research	June 2–3, 1998	409 (LV)	± 5.0%	15%	47%	8%	30%

==== Results ====
Democratic primary results by municipality

Massachusetts Democratic gubernatorial primary, 1998
Party	Candidate	Votes	%
Democratic	Scott Harshbarger	296,212	51.35%
Democratic	Patricia McGovern	180,429	31.28%
Democratic	Brian J. Donnelly	98,774	17.12%
Write-in	All others	1,484	0.26%
Total votes		576,899	100.00%

=== Lieutenant governor ===
==== Candidates ====
- Dorothy Kelly Gay, governor's councilor from Somerville
- Warren Tolman, state senator from Watertown

==== Withdrew ====
- Lois Pines, state senator from Newton

==== Results ====
Massachusetts Democratic lt. gubernatorial primary, 1998
Party	Candidate	Votes	%
Democratic	Warren Tolman	270,791	53.75%
Democratic	Dorothy Kelly Gay	232,250	46.10%
Write-in	All others	768	0.15%
Total votes		503,809	100.00%

== General election ==
=== Candidates ===
- Paul Cellucci, incumbent governor of Massachusetts since 1997 (Republican)
  - Running mate: Jane Swift, former Massachusetts secretary of consumer affairs and state senator from Williamstown
- Dean Cook (Libertarian)
- Scott Harshbarger, Massachusetts attorney general (Democratic)
  - Running mate: Warren Tolman, state senator from Watertown

=== Campaign ===
After Harshbarger's primary victory, many moderate Democrats who had voted for McGovern or Donnelly chose to support the socially liberal, fiscally moderate Cellucci instead of the more liberal Harshbarger.

=== Debate ===
1998 Massachusetts gubernatorial election debate
No.	Date	Host	Moderator	Link	Republican	Democratic
Key: P Participant A Absent N Not invited I Invited W Withdrawn						
Key: P Participant A Absent N Not invited I Invited W Withdrawn					Paul Cellucci	Scott Harshbarger
1	Oct. 26, 1998	Boston Herald; The Boston Globe; New England Cable News; WCVB-TV; WHDH-TV; WBZ-TV	Charles Ogletree	C-SPAN	P	P

=== Polling ===
In a January opinion poll, Cellucci led Harshbarger 50%-30%. By August, Harshbarger had taken a 37%-35% lead over Cellucci.

Poll source	Date(s)	Sample size	Margin of error	Paul Cellucci (R)	Scott Harshbarger (D)	Other / undecided (Note: Calculated by taking the difference of 100% and all other candidates combined.)
Harris Insights & Analytics	October 30, 1998	1,083	—	54%	43%	3%
RKM Research and Communications Inc.	October 28, 1998	402	—	47%	38%	15%
SurveyUSA	October 28, 1998	500	—	48%	44%	8%
KRC/Communications Research	October 27, 1998	400	—	46%	41%	13%
Harris Insights & Analytics	October 20, 1998	907	—	56%	36%	8%
RKM Research and Communications Inc. (Note: Poll sponsored by WCVB and the Boston Herald)	October 19–20, 1998	402 (LV)	± 5.0%	46%	41%	13%
The Boston Globe/WBZ	October 6–7, 1998	400 (LV)	± 5.0%	46%	40%	14%
Mason-Dixon Polling & Strategy	October 19, 1998	625	—	46%	41%	13%
University of Massachusetts McCormack Institute	October 2–6, 1998	630 (LV)	± 5.0%	43%	35%	22%
	September 16, 1998	Primary elections held				
RKM Research	January 22–23, 1998	414 (RV)	± 5.0%	55%	29%	16%

=== Results ===
On November 3, Cellucci defeated Harshbarger by 65,317 votes.

Massachusetts gubernatorial election, 1998
Party	Candidate	Votes	%	±%
Republican	Paul Cellucci (incumbent)	967,160	50.87%	▼20.00
Democratic	Scott Harshbarger	901,843	47.44%	▲19.17
Libertarian	Dean Cook	32,184	1.69%	▲1.01
Write-in		2,149	0.11%	
Total votes		1,901,187	51.19%	
N/A	Blank votes	31,941	1.65%	
Turnout		1,935,277	51.19%	
Republican hold		Swing		

=== Results by county ===
1998 United States gubernatorial election in Massachusetts (by county)
County	Cellucci - R %	Cellucci - R #	Harshbarger - D %	Harshbarger - D #	Others %	Others #	Total #
Barnstable	54.7%	50,690	43.4%	40,259	1.9%	1,718	92,667
Berkshire	50.6%	20,679	47.9%	19,593	1.5%	1,086	40,900
Bristol	49.2%	69,209	49.2%	69,190	1.7%	2,309	140,708
Dukes	41.7%	2,639	56.0%	3,550	2.4%	147	6,336
Essex	53.4%	118,540	44.8%	99,452	1.9%	4,147	222,139
Franklin	42.5%	9,882	55.4%	12,866	2.1%	484	23,232
Hampden	50.3%	58,517	47.9%	55,709	1.8%	2,138	116,364
Hampshire	40.9%	19,239	57.1%	26,836	2.0%	957	47,032
Middlesex	48.9%	230,004	49.4%	232,302	1.8%	8,285	470,691
Nantucket	49.8%	1,755	47.7%	1,681	2.5%	89	3,525
Norfolk	52.1%	120,729	46.2%	106,999	1.7%	3,958	231,686
Plymouth	56.5%	81,047	41.5%	59,525	2.1%	2,997	143,569
Suffolk	40.6%	58,384	57.7%	83,048	1.7%	2,398	143,830
Worcester	57.0%	125,846	41.2%	90,833	1.8%	3,978	220,657

Counties that flipped from Republican to Democratic

- Dukes
- Franklin
- Hampshire
- Middlesex
- Suffolk

== Notes ==
Polling

Clients

== See also ==
- Massachusetts general election, 1998
- 1997–1998 Massachusetts legislature
