= Thomas Reilly (Massachusetts politician) =

American lawyer and politician

Tom Reilly
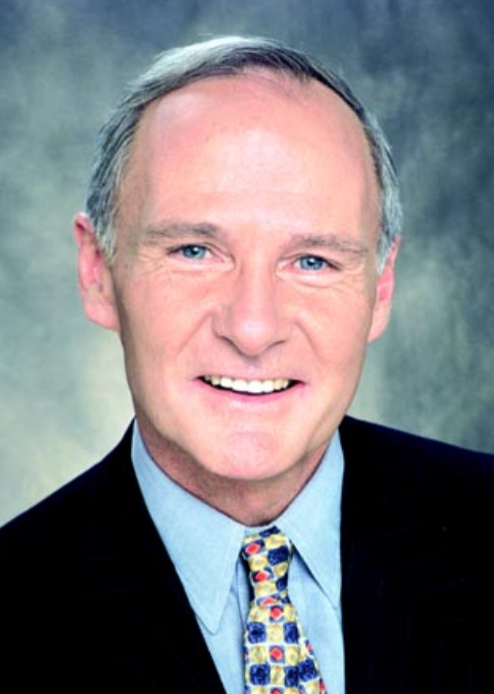
- Reilly, circa 2003–2004

42nd Attorney General of Massachusetts
- In office January 7, 1999 – January 17, 2007
- Governor: Paul Cellucci; Jane Swift; Mitt Romney
- Preceded by: Scott Harshbarger
- Succeeded by: Martha Coakley

Massachusetts District Attorney for the Northern District
- In office January 3, 1991 – January 7, 1999
- Preceded by: Scott Harshbarger
- Succeeded by: Martha Coakley

Personal details
- Born: Thomas Francis Reilly; February 14, 1942 (age 84) Springfield, Massachusetts, U.S.
- Party: Democratic
- Spouse: Ruth Gammons
- Children: 3
- Education: American International College (BA); Boston College (JD)

Thomas Francis Reilly (born February 14, 1942) is an American attorney and politician who served as the 45th Massachusetts Attorney General. He was born in Springfield, Massachusetts to Irish immigrant parents.

He was one of three candidates who sought the Democratic nomination for governor of Massachusetts in the 2006 election. Former U.S. Assistant Attorney General Deval Patrick won the party's nomination and the general election, defeating Reilly and businessman Chris Gabrieli.

== Early life ==
A native of Springfield, Massachusetts, he described himself as a "misguided youth" the year his father, Mortimer "Murty" Reilly, was found dead at home from a heart attack when Reilly was 16. He was arrested for public drunkenness when he was 20. By age 22, he was focused with driving ambition, much to the credit of his friend Wayne Budd's father, Marine turned policeman in Springfield who took him under his wing and encouraged him to go to school.

== Education ==
Reilly attended Cathedral High School in Springfield, Massachusetts. He graduated in 1959. After graduating high school, he went off to college in Nova Scotia at St. Francis Xavier University. He stayed there only a year, transferring to American International College in Springfield, Massachusetts, where he graduated on June 7, 1964. He received a Bachelor of Arts in economics.

== Personal life ==
In July 1966, Reilly married Ruth Gammons (b. 1941), now a retired schoolteacher. The couple have three children.

== Later life and legal career ==
He moved to Washington, D.C., and worked for two years with the Central Intelligence Agency. For one year, Reilly lived in Dearborn, Michigan, where he worked with the Ford Motor Company as a Labor Relations Representative until 1967. He attended Boston College Law School and received his JD in June 1970.

Reilly worked for two years as a prosecutor in the state Attorney General's civil rights division. He worked for four years as a Suffolk County prosecutor. In 1976, Reilly and Budd formed "Budd and Reilly", a Boston-based law firm. The firm became the largest minority-dominated firm in New England.

== Political career ==
From 1978 - 1985, he served on the Watertown Licensing Board in Watertown, Massachusetts.

He left the law firm in 1983 to work in Middlesex County District Attorney Scott Harshbarger's administration as First Assistant District Attorney. In 1990, Reilly was elected Middlesex County District Attorney. He was reelected for a second term.

He ran for attorney general in 1998 against state Senator Lois Pines and won the Democratic Primary. He defeated Republican Brad Bailey in the November election.

In the winter of 2001–02, he conducted a "very public investigation" into the sale of the Boston Red Sox to a group led by John W. Henry. Reilly made "negative comments about the process, Major League Baseball's involvement in the sale, and threatened to block the transaction. Eventually the Red Sox limited partners, the Henry/Werner group, and Reilly negotiated a settlement, in which Reilly agreed to allow the sale to proceed, the Henry/Werner group agreed to create their own charitable foundation, and the Red Sox limited partners agreed to give $10 million more to the Yawkey Foundation." The existence of "higher bids from Charles F. Dolan ($750 million), chairman of Cablevision, and a group headed by Miles Prentice ($755 million)" were the apparent pretext for Reilly's involvement, as the winning bid from Henry's group only totalled $660 million.

He was reelected for a second term in 2002.

On November 30, 2005, he said that he was conducting an investigation of Sony BMG over their use of the XCP digital rights management on Sony audio CDs.

In January 2006, he came under fire for allegedly impeding an investigation into an October 2005 automobile crash which left two Southborough, Massachusetts teens dead, and another teen injured.

He has come under fire from gun rights advocates for allegedly abusing his regulatory authority for political purposes.

On January 24, 2006, Reilly officially kicked off his first gubernatorial campaign in Springfield at his alma mater American International College. He finished third in the primary on September 19, 2006. His opponent, Deval Patrick, went on to win the general election.

== Post-political career ==
He served as president and later a member of the board of directors of the Watertown Boys & Girls Club. He now serves as special counsel with the law firm of Hunton Andrews Kurth.

In 2018, he was handpicked by the Massachusetts State Police to lead an investigation into a car crash that occurred on August 24, 2017, in Reading, Massachusetts.

Party political offices
| Preceded by Scott Harshbarger | Democratic nominee for Attorney General of Massachusetts; 1998, 2002 | Succeeded by Martha Coakley |
Legal offices
| Preceded by Scott Harshbarger | District Attorney of Middlesex County, Massachusetts; 1991–1999 | Succeeded by Martha Coakley |
| Preceded by Scott Harshbarger | Attorney General of Massachusetts; 1999 - 2007 | Succeeded by Martha Coakley |
