= Arthur E. Chase =

American businessman and politician

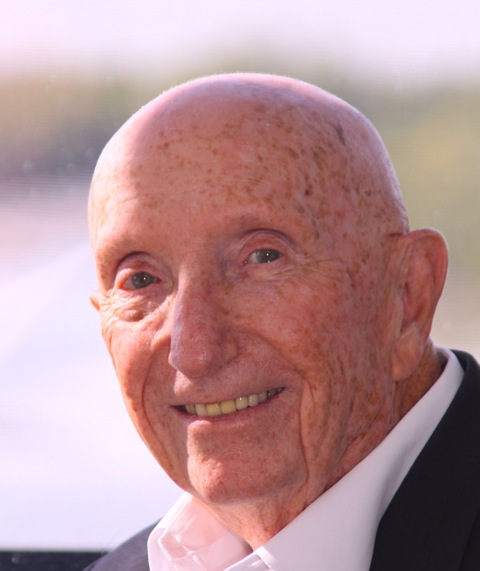

Member of the Massachusetts Senate from the Worcester District
- In office 1991–1995
- Preceded by: Thomas P. White
- Succeeded by: Robert A. Bernstein

Personal details
- Born: February 4, 1930 Worcester, Massachusetts
- Died: January 5, 2015 (aged 84) Worcester, Massachusetts
- Resting place: B'nei Brith cemetery, Worcester, Massachusetts
- Party: Republican
- Spouse(s): Wynne L. Chase and later Elaine Kaufman Chase
- Education: Worcester Junior College
- Occupation: Businessman; Politician

Arthur E. Chase (February 4, 1930 – January 5, 2015) was an American businessman and politician who represented the Worcester District in the Massachusetts Senate from 1991 to 1995. He co-founded the Central Massachusetts Legislative Caucus. In 1991 he designed the Massachusetts Academy of Math and Science at WPI and in 1992 sponsored legislation to create it. He was the Republican nominee for Secretary of the Commonwealth of Massachusetts in 1994, but lost in the general election to William F. Galvin.

== Early life ==
Chase was born on February 4, 1930, in Worcester, Massachusetts. He graduated from Commerce High School in 1947 and Worcester Junior College in 1951. Chase served in the United States Army from 1952 to 1954.

== Business career ==
In 1947, Chase and his family founded Chase Paper Company, a stationery company. In 1977, Chase was selected by the U.S. Small Business Administration as the Small Business Person of the Year. That same year he received a certificate from the Harvard Business School Smaller Company Management Program The company was chosen to print the official invitations for the 1981 inauguration of Ronald Reagan. In 1984, Chase sold his interest in Chase Paper Company.

In 1989, Chase founded a second stationery company, Checkerboard Ltd. Checkerboard specializes in personalized invitations and stationery. It was one of the first stationery companies to offer the products created with recycled paper. In 1992, Chase convinced his youngest son, Micah Chase, to join the company. He succeeded his father as Checkerboard's CEO in 1994. In 2011, Checkerboard received the Central Massachusetts Family Business Award from the Graduate School of Management at Clark University.

== Political career ==
Arthur E. Chase was a businessman whose political positions sometimes put him at odds with his Republican colleagues. He was considered a very pragmatic politician who was not afraid to take unpopular positions and who was highly respected by Democrats and Republicans alike.

As a state senator from the minority party, he worked with Democratic legislators to create the Central Massachusetts Legislative Caucus, which was organized around issues related to Central Massachusetts.

In 1988, Arthur Chase was a delegate to Republican National Convention from Massachusetts.

Arthur Chase set an example as a leader willing to make changes at the expense of popularity. In 1992, he supported the use of less expensive flag men at construction site instead of paid policemen at construction site, thereby risking the votes policemen in his district. At meetings to prevent the siting of a group home for mentally handicapped adolescents in a neighborhood in his district, Chase openly opposed efforts to ban group homes within 1000 feet of a school on the grounds that it would effectively keep such homes out of the city of Worcester altogether. Chase regularly served as an emergency foster parent for abused, neglected and runaway adolescents through Y.O.U. Inc.

=== Worcester city government ===
Chase's career in public service began as a member the advisory board of Quinsigamond Community College. From 1978 to 1981 he was a member of the Worcester School Committee. During his tenure on the School Committee, Chase supported bilingual education and successfully pushed for public transportation in Latino neighborhoods where the children had been forced to take dangerous short cuts to get to school. He is also credited with leading the move to consolidate the Vocational and Public School systems in the City of Worcester.

From 1983 to 1989, Chase served as an at-large member of the Worcester City Council. Councilor Chase was a fiscal conservative who led the fights for a water purification and filtration system, streamlining of the city's data processing system, proper handling of hazardous waste, affirmative action, broader representation on city boards and commissions, and cleaning up and improving the inner-city neighborhoods.

=== Massachusetts State Senate ===
Chase represented Boylston, Clinton, Shrewsbury, West Boylston and Wards 1, 2, 3, 4, 9 and 10 of Worcester in the Massachusetts Senate from 1991 to 1995. During this time he served on the Counties (1991–1994), Ways and Means (1991–1994), Health Care (1991–1992), Steering and Policy (1991–1992), Education (1993–1994), Arts and Humanities (1993–1994), Local Affairs (1993–1994), and Public Service Committees (1993–1994).

During his tenure in the Senate, Chase co-founded the Central Massachusetts Legislative Caucus. He designed the Massachusetts Academy of Math and Science at WPI then the sponsored legislation to create it, and was a leader in the effort to abolish county governments, reform unemployment insurance laws, and correct flaws in the program that allowed students to attend school in neighboring districts., supported the creation of a commuter rail service between Worcester and Boston Chase was also pro-choice, which put him at odds with some members of his party.

In 1991, Senator Chase fought against the way the School Choice bill was being financed, which he felt was a "reverse Robin Hood" that took money away from poorer communities to finance richer ones. Amendments were later made over the course of the next three years that changed the way that school choice would be funded.

As part of the 17-member special commission to study the problem of state-operated hospitals, Chase was instrumental moving mental health patients from old and ill-equipped state hospitals into community-based services that were both more effective and less expensive than institutional care. In addition to improving the conditions for the mental health patients, this was estimated to have saved the Commonwealth of Massachusetts more than $35 million in annual operating costs and another $40 million in capital costs that would otherwise need to be spent to bring antiquated facilities up to the standards of the Joint Commission on Accreditation of Healthcare Organization and the Health Care Finance Administration.

In 1993, Chase opposed the legislative override of the Governor's veto of the Pacheco anti-privatization bill because he felt that the law "serves only to protect the monopoly of a government bureaucracy..."

When the budget from the Senate Ways and Means Committee appeared to "punish" State Senator Chase's district for openly challenging the power of the President of the Senate, Billy Bulger, Chase managed to mobilize other key legislators and organization to undo most of the damage.

In order to undo the move of the $1.5 million annual operating costs of Clinton's sewage treatment plant from the Massachusetts Water Authority to the local residents despite the agreement from 1897 to provide Clinton with free sewage in return for allowing 40% of the town to be submerged to create the Wachusett Reservoir, Senator Chase worked with Senator Robert A. Antonioni D-Leominster to get that change removed from the budget. The district of Senator Antonioni, who was from the Senate President's political party, included Lancaster which was tied into the Clinton sewage system and would have had to share the financial burden.

In order to return a $22 million subsidy for the University of Massachusetts Medical School that is located in Worcester, Chase turned to the Central Massachusetts Legislative Caucus which he had co-founded, and received the support of the Speaker of the House and the Chairman of the House Ways and Means Committee in order to reinstate the subsidy into the final budget that came out of the Senate–House conference committee.

After Senator Chase was unable to get the funding for the Massachusetts Academy of Mathematics and Science that was cut budget returned, managed to undo the damage by convincing Worcester Polytechnic Institute which hosted the academy, to loan the funds until they could be added as an attachment to a future bill.

=== Campaign for Secretary of the Commonwealth of Massachusetts ===
In 1994, Chase ran for Secretary of the Commonwealth of Massachusetts. He was the first Republican candidate to enter the race. His candidacy was poorly received by some members of his party, who circulated buttons that said "Anybody But Chase" and "Another Republican for Augie Grace" (a Democratic candidate for Secretary of the Commonwealth). House Minority Leader Peter Forman later entered the race and defeated Chase at the state party convention 66% to 34%. However, because Chase received more than 15% of the vote, he earned a spot on the primary ballot. Chase defeated Forman in the primary by 753 votes, but lost to William F. Galvin in the general election 55% to 41%.

=== Later campaigns ===
After leaving the Senate, Chase continued to campaign to end county government and is credited with getting rid of the excesses of County Government.

In 1995, Chase was named Massachusetts chairman of Arlen Specter's presidential campaign.

In 1996, Chase ran for Treasurer of Worcester County, Massachusetts. He lost to incumbent Michael J. Donoughue 57% to 43%.

== Personal life ==
Starting with a lead role as the Mikado in 1947, Arthur was an active member of the Worcester County Light Opera Club (WCLOC) Theater Company. He served as WCLOC President for the 1954–1955 season. In the 21st season he played Mayor Shinn in Music Man.

Arthur moved to Naples, Florida, with his wife Elaine in 2004, and soon after, was on the board of directors for the Heron in Pelican Bay. While in Naples and on the board of directors, Chase worked to preserve the Clam Pass and its mangrove forest. He also supported Conservancy of Southwest Florida, the Naples Council on World Affairs, the Naples Botanical Gardens, the Neighborhood Health Clinic, Planned Parenthood of Collier County, the local Holocaust Museum and the Mangrove Action Group.

Party political offices
| Preceded by Paul McCarthy | Republican nominee for Secretary of the Commonwealth of Massachusetts; 1994 | Succeeded by Dale C. Jenkins |
