= Janis M. Berry =

American jurist

Janis M. Berry is an American jurist who served as an associate justice of the Massachusetts Appeals Court from 2001 to 2016.

== Early life ==
Berry was born and raised in Everett, Massachusetts. Her father was a dump truck driver and her mother worked as a factory meat packer. In the 1960s she moved to Saugus, Massachusetts. She graduated from Boston University and Boston University School of Law.

== Attorney ==
In the mid-1970s she served as law clerk to Edward F. Hennessey, an associate justice of the Massachusetts Supreme Judicial Court. She later served for six years as a federal prosecutor, which included working as Chief of the U.S. Justice Department's New England Organized Crime Drug Enforcement Task Force. In 1986 she was named a partner at Ropes & Gray. From 1986 to 1991 she was also a board member of the Supreme Judicial Court's Committee on Public Counsel Services. She served on the Governor's Judicial Nominating Council and the Board of Bar Overseers as well.

From 1997 to 2000 she was a partner at Rubin and Rudman LLC.

== Politics ==
In 1994, Berry resigned from Ropes & Gray to run for Massachusetts Attorney General. She won the convention nomination and defeated Guy Carbone 71% to 29% in the Republican Primary. She lost the general election to Scott Harshbarger 70% to 30%.

== Judicial career ==
In December 2000 she was nominated by Governor Paul Cellucci to serve on the Massachusetts Appeals Court. She was confirmed by the Massachusetts Governor's Council and sworn in on February 28, 2001.

In addition to serving on the Massachusetts Appeals Court, Berry has also served as chairperson of a U.S. Magistrate Selection Panel and worked as an adjunct professor at Boston University School of Law, Northeastern University School of Law, and Suffolk University Law School. She also has been an instructor at Harvard Law School and the U.S. Department of Justice Advocacy Institute.

Party political offices
Preceded by William C. Sawyer	Massachusetts Republican Party Attorney General candidate 1994 (lost)	Succeeded by Brad Bailey
