= Michael L. Kennedy =

Son of Robert F. Kennedy

- Kennedy in 1987
- Born: February 27, 1958; Washington, D.C., U.S.
- Died: December 31, 1997 (aged 39); Aspen, Colorado, U.S.
- Cause of death: Skiing accident
- Burial place: Holyhood Cemetery, Brookline, Massachusetts
- Education: Harvard University (BA); University of Virginia (JD)
- Spouse: Victoria Denise Gifford (m. 1981; sep. 1997)
- Children: 3
- Parent(s): Robert F. Kennedy; Ethel Skakel
- Family: Kennedy family

Michael LeMoyne Kennedy (February 27, 1958 – December 31, 1997) was an American lawyer, businessman, and activist in Massachusetts. He was the sixth of eleven children of Robert F. Kennedy and Ethel Kennedy. Kennedy also served as the manager of the non-profit organization Citizens Energy. He died in Aspen, Colorado, in 1997 after inadvertently skiing into a tree.

== Early life and education ==
Michael LeMoyne Kennedy was born on February 27, 1958, in Washington, D.C. He was named LeMoyne for Kirk LeMoyne Billings, the preparatory school roommate of his paternal uncle, John F. Kennedy, and a Kennedy family friend. He was five years old when his uncle was assassinated and ten years old when his father was assassinated. Kennedy spent his childhood between the family's homes in McLean, Virginia, and Hyannis Port, Massachusetts.

Kennedy graduated from Harvard College in 1980 and subsequently earned his Juris Doctor from the University of Virginia School of Law in 1984. While in college, he was credited with recovering a stolen wristwatch from a thief while on a sightseeing tour in Colombia. In 1985, Kennedy was admitted to the Massachusetts bar.

== Personal life ==
Kennedy married Victoria Denise Gifford, daughter of former NFL player and sportscaster Frank Gifford, on March 14, 1981 in New York City. They had one son, Michael LeMoyne Kennedy Jr. (b. 1983); and two daughters, Kyle Francis Kennedy (1984–2026) and Rory Gifford Kennedy (b. 1987). The family resided in Cohasset, Massachusetts.

== Career ==
A Boston lawyer, Kennedy briefly worked for a private law firm before becoming chairman of his brother Joseph's non-profit organization, Citizens Energy Corporation in 1986, which provides heating oil and services to elderly and low-income households in Massachusetts. Under Kennedy, Citizens diversified to provide discount AIDS-related medications to uninsured patients.

Kennedy co-chaired the Walden Woods Project, a non-profit organization to preserve Walden Pond in Concord, Massachusetts. In 1994, he co-founded Stop Handgun Violence, a Boston-based group that works to increase public awareness about the danger of handguns. That same year, he helped organize his uncle Ted Kennedy's successful re-election campaign for the U.S. Senate against Republican challenger Mitt Romney. The conventional wisdom in Massachusetts was that he would be the next Kennedy family member to run for political office.

In 1992, Kennedy, his wife Victoria, and his mother Ethel made a cameo appearance on the NBC sitcom Cheers in Boston.

=== Allegations ===
In 1997, allegations were reported that Kennedy was having an affair with the family's underage former babysitter, beginning when she was just 14 years old. Kennedy took and passed three polygraph tests arranged by his attorneys, claiming he had not had sex with the Cohasset teen until she was 16, the legal age of consent in Massachusetts at the time. Soon after the scandal began, Kennedy and his wife separated. Norfolk County District Attorney Jeffrey Locke decided to drop the investigation into statutory rape allegations because of a lack of cooperation from the babysitter. Kennedy and his older brother Joseph (who withdrew from the 1998 Massachusetts gubernatorial election, in part because of the scandal) were dubbed "poster boys for bad behavior" by cousin John F. Kennedy Jr. in an editorial in his magazine George. According to some Massachusetts political observers, the incident ended Kennedy's hopes of following in his family's political footsteps. According to Boston University professor Tobe Berkovitz, "I would have to think as both a political and a public figure, he is just finished."

== Death ==
Kennedy died on December 31, 1997, as the result of a skiing accident in Aspen Mountain, Colorado. He was playing football while on skis with several other members of the Kennedy family when, at approximately 4:15 p.m., he hit a tree. Kennedy was not wearing a helmet or other safety equipment. The family had been admonished by the ski patrol to cease the activity. After the accident, Kennedy's younger sister Rory Kennedy tried to save his life by giving him mouth-to-mouth resuscitation until medical help arrived.

After medical help arrived, Kennedy was taken to Aspen Valley Hospital, where he was pronounced dead at 5:50 p.m.

He was interred on January 3, 1998, in the family plot at Holyhood Cemetery in Brookline, Massachusetts.

== See also ==
- Kennedy family
- Kennedy curse
- List of skiing deaths
