= Marianne Brenton =

American politician

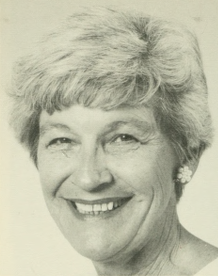

Member of the Massachusetts House of Representatives from the 23rd Middlesex District
- In office 1991–1997
- Preceded by: Augusto Grace
- Succeeded by: Charles A. Murphy

Personal details
- Born: February 25, 1933 Freeport, Maine
- Died: February 10, 2013 (aged 79) Haverhill, Massachusetts
- Party: Republican
- Spouse: Richard Brenton
- Education: Bates College
- Occupation: Technical librarian Politician

Marianne Brenton (February 25, 1933 – February 10, 2013) was an American politician who represented the 23rd Middlesex District in the Massachusetts House of Representatives from 1991 to 1997, was a member of the Burlington School Committee from 1972 to 1981, and was a member of the Burlington Ways and Means Committee from 1982 to 1984. She died on February 10, 2013, of natural causes in Haverhill, Massachusetts.
