= 1994 Massachusetts elections =

1994 Massachusetts general election
- November 8, 1994

Part of the 1994 United States elections

A Massachusetts general election was held on November 8, 1994 in the Commonwealth of Massachusetts.

The election included:

- statewide elections for United States Senator, Governor, Lieutenant Governor, Attorney General, Secretary of the Commonwealth, Treasurer, and Auditor;
- district elections for U.S. Representatives, State Representatives, State Senators, and Governor's Councillors; and
- ballot questions at the state and local levels.

Democratic and Republican candidates were selected in party primaries held September 20, 1994.

== Governor and lieutenant governor ==
Republicans William Weld and Paul Cellucci were re-elected Governor and Lieutenant Governor, respectively, over Democratic candidates Mark Roosevelt and Bob Massie. Weld's 43% margin of victory is the largest in the history of Massachusetts Gubernatorial elections.

== Attorney general ==
1994 Massachusetts Attorney General election
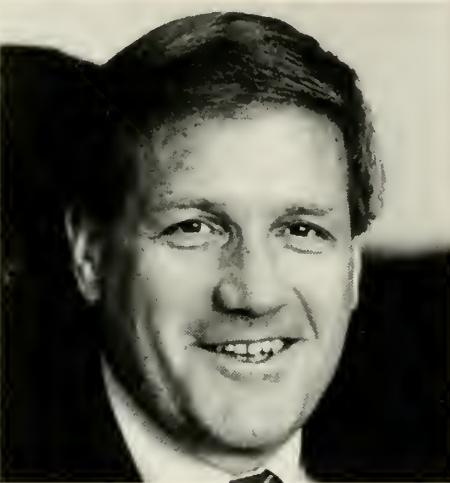

Nominee	Scott Harshbarger	Janis Berry
Party	Democratic	Republican
Popular vote	1,472,621	616,509
Percentage	70.5%	29.5%
Attorney General before election
Scott Harshbarger
Democratic
Elected Attorney General
Scott Harshbarger
Democratic

Democrat Scott Harshbarger was reelected Attorney General. He defeated Republican Janis M. Berry in the general election.

=== Republican primary ===
==== Candidates ====
- Janis M. Berry
- Guy Carbone

==== Results ====
Massachusetts Attorney General Republican Primary, 1994
Party	Candidate	Votes	%
Republican	Janis M. Berry	138,875	71.09%
Republican	Guy Carbone	56,288	28.81%
Write-in		215	0.00%

=== General election ===
Massachusetts Attorney General Election, 1994
Party	Candidate	Votes	%	±%
Democratic	Scott Harshbarger (incumbent)	1,472,621	70.47%	
Republican	Janis M. Berry	616,509	29.50%	
Write-in		486	0.02%	

== Secretary of the Commonwealth ==
1994 Massachusetts Secretary of the Commonwealth election
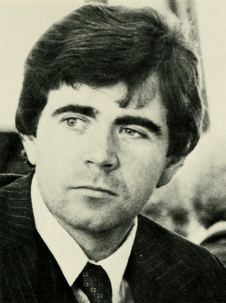

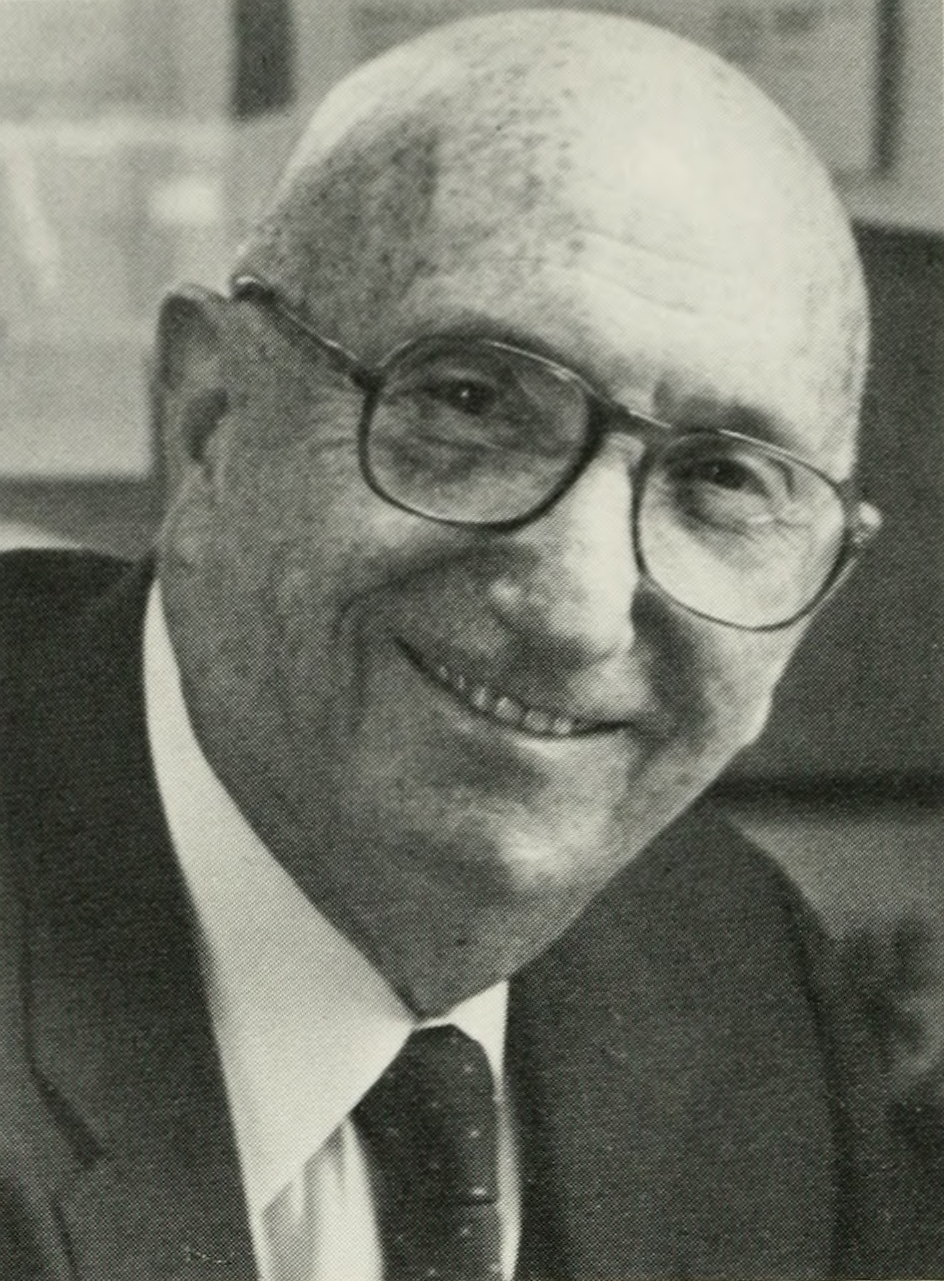
Nominee	William F. Galvin	Arthur E. Chase
Party	Democratic	Republican
Popular vote	1,077,506	813,068
Percentage	54.7%	41.3%
Treasurer and Receiver-General before election
Michael J. Connolly
Democratic
Elected Treasurer and Receiver-General
William F. Galvin
Democratic

Incumbent Secretary of the Commonwealth Michael J. Connolly did not for reelection. Democrat William F. Galvin defeated former State Representative Augusto Grace in the Democratic primary and Republican State Senator Arthur E. Chase and Libertarian Peter C. Everett in the general election.

=== Democratic primary ===
==== Candidates ====
- William F. Galvin, former State Representative from Allston–Brighton, Boston and nominee for Treasurer in 1990
- Augusto Grace, former State Representative from Burlington

==== Results ====
Massachusetts Secretary of the Commonwealth Democratic Primary, 1994
Party	Candidate	Votes	%
Democratic	William F. Galvin	262,018	63.72%
Democratic	Augusto Grace	148,785	36.18%
Write-in		418	0.00%

=== Republican primary ===
==== Candidates ====
- Arthur E. Chase, State Senator from Worcester
- Peter Forman, Massachusetts House Minority Leader and State Representative from Plymouth

==== Results ====
Massachusetts Secretary of the Commonwealth Republican Primary, 1994
Party	Candidate	Votes	%
Republican	Arthur E. Chase	97,079	50.13%
Republican	Peter Forman	96,362	49.76%
Write-in		186	0.00%

=== General election ===
Massachusetts Secretary of the Commonwealth Election, 1994
Party	Candidate	Votes	%	±%
Democratic	William F. Galvin	1,077,506	54.73%	
Republican	Arthur E. Chase	813,068	41.30%	
Libertarian	Peter C. Everett	77,584	3.94%	
Write-in		567	0.03%	

== Treasurer and Receiver-General ==
1994 Massachusetts Treasurer and Receiver-General election
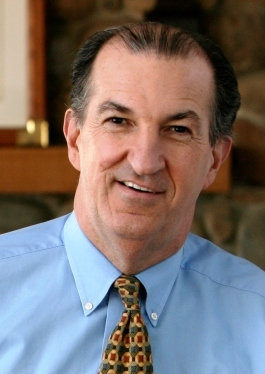

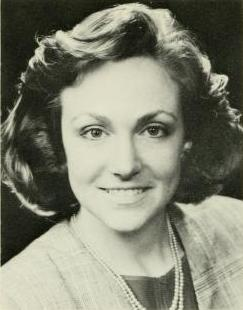
Nominee	Joe Malone	Shannon O'Brien
Party	Republican	Democratic
Popular vote	1,319,916	669,567
Percentage	63.0%	32.0%
- County results Malone: 50–60% 60–70% O'Brien: 50–60%
Treasurer and Receiver-General before election
Joe Malone
Republican
Elected Treasurer and Receiver-General
Joe Malone
Republican

Republican Joe Malone was re-elected Treasurer and Receiver-General. He defeated Democratic State Representative Shannon O'Brien, Independent Tom Tierney and Libertarian Sue Poulin.

=== Candidates ===
- Joe Malone, incumbent Treasurer and Receiver-General (Republican)
- Shannon O'Brien, State Senator from Easthampton (Democratic)
- Sue Poulin (Libertarian)
- Tom Tierney (Independent)

=== Results ===
Massachusetts Treasurer and Receiver-General Election, 1994
Party	Candidate	Votes	%	±%
Republican	Joe Malone (incumbent)	1,319,916	63.02%	
Democratic	Shannon O'Brien	669,567	31.97%	
Independent	Tom Tierney	60,000	2.87%	
Libertarian	Sue Poulin	44,702	2.13%	
Write-in		240	0.01%	

== Auditor ==
1994 Massachusetts Auditor election
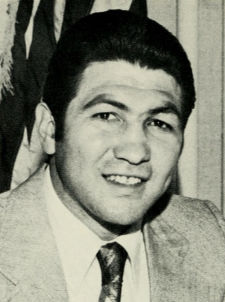

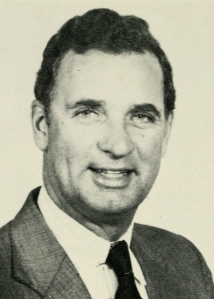
Nominee	A. Joseph DeNucci	Forrester Clark
Party	Democratic	Republican
Popular vote	1,432,301	801,116
Percentage	72.0%	25.3%
Auditor before election
A. Joseph DeNucci
Democratic
Elected Auditor
A. Joseph DeNucci
Democratic

Democrat A. Joseph DeNucci was re-elected Auditor. He defeated Republican Forrester Clark and Libertarian candidate Geoff M. Weil.

=== Republican primary ===
==== Candidates ====
- Forrester Clark, State Representative from Hamilton
- Earle Stroll

==== Results ====
Massachusetts Auditor Republican Primary, 1994
Party	Candidate	Votes	%
Republican	Tim Clark	121,419	70.24%
Republican	Earle Stroll	51,449	29.76%
Write-in		497	0.00%

=== General election ===
Massachusetts Auditor General Election, 1994
Party	Candidate	Votes	%	±%
Democratic	A. Joseph DeNucci (incumbent)	1,432,301	72.03%	
Republican	Tim Clark	503,064	25.30%	
Libertarian	Geoff M. Weil	52,698	2.65%	
Write-in		421	0.02%	

== United States Senator ==
Democratic incumbent Ted Kennedy was re-elected over Republican Mitt Romney, Libertarian Mary Fridley, and LaRouche Was Right candidate William A. Ferguson, Jr. It was the closest re-election race of Senator Kennedy's career.

== Ballot questions ==
=== Question 1 ===
Law Proposed by Initiative Petition - This initiative sought to limit the way in which business and certain nonprofit corporations could contribute to and spend money on campaigns involving an initiative, referendum or other question submitted to the voters at a state or local election. The initiative would require ballot committees organized to support or oppose any question to the voters to disclose promptly certain contributions made late in the campaign; would establish procedures that business and certain nonprofit corporations would have to follow in order to spend money on ballot question campaigns; and would establish voluntary spending limits for ballot committees.

Law Proposed by Initiative Petition
Candidate		Votes	%	±
	Yes	822,065	40.14%	
✓	No	1,225,725	59.86%	

=== Question 2 ===
Referendum on an Existing Law - This referendum sought to require drivers and passengers in certain motor vehicles on public ways to wear properly adjusted and fastened safety belts.

Referendum on an Existing Law
Candidate		Votes	%	±
✓	Yes	1,240,271	59.48%	
	No	844,755	40.52%	

=== Question 3 ===
Referendum on an Existing Law - This referendum sought to eliminate one of the two ways in which students may authorize fees to be assessed on tuition bills at state-operated colleges and universities to support nonpartisan student organizations that attempt to influence state legislation.

Referendum on an Existing Law
Candidate		Votes	%	±
	Yes	964,871	48.84%	
✓	No	1,011,474	51.16%	

=== Question 4 ===
Law Proposed by Initiative Petition - This initiative sought to prevent the name of a person from being printed on a state primary ballot as a candidate for one of a number of specified state and federal offices, if the person has already served a certain number of consecutive terms in that office within a fixed period preceding the end of the then-current term of office. If such a person were still elected by write-in vote to one of the state offices (except for the office of Governor), the person would serve without a salary, and in some of the state offices, without payment for certain expenses.

Law Proposed by Initiative Petition
Candidate		Votes	%	±
✓	Yes	1,047,927	51.56%	
	No	984,571	48.44%	

=== Question 5 ===
Law Proposed by Initiative Petition - This initiative sought to would allow retail stores to open at any time on Sundays and on the legal holidays of Memorial Day, July Fourth, and Labor Day. It would not affect the current restrictions on the sale of alcoholic beverages on Sundays and these holidays. Stores governed by the proposal would be required to pay most employees at least one-half times their regular rate.

Law Proposed by Initiative Petition
Candidate		Votes	%	±
✓	Yes	1,100,994	52.65%	
	No	990,057	47.35%	

=== Question 6 ===
Constitutional Amendment Proposed by Initiative Petition - This initiative sought to amend the state constitution so as to require Massachusetts income tax rates to be graduated, in order to distribute the burden of the tax fairly and equitably. The proposed amendment would require the rates for taxpayers in higher income brackets to be higher than the rates for taxpayers in lower income brackets. The proposed amendment would also allow the state Legislature to grant reasonable exemptions and abatements and establish the number and range of tax brackets. The proposed amendment would eliminate from the Massachusetts Constitution the present requirement that income taxes must be levied at a uniform rate throughout the state upon incomes derived from the same class of property.

Constitutional Amendment Proposed by Initiative Petition
Candidate		Votes	%	±
	Yes	630,694	30.42%	
✓	No	1,442,404	69.58%	

=== Question 7 ===
Law Proposed by Initiative Petition - This initiative sought to change the state personal income tax laws if a proposed amendment to the Massachusetts Constitution requiring income tax rates to be graduated is approved at the 1994 state election.

Law Proposed by Initiative Petition
Candidate		Votes	%	±
	Yes	599,917	29.10%	
✓	No	1,461,950	70.90%	

=== Question 8 ===
Law Proposed by Initiative Petition - This initiative sought to increase the portion of the gasoline tax revenue that would be credited to the state Highway Fund; prohibit the transfer of money from the Highway Fund to other state funds for other purposes; declare that citizens have a right to a safe and efficient public highway, road and bridge system and require the state to develop a comprehensive seven-year state transportation plan; and make certain other changes in state finance laws relating to the Highway Fund.

Law Proposed by Initiative Petition
Candidate		Votes	%	±
✓	Yes	1,500,238	74.01%	
	No	526,809	25.99%	

=== Question 9 ===
Law Proposed by Initiative Petition - This initiative sought to prohibit rent control for most privately owned housing unites in Massachusetts, and would nullify certain existing rent control laws, except that cities and towns would be authorized to adopt a restricted form of rent control for a six-month period, after which compliance by property owners would be voluntary.

Law Proposed by Initiative Petition
Candidate		Votes	%	±
✓	Yes	1,034,599	51.34%	
	No	980,736	48.66%	
