= Warren Tolman =

American politician

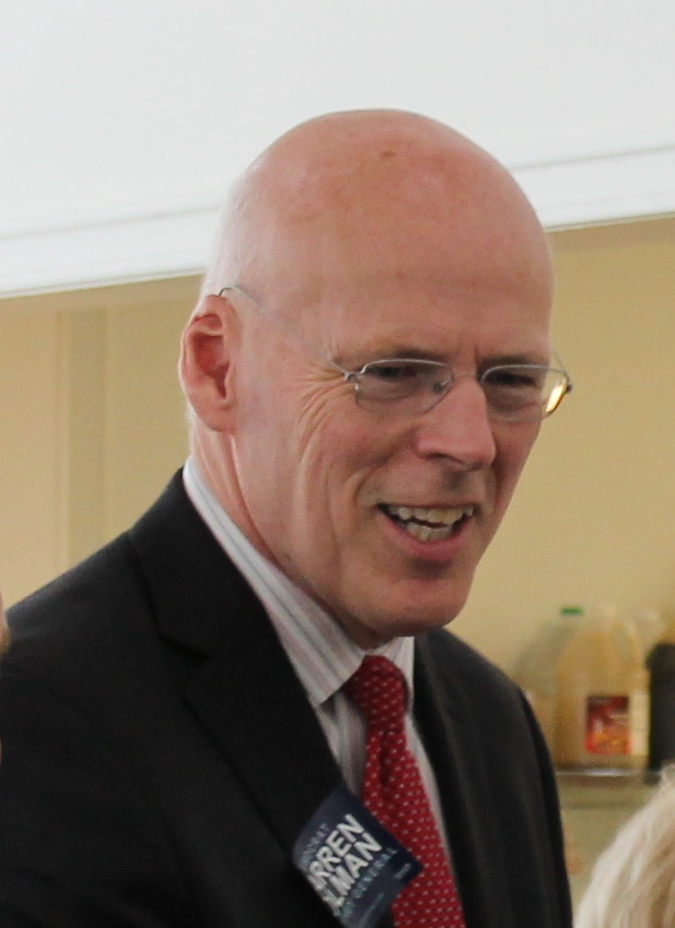
- Tolman in 2014

Member of the Massachusetts Senate from the Middlesex and Suffolk district
- In office January 4, 1995 – January 6, 1999
- Preceded by: Michael J. Barrett
- Succeeded by: Steven Tolman

Member of the Massachusetts House of Representatives from the 32nd Middlesex district
- In office January 2, 1991 – January 4, 1995
- Preceded by: John C. Bartley
- Succeeded by: Rachel Kaprielian

Personal details
- Born: Warren Eugene Tolman; October 23, 1959 (age 67) Boston, Massachusetts, U.S.
- Party: Democratic
- Spouse: Carolyn Tolman
- Children: 3
- Education: Amherst College (BA); Boston College (JD)

Warren Eugene Tolman (born October 23, 1959) is an American politician who has served as a member of both houses of the Massachusetts state legislature. He was the Democratic nominee for Lieutenant Governor of Massachusetts in 1998, and was a candidate for Governor of Massachusetts in 2002, and Massachusetts Attorney General in 2014.

== Legal and political career ==
The seventh of eight children and first in his family to graduate from college, Tolman received a Bachelor's Degree in Economics from Amherst College and a Juris Doctor from Boston College Law School. Between college and law school, Tolman worked as a United Parcel Service driver and as a substitute teacher in the Watertown Public Schools. He was elected to the Massachusetts House of Representatives in 1990 and the Massachusetts Senate in 1994. As a lawmaker, Tolman worked on tightening campaign finance laws and ethics statutes and was a leader in the 1990s movement to curb tobacco use and oppose the political influence of the cigarette industry. During his time in the Court, Tolman became known for his criticism of the Big Dig and his conflicts with House Speaker Thomas Finneran. In 1998, Tolman ran for lieutenant governor as the running mate of Democratic nominee Scott Harshbarger. Though Harshbarger lost to Republican Paul Cellucci, Tolman was cited as an asset to his campaign. From 1987 to 1999 he was an attorney with Burns & Levinson LLP.

In 2002, he became an Of Counsel for Holland & Knight. He has argued in court for reforms of the indigent defense law in Massachusetts. He routinely appears as a political pundit on the Fox 25 Morning News. He left the law firm in 2013 and became Senior Vice President for EnTrust Global.

== 2002 gubernatorial election ==
Tolman ran for governor in 2002 on a platform that included reform of the Big Dig project and a single-payer state health care program. However, he attracted the most attention for his efforts in regard to Massachusetts's Clean Elections law, which had been passed by a 2-1 margin in 1998 by Massachusetts voters and was not funded by the legislature.

Tolman was a plaintiff on a lawsuit, ultimately successful, to force the state to provide funding under the law. In order to be eligible for public campaign financing in case the law passed, he abided by its mandates limiting campaign contributions to no more than $100. He had previously supported the law as a senator. It was eventually repealed. Tolman has since ascribed some of his electoral difficulties to the delay in funding.

== 2014 Attorney General campaign ==
On November 7, 2013, Tolman declared his candidacy for the office of Massachusetts Attorney General. He has vowed to unleash smart gun technology in Massachusetts, saving lives from accidental gun shootings, curbing illegal gun trafficking, and protecting police officers from having their gun turned against them. In December, Tolman penned an op-ed in the Boston Globe announcing his intention to use the state’s consumer protection statute to require gun manufacturers to utilize existing personalized gun technology for all weapons sold in the Commonwealth.

Tolman prioritized bringing colleges and universities together to take action on campus sexual assault, standing up for consumers, and ending the state's opiate abuse crisis. He would enhance the Attorney General’s focus on domestic violence with the creation of an Office on Violence Against Women within the Civil Rights Division, tasked with implementing law enforcement and prevention policies and providing oversight and leadership in the effort to end violence against women. In June, Warren Tolman earned the endorsement of the Massachusetts Democratic Party at the annual state convention.

Tolman faced off against former Assistant Attorney General Maura Healey in the primary. Tolman was endorsed by Massachusetts Governor Deval Patrick and Boston Mayor Marty Walsh as well as all four living former Massachusetts Attorneys General. Tolman was defeated by Healey in the primary election and Healey went on to become Massachusetts Attorney General. Tolman endorsed Healey after the primary and campaigned for her.

== Personal life ==
Tolman grew up in Watertown, Massachusetts in a working-class family and attended public schools in Watertown, MA, including Watertown High School.

His father, David, served in the U.S. Navy during World War II and later worked as a railroad conductor for 40 years. His mother, Marie, worked part-time as a telephone operator while taking care of her 8 children. They begin their family in Boston Public Housing at Fidelis Way in Brighton. Former Massachusetts State Senator and Massachusetts AFL-CIO President Steven Tolman is his brother.

Tolman is married to his high school sweetheart and fellow Watertown native Carolyn Tolman; they have three children.

Party political offices
| Preceded by Bob Massie | Democratic nominee for Lieutenant Governor of Massachusetts; 1998 | Succeeded by Chris Gabrieli |
