= Joseph P. Kennedy II =

American businessman and politician (born 1952)

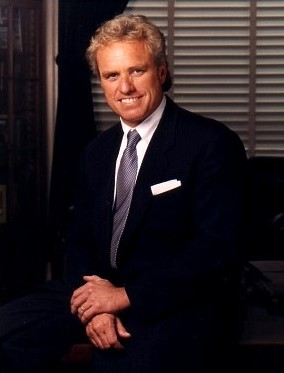
- Kennedy, c. 1987

Member of the U.S. House of Representatives from Massachusetts's 8th district
- In office January 3, 1987 – January 3, 1999
- Preceded by: Tip O'Neill
- Succeeded by: Mike Capuano

Personal details
- Born: Joseph Patrick Kennedy II; September 24, 1952 (age 74) Boston, Massachusetts, U.S.
- Party: Democratic
- Spouses: Sheila Brewster Rauch (m. 1979; div. 1991) Anne Kelly (m. 1993)
- Children: 2, including Joe
- Parent(s): Robert F. Kennedy (father); Ethel Skakel (mother)
- Relatives: Kennedy family
- Education: University of Massachusetts Boston (BA)

Joseph Patrick Kennedy II (born September 24, 1952) is an American businessman, Democratic politician, and a member of the Kennedy family. He is the eldest son of former U.S. Attorney General Robert F. Kennedy and Ethel Kennedy, and a nephew of former U.S. President John F. Kennedy and former U.S. Senator Ted Kennedy. He is also the older brother of U.S. Secretary of Health and Human Services Robert F. Kennedy Jr.

Kennedy served as a member of the U.S. House of Representatives from the 8th congressional district of Massachusetts from 1987 to 1999. In 1979 he founded and, until he was elected to the U.S. House, led Citizens Energy Corporation, a nonprofit energy company that provides heating oil to low-income and elderly families in Massachusetts.

== Early life, family and education ==
Kennedy was born in the Brighton section of Boston on September 24, 1952. He was the second of 11 children to Ethel (née Skakel) and Robert F. Kennedy. He was named after his grandfather Joseph P. Kennedy Sr., the patriarch of the Kennedy family, and his uncle Joseph P. Kennedy Jr., who was killed in an airplane crash in 1944 during World War II. (Note: Some early sources misidentified him as Joseph P. Kennedy III, assuming he was named for his uncle Joseph P. Kennedy Jr., rather than his grandfather. He clarified the issue during his run for Congress.) He is the eldest grandson of Joseph and Rose Kennedy. Kennedy spent his childhood between the family's homes in McLean, Virginia, and Hyannis Port, Massachusetts.

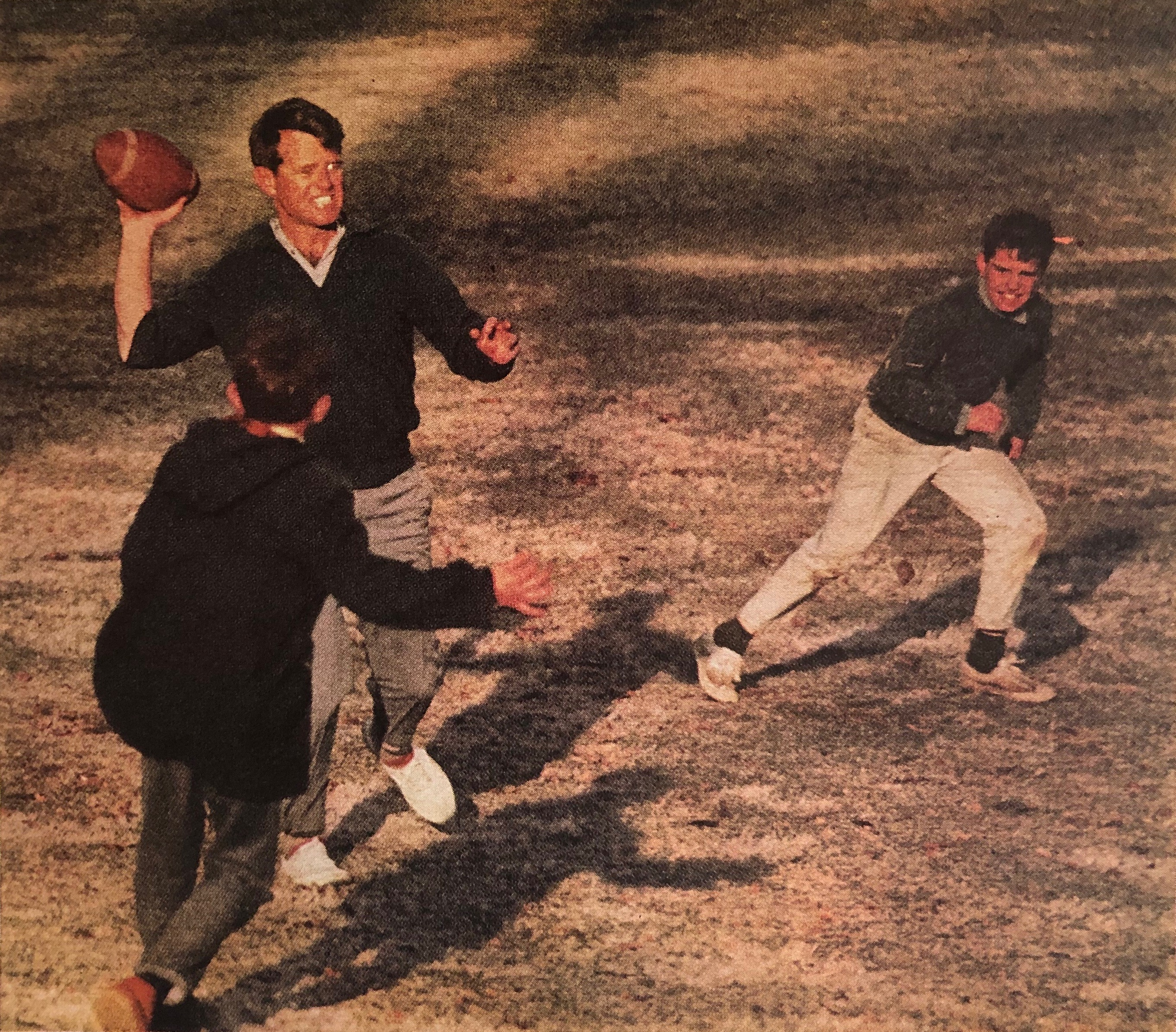
Kennedy (right) playing football with his father, 1963

Kennedy had a troubled youth and was expelled from several private schools as a result of his quick temper. He regularly got into fights with his younger brothers and male cousins. He was 15 when his father was assassinated at the Ambassador Hotel. That night, Kennedy and two of his siblings, Kathleen and Robert Jr., were flying to Los Angeles aboard one of the planes in the Secret Service's presidential fleet.

Kennedy dropped out of Milton Academy, a preparatory boarding school in Milton, Massachusetts, when he was not allowed to take time off to work on his uncle Ted's 1970 Senate campaign. He finished his high school studies at Manter Hall, a tutoring school in Cambridge, Massachusetts, in 1971. At Milton, he was a roommate of Thomas C. Wales.

Kennedy attended the University of California, Berkeley in 1972, but dropped out. He returned to school after a major car accident in 1973 and graduated with a Bachelor of Arts degree from the University of Massachusetts Boston in 1976.

== Early career ==
While on hiatus from college, Kennedy worked for several months as part of a federally funded program to combat and treat tuberculosis in San Francisco's African American community. Mayor Joseph Alioto personally praised Kennedy's work in the community. Kennedy resigned from his position in the program and returned to Massachusetts in the summer of 1973.

In 1979, Kennedy founded Citizens Energy Corporation, a nonprofit organization to provide discounted heating oil to low-income families and older adults in Massachusetts. According to author J. Randy Taraborrelli, Kennedy started the venture "to alleviate the burden of heating bills for the poor during the oil crisis of that year". By 1984, Citizens Energy helped provide low-cost heat for 250,000 families. In 2010, Kennedy transformed the organization to become a leader in renewable energy generation while continuing to use profits to provide energy savings to low-income families.

== U.S. House of Representatives (1987–1999) ==
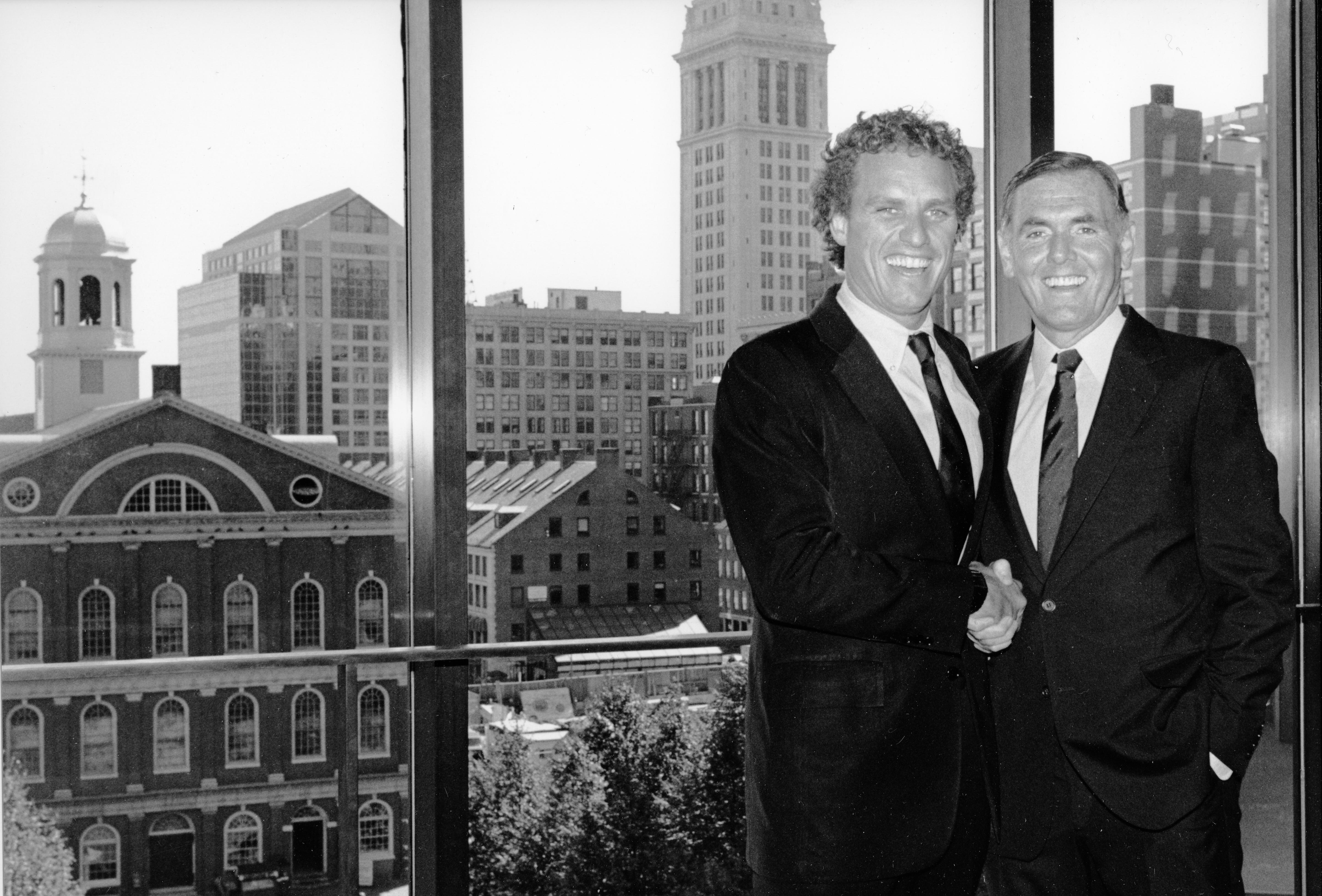
Kennedy (left) with Boston Mayor Raymond Flynn in the 1980s

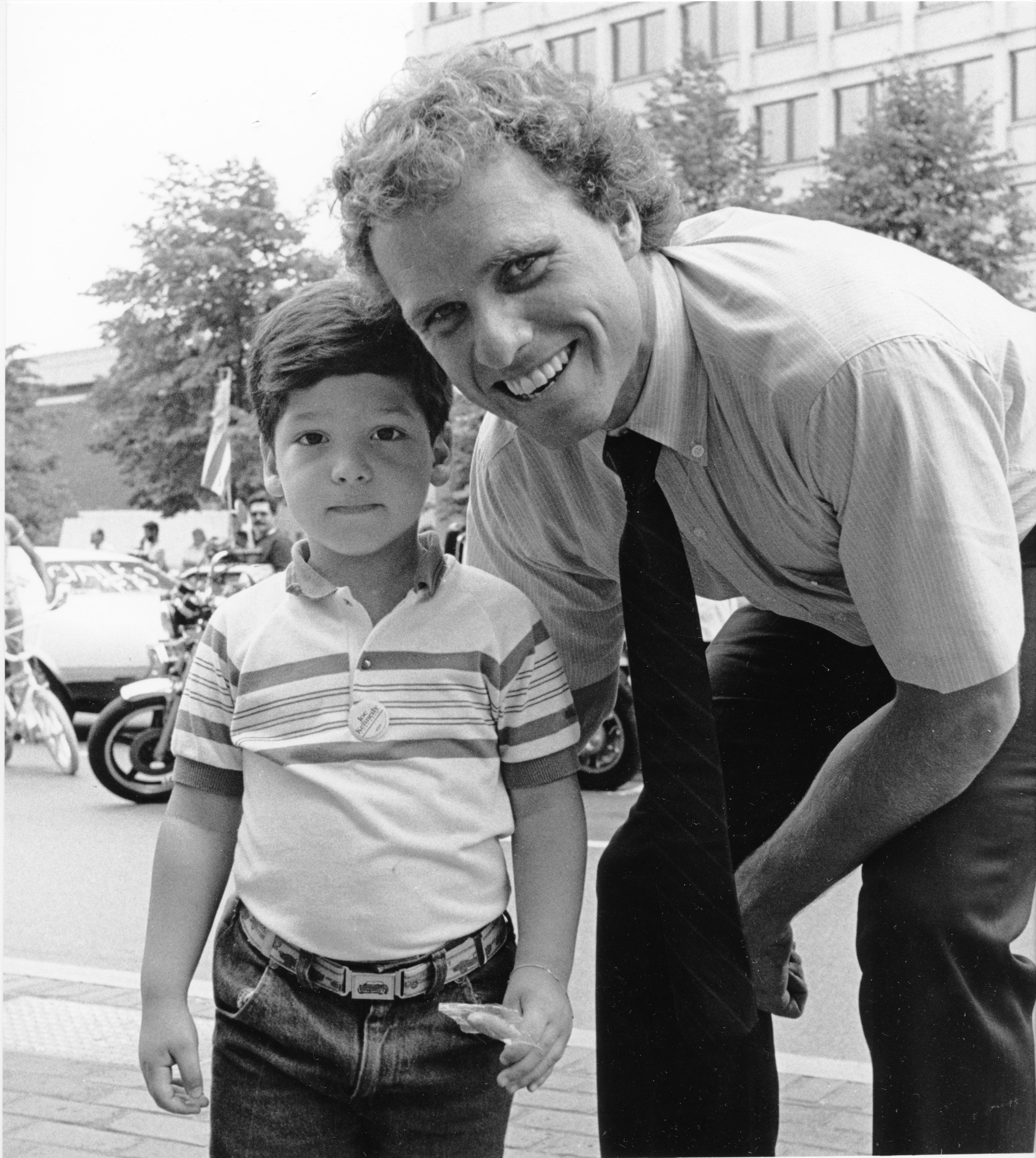
Kennedy with a child in Boston, 1980s

=== Elections ===
In 1986, incumbent Democrat and Speaker of the House Tip O'Neill, who had held the seat for Massachusetts's 8th congressional district (a Democratic stronghold in Boston and Cambridge, Massachusetts) since 1953, announced his retirement. Kennedy ran for the seat, which his uncle John F. Kennedy had held from 1947 to 1953. The Democratic nomination was contested by several well-known Democrats, including state senator George Bachrach and state representative Mel King. Kennedy was endorsed by The Boston Globe and by O'Neill. He won the primary with 53% of the vote, and the general election with 72%. He was reelected in 1988, 1990, 1992, 1994, and 1996.

=== Tenure ===
Kennedy's legislative efforts in the U.S. House of Representatives included:

- Expanding the availability of credit to working Americans to buy homes and to open businesses.
- Requiring public disclosure of bank-lending practices in poorer neighborhoods and disclosure of bank home-mortgage approvals and refusals by race, sex, and income. Subsequent Federal Reserve Board studies based on these newly required disclosures found widespread evidence of discriminatory-loan practices. One study found that white borrowers in the lowest-income category were approved for mortgages more than African American borrowers in the highest-income category. Data from Boston, Chicago, and Minneapolis found that African Americans were turned down at three times the rate of whites.
- Helping create hundreds of thousands of new affordable-housing units nationwide by introducing tax credits to stimulate private investment in neighborhood housing developments after federal housing assistance had been cut by 75% during the 1980s.
- Chairing the House Banking subcommittee on consumer credit and insurance and holding the first U.S. congressional hearings to expose the lack of access to insurance in low-income neighborhoods.
- Proposing a balanced-budget amendment to the U.S. Constitution as a vehicle to end skyrocketing deficits, reduce interest rates, and free up investment capital for business growth rather than government bonds while fighting to end corporate tax breaks and subsidies.
- Overhauling federal public-housing law for the first time in almost 60 years, giving local housing authorities the ability to raise standards while protecting those who depend on public housing for shelter.
- Co-chairing the U.S. congressional biotechnology caucus and proposing to preserve and expand federal research and development accounts that stimulate the creation of new technologies and build the foundation for new jobs and business growth.
- Proposing the "Mom and Pop Protection Act" to help corner-store owners to install safety equipment and a "National Stalker Reduction Act" to require all states to enact comprehensive anti-stalking legislation, track stalkers, and establish a national domestic-violence database to track violations of civil-protection orders.
- Protecting kids from alcohol by proposing to limit television advertising of beer and wine between 7 a.m. and 10 p.m. and to keep outdoor alcohol advertisements away from schools.
- Launching a bipartisan initiative in Massachusetts to fight child hunger that helped lead to an expansion of school breakfast and lunch programs.

In 1988, Kennedy traveled to Northern Ireland. During his stay, the Democratic Unionist Party called him a "republican parrot". He also had a well-publicized encounter with a British soldier who suggested that Kennedy return home. In 1991, Kennedy boycotted a speech to the U.S. Congress by the United Kingdom's Queen Elizabeth II "in protest to the British occupation in Northern Ireland".

In March 1998, after a year of family troubles that included the skiing death of his brother Michael LeMoyne Kennedy, he announced that he planned to retire from the House, citing "a new recognition of our own vulnerabilities and the vagaries of life". The Boston Globe wrote in an editorial, "Kennedy has remained steadfast in his political life to issues and constituencies no poll would have led him to: the poor, the homeless, disadvantaged children, and others swamped in the current tide of prosperity." He served six House terms, until January 1999. In his final speech on the U.S. House floor, Kennedy delivered "an impassioned plea for unity and forgiveness" amid Congressional debate about articles of impeachment of President Bill Clinton.

=== Committee assignments ===
Throughout his House career, Kennedy served on the House Banking Committee, where he played an active role in the federal saving-and-loan bailout, credit-reporting reform, the overhaul of the Glass–Steagall Act of 1933, and financial modernization. Kennedy also served on the House Veterans' Affairs Committee, passing legislation to strengthen the veterans' health-care system, to investigate the causes of Gulf War syndrome, and to provide medical treatment for veterans of the Persian Gulf War.

== Citizens Energy (since 1999) ==
=== Overview ===
After leaving the House of Representatives, Kennedy returned to Citizens Energy. (During Kennedy's terms in the House, it had been run by his brother Michael.) Citizens Energy pursues commercial ventures aimed at generating revenues that, in turn, are used to generate funds that could assist those in need in the U.S. and abroad. It grew to encompass seven separate companies, including one of the largest energy-conservation firms in the U.S. Citizens Energy became one of the first U.S. energy firms to move large volumes of natural gas to more than 30 states. As a precursor to market changes under electricity deregulation in the late 1990s, Citizens Energy was a pioneer in moving and marketing electrical power over the power grid. In recent years, Kennedy has led the company into the renewable-energy industry, building solar farms along the East Coast and transmission lines to support charitable programs like one giving free solar panels to low-income families in California. In 2019, Citizens Energy announced the completion of one of the largest Low-Income Community Shared Solar projects in the country, funded by its investment in the Sunrise PowerLink Transmission line. Totaling 30 megawatts, the project will provide $500 in energy savings to 12,000 low-income families annually.

=== Public policy ===
Since returning to Citizens Energy, Kennedy has sought to influence energy-related public policy, challenging the Bush administration to invest in energy conservation and efficiency and renewable energy, encouraging Congress to fully fund federal heating assistance programs, proposing that oil-consuming countries work together to balance oil prices against OPEC manipulation, and calling for the federal government and major oil companies to use portions of royalties from oil and gas extracted from federal lands and waters to help low-income families with the high price of energy. Kennedy has been criticized for the salaries paid to himself and his wife. In 2012, as CEO of Citizens Energy and related organizations, he received $796,000 in compensation, and his wife received $344,000 as Director of Marketing.

=== Venezuela ===
Beginning in 2005, Citgo Petroleum Company (Citgo), a wholly owned subsidiary of Petróleos de Venezuela (PDVSA)—the Venezuelan state-owned oil company—has been Citizens Energy's primary donor of heating oil. The Wall Street Journal and others criticized Citizens Energy for continuing its relationship with the Venezuelan government and Venezuelan president Hugo Chávez, a harsh critic of the United States. In response, Kennedy and others argued that it is hypocritical to criticize a nonprofit organization for accepting oil from Venezuela while numerous U.S. businesses profit from robust trade with Venezuela and when the U.S. government has cut low-income fuel assistance.

Although Citgo donations reportedly dried up in 2015 owing to Venezuela's economic turmoil, the company was reported in 2009 to have donated 83 million gallons of oil over the two previous years, which was used to provide heating assistance to an estimated 200,000 families a year in 23 states.

Kennedy later became a critic of Venezuelan president Nicolás Maduro, Chávez's handpicked successor, accusing him of "stealing democracy from the people" and calling for his removal.

== Later political considerations ==
=== Gubernatorial elections ===
In 1993, a Boston Globe poll showed Kennedy within one percentage point of popular incumbent William Weld in a hypothetical gubernatorial match-up, prompting prominent state Democrats to try to recruit him for the race. Though no other Democrat was polling near Weld, Kennedy decided to forgo the race and remain in Congress. Mark Roosevelt won the nomination and lost to Weld by over 40 points.

Kennedy was considered the front-runner for the governorship of Massachusetts in 1998, but revelations about his personal life led to a tumultuous fall in public opinion polling, and he decided not to run. At a VFW hall in a working-class area of Boston, he said he believed the campaign would not focus on policy: "The race will focus on personal or family questions. It is not fair to my family, it is not fair to the people of Massachusetts, and it is not the right thing to do."

=== 2010 U.S. Senate election ===
After his uncle Ted Kennedy died on August 25, 2009, Kennedy was mentioned as a possible candidate for his uncle's United States Senate seat. In an Associated Press article, Democratic strategist Dan Payne said, "He wouldn't be human and he wouldn't be a Kennedy if he didn't give serious consideration to running for what is known as the 'Kennedy seat' in Massachusetts." On September 7, Kennedy announced that he would not pursue the seat. The seat eventually went by appointment to Paul G. Kirk and later by election to Republican Scott Brown.

=== Endorsements ===
Kennedy endorsed incumbent Democrat Joe Biden's reelection campaign in the 2024 United States presidential election over a third-party/independent challenge by his brother Robert Jr.

== Personal life ==
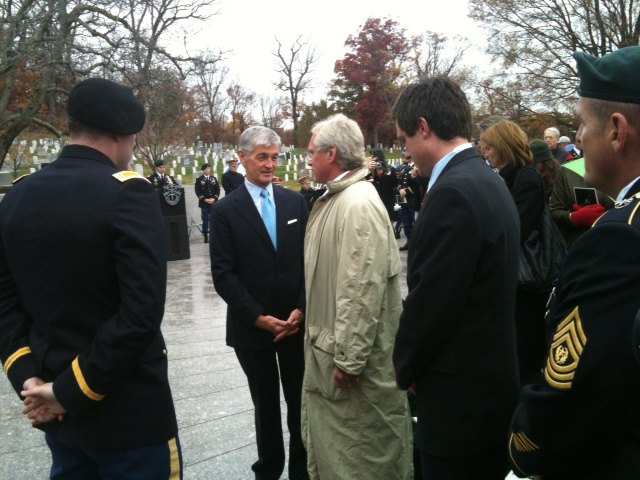
Kennedy (center) attends a wreath-laying ceremony to honor President John F. Kennedy at Arlington National Cemetery, November 2011

On February 22, 1972, Kennedy was on Lufthansa Flight 649 when it was hijacked. Shortly after the inflight movie began during the flight from New Delhi to Athens, five gunmen seized the jet and forced it to land at Aden International Airport, where all hostages were released the next day.

=== Pamela Kelley ===
In August 1973, a Jeep Kennedy was driving recklessly on Nantucket overturned, fracturing a vertebra of his brother David and permanently paralyzing David's girlfriend, Pamela Kelley, from the chest down. According to her sister Karen, Kelley was told she would never have children and would likely die by age 40.

The police cited Kennedy for reckless driving and the judge temporarily suspended his driver's license. Kennedy was fined $100 for negligent driving and paid an insurance settlement reported to be $668,000.

The Kennedy family paid for Kelley's initial medical treatment and contributed modestly to her care during the years after the accident. In 2005, she went to the press to complain of the lack of financial support from Joseph Kennedy. According to her reckoning, she had received $50,000 beyond the initial insurance payout. After that, Joseph Kennedy paid Kelley $2000 a month, later increased to $2,500. After her death, Karen Kelley said that Pamela could have lived more comfortably if the Kennedys had provided more money for her medical needs.

Pamela Kelley was a founding member of former president of CORD (Cape Organization for the Rights of the Disabled) and advocated for greater access for disabled people in Cape Cod. She died on November 20, 2020, aged 65.

=== Marriages and reversed annulment ===
On February 3, 1979, Kennedy married Sheila Brewster Rauch, a daughter of banker Rudolph Stewart "Stew" Rauch Jr., president and then chairman of the Philadelphia Savings Fund Society. On October 4, 1980, the couple had fraternal twin sons, Matthew Rauch "Matt" Kennedy and Joseph Patrick "Joe" Kennedy III. They divorced in 1991.

In 1993, Kennedy asked the Catholic Archdiocese of Boston for an annulment of his marriage to Rauch, claiming he was mentally incapable of entering into marriage at the time of the wedding. An annulment would have rendered the marriage void in the Church and would have allowed Kennedy to marry Anne Elizabeth "Beth" Kelly, a former staff member of his, in a Catholic ceremony, and to continue receiving Holy Communion (which is forbidden for a divorced person who remarries outside the Church). Rauch refused to agree to the annulment; Kennedy married Kelly in a non-Catholic civil ceremony on October 23, 1993.

The Boston Archdiocese initially ruled in favor of the annulment, which Rauch says she discovered only after the fact, in 1996. An Episcopalian, she later wrote a book, Shattered Faith: A Woman's Struggle to Stop the Catholic Church from Annulling Her Marriage, in which she said she opposed the annulment because in Catholic theology it means the marriage had never actually existed. She also said the Kennedy family influence had made it possible to unilaterally "cancel" a 12-year marriage.

Catholic canon law at the time required a tribunal decision in favor of annulment to be automatically appealed, and the decision was not effective until a second, conforming sentence was granted. Instead of allowing the appeal to take place in the United States, Rauch appealed directly to the Roman Rota, the highest appellate tribunal of the Catholic Church. The Rota overturned the annulment in 2005, but Rauch says she was informed only in 2007, by Boston Archdiocese officials. As the first decision was never confirmed, there was no time at which the Church finally annulled the marriage or gave Kennedy permission to remarry. Because the Rota was sitting as a second-instance appellate court, Kennedy could appeal the decision to another Rotal panel.

== Notes ==
U.S. House of Representatives
Preceded by Tip O'Neill	Member of the U.S. House of Representatives from Massachusetts's 8th congressional district 1987–1999	Succeeded by Mike Capuano
U.S. order of precedence (ceremonial)
Preceded by Lynn Westmoreland as Former U.S. Representative	Order of precedence of the United States as Former U.S. Representative	Succeeded by Niki Tsongas as Former U.S. Representative
