= Patricia McGovern =

Politician in Massachusetts, US

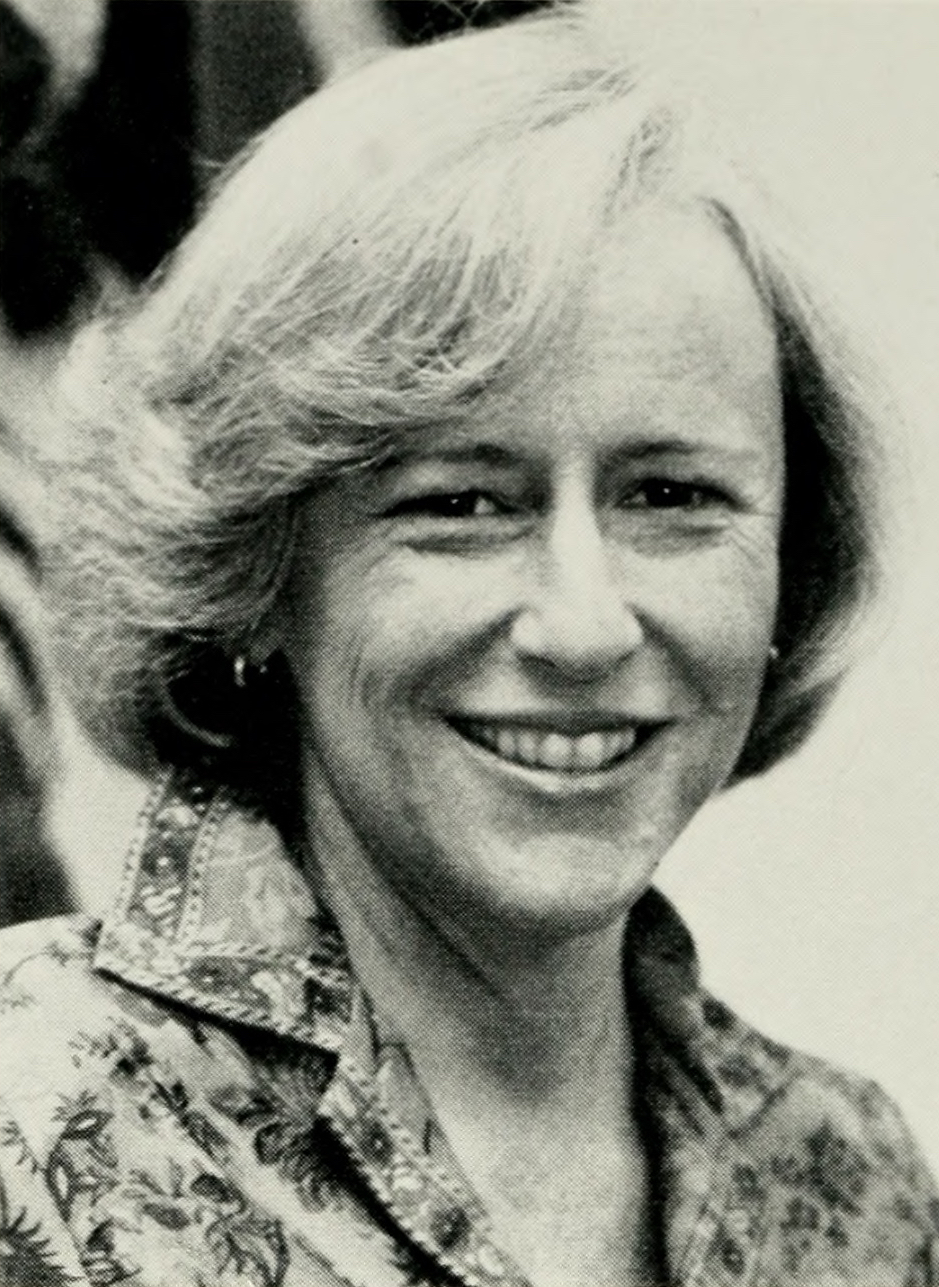
- McGovern c. 1991

Member of the Massachusetts Senate from the 2nd Essex and Middlesex district
- In office 1981–1993
- Preceded by: William X. Wall
- Succeeded by: John D. O'Brien

Chairman of the Massachusetts Senate Ways and Means Committee
- In office 1985–1993
- Preceded by: Chester G. Atkins
- Succeeded by: Thomas Birmingham

Patricia McGovern is an attorney and former Democratic Massachusetts State Senator from Lawrence, Massachusetts. She was formerly the General Counsel and Senior Vice President for Corporate and Community Affairs at Beth Israel Deaconess Medical Center.

== Biography ==
McGovern holds a bachelor's degree and law degree from Suffolk University. She also studied at The Hague Academy of International Law.

McGovern served in the Massachusetts Senate for 12 years, from 1981 to 1993, and was the first woman to chair the powerful Massachusetts Senate Committee on Ways and Means. While the Chair of that Committee McGovern was the principal architect of the first serious effort in Massachusetts to enact a universal health insurance law. Under her stewardship, such a law was enacted in 1988 – with the controversial inclusion of a payroll tax – but the law was never implemented by the newly elected Governor of the Commonwealth, the Republican William Weld, because of his opposition to the payroll tax. However, Michael Dukakis used the enactment of the universal health care law on the campaign trail in his run for the U.S. Presidency, notwithstanding that McGovern had done most of the hard lifting in getting it enacted.

In 1998 McGovern sought the Democratic nomination for Governor of Massachusetts but lost to Scott Harshbarger. She received 31 percent of the vote.

McGovern has also served as Executive Vice President for External Affairs at CareGroup Healthcare System and practiced law at the Boston law firm of Goulston & Storrs. In addition, she was the executive director of the Governor's Committee on Law Enforcement and the Administration of Justice in the Executive Office of Public Safety, and has participated in a number of Blue Ribbon Committees and Commissions, including most recently the Transportation Finance Commission. She became senior vice president for corporate and community affairs at Beth Israel Deaconess Medical Center and also became its general counsel in 2005 before stepping down in 2012.

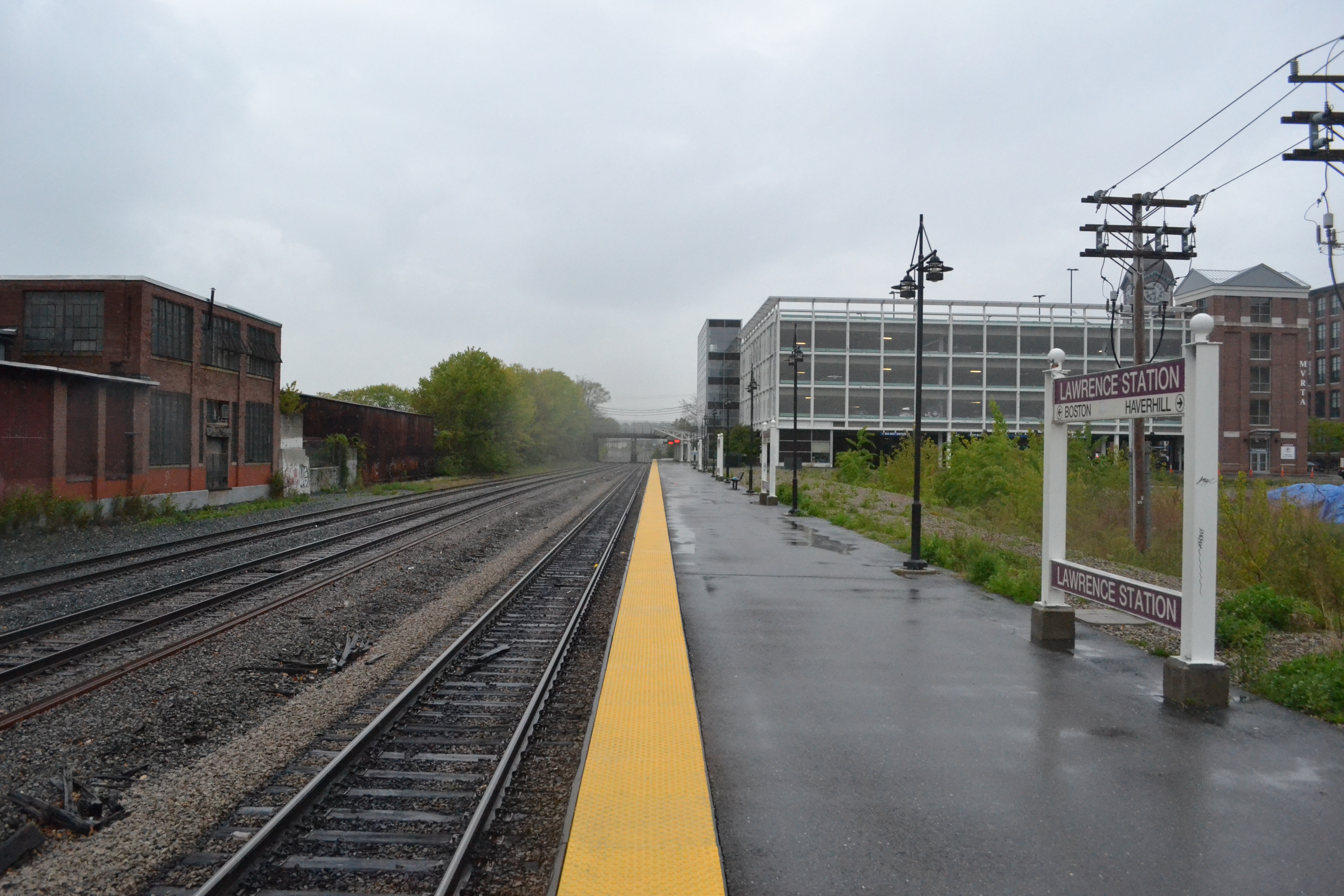
Station platform at the 2005-built Senator Patricia McGovern Transportation Center in Lawrence, Massachusetts.

The Senator Patricia McGovern Transportation Center in Lawrence, Massachusetts is named for the former senator. The center, which opened in 2005, is a bus and train station serving Lawrence and the neighboring towns of Andover and North Andover.

== See also ==
- Massachusetts Senate's 2nd Essex and Middlesex district

Political offices
Preceded by Chester G. Atkins	Chairman of the Massachusetts Senate Ways and Means Committee; 1985–1993	Succeeded by Thomas Birmingham
