= Massachusetts Academy of Math and Science at WPI =

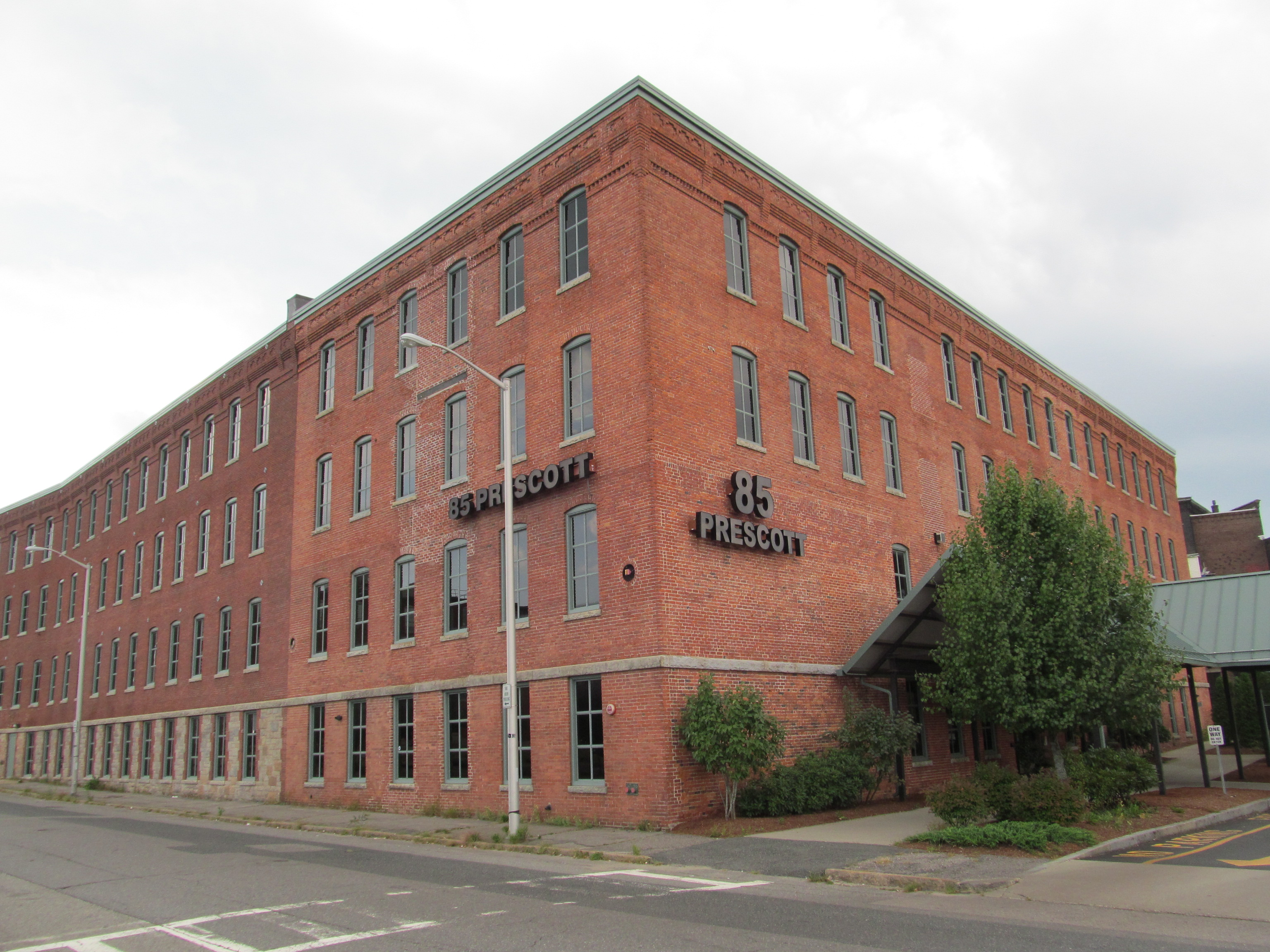

Location
- 85 Prescott Street; Worcester, Massachusetts; United States; 42°17′18.55″N 71°47′59.19″W

Information
- Type: Public Magnet
- Established: 1992
- Founder: Arthur E. Chase
- Director: Ted McCarthy
- Grades: 11 - 12
- Enrollment: approx. 100
- Colors: Maroon and gray
- Website: www.massacademy.org

The Massachusetts Academy of Math and Science at WPI (Mass Academy/MAMS) is a public, non-residential magnet school in Worcester, Massachusetts, to serve academically advanced youth in grades eleven and twelve in math, science, and technology.

== Overview ==
The school emphasizes math and science within a comprehensive, interactive program. The rigor of the junior year classes exceeds high school honors and AP, with more than 1200 hours of instruction.

In October 2018, Niche.com selected the Massachusetts Academy of Math and Science as the best public high school in Massachusetts with a student-teacher ratio of 14:1, a diversity grade of A, and a college prep grade of A+.
