= Citizens Energy Corporation =

Non-profit organization

- Formation: 1979
- Headquarters: Boston, Massachusetts, U.S.
- Chief Executive Officer: Peter F. Smith
- President: Joseph P. Kennedy II
- Website: citizensenergy.com

Citizens Energy Corporation is a non-profit organization that primarily aids poor and elderly households in Massachusetts and internationally by organizing projects to provide discounted and free home heating services and supplies. They also construct power generation and transmission systems.

In 1979, using oil-trading ventures in Latin America and Africa, Citizens Energy began taking revenues from commercial enterprises to channel millions of dollars into charitable programs in the US and across the world.

Citizens Energy has created eight separate subsidiaries, Citizens Gas Supply, Citizens Power & Light (now independent as Citizens Lehman Power LP), Citizens Conservation Corporation (sold in 1986), Citizens Heat and Power Company (sold in 1995), Citizens Wind, Citizens Solar, Citizens Health, and Citizens Medical.

Citizens Energy currently provides free home heating oil for the elderly and the poor living in Massachusetts and other cold weather states. In addition, the organization provides a prescription drugs assistance program, and has started solar heating projects in Jamaica and Venezuela. In February 2014, Citgo and the Government of Venezuela launched its ninth annual Heating Oil Program in partnership with Citizens Energy; since its inception in 2005 the program has covered the donation of 235 million gallons of heating oil to 1.8 million Americans. The heating oil contributions from Venezuela ended in 2017. It is currently involved in the construction of power generation and transmission systems.

Its founder and chairman is former Massachusetts Democratic Representative Joseph Patrick Kennedy II, the eldest son of Robert F. Kennedy.
