= Massachusetts International Academy =

Coordinates: 42°21′15″N 71°35′10″W

Massachusetts International Academy (simplified Chinese: 美国麻省国际学院; traditional Chinese: 美國麻省國際學院; pinyin: Měiguó Máshěng Guójì Xuéyuàn) is a college preparatory school positioning high school and university graduates from China for success in United States’ colleges and universities located in Marlborough, Massachusetts. It is the first boarding school designed for Chinese students who intend to attend U.S. universities. MAIA has closed its Marlborough campus (in part, due to COVID-19) as of June 2020.
