= Augusto Grace =

American politician

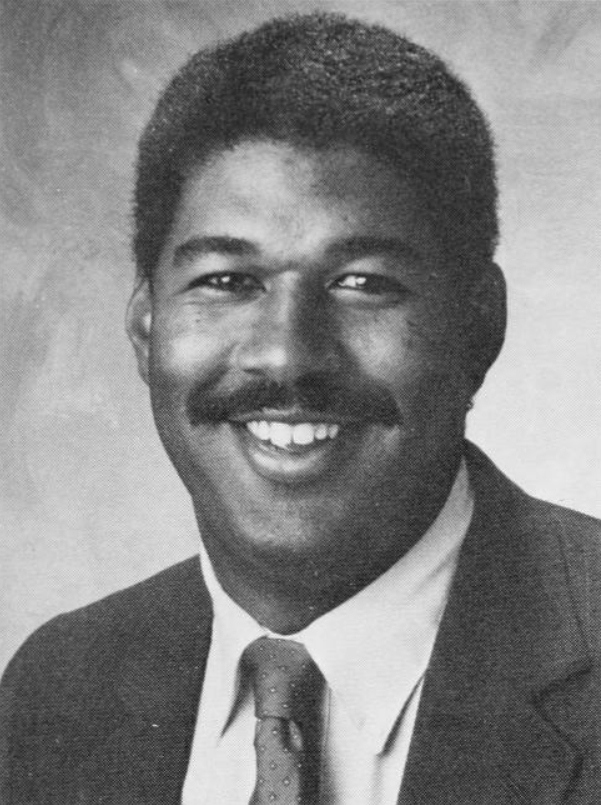

Member of the Massachusetts House of Representatives from the 23rd Middlesex district
- In office January 7, 1987 – January 2, 1991
- Preceded by: Robert Vigneau
- Succeeded by: Marianne Brenton

Personal details
- Born: Augusto Francisco Grace; April 9, 1954 (age 72) North Kingstown, Rhode Island, U.S.
- Party: Democratic
- Education: University of Notre Dame (BA); Boston College (JD)

Augusto Francisco Grace (born April 9, 1954) is an American lawyer and politician who represented the 23rd Middlesex District in the Massachusetts House of Representatives from 1987 to 1991 and the Burlington School Committee from 1977 to 1983.

He was born in North Kingstown, Rhode Island. He graduated from the University of Notre Dame with a Bachelor of Arts degree in 1976 and from Boston College Law School with a Juris Doctor in 1984.

He practiced law in Boston until 2007. From 2007 to 2009 he served as the director of professional development for the Massachusetts Highway Department. From 2009 to 2015 he worked in the Talent Management and Professional Development Division of the Massachusetts Department of Transportation rising to the position of department manager. Since 2015 he has served as the deputy director of education and development at the Massachusetts Department of Transportation. He is a former executive director, president, and treasurer of the National Guard Association of Massachusetts and National Guard Executive Directors Association.

Grace was defeated by Republican Marianne Brenton in the 1990 election. He was a candidate for Secretary of the Commonwealth of Massachusetts in 1994, but lost in the Democratic Primary to William F. Galvin.
