= Scott Harshbarger =

American politician (born 1941)

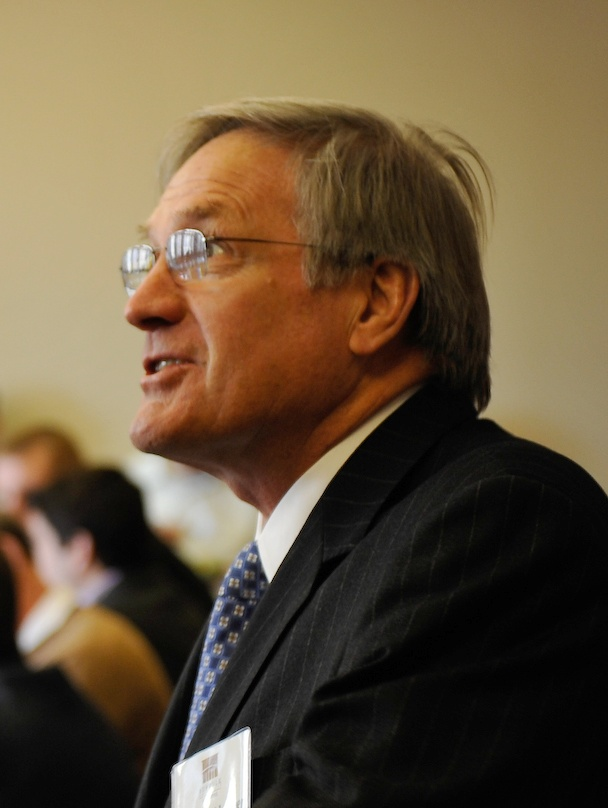
- Harshbarger in 2009

41st Attorney General of Massachusetts
- In office January 3, 1991 – January 7, 1999
- Governor: Bill Weld; Paul Cellucci
- Preceded by: James Shannon
- Succeeded by: Thomas Reilly

Massachusetts District Attorney for the Northern District
- In office 1983–1991
- Preceded by: John J. Droney
- Succeeded by: Thomas Reilly

Personal details
- Born: Luther Scott Harshbarger; December 1, 1941 (age 84) New Haven, Connecticut, U.S.
- Party: Democratic
- Other political affiliations: United Independent (2016–2017)
- Education: Harvard University (AB, JD)

Luther Scott Harshbarger (born December 1, 1941) is an American attorney and Democratic politician. He served as the 56th Massachusetts Attorney General from 1991 to 1999. In 1998, he was the Democratic nominee for Governor of Massachusetts but lost a close race to acting governor Paul Cellucci.

Harshbarger served as senior counsel in the Boston law firm of Casner & Edwards, LLP from 2016 to 2026.

== Early life and education ==
Harshbarger was born in New Haven, Connecticut. He graduated in 1964 from Harvard College, where he was a halfback on the varsity football team. He received a JD degree in 1967 from Harvard Law School.

== Career ==
After law school, Harshbarger worked as a public defender and civil rights attorney.

=== Middlesex District Attorney ===
He was first elected as district attorney of Middlesex County, Massachusetts in 1982, defeating incumbent DA John Droney in the Democratic primary. He was re-elected in 1986.

Harshbarger was elected president of the Massachusetts Association of District Attorneys and was awarded the Livingston Hall Award by the American Bar Association for Harshbarger's outstanding work in Juvenile Justice.

=== Attorney general ===
In 1990, he was elected attorney general of Massachusetts, defeating incumbent James Shannon in the Democratic primary. He was re-elected in 1994 with 70 percent of the vote. Harshbarger was one of the first attorneys general in the nation to sue the tobacco industry for manufacturing a product, cigarettes, which causes disease and death when used as designed by the industry. Harshbarger was elected president of the National Attorneys General Association.

=== Gubernatorial bid ===
He was the Democratic nominee for Governor of Massachusetts in the 1998 gubernatorial election. He lost in a close race to incumbent Republican Governor Cellucci. Afterwards, Harshbarger served as president of the public interest organization Common Cause for three years, where he supported efforts to pass the Bipartisan Campaign Reform Act.

=== Changing party ===
In June, 2016 Harshbarger announced that he would be leaving the Democratic Party to join the United Independent Party to assist them in reaching the voter enrollment necessary to remain a recognized party in Massachusetts. After a year, he returned to the Democratic Party.

=== Return to private legal practice ===
Since 2003, Harshbarger has practiced law in the private sector, focusing on corporate governance and related issues. He is currently senior counsel in the Boston law firm of Casner & Edwards, LLP. Prior to joining Casner & Edwards, Harshbarger was senior counsel at Proskauer Rose LLP in Boston, MA. Harshbarger has continued to serve the Commonwealth of Massachusetts as a private practice attorney by accepting appointments by both Republican and Democratic governors of Massachusetts. He has chaired the Probation Reform Commission and Correctional Reform Commission. He also serves as member of the MA Supreme Judicial Court management advisory board, and is regular commentator on regional and national television.

== Personal life ==
Harshbarger is married to Judith Stephenson. They have five children.

Legal offices
Preceded by Jim Shannon	Attorney General of Massachusetts; 1991–1999	Succeeded by Tom Reilly
Party political offices
Preceded by Jim Shannon	Democratic nominee for Attorney General of Massachusetts; 1990, 1994	Succeeded by Tom Reilly
Preceded by Mark Roosevelt	Democratic nominee for Governor of Massachusetts; 1998	Succeeded by Shannon O'Brien
