= List of superdelegates at the 2008 Democratic National Convention =

State vote totals respective to the number of superdelegates that correspond to that candidate.

This is a list of Democratic party unpledged delegates, also known as superdelegates or automatic delegates, who voted in the 2008 Democratic National Convention, the culmination of the party's presidential nominating process that began with the 2008 Democratic Party presidential primaries and caucuses.

At the time of Hillary Clinton's campaign suspension on June 7, 2008, the count was 246½ for her and 478 for Barack Obama, with 99 still 'Uncommitted' of the 823½ total then existing, although this number represents the realignment of around 50 superdelegates who switched their support from Clinton to Obama when he had gained the majority of delegates. Clinton released her delegates during the convention.

The breakdown by position for Clinton was 144 DNC, 52½ Representatives, 14 Senators, 17 Add-ons, 10½ Governors, and 7½ DPLs; the breakdown by position for Obama was 229 DNC, 157 Representatives, 34 Senators, 29 Add-ons, 20 Governors, and 9 DPLs; and the breakdown for "Uncommitted" was: 39 DNC, 22 Representatives, 1.5 Senators, 32.5 Add-ons, 1 Governor, and 3 DPLs.

== Composition ==
The Democratic Party's official rules do not use the term "superdelegate." This is an informal name for about 20% of all delegates, whose status as delegates is independent of primary and caucus results and who are officially unpledged to any candidate. About half of the superdelegates are current Democratic elected officials – Governors, U.S. Senators and Representatives. The other half consists of other party leaders.

The following totals reflect the fact that superdelegates from Florida and Michigan will be seated at the convention, but with only one-half vote each, because of their states' violations of scheduling rules.

=== Unpledged party leaders and elected officials ===
The formal description (in Rule 9.A) is "unpledged party leader and elected official delegates" (Unpledged PLEOs).

- 19.5 votes from 20 Distinguished Party Leaders (DPL). Officially there are 23 delegates in this category, but this includes sitting elected officials (2 Senators and 1 Governor), who are here counted in those categories. Former party Chairman Kenneth M. Curtis (FL) has 0.5 vote.
- 31.5 votes from 32 Democratic Governors. This category includes 28 state Governors, the Mayor of DC, and 3 Governors of Territories. Michigan Gov. Jennifer Granholm has 0.5 vote.
- 49.5 votes from 51 members of the Senate. This category includes 49 U.S. Senators and the 2 Shadow Senators from DC. The 3 Senators from Michigan and Florida have only 0.5 vote each.
- 231.5 votes from 238 members of the House of Representatives. This category includes 234 Representatives from the states, and 4 Congressional Delegates from DC and from the Territories. The 15 Michigan and Florida Representatives have only 0.5 vote each.
- 413 votes from 432 Democratic National Committee Members. A total of 38 DNC delegates (12 from Florida, 18 from Michigan, and 8 representing Democrats Abroad) have only 0.5 vote each.

The PLEOs listed above currently represent a total of 745 votes. However, that tally is subject to change as events affect individual delegates. For example, the count has decreased due to the death of Rep. Tom Lantos; the loss of one half of Ken Curtis' vote because of his current residency in Florida; the resignation of Eliot Spitzer as Governor of New York (his replacement, David Paterson, was already a superdelegate as a DNC member); and the resignation of Representative Albert Wynn. The count has increased because of the special-election victories of Reps. Bill Foster (IL-14), André Carson (IN-7), Jackie Speier (CA-12), Don Cazayoux (LA-6), Travis Childers (MS-1), and Donna Edwards (MD-4). A more complete history of superdelegate composition changes is provided in a later section.

Finally, note that the tallies here reflect eligibility only; the final, official vote tally will be determined solely by the number of eligible delegates who actually participate in the national convention.

Unpledged PLEO delegates should not be confused with pledged PLEOs. Under Rule 9.C, the pledged PLEO slots are allocated to candidates based on the results of the primaries and caucuses.

=== Unpledged add-ons ===
Under Rule 9.B, each state party selects one or more "unpledged add-on delegates," intended for other elected officials and party leaders not included in the above groups. There are 76 such slots, which are filled according to Democratic Party rules; in practice, it is usually the chairperson of the state Democratic Party who appoints the add-ons, effectively allowing the state chairs to multiply their vote. The formal selection of add-ons is performed at the state party's convention or at a state executive committee meeting. All 76 add-ons are scheduled to be identified by June 21, 2008.

== Totals ==
The following are the totals according to this list. Other organizations have reported different numbers based on pledged or expected support.

Endorsed candidate	With Michigan and Florida delegations at full strength
Barack Obama	562.5
Hillary Clinton	211.5
Uncommitted	73
Unassigned	5
Totals	852

Notes:

- Democrats Abroad superdelegates count for ½ vote. Barack Obama is endorsed by five Democrats Abroad superdelegates giving 2.5 votes, Hillary Clinton is endorsed by three giving 1.5 votes.
- "Unassigned" includes vacant PLEO delegates as well as Add-on delegates that have not yet been assigned.

=== Totals by group ===
Endorsed candidate	Unpledged PLEO ¹					Add-ons	Totals
Endorsed candidate	Distinguished Party Leaders ²	Governors	Senators	Representatives	DNC members	Add-ons	Totals
Barack Obama	11	26.5	45	184.5	233	43.5	543.5
Hillary Clinton	6.5	5	4	29	145	20	209.5
Uncommitted	2	0	.5	18	31	15	66.5
Unassigned	0	0	0	0	5	0	5
Totals	19.5	31.5	49.5	231.5	414	78.5	824.5

¹ For purposes of this list members of Congress and governors are counted in that category even if they are also members of the DNC or are a Distinguished Party Leader (DPL). The DNC, however, considers such delegates to be DNC members or DPL's first. The following members of Congress and governors are either DNC members or are DPL's: Reps. Joe Baca, Mike Honda, Eddie Bernice Johnson, Carolyn Cheeks Kilpatrick, Gregory Meeks, Nancy Pelosi, and Maxine Waters. Sens. Robert Byrd (DPL), Chris Dodd (DPL), Harry Reid, and Debbie Stabenow. Govs. Tim Kaine, Joe Manchin, Ruth Ann Minner, David Paterson, and Ed Rendell (DPL). Florida and Michigan delegations not yet updated to reflect full votes.

² Includes former presidents, former vice presidents, former house and senate leaders, and former party chairs.

=== Totals by state ===
State or territory	Hillary Clinton	Barack Obama	Uncommitted	Unassigned	Total	Leader
Alabama	3	2	3	0	8	Clinton
Alaska	1	4	0	0	5	Obama
American Samoa	4	2	0	0	6	Clinton
Arizona	4	7	0	0	11	Obama
Arkansas	3	7	1	1	12	Obama
California	24	40	7	0	71	Obama
Colorado	3	12	0	0	15	Obama
Connecticut	2	10	0	0	12	Obama
Delaware	2	6	0	0	8	Obama
Democrats Abroad*	1.5	2.5	0	0	4	Obama
District of Columbia	8	14	2	0	24	Obama
Florida*	2	7	4	0	13	Obama
Georgia	3	11	1	0	15	Obama
Guam	2	3	0	0	5	Obama
Hawaii	2	7	0	0	9	Obama
Idaho	0	4	1	0	5	Obama
Illinois	0	30	0	1	31	Obama
Indiana	5	8	0	0	13	Obama
Iowa	3	8	1	0	12	Obama
Kansas	1	8	0	0	9	Obama
Kentucky	3	4	2	0	9	Obama
Louisiana	2	6	3	0	11	Obama
Maine	0	8	0	0	8	Obama
Maryland	8	19	2	0	29	Obama
Massachusetts	10	15	3	0	28	Obama
Michigan*	0	13	1.5	0	14.5	Obama
Minnesota	1	14	1	0	16	Obama
Mississippi	0	5	3	0	8	Obama
Missouri	5	10	1	0	16	Obama
Montana	0	9	0	0	9	Obama
Nebraska	0	6	1	0	7	Obama
Nevada	1	7	1	0	9	Obama
New Hampshire	3	5	0	0	8	Obama
New Jersey	8	11	1	0	20	Obama
New Mexico	6	6	0	0	12	
New York	20	28	1	0	49	Obama
North Carolina	3	15	1	0	19	Obama
North Dakota	0	8	0	0	8	Obama
Ohio	4	14	2	1	21	Obama
Oklahoma	1	7	2	0	10	Obama
Oregon	0	13	0	0	13	Obama
Pennsylvania	16	12	1	0	29	Clinton
Puerto Rico	4	2	2	0	8	Clinton
Rhode Island	6	5	1	0	12	Clinton
South Carolina	2	6	1	0	9	Obama
South Dakota	2	5	1	0	8	Obama
Tennessee	6	8	3	0	17	Obama
Texas	10	21	4	0	35	Obama
Utah	0	6	0	0	6	Obama
Vermont	0	6	2	0	8	Obama
Virgin Islands	2	3	1	0	6	Obama
Virginia	6	11	1	0	18	Obama
Washington	1	16	2	0	19	Obama
West Virginia	3	6	2	0	11	Obama
Wisconsin	2	16	0	0	18	Obama
Wyoming	1	5	0	0	6	Obama

* Democrats Abroad have ½ vote. [Florida, and Michigan superdelegates not yet updated for full votes.]

== Details ==
The following table includes all superdelegate positions. Vacant positions are last, the others are sorted alphabetically by name. To re-sort these tables, click on the double-arrow symbol at the top of a column.

=== List of seated superdelegates ===
The table below consists of 856 entries comprising 852 votes, as follows.

- Unpledged PLEOs: 775 delegates, accounting for 771 votes:
  - 767 delegates from states and territories, each with 1 vote (note: includes 4 vacancies, listed at the end).
  - 8 Democrats Abroad delegates, each with ½ vote. Total: 4 votes.
- Unpledged Add-ons: 81 delegates, with 1 vote each. Total: 81 votes.

Total votes on this table:

- Obama: 562.5
- Clinton: 211.5
- Uncommitted: 73
- Vacant: 5

Total: 852

Delegate	State	Position	Detail or notes	Endorsement	Sources	Commit date^{Ж}
Tina Abbott	MI*	DNC	Michigan Democratic Vice Chair; Michigan AFL-CIO Secretary-Treasurer	Obama	AP	03 Jun 2008
Neil Abercrombie	HI	Representative		Obama	Politico.com	10 Feb 2007
Lynne Abraham	PA	Add-on	District Attorney of Philadelphia	Clinton	DCW	07 Jun 2008
Aníbal Acevedo Vilá	PR	Governor		Obama	CNN	13 Feb 2008
Steven Achelpohl	NE	DNC	State Chair	Obama	Lincoln Journal-Star	19 Apr 2008
Gary Ackerman	NY	Representative	Originally supported Clinton	Obama	ABC News	05 Jun 2008
Daniel Akaka	HI	Senator		Obama	BarackObama.com	12 May 2008
Steven Alari	CA	DNC		Obama	New York Times	11 Jan 2008
Yvette Alexander	DC	Add-on	District Councilmember	Obama	Washington Post	03 Apr 2008
Tom Allen	ME	Representative		Obama	Portland Press Herald	12 May 2008
Jason Altmire	PA	Representative		Obama	DCW	06 Jun 2008
Mark Anderson	SD	Add-on	South Dakota AFL-CIO President	Uncommitted		
Joe Andrew	IN	DPL	Former DNC Chairman; Originally supported Clinton	Obama	AP	1 May 2008
Rob Andrews	NJ	Representative	Originally supported Clinton	Obama	AtlanticCity.com	07 Jun 2008
Patsy Arceneaux	LA	DNC	Originally supported Clinton	Obama	DCW	03 Jun 2008
Mike Arcuri	NY	Representative	Originally supported Clinton	Obama	ABC News	05 Jun 2008
Ward Armstrong	VA	Add-on	State Delegate	Obama	Virginia Politics	31 Jan 2008
Carmen E. Arroyo	NY	Add-on	State Assemblymember	Clinton	MSNBC	1 May 2008
Celita Arroyo de Roques	PR	DNC		Obama	el Nuevo Dia	
Kitti Asberry	OK	DNC	State Vice Chair	Obama	Tulsa World	
Jon Ausman	FL*	DNC		Clinton	Palm Beach Post	03 Jun 2008
Anthony Avallone	CT	DNC		Obama	Hartford Courant	
Joe Baca	CA	Representative	Officially DNC Member; Originally supported Clinton	Obama	Black Voice News	19 Jun 2008
Brian Baird	WA	Representative		Obama	Post-Intelligencer	15 Feb 2008
John Baldacci	ME	Governor	Originally supported Clinton	Obama	MaineToday.com	07 Jun 2008
Tammy Baldwin	WI	Representative	Originally supported Clinton	Obama	The Progressive	20 Jun 2008
John Barrow	GA	Representative		Obama	Macon Telegraph	28 Feb 2008
Willie Barrow	IL	DNC		Obama	Chicago Tribune, BarackObama.com	
Matthew Barzun	KY	Add-on		Obama	DCW	07 Jun 2008
William Craig Bashein	OH	Add-on		Clinton	DCW	21 May 2008
Lu Battaglieri	MI*	DNC	Executive Director, Michigan Education Association	Obama	Detroit Free Press	02 Jun 2008
Max Baucus	MT	Senator		Obama	DCW	03 Jun 2008
Rena Baumgartner	PA	DNC		Clinton	The Morning Call	
Evan Bayh	IN	Senator		Clinton	HillaryClinton.com	24 Sep 2007
Melissa Bean	IL	Representative		Obama	Politico.com	
Joyce Beatty	OH	DNC	Dem. Legislative Campaign Comm.	Obama	Columbus Dispatch	03 Jun 2008
Don Beavers	AR	DNC		Clinton	HillaryClinton.com	
Xavier Becerra	CA	Representative		Obama	American Chronicle	27 Jan 2008
Mike Beebe	AR	Governor	Originally supported Clinton	Obama	ArkansasBusiness.com	09 Jun 2008
Robert Bell	DA*	DNC		Clinton	Toronto Star	16 Feb 2008
Teresa Benitez-Thompson	NV	DNC	State Vice Chair	Obama	Time	06 Mar 2008
Cecil Benjamin	VI	DNC	Territory Chair	Obama	The Virgin Islands Daily News	
Shelley Berkley	NV	Representative	Originally supported Clinton	Obama	Las Vegas Sun	20 Jun 2008
Howard Berman	CA	Representative		Obama	The Boston Globe	15 May 2008
Jeremy Bernard	CA	DNC		Obama	Mercury News	
Marion Berry	AR	Representative	Originally supported Clinton	Obama	ArkansasBusiness.com	09 Jun 2008
Steve Beshear	KY	Governor		Obama	DCW	06 Jun 2008
Judy Bevans	VT	DNC	State Vice Chair	Obama	Brattleboro Reformer	
Belinda Biafore	WV	DNC	State Vice Chair	Clinton	Charleston Gazette	23 Feb 2008
Gus Bickford	MA	DNC		Clinton	Boston.com	12 Feb 2008
Joe Biden	DE	Senator	Former Candidate	Obama	Meet The Press	22 Jun 2008
Jack Billion	SD	DNC	State Chair	Obama	Rapid City Journal	
Rachel Binah	CA	DNC	Originally supported Clinton	Obama	DCW	03 Jun 2008
Jeff Bingaman	NM	Senator		Obama	Albuquerque Journal	28 Apr 2008
Sanford Bishop	GA	Representative		Obama	AP	10 Sep 2007
Tim Bishop	NY	Representative	Originally supported Clinton	Obama	ABC News	05 Jun 2008
Don Bivens	AZ	DNC	State Chair	Obama	DCW	03 Jun 2008
Margaret Blackshere	IL	DNC		Obama	BarackObama.com	
Rod Blagojevich	IL	Governor		Obama	nbc5.com	10 Feb 2007
Earl Blumenauer	OR	Representative		Obama	Oregon Live	1 Feb 2008
Anita Bonds	DC	DNC	District Chair	Obama	Real Clear Politics	12 May 2008
Madeleine Bordallo	GU	Representative	Congressional Delegate	Obama	Time	20 May 2008
Connie Borde	DA*	DNC		Obama		
Dan Boren	OK	Representative		Uncommitted		
Moretta Bosley	KY	DNC		Clinton	Messenger-Inquirer	
Leonard Boswell	IA	Representative		Clinton	HillaryClinton.com	18 Dec 2007
Rick Boucher	VA	Representative		Obama	Tri-Cities Personal News and Media Center	21 Jan 2008
Barbara Boxer	CA	Senator		Obama	DCW	04 Jun 2008
Allen Boyd	FL*	Representative		Uncommitted		
Nancy Boyda	KS	Representative		Obama	Lawrence Journal	11 Jun 2008
Bill Bradbury	OR	DNC	Dem. Assoc. of Secretaries of State	Obama	DCW	03 Jun 2008
Karla Bradley	AR	DNC	State Vice Chair	Clinton	HillaryClinton.com	
Bob Brady	PA	Representative		Obama	Boston.com	03 Jun 2008
Terrie Brady	FL*	DNC	President, Duval Teachers United	Uncommitted		
Bruce Braley	IA	Representative		Obama	AP	30 Apr 2008
Gail Bray	ID	DNC	National Committeewoman	Obama	Idaho Statesman	04 Feb 2008
Joyce Brayboy	NC	DNC		Obama	The News & Observer.	10 Mar 2008
Donna Brazile	DC	DNC		Uncommitted		
Phil Bredesen	TN	Governor		Obama	Politico.com	03 Jun 2008
Scott Brennan	IA	DNC	State Chair	Obama	Quad City Times	20 May 2008
Mark Brewer	MI*	DNC	DNC Vice Chair & State Chair	Uncommitted		
Doug Brooks	MO	DNC		Clinton	HillaryClinton.com	
Roy LaVerne Brooks	TX	DNC	State Vice Chair	Obama	Dallas Morning News	
Corrine Brown	FL*	Representative	Originally supported Clinton	Obama	BarackObama.com	05 Jun 2008
Marilyn Tyler Brown	DC	DNC		Clinton	HillaryClinton.com	10 Feb 2008
Michael Donald Brown	DC	Senator	Shadow Senator	Obama	Washington City Paper	26 Feb 2008
Sherrod Brown	OH	Senator		Obama	BarackObama.com	05 Jun 2008
Janice C. Brunson	AZ	DNC		Clinton	AZ Central	
Mark Bryant	MO	DNC		Obama	AP	
Raymond Buckley	NH	DNC	State Chair	Obama	PolitickerNH.com	03 Jun 2008
Jeanne Buell	ID	DNC	State Vice Chair	Obama	USA Today	11 Feb 2008
Elizabeth Bunn	MI*	DNC	UAW Secretary-Treasurer	Obama	USA Today	10 Jun 2008
William Burga	OH	DNC		Clinton	MSNBC	10 Apr 2008
Anna Burger	DC	DNC		Obama	SEIU	15 Feb 2008
Susan Burgess	NC	DNC	Nat'l Dem. Municipal Officials Conf.	Clinton	WRAL-TV	07 Feb 2008
Tonio Burgos	NJ	DNC		Clinton	AP	02 Apr 2007
Grant Burgoyne	ID	DNC	National Committeeman	Obama	Idaho Statesman	04 Feb 2008
Carol Burke	VI	DNC		Obama	BarackObama.com, AP	10 May 2008
Elsie Burkhalter	LA	DNC	State Second Vice Chair	Uncommitted		
Stewart Burkhalter	AL	Add-on	State AFL-CIO President	Obama	AP	1 Mar 2008
Cordelia Lewis Burks	IN	DNC	State Vice Chair	Obama	WLFI-TV	
James Burns	HI	Add-on	Retired Judge	Obama	Honolulu Advertiser	25 May 2008
G. K. Butterfield	NC	Representative		Obama	The News & Observer	14 Jan 2008
Robert Byrd	WV	Senator	Former Senate Majority Leader – officially DPL^{?}	Obama	Charleston Gazette	19 May 2008
Brendan Byrne	NJ	Add-on	Former Governor	Clinton	BlueJersey.com	17 Apr 2008
Luisette Cabanas	PR	DNC	Territory Vice Chair	Clinton	Atlantic Monthly	30 Apr 2008
Ellen Camhi	CT	DNC		Clinton	Hartford Courant	
Carol Campbell	PA	DNC		Obama	Time	19 Feb 2008
Margarett Campbell	MT	DNC	State Vice Chair.	Obama	DCW	03 Jun 2008
Mary Eva Candon	DC	DNC		Clinton	HillaryClinton.com	
Maria Cantwell	WA	Senator		Obama	The Columbian	09 Jun 2008
Lois Capps	CA	Representative		Obama	Politico.com	30 Apr 2008
Mike Capuano	MA	Representative		Obama	The Boston Globe	28 Jan 2008
Yolanda Caraway	DC	DNC	Originally supported Clinton	Obama	BarackObama.com	06 Jun 2008
Ben Cardin	MD	Senator		Obama	DCW	04 Jun 2008
Dennis Cardoza	CA	Representative	Originally supported Clinton	Obama	BarackObama.com	23 May 2008
Ian Carleton	VT	DNC	State Chair	Obama	Burlington Free Press	06 Mar 2008
Robin Carnahan	MO	DNC	Dem. Assoc. of Secretaries of State	Obama	DCW	03 Jun 2008
Russ Carnahan	MO	Representative		Obama	STLToday	10 May 2007
Chris Carney	PA	Representative		Clinton	AP	9 May 2008
Tom Carper	DE	Senator		Obama	The Hill	04 Jun 2008
André Carson	IN	Representative		Obama	AP	16 Apr 2008
Jimmy Carter	GA	DPL	Former President, Member of the "Pelosi Club"† since May 1, 2008	Obama	WGCL Atlanta	03 Jun 2008
Rob Carver	DE	Add-on		Obama	The News Journal	05 Apr 2008
Bob Casey Jr.	PA	Senator		Obama	The Philadelphia Inquirer	28 Mar 2008
Nick Casey	WV	DNC	State Chair	Obama	DCW	06 Jun 2008
Donna Cassutt	MN	DNC	State Vice Chair	Obama	MN Publius	29 Feb 2008
Kathy Castor	FL*	Representative		Obama	St. Petersburg Times	02 Feb 2008
Don Cazayoux	LA	Representative		Uncommitted		
Mitchell Caesar	FL*	DNC		Obama	DCW	03 Jun 2008
Ben Chandler	KY	Representative		Obama	AP	29 Apr 2008
Cheryl Chapman	SD	DNC	State Vice Chair	Clinton	Keloland.com	04 Jun 2008
Maria Chappelle-Nadal	MO	DNC	State Representative	Obama	STLToday	03 Jun 2008
Martin Chávez	NM	DNC		Clinton	New York Times	
Linda Chavez-Thompson	TX	DNC	DNC Vice Chair	Uncommitted		
Will Cheek	TN	DNC		Obama	Nashville Post	
John D. Cherry	MI*	DNC	Nat'l Assoc. of Dem. Lieutenant Governors; Originally supported Clinton	Obama	MLive.com	08 Jun 2008
Travis Childers	MS	Representative		Uncommitted		
Donna Christian-Christensen	VI	Representative	Congressional Delegate	Clinton	HillaryClinton.com	16 Sep 2007
David Cicilline	RI	DNC	Nat'l Conf. Dem. Mayors	Clinton	New York Times	14 Jun 2007
Alvaro Cifuentes	MD	DNC		Clinton	HillaryClinton.com	
Martha Fuller Clark	NH	DNC	State Vice Chair	Obama	BarackObama.com	
Yvette Clarke	NY	Representative	Originally supported Clinton	Obama	MSNBC	05 Jun 2008
Lacy Clay	MO	Representative		Obama	STLToday	10 May 2007
Emanuel Cleaver	MO	Representative		Clinton	HillaryClinton.com	21 Aug 2007
Verna Cleveland	GA	Add-on		Clinton	DCW	24 May 2008
Bill Clinton	NY	DPL	Former President; Originally supported Clinton	Obama	The Associated Press	26 Jun 2008
Hillary Clinton	NY	Senator	Former Candidate	Obama	CNN	07 Jun 2008
Jim Clyburn	SC	Representative	Majority Whip	Obama	AP	02 Jun 2008
Martha Coakley	MA	Add-on	State Attorney General	Clinton	Time	20 May 2008
Gilda Cobb-Hunter	SC	DNC		Uncommitted		
Larry Cohen	DC	DNC		Obama	YouTube	15 May 2008
Steve Cohen	TN	Representative		Obama	Memphis Flyer	04 Feb 2008
Eric Coleman	MI*	DNC	Oakland County Commissioner	Obama	Detroit Free Press	14 May 2008
Victor Collymore	WA	Add-on		Uncommitted		
Brian Colón	NM	DNC	State Chair	Obama	BarackObama.com	3 May 2008
Toby Condliffe	DA*	DNC	Dems Abroad Vice Chair	Obama	Toronto Star	
Kent Conrad	ND	Senator		Obama	BarackObama.com	29 Dec 2007
John Conyers	MI*	Representative		Obama	Michigan Chronicle	02 Jan 2008
Vivian E. Cook	NY	DNC		Clinton	HillaryClinton.com	
Jim Cooper	TN	Representative		Obama	The Hill	
Maria Cordone	MD	DNC	Nat'l Dem. Seniors Coor.	Clinton	HillaryClinton.com	
Jon Corzine	NJ	Governor	Originally supported Clinton	Obama	NJ.com	05 Jun 2008
Jim Costa	CA	Representative		Obama	BarackObama.com	23 May 2008
Jerry Costello	IL	Representative		Obama	The Hill	
Ed Cote	WA	DNC		Obama		04 Jun 2008
Jeanette Council	NC	DNC		Obama	The Fayetteville Observer	6 May 2008
Joe Courtney	CT	Representative		Obama	TheDay.com	21 May 2008
Bud Cramer	AL	Representative		Uncommitted		
Phoebe Crane	IN	DNC		Clinton	HillaryClinton.com	29 Oct 2007
Richard Cranwell	VA	DNC	State Chair	Obama	BarackObama.com	05 Jun 2008
Joe Crowley	NY	Representative	Originally supported Clinton	Obama	ABC News	05 Jun 2008
Dr. Inez Crutchfield	TN	DNC		Obama	DCW	04 Jun 2008
Joseph Cryan	NJ	DNC	State Chair	Clinton	HillaryClinton.com	02 Apr 2007
Michael Cryor	MD	DNC	State Chair	Obama	Politico.com	5 May 2008
Henry Cuellar	TX	Representative	Originally supported Clinton	Obama	Dallas Morning News	18 Jun 2008
Peter Cuffaro	WV	Add-on		Uncommitted		
Chet Culver	IA	Governor		Obama	Des Moines Register	08 Feb 2008
Mariclare Culver	IA	Add-on	First Lady of Iowa	Uncommitted		
Kristi Cumming	UT	Add-on		Obama	AP	10 May 2008
Elijah Cummings	MD	Representative		Obama	Politico.com	21 Jan 2008
Andrew Cuomo	NY	Add-on	State Attorney General	Clinton	MSNBC	1 May 2008
Barbara Flynn Currie	IL	Add-on	State Representative	Obama	AP	5 May 2008
Kenneth M. Curtis	FL*	DPL	Former DNC Chairman	Clinton	HillaryClinton.com	03 Oct 2007
Joyce Cusack	FL*	DNC		Obama	The Miami Herald	
Carole Dabbs	GA	DNC		Clinton	AP	
Jean Lemire Dahlman	MT	DNC		Obama	AP, The Raw Story	8 May 2008
Richard M. Daley	IL	Add-on	Mayor of Chicago	Obama	AP	5 May 2008
John Daniello	DE	DNC	State Chair	Obama	DCW	03 Jun 2008
Tom Daschle	SD	DPL	Former Senate Majority Leader	Obama	DCW	22 May 2008
John Davies	AK	DNC		Obama	Anchorage Daily News	
Artur Davis	AL	Representative		Obama	New America Media	
Danny Davis	IL	Representative		Obama	New America Media	
Lincoln Davis	TN	Representative		Uncommitted		
Susan Davis	CA	Representative		Obama	DCW	04 Jun 2008
Yvonne Davis	TX	DNC		Obama	Time	29 Feb 2008
Ralph Dawson	NY	DNC		Obama	Politico.com	03 Jun 2008
Howard Dean	VT	DNC	DNC Chairman	Uncommitted		
Lois DeBerry	TN	DNC		Obama	New York Times	
Jennifer DeChant	ME	DNC		Obama	SeaCoastOnline	03 Jun 2008
Joseph DeCotiis	NJ	DNC		Clinton	AP	
Peter DeFazio	OR	Representative		Obama	The Oregonian	8 May 2008
Diana DeGette	CO	Representative	Originally supported Clinton	Obama	BarackObama.com	05 Jun 2008
Bill Delahunt	MA	Representative		Obama	The Boston Globe	27 Dec 2007
Rosa DeLauro	CT	Representative		Obama	Hartford Courant	02 Feb 2008
Debra DeLee	MA	DPL	Former DNC Chairman	Clinton	Boston.com	13 Feb 2008
Diane Denish	NM	DNC	Nat'l Assoc. of Dem. Lieutenant Governors	Clinton	New York Times	
Grace Diaz	RI	DNC		Clinton	Providence Journal	19 Feb 2008
Norm Dicks	WA	Representative	Originally supported Clinton	Obama	BarackObama.com	05 Jun 2008
Gaeten DiGangi	NH	DNC		Clinton	HillaryClinton.com	
Tom DiNapoli	NY	Add-on	State Comptroller	Clinton	MSNBC	1 May 2008
Nancy DiNardo	CT	DNC	State Chair	Obama	WABC-TV	02 Jun 2008
Debbie Dingell	MI*	DNC		Obama	Atlantic	03 Jun 2008
John Dingell	MI*	Representative	Originally supported Clinton	Obama	MLive.com	08 Jun 2008
Arrington Dixon	DC	DNC		Obama	Washington Post, BarackObama.com	
Frank Dixon	OR	DNC	State Vice Chair	Obama	Democratic Party of Oregon	03 Jun 2008
Martha Dixon	AR	DNC		Clinton	HillaryClinton.com	
Chris Dodd	CT	Senator	Former DNC Chairman – officially DPL^{?} Former Candidate	Obama	New York Times	26 Feb 2008
Carolyn Doggett	CA	Add-on		Clinton	Mercury News	18 May 2008
Lloyd Doggett	TX	Representative		Obama	MSNBC	20 Feb 2008
Francisco Domenech	PR	DNC	Young Dems of America	Clinton	HillaryClinton.com	05 Jan 2008
Ronald Donatucci	PA	DNC		Clinton	New York Times	
Joe Donnelly	IN	Representative		Obama	Time	13 May 2008
Byron Dorgan	ND	Senator		Obama	AP	27 Feb 2008
Wayne Dowdy	MS	DNC	State Chair	Obama	AP	21 May 2008
Jim Doyle	WI	Governor		Obama	Journal Sentinel	05 Jan 2008
Mike Doyle	PA	Representative		Obama	DCW	04 Jun 2008
Nancy Drummond	WY	DNC	State Vice Chair	Obama	BarackObama.com	27 May 2008
Martin Dunleavy	CT	DNC	Nat'l Dem. Ethnic Coord. Comm.	Obama	Hartford Courant	
Dick Durbin	IL	Senator		Obama	Politico.com	30 Aug 2007
Mary Ellen Early	CA	DNC		Obama	Los Angeles Daily News	
Mike Easley	NC	Governor		Clinton	AP	28 Apr 2008
Barbara Easterling	VA	DNC		Clinton	HillaryClinton.com	
Maria Echaveste	CA	DNC		Clinton	HillaryClinton.com	27 Apr 2007
Al Edwards	TX	DNC		Obama	Houston Chronicle	06 Mar 2008
Chet Edwards	TX	Representative		Obama	Killeen Daily Herald	19 Feb 2008
Donna Edwards	MD	Representative		Obama	Washington Post	07 Feb 2008
Keith Ellison	MN	Representative		Obama	USA Today	
Brad Ellsworth^{↓}	IN	Representative	Commitment, not endorsement, see footnote^{↓}.	Clinton	ABC News	7 May 2008
Rahm Emanuel	IL	Representative		Obama	DCW	04 Jun 2008
Eliot Engel	NY	Representative	Originally supported Clinton	Obama	ABC News	05 Jun 2008
Anna Eshoo	CA	Representative		Obama	Palo Alto Online	30 Jan 2008
Edward Espinoza	CA	DNC		Obama	Time	9 May 2008
Bob Etheridge	NC	Representative		Obama	DCW	06 Jun 2008
Kathleen Fahey	NE	DNC		Obama	Lincoln Journal Star	
Eni Faleomavaega	AS	Representative	Congressional Delegate	Obama	The Hill	
Sam Farr	CA	Representative		Obama	Politico.com	03 Jun 2008
Herman D. Farrell Jr.	NY	DNC		Clinton	New York Times	14 Feb 2008
Jimmie Farris	TN	DNC		Clinton	Knoxnews.com	
Chaka Fattah	PA	Representative		Obama	New America Media	
Russ Feingold	WI	Senator		Obama	The Capital Times	22 Feb 2008
Dianne Feinstein	CA	Senator		Clinton	HillaryClinton.com	27 Dec 2007
Adrian Fenty	DC	Governor	Mayor	Obama	Washington Post	17 Jul 2007
Joel Ferguson	MI*	DNC	Michigan State University Trustee; Originally supported Clinton	Obama	MLive.com	08 Jun 2008
Charlene Fernandez	AZ	DNC	State Vice Chair	Obama	PolitickerAZ.com	26 Apr 2008
Robert Ficano	MI*	DNC	Executive of Wayne County	Obama	Detroit Free Press	14 May 2008
C. Virginia Fields	NY	Add-on	Former Borough President of Manhattan	Clinton	MSNBC	1 May 2008
Bob Filner	CA	Representative		Obama	DCW	03 Jun 2008
June Fischer	NJ	DNC		Clinton	AP	02 Apr 2007
Michael Fitzgerald	IA	DNC	Nat'l Assoc. of Dem. State Treasurers	Obama	Des Moines Register	
Norma Fisher Flores	TX	DNC		Clinton	Dallas Morning News	07 Mar 2008
James Florio	NJ	Add-on	Former Governor	Clinton	BlueJersey.com	17 Apr 2008
Tina Flournoy	DC	DNC		Clinton	HillaryClinton.com	
Tom Foley	WA	DPL	Former Speaker of the House; Originally supported Clinton	Obama	BarackObama.com	05 Jun 2008
Carnelia Pettis Fondren	MS	DNC	State Vice Chair	Obama	AP	03 Jun 2008
Stephen Fontana	CT	DNC	State Vice Chair	Obama	Hartford Courant	
Bill Foster	IL	Representative		Obama	Chicago Sun-Times	08 Mar 2008
Carol Fowler	SC	DNC	State Chair	Obama	AP	04 Mar 2008
Donald Fowler	SC	DNC		Clinton	HillaryClinton.com	19 Dec 2007
Ken Foxworth	MN	DNC		Obama	Star Tribune	
Barney Frank	MA	Representative		Clinton	HillaryClinton.com	13 Nov 2007
Jim Frasier	OK	DNC		Uncommitted		
Kalyn Free	OK	DNC		Obama	BarackObama.com	5 May 2008
Anita Freedman	NH	DNC		Clinton	HillaryClinton.com	
Dave Freudenthal	WY	Governor		Obama	AP	02 Apr 2008
Dario Frommer	CA	Add-on		Clinton	Mercury News	18 May 2008
Deanna Fuimaono	AS	DNC		Clinton	Honolulu Advertiser	11 Jan 2008
John Gage	MD	DNC		Obama	AP.	9 May 2008
Alex Gallardo-Rooker	CA	DNC	State Vice Chair	Obama	New York Times	
Eric Garcetti	CA	DNC	Nat'l Dem. Municipal Officials Conf.	Obama	Wilshire & Washington	
Larry Gates	KS	DNC	State Chair	Obama	DCW	19 May 2008
Yvonne Gates	NV	DNC		Obama	AP	1 Jun 2008
Dan Gelber	FL*	Add-on		Obama	Miami Herald	7 May 2008
Steven Geller	FL*	Add-on		Uncommitted		
William George	PA	DNC		Clinton	Patriot-News	30 Apr 2008
Dick Gephardt	MO	DPL	Former House Minority Leader	Clinton	HillaryClinton.com	05 Jul 2007
Alice Germond	WV	DNC	Secretary of DNC	Uncommitted		
Liv Gibbons	DA*	DNC		Obama	independent.ie	
Gabby Giffords	AZ	Representative		Obama	DCW	03 Jun 2008
Kirsten Gillibrand	NY	Representative	Originally supported Clinton	Obama	ABC News	05 Jun 2008
Emily Giske	NY	DNC		Clinton	HillaryClinton.com	27 Jun 2007
Diane Glasser	FL*	DNC	State Vice Chair	Obama	DCW	03 Jun 2008
Parris Glendening	MD	Add-on	Former Governor	Obama	The Baltimore Sun	3 May 2008
Lauren Glover	MD	DNC	State Vice Chair	Obama	Politico.com	5 May 2008
Terry Goddard	AZ	Add-on	State Attorney General	Obama	DCW	04 Jun 2008
Patrick Goggles	WY	Add-on		Obama	Montana's News Station	24 May 2008
Charlie Gonzalez	TX	Representative		Obama	San Antonio Express-News.	11 Feb 2008
Jaime Gonzalez Jr.	TX	DNC		Clinton	HillaryClinton.com	2 May 2008
Bart Gordon	TN	Representative		Uncommitted		
Al Gore	TN	DPL	Former Vice President	Obama	BarackObama.com	16 Jun 2008
Billi Gosh	VT	DNC	Originally supported Clinton	Obama	DCW	05 Jun 2008
Enid Goubeaux	OH	DNC		Obama	Campaign release	21 Apr 2008
Jennifer Granholm	MI*	Governor	Originally supported Clinton	Obama	MLive.com	08 Jun 2008
Al Green	TX	Representative		Obama	BarackObama.com	
Gene Green	TX	Representative		Clinton	Dallas Morning News	1 Feb 2008
Jenny Greenleaf	OR	DNC		Obama	BlueOregon	23 May 2008
Christine Gregoire	WA	Governor		Obama	Washington Post	08 Feb 2008
Janice Griffin	MD	DNC		Obama	New York Times	
Raúl Grijalva	AZ	Representative		Obama	Arizona Daily Star	29 Jan 2008
Renee Grisham	VA	Add-on		Clinton	Virginia Politics	14 Jun 2008
Marcel Groen	PA	DNC		Clinton	PhilluBurbs.com	
Michael Gronstal	IA	DNC	Dem. Legislative Campaign Comm.	Clinton	RadioIowa	
Steven Grossman	MA	DPL	Former DNC Chairman	Clinton	The Boston Globe	11 Jun 2007
Stan Gruszynski	WI	DNC		Obama	Milwaukee Journal Sentinel	02 Feb 2008
Luis Gutiérrez	IL	Representative		Obama	Politico.com	
Mary Gail Gwaltney	NM	DNC		Clinton	Albuquerque Tribune	
Rebecca Gwatney	AR	DNC	following Bill Gwatney's death	Obama	AP/Arkansas News	20 Aug 2008
Joe Hackney	NC	Add-on		Obama	DCW	21 Jun 2008
Karen Hale	UT	DNC	Originally supported Clinton	Obama	DCW	04 Jun 2008
John Hall	NY	Representative	Originally supported Clinton	Obama	ABC News	05 Jun 2008
Maria Handley	CO	DNC		Clinton	Denver Post	
Dan Hannaher	ND	Add-on		Obama	The Forum, AP	06 Apr 2008
David Hardt	TX	DNC	Young Dems of America	Uncommitted	Dallas Morning News	
Phil Hare	IL	Representative		Obama	Politico.com	
Tom Harkin	IA	Senator		Obama	DCW	04 Jun 2008
Jane Harman	CA	Representative		Clinton	HillaryClinton.com	18 Jul 2007
Fred R. Harris	NM	DPL	Former DNC Chairman	Obama	KVIA ABC 7	23 Jan 2008
Pricey Harrison	NC	Add-on		Obama	DCW	21 Jun 2008
Vicki Harwell	TN	Add-on	State Federation for Democratic Women President	Clinton	Knoxville News Sentinel	13 May 2008
Kamil Hasan	CA	DNC	Originally supported Clinton	Obama	DCW	03 Jun 2008
Alcee Hastings	FL*	Representative	Originally supported Clinton	Obama	BarackObama.com	05 Jun 2008
William Quay Hays	CA	Add-on		Obama	Mercury News	18 May 2008
Brad Henry	OK	Governor		Obama	AP	23 Apr 2008
Inola Henry	CA	DNC		Obama	AP	7 May 2008
Alexis Herman	VA	DNC		Uncommitted		
Brian Higgins	NY	Representative	Originally supported Clinton	Obama	ABC News	05 Jun 2008
Patti Higgins	AK	DNC	State Chair	Clinton	Anchorage Press	
Baron Hill	IN	Representative		Obama	Herald-Times	30 Apr 2008
Maurice Hinchey	NY	Representative	Originally supported Clinton	Obama	ABC News	05 Jun 2008
Rubén Hinojosa	TX	Representative	Originally supported Clinton	Obama	Dallas Morning News	18 Jun 2008
Mazie Hirono	HI	Representative		Obama	Star-Bulletin	9 May 2008
Paul Hodes	NH	Representative		Obama	BarackObama.com	
Jim Hoffa	MI*	Add-on	Teamsters President	Obama	IBT	05 Jun 2008
Joe Hogsett	IN	Add-on	Former Indiana Secretary of State	Obama	WISH-TV	27 Jun 2008
Tim Holden	PA	Representative		Uncommitted		
Wayne Holland	UT	DNC	State Chair	Obama	MSNBC	10 Apr 2008
David Holmes	TX	DNC		Clinton	Austin American-Statesman	
Ivan Holmes	OK	DNC	State Chair	Obama	CNN	03 Jun 2008
Rush Holt Jr.	NJ	Representative		Obama	DCW	03 Jun 2008
Mike Honda	CA	Representative	DNC Vice Chair – officially DNC Member	Uncommitted		
Linda Honold	WI	Add-on	Former State Chair	Clinton	WisPolitics	14 Jun 2008
Jim Hood	MS	Add-on	State Attorney General	Uncommitted		
Darlene Hooley	OR	Representative	Originally supported Clinton	Obama	The Oregonian	06 Jun 2008
Judith Hope	NY	DNC		Clinton	HillaryClinton.com	
Steven Horsford	NV	DNC		Obama	Las Vegas Review-Journal	
Constance Howard	IL	DNC	State Vice Chair	Obama	BarackObama.com	
Waring Howe Jr.	SC	DNC		Obama	Post and Courier	
Steny Hoyer	MD	Representative		Obama	PolitickerMD.com	04 Jun 2008
Alice Huffman	CA	DNC		Clinton	HillaryClinton.com	27 Apr 2007
Aleita Huguenin	CA	DNC		Clinton	Politico.com	
Theresa Hunkin	AS	DNC	Territory Vice Chair	Obama	The Honolulu Advertiser	
Thomas Hynes	IL	DNC		Obama	Politico.com	
Harold Ickes	DC	DNC		Clinton	HillaryClinton.com	
Daniel Inouye	HI	Senator		Clinton	HillaryClinton.com	25 May 2007
Jay Inslee	WA	Representative	Originally supported Clinton	Obama	BarackObama.com	05 Jun 2008
Steve Israel	NY	Representative	Originally supported Clinton	Obama	ABC News	05 Jun 2008
Jesse Jackson Jr.	IL	Representative		Obama	Washington Post	
Wilbur Lee Jeffcoat	SC	DNC	State Vice Chair	Obama	Time	9 May 2008
Ben Jeffers	LA	DNC		Obama	2theadvocate	18 Feb 2008
William Jefferson	LA	Representative		Obama	Nola.com	03 Jun 2008
Ben Johnson	DC	DNC	Originally supported Clinton	Obama	DCW	03 Jun 2008
Blake Johnson	AK	DNC	State Vice Chair	Obama	DCW	19 May 2008
Denise Johnson	TX	DNC	Member of the "Pelosi Club"† since April 6, 2008	Uncommitted	Star Telegram	
Eddie Bernice Johnson	TX	Representative	officially DNC Member	Obama	Dallas South	06 Feb 2008
Hank Johnson	GA	Representative		Obama	AP	30 Jul 2007
Joe Johnson	VA	DNC		Obama	DCW	9 May 2008
Josie R. Johnson	MN	Add-on		Uncommitted		
Tim Johnson	SD	Senator	Originally supported Obama	Clinton	Keloland.com	04 Jun 2008
Emil Jones	IL	DNC		Obama	BarackObama.com	17 Dec 2007
John de Jongh Jr.	VI	Governor		Obama	governordejongh.com	02 Jan 2008
Raymond A. Jordan	MA	DNC		Obama	The Boston Globe	02 Feb 2008
Pete Jorgensen	WY	DNC		Obama	Montana's News Station	
Steve Kagen	WI	Representative		Obama	Green Bay Press Gazette	21 Feb 2008
Tim Kaine	VA	Governor	Dem. Gov. Assoc. – officially DNC	Obama	Washington Post	10 Feb 2007
Elaine Kamarck	MA	DNC		Clinton	Boston.com	
Paul Kanjorski	PA	Representative		Clinton	HillaryClinton.com	03 Feb 2008
Marcy Kaptur	OH	Representative		Uncommitted		
Allan J. Katz	FL*	DNC	Obama Finance Committee member	Obama	BarackObama.com	10 Feb 2007
Randy Kelley	AL	DNC		Clinton	Montgomery Advertiser	
Patrick Kennedy	RI	Representative		Obama	AP	28 Jan 2008
Ted Kennedy	MA	Senator		Obama	Houston Chronicle	28 Jan 2008
Yvonne Kennedy	AL	DNC		Clinton	Montgomery Advertiser	
John Kerry	MA	Senator		Obama	New York Times	10 Jan 2008
Awais Khaleel	WI	DNC	College Dems of America National VP	Obama	YouTube	13 May 2008
Jane Kidd	GA	DNC	State Chair	Obama	Atlanta Journal-Constitution	05 Mar 2008
Dale Kildee	MI*	Representative	Originally supported Clinton	Obama	MLive.com	08 Jun 2008
Carolyn Cheeks Kilpatrick	MI*	Representative	officially DNC Member	Obama	BarackObama.com	03 Jun 2008
Kwame Kilpatrick	MI*	DNC	Nat'l Conf. Dem. Mayors	Obama	Detroit Free Press	03 Jun 2008
E. Lee Kinch	KS	DNC		Obama	AP	
Ron Kind	WI	Representative		Obama	MSNBC	20 Feb 2008
Wayne Kinney	OR	DNC		Obama	AP	28 May 2008
Paul G. Kirk	MA	DPL	Former DNC Chairman	Obama	Time	2 May 2008
Ron Kirk	TX	Add-on	Former Mayor of Dallas	Obama	DCW	07 Jun 2008
Ron Klein	FL*	Representative		Obama	DCW	03 Jun 2008
Eric Kleinfeld	DC	DNC		Clinton	HillaryClinton.com	
Amy Klobuchar	MN	Senator		Obama	AP	31 Mar 2008
Helen Knetzer	KS	DNC	Nat'l Fed. of Dem. Women	Obama	DCW	03 Jun 2008
Tony Knowles	AK	Add-on	Former Governor	Obama	DCW	24 May 2008
John Knutson	ME	DNC	State Chair	Obama	WMTV ABC 8	
Herb Kohl	WI	Senator		Obama	JS Online	04 Jun 2008
Nancy Kopp	MD	DNC	Nat'l Assoc. of Dem. State Treasurers	Clinton	HillaryClinton.com	
Debra Kozikowski	MA	DNC		Obama	SeaCoastOnline	03 Jun 2008
Teresa Krusor	KS	DNC	State Vice Chair	Clinton	ArkCity	02 Feb 2008
Dennis Kucinich	OH	Representative	Former Candidate	Uncommitted		
Ted Kulongoski	OR	Governor	Originally supported Clinton	Obama	The Oregonian	06 Jun 2008
Walter Kunicki	WI	Add-on	Former Assembly Speaker	Obama	WisPolitics	14 Jun 2008
Reginald LaFayette	NY	DNC		Clinton	Daily News	07 Apr 2008
Joyce Lalonde	MI*	DNC	Macomb County party activist	Obama	Detroit News	03 Jun 2008
Frank LaMere	NE	DNC		Obama	Lincoln Journal Star	08 Feb 2008
Nick Lampson	TX	Representative		Obama	Dallas Morning News	10 Jun 2008
Mary Landrieu	LA	Senator		Obama	The Hill	04 Jun 2008
Helen Langan	UT	DNC	Originally supported Clinton	Obama	DCW	05 Jun 2008
James Langevin	RI	Representative	Originally supported Clinton	Obama	The Providence Journal	09 Jun 2008
Fagafaga Langkilde	AS	DNC		Clinton	HillaryClinton.com	11 Jan 2008
Rick Larsen	WA	Representative		Obama	Post-Intelligencer	8 May 2008
John B. Larson	CT	Representative		Obama	Hartford Courant	
Nancy Larson	MN	DNC		Obama	AP	13 Apr 2008
Frank Lautenberg	NJ	Senator		Obama	DCW	04 Jun 2008
Brenda Lawrence	MI*	DNC	Nat'l Conf. Dem. Mayors	Obama	Free Press	02 Jun 2008
Buddy Leach	LA	DNC	Former Representative; Originally supported Clinton	Obama	DCW	04 Jun 2008
Patrick Leahy	VT	Senator		Obama	Brattleboro Reformer	17 Jan 2008
Jim Leaman	VA	DNC		Obama	DCW	03 Jun 2008
Barbara Lee	CA	Representative		Obama	San Francisco Chronicle	10 Dec 2007
Sheila Jackson Lee	TX	Representative		Clinton	New America Media	14 May 2007
Jerry Lee	TN	Add-on	State AFL-CIO President	Uncommitted	Knoxville News Sentinel	
Stephen Leeds	GA	Add-on	State Party Secretary	Obama	DCW	24 May 2008
Belkis Leong-Hong	MD	DNC		Obama	BarackObama.com	03 Jun 2008
Carl Levin	MI*	Senator		Uncommitted		
Sander Levin	MI*	Representative	Originally supported Clinton	Obama	MLive.com	08 Jun 2008
John Lewis	GA	Representative	Originally supported Clinton	Obama	The Atlanta Journal-Constitution	27 Feb 2008
Sam Lieberman	NV	DNC	State Chair	Obama	DCW	03 Jun 2008
Blanche Lincoln	AR	Senator	Originally supported Clinton	Obama	NewsRoom	05 Jun 2008
Dan Lipinski	IL	Representative		Obama	AP	26 Mar 2008
Dave Loebsack	IA	Representative		Obama	The Quad-City Times	17 Dec 2007
Zoe Lofgren	CA	Representative	Endorsed Obama, but says may vote Clinton if leading in June, to follow district's strong vote for Clinton.	Obama	DCW	22 May 2008
Mary Long	GA	DNC		Obama	Atlanta Journal-Constitution	04 Mar 2008
Richard Long	MI*	Add-on		Obama	AP	10 Jun 2008
Sue Lovell	TX	DNC		Clinton	HillaryClinton.com	
Myron Lowery	TN	DNC	Nat'l Dem. Municipal Officials Conf.	Clinton	Memphis Flyer	
Nita Lowey	NY	Representative	Originally supported Clinton	Obama	ABC News	05 Jun 2008
Mariolga Luis	PR	Add-on		Uncommitted		
Pilar C. Lujan	GU	DNC	Territory Chair	Clinton	HillaryClinton.com	22 May 2008
Kari Luna	HI	DNC	State Vice-chair (elected 25 May)	Obama	Honolulu Advertiser	25 May 2008
Maria Luna	NY	DNC		Clinton	HillaryClinton.com	
John Lynch	NH	Governor		Obama	PolitickerNH.com	27 Jun 2008
Leon Lynch	PA	DNC		Obama	York Daily Record	22 Feb 2008
Patrick Lynch	RI	DNC	Dem. Attorneys Gen. Assoc.	Obama	BarackObama.com	09 Feb 2008
Stephen Lynch	MA	Representative		Clinton	HillaryClinton.com	26 Oct 2007
William J. Lynch	RI	DNC	State Chair	Clinton	New York Times	17 Feb 2008
Richard Machacek	IA	DNC		Obama	Des Moines Register	29 Apr 2008
Eileen Macoll	WA	DNC	State Vice Chair	Clinton	DCW	29 May 2008
Mike Madigan	IL	DNC	State Chair	Obama	St. Louis Post-Dispatch	
Tim Mahoney	FL*	Representative		Uncommitted		
Molly Beth Malcolm	TX	Add-on		Obama	DCW	07 Jun 2008
Mark Mallory	OH	DNC		Obama	Cincinnati Enquirer	
Ronald Malone	OH	DNC		Clinton	Record-Courier	
Carolyn Maloney	NY	Representative	Originally supported Clinton	Obama	ABC News	05 Jun 2008
Charles Manatt	CA	DPL	Former DNC Chairman	Clinton	HillaryClinton.com	07 Dec 2007
Joe Manchin	WV	Governor	Dem. Gov. Assoc. – officially DNC	Obama	DCW	06 Jun 2008
Ed Markey	MA	Representative		Uncommitted		
Deb Markowitz	VT	Add-on	VT Secretary of State	Uncommitted		
Pat Maroney	WV	DNC		Clinton	Charleston Gazette	18 Mar 2008
Christine Marques	DA*	DNC	Dems Abroad Chair	Obama	BarackObama.com	14 May 2008
Debbie Marquez	CO	DNC		Obama	Denver Post	
Jim Marshall	GA	Representative		Uncommitted		
Iris Martinez	IL	DNC		Obama	BarackObama.com	
Ramona Martinez	CO	DNC		Clinton	New York Times	17 Jan 2008
Raúl Martínez	FL*	DNC	Former Mayor of Hialeah, FL	Clinton	HillaryClinton.com	17 Jul 2007
Robert Martinez Jr.	TX	DNC		Clinton	Dallas Morning News	
Sophie Masloff	PA	DNC		Clinton	Post-Gazette	10 Apr 2008
Kenny Mass	NE	Add-on		Uncommitted		
Sharon Mast	WA	DNC		Obama		04 Jun 2008
Catherine Cortez Masto	NV	DNC	Dem. Attorneys Gen. Assoc.	Obama	DCW	03 Jun 2008
Jim Matheson	UT	Representative		Obama	BarackObama.com	05 Jun 2008
Doris Matsui	CA	Representative		Clinton	The Sacramento Bee	16 May 2007
Edna O'Neill Mattson	RI	DNC	State Vice Chair	Clinton	New York Times	
Jim Maxson	ND	DNC		Obama	The Bismarck Tribune	
Rusty McAllister	NV	Add-on	International Association of Firefighters	Uncommitted		
Terry McAuliffe	VA	DPL	Former DNC Chairman	Clinton	HillaryClinton.com	20 Jan 2007
Terry McBrayer	KY	DNC		Clinton	Lexington Herald-Leader	
Carolyn McCarthy	NY	Representative	Originally supported Clinton	Obama	ABC News	05 Jun 2008
Claire McCaskill	MO	Senator		Obama	New York Times	13 Jan 2008
Jennifer McClellan	VA	DNC	State Vice Chair	Obama	AP	7 May 2008
Kenneth McClintock	PR	DNC		Clinton	HillaryClinton.com	05 Jan 2008
Betty McCollum	MN	Representative		Obama	BarackObama.com	12 Dec 2007
Jim McDermott	WA	Representative		Obama	Post-Intelligencer	15 May 2008
David McDonald	WA	DNC		Obama	Tri-City Herald	02 Jun 2008
Dennis McDonald	MT	DNC		Obama	DCW	03 Jun 2008
Betty McElderry	OK	DNC		Clinton	New York Times	
Gerald McEntee	PA	DNC		Clinton	New York Times	
Jim McGovern	MA	Representative		Clinton	HillaryClinton.com	29 Mar 2007
Mike McIntyre	NC	Representative		Obama	DCW	06 Jun 2008
Rhine McLin	OH	DNC	State Vice Chair	Obama	WHIO	05 Mar 2008
Jerry McNerney	CA	Representative		Obama	DCW	03 Jun 2008
Michael McNulty	NY	Representative	Originally supported Clinton	Obama	ABC News	05 Jun 2008
Leila Medley	MO	DNC		Uncommitted		
Kendrick Meek	FL*	Representative	Originally supported Clinton	Obama	BarackObama.com	05 Jun 2008
Jerry Meek	NC	DNC	State Chair	Obama	AP	7 May 2008
Gregory Meeks	NY	Representative	officially DNC Member; Originally supported Clinton	Obama	MSNBC	05 Jun 2008
Dennis Mehiel	NY	DNC		Clinton	Buffalo News	18 Feb 2008
Charlie Melançon	LA	Representative		Uncommitted		
John Melcher	MT	DNC	Nat'l Dem. Seniors Coor.	Obama	AP	02 Apr 2008
Brian Melendez	MN	DNC	State Chair	Obama	MN Publius	29 Feb 2008
Bob Menendez	NJ	Senator	Originally supported Clinton	Obama	NJ.com	17 Jun 2008
Moses Mercado	TX	DNC		Obama	Austin American-Statesman	
Richard Michalski	MD	DNC		Clinton	HillaryClinton.com	
Mike Michaud	ME	Representative		Obama	PolitickerME.com	04 Jun 2008
Glenard Middleton	MD	DNC		Clinton	HillaryClinton.com	
Carole Migden	CA	DNC		Uncommitted		
Barbara Mikulski	MD	Senator	Originally supported Clinton	Obama	WJLA-TV	07 Jun 2008
Jean Milko	PA	DNC	State Vice Chair	Clinton	The Morning Call	
Brad Miller	NC	Representative		Obama	AP	8 May 2008
George Miller	CA	Representative		Obama	Contra Costa Times	
John Millin	WY	DNC	State Chair	Obama	Montana's News Station	
Leo Perez Minaya	DA*	DNC		Clinton	New York Times	
Ruth Ann Minner	DE	Governor	Dem. Gov. Assoc. – officially DNC	Clinton	The News Journal	09 Jan 2008
George J. Mitchell	NY	DPL	Former Senate Majority Leader	Uncommitted		
Harry Mitchell	AZ	Representative		Obama	AP	10 May 2008
Heather Mizeur	MD	DNC		Obama	DCW	03 Jun 2008
Becky Moeller	TX	Add-on	Texas AFL-CIO President, formerly a Clinton state delegate	Obama	American-Statesman	09 Jun 2008
Mona Mohib	DC	DNC		Clinton	New York Times	
Chuck Mohlke	FL*	DNC		Clinton	St. Petersburg Times	09 Feb 2008
Alan Mollohan	WV	Representative		Obama	BarackObama.com	29 May 2008
Walter Mondale	MN	DPL	Former Vice President; Originally supported Clinton	Obama	DCW	04 Jun 2008
Frank Montanaro	RI	DNC		Clinton	The Providence Journal	
Susan Montee	MO	Add-on	State Auditor	Obama	St. Louis Post-Dispatch	05 Apr 2008
Dannie Montgomery	NC	DNC	State Vice Chair	Obama	The News & Observer	
Dennis Moore	KS	Representative		Obama	KOIN News	03 Jun 2008
Gwen Moore	WI	Representative		Obama	Milwaukee Journal Sentinel	
Jennifer Moore	KY	DNC	State Chair	Uncommitted		
Minyon Moore	DC	DNC		Clinton	HillaryClinton.com	
Jim Moran	VA	Representative		Obama	Washington Post	
Theresa Morelli	DA*	DNC		Clinton	HillaryClinton.com	5 May 2008
Mike Morgan	OK	DNC	Dem. Legislative Campaign Comm.	Obama	MSNBC	14 May 2008
Patricia Moss	OH	DNC		Clinton	AP	
Mee Moua	MN	DNC		Obama	Asian American Press	
Bob Mulholland	CA	DNC		Uncommitted		
Chris Murphy	CT	Representative		Obama	Hartford Courant	
Janee Murphy	FL*	DNC		Obama	Palm Beach Post	02 Jun 2008
Patrick Murphy	PA	Representative		Obama	The Hill	21 Aug 2007
Philip D. Murphy	NJ	DNC	National Finance Chair	Uncommitted		
Ian Murray	PA	DNC	Originally supported Clinton	Obama	DCW	03 Jun 2008
Patty Murray	WA	Senator	Originally supported Clinton	Obama	The Columbian	09 Jun 2008
John Murtha	PA	Representative		Clinton	Washington Post	18 Mar 2008
Jerry Nadler	NY	Representative	Originally supported Clinton	Obama	ABC News	05 Jun 2008
Ray Nagin	LA	Add-on	Mayor of New Orleans	Obama	DCW	13 May 2008
Grace Napolitano	CA	Representative	Originally supported Clinton	Obama	CQ Politics	12 Jun 2008
Janet Napolitano	AZ	Governor		Obama	New York Times	11 Jan 2008
Sonny Nardi	OH	DNC		Obama	AOL News	22 Feb 2008
Richard Neal	MA	Representative	Originally supported Clinton	Obama	MassLive.com	08 Jun 2008
Ben Nelson	NE	Senator		Obama	Lincoln Journal Star	12 Jan 2008
Bill Nelson	FL*	Senator	Originally supported Clinton	Obama	WFTS	09 Jun 2008
Nick Nemec	SD	DNC		Obama	Rapid City Journal	
Mary Jo Neville	MD	DNC		Obama	Baltimore Sun	
Jay Nixon	MO	Add-on	State Attorney General	Obama	DCW	03 Jun 2008
Donald Norcross	NJ	DNC		Obama	PolitickerNJ.com	20 Feb 2008
Eleanor Holmes Norton	DC	Representative	Congressional Delegate	Obama	BarackObama.com, AP	11 Feb 2008
Pat Notter	WA	DNC		Obama	The Wenatchee World Online	
Cynthia Nunley	WY	DNC		Clinton	HillaryClinton.com	03 Jun 2008
Barack Obama	IL	Senator	Candidate	Himself		10 Feb 2007
Jim Oberstar	MN	Representative		Obama	Oregon Live	
Dave Obey	WI	Representative		Obama	Milwaukee Journal Sentinel	
David O'Brien	MA	DNC		Obama	The Boston Globe	
Muriel Offerman	NC	DNC		Obama	DCW	03 Jun 2008
Brent O'Leary	DA*	DNC		Obama	americansinsingapore, New York Times	
John Olsen	CT	DNC		Clinton	Courant.com	1 May 2008
John Olver	MA	Representative		Obama	The Republican	03 Jun 2008
Martin O'Malley	MD	Governor	Originally supported Clinton	Obama	Washington Post	12 Jun 2008
June O'Neil	NY	DNC	State Chair	Clinton	New York Times	
Sandy Opstvedt	IA	DNC		Clinton	HillaryClinton.com	
Solomon Ortiz	TX	Representative	Originally supported Clinton	Obama	Dallas Morning News	18 Jun 2008
Bill Orton	UT	DNC		Obama	Deseret News	
Audra Ostergard	NE	DNC	State Vice Chair	Obama	Nebraska.tv	23 Apr 2008
Bill Owen	TN	DNC		Clinton	HillaryClinton.com	
Jill Padwa	RI	Add-on		Uncommitted		
Frank Pallone	NJ	Representative		Clinton	HillaryClinton.com	02 Apr 2007
Ben Pangelinan	GU	DNC		Obama	Guampdn.com Pacific Daily News	27 May 2008
Dan Parker	IN	DNC	State Chair	Clinton	HillaryClinton.com	29 Oct 2007
[David Parker	NC	DNC		Obama	DCW	03 Jun 2008
Elisa Parker	TN	DNC	State Vice Chair	Clinton	Memphis Flyer	1 Feb 2008
Rudolph Parker	FL*	DNC		Uncommitted		
Mark Parkinson	KS	Add-on	Lt. Governor	Obama	Fort Mill Times	17 May 2008
Jay Parmley	OK	DNC		Obama	DCW	03 Jun 2008
Bill Pascrell	NJ	Representative	Originally supported Clinton	Obama	PolitickerNJ.com	05 Jun 2008
Mona Pasquil	CA	DNC		Clinton	HillaryClinton.com	
Ed Pastor	AZ	Representative		Clinton	Arizona Central	
Bob Pastrick	IN	DNC		Clinton	HillaryClinton.com	29 Oct 2007
David Paterson	NY	Governor	Officially DNC Member, was Lieutenant Governor before Spitzer resignation.	Clinton	CNN	14 May 2007
Deval Patrick	MA	Governor		Obama	devalpatrick.com	22 Oct 2007
John Patrick	TX	DNC		Obama	Dallas Morning News	1 May 2008
Johnnie Patton	MS	DNC		Obama	BarackObama.com	
Jaime Paulino	GU	DNC	Territory Vice Chair	Obama	Marianas Variety	3 May 2008
Lou Paulson	CA	Add-on		Obama	Mercury News	18 May 2008
Donald Payne	NJ	Representative	Originally supported Clinton	Obama	The Star Ledger	9 May 2008
Gregory Pecoraro	MD	DNC		Obama	DCW	17 May 2008
Christine Pelosi	CA	DNC	Nancy's daughter, Charter Member of the "Pelosi Club"† since March 30, 2008	Obama	DCW	03 Jun 2008
Nancy Pelosi	CA	Representative	Speaker of the House, Officially DNC Member, Charter Member of the "Pelosi Club"† since March 30, 2008	Uncommitted		
Dwight Pelz	WA	DNC	State Chair	Obama	PolitickerWA.com	18 May 2008
Federico Peña	CO	Add-on	Former Denver mayor and Clinton administration Cabinet member, national campaign co-chair for Obama	Obama	New York Times	17 May 2008
Carol Pensky	MD	DNC		Clinton	HillaryClinton.com	
John Pérez	CA	DNC		Obama	MSNBC	03 Jun 2008
Ed Perlmutter	CO	Representative		Obama	Denver Post	
Carol Peterson	NC	DNC		Uncommitted		
Collin Peterson	MN	Representative		Obama	Minnesota Independent	10 Jun 2008
Renee Pfenning	ND	DNC		Obama	KXMC Minot ABC	29 Feb 2008
Gwethalyn Phillips	ME	Add-on		Obama	The Boston Globe	1 Jun 2008
Lonnie Plott	GA	DNC		Clinton	Daily Report	
Earl Pomeroy	ND	Representative		Obama	The Dickinson Press	
Karren Pope-Onwukwe	MD	DNC		Obama	BarackObama.com	07 Dec 2007
Richard Port	HI	DNC		Clinton	Honolulu Advertiser	
J. W. Postal	CO	DNC		Obama	Denver Post	07 Feb 2008
Arthur Powell	MA	Add-on		Clinton	AP	10 May 2008
Steve Powell	IL	DNC		Obama	Huffington Post	26 Feb 2008
Vince Powers	NE	DNC		Obama	Lincoln Journal Star	
Roberto Prats	PR	DNC	Territory Chair	Clinton	New York Times	
Renée Gill Pratt	LA	DNC		Clinton	Acadiana Independent Weekly	1 Jan 2008
Marie Prezioso	WV	DNC		Clinton	New York Times	
David Price	NC	Representative		Obama	The Charlotte Observer	16 Apr 2008
Mark Pryor	AR	Senator	Originally supported Clinton	Obama	ArkansasBusiness.com	09 Jun 2008
Sandy Querry	MO	DNC		Clinton	HillaryClinton.com	22 Jun 2007
Jeffrey Radjewski	MI*	DNC	IBEW Local 58 Business Manager	Uncommitted		
Jason Rae	WI	DNC		Obama	CNN	
Nick Rahall	WV	Representative		Obama	Huntington Herald-Dispatch	06 Mar 2008
Robert Ramirez	NY	DNC		Clinton	HillaryClinton.com	30 Jun 2007
Charles Rangel	NY	Representative	Originally supported Clinton	Obama	MSNBC	05 Jun 2008
Robert Rankin	CA	DNC		Obama	BarackObama.com	05 Jun 2008
Gail Rasmussen	OR	DNC		Obama	AP	29 May 2008
Richard Ray	GA	DNC		Obama	BarackObama.com	05 Jun 2008
Dana Redd	NJ	DNC	State Vice Chair	Obama	PolitickerNJ.com, MSNBC	20 Feb 2008
Chris Redfern	OH	DNC	State Chair	Obama	BarackObama.com	05 Jun 2008
John Rednour, Sr.	IL	DNC		Obama	The Southern Illinoisan	
Jack Reed	RI	Senator		Obama	DCW	06 Jun 2008
Joe L. Reed	AL	DNC		Clinton	HillaryClinton.com	
David Regan	OH	Add-on	Labor Leader	Obama	Patriot Ledger, AP	10 May 2008
Harry Reid	NV	Senator	Senate Majority Leader, officially DNC Member	Obama	CNN	06 Jun 2008
Mame Reiley	VA	DNC		Clinton	HillaryClinton.com	7 May 2007
Ed Rendell	PA	Governor	Former DNC Chairman – officially DPL^{?}	Clinton	Philadelphia Inquirer	24 Jan 2008
Silvestre Reyes	TX	Representative	Originally supported Clinton	Obama	Dallas Morning News	18 Jun 2008
Bill Richardson	NM	Governor	Former Candidate	Obama	New York Times	21 Mar 2008
Evelyn Richardson	PA	DNC		Clinton	Pittsburgh Post-Gazette	
Jeffrey Richardson	DC	DNC	District Vice Chair	Obama	Washington Blade	
Laura Richardson	CA	Representative		Clinton	New America Media	13 Sep 2007
Betty Richie	TX	DNC	Charter Member of the "Pelosi Club"† since March 30, 2008. Wife of Boyd Richie (TX DNC).	Obama	Austin American-Statesman	29 May 2008
Boyd Richie	TX	DNC	State Chair, husband of Betty Richie (TX DNC).	Obama	Burnt Orange Report	29 May 2008
Joe Rios	AZ	DNC		Clinton	HillaryClinton.com	12 Sep 2007
Bill Ritter	CO	Governor		Obama	DCW	03 Jun 2008
R. Keith Roark	ID	DNC	State Chair	Obama	BarackObama.com	12 May 2008
Barbara Roberts	OR	Add-on	Former governor	Obama	DCW	21 Jun 2008
Jay Rockefeller	WV	Senator		Obama	The Boston Globe	29 Feb 2008
Ciro Rodriguez	TX	Representative		Clinton	Houston Chronicle	9 May 2008
Kevin Rodriguez	VI	DNC	Originally supported Clinton, then Obama, May 10, now Clinton again, May 27	Clinton	DCW	27 May 2008
Mannie Rodriguez	CO	DNC		Clinton	Denver Post	30 Jun 2007
Virgie Rollins	MI*	DNC	DNC black caucus chair	Obama	Detroit News	
Roy Romer	CO	DPL	Former DNC Chairman and Former CO Governor	Obama	MSNBC	13 May 2008
Carol Ronen	IL	DNC		Obama	Chicago Sun-Times	
T. J. Rooney	PA	DNC	State Chair	Clinton	Patriot-News	
James Roosevelt Jr.	MA	DNC		Uncommitted		
Eliseo Roques-Arroyo	PR	DNC		Uncommitted		
Chuck Ross Jr.	VT	DNC		Obama	Brattleboro Reformer	
Mike Ross	AR	Representative	Originally supported Clinton	Obama	ArkansasBusiness.com	09 Jun 2008
Steve Rothman	NJ	Representative		Obama	AP	
Randy Roy	KS	DNC		Obama	AP.	
Lucille Roybal-Allard	CA	Representative		Clinton	HillaryClinton.com	27 Jun 2007
Dora Rubio	CA	Add-on		Clinton	Mercury News	18 May 2008
Ruth Rudy	PA	DNC	Nat'l Fed. of Dem. Women	Clinton	Centre Daily Times	
Rhett Ruggerio	DE	DNC	Originally supported Clinton	Obama	DCW	03 Jun 2008
Dutch Ruppersberger	MD	Representative	Originally supported Clinton	Obama	HometownAnnapolis.com	12 Jun 2008
Bobby Rush	IL	Representative		Obama	BarackObama.com	
Tim Ryan	OH	Representative	Originally supported Clinton	Obama	DCW	06 Jun 2008
R. T. Rybak	MN	Add-on	Mayor of Minneapolis	Obama	DCW	08 Jun 2008
Mirian Saez	CA	DNC		Clinton	HillaryClinton.com	27 Apr 2007
John Salazar	CO	Representative		Obama	DCW	04 Jun 2008
Ken Salazar	CO	Senator		Obama	DCW	04 Jun 2008
Christine "Roz" Samuels	NJ	DNC		Obama	MSNBC	
Annadelle Sanchez	NM	DNC	State Vice Chair	Clinton	Albuquerque Tribune	
Linda Sánchez	CA	Representative		Obama	New York Times	
Loretta Sanchez	CA	Representative		Clinton	HillaryClinton.com	18 Jan 2008
Raymond G. Sánchez	NM	DNC		Clinton	Albuquerque Tribune	
Everett Sanders	MS	DNC		Obama	Time	09 Mar 2008
Stephanie Herseth Sandlin	SD	Representative		Obama	Rapid City Journal	26 Feb 2008
John Sarbanes	MD	Representative		Obama	PolitickerMD.com	03 Jun 2008
Gray Sasser	TN	DNC	State Chair	Obama	DCW	04 Jun 2008
Nathaniel Savali	AS	DNC		Clinton	HillaryClinton.com	
Diane Saxe	MA	DNC		Clinton	Lowell Sun	
Richard Schaffer	NY	DNC		Clinton	New York Times	
Jan Schakowsky	IL	Representative		Obama	The New Republic	
Brian Schatz	HI	DNC	State Chair (elected 25 May)	Obama	Honolulu Advertiser	25 May 2008
Adam Schiff	CA	Representative		Obama	CBS 2	
Melissa Schroeder	WI	DNC		Obama	Time.	14 Mar 2008
Debbie Wasserman Schultz	FL*	Representative	Originally supported Clinton	Obama	BarackObama.com	05 Jun 2008
Chuck Schumer	NY	Senator	Originally supported Clinton	Obama	The Hill	08 Jun 2008
Allyson Schwartz	PA	Representative	Originally supported Clinton	Obama	AllysonSchwartz.com	07 Jun 2008
Brian Schweitzer	MT	Governor		Obama	DCW	03 Jun 2008
Bobby Scott	VA	Representative		Obama	AP	20 Dec 2007
David Scott	GA	Representative		Obama	CNN	
Kathleen Sebelius	KS	Governor		Obama	AP	29 Jan 2008
Jerome Wiley Segovia	VA	DNC		Obama	New York Times	02 Jun 2008
José Serrano	NY	Representative	Originally supported Clinton	Obama	ABC News	05 Jun 2008
Joe Sestak	PA	Representative	Originally supported Clinton	Obama	SestakforCongress.com	09 Jun 2008
Lottie Shackelford	AR	DNC	DNC Vice Chair	Uncommitted		
Garry Shay	CA	DNC	Originally supported Clinton	Obama	BarackObama.com	06 Jun 2008
Carol Shea-Porter	NH	Representative		Obama	BarackObama.com	11 Dec 2007
Brad Sherman	CA	Representative		Clinton	HillaryClinton.com	30 Nov 2007
Richard Shoemaker	MI*	DNC	Vice President of UAW	Obama	USA Today	10 Jun 2008
Heath Shuler	NC	Representative		Clinton	AP	7 May 2008
Sheldon Silver	NY	DNC		Clinton	HillaryClinton.com	
Ron Sims	WA	DNC	Nat'l Dem. County Officials; Originally supported Clinton	Obama	DCW	03 Jun 2008
Alex Sink	FL*	Add-on		Uncommitted		
Albio Sires	NJ	Representative		Clinton	HillaryClinton.com	22 Jun 2007
Ike Skelton	MO	Representative		Clinton	AP	29 Apr 2008
Bob Slagle	TX	DNC		Clinton	New York Times	
Dan Slater	CO	DNC	State Vice Chair	Obama	Denver Post	
Louise Slaughter	NY	Representative	Originally supported Clinton	Obama	ABC News	05 Jun 2008
Marva Smalls	SC	DNC		Clinton	New York Times	
Adam Smith	WA	Representative		Obama	Politico.com	
Edward Smith	IL	DNC		Obama	WBBM, Chicago	
Elizabeth Smith	DC	DNC		Clinton	HillaryClinton.com	
Nathan Smith	KY	DNC	State Vice Chair	Uncommitted		
Sharon Smith	WA	Add-on		Uncommitted		
Harriet Smith Windsor	DE	DNC	State Vice Chair	Obama	DCW	03 Jun 2008
Vic Snyder	AR	Representative	Originally supported Clinton	Obama	ArkansasBusiness.com	09 Jun 2008
Hilda Solis	CA	Representative		Clinton	hildasolis.org	17 Oct 2007
Alan Solomont	MA	DNC		Obama	The Boston Globe	
Anna Whiting Sorrell	MT	Add-on		Obama	DCW	07 Jun 2008
Zack Space	OH	Representative		Obama	BarackObama.com	05 Jun 2008
Cindy Spanyers	AK	DNC		Obama	DCW	19 May 2008
Jackie Speier	CA	Representative		Clinton	New York Times	10 Apr 2008
Sam Spencer	ME	DNC		Obama	DCW	03 Jun 2008
Marianne Spraggins	NY	DNC		Obama	New York Times	
John Spratt	SC	Representative		Obama	The Herald	03 Jun 2008
Lionell Spruill	VA	DNC		Clinton	HillaryClinton.com Newport News Daily Press*	7 May 2007
Debbie Stabenow	MI*	Senator	officially DNC Member; Originally supported Clinton	Obama	MLive.com	08 Jun 2008
Rick Stafford	MN	DNC	Originally supported Clinton	Obama	DCW	03 Jun 2008
Richard Stallings	ID	Add-on	Former Representative	Uncommitted		
Christopher Stampolis	CA	DNC		Clinton	Mercury News	
Marylyn Stapleton	VI	DNC	Territory Vice Chair	Uncommitted		
Pete Stark	CA	Representative		Obama	BarackObama.com	16 May 2008
Michael Steed	MD	DNC		Clinton	HillaryClinton.com	
Irene Stein	NY	DNC		Clinton	AP	02 Jun 2008
Marianne Stevens	ME	DNC	State Vice Chair	Obama	Time	27 Feb 2008
Jackie Stevenson	MN	DNC		Clinton	HillaryClinton.com	29 Jun 2007
Crystal Strait	CA	DNC	Young Dems of America	Obama	DCW	11 May 2008
David Strauss	ND	DNC	State Chair	Obama	KFYR-TV	04 Jun 2008
Paul Strauss	DC	Senator	Shadow Senator	Obama	Washington City Paper	26 Feb 2008
Robert S. Strauss	TX	DPL	Former DNC Chairman	Uncommitted		
Dr. Marie Dolly Strazar	HI	DNC		Obama	BarackObama.com	12 May 2008
John Street	PA	Add-on	Former Mayor of Philadelphia	Clinton	DCW	07 Jun 2008
Ted Strickland	OH	Governor	Originally supported Clinton	Obama	MSNBC	05 Jun 2008
Todd Stroger	IL	Add-on	President of the Cook County Board	Obama	AP	5 May 2008
Sharon Stroschein	SD	DNC		Obama	Rapid City Journal	02 Feb 2008
Bart Stupak	MI*	Representative		Obama	DCW	03 Jun 2008
Kathy Sullivan	NH	Add-on	Former State Chair	Clinton	AP	26 Apr 2008
Tim Sullivan	WI	DNC		Clinton	Milwaukee Journal Sentinel	
Betty Sutton	OH	Representative	Originally supported Clinton	Obama	DCW	05 Jun 2008
Susan Swecker	VA	DNC		Clinton	HillaryClinton.com	7 May 2007
John Sweeney	MD	DNC		Uncommitted		
Sarah Swisher	IA	DNC	State Vice Chair	Obama	AP	15 Feb 2008
Taling Taitano	GU	DNC		Clinton	Marianas Variety	
John Tanner	TN	Representative		Clinton	Nashville Post	23 Apr 2008
Michael Tardiff	MI*	DNC	Aide to Detroit mayor Kwame Kilpatrick	Obama	AP	03 Jun 2008
Ellen Tauscher	CA	Representative		Clinton	HillaryClinton.com	18 Jul 2007
Gene Taylor	MS	Representative	Probably will not attend national convention.	Uncommitted		
Lena Taylor	WI	DNC	State Vice Chair	Obama	MSNBC	14 May 2008
John Temporiti	MO	DNC	State Chair	Obama	DCW	03 Jun 2008
Inez Tenenbaum	SC	Add-on	Former State Superintendent of Education	Obama	AP	3 May 2008
Jon Tester	MT	Senator		Obama	DCW	03 Jun 2008
Harry Thomas Jr.	DC	Add-on	District Councilmember	Obama	DC Wire	15 Apr 2008
Bennie Thompson	MS	Representative		Obama	Baltimore Sun	
Mike Thompson	CA	Representative	Originally supported Clinton	Obama	Times-Standard	10 Jun 2008
Senfronia Thompson	TX	DNC		Obama	Houston Chronicle	27 Feb 2008
Connie Thurman	IN	DNC		Obama	Indianapolis Star	22 Feb 2008
Karen Thurman	FL*	DNC	State Chair	Uncommitted		
Mike Thurmond	GA	DNC	State Vice Chair; Originally supported Clinton	Obama	DCW	03 Jun 2008
John Tierney	MA	Representative		Uncommitted		
Ed Tinsley	MT	DNC		Obama	Great Falls Tribune	
Dina Titus	NV	DNC		Clinton	HillaryClinton.com	
Andrew Tobias	FL*	DNC	Treasurer	Uncommitted		
Sylvia Tokasz	NY	DNC		Clinton	Buffalo News	18 Feb 2008
Art Torres	CA	DNC	State Chair	Uncommitted		
Norma Torres	CA	DNC		Obama	Mercury News	
Edolphus Towns	NY	Representative	Originally supported Clinton	Obama	MSNBC	05 Jun 2008
Kathleen Kennedy Townsend	MD	Add-on	Former Lt. Governor	Clinton	The Baltimore Sun	3 May 2008
Christine Trujillo	NM	DNC		Clinton	Albuquerque Tribune	
Niki Tsongas	MA	Representative		Obama	DCW	05 Jun 2008
Togiola Tulafono	AS	Governor		Clinton	The Honolulu Advertiser	11 Jan 2008
Susan Turnbull	MD	DNC	DNC Vice Chair	Uncommitted		
Joe Turnham	AL	DNC	State Chair	Uncommitted		
Mark Udall	CO	Representative		Obama	DCW	04 Jun 2008
Tom Udall	NM	Representative		Obama	DCW	04 Jun 2008
Keith Umemoto	CA	DNC		Clinton	AP	16 May 2008
Karen Valentine	DE	DNC		Clinton	New York Times	
Chris Van Hollen	MD	Representative	Member of the "Pelosi Club"† since May 24, 2008	Obama	DCW	04 Jun 2008
Nydia Velázquez	NY	Representative	Originally supported Clinton	Obama	ABC News	05 Jun 2008
Pete Visclosky	IN	Representative		Obama	Post-Tribune	14 May 2008
Pat Waak	CO	DNC	State Chair	Obama	The Page	28 May 2008
Jack Wagner	PA	Add-on	Auditor General of PA	Obama	DCW	07 Jun 2008
Mary Wakefield	ND	DNC	State Vice Chair	Obama	Bismarck Tribune	08 Jan 2008
John E. Walsh	MA	DNC	State Chair	Obama	The Boston Globe	12 Feb 2008
Tim Walz	MN	Representative		Obama	Star Tribune	02 Feb 2008
Alicia Wang	CA	DNC		Clinton	HillaryClinton.com	16 May 2007
Everett Ward	NC	DNC		Obama	The News & Observer	02 Feb 2008
Carolyn Warner	AZ	DNC		Clinton	Tucson Citizen	
Christine Warnke	DC	DNC	Nat'l Dem. Ethnic Coord. Comm.	Uncommitted		
Maxine Waters	CA	Representative	officially DNC Member; Originally supported Clinton	Obama	CNN	03 Jun 2008
Vernon Watkins	CA	DNC	Retired union member	Obama	USA Today	9 May 2008
Diane Watson	CA	Representative		Clinton	New America Media	27 Sep 2007
Mel Watt	NC	Representative		Obama	The Charlotte Observer	16 Apr 2008
Henry Waxman	CA	Representative		Obama	The Boston Globe	15 May 2008
Laurie Weahkee	NM	Add-on		Obama	New Mexico Independent	9 May 2008
Jim Webb	VA	Senator		Obama	BarackObama.com	05 Jun 2008
Anthony Weiner	NY	Representative	Originally supported Clinton	Obama	ABC News	05 Jun 2008
Mark Weiner	RI	DNC		Clinton	Boston.com	
Randi Weingarten	NY	DNC		Clinton	United Federation of Teachers	
Peter Welch	VT	Representative		Obama	Brattleboro Reformer	
Robert Wexler	FL*	Representative	Endorsed Obama, but would vote Clinton if she leads in pledged delegates.	Obama	DCW	22 May 2008
Yolanda Wheat	MO	DNC	State Vice Chair	Obama	DCW	03 Jun 2008
Sheldon Whitehouse	RI	Senator	Originally supported Clinton	Obama	The Providence Journal	09 Jun 2008
Reggie Whitten	OK	Add-on	State Party Finance Chair	Obama	Tulsa World, Time	17 Apr 2008
Chris Whittington	LA	DNC	State Chair	Clinton	DCW	02 Jun 2008
Jo Etta Wickliffe	KY	DNC		Clinton	Lexington Herald-Leader	
Richard Wiener	MI*	DNC	former state Democratic Party chairman	Obama	Atlantic	03 Jun 2008
Mark Wilcox	AR	Add-on	State Land Commissioner; Originally supported Clinton	Obama	ArkansasBusiness.com	09 Jun 2008
David Wilhelm	OH	DPL	Former DNC Chairman	Obama	AP	13 Feb 2008
Donald E. Williams	CT	Add-on	State Senator	Obama	New York Times	08 Jan 2008
Darlena Williams-Burnett	IL	DNC		Obama	DCW, Chicago Sun-Times	05 Mar 2008
Charlie Wilson	OH	Representative		Obama	Vindy.com	07 Jun 2008
Joe Wineke	WI	DNC	State Chair	Obama	Milwaukee Journal Sentinel	1 Mar 2008
Lauren Wolfe	MI*	DNC	College Dems of America National Pres.	Obama	YouTube	13 May 2008
Margie Woods	IL	DNC	Nat'l Dem. County Officials	Obama	Time	17 Mar 2008
Meredith Woods-Smith	OR	DNC	State Chair	Obama	The Oregonian	28 May 2008
Lynn Woolsey	CA	Representative	Endorsed Clinton, but will vote Obama if he leads in the popular vote.	Uncommitted		
Nancy Worley	AL	DNC	State Vice Chair	Uncommitted		
Jim Wright	TX	DPL	Former Speaker of the House	Clinton	Statesman.com	06 Feb 2008
David Wu	OR	Representative		Obama	KPTV	24 Apr 2008
Ron Wyden	OR	Senator		Obama	BlueOregon	04 Jun 2008
Rosalind Wiener Wyman	CA	DNC		Clinton	HillaryClinton.com	27 Apr 2007
Margaret Xifaras	MA	DNC		Obama	The Boston Globe	21 Feb 2008
John Yarmuth	KY	Representative		Obama	The Courier-Journal	08 Feb 2008
Steve Ybarra	CA	DNC		Uncommitted		
Paula Zellner	WI	DNC		Obama	AP.	04 Jun 2008
Robert Zimmerman	NY	DNC		Clinton	The New York Observer	
James Zogby	DC	DNC		Obama	BarackObama.com	19 Dec 2007
Vacant (Tom Lakin resigned)	IL	DNC	Illinois can choose this delegate.	Vacant		
Vacant (John Stroger died)		DNC	At-Large, unassigned	Vacant		
Vacant (Stephanie Tubbs Jones died)	OH			Vacant		
Vacant		DNC	At-Large, unassigned	Vacant		

==== Notes ====
* Democrats Abroad superdelegates have ½ vote. [Florida and Michigan delegations not yet un-marked.]

↔ Gov. Ed Rendell (PA), Sen. Robert Byrd (WV), and Sen. Chris Dodd (CT) are credentialed by the DNC as Distinguished Party Leaders

↓ Rep. Brad Ellsworth (IN) has committed to vote for Clinton in deference to their constituents' votes in the state primaries. They explicitly distinguish this from an "endorsement" and have not personally endorsed either candidate.

Ж Commit Date is the actual date of commitment or earliest instance of public support. For reasons of file size management, candidate-by-candidate citations may not be provided. The best source of this information is from the press releases and blog entries of the candidate websites: hillaryclinton.com and barackobama.com. January 20, 2007, is the date Senator Hillary Clinton opened her exploratory committee for the Presidential Democratic nomination and is thus considered the first date that a superdelegate can endorse her. February 10, 2007 is the date Senator Barack Obama announced his candidacy for the Presidential Democratic nomination and is thus considered the first date that a superdelegate can endorse him.

† The "Pelosi Club" is an informal name for a group of superdelegates who announced their intention to vote for the candidate who won the absolute majority of pledged delegates(Barack Obama). The group is named for its first two members, House Speaker Rep. Nancy Pelosi (CA) and her daughter Christine Pelosi (CA DNC), who announced their intention on March 30. The group prominently includes Former President Jimmy Carter (GA DPL, announced May 1); other members are Sen. Maria Cantwell (WA), Denise Johnson (TX; April 6), and Rep. Chris Van Hollen (MD, May 24). Somewhat confusingly, Sen. Cantwell is on record endorsing Clinton, but she has vowed to vote for the pledged delegate leader. [Note: Please do *not* move these delegates to Obama's column without a specific endorsement first since it is only a conditional pledge, per DCW May 20 update.]

There are also 'former members' of the Pelosi Club. All of the following have since gone on to become outright Obama delegates, and are listed here together with the date they were recognized as such: Former DNC Chair Roy Romer (CO DPL, May 13). Rep. Zoe Lofgren (CA, May 22), former Sen. Tom Daschle (SD DPL, May 22), Rep. Robert Wexler (FL, May 22), and charter Pelosi Club member Betty Richie (TX DNC, May 29).

=== History of superdelegate composition changes ===
Date	Total	Name	Effect	Notes
25 Aug 2008	852	14.5 MI, 13 FL Superdelegates	27.5↑ Total	All 29 MI and 26 FL superdelegates restored by DNC, with a full vote.
20 Aug 2008	824.5	Rebecca Gwatney (AR)	= Total	Elected by AR DNC to replace Bill Gwatney.
20 Aug 2008	824.5	Stephanie Tubbs Jones (OH)	= Total	died, creating vacancy.
13 Aug 2008	824.5	Bill Gwatney (AR)	= Total	died, creating vacancy (DNC – State Chair).
17 Jun 2008	824.5	Representative Donna Edwards (MD-04)	↑ Total ↑ Obama	Won MD-04 special election (Albert Wynn's seat)
31 May 2008	823.5	14.5 MI Superdelegates	14.5↑ Total	All MI superdelegates restored by DNC, each with half a vote.
31 May 2008	809	13 FL Superdelegates	13↑ Total	All FL superdelegates restored by DNC, each with half a vote.
20 May 2008	796	Representative Travis Childers (MS-01)	↑ Total	Won MS-01 special election, May 13. (Roger Wicker's seat)
3 May 2008	795	Representative Don Cazayoux (LA-06)	↑ Total	Won LA-06 special election (Richard Baker's seat)
26 Apr 2008	794	Charlene Fernandez (AZ)	= Total ↑ Obama	Elected state vice chair (filling vacancy)
08 Apr 2008	794	Representative Jackie Speier (CA-12)	↑ Total ↑ Clinton	Won CA-12 special election (Tom Lantos' seat)
04 Apr 2008	793	Reginald LaFayette (NY)	= Total ↑ Clinton	Became highest ranking man in state party
04 Apr 2008	793	Dave Pollak (NY)	= Total ↓ Clinton	Resigned position as State Vice Chair
27 Mar 2008	793	Representative Albert Wynn (MD-04)	↓ Total ↓ Obama	Resigned, effective May 31, 2008
18 Mar 2008	794	Jennifer DeChant (ME)	= Total	Substitutes for Rita Moran
17 Mar 2008	794	John Melcher (MT)	= Total ↑ Obama	Vacancy at National Democratic Seniors Coordinating Council filled
17 Mar 2008	794	Mayor Brenda Lawrence (Southfield, MI)	↓ Total	Vacancy at National Conference of Democratic Mayors filled by a Mayor from Michigan (stripped)
17 Mar 2008	795	Governor Eliot Spitzer (NY)	↓ Total ↓ Clinton	Resigned. New governor, David Paterson, was already a superdelegate (DNC, at-large)
15 Mar 2008	796	Elsie Burkhalter (LA)	= Total	Elected highest ranking woman in state party
15 Mar 2008	796	Mary Lou Winters (LA)	= Total ↓ Clinton	Completed term in state party
13 Mar 2008	796	Representative André Carson (IN-07)	↑ Total ↑ Obama	Won IN-07 special election (Julia Carson's seat)
08 Mar 2008	795	Representative Bill Foster (IL-14)	↑ Total ↑ Obama	Won IL-14 special election
19 Feb 2008	794	Teresa Benitez-Thompson (NV)	= Total ↑ Obama	Became State Vice Chair upon Jill Derby's resignation.
19 Feb 2008	794	Jill Derby (NV)	= Total	Resigned as State Chair and immediately replaced.
19 Feb 2008	794	Grace Diaz (RI)	= Total ↑ Clinton	Appointed State Vice Chair filling vacancy.
16 Feb 2008	794	Cheryl Chapman (SD)	= Total	Elected State Vice Chair filling vacancy.
13 Feb 2008	794	DPL Kenneth M. Curtis	↓ Total ↓ Clinton	Relocated from Maine to Florida (stripped)
11 Feb 2008	795	Representative Tom Lantos (CA-12)	↓ Total ↓ Clinton	died
28 Jan 2008	796	Donna Branch Gilby (AZ)	= Total	Resigned as State Vice Chair creating vacancy.
25 Jan 2008	796	Catherine Cortez Masto (NV)	= Total	Vacancy at Democratic Attorneys General Association filled
25 Jan 2008	796	Mayor David Cicilline (Providence, RI)	= Total ↑ Clinton	Elected president of the National Conference of Democratic Mayors.
25 Jan 2008	796	Mayor Shirley Franklin (Atlanta, GA)	= Total ↓ Obama	Completed term as president of the National Conference of Democratic Mayors.
18 Jan 2008	796	John Stroger (IL)	= Total	died creating vacancy (DNC At-Large).
15 Jan 2008	796	Governor Kathleen Blanco (LA)	↓ Total	left office; replaced by Republican Bobby Jindal
Dec 2007	797	Bill Orton (UT)	= Total = Obama	For a short time removed by DNC for missing three meetings. Subsequently reinstated.
15 Dec 2007	797	Representative Julia Carson (IN-07)	↓ Total	died
11 Dec 2007	798	Governor Steve Beshear (KY)	↑ Total	sworn in; replaced Republican Governor Ernie Fletcher
1 Dec 2007	797	All 28 MI Superdelegates	28↓ Total	All MI Superdelegates lost their vote when DNC sanctioned the state.
05 Oct 2007	825	All 25 FL Superdelegates	25↓ Total	All FL Superdelegates lost their vote when DNC sanctioned the state.
	850			Initial number of superdelegates counted by DNC
