= Wyoming's 17th House of Representatives district =

American legislative district

Wyoming's 17th State House of Representatives district
- Wyoming's 17th House of Representatives district as of 2022
Representative
J.T. Larson; R–Rock Springs
- Demographics: 74% White; 2% Black; 18% Hispanic; 1% Asian; 1% Other; 4% Multiracial
- Population (2022): 7,892

Wyoming's 17th House of Representatives district is one of 62 districts in the Wyoming House of Representatives. The district encompasses part of Sweetwater County. It is represented by Republican Representative J.T. Larson of Rock Springs.

In 1992, the state of Wyoming switched from electing state legislators by county to a district-based system.

== List of members representing the district ==
Representative	Party	Term	Note
Ray Sarcletti	Democratic	1993 – 1995	Elected in 1992.
Fred Parady	Republican	1995 – 2005	Elected in 1994. Re-elected in 1996. Re-elected in 1998. Re-elected in 2000. Re-elected in 2002.
Stephen Watt	Republican	2005 – 2007	Elected in 2004.
Bernadine Craft	Democratic	2007 – 2013	Elected in 2006. Re-elected in 2008. Re-elected in 2010.
Stephen Watt	Republican	2013 – 2015	Elected in 2012.
JoAnn Dayton-Selman	Democratic	2015 – 2021	Elected in 2014. Re-elected in 2016. Re-elected in 2018.
Chad Banks	Democratic	2021 – 2023	Elected in 2020.
J.T. Larson	Republican	2023 – present	Elected in 2022. Re-elected in 2024.
Elizabeth Bingham	Republican	2027 – member-elect	Elected in 2026.

== Recent election results ==
=== 2014 ===
House district 17 general election
Party	Candidate	Votes	%
Democratic	JoAnn Dayton-Selman	1,218	57.58%
Republican	Stephen Watt (Incumbent)	894	42.26%
Write-ins		3	0.14%
Total votes		2,115	100.0%
Invalid or blank votes		75	
Democratic gain from Republican			

=== 2016 ===
House district 17 general election
Party	Candidate	Votes	%
Democratic	JoAnn Dayton-Selman (Incumbent)	2,177	95.90%
Write-ins		93	4.09%
Total votes		2,270	100.0%
Invalid or blank votes		804	
Democratic hold			

=== 2018 ===
House district 17 general election
Party	Candidate	Votes	%
Democratic	JoAnn Dayton-Selman (Incumbent)	1,240	59.27%
Republican	Traci Ciepiela	841	40.20%
Write-ins		11	0.52%
Total votes		2,092	100.0%
Invalid or blank votes		268	
Democratic hold			

=== 2020 ===
House district 17 general election
Party	Candidate	Votes	%
Democratic	Chad Banks	1,822	92.48%
Write-ins		148	7.51%
Total votes		1,970	100.0%
Invalid or blank votes		857	
Democratic hold			

=== 2022 ===
House district 17 general election
Party	Candidate	Votes	%
Republican	J.T. Larson	1,389	60.76%
Democratic	Chad Banks (Incumbent)	895	39.15%
Write-ins		2	0.08%
Total votes		2,286	100.0%
Invalid or blank votes		59	
Republican gain from Democratic			

=== 2024 ===
House district 17 general election
Party	Candidate	Votes	%
Republican	J.T. Larson (Incumbent)	2,590	95.50%
Write-ins		122	4.49%
Total votes		2,712	100.0%
Invalid or blank votes		552	
Republican hold			

== Historical district boundaries ==
Map	Description	Apportionment Plan	Notes
	Sweetwater County (part)	1992 Apportionment Plan	
	Sweetwater County (part)	2002 Apportionment Plan	
	Sweetwater County (part)	2012 Apportionment Plan	
