= Chad Banks =

American politician

Member of the Wyoming House of Representatives from the 17th district
- In office January 12, 2021 – January 10, 2023
- Preceded by: JoAnn Dayton-Selman
- Succeeded by: J.T. Larson

Personal details
- Party: Democratic

Chad Banks is an American politician and Democratic former member of the Wyoming House of Representatives, representing the 17th district from January 12, 2021 until January 10, 2023.

A resident of Rock Springs, prior to his election to the state legislature he served as manager of the Rock Springs Main Street/Urban Renewal Agency, and previously served on the city council. He is a graduate of the University of Wyoming and Western Wyoming Community College.

He was one of three LGBT legislators in the current legislative session, alongside the reelected Cathy Connolly and Dan Zwonitzer, and the fourth out LGBT legislator in state history following the defeat of Sara Burlingame.
