= Mike Gierau =

American politician (born 1959)

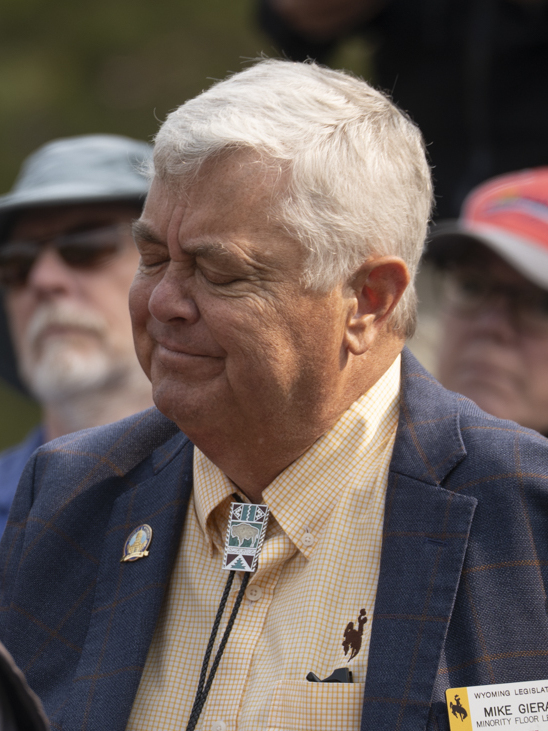
- Gierau in 2025

Minority Leader of the Wyoming Senate
- Incumbent
- Assumed office January 14, 2025
- Preceded by: Chris Rothfuss

Member of the Wyoming Senate from the 17th district
- Incumbent
- Assumed office January 7, 2019
- Preceded by: Leland Christensen

Member of the Wyoming House of Representatives from the 16th district
- In office January 10, 2017 – January 7, 2019
- Preceded by: Ruth Petroff
- Succeeded by: Mike Yin

Personal details
- Born: Michael Frank Gierau; March 18, 1959 (age 67) Klamath Falls, Oregon, U.S.
- Party: Democratic
- Spouse: Paty Gierau
- Education: American River College (attended); San Francisco State University (attended)

Michael Frank Gierau (born March 18, 1959) is an American politician and who is a member of the Wyoming Senate, representing District 17 since 2019. A Democrat, he served in the Wyoming House of Representatives representing District 16 from 2017 until 2019.

== Career ==
Prior to his election to the Wyoming House of Representatives, Gierau served on the Jackson Hole City Council and Teton County Board of Commissioners. Gierau has been the owner of Jedediah Corporation in Jackson since 1980.

Gierau was one of four Wyoming superdelegates to the 2016 Democratic National Convention. During the convention roll call, all four superdelegates endorsed Hillary Clinton for President over Bernie Sanders.

== Elections ==
=== 2016 ===
When incumbent Republican Representative Ruth Petroff announced her retirement, Gierau announced his candidacy for the seat. Gierau ran unopposed for the Democratic nomination and was unopposed for the general election.

=== 2018 ===
When incumbent Republican state senator Leland Christensen ran for state treasurer and did not seek reelection in the State Senate, Gierau ran to fill his seat. Gierau was unopposed in the Democratic primary, and defeated Republican Kate Mead in the general election.

Senate District 17 General Election
Party	Candidate	Votes	%
Democratic	Mike Gierau	6,008	62.27%
Republican	Kate Mead	3,631	37.67%
Write-In	Write-In	9	0.09%
Total votes		9,648	100.00%
Majority		2,377	24.63%
Invalid or blank votes		205	N/A
Democratic gain from Republican			

Wyoming Senate
Preceded by Chris Rothfuss	Minority Leader of the Wyoming Senate; 2025–present	Incumbent
