= Sam Blackwell =

American politician (1930–2017)

Member of the Wyoming House of Representatives
- In office January 11, 1983 – 1995
- Succeeded by: Kenilynn S. Zanetti
- Constituency: Sweetwater County (1983-1992); 16th district (1993-1995)

Personal details
- Born: Samuel Eugene Blackwell; August 31, 1930 Superior, Wyoming, U.S.
- Died: February 7, 2017 (aged 86) Aurora, Colorado, U.S.
- Party: Democratic
- Spouse: Beverly Joan Shroyer
- Children: 3
- Parent(s): Thomas Eugene Blackwell; Panzey Fay Blackwell
- Education: Superior High School
- Profession: Politician

Military service
- Allegiance: United States
- Branch/service: United States Army
- Battles/wars: Korean War

Samuel Eugene Blackwell (August 31, 1930 – February 7, 2017) was an American politician from Rock Springs, Wyoming, who served in the Wyoming House of Representatives from 1983 to 1995, first representing Sweetwater County and then representing the 16th district as a Democrat.

== Early life and education ==
Blackwell was born in Superior, Wyoming, on August 31, 1930, to Thomas Eugene and Panzey Fay Blackwell. He graduated from Superior High School in 1949.

== Career ==
Blackwell enlisted in the United States Army on September 12, 1949. He served in the Korean War prior to being discharged on October 1, 1952.

Blackwell worked as a mailman at a hospital in Sheridan, Wyoming. He was employed by Halliburton from 1956 to 1965. Blackwell subsequently worked at the FMC of Wyoming from 1965 to his retirement in 1992.

Blackwell served in the Wyoming House of Representatives from 1983 to 1995. (Note: According to the Wyoming Legislature, Blackwell served from 1983 to 1994.) Initially, he represented Sweetwater County. In 1992, the Wyoming Legislature switched from a county-based system to a numbered district based system. For his final term, Blackwell was elected to represent the 16th House district. Blackwell was a Democrat.

During his time in office, Blackwell served on the following standing committees:

- Mines, Minerals and Industrial Development (1983–1984)
- Mines and Minerals (1985–1987)
- Travel, Recreation and Wildlife (1985–1990)
- Minerals, Business and Economic Development (1988–1990)
- Labor, Health and Social Services (1991–1994)
- Revenue (1991–1994)

Blackwell also served on the Management Council from 1993 to 1994.

Outside the Wyoming Legislature, Blackwell served on various other boards throughout his life, including the South West Rehabilitation Center and the Young at Heart Citizen's Center.

== Personal life and death ==
On January 10, 1953, Blackwell married Beverley Joan Shroyer—whom he met while working as a mailman—in Sheridan, Wyoming. They had three children together.

Blackwell died at the age of 86 in Aurora, Colorado, on February 7, 2017.

== Notes ==
Wyoming House of Representatives
Preceded by —	Member of the Wyoming House of Representatives; 1983–1995	Succeeded by Kenilynn S. Zanetti
