= J.T. Larson =

American politician (born 2001)

Member of the Wyoming House of Representatives from the 17th district
- Incumbent
- Assumed office January 10, 2023
- Preceded by: Chad Banks
- Succeeded by: Elizabeth Bingham (elect)

Personal details
- Born: Joshua Thomas Larson; April 6, 2001 (age 25) Rock Springs, Wyoming, U.S.
- Party: Republican
- Education: Western Wyoming Community College (AS)
- Profession: Business agent

Joshua Thomas "J.T." Larson (born April 6, 2001) is an American politician and a Republican member of the Wyoming House of Representatives representing the 17th district since January 10, 2023.

== Political career ==
Larson challenged incumbent Democratic representative Chad Banks, winning the Republican primary on August 16, 2022, unopposed. He then won the general election on November 8, 2022, defeating Banks with 61% of the vote.
