= Kenilynn S. Zanetti =

Wyoming politician

Member of the Wyoming House of Representatives from the 16th district
- In office 1995–2000
- Preceded by: Sam Blackwell
- Succeeded by: Stephen Watt

Personal details
- Party: Democratic

Kenilynn S. Zanetti is an American Democratic politician from Rock Springs, Wyoming. She represented the 16th district in the Wyoming House of Representatives from 1995 to 2000.
