= JoAnn Dayton-Selman =

American politician

Member of the Wyoming House of Representatives from the 17th district
- In office January 5, 2015 – January 12, 2021
- Preceded by: Stephen Watt
- Succeeded by: Chad Banks

Personal details
- Born: Everett, Washington, U.S.
- Party: Democratic
- Spouse: Mike Dayton (deceased)
- Children: 2

JoAnn Dayton-Selman is an American politician and former Wyoming state legislator. A member of the Democratic Party, Dayton-Selman represented the 17th district in the Wyoming House of Representatives from 2015 to 2021.

== Elections ==
=== 2012 ===
Dayton-Selman ran unopposed in the Democratic primary to replace Bernadine Craft, who was running for the Wyoming Senate. She faced former Republican State Representative Stephen Watt in the general election and lost 55% to 45%.

=== 2014 ===
Dayton-Selman ran unopposed in the Democratic primary, setting up a rematch against Watt. She defeated Watt, 58% to 42%.

=== 2016 ===
Dayton-Selman ran unopposed in both the Democratic primary and general election.

=== 2018 ===
Dayton-Selman ran unopposed in the Democratic primary. She defeated Republican nominee Traci Ciepiela, who had withdrawn from the race on October 31.
