= Liisa Anselmi-Dalton =

American politician

Member of the Wyoming Senate from the 12th district
- In office January 10, 2017 – January 4, 2021
- Preceded by: Bernadine Craft
- Succeeded by: John Kolb

Personal details
- Born: Rock Springs, Wyoming, U.S.
- Party: Democratic
- Spouse: Dan Dalton
- Children: 2
- Education: University of Notre Dame; Duke University School of Law
- Profession: Business owner

Liisa Anselmi-Dalton is an American politician and a former Democratic member of the Wyoming Senate, having represented District 12 from January 10, 2017, until January 4, 2021.

== Career ==
Prior to her election to the Wyoming Senate, Anselmi-Dalton served on the Sweetwater County Travel and Tourism Board. In 2013, Wyoming Governor Matt Mead appointed Anselmi-Dalton to the Wyoming Board of Tourism and was subsequently confirmed by the Senate.

Anselmi-Dalton manages several hotels in Rock Springs, Wyoming.

== Elections ==
=== 2016 ===
When incumbent Democratic Senator Bernadine Craft announced her retirement, Anselmi-Dalton announced her candidacy for the seat. Anselmi-Dalton ran unopposed for the Democratic nomination and was unopposed for the general election.
