= John Kolb =

American politician

Member of the Wyoming Senate from the 12th district
- Incumbent
- Assumed office January 4, 2021
- Preceded by: Liisa Anselmi-Dalton

Personal details
- Party: Republican

John Kolb is an American politician. A Republican member of the Wyoming Senate, he has represented District 12 since January 4, 2021.

== Career ==
Kolb is a businessman that has previously served as county commissioner. On November 3, 2020, Kolb defeated the incumbent Democratic state senator, Liisa Anselmi-Dalton for the Wyoming Senate seat representing the 12th district. Kolb was sworn in as State Senator on January 4, 2021.
