= Stephen Watt (politician) =

American politician (born 1956)

Member of the Wyoming House of Representatives from the 17th district
- In office January 8, 2013 – January 5, 2015
- Preceded by: Bernadine Craft
- Succeeded by: JoAnn Dayton
- In office January 11, 2005 – January 9, 2007
- Preceded by: Fred Parady
- Succeeded by: Bernadine Craft

Member of the Wyoming House of Representatives from the 16th district
- In office January 9, 2001 – January 14, 2003
- Preceded by: Kenilynn Zanetti
- Succeeded by: Pete Jorgensen

Personal details
- Born: January 8, 1956 (age 70) Newcastle, Wyoming, U.S.
- Party: Republican
- Education: Chadron State College

Stephen Watt (born January 8, 1956) is an American politician and a former Republican member of the Wyoming House of Representatives. Watt served three non-consecutive terms, representing District 16 from 2001 to 2003 and District 17 from 2005 to 2007 and again from 2013 to 2015. Watt was an unsuccessful candidate for governor of Wyoming in 2002.

== Education ==
Watt was born in Newcastle, Wyoming, and attended Chadron State College in Chadron, Nebraska.

== Elections ==
=== 2000 ===
When Democratic Representative Kenilynn Zanetti retired and left the District 16 seat open, Watt was unopposed for the August 22, 2000 Republican Primary, winning with 500 votes, and won the November 7, 2000 General election with 1,166 votes (51.7%) against Democratic nominee Larry Levitt.

=== 2002 ===
When incumbent Republican Governor of Wyoming Jim Geringer was term limited from seeking a third term, Watt ran in the five-way August 20, 2002 Republican Primary, but lost to Speaker of the Wyoming House of Representatives Eli Bebout. The primary runner-up was Ray Hunkins, a rancher and lawyer from Wheatland. Bebout then lost the general election to Democratic former United States Attorney Dave Freudenthal.

=== 2004 ===
When Republican Representative and former Speaker of the Wyoming House of Representatives Fred Parady retired, Watt ran unopposed for the August 17, 2004 Republican Primary, winning with 547 votes, won the November 2, 2004 General election by 85 votes with 1,540 votes (51.4%) against Democratic nominee Stephen Shea.

=== 2010 ===
Watt challenged incumbent Democratic Representative Bernadine Craft. He was unopposed for the August 17, 2010 Republican Primary, winning with 536 votes, but lost the November 2, 2010 General election to Craft.

=== 2012 ===
When Democratic Representative Bernadine Craft ran for Wyoming Senate and left the House District 17 seat open, Watt was unopposed for the August 21, 2012 Republican Primary, winning with 357 votes, and won the November 6, 2012 General election with 1,680 votes (55.2%) against Democratic nominee JoAnn Dayton.

=== 2014 ===
Watt ran against Democrat JoAnn Dayton in a rematch of the 2012 race. Dayton defeated Watt, with Watt receiving only 42% of the vote compared to Dayton's 58%.
