= Fred Parady =

American politician

57th Speaker of the Wyoming House of Representatives
- In office January 14, 2003 – January 11, 2005
- Preceded by: Rick Tempest
- Succeeded by: Randall Luthi

Member of the Wyoming House of Representatives from the 17th district
- In office January 10, 1995 – January 11, 2005
- Preceded by: Ray Sarcletti
- Succeeded by: Stephen Watt

Personal details
- Born: July 19, 1955 Presque Isle, Maine
- Died: June 16, 2024 (aged 68) Juneau, Alaska
- Party: Republican

Fred Parady (July 19, 1955 – June 16, 2024) was an American politician who served in the Wyoming House of Representatives from the 17th district from 1995 to 2005. He served as the 57th Speaker of the Wyoming House of Representatives from 2003 to 2005.

He died on June 16, 2024, in Juneau, Alaska at age 68.
