= Bill Gwatney =

American politician (1959–2008)

Chair of the Democratic Party of Arkansas
- In office 2007 – August 13, 2008
- Preceded by: Jason Willett
- Succeeded by: David Pryor

Member of the Arkansas Senate from the 19th district
- In office January 11, 1993 – January 13, 2003
- Preceded by: Max Howell
- Succeeded by: Terry Smith

Personal details
- Born: William Alan Gwatney; August 26, 1959 Little Rock, Arkansas, U.S.
- Died: August 13, 2008 (aged 48) Little Rock, Arkansas, U.S.
- Cause of death: Assassination
- Party: Democratic
- Children: 2

William Alan "Bill" Gwatney (August 26, 1959 – August 13, 2008) was an American politician who served as the State Chair of the Democratic Party of Arkansas. He had previously served as a State Senator for ten years and as the financial chair of Mike Beebe's campaign for Governor of Arkansas in 2006. Gwatney was selected as a superdelegate at the 2008 Democratic National Convention, but was assassinated before the convention.

== Assassination ==
On August 13, 2008, Gwatney was shot three times by Timothy Dale Johnson, who entered Democratic Party headquarters in Little Rock, Arkansas. Gwatney was taken to Little Rock University Hospital, but was pronounced dead at 3:59 PM.

The gunman had said he wanted to speak with Gwatney about volunteering, but sidestepped his assistant when she said he was busy. After the shooting, the gunman fled the scene in his truck and led police on a 30-mile (48 km) chase out of Little Rock. Johnson was killed by police after a PIT maneuver forced him off the road into a field near Sheridan. No motive was discovered, except Johnson quitting his job at a Target retail store earlier that day.

== Honors ==
The University of Arkansas at Little Rock (UALR) Athletic Department posthumously inducted Gwatney into their Hall of Fame during a ceremony prior to the tip-off of the men's basketball game vs. New Orleans on February 26, 2009.

== See also ==
- List of assassinated American politicians
- List of superdelegates at the 2008 Democratic National Convention
- 2011 Tucson shooting
