= Ruth Petroff =

American politician (born 1965)

Member of the Wyoming House of Representatives from the 16th district
- In office January 11, 2011 – January 10, 2017
- Preceded by: Pete Jorgensen
- Succeeded by: Mike Gierau

Personal details
- Born: September 17, 1965 (age 60) Philadelphia, Pennsylvania, U.S.
- Party: Republican
- Profession: Business owner
- Website: ruthann.us

Ruth Ann Petroff (born September 17, 1965, in Philadelphia, Pennsylvania) is an American politician and a former Republican member of the Wyoming House of Representatives representing District 16 from January 11, 2011, until January 10, 2017.

== Elections ==
- In 2014, Petroff won the Republican Primary on August 19, unopposed with 521 votes. She was unopposed in the general election, which she won with 1,947 votes.
- In 2012, Petroff won the August 21, 2012 Republican Primary with 460 votes (56.0%), and was unopposed for the November 6, 2012 General election, winning with 2,810 votes.
- In 2010, when Democratic Representative Pete Jorgensen retired and left the District 16 seat open, Petroff won the August 17, 2010 Republican Primary with 951 votes (58.6%), and won the November 2, 2010 General election with 2,150 votes (54.2%) against Democratic nominee Len Carlman.
