= Wyoming's 16th House of Representatives district =

American legislative district

Wyoming's 16th State House of Representatives district
- Wyoming's 16th House of Representatives district as of 2022
Representative
Mike Yin; D–Jackson
- Demographics: 67% White; 1% Black; 24% Hispanic; 2% Asian; 5% Multiracial
- Population (2022): 9,613

Wyoming's 16th House of Representatives district is one of 62 districts in the Wyoming House of Representatives. The district encompasses part of Teton County. It is represented by Democratic Representative Mike Yin of Jackson.

In 1992, the state of Wyoming switched from electing state legislators by county to a district-based system.

== List of members representing the district ==
Representative	Party	Term	Note
Sam Blackwell	Democratic	1993 – 1995	Elected in 1992.
Kenilynn S. Zanetti	Democratic	1995 – 2001	Elected in 1994. Re-elected in 1996. Re-elected in 1998.
Stephen Watt	Republican	2001 – 2003	Elected in 2000.
Pete Jorgensen	Democratic	2003 – 2011	Elected in 2002. Re-elected in 2004. Re-elected in 2006. Re-elected in 2008.
Ruth Petroff	Republican	2011 – 2017	Elected in 2010. Re-elected in 2012. Re-elected in 2014.
Mike Gierau	Democratic	2017 – 2019	Elected in 2016.
Mike Yin	Democratic	2019 – present	Elected in 2018. Re-elected in 2020. Re-elected in 2022. Re-elected in 2024.

== Recent election results ==
=== 2014 ===
House district 16 general election
Party	Candidate	Votes	%
Republican	Ruth Petroff (Incumbent)	1,947	96.86%
Write-ins		63	3.13%
Total votes		2,010	100.0%
Invalid or blank votes		756	
Republican hold			

=== 2016 ===
House district 16 general election
Party	Candidate	Votes	%
Democratic	Mike Gierau	3,740	97.39%
Write-ins		100	2.60%
Total votes		3,840	100.0%
Invalid or blank votes		927	
Democratic gain from Republican			

=== 2018 ===
House district 16 general election
Party	Candidate	Votes	%
Democratic	Mike Yin	2,530	59.58%
Republican	Barbara Allen	1,712	40.32%
Write-ins		4	0.09%
Total votes		4,246	100.0%
Invalid or blank votes		128	
Democratic hold			

=== 2020 ===
House district 16 general election
Party	Candidate	Votes	%
Democratic	Mike Yin (Incumbent)	4,237	96.18%
Write-ins		168	3.81%
Total votes		4,405	100.0%
Invalid or blank votes		963	
Democratic hold			

=== 2022 ===
House district 16 general election
Party	Candidate	Votes	%
Democratic	Mike Yin (Incumbent)	2,477	73.83%
Republican	Jim McCollum	869	25.90%
Write-ins		9	0.26%
Total votes		3,355	100.0%
Invalid or blank votes		88	
Democratic hold			

=== 2024 ===
House district 16 general election
Party	Candidate	Votes	%
Democratic	Mike Yin (Incumbent)	3,545	96.69%
Write-ins		121	3.30%
Total votes		3,666	100.0%
Invalid or blank votes		795	
Democratic hold			

== Historical district boundaries ==
Map	Description	Apportionment Plan	Notes
	Carbon County (part); Fremont County (part); Sweetwater County (part)	1992 Apportionment Plan	
	Teton County (part)	2002 Apportionment Plan	
	Teton County (part)	2012 Apportionment Plan	
