= Bernadine Craft =

American politician

Member of the Wyoming Senate from the 12th district
- In office January 7, 2013 – January 10, 2017
- Preceded by: Marty Martin
- Succeeded by: Liisa Anselmi-Dalton

Member of the Wyoming House of Representatives from the 17th district
- In office January 9, 2007 – January 7, 2013
- Preceded by: Stephen Watt
- Succeeded by: Stephen Watt

Personal details
- Party: Democratic
- Occupation: Educator

Bernadine L. Craft is an American politician and a former Democratic member of the Wyoming State Senate and previously a member of Wyoming House of Representatives, and had represented the 12th district from January 7, 2013 to January 10, 2017.

Craft first ran for and won a seat in the Wyoming House of Representatives in 2006, representing the city of Rock Springs. In 2012, Craft announced that she would run for the 12th district in the Wyoming Senate, replacing outgoing Marty Martin. JoAnn Dayton succeeded Craft as the Democratic nominee, but lost to Stephen Watt. Craft, on the other hand, won the election without any opposition.

Craft was sworn in as a State Senator on January 7, 2013. She was subsequently selected to be Senate Minority Whip.

In addition to being in the Wyoming Senate, Craft serves as Executive Director of the Sweetwater Board of Cooperative Educational Services in Rock Springs, Wyoming. She is also an Episcopal priest, serving at her home parish of Holy Communion Episcopal Church in Rock Springs and Oregon Trail Memorial Church in Eden.

Craft declined to run for reelection in 2016.
