= Pete Jorgensen =

American politician

Member of the Wyoming House of Representatives from the 16th district
- In office 2003–2011
- Preceded by: Stephen Watt
- Succeeded by: Ruth Petroff

Personal details
- Born: June 22, 1935 (age 91)
- Party: Democratic
- Education: Bucknell University

Peter M. Jorgensen (born June 22, 1935) is an American former Democratic member of the Wyoming House of Representatives, representing the 16th district from 2003 to 2011.

== Early life and career ==
Jorgensen graduated from Bucknell University in 1957. He was consulting engineer and surveyor before running for the state legislature.

Jorgensen served as a trustee of the University of Wyoming for fourteen years from 1989 to 2003. He was a member of the Democratic National Committee.
