= Margaret Blackshere =

American labor organizer and leader

Margaret Blackshere (died July 6, 2019) was an American labor organizer and leader. She was the first woman to serve as president of the Illinois AFL-CIO.

== Early life and education ==
Blackshere was raised in North Venice, Illinois.

She received her master's degree in education at Southern Illinois University Edwardsville.

== Career ==
Blackshere began her career as a kindergarten teacher in Madison, Illinois. There, she organized her fellow teachers, leading to the school's teachers becoming affiliated with the Illinois Federation of Teachers, part of the American Federation of Teachers. She served as president of IFT Local 763, and later as statewide vice president of the IFT.

In 1993, Blackshere was elected secretary-treasurer of the Illinois AFL-CIO. In 2000, she was elected president after the organization's first ever contested election. She was the first woman to hold the position in Illinois, and the second woman to lead a state federation in the country. She served as president until her retirement in 2007.

As president, Blackshere engineered an early endorsement of Rod Blagojevich ahead of the 2002 Illinois gubernatorial campaign.

Blackshere was a delegate to the Democratic National Convention and a member of the Democratic National Committee. After retiring from the Illinois AFL-CIO, Blackshere campaigned for Barack Obama across the country during the 2008 Democratic presidential primary. She was also a superdelegate to the Democratic National Convention in 2008, where she supported Barack Obama over Hillary Clinton.

== Personal life ==
Blackshere had two sons. She died in 2019 of complications of Parkinson's disease.
