= 1976 Democratic Party vice presidential candidate selection =

1976 Democratic vice presidential nomination
← 1972	July 15, 1976	1984 →
Nominee	Walter Mondale
Home state	Minnesota
Previous Vice Presidential nominee
Sargent Shriver
Vice Presidential nominee
Walter Mondale

This article lists those who were potential candidates for the Democratic nomination for vice president of the United States in the 1976 election. Former Georgia Governor Jimmy Carter won the 1976 Democratic nomination for president of the United States, and chose Minnesota Senator Walter Mondale as his running mate. According to Joel Goldstein, a legal professor and the author of several works on the vice presidency, 1976 marked the beginning of the modern vice presidential selection process, with candidates undergoing extensive vetting. Carter believed that his running mate might be a valuable asset to his presidential campaign, and Mondale became a significant element. The choice of Mondale helped Carter, a Southern "outsider" with little experience in Washington, rally the Democratic base to his candidacy. The Carter–Mondale ticket would go on to defeat the Ford–Dole ticket in the general election but ultimately lost to the Reagan–Bush ticket in 1980. Mondale went on to become the Democratic presidential nominee in 1984 but ultimately lost to incumbent President Ronald Reagan in the general election.

== Potential running mates ==
=== Finalists ===
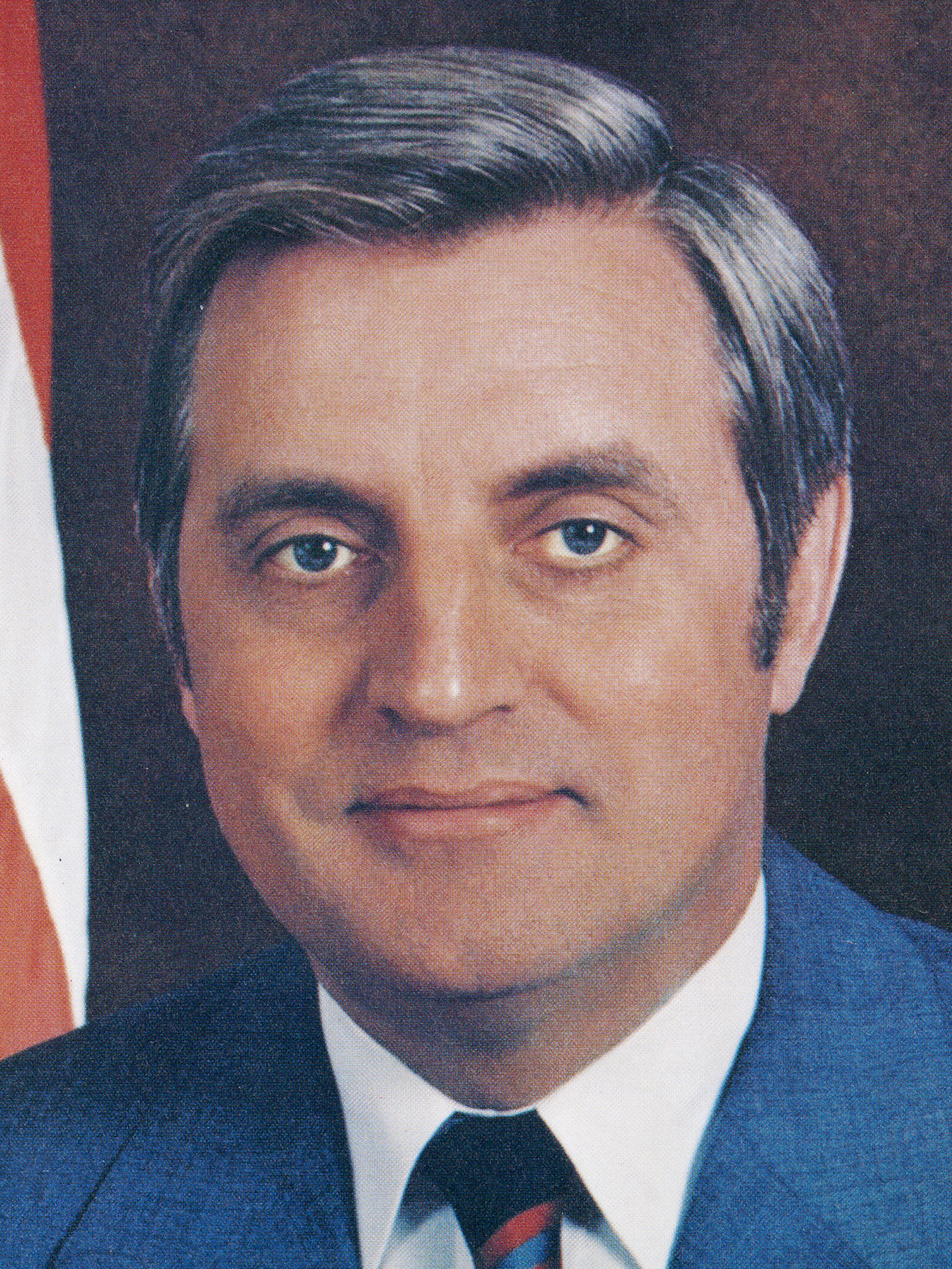
Senator
Walter Mondale
from Minnesota
(1964–1976)

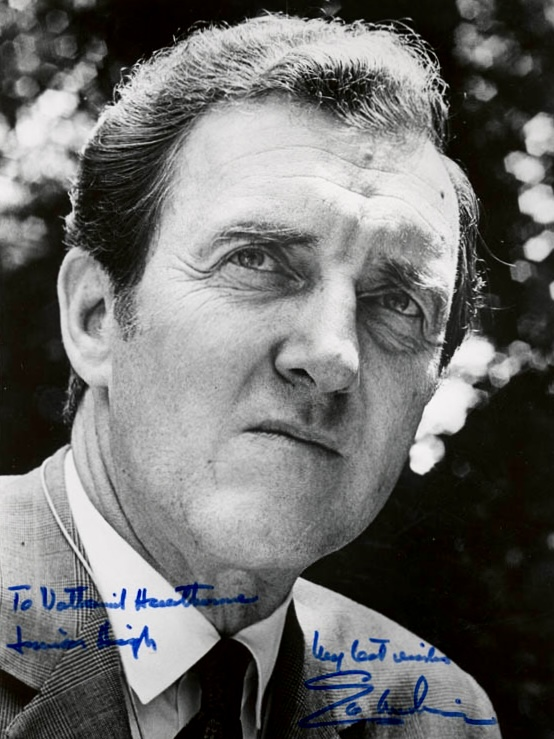
Senator and 1968 vice presidential nominee
Edmund Muskie
from Maine
(1959–1980)

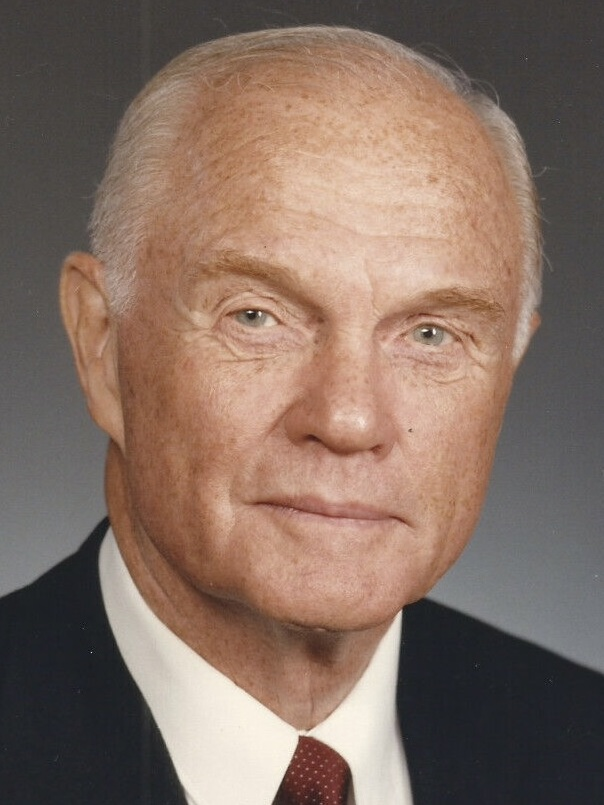
Senator
John Glenn
from Ohio
(1974–1999)

=== Others ===
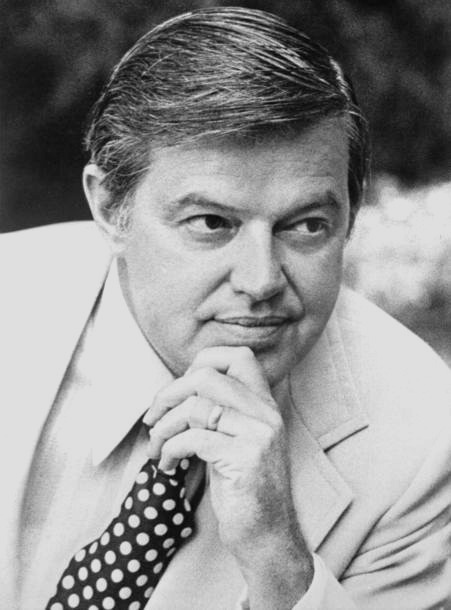
Senator and 1976 presidential candidate
Frank Church
from Idaho
(1957–1981)

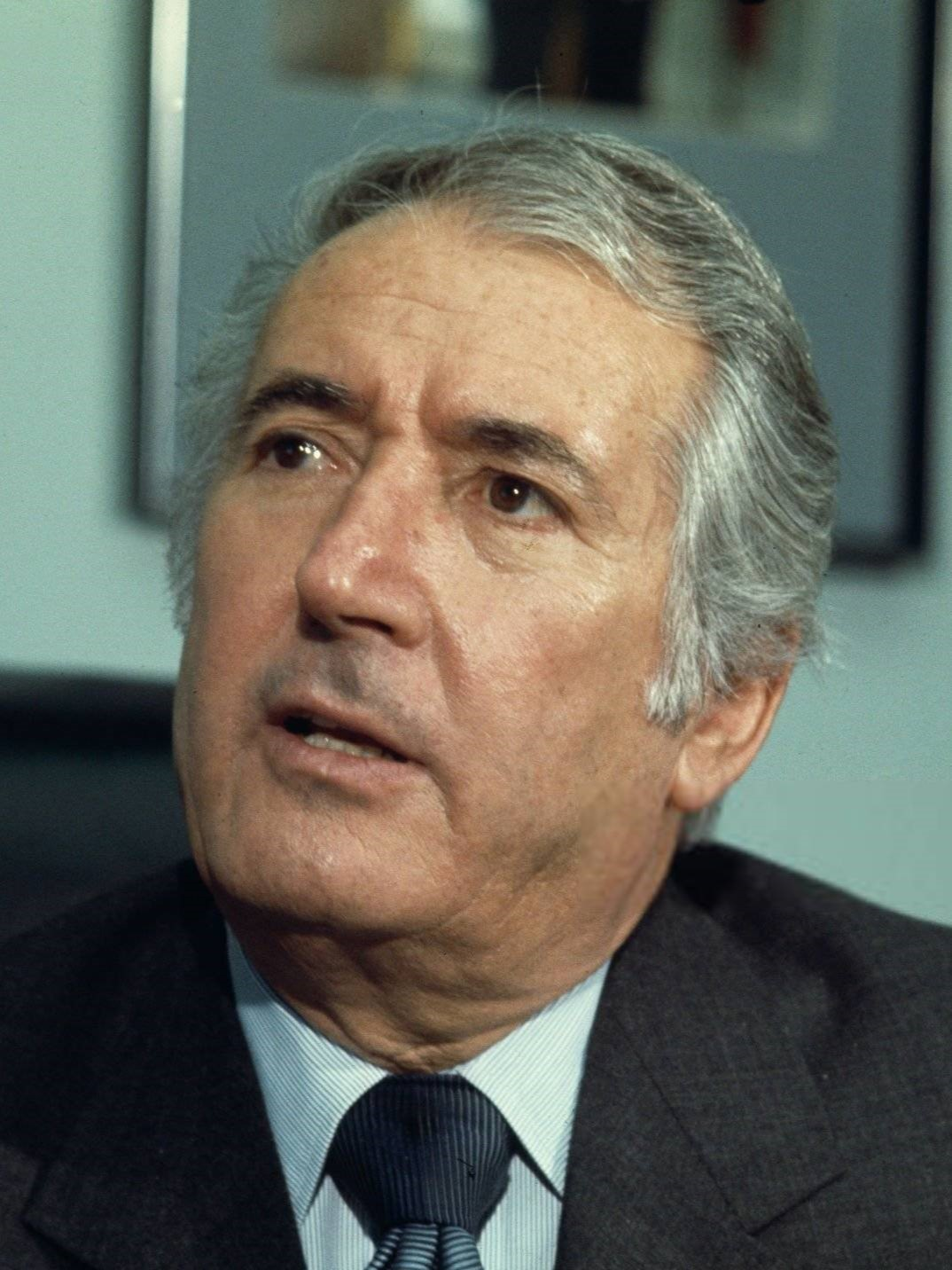
Representative
Peter W. Rodino
from New Jersey
(1949–1989)

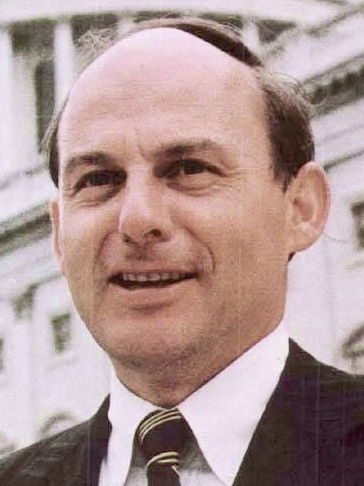
Senator
Adlai Stevenson III
from Illinois
(1970–1981)

== See also ==
- Jimmy Carter 1976 presidential campaign
- 1976 Democratic Party presidential primaries
- 1976 Democratic National Convention
- 1976 United States presidential election
- List of United States major party presidential tickets
