= 1980 John Anderson vice presidential candidate selection =

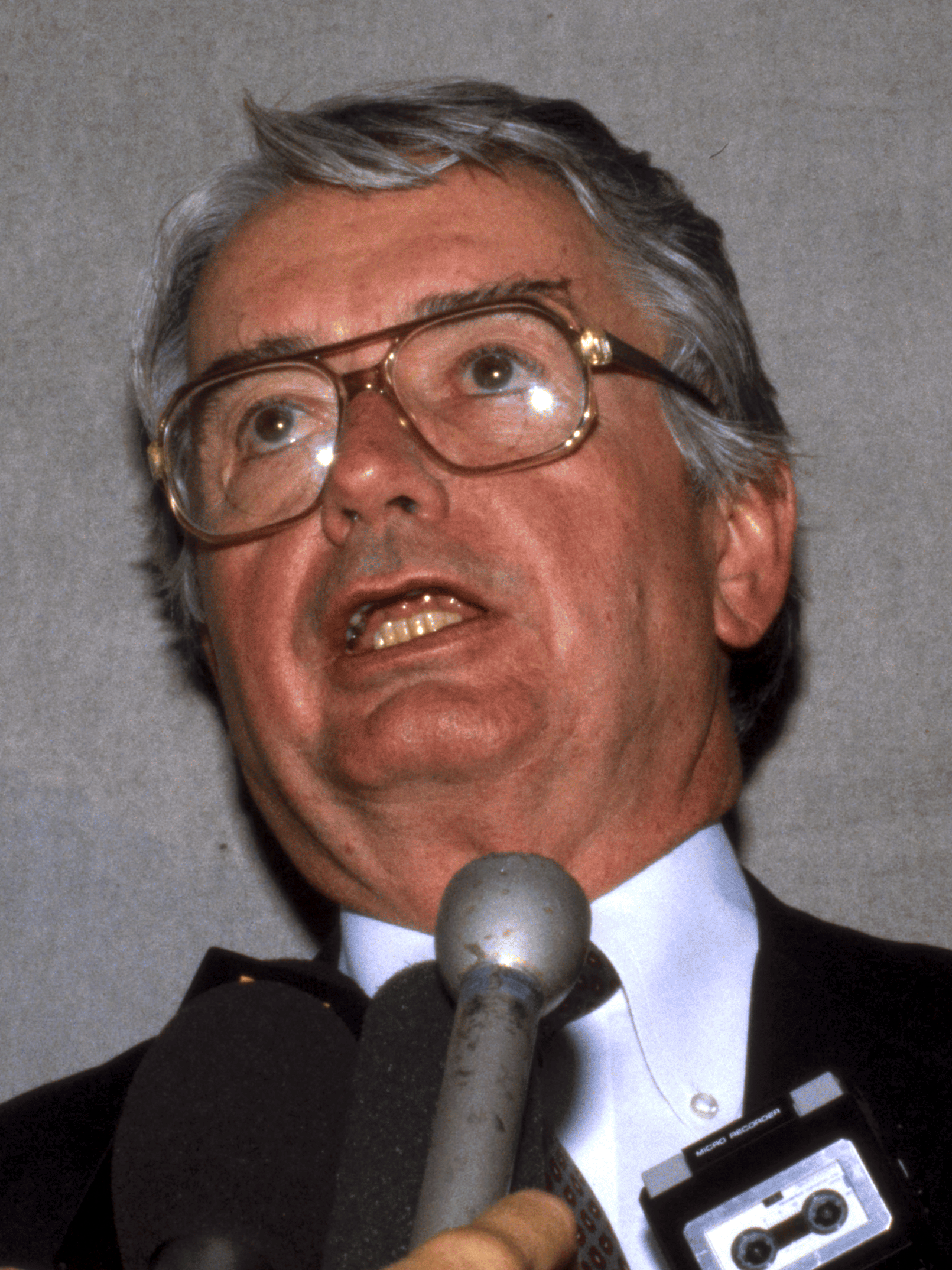
Independent candidate John B. Anderson chose former Wisconsin Governor Patrick Lucey as his running mate in 1980.

This article lists running mates considered by John B. Anderson during his 1980 independent candidacy for President of the United States. Anderson, a Republican representative from Illinois, launched an independent candidacy after dropping out of the Republican primaries. On August 26, 1980, Anderson announced his selection of former Democratic Governor Patrick Lucey of Wisconsin as his running mate. Anderson had previously stated that he wanted to choose a liberal Democrat such as Arizona Representative Mo Udall as his running mate. Anderson also seriously considered naming a black or female candidate, but ultimately went with the safer choice of Lucey. The Anderson–Lucey ticket took 6.6% of the popular vote in the 1980 presidential election.

== Other potential candidates ==
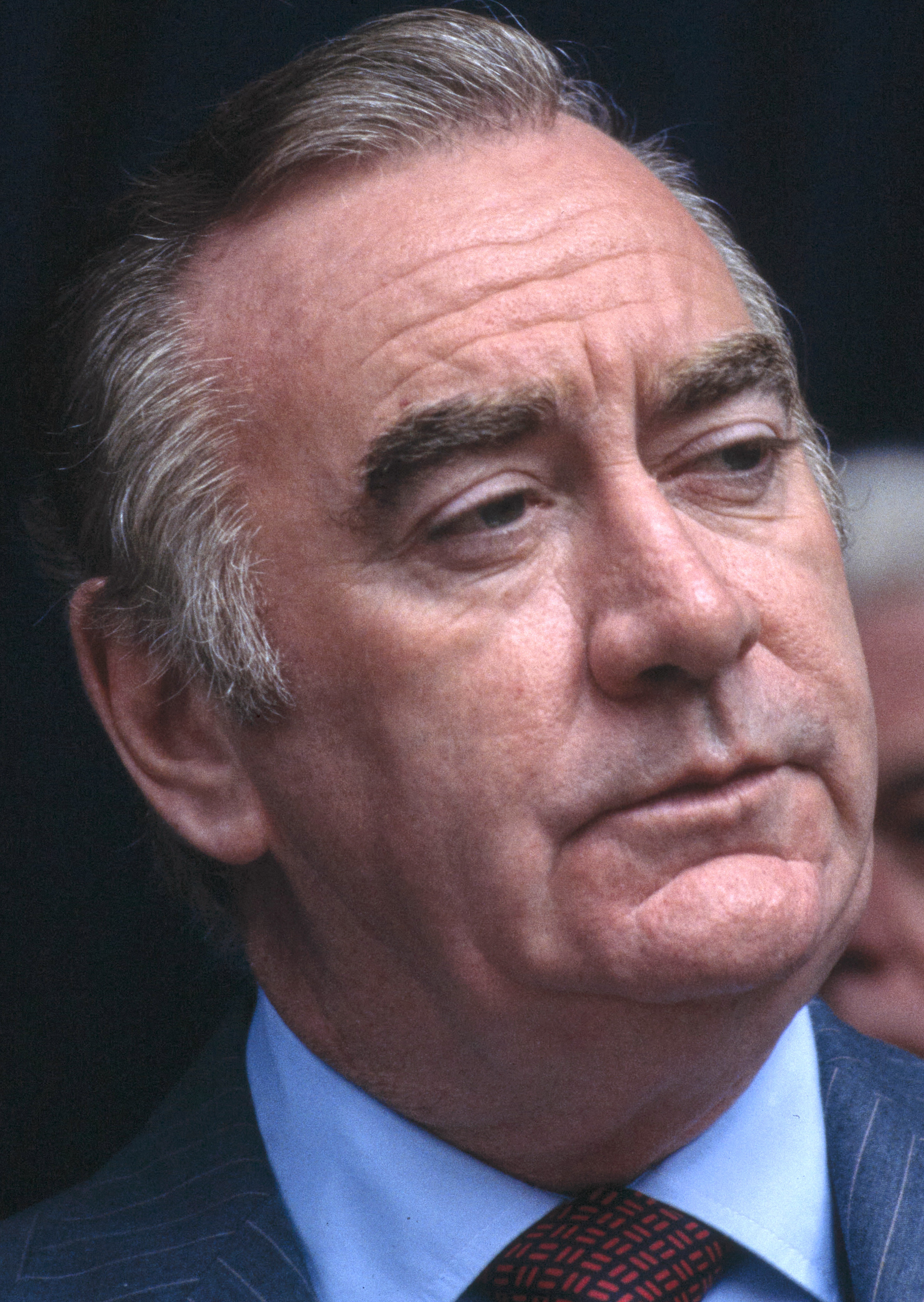
Governor
Hugh Carey
of New York
(1975–1982)

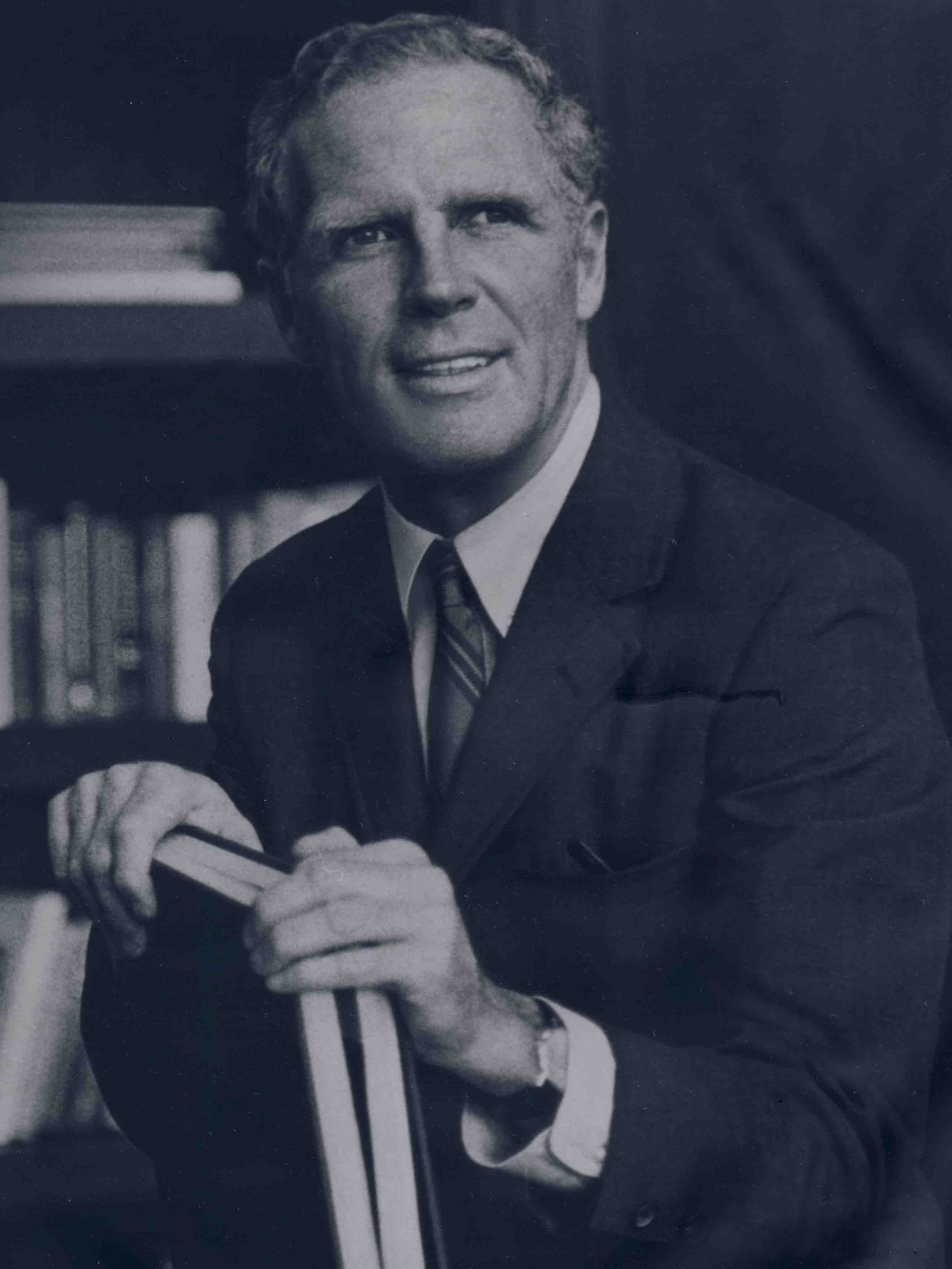
Mayor
Kevin White
from Massachusetts
(1968–1984)

Former Representative
Barbara Jordan
from Texas
(1973–1979)

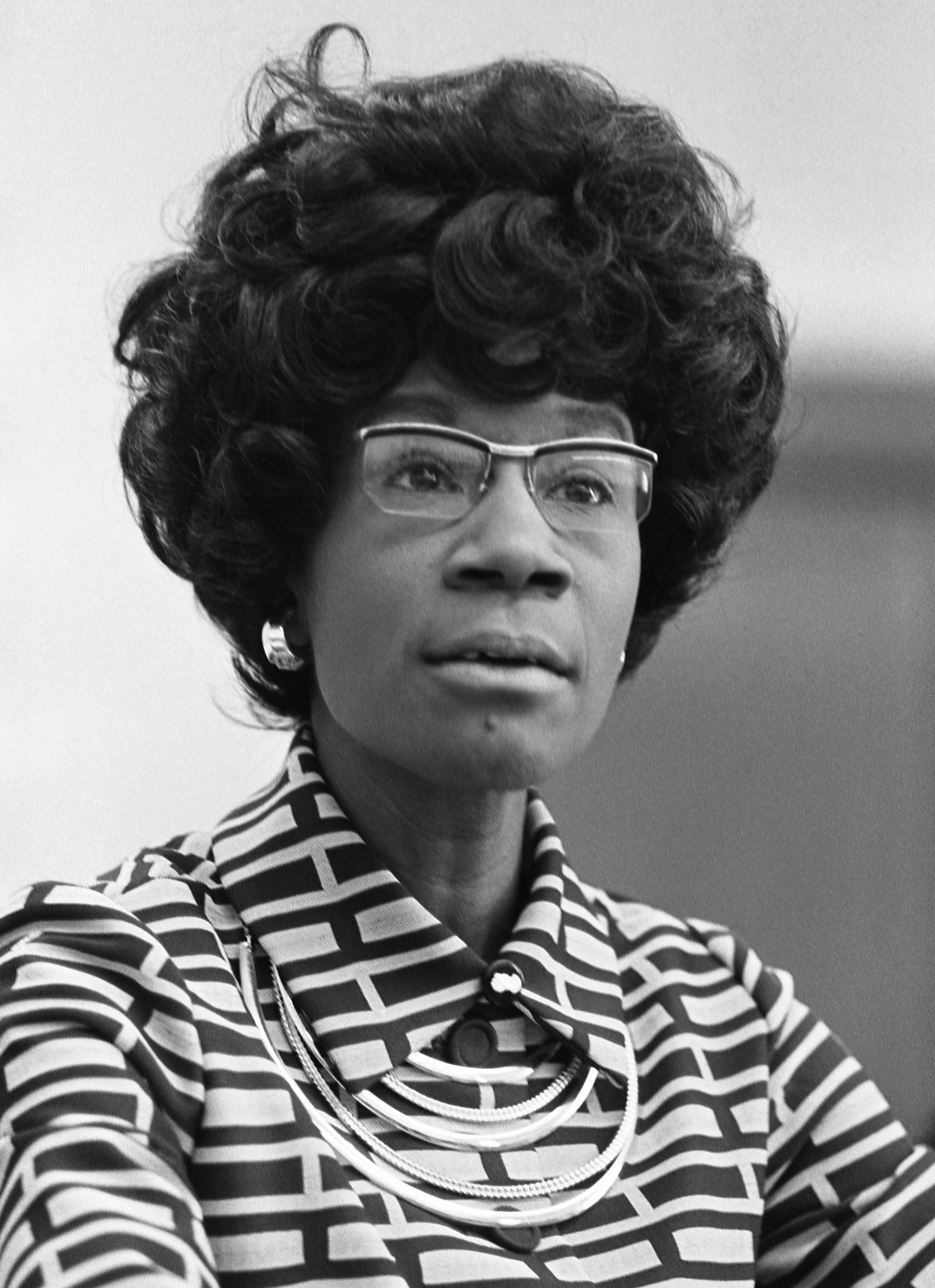
Representative
Shirley Chisholm
from New York
(1969–1983)

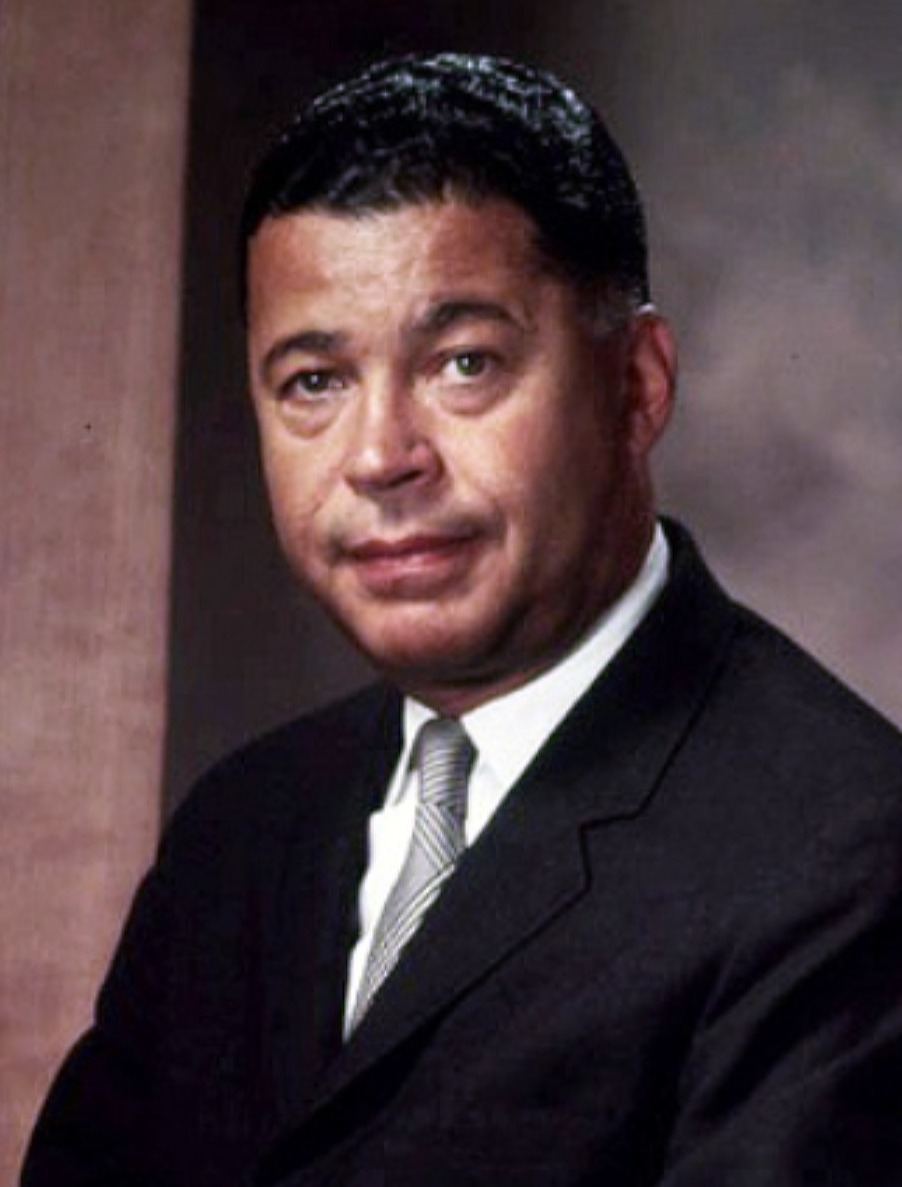
Former Senator
Edward Brooke
from Massachusetts
(1967–1979)

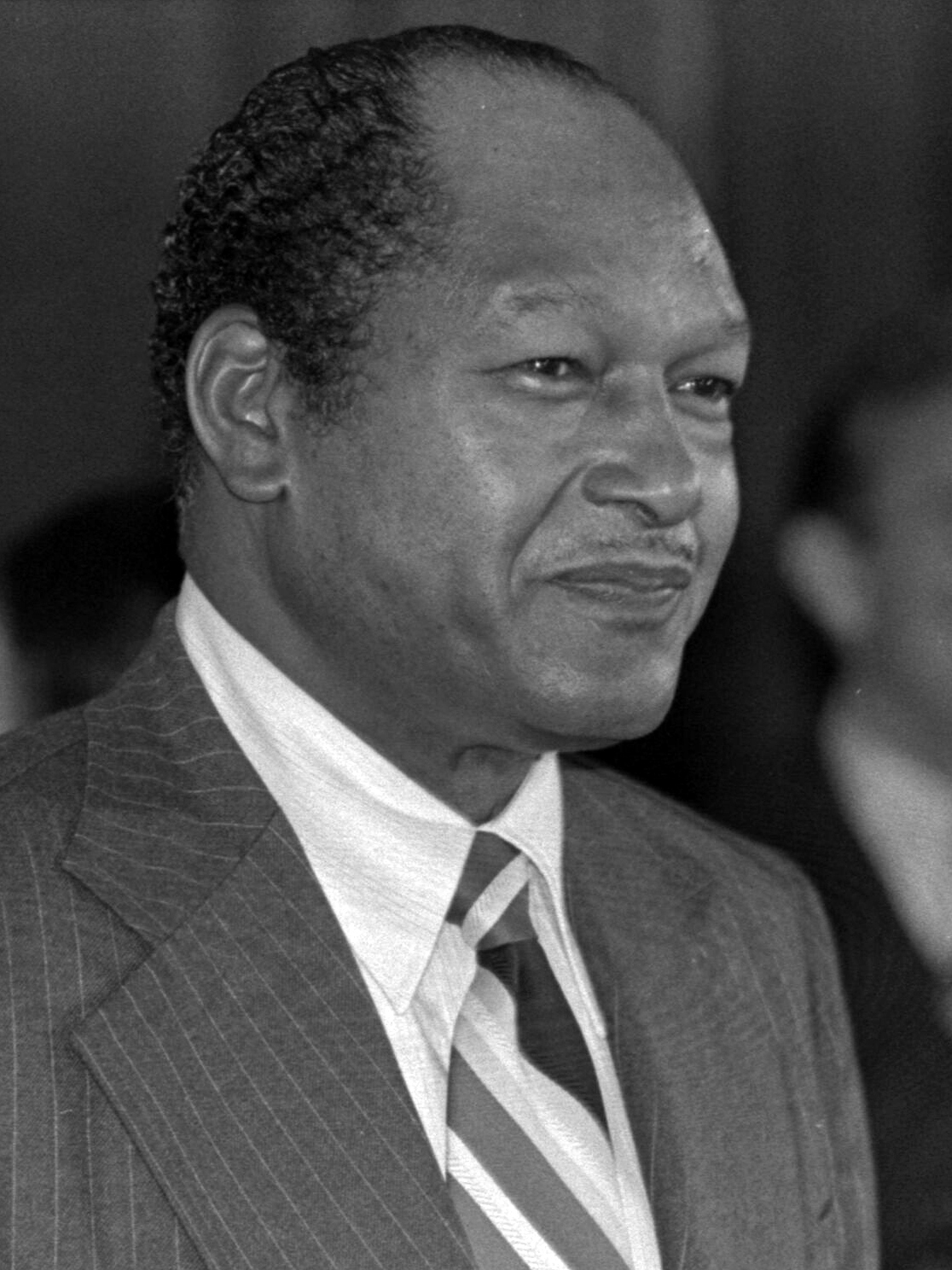
Mayor
Tom Bradley
from California
(1973–1993)

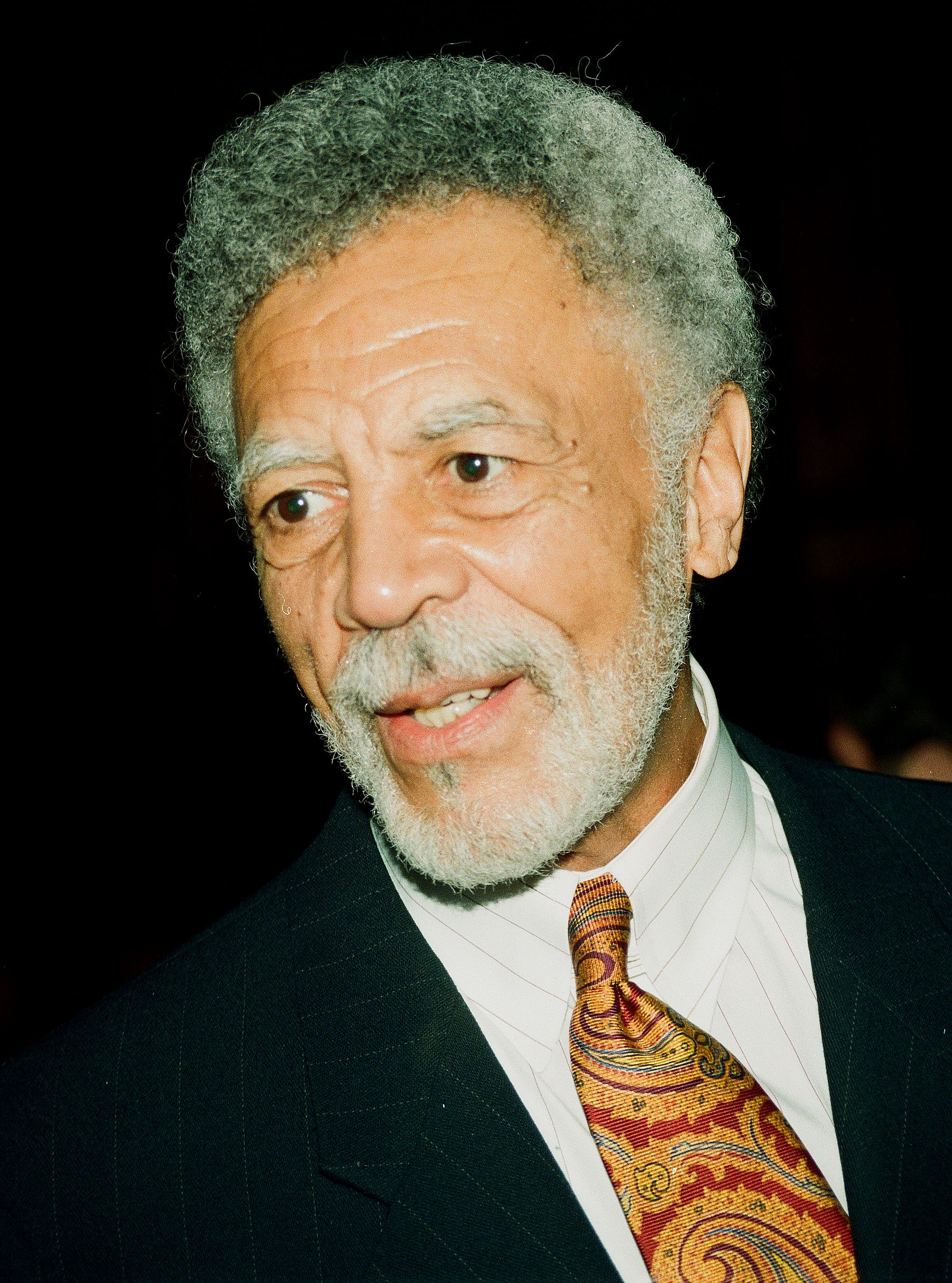
Representative
Ron Dellums
from California
(1971–1998)

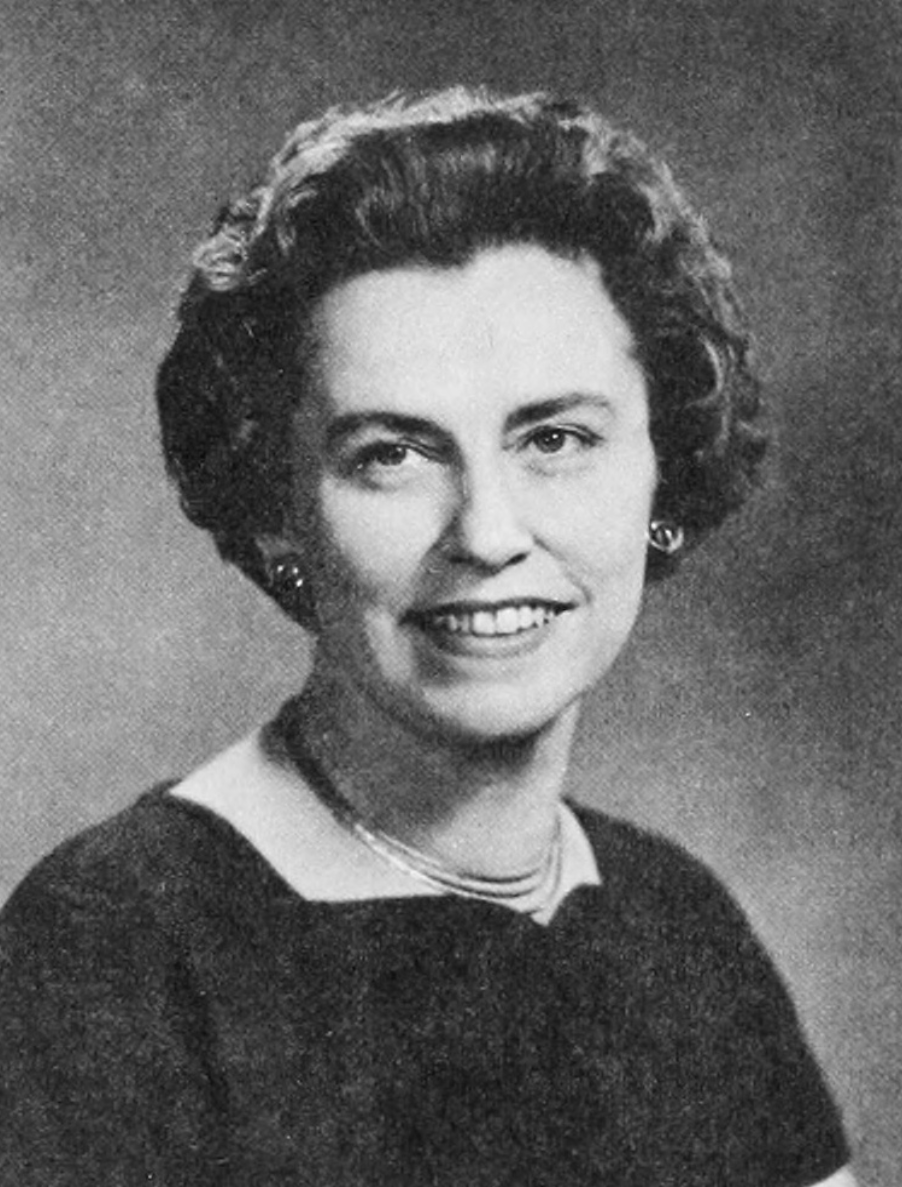
Former Representative
Martha Griffiths
from Michigan
(1955–1974)

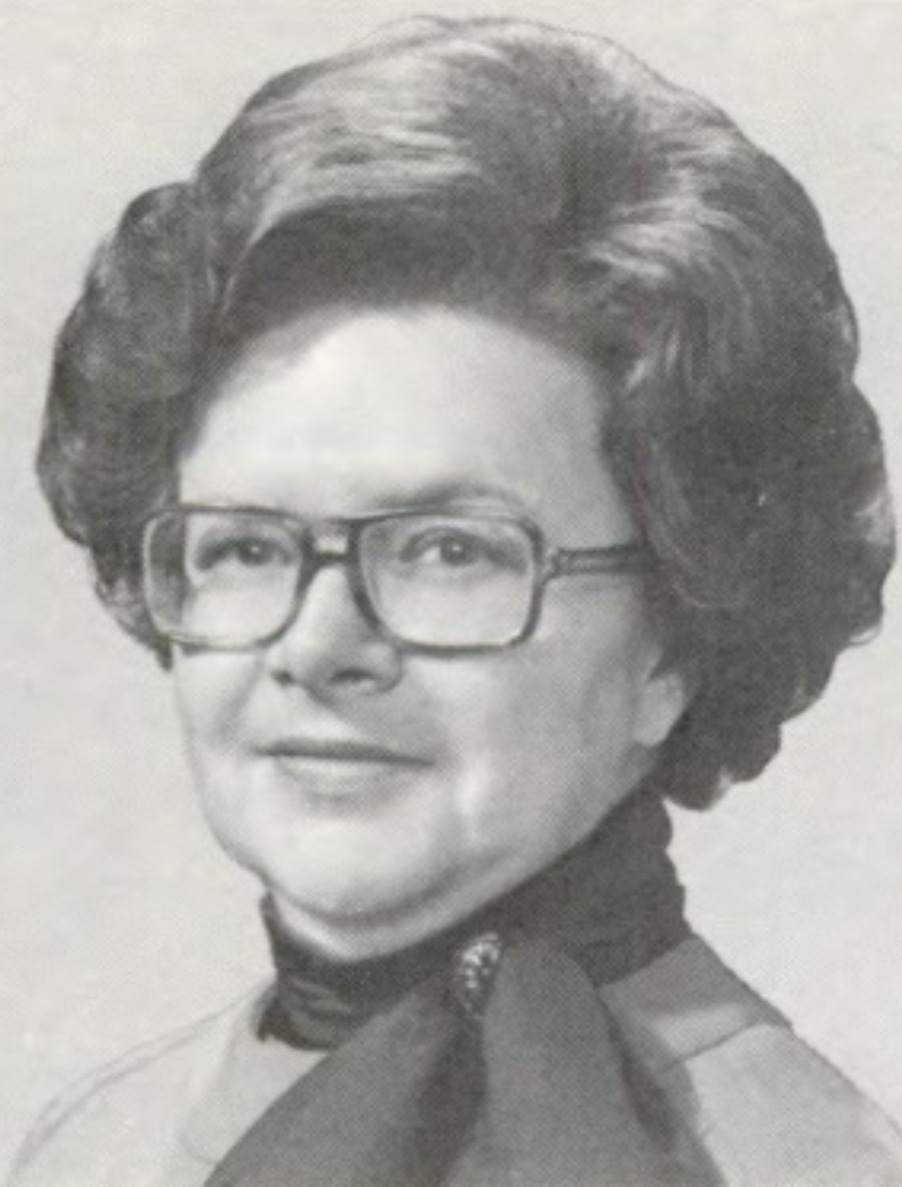
Representative
Barbara Mikulski
from Maryland
(1977–1987)

== See also ==
- 1980 United States presidential election
- John Anderson presidential campaign, 1980
