= Kevin White (politician) =

American politician (1929–2012)

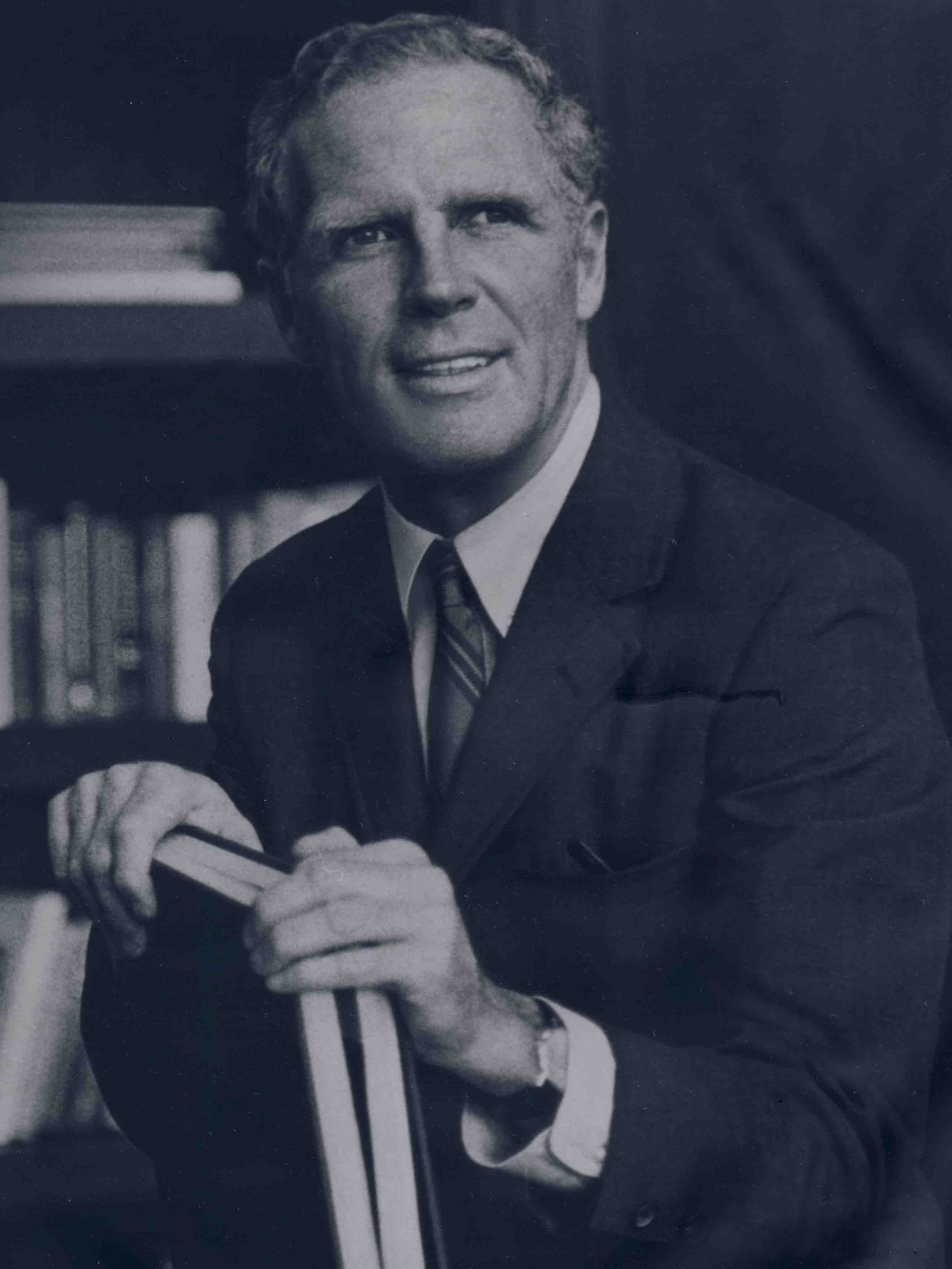
- White circa 1975

Mayor of Boston
- In office January 1, 1968 – January 2, 1984
- Preceded by: John F. Collins
- Succeeded by: Raymond Flynn

23rd Secretary of the Commonwealth of Massachusetts
- In office January 5, 1961 – December 20, 1967
- Governor: John Volpe; Endicott Peabody; John Volpe
- Preceded by: Joseph D. Ward
- Succeeded by: John Davoren

Personal details
- Born: Kevin Hagan White; September 25, 1929 Boston, Massachusetts, U.S.
- Died: January 27, 2012 (aged 82) Boston, Massachusetts, U.S.
- Party: Democratic
- Spouse: Kathryn Galvin (m. 1956)
- Parent: Joseph C. White (father)
- Relatives: Henry E. Hagan (grandfather); William J. Galvin (father-in-law)
- Education: Williams College (AB); Boston College (LLB); Harvard University

Kevin Hagan White (September 25, 1929 – January 27, 2012) was an American politician best known for serving as the mayor of Boston for four terms from 1968 to 1984. He was first elected to the office at the age of 38. He presided as mayor during racially turbulent years in the late 1960s and 1970s, and the start of desegregation of schools via court-ordered busing of school children in Boston. White won the mayoral office in the 1967 general election in a hard-fought campaign opposing the anti-busing and anti-desegregation Boston School Committee member Louise Day Hicks. Earlier he had been elected Massachusetts Secretary of the Commonwealth in 1960 at the age of 31, and he resigned from that office after his election as Mayor.

White was credited with revitalizing the waterfront, downtown and financial districts of Boston, and transforming Quincy Market into a metropolitan and tourist destination. In his first term, he implemented local neighborhood "Little City Halls" but ended them after narrowly winning the 1975 election during the Boston school desegregation busing crisis and subsequently constructed a classic and centralized city political machine. He was unsuccessful in his efforts to obtain higher office (Governor of Massachusetts and Vice President of the United States).

His mayoral administration was subject to decades-long federal investigations into corruption, which led to the conviction of more than 20 city hall employees and nearly as many businessmen; the investigations were influential in leading White to decline to seek reelection in 1983, allowing him to avoid public debate and criticism by other mayoral candidates on the topic. He himself was never indicted for wrongdoing.

== Family and education ==
Kevin H. White was born to Joseph and Patricia Hagan White in the Jamaica Plain neighborhood of Boston on September 25, 1929. Both White's father, Joseph and White's maternal grandfather, Henry E. Hagan, served as Boston City Council president. Joseph C. White had also been a state legislator.

Kevin White married Kathryn Galvin in 1956, the daughter of William J. Galvin, a former Boston City Council president.

White was educated at Tabor Academy, Williams College (A.B., 1952, where he was a member of the Phi Delta Theta fraternity), Boston College Law School (LL.B., 1955) and the Harvard Graduate School of Public Administration (now known as the John F. Kennedy School of Government).

== Secretary of the Commonwealth of Massachusetts ==
official State of Massachusetts portrait photograph, circa 1961

White was first elected to the open statewide office of Massachusetts secretary of the Commonwealth in 1960 at the age of 31. The incumbent secretary, Joseph D. Ward, decided to run for governor that year (and lost to John A. Volpe in the general election). White won the Democratic Party nomination at the state convention with the crucial assistance of his father and father-in-law, who called in political debts in order to obtain enough votes to win the nomination. He was nominated on the third ballot of the convention, thus becoming the Democratic candidate in the general election in November, in which he defeated a rising Republican, Edward W. Brooke (who in later years was elected U.S. Senator).

In 1962 and 1964, White was reelected to two additional two-year terms. In 1966 he was reelected to a four-year term. He served in office through 1967, resigning on December 20, 1967, after winning the Boston mayoral election that November.

== Mayor of Boston ==
White successfully ran for the open mayoral office in 1967, winning his first election with a coalition of Italian, liberal and black voters. He campaigned for rent control; one of his slogans was "When landlords raise rents, Kevin White raises hell." This was implemented in Boston in 1970, after a Massachusetts enabling law for municipalities was enacted in 1970.

White succeeded mayor John F. Collins, who stepped down after eight years that included urban renewal projects including the planning and building of Boston City Hall, thus paving the way for the future rebuilding and rehabilitation of the waterfront, financial and business districts of the city center that White later undertook.

=== Elections for Mayor ===
The Boston mayoral election of 1967 had a primary and a general election. In a ten-candidate non-party primary election for the open office on September 26, 1967, White was second, drawing 19.83% of the vote with 30,789 votes, and Boston School Board member Louise Day Hicks was first, with 28.16% of the vote and 43,722 votes. For the general election on November 7, 1967, only White and Hicks were on the ballot in a runoff contest. White narrowly defeated Hicks, who had taken a staunchly anti-busing (de facto anti-desegregation) position as a member of the Boston School Committee. Her slogan was the coded "You know where I stand."

Hicks's campaign against more progressive fellow Democrat Kevin White was so acrimonious that the Boston Globe, under the editorship of Thomas Winship, broke a 75-year tradition of political neutrality to endorse White.

White won the general election with 53.25 percent of the vote, (102,706, only 12,552 more than Hicks' 90,154). Two years later, in 1969, Hicks was elected to the Boston City Council by large majorities, and then in 1970 to Congress, winning the open district formerly held by retiring U.S. House Speaker John W. McCormack after defeating Joseph Moakley by 10% in the multi-candidate Democratic primary.

In the 1971 mayoral election White won a second term, again defeating Hicks, this time by 40,000 votes. Hicks in 1972 would lose her congressional seat by two percentage points and 3,428 votes in a post-census revised district and a four-candidate general election that included a rematch with Moakley running as an Independent. Hicks was re-elected to the Boston City Council in 1973, remaining there until she retired from public office in 1981.

In the 1975 mayoral election, White barely defeated State Senator Joe Timilty, the year after the start of court-ordered school desegregation and busing. The 1979 mayoral election was also close, against the same opponent. White did not run again in the 1983 mayoral election, which was won by then-city councilor Raymond Flynn.

=== Administration ===
Mayor White's early administrations were noteworthy for the racial and ethnic diversity of the senior aides and staff to the Mayor, with many staffers subsequently going on to influential positions and elected office.

White decentralized municipal government by establishing in the early years of his tenure in office a number of "Little City Halls" in local neighborhoods, giving more influence to local leadership and ethnic and racial minorities to access city hall bureaucracy, but following the narrowly won election in 1975 against Joseph Timilty during the Boston school busing crisis, closed them, re-centralizing power in Boston City Hall and creating a political machine intentionally modeled on the one headed by Chicago Mayor Richard J. Daley, with ward lieutenants empowered to reward White supporters with city jobs and city contracts.

=== Peaceful city after death of Martin Luther King Jr. ===
In the fourth month of White's first term, on April 4, 1968, Martin Luther King Jr. was assassinated, touching off disturbances in the African-American Roxbury section of Boston that same evening which did not spread to other parts of the city. On April 5, 5,000 people marched from Boston Common to Post Office Square in King's memory. James Brown had a previously scheduled concert set for that same evening in Boston Garden. White's chief of police was concerned about allowing 15,000 people to attend the concert so close to downtown, saying he didn't think he could keep the city safe. White originally intended to cancel the concert entirely. However, Tom Atkins, a local NAACP leader who had been elected to the City Council from Roxbury in the same election as White 1967 warned of potential rioting if concertgoers arriving at the arena found it canceled. Atkins and members of White's staff persuaded White to allow the show to go on.

On such short notice, Atkins and White administrators persuaded Brown and Boston's public television station, WGBH-TV, to broadcast the concert. The White administration also appealed to community leaders to help keep the peace, and also encouraged people to stay home and watch the concert on television. White appeared on stage with James Brown to appeal to the audience, and to the entire city via television, to remember and maintain King's peaceful vision.

So all I ask you tonight is this: to let us look at each other, here in the Garden and back at home, and pledge that no matter what any other community might do, we in Boston will honor Dr. King in peace. — Kevin White from the stage of Boston Garden

WGBH immediately rebroadcast the concert twice more that night, and people apparently stayed inside to continue watching it. While many cities, including Washington DC, New York, Chicago, Detroit and Oakland, were beset with civil disturbances, rioting and fires after King's death, the city of Boston was spared from widespread disturbances.

White secured $60,000 from the Boston City Council to make up for the loss of ticket revenue to the performers resulting from his efforts to discourage attendance at the close-to-downtown arena at this volatile moment. Only 2,000 had attended the sold-out show, in a venue that had a capacity of 15,000. Individuals with Brown's entourage state that only $10,000 made it to Brown's production company.

=== History of non-leadership by city elites on civil rights ===
Barney Frank, who worked as White's chief of staff in City Hall during his first mayoral term, has described White's being dubbed "Mayor Black", because he was the first Boston mayor to admit there was a racial-discrimination problem. White administration staff member, and subsequent Boston City Council President, Bruce Bolling, describes a leadership vacuum on the issue of race, and that for many years "the established institutions—the City Council, the School Committee, the mayor, the business community, the philanthropic community, the religious community—no one weighed in in any responsible way to address this issue of school desegregation."

I don’t know where he [Kevin White] was when we were having the people in South Boston and East Boston and other places who were railing out against the desegregation order. I think it's important for people to understand that the leadership in the white community was very scarce around this issue. — Mel King

This elite leadership vacuum would leave Mayor White without the public community leadership and visible alliances and collaboration desirable to peacefully implement new policies necessary to comply with a later court order to desegregate the schools. The Boston School Committee was independently elected, and not under the control of Mayor White, and had put into place de jure segregation and discrimination policies in the operation and funding of schools in Boston, and this was a source of great frustration to Mayor White.

The city administration did not move on the issue of unfair treatment of minorities in the school system, and compliance with anti-segregation laws and decisions, until the a federal court required the city to do so, via a court order.

=== School desegregation crisis ===
The state of Massachusetts had enacted in 1965 the "Racial Imbalance Act", the first of its kind in the United States. The law required school districts to desegregate, otherwise state funding for education would be withheld from the school district. The law was opposed by many in Boston, including the Boston School Committee, as well as many especially in working-class districts in Irish-American-majority South Boston.

On April 1, 1965, a special committee appointed by Massachusetts Education Commissioner Owen Kiernan released its final report finding that more than half of black students enrolled in Boston Public Schools (BPS) attended institutions with enrollments that were at least 80 percent black and that housing segregation in the city had caused the racial imbalance. From its creation under the National Housing Act of 1934 signed into law by President Franklin D. Roosevelt, the Federal Housing Administration used its official mortgage insurance underwriting policy explicitly to prevent school integration. The Boston Housing Authority actively segregated the city's public housing developments since at least 1941 and continued to do so despite the passage of legislation by the 156th Massachusetts General Court prohibiting racial discrimination or segregation in housing in 1950 and the issuance of Executive Order 11063 by President John F. Kennedy in 1962 that required all federal agencies to prevent racial discrimination in federally-funded subsidized housing in the United States.

In response to the report, on April 20, 1965, the Boston NAACP filed a lawsuit in federal district court against the city seeking the desegregation of the city's public schools. Massachusetts Governor John Volpe (1961–1963 & 1965–1969) filed a request for legislation from the state legislature that defined schools with nonwhite enrollments greater than 50 percent to be imbalanced and granted the State Board of Education the power to withhold state funds from any school district in the state that was found to have racial imbalance, which Volpe would sign into law the following August. Pursuant to the Racial Imbalance Act, the state conducted a racial census and found 55 imbalanced schools in the state with 46 in Boston, and in October 1965, the State Board required the School Committee to submit a desegregation plan, which the School Committee did the following December.

In April 1966, the State Board found the School Committee's plan to desegregate the Boston Public Schools in accordance with the law inadequate and voted to rescind state aid to the district, and in response, the School Committee filed a lawsuit against the State Board challenging both the decision and the constitutionality of the Racial Imbalance Act the following August. In January 1967, the Massachusetts Superior Court overturned a Suffolk Superior Court ruling that the State Board had improperly withdrawn the funds and ordered the School Committee to submit an acceptable plan to the State Board within 90 days or else permanently lose funding, which the School Committee did shortly thereafter and the State Board accepted. In June 1967, the Massachusetts Supreme Judicial Court upheld the constitutionality of the Racial Imbalance Act and the U.S. Supreme Court under Chief Justice Earl Warren (1953–1969) declined to hear the School Committee's appeal in January 1968. On May 25, 1971, the Massachusetts State Board of Education voted unanimously to withhold state aid from the Boston Public Schools due to the School Committee's refusal to use the district's open enrollment policy to relieve the city's racial imbalance in enrollments, instead routinely granting white students transfers while doing nothing to assist black students attempting to transfer.

On March 15, 1972, the Boston NAACP filed a lawsuit, later named Morgan v. Hennigan, against the Boston School Committee in federal district court. After being randomly assigned to the case, on June 21, 1974, Judge W. Arthur Garrity Jr. ruled that the open enrollment and controlled transfer policies that the School Committee created in 1961 and 1971 respectively were being used to effectively discriminate on the basis of race, and that the School Committee had maintained segregation in the Boston Public Schools by adding portable classrooms to overcrowded white schools instead of assigning white students to nearby underutilized black schools, while simultaneously purchasing closed white schools and busing black students past open white schools with vacant seats. In accordance with the Racial Imbalance Act, the School Committee would be required to bus 17,000 to 18,000 students the following September (Phase I) and to formulate a desegregation plan for the 1975–1976 school year by December 16 (Phase II).

On September 12, 1974, 79 of 80 schools were bused without incident (with South Boston High School being the lone exception). Twenty minutes after Judge Garrity's deadline for submitting the Phase II plan expired on December 16, 1974, the School Committee voted to reject the desegregation plan proposed by the department's Educational Planning Center. On December 18, Garrity summoned all five Boston School Committee members to court, held three of the members to be in contempt of court on December 27, and told the members on December 30 that he would purge their contempt holdings if they voted to authorize submission of a Phase II plan by January 7. On January 7, 1975, the School Committee directed school department planners to file a voluntary-only busing proposal with the court.

On May 10, 1975, the Massachusetts U.S. District Court announced a Phase II plan requiring 24,000 students to be bused that was formulated by a four-member committee consisting of former Massachusetts Supreme Judicial Court Justice Jacob Spiegel, former U.S. Education Commissioner Francis Keppel, Harvard Graduate School of Education professor Charles V. Willie, and former Massachusetts Attorney General Edward J. McCormack that was formed by Judge Garrity the previous February. On June 14, the U.S. Supreme Court under Chief Justice Warren E. Burger (1969–1986) unanimously declined to review the School Committee's appeal of the Phase II plan. In December 1975, Judge Garrity ordered South Boston High School put under federal receivership. In December 1982, Judge Garrity transferred responsibility for monitoring of compliance to the State Board for the subsequent two years, and in September 1985, Judge Garrity issued his final orders returning jurisdiction of the schools to the School Committee. In May 1990, Judge Garrity delivered his final judgment in Morgan v. Hennigan, formally closing the original case. From September 1974 through the fall of 1976, at least 40 riots occurred in the city (including many interracial riots), and incidents of interracial violence in Boston would continue from November 1977 through at least 1993.

On June 21, 1974, Judge W. Arthur Garrity issued a decision in Morgan v. Hennigan that found that the Boston School Committee had followed an intentional policy of segregating the city's public schools by race, including building new schools and school annexes in overcrowded white-majority districts, instead of making use of empty seats and classrooms in districts with large minority populations. As a remedy, Garrity ordered the city's schools desegregated, leading to a system of desegregation busing.

In Phase I of the plan, Judge Garrity followed a busing plan previously drawn up by Charles Glenn, the director of the Bureau of Equal Educational Opportunity within the Massachusetts Board of Education, that required schools with a population greater than 50% white to be balanced by other races; the initial Phase I plan included only 80 schools, amounting to 40 percent of the Boston Public School system. The Glenn plan had been originally constructed in response to an earlier Massachusetts state lawsuit between the Massachusetts Board of Education and the Boston School Committee. In that earlier lawsuit, the Boston School Committee had sued the Massachusetts Board of Education for the Board's withholding state funds for the committee's refusal to conform to the requirements of the Massachusetts Racial Imbalance Act. Ultimately, among the Boston districts most affected were West Roxbury, Roslindale, Hyde Park, the North End, Charlestown, South Boston and Dorchester.

The desegregation plan in general, and busing in particular, was met with an onslaught of protest. The integration plan provoked fierce criticism and led to months of racially motivated violence, with attacks at City Hall and South Boston and other city high schools, with dozens injured. In some white neighborhoods, protesters threw stones at arriving school buses arriving with black children from other parts of the city. White directed that police escort buses, and also coordinated with state officials to bring in several hundred state police to keep order. On October 15, 1974, the Massachusetts National Guard was deployed by Republican Governor Frank Sargent to Boston to keep order in schools.

One famous incident in 1976 was documented in a news photograph entitled The Soiling of Old Glory. During one demonstration outside Boston City Hall, black lawyer and businessman Ted Landsmark was attacked with an American flag by a white teenager.

=== Rolling Stones ===
In 1972, White made news when the Rhode Island State Police arrested members of The Rolling Stones immediately prior to a concert appearance in the Boston Garden. That evening, a riot was underway in the South End and White needed to move police officers from the Garden to address the disturbance. Fearing unrest among the 15,000 concertgoers if the Stones were not permitted to perform, White persuaded the Rhode Island authorities to release the band members into his personal custody, enabling them to make their scheduled concert appearance in Boston. He then appeared on stage before the waiting fans to urge them to keep the peace. White's actions won him favor among young first-time voters and parents of teens in his re-election.

A statue outside Boston's Faneuil Hall honors four-term Boston mayor Kevin White.

=== Boston downtown revitalization ===
White worked for the revitalization of Boston's downtown districts, opening the waterfront to public access, and presiding over a downtown financial district building boom. His administration was instrumental in the renovation and renewal of Quincy Market which reopened in 1976, transforming an eyesore and run-down series of warehouses and open stalls into a "festival marketplace" that was subsequently copied by other cities.

White's selection of Araldo Cossutta as architect for the Boston Marriott Long Wharf was a source of controversy. He overruled the seven other recommendations of the Boston Redevelopment Authority (BRA), even though each was rated more highly. It is believed White's choice was a favor to his friend Mortimer B. Zuckerman, the project's financier. The executive director of the BRA resigned after the decision.

=== Urban renewal and redlining ===
In 1963, Boston Mayor John F. Collins (1960–1968) and Boston Redevelopment Authority executive Edward J. Logue organized a consortium of savings banks, cooperatives, and federal and state savings and loan associations in the city called the Boston Banks Urban Renewal Group (B-BURG) that would provide $2.5 million in Federal Housing Administration (FHA) insured rehabilitation and home-ownership loans at less than 5.25% interest in Washington Park around Dudley Square in Roxbury. In 1968, B-BURG consisted of 22 institutions that collectively held $4 billion in assets or 90 percent of the region's thrift industry. On April 11, 1968, President Lyndon B. Johnson signed into law the Civil Rights Act of 1968 including Titles VIII and IX introduced by Massachusetts U.S. Senator Edward Brooke prohibiting discrimination in the sale or rental of housing. On May 13, 1968, White announced a $50 million loan commitment program with B-BURG. On July 31, B-BURG opened a headquarters on Warren Street near Dudley Square. In July and August, B-BURG executives held meetings to define the geographic scope of a $29 million loan program within a Model Cities area, with Suffolk Franklin Vice President Carl Ericson proposing areas of Mattapan and Roxbury along Blue Hill Avenue.

Over the summer and fall of 1968, real estate advertising by mail and telephone using blockbusting tactics began to be circulated in Mattapan. According to a Model Cities study, 65 percent of the houses purchased under the B-BURG program from 1968 to 1970 needed major repairs at the time of purchase, and a later 1971 survey found that 65 percent of the houses sold under the B-BURG program needed major repairs within two years of purchase, and Joseph Kenealy, head appraiser for the FHA in Boston, received a lawsuit in 1971 from the U.S. Justice Department alleging that he used the office to enrich himself and family members by $350,000. By March 31, 1970, more than 1,300 minority families bought homes with B-BURG mortgages with the vast majority being steered into the Jewish neighborhoods of Mattapan (where the black population increased from 473 in 1960 to 19,107 in 1970), while approximately 15,000 people in total found new residences during the first 20 months of the program. With the first immigrants arriving in the 1920s, Dorchester, Roxbury, and Mattapan would become home to a population of as many as 90,000 Jews. By 1957, 40,000 Jews remained in Dorchester alone with an additional 10,000 Jews in Mattapan, but within the two years from 1968 to 1970, more than five decades of Jewish settlement in all three neighborhoods would be overturned by its inclusion in the B-BURG loan area by Suffolk Franklin Vice President Carl Ericson.

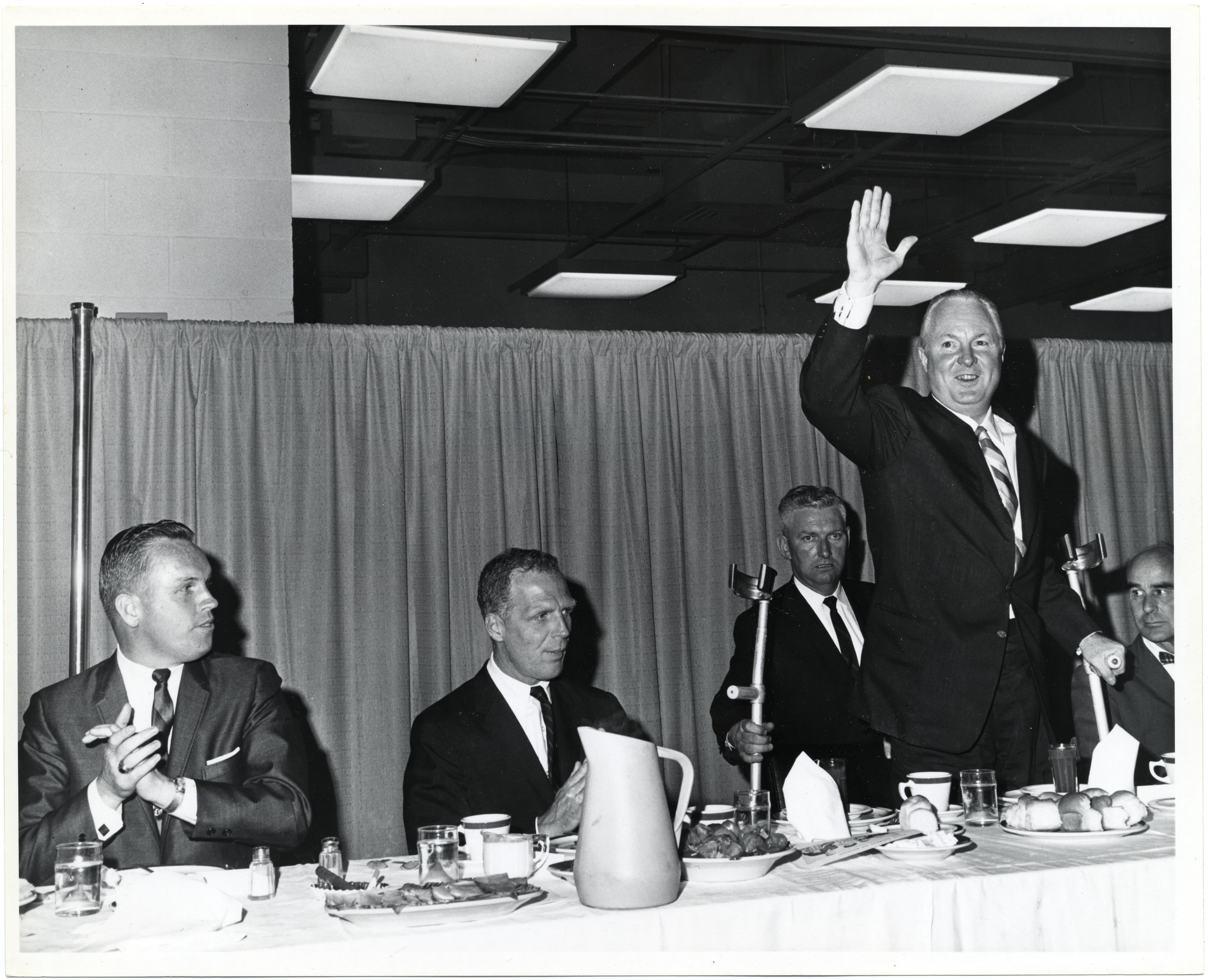
White with predecessor as Mayor of Boston John F. Collins (1960–1968). White would succeed Collins following the 1967 mayoral election.

In March 1969, Boston City Councilor Thomas Atkins met with Robert Morgan, President of the Boston Five Cents Savings Bank (a B-BURG member institution), about the B-BURG loan area. From its creation under the National Housing Act of 1934 signed into law by President Franklin D. Roosevelt, official FHA property appraisal underwriting standards to qualify for mortgage insurance had a whites-only requirement excluding all racially mixed neighborhoods or white neighborhoods in proximity to black neighborhoods, and this produced a self-fulfilling effect on property values within redlined areas. However, instead of denying mortgages to minority homebuyers in white neighborhoods, B-BURG would only approve mortgages within specific neighborhoods of Roxbury and Mattapan causing an artificial restriction to the housing supply available for loanable funds to minorities and increasing the interest rates of the B-BURG loan pool from a range of 4.5 to 5.0% up to 8.5%. Within blockbusted neighborhoods, many minority homebuyers ended up in default as a consequence of making mortgage payments far in excess of a property's worth, and in 1968, the FHA announced that it would begin guaranteeing loans in the inner city, reducing a market disincentive against lending in blockbusted neighborhoods.

From September 13 through September 16, 1971, the U.S. Senate Judiciary Antitrust and Monopoly Subcommittee chaired by Michigan U.S. Senator Philip Hart held hearings at the John F. Kennedy Federal Building in Boston that established the creation and location of the B-BURG loan area following a written statement from Boston Redevelopment Authority executive Hale Champion and testimony from B-BURG member institution executives and a BRA executive staff member. On the final day of the hearings, a statement received from White's office praised the B-BURG institutions for their rehabilitation and home ownership expansion efforts, but established that White's office was not involved in the drawing of the loan area. From July 1977 through June 1978, 91 percent of the government-insured foreclosures in Boston were in Dorchester, Mattapan, and Roxbury, with 53 percent of the city's foreclosures in South Dorchester and Mattapan alone, and 84 percent of the 93 foreclosures in Dorchester were concentrated in the B-BURG program census tracts. Despite the passage of the Community Reinvestment Act signed into law by President Jimmy Carter in 1977 banning redlining, the legislation was not seriously enforced by the U.S. Department of Housing and Urban Development (HUD) in the 1980s during the Reagan Administration while the department itself was embroiled in corruption scandals. By the early 1990s, the overwhelming majority of Boston's 120,000 black residents lived in Dorchester, Roxbury, and Mattapan.

=== Corruption investigations ===
Prior to White's final term in office, Suffolk County and federal prosecutors were investigating a few mid-level city officials. It became known in March 1981 that city employees had been asked to donate to a birthday celebration in honor of the mayor's wife; the requested donations were not political, but personal gifts, and had amounted to $122,000 by the time White cancelled the event after public outrage official inquiries were conducted. In July 1981, President Ronald Reagan appointed William F. Weld as US District Attorney for Massachusetts. Weld expanded the previously ongoing investigative probes, further examining the White administration and the Whites' personal finances. The resulting indictments, guilty pleas, and convictions were subsequently one of Weld's credentials when campaigning for governor in 1990. Weld's office issued charges of fraudulent disability pensions, bribery, extortion, and perjury that were the downfall of more than 20 city employees, including a number of key individuals in White's political machine, and nearly as many businessmen.

The United States Department of Housing and Urban Development in 1982 also released a report stating that the city had misappropriated $1.9 million worth of community grants. Federal auditors accused the White administration of improperly using the funds to pay the salaries of city employees that were not working on federally funded projects.

== Other political campaigns ==
In his 1970 campaign for governor of Massachusetts, White won a hard-fought multi-candidate Democratic primary election on September 15, 1970, with only 34.33 percent of the vote and by fewer than two percentage points more than his nearest opponent, Massachusetts Senate President Maurice A. Donahue. White lost the November 3 general election against Republican Frank Sargent. White's running mate was Michael Dukakis, who challenged and defeated Sargent for the governor's office four years later in 1974. White failed to win more votes than Sargent in the city of Boston in the 1970 general election. White's campaign for governor was interrupted for several days when he underwent emergency stomach surgery for an ulcer.

In 1972, during the Democratic National Convention, White was on the verge of becoming the Democratic Party's vice-presidential nominee. After a number of better-known politicians, including Senators Ted Kennedy and Gaylord Nelson, and Governor Reubin Askew, turned down the position, White briefly became the front-runner for the post. Ted Kennedy, economist John Kenneth Galbraith and others in the Massachusetts delegation opposed White's potential nomination, because White had supported Maine Senator Edmund Muskie during the presidential primaries. Presidential nominee Senator George McGovern decided to turn elsewhere and selected Senator Thomas Eagleton, who was later embroiled in a controversy over his failure to disclose having received electric shock therapy for depression. Ultimately, the vice presidential nominee was former Peace Corps head, Chicago School Board President, and later Ambassador Sargent Shriver, who had married into the Kennedy family. McGovern commented ten years later, in 1982: "Choosing White would have been much better than what happened [with Eagleton]. We probably should have overruled" Kennedy and the others. John B. Anderson, independent candidate in the 1980 presidential election, considered asking White to be the vice presidential candidate on his ticket.

== Later life ==
After departing from the mayor's office in 1984, White served as director of the Institute for Political Communication at Boston University from 1984 to 2002, and as a professor of communications and public management.

Questions about White's political finances continued to plague him. In 1993, without admitting guilt, White agreed to return to the state nearly $25,000 in surplus campaign funds that he had used for personal expenses.

On November 1, 2006, a statue of White was unveiled at Boston's Faneuil Hall. The bronze statue, created by sculptor Pablo Eduardo, portrays White walking down the sidewalk. Behind the statue are several metal footprints along the sidewalk. With these are several quotes from White which were made during his mayoral inauguration speeches.

On January 27, 2012, White died in Boston, aged 82.

== Health ==
In 1970, during his campaign for governor, White underwent surgery that removed two-thirds of his stomach. In 2001, the since-retired White suffered a heart attack that left him with a pacemaker. In his advanced age, he lost hearing in his right ear and suffered from Alzheimer's disease.

== See also ==
- Timeline of Boston, 1960s–1980s

Party political offices
Preceded by Edward J. Cronin	Democratic nominee for Secretary of the Commonwealth of Massachusetts; 1960, 1962, 1964, 1966	Succeeded by John Davoren
Political offices
Preceded by Joseph D. Ward	Secretary of the Commonwealth of Massachusetts; 1961–1967	Succeeded by John Davoren
Preceded by John F. Collins	Mayor of Boston; 1968–1984	Succeeded by Raymond Flynn
Party political offices
Preceded by Edward J. McCormack, Jr.	Democratic nominee for Governor of Massachusetts; 1970	Succeeded by Michael Dukakis
