= Statue of Kevin White =

Statue in Boston, Massachusetts, U.S.

- Artist: Pablo Eduardo
- Year: 2006
- Medium: Bronze sculpture
- Subject: Kevin White
- Location: Boston, Massachusetts, U.S.; 42°21′36.9″N 71°3′24.2″W

A 10-foot (3.0 m) bronze statue of Kevin White by Pablo Eduardo is installed in Boston's Faneuil Hall, in the U.S. state of Massachusetts. The sculpture was installed in 2006.
