= 1972 Democratic Party vice presidential candidate selection =

1972 Democratic vice presidential nomination
- July 13, 1972 (Thomas Eagleton); August 1, 1972 (Sargent Shiver)
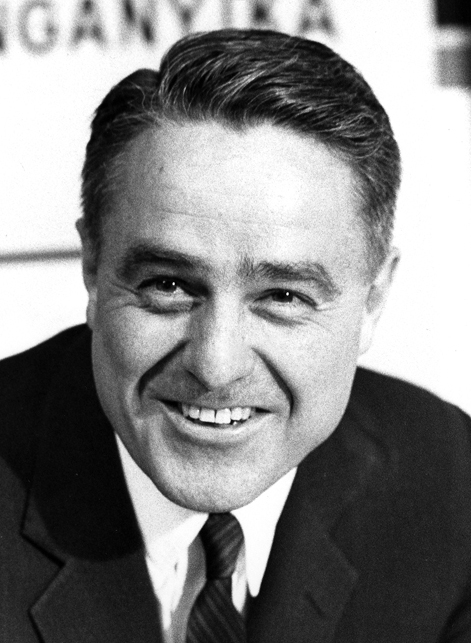

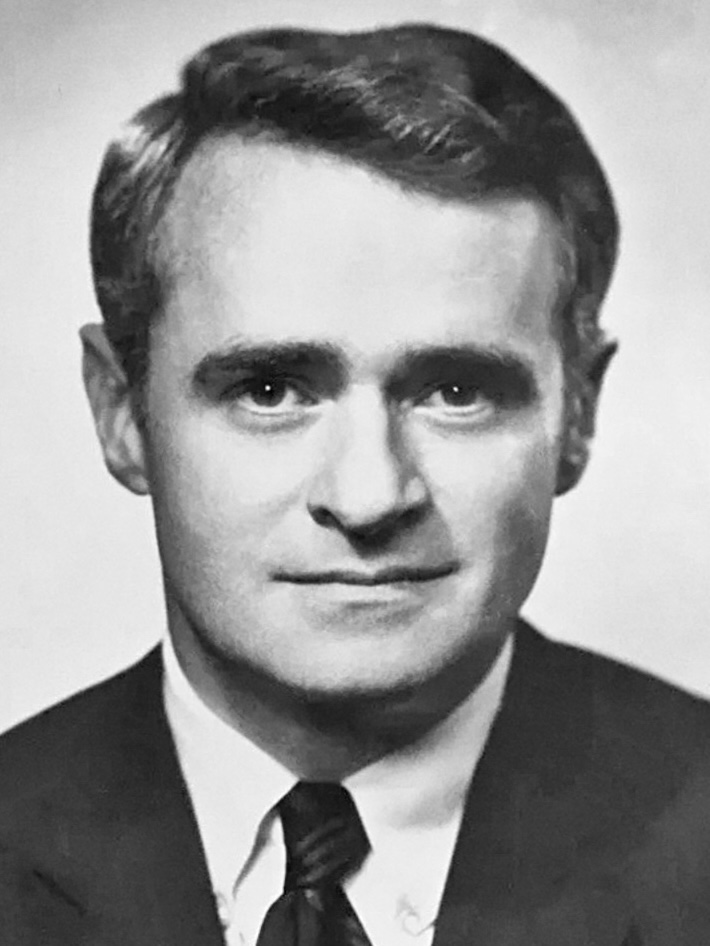
Nominee	Sargent Shriver	Thomas Eagleton (withdrew)
Home state	Maryland	Missouri
Previous Vice Presidential nominee
Edmund Muskie
Vice Presidential nominee
Thomas Eagleton (Until July 13)
Sargent Shriver (After Aug. 1)

This article lists those who were potential candidates for the Democratic nomination for Vice President of the United States in the 1972 election.

Coming into the 1972 Democratic National Convention, South Dakota Senator George McGovern had the delegate lead, but did not have the presidential nomination locked up. After winning the Democratic nomination for president on July 13, McGovern looked for a running mate. McGovern's first choice for vice president was Ted Kennedy, but Kennedy refused to join the ticket; Minnesota Senator Walter Mondale, Wisconsin Senator Gaylord Nelson, and Connecticut Senator Abraham A. Ribicoff also declined. McGovern offered the position to Missouri Senator Thomas Eagleton, who appealed to labor groups and Catholics, two groups that McGovern had alienated during the primary campaign. The ticket of McGovern and Eagleton was nominated by the 1972 Democratic National Convention.

Following the convention, it was revealed that Eagleton had received treatment for depression in the 1960s. Though McGovern considered keeping Eagleton on the ticket, he ultimately chose to replace Eagleton with former ambassador Sargent Shriver. The McGovern–Shriver ticket lost the presidential election to the Nixon–Agnew ticket. After the controversy surrounding Eagleton, future campaigns spent much more time vetting vice presidential candidates.

== Potential running mates ==
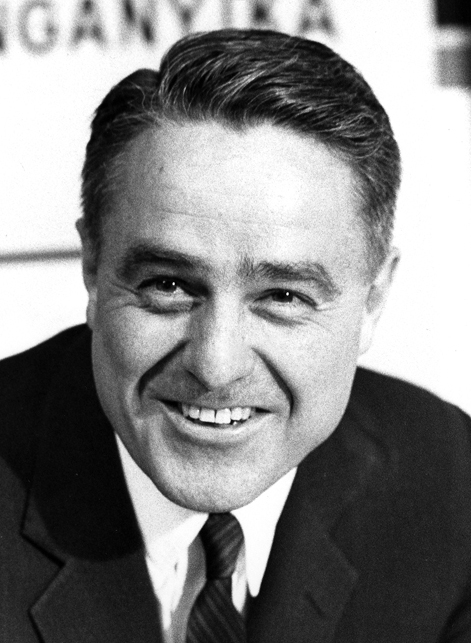
Former Ambassador
Sargent Shriver
from Maryland
(1968–1970)

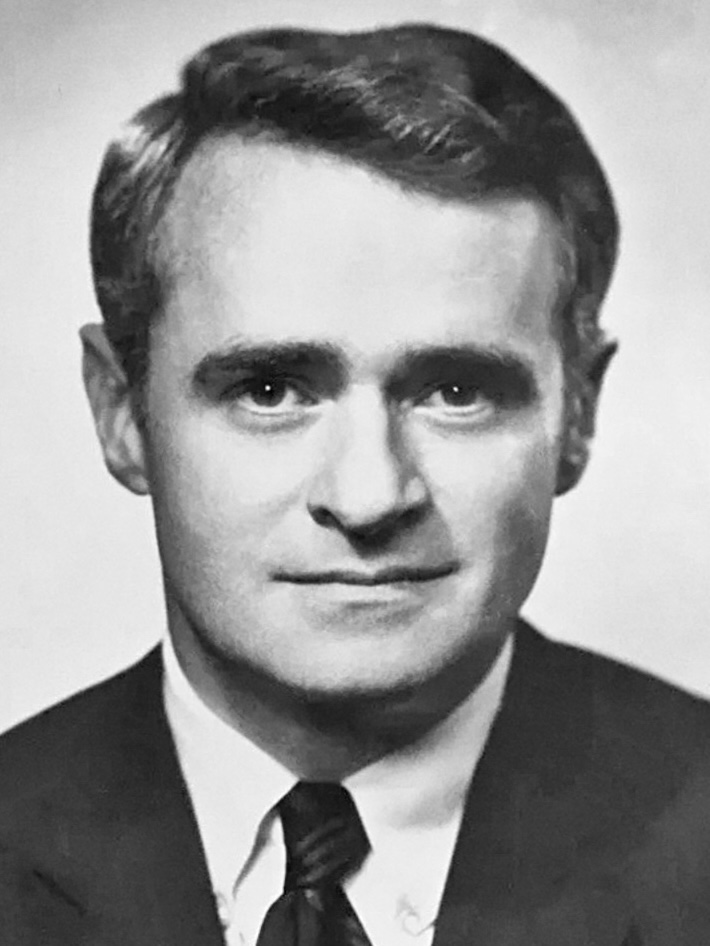
Senator
Thomas Eagleton
from Missouri
(1968–1987)

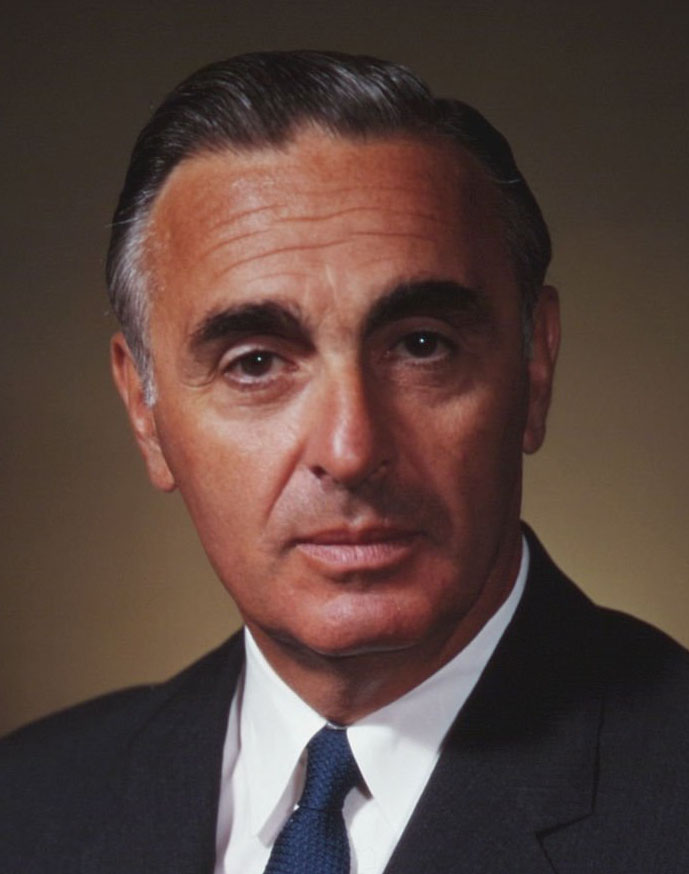
Senator
Abraham Ribicoff
from Connecticut
(1963–1981)
(declined)

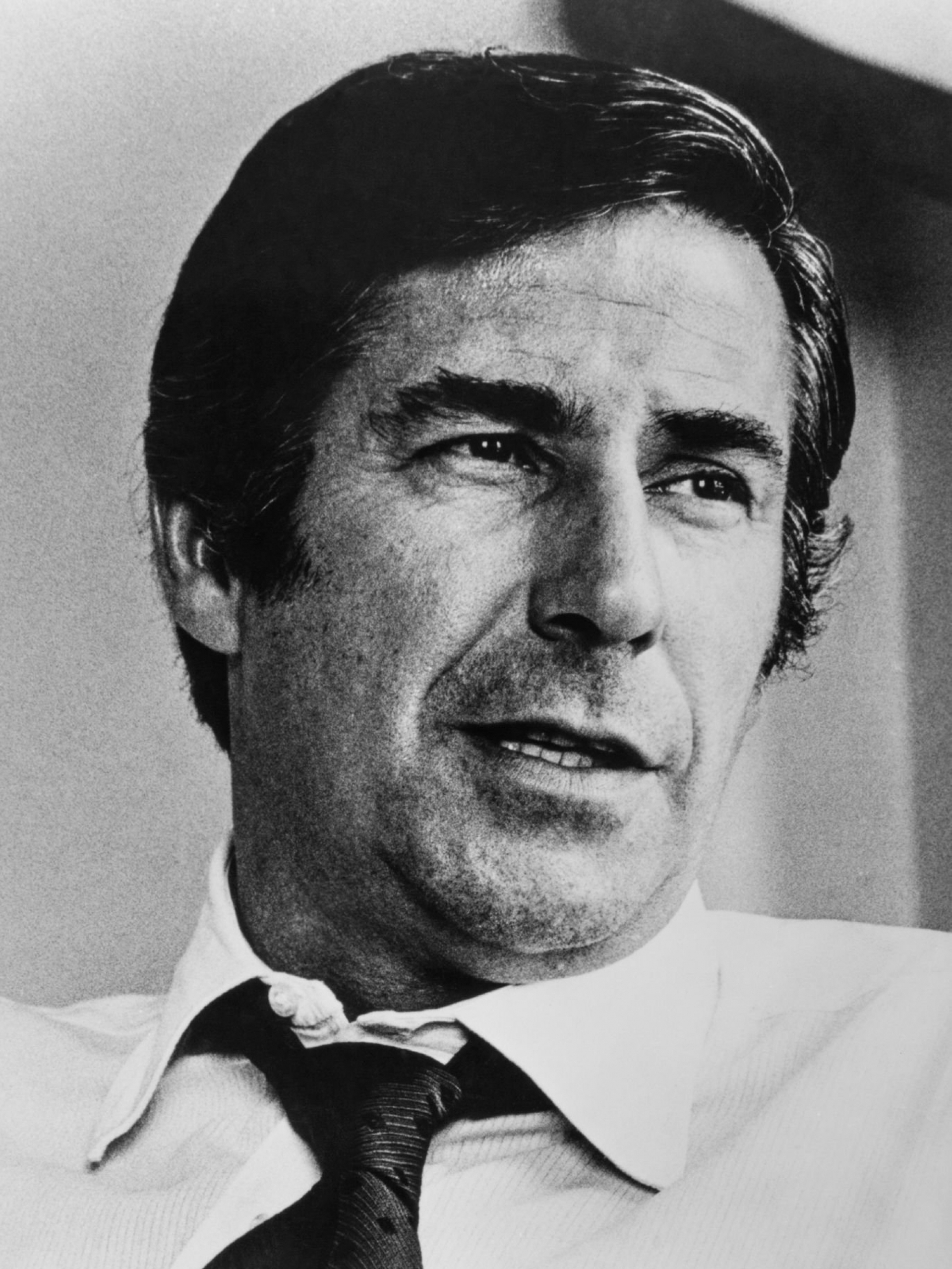
Senator
Mike Gravel
from Alaska
(1969–1981)

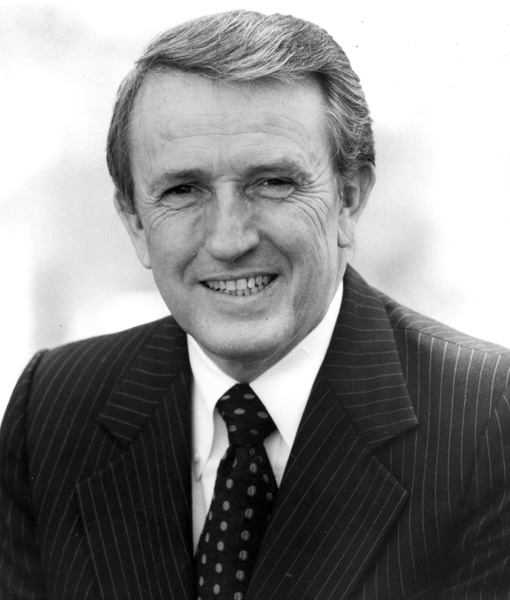
Governor
Dale Bumpers
of Arkansas
(1971–1975)

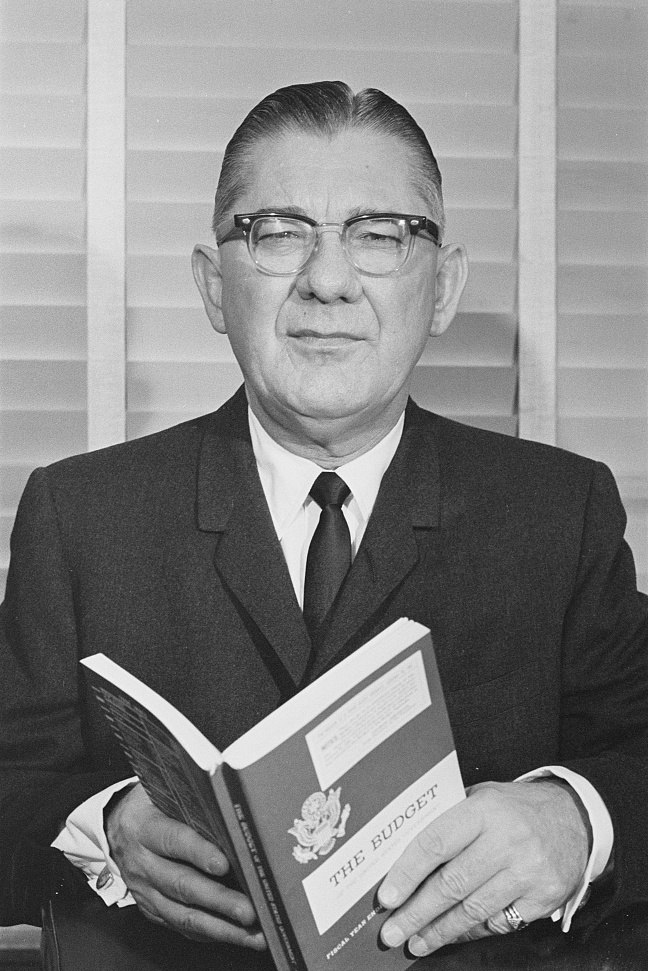
Representative and 1972 presidential candidate
Wilbur Mills
from Arkansas
(1939–1977)

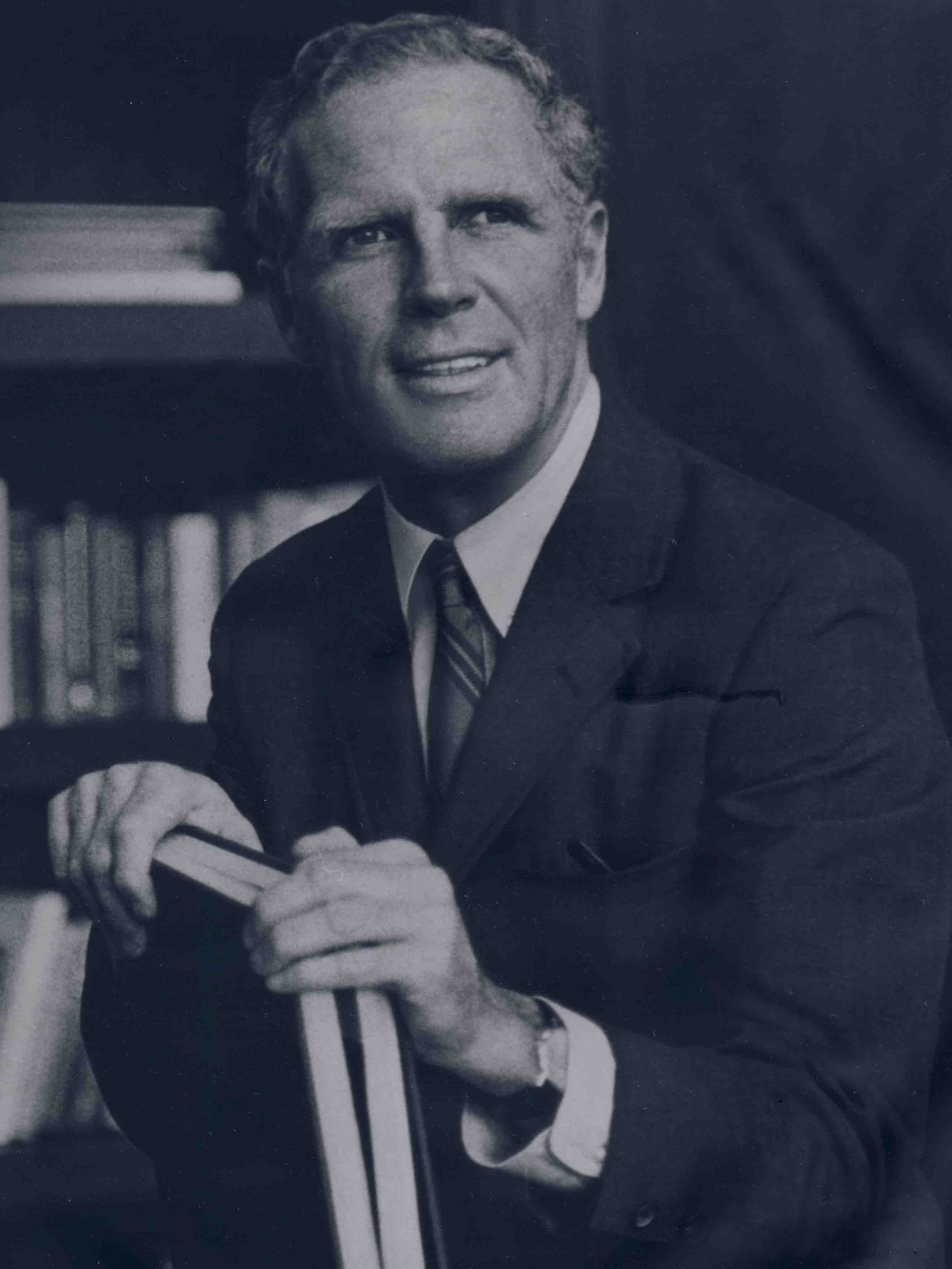
Mayor
Kevin White
of Boston, MA
(1968–1984)

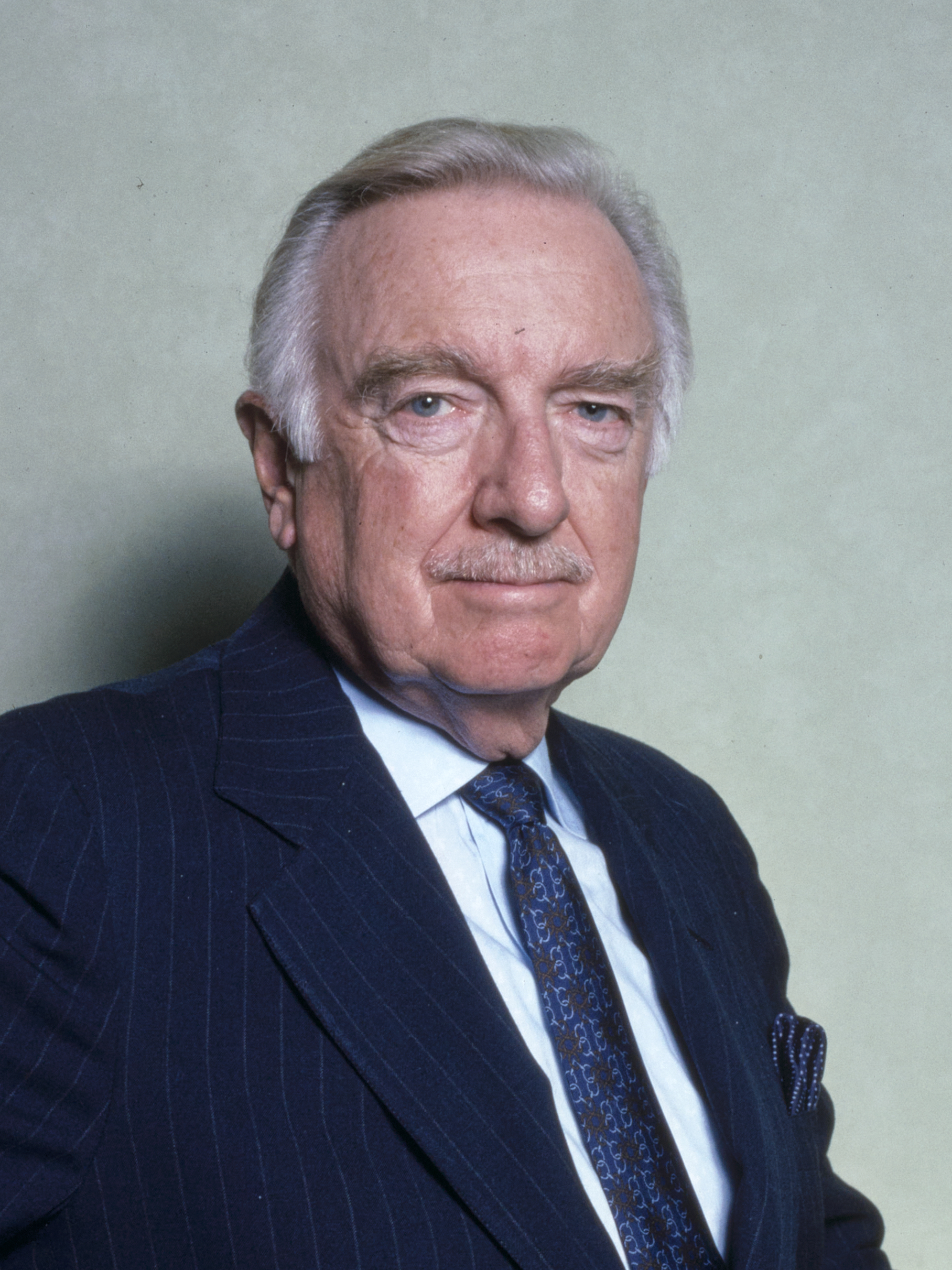
Anchor of the CBS Evening News
Walter Cronkite
of New York
(1962–1981)

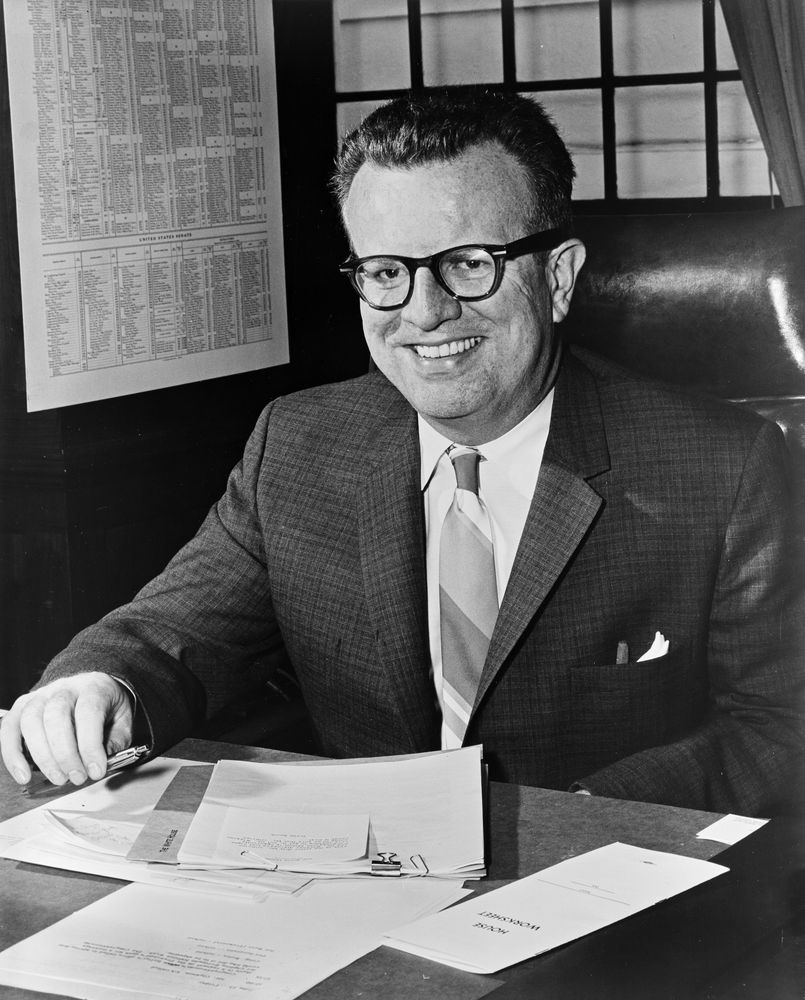
Chair of the Democratic National Committee
Larry O'Brien
from Massachusetts
(1970–1972; 1968-1969)

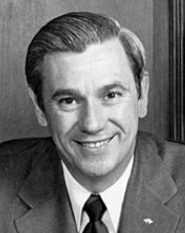
Governor
Reubin Askew
of Florida
(1971–1979)

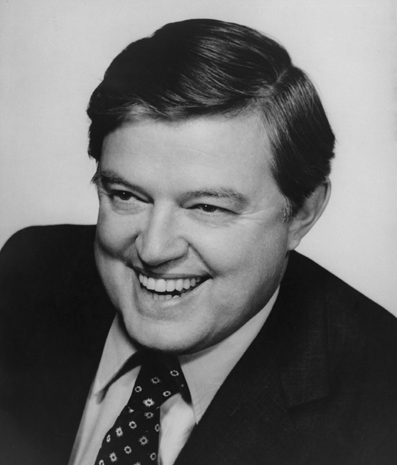
Senator
Frank Church
from Idaho
(1957–1981)

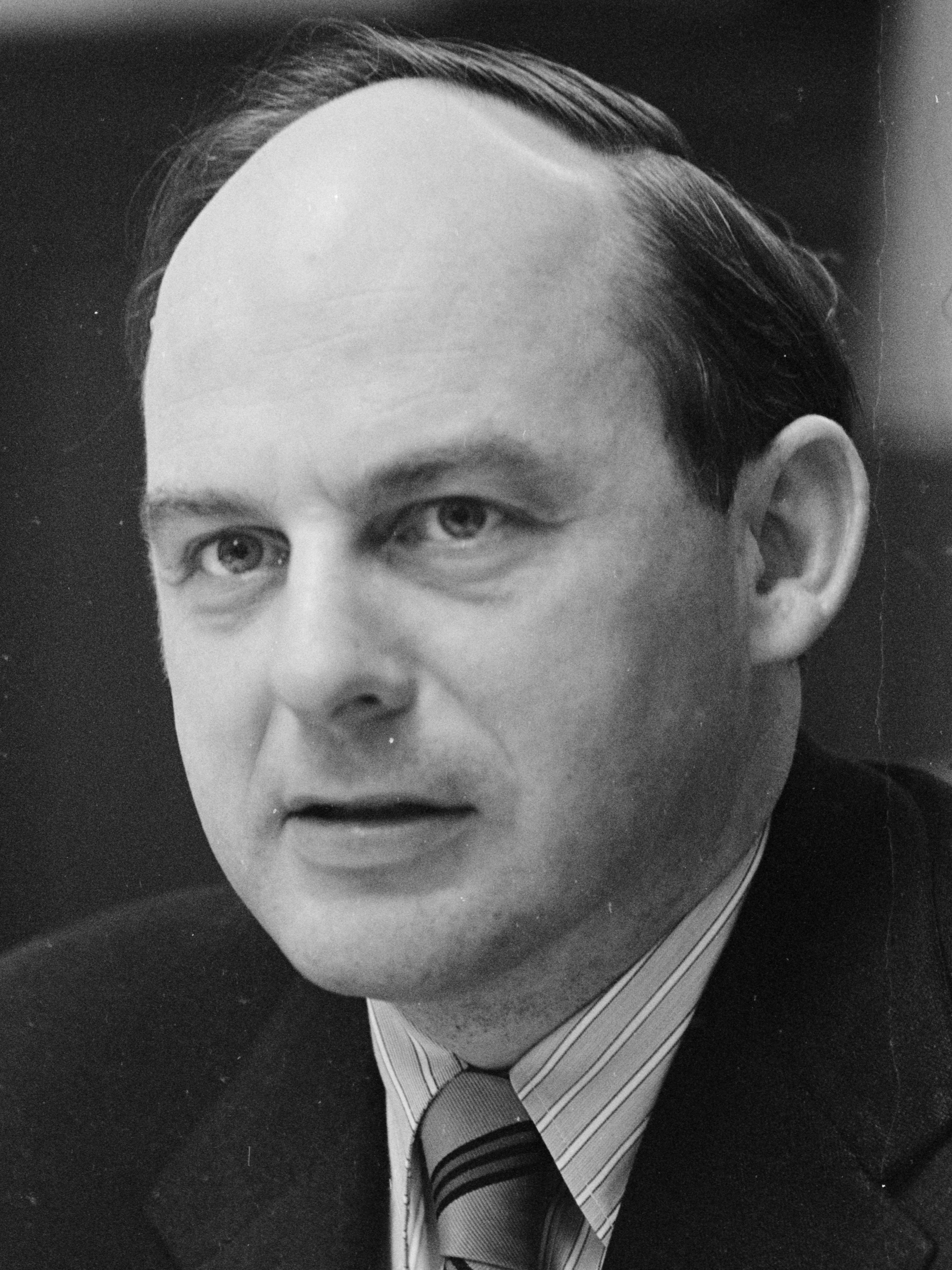
Senator
Adlai Stevenson III
from Illinois
(1970–1981)

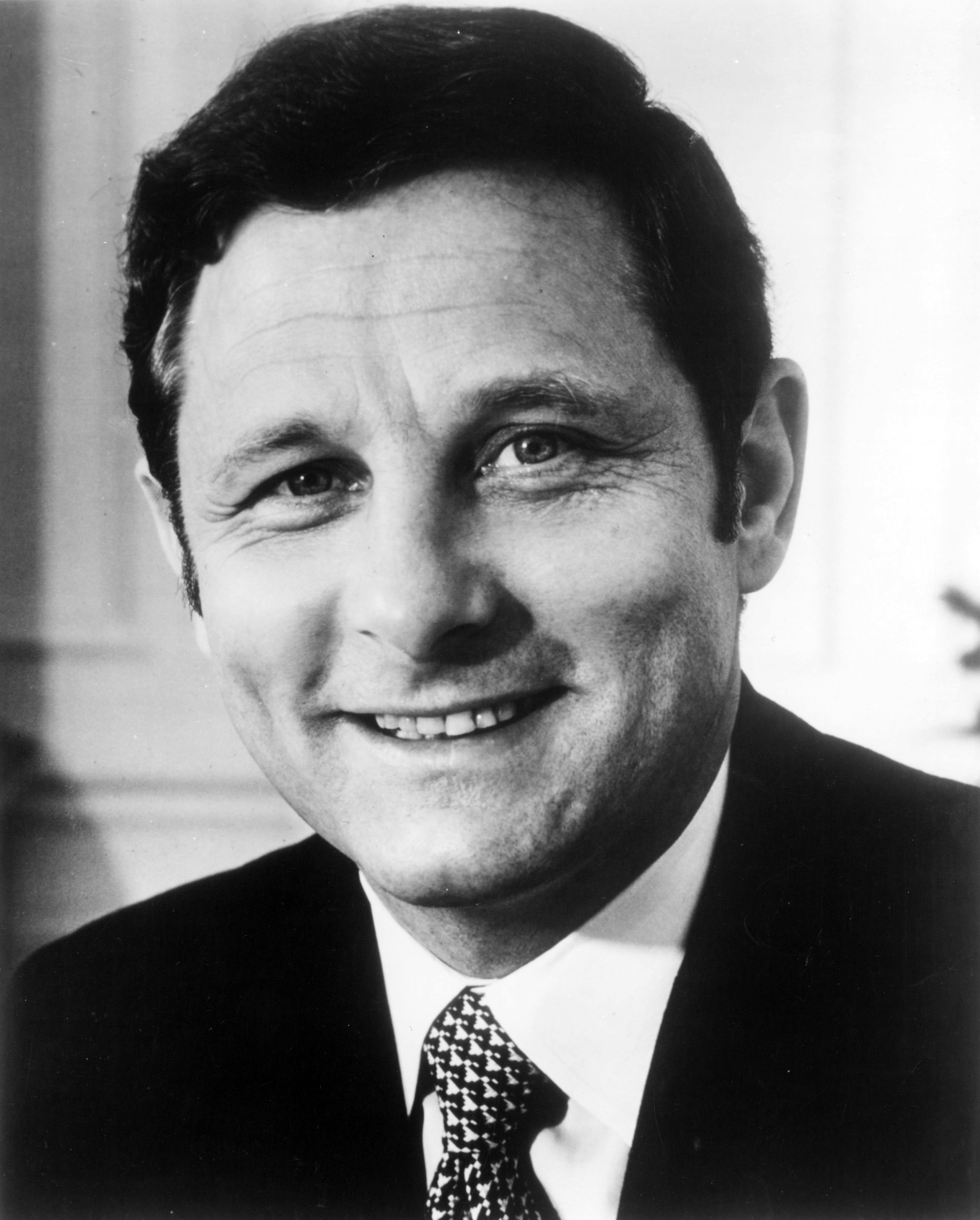
Senator
Birch Bayh
from Indiana
(1963–1981)

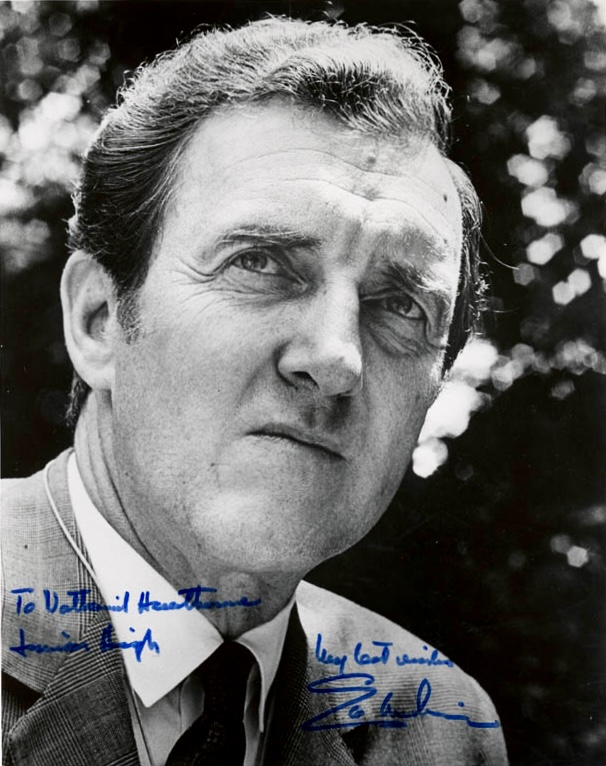
Senator, 1968 vice-presidential nominee, and 1972 presidential candidate
Edmund Muskie
from Maine
(1959–1980)

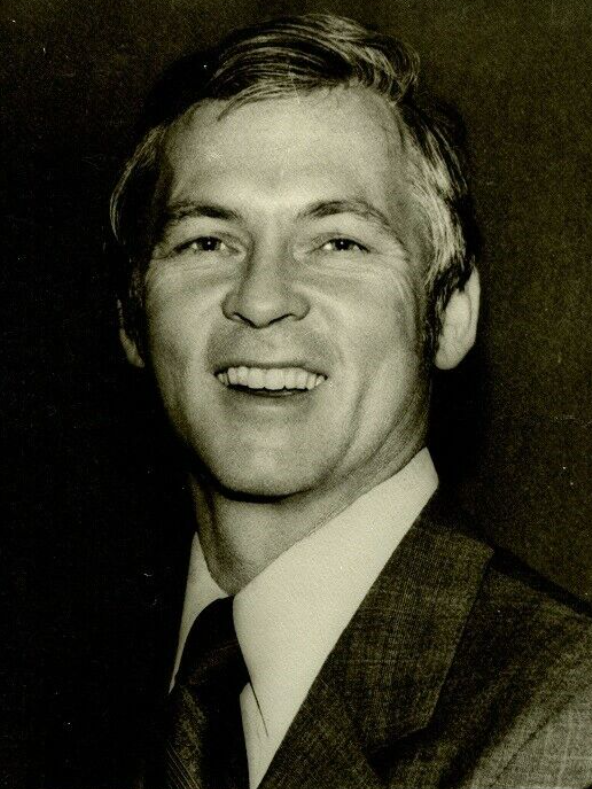
Former Governor
Endicott Peabody
of Massachusetts
(1963–1965)

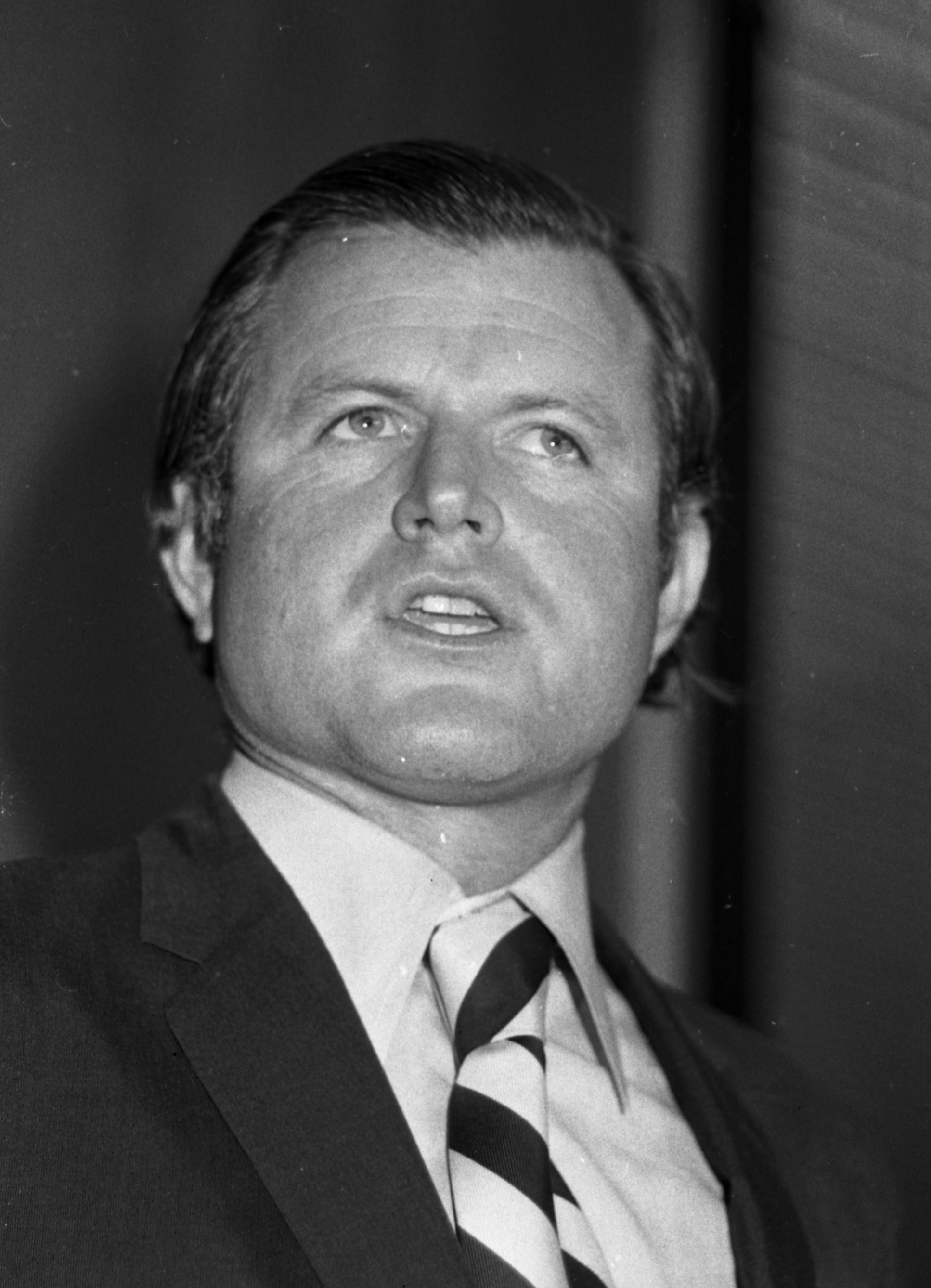
Senator
Ted Kennedy
from Massachusetts
(1962–2009)

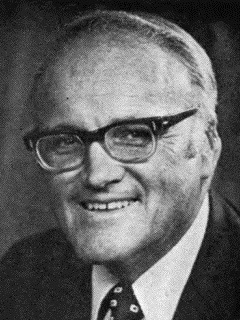
Representative
James G. O'Hara
from Michigan
(1959–1977)

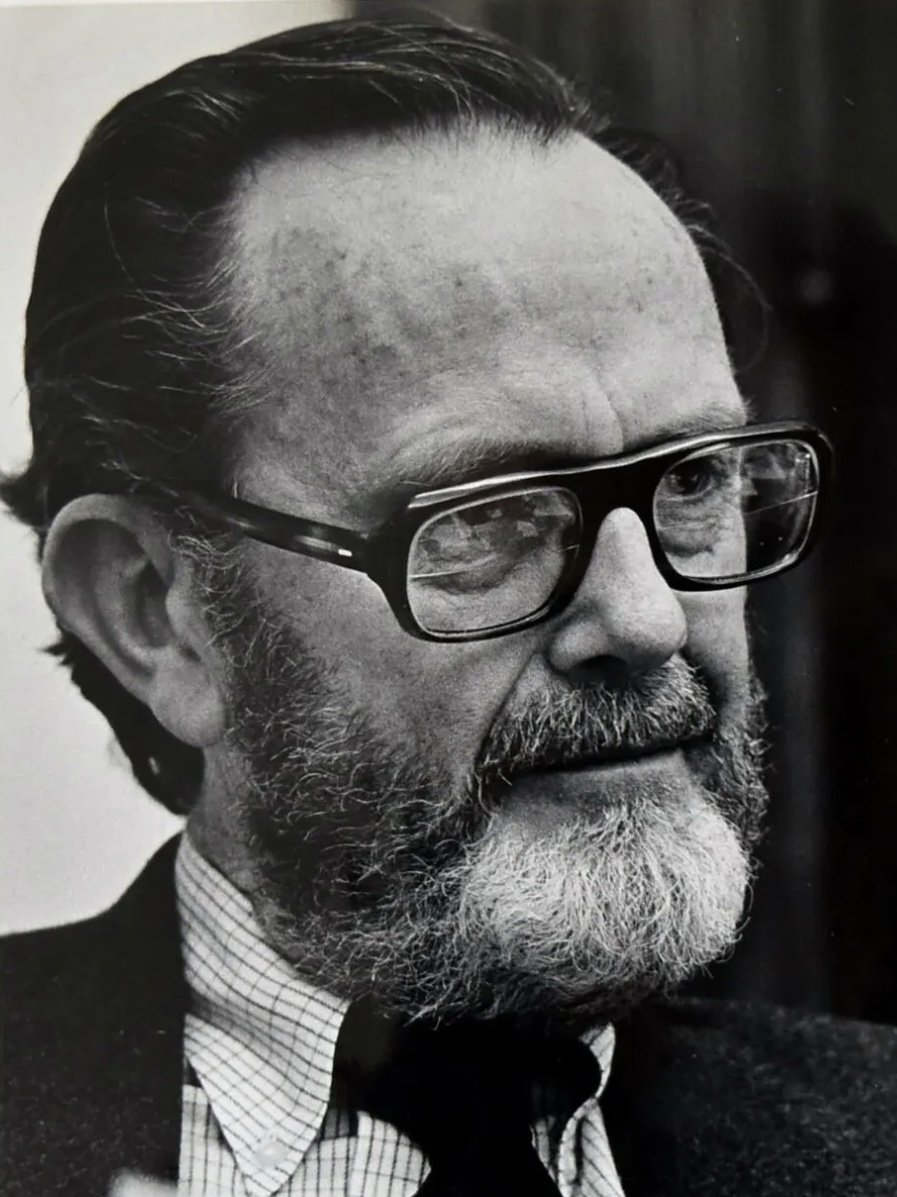
Senator
Philip Hart
from Michigan
(1959–1976)

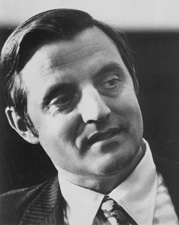
Senator
Walter Mondale
from Minnesota
(1964–1976)

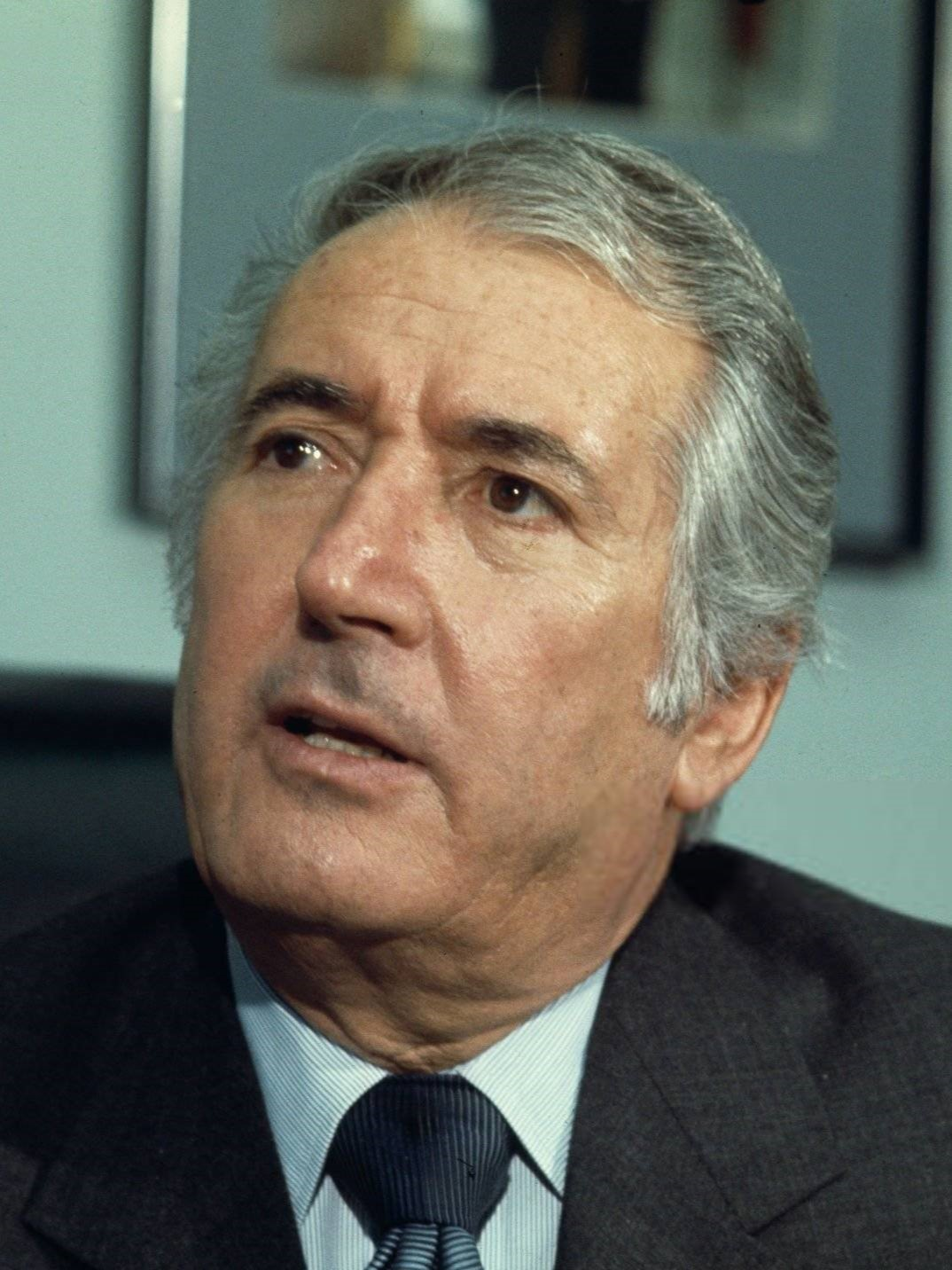
Representative
Peter Rodino
from New Jersey
(1949–1989)

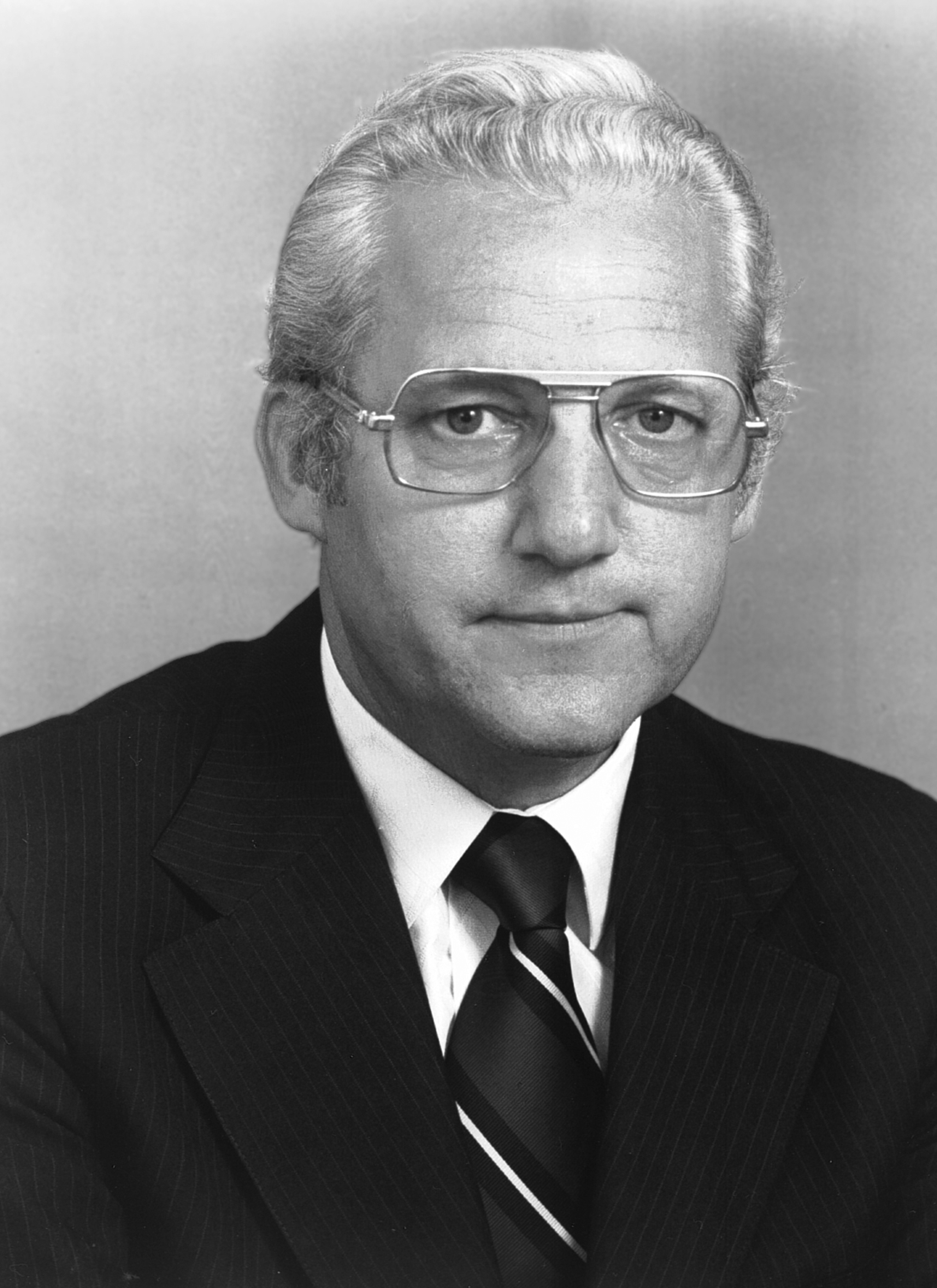
Mayor
Moon Landrieu
of New Orleans, LA
(1970–1978)

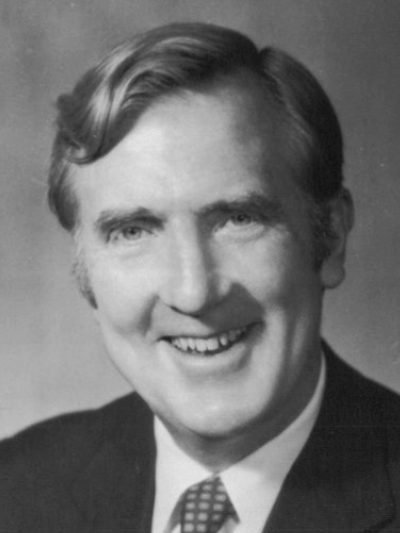
Governor
John J. Gilligan
of Ohio
(1971–1975)

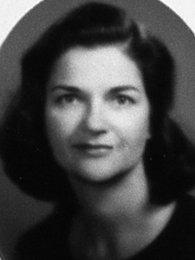
State Representative
Frances Farenthold
from Texas
(1969–1973)

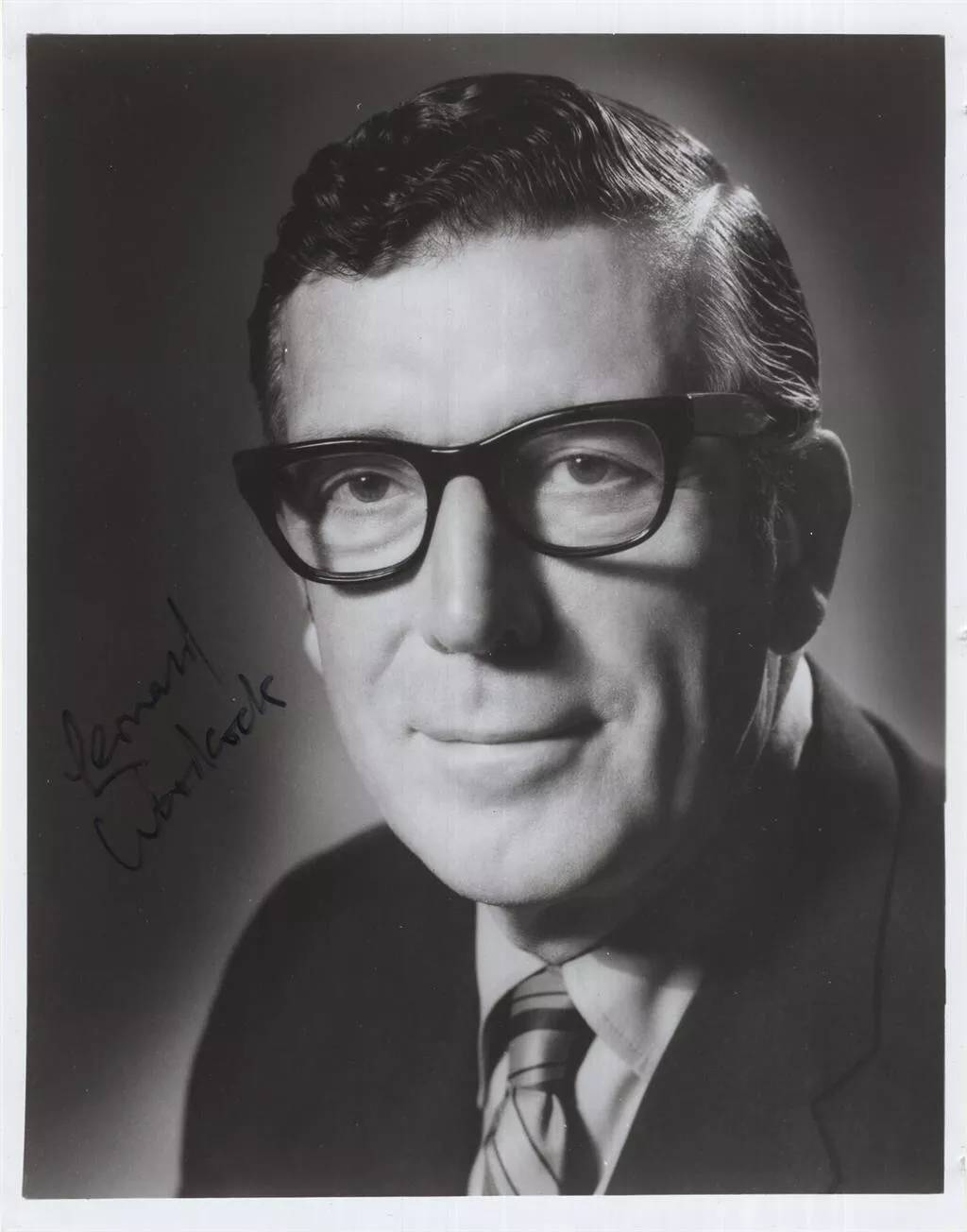
President of the United Auto Workers
Leonard Woodcock
from Michigan
(1970–1977)

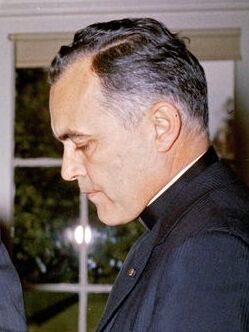
Chair of the United States Commission on Civil Rights
Father Theodore Hesburgh
from Indiana
(1969–1972)

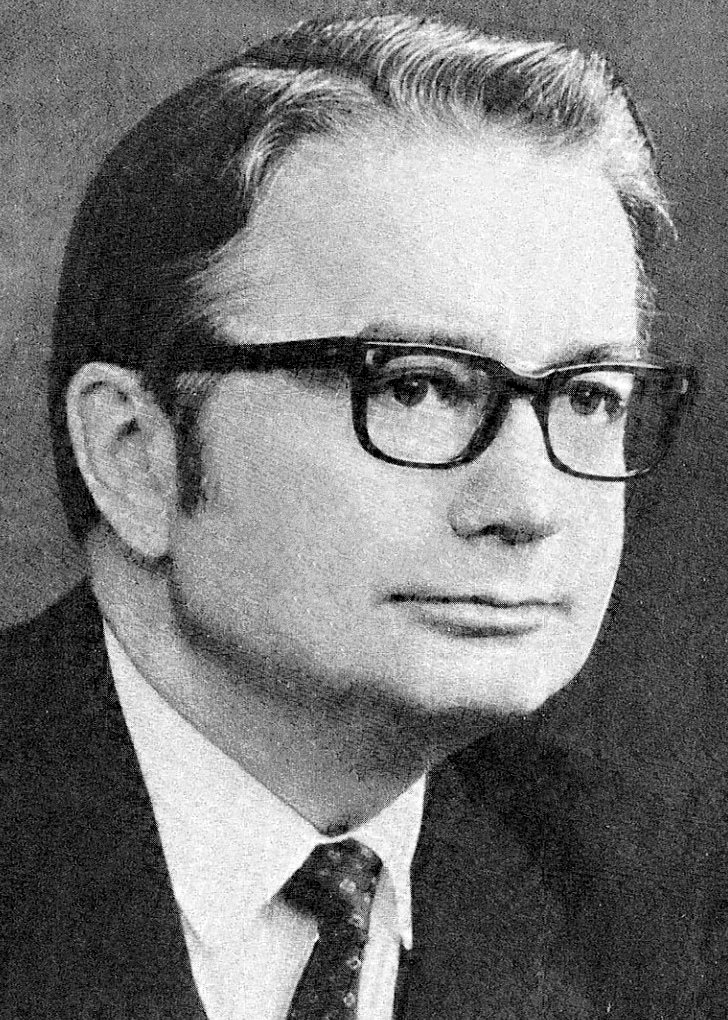
Governor
Patrick Lucey
of Wisconsin
(1971–1975)

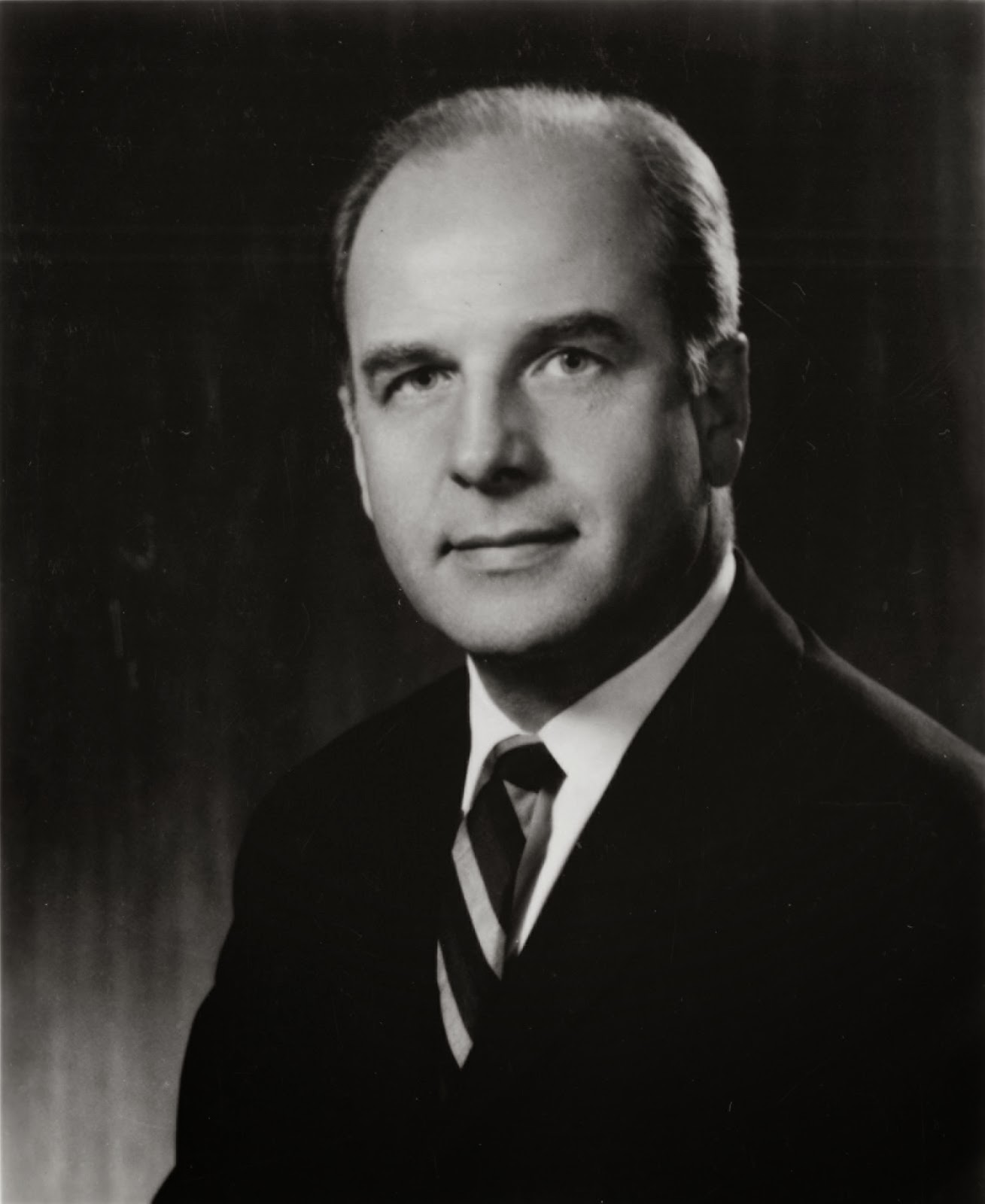
Senator
Gaylord Nelson
from Wisconsin
(1963–1981)

== Frances Farenthold's candidacy ==
At the 1972 Democratic National Convention, there was a grassroots effort to nominate Frances Farenthold, a Texas state representative and unsuccessful candidate for the Democratic nomination for governor of Texas. She had gained recognition due to her surprising, though unsuccessful, forced run-off against Texas’ incumbent Democratic Governor Preston Smith and former state representative Dolph Briscoe, the favorite for the nomination and eventual winner, in the Democratic primaries.

The effort to nominate her for vice president came after the realization that Shirley Chisholm, the first major black candidate for President of the United States, would not have the delegates necessary to win the nomination at the convention. Chisholm had had the endorsement of and had helped found the National Women's Political Caucus, a new organization formed in Washington, D.C. in 1971. Following her convention defeat, the caucus had moved to recruit Farenthold to run for the vice presidency. The individual chosen to place Francis “Sissy” Farenthold's name in nomination for vice president would be Gloria Steinem, the co-founder of Ms. magazine.

Although the nomination effort aroused the convention-goers mired in malaise and anger from the difficult 1972 Democratic National Convention, the campaign for her vice presidency was highly disorganized and last-minute, without a serious chance at denying Senator Thomas Eagleton his nomination by George McGovern. Despite coming from the state of Texas, the Texas delegation, controlled by Dolph Briscoe, did not support her candidacy. Regardless, the balloting for vice president finished with Farenthold receiving 405 delegates, and 13.73% of the vote, the second-most of all of the candidates.

Farenthold was the first serious female candidate for the nomination for vice president of the United States by either major party. She would go on to once again compete with and lose to Dolph Briscoe for the Democratic nomination for governor of Texas in 1974.

== See also ==
- 1972 Democratic National Convention
- 1972 Democratic Party presidential primaries
