= 2018 Massachusetts gubernatorial election =

- November 6, 2018
- Turnout: 60.17% ▲9.33%
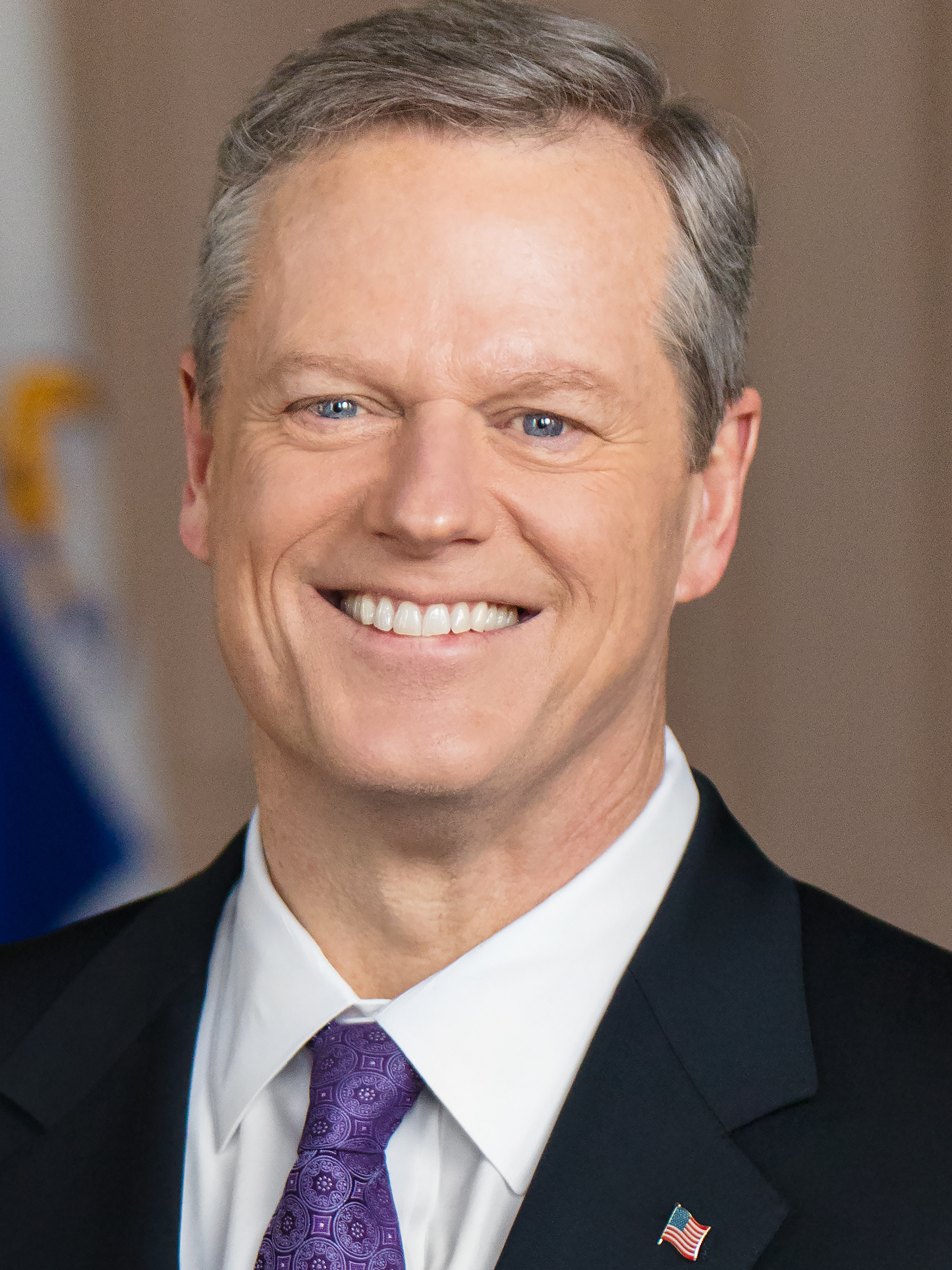

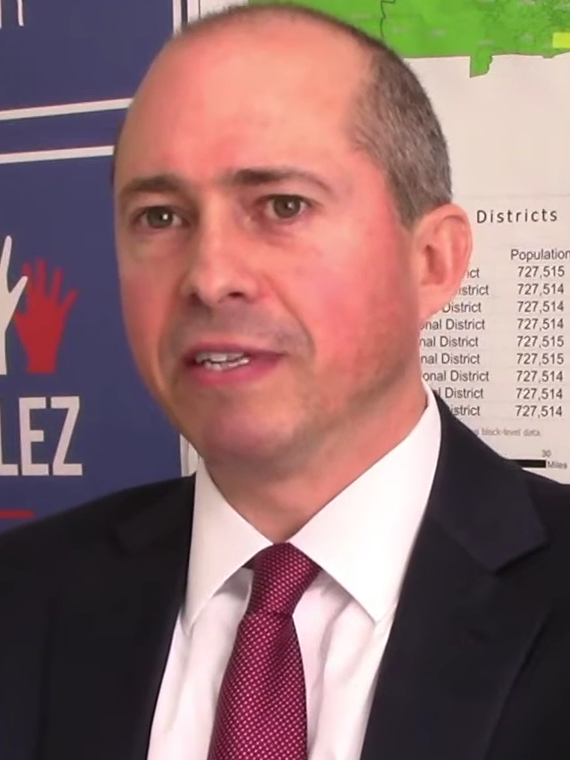
Nominee	Charlie Baker	Jay Gonzalez
Party	Republican	Democratic
Running mate	Karyn Polito	Quentin Palfrey
Popular vote	1,781,341	885,770
Percentage	66.59%	33.12%
- Baker: 40–50% 50–60% 60–70% 70–80% 80–90% Gonzalez: 40–50% 50–60% 60–70% 70–80% Tie: 40–50% 50%
Governor before election
Charlie Baker
Republican
Elected Governor
Charlie Baker
Republican

The 2018 Massachusetts gubernatorial election took place on November 6, 2018, to elect the governor and lieutenant governor of the Commonwealth of Massachusetts. Republican Governor Charlie Baker and Lieutenant Governor Karyn Polito won election to a second term in office, defeating Democratic challengers Jay Gonzalez and Quentin Palfrey, respectively. Candidates were selected in the primary election held on September 4, 2018.

This was one of eight Republican-held governorships up for election in a state that Hillary Clinton won in the 2016 presidential election. Despite Massachusetts's Democratic lean at the presidential level, Charlie Baker retained high approval ratings and was expected to safely win re-election. Shortly after polls closed at 8 p.m. local time, the Associated Press declared the race in favor of incumbents Baker and Polito. Shortly after 9 p.m. location time, Gonzalez conceded the election.

Baker was re-elected with the highest vote total in the history of Massachusetts gubernatorial elections and by the widest margin since Bill Weld was re-elected governor in 1994. He won many of the Commonwealth's most populated cities, including Worcester, New Bedford, and Springfield. Baker almost won Boston, losing it by only around 3,000 votes, an extraordinary showing for a statewide Republican candidate in a major city. Baker also carried every county in the state.

As of 2026, this is the most recent election in which a Republican was elected to a statewide office in Massachusetts.

== Background ==
Charlie Baker was elected in 2014 by a slim margin over then-Attorney General Martha Coakley; however, he was consistently rated as one of the most popular governors in the country. Some Democrats, including Congressman Mike Capuano and Speaker of the House Bob DeLeo publicly, speculated that they might vote for Baker over the eventual Democratic nominee. Speculated candidates such as Attorney General Maura Healey, Congressman Joe Kennedy, former state senator Dan Wolf, and Boston Mayor Marty Walsh all declined to be candidates, leaving no prominent Democrats to challenge Baker, which was seen as a necessary prerequisite to mount a formidable challenge to him.

Because Evan Falchuk received more than 3% of the vote in the 2014 gubernatorial election, the United Independent Party gained official status. Falchuck had stated that he would "certainly" run for office in 2018. In 2016, however, the UIP lost its official party status after it failed to register 1% of Massachusetts voters as members. Falchuk later left the UIP and registered as a Democrat in early 2017.

== Republican primary ==
There was some concern amongst the Republican Party that Baker was too moderate, and there were talks of challenging him with a more conservative opponent in the primaries. GOP state committeeman Robert Cappucci told the Boston Herald that if Baker "shuns conservatives [...] there will be 100 percent an effort to try to find a conservative, viable candidate to challenge him in 2018 for governor". David Kopacz, the president of the Massachusetts Republican Assembly, also stated that Baker might face a conservative challenger in 2018.

Following his 2016 election, Barnstable County Commissioner Ron Beaty, who once was tried and convicted for threatening the life of President George H. W. Bush, had been making local and state headlines. He proposed a "shark mitigation strategy" to combat the growing presence of sharks near Cape Cod beaches by baiting and shooting them, which was rejected for consideration by the commission chairman. He also mulled a primary run against his state representative, Randy Hunt, after Hunt parked in his Barnstable County Courthouse parking spot. In September 2017 he announced he was in the process of changing the purpose of his campaign committee from a county to a statewide office. He cited the governor's criticisms of President Donald Trump and his willingness to work with Democrats as his inspiration to run. On December 8, 2017, Scott Lively announced his campaign.

On December 13, 2017, Beaty stated he was no longer considering a run against Baker. Scott Lively, an evangelical pastor, challenged Baker and received more than the 15% of delegate votes necessary at the state convention to qualify for ballot access. Baker won the endorsement of the party by an overwhelming margin.

Baker ultimately won the nomination, but not without Lively securing 36 percent of the primary vote, leading to speculation that Baker's more moderate disposition and opposition to President Trump might have damaged his general election chances with Republican base voters.

=== Governor ===
==== Candidates ====
===== Declared =====
- Charlie Baker, incumbent governor
- Scott Lively, pastor and independent candidate for governor in 2014

===== Declined =====
- Ron Beaty, Barnstable County commissioner (running for state representative, endorsed Lively)

==== Endorsements ====
Charlie Baker

Local officials

- Sefatia Romeo Theken, mayor of Gloucester

Organizations

- Massachusetts Republican Party

Newspapers

- The Boston Globe
- Boston Herald
Scott Lively

Local officials

- Ron Beaty, Barnstable County commissioner and candidate for state representative

==== Polling ====
Poll source	Date(s) administered	Sample size	Margin of error	Charlie Baker	Scott Lively	Other	Undecided
MassINC	June 22–25, 2018	399	± 4.9%	70%	17%	2%	10%

==== Results ====
===== Convention =====
Republican convention vote, April 28
Party	Candidate	Votes	%
Republican	Charlie Baker (incumbent)	1,577	69.8%
Republican	Scott Lively	626	27.7%
Republican	Other	57	2.5%
Total votes		2,260	100.0%

===== Primary =====
Republican gubernatorial primary results by municipality

Republican gubernatorial primary results by county: Baker—60–70% Baker—50–60%

Republican primary, September 4
Party	Candidate	Votes	%
Republican	Charlie Baker (incumbent)	174,126	63.78%
Republican	Scott Lively	98,421	36.05%
Republican	All others	464	0.17%
Total votes		273,011	100.00%

=== Lieutenant governor ===
==== Candidates ====
===== Declared =====
- Karyn Polito, incumbent lieutenant governor

==== Results ====
Republican lieutenant gubernatorial primary results by county: Polito—>90%

Republican primary results
Party	Candidate	Votes	%
Republican	Karyn Polito (incumbent)	204,914	98.8
Republican	All others	2,571	1.2
Total votes		207,485	100.0

== Democratic primary ==
In November 2014, after interviewing over a dozen Democratic operatives, strategists, and activists, Joshua Miller of The Boston Globe wrote that the party would be looking for a young, fresh candidate who could appeal to the party's progressive base. He identified Attorney General Maura Healey as being "the first name on many Democratic lists". Samantha Lachman of The Huffington Post also identified Healey as a potential candidate for governor in 2018 or in a future United States Senate race.

As of July 2017, the declared candidates were relatively unknown to the state's voters. Their identification by Democratic voters was bolstered by addressing the 2017 state Democratic Convention, which saw its largest attendance in years, of around 3,000 delegates.

On April 26, 2018, Setti Warren announced via Facebook that he was withdrawing from the race due to financial concerns. He stated he would not endorse either of his former opponents until the nomination was won.

At the Massachusetts Democratic Convention in June, party delegates endorsed Gonzalez and Palfrey, but Bob Massie and Jimmy Tingle also surpassed the 15% threshold for ballot access by comfortable margins. A poll from late June conducted by WBUR and MassInc. indicated that the contest for the Democratic nomination in the gubernatorial race was a toss-up, with Massie and Gonzalez being separated by a percentage smaller than the margin of error.

Gonzalez and Palfrey went on to win their respective nominations generously (winning almost every municipality in the state) and headed into the general election to face their Republican counterparts.

=== Governor ===
==== Candidates ====
===== Declared =====
- Jay Gonzalez, private health insurance executive, corporate lawyer, former state secretary of administration and finance
- Bob Massie, co-founder of the Global Reporting Initiative, former executive director of Ceres, former president of the New Economy Coalition, ordained Episcopal minister, nominee for lieutenant governor in 1994, candidate for the U.S. Senate in 2012

===== Withdrew =====
- Setti Warren, former mayor of Newton and candidate for the U.S. Senate in 2012

===== Declined =====
- Joe Avellone, businessman, former chairman of the Wellesley Board of selectmen and candidate for governor in 2014
- Jeff Bussgang, venture capitalist and lecturer at Harvard Business School
- Katherine Clark, U.S. representative (running for reelection)
- Evan Falchuk, founder and former chair of the United Independent Party and United Independent nominee for governor in 2014
- Maura Healey, Massachusetts attorney general (ran for reelection)
- Joe Kennedy III, U.S. representative (ran for reelection)
- John Kerry, former United States secretary of state, former U.S. senator, former lieutenant governor of Massachusetts and nominee for president in 2004
- Paul Mark, state representative (endorsed Jay Gonzalez)
- Marty Meehan, president of the University of Massachusetts System and former U.S. representative
- Seth Moulton, U.S. representative (ran for reelection)
- Marty Walsh, mayor of Boston and former state representative
- Dan Wolf, businessman and former state senator

==== Endorsements ====
Jay Gonzalez

State elected officials

- Suzanne Bump, auditor of Massachusetts
- Steve Grossman, former treasurer and receiver-general of Massachusetts and former chairman of the Democratic National Committee

State legislators

- William Brownsberger, state senator
- Harriette Chandler, State Senate President emerita
- Julian Cyr, state senator
- Daniel Donahue, state representative
- Jamie Eldridge, state senator
- Tricia Farley-Bouvier, state representative
- Dylan Fernandes, state representative
- Sean Garballey, state representative
- Anne Gobi, state senator
- Natalie Higgins, state representative
- Mary Keefe, state representative
- Eric Lesser, state senator
- Barbara L'Italien, state senator
- John J. Mahoney, state representative
- Paul Mark, state representative
- Michael O. Moore, state senator
- James O'Day, state representative
- Sarah Peake, state representative
- John Scibak, state representative
- Paul Tucker, state representative

Local elected officials

- Dante Comparetto, Worcester School Committee member
- Khrystian King, Worcester City Councilor
- Molly McCullough, Worcester School Committee member
- Candy F. Mero-Carlson, Worcester City Councilor
- Sean Rose, Worcester City Councilor
- Paul Schlichtman, Arlington School Committee member
- Michelle Wu, at-large Boston City Councilor, former Boston City Council president

Individuals

- Kate Donaghue, DNC and Massachusetts DSC member

Labor unions

- National Association of Government Employees

Organizations

- Massachusetts Democratic Party
- Progressive Democrats of Massachusetts

Newspapers

- Boston Globe
Setti Warren (withdrew)

Officials

- Michael Dukakis, former governor of Massachusetts and Democratic nominee for president in 1988
- Solomon Goldstein-Rose, state representative
- David Narkewicz, mayor of Northampton

Organizations

- Democracy for America
Bob Massie

State legislators

- Michelle DuBois, state representative
- Michael Moran, state representative
- Matt Patrick, former state representative
- Dave Rogers, state representative

Local elected officials

- Barbara Brousal-Glaser, Newton city councilor
- Jesse Clingan, Somerville alderman
- Matthew Cubetus, vice chair of the Sandwich Planning Board and candidate for the Barnstable County Assembly of Delegates
- Joseph Curtatone, mayor of Somerville
- Jan Devereux, vice mayor of Cambridge
- Ben Ewen-Campen, Somerville alderman
- Andre Green, Somerville School Committee member
- Stephanie Hirsch, Somerville alderman
- Alison Leary, Newton city councilor
- Gary Mannion Jr., Greater Lawrence Technical School Committee member and Lawrence Democratic City Committee chair
- Nadeem Mazen, former Cambridge city councillor
- Wilfred Mbah, Somerville alderman
- John Michitson, Haverhill City Council president
- Quinton Zondervan, Cambridge city councillor

Party officials

- Jim Sperelakis, West Newbury Democratic Town Committee chair
- Solomon Steen, Young Democrats of Massachusetts public policy director
- Parwez Wahid, Massachusetts DSC member

Individuals

- Chuck Collins, senior scholar at the Institute for Policy Studies
- Frances Crowe, activist
- Todd Gitlin, professor of journalism and sociology at Columbia University and former president of Students for a Democratic Society
- Gabe Itoka, entrepreneur
- Bill McKibben, author, educator, environmentalist, and co-founder of 350.org
- Juliet Schor, professor of sociology at Boston College
- Leslie Sterling, reverend of St. Bartholomew's Episcopal Church
- Laurence Tribe, professor of constitutional law at Harvard Law School
- Joe Uehlein, former AFL–CIO director of Strategic Campaigns
- Julie Wormser, former Boston Harbor Association executive director

Labor unions

- United Auto Workers Region 9A

Organizations

- 350 Action
- Massachusetts Peace Action
- Our Revolution
- Our Revolution Massachusetts (ORMA)

Newspapers

- Blue Mass Group
- Boston Herald

==== Polling ====
Poll source	Date(s) administered	Sample size	Margin of error	Jay Gonzalez	Bob Massie	Other	Undecided
MassINC	June 22–25, 2018	418	± 4.9%	21%	15%	7%	52%

==== Results ====
Democratic gubernatorial primary results by municipality

Democratic gubernatorial primary results by county: Gonzalez—70–80% Gonzalez—60–70% Gonzalez—50–60%

Democratic primary results
Party	Candidate	Votes	%
Democratic	Jay Gonzalez	348,434	63.17
Democratic	Bob Massie	192,404	34.88
N/a	All others	10,742	1.95
Total votes		551,580	100.0

=== Lieutenant governor ===
==== Candidates ====
===== Declared =====
- Quentin Palfrey, former senior advisor to the president for jobs & competitiveness
- Jimmy Tingle, humorist and activist

===== Declined =====
- Paul Mark, state representative
- Patrick McDermott, Norfolk County Register of Probate
- Jon Mitchell, mayor of New Bedford
- Matt O'Malley, Boston City Councilor
- Ayanna Pressley, Boston City Councilor (running for MA-7)

==== Endorsements ====
Quentin Palfrey

National figures

- Gary Locke, former U.S. ambassador to China and former U.S. secretary of commerce
- Ken Salazar, former U.S. secretary of the interior

State legislators

- Will Brownsberger, state senator
- Cynthia Creem, state senate majority leader
- Bill Driscoll, state representative
- Jamie Eldridge, state senator
- Tricia Farley-Bouvier, state representative
- Dylan Fernandes, state representative
- Cindy Friedman, state senator
- Anne Gobi, state senator
- Jon Hecht, state representative
- Natalie Higgins, state representative
- Adam Hinds, state senator
- Russell Holmes, state representative
- Eric Lesser, state senator
- Jack Patrick Lewis, state representative
- Paul Tucker, state representative

Local elected officials

- Matthew Cubetus, vice chair of the Sandwich Planning Board and candidate for the Barnstable County Assembly of Delegates
- Sabrina Heisey, candidate for state representative in the 36th Middlesex District
- Steve Kerrigan, Massachusetts DSC member and 2014 nominee for lieutenant governor
- David Narkewicz, mayor of Northampton

Organizations

- Ashby Democratic Town Committee
- Boston Ward 5 Democratic Committee
- Indivisible Acton
- Indivisible Northampton
- Massachusetts Democratic Party
- Progressive Democrats of Massachusetts
- Progressive Massachusetts

Unions

- American Federation of Teachers-Massachusetts
- National Association of Social Workers-Massachusetts (NASW-MA PACE)
Jimmy Tingle

Federal legislators

- Barney Frank, former U.S. representative from Massachusetts's 4th congressional district
- Jim McGovern, U.S. representative from Massachusetts's 2nd congressional district

State officials

- Steve Grossman, former treasurer and receiver-general of Massachusetts
- Tom O'Neill, former lieutenant governor of Massachusetts

State legislators

- Mike Connolly, state representative
- Marc Pacheco, state senator
- Sarah Peake, state representative

Local elected officials

- Peter Koutoujian, sheriff of Middlesex County
- Paul Schlichtman, Arlington School Committee member

==== Results ====
Democratic lieutenant gubernatorial primary results by county: Palfrey—70–80% Palfrey—60–70% Palfrey—50–60% Tingle—40–50%

Democratic primary results
Party	Candidate	Votes	%
Democratic	Quentin Palfrey	307,240	58.5
Democratic	Jimmy Tingle	214,204	40.8
n/a	All others	3,757	0.7
Total votes		525,201	100.0

== General election ==
=== Debates ===
2018 Massachusetts gubernatorial election debates
No.	Date	Host	Moderator	Link	Republican	Democratic
Key: P Participant A Absent N Not invited I Invited W Withdrawn						
Key: P Participant A Absent N Not invited I Invited W Withdrawn					Charlie Baker	Jay Gonzalez
1	October 9, 2018	WSBK-TV	Jon Keller		P	P
2	October 17, 2018	WGBH-TV	Jim Braude; Margery Eagan		P	P
3	November 1, 2018	WCVB-TV		WCVB-TV	P	P

=== Endorsements ===
All individuals belong to the nominee's party unless otherwise specified.

Charlie Baker

State legislators

- Christopher Markey, state representative (D)
- David Nangle, state representative (D)

Local officials

- Brian Arrigo, mayor of Revere (D)
- Bill Carpenter, mayor of Brockton (I)
- Dave Conway, Lowell city councilor
- Jasiel Correia, mayor of Fall River (D)
- Stephen DiNatale, mayor of Fitchburg (D)
- Scott Galvin, mayor of Woburn (D)
- Ken Gray, mayor of Amesbury
- Mark Hawke, mayor of Gardner
- Bob Hedlund, mayor of Weymouth
- Donna Holaday, mayor of Newburyport (D)
- Tom Koch, mayor of Quincy (I)
- Richard Kos, mayor of Chicopee
- John Leahy, Lowell city councilor
- William Martin, mayor of Greenfield (I)
- Dean Mazzarella, mayor of Leominster (I)
- Rita Mercier, Lowell city councilor
- Will Reichelt, mayor of West Springfield (I)
- Daniel Rivera, mayor of Lawrence (D)
- Bill Samaras, mayor of Lowell (D)
- William Sapelli, mayor of Agawam (I)
- Domenic Sarno, mayor of Springfield (D)
- Brian Sullivan, mayor of Westfield (D)
- Joe Sullivan, mayor of Braintree (D)
- Sefatia Romeo Theken, mayor of Gloucester (I)
- Arthur Vigeant, mayor of Marlborough

Organizations

- Everytown for Gun Safety

Newspapers

- The Berkshire Eagle
- The Boston Globe
- Boston Herald
- Cape Cod Times
- The Chelsea Record
- The Daily News of Newburyport
- The Eagle-Tribune
- Gloucester Daily Times
- The Republican
- The Salem News
- Sentinel & Enterprise
- The Sun
- Telegram & Gazette
Jay Gonzalez

Former U.S. executive branch officials

- Barack Obama, 44th president of the United States

State elected officials

- Suzanne Bump, auditor of Massachusetts
- Steve Grossman, former treasurer and receiver-general of Massachusetts and former chairman of the Democratic National Committee

State legislators

- William Brownsberger, state senator
- Harriette Chandler, state senate president emerita
- Julian Cyr, state senator
- Daniel Donahue, state representative
- Jamie Eldridge, state senator
- Tricia Farley-Bouvier, state representative
- Dylan Fernandes, state representative
- Sean Garballey, state representative
- Anne Gobi, state senator
- Natalie Higgins, state representative
- Mary Keefe, state representative
- Eric Lesser, state senator
- Barbara L'Italien, state senator
- John Mahoney, state representative
- Paul Mark, state representative
- Michael O. Moore, state senator
- James O'Day, state representative
- Sarah Peake, state representative
- John Scibak, state representative
- Paul Tucker, state representative

Local elected officials

- Dante Comparetto, Worcester School Committee member
- Khrystian King, Worcester city councilor
- John Krol, Pittsfield City Council member
- Molly McCullough, Worcester School Committee member
- Candy F. Mero-Carlson, Worcester city councilor
- Helen Moon, Pittsfield City Council member
- Sean Rose, Worcester city councilor
- Michelle Wu, at-large Boston city councilor, former Boston City Council president

Individuals

- Kate Donaghue, DNC and Massachusetts DSC Member
- Bob Massie, Gonzalez's opponent in the Democratic primary for governor

Labor unions

- National Association of Government Employees

Organizations

- Massachusetts Democratic Party
- Progressive Democrats of Massachusetts

=== Predictions ===
Source	Ranking	As of
The Cook Political Report	Safe R	October 26, 2018
The Washington Post	Likely R	November 5, 2018
FiveThirtyEight	Safe R	November 5, 2018
Rothenberg Political Report	Safe R	November 1, 2018
Sabato's Crystal Ball	Safe R	November 5, 2018
RealClearPolitics	Safe R	November 4, 2018
Daily Kos	Safe R	November 5, 2018
Fox News (Note: The Fox News Midterm Power Rankings uniquely does not contain a category for Safe/Solid races.)	Likely R	November 5, 2018
Politico	Safe R	November 5, 2018
Governing	Safe R	November 5, 2018

=== Polling ===
Poll source	Date(s) administered	Sample size	Margin of error	Charlie Baker (R)	Jay Gonzalez (D)	Other	Undecided
MassINC	October 25–28, 2018	502	± 4.4%	68%	25%	2%	2%
Suffolk University	October 24–28, 2018	500	± 4.4%	65%	26%	–	8%
Western New England University	October 10–27, 2018	402 LV	± 5.0%	65%	27%	–	7%
Western New England University	October 10–27, 2018	485 RV	± 4.0%	64%	25%	–	10%
UMass Lowell	October 1–7, 2018	485 LV	± 5.6%	66%	27%	5%	3%
UMass Lowell	October 1–7, 2018	791 RV	± 4.4%	65%	26%	6%	2%
MassINC	September 17–21, 2018	506	± 4.4%	68%	24%	1%	6%
Suffolk University	September 13–17, 2018	500	± 4.4%	55%	28%	–	17%
Suffolk University	June 8–12, 2018	500	± 4.4%	52%	22%	–	25%
MassINC	May 22–26, 2018	501	± 4.4%	60%	20%	1%	19%
MassINC	March 16–18, 2018	504	± 4.4%	60%	21%	2%	15%
MassINC	November 9–12, 2017	503	± 4.4%	59%	19%	3%	18%
MassINC	June 19–22, 2017	504	± 4.4%	55%	22%	1%	20%

Hypothetical polling

with Setti Warren

Poll source	Date(s) administered	Sample size	Margin of error	Charlie Baker (R)	Setti Warren (D)	Other	Undecided
MassINC	March 16–18, 2018	504	± 4.4%	58%	24%	3%	13%
MassINC	November 9–12, 2017	504	± 4.4%	58%	24%	2%	15%
MassINC	June 19–22, 2017	504	± 4.4%	53%	26%	1%	17%
UMass Amherst	September 15–20, 2016	400	± 4.1%	40%	17%	–	36%

with Katherine Clark

Poll source	Date(s) administered	Sample size	Margin of error	Charlie Baker (R)	Katherine Clark (D)	Undecided
UMass Amherst	September 15–20, 2016	400	± 4.1%	39%	24%	31%

with Maura Healey

Poll source	Date(s) administered	Sample size	Margin of error	Charlie Baker (R)	Maura Healey (D)	Undecided
MassINC	June 19–22, 2017	504	± 4.4%	48%	36%	13%
UMass Amherst	September 15–20, 2016	400	± 4.1%	43%	25%	29%
Gravis Marketing	July 12–13, 2016	901	± 3.3%	56%	30%	14%

with Joseph P. Kennedy III

Poll source	Date(s) administered	Sample size	Margin of error	Charlie Baker (R)	Joseph P. Kennedy III (D)	Undecided
UMass Amherst	September 15–20, 2016	400	± 4.1%	33%	33%	29%
Gravis Marketing	July 12–13, 2016	901	± 3.3%	50%	38%	12%

with Bob Massie

Poll source	Date(s) administered	Sample size	Margin of error	Charlie Baker (R)	Bob Massie (D)	Other	Undecided
Suffolk University	June 8–12, 2018	500	± 4.4%	54%	21%	–	25%
MassINC	May 22–26, 2018	501	± 4.4%	60%	20%	1%	17%
MassINC	March 16–18, 2018	504	± 4.4%	59%	22%	2%	16%
MassINC	November 9–12, 2017	504	± 4.4%	60%	21%	2%	16%
MassINC	June 19–22, 2017	504	± 4.4%	55%	25%	1%	17%

with Seth Moulton

Poll source	Date(s) administered	Sample size	Margin of error	Charlie Baker (R)	Seth Moulton (D)	Undecided
UMass Amherst	September 15–20, 2016	400	± 4.1%	39%	21%	34%

with Marty Walsh

Poll source	Date(s) administered	Sample size	Margin of error	Charlie Baker (R)	Marty Walsh (D)	Undecided
UMass Amherst	September 15–20, 2016	400	± 4.1%	37%	28%	32%

=== Results ===
Massachusetts gubernatorial election, 2018
Party	Candidate	Votes	%	±%
Republican	Charlie Baker (incumbent)	1,781,341	66.60%	▲18.20
Democratic	Jay Gonzalez	885,770	33.12%	▼13.42
Write-in		7,504	0.28%	▲0.19
Total votes		2,674,615	100.00%	N/A
Republican hold				

==== By county ====
2018 United States gubernatorial election in Massachusetts (by county)
County	Baker %	Baker #	Gonzalez %	Gonzalez #	Others %	Others #	Total #
Barnstable	73.74%	85,726	25.95%	30,169	0.31%	359	116,254
Berkshire	53.03%	28,331	46.85%	25,030	0.13%	67	53,428
Bristol	70.76%	132,371	29.02%	54,280	0.23%	423	187,074
Dukes	55.38%	5,556	44.55%	4,470	0.07%	7	10,033
Essex	71.44%	219,522	28.28%	86,893	0.28%	854	307,269
Franklin	55.67%	18,263	44.22%	14,507	0.11%	35	32,805
Hampden	71.27%	109,952	28.39%	43,806	0.34%	521	154,279
Hampshire	53.22%	37,272	46.64%	32,667	0.14%	97	70,036
Middlesex	62.42%	411,687	37.33%	246,197	0.25%	1,621	659,505
Nantucket	57.57%	2,388	42.19%	1,750	0.24%	10	4,148
Norfolk	69.07%	209,318	30.59%	92,709	0.34%	1,018	303,045
Plymouth	74.92%	164,438	24.74%	54,303	0.34%	745	219,486
Suffolk	50.45%	125,247	49.24%	122,249	0.31%	763	248,259
Worcester	74.85%	231,270	24.84%	76,740	0.32%	984	308,994

Counties that flipped from Democratic to Republican

- Berkshire (largest municipality: Pittsfield)
- Dukes (largest municipality: Oak Bluffs)
- Franklin (largest municipality: Greenfield)
- Hampshire (largest municipality: Amherst)
- Middlesex (largest municipality: Cambridge)
- Nantucket
- Suffolk (largest municipality: Boston)

==== By congressional district ====
Baker won eight of nine congressional districts, all of which elected Democrats.

District	Baker	Gonzalez	Representative
1st	67%	33%	Richard Neal
2nd	69%	31%	Jim McGovern
3rd	71%	29%	Niki Tsongas (114th Congress)
3rd	71%	29%	Lori Trahan (115th Congress)
4th	69%	30%	Joe Kennedy III
5th	60%	40%	Katherine Clark
6th	73%	26%	Seth Moulton
7th	44%	56%	Ayanna Pressley
8th	68%	31%	Stephen Lynch
9th	73%	27%	Bill Keating

== See also ==
- 2017–2018 Massachusetts legislature
