= Danillo Sena =

American politician

Dan Sena
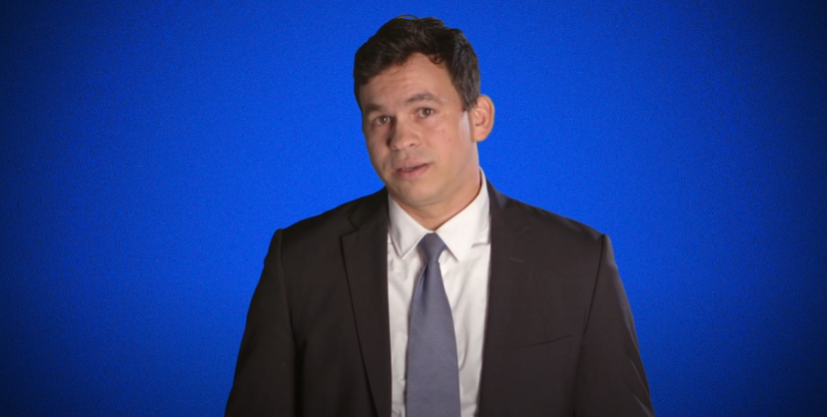

Member of the Massachusetts House of Representatives from the 37th Middlesex district
- Incumbent
- Assumed office June 10, 2020
- Preceded by: Jen Benson

Personal details
- Born: Danillo A. Sena; September 7, 1986 (age 40) Timbaúba, Brazil
- Party: Democratic
- Spouse: Danith "Melinda" Yim
- Children: Juliana; Leonardo
- Parent: Eronides Sena (mother)
- Education: Acton-Boxborough Regional High School
- Alma mater: Middlesex Community College (AA); University of Massachusetts Amherst (BA)
- Website: Campaign website

Danillo A. Sena is an American politician who is the member of the Massachusetts House of Representatives from the 37th Middlesex district. He was elected in a special election on June 2, 2020, against Republican Cathy Clark. The election was held to replace former Representative Jen Benson, who resigned back in January 2020 to become the new President of the Alliance for Business Leadership.

== Early life and education ==
Sena was born to a Roman Catholic family in Timbaúba, Brazil, and immigrated to Acton, Massachusetts as a 14-year-old in 2001. He is a recipient of Deferred Action for Childhood Arrivals.

He earned Bachelor of Arts degree in political science from University of Massachusetts Amherst in 2019.

== Career ==
He worked for State Senator Jamie Eldridge as a district director and legislative liaison for six years.

=== Massachusetts House of Representatives ===
Sena is the first Brazilian immigrant to be elected to a state legislature in United States.

He is a member of the Massachusetts Black and Latino Legislative Caucus and also Joint Committee on Advanced Information Technology, the Internet and Cybersecurity, Consumer Protection and Professional Licensure, Education and also Public Safety and Homeland Security.

== Personal life and family ==
Sena received a green card and became a citizen in 2018 at the age of 31. He is married to Yim, who is a Cambodian refugee, and together they have two children – Juliana and Leonardo.

== See also ==
- 2019–2020 Massachusetts legislature
- 2021–2022 Massachusetts legislature
