= 2014 Massachusetts gubernatorial election =

- November 4, 2014
- Turnout: 51.62% ▼3.19
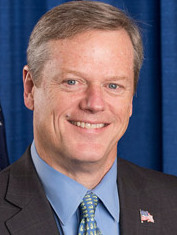

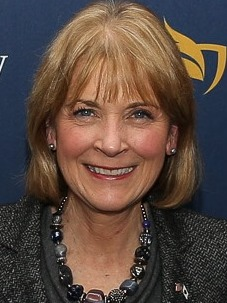
Nominee	Charlie Baker	Martha Coakley
Party	Republican	Democratic
Running mate	Karyn Polito	Steve Kerrigan
Popular vote	1,044,573	1,004,408
Percentage	48.40%	46.54%
- Baker: 40–50% 50–60% 60–70% 70–80% Coakley: 40–50% 50–60% 60–70% 70–80% 80–90% >90% Tie: 40–50%
Governor before election
Deval Patrick
Democratic
Elected Governor
Charlie Baker
Republican

The 2014 Massachusetts gubernatorial election took place on November 4, 2014, to elect the governor of Massachusetts, concurrently with the election of Massachusetts's Class II U.S. Senate seat, other elections to the United States Senate in other states, elections to the United States House of Representatives, and various state and local elections.

Incumbent Democratic Governor Deval Patrick was eligible to seek a third term but stated in January 2011 that he would not run for re-election. The office of lieutenant governor had been vacant since the resignation of Tim Murray in June 2013.

Primary elections for governor and lieutenant governor were conducted separately on September 9, 2014: the Democrats nominated Massachusetts Attorney General Martha Coakley and former CEO of the Democratic National Convention Steve Kerrigan, and the Republicans nominated former state cabinet secretary and 2010 gubernatorial nominee Charlie Baker and former state representative Karyn Polito.

Baker defeated Coakley and three other candidates in the general election. This was the second time in four years that Coakley, despite running as a Democrat in one of the most Democratic-leaning states in the union, lost a statewide election to a Republican. This was her final attempt at winning public office. This election, as of 2026, was the last Massachusetts gubernatorial election where the winning candidate did not both win every county and at least 63% of the vote.

== Democratic primary ==
=== Governor ===
==== Candidates ====
- Donald Berwick, former administrator of the Centers for Medicare and Medicaid Services and CEO of the Institute for Healthcare Improvement
- Martha Coakley, attorney general of Massachusetts and nominee for U.S. Senate in 2010
- Steven Grossman, treasurer and receiver-general of Massachusetts, former chairman of the Democratic National Committee and Massachusetts Democratic Party

===== Eliminated at convention =====
- Joseph Avellone, executive at PAREXEL, former COO of Blue Cross Blue Shield of Massachusetts and former chairman of the Wellesley board of selectmen
- Juliette Kayyem, former assistant U.S. secretary of Homeland Security

===== Withdrew =====
- Dan Wolf, state senator from Harwich and CEO of Cape Air

===== Declined =====
- Suzanne M. Bump, Massachusetts state auditor (ran for re-election)
- Mike Capuano, U.S. representative from Somerville and candidate for U.S. Senate in 2010 (ran for re-election)
- Mo Cowan, former U.S. senator
- Joseph Curtatone, mayor of Somerville
- Robert DeLeo, speaker of the Massachusetts House of Representatives
- Barney Frank, former U.S. representative
- Therese Murray, president of the Massachusetts Senate
- Tim Murray, former lieutenant governor of Massachusetts and former mayor of Worcester
- Carmen Ortiz, U.S. attorney for the District of Massachusetts
- Deval Patrick, incumbent governor of Massachusetts
- Rick Sullivan, chief of staff to Governor Deval Patrick and former secretary of Energy and Environmental Affairs and mayor of Westfield

==== Endorsements ====
Joe Avellone

Individuals

- Morris A. Bergman, Worcester city councilor
- Kevin F. Coughlin, Quincy city councilor
- Noel DiBona, Quincy school committeeman
- Anthony J. Economou, Worcester city councilor
- Christine Fagan, Taunton school committee member
- John Gilis, Norfolk County commissioner
- Douglas S. Gutro, Quincy city councilor
- Sherry Costa Hanlon, Taunton city councilor
- Tom Hoye, mayor of Taunton
- Tim McCarthy, Boston city councilor
- Patrick McDermott, Norfolk County register of probate
- Ray Mitchell, Fall River city councilor
- Alice Peisch, state representative
- Joseph Petty, mayor of Worcester
- Sarai Rivera, Worcester city councilor
- Jass Stewart, Brockton city councilor
- Kathleen M. Toomey, Worcester city councilor
Don Berwick

Individuals

- Daniel E. Bosley, former state representative
- Sonia Chang-Díaz, state senator
- Paul Demakis, former state representative
- Ken Donnelly, state senator
- James Eldridge, state senator
- Paul Farmer, co-founder of Partners in Health
- Marshall Ganz, grassroots organizer
- Atul Gawande, surgeon and public health researcher at Brigham and Women's Hospital
- Rosanne Haggerty, founder of Common Ground (New York City)
- Patricia Jehlen, state senator
- John Kitzhaber, governor of Oregon
- Jay Livingstone, state representative
- John E. McDonough, former state representative
- Patrick O. Murphy, former mayor of Lowell
- Bill Owens, former state senator
- Denise Provost, state representative
- Susan Tucker, former state senator and state representative
- Dan Wolf, state senator and CEO of Cape Air

Organizations

- Jamaica Plain Progressives
- Mass-Care
- Progressive Democrats of Massachusetts
- Progressive Massachusetts

Newspapers

- Blue Mass Group
- Cape Cod Today
- DigBoston
- The MetroWest Daily News
Martha Coakley

Individuals

- Katherine Clark, U.S. representative
- Sean Curran, state representative
- Ray Jordan, vice-chair of the Massachusetts Democratic Party
- Barbara F. Lee, philanthropist and political activist
- Zaida Luna, Springfield Ward 1 city councilor
- Alex Morse, mayor of Holyoke
- Therese Murray, president of the Massachusetts Senate
- Benjamin Swan, state representative
- Bud L. Williams, Springfield city councilor at large

Organizations

- EMILY's List
- MassEquality
- Planned Parenthood

Labor unions

- 1199SEIU United Healthcare Workers East
- International Brotherhood of Electrical Workers (IBEW) 103
- Massachusetts Coalition of Police
- Massachusetts Police Association
- New England Regional Council of Carpenters
- Painters & Allied Trades District Council #35
- Sheet Metal Workers Local 63
- Utility Workers Union of America (UWUA) 369

Newspapers

- The Rainbow Times
Steve Grossman

Individuals

- Michael Ashe, sheriff of Hampden County
- Ted Bettencourt, mayor of Peabody
- Harriette L. Chandler, state senator
- Howard Dean, former governor of Vermont, former chair of the Democratic National Committee, and candidate for president in 2004
- Sal DiDomenico, state senator
- Michael O. Moore, state senator
- David Narkewicz, mayor of Northampton
- Stan Rosenberg, majority leader of the Massachusetts Senate
- Domenic Sarno, mayor of Springfield
- Micky Ward, former WBU champion professional boxer

Organizations

- Pipefitters Local 537

Newspapers

- The Boston Globe

==== Debate ====
2014 Massachusetts gubernatorial election Democratic primary debate
No.	Date	Host	Moderator	Link	Democratic	Democratic	Democratic	Democratic	Democratic
Key: P Participant A Absent N Not invited I Invited W Withdrawn									
Key: P Participant A Absent N Not invited I Invited W Withdrawn					Joseph Avellone	Donald Berwick	Martha Coakley	Steven Grossman	Juliette Kayyem
1	January 29, 2014		Jim Madigan		**P**	**P**	**P**	**P**	**P**

==== Polling ====
Poll source	Date(s) administered	Sample size	Margin of error	Joseph Avellone	Donald Berwick	Martha Coakley	Steven Grossman	Juliette Kayyem	Dan Wolf	Other	Undecided
WBUR/MassINC	September 2–7, 2014	234	± 6.4%	—	12%	41%	20%	—	—	1%	27%
Boston Globe	September 2–3, 2014	400	± 4.8%	—	13%	47%	25%	—	—	—	14%
UMass Lowell	August 25–31, 2014	685	± 4.55%	—	9%	52%	20%	—	—	—	19%
WBUR/MassINC	August 24–31, 2014	340	± 5.3%	—	6%	47%	23%	—	—	<1%	24%
Boston Globe	August 17–19 & 24–26, 2014	361	± 5.2%	—	10%	46%	24%	—	—	—	21%
Suffolk	August 21–24, 2014	400	± 4.9%	—	15.75%	42.25%	30%	—	—	—	12%
Boston Globe	August 10–12 & 17–19, 2014	358	± 5.2%	—	10%	45%	24%	—	—	—	21%
Boston Globe	August 3–5 & 10–12, 2014	357	± 5.2%	—	10%	45%	21%	—	—	—	24%
Boston Globe	July 27–29 & August 3–5, 2014	361	± 5.2%	—	9%	45%	18%	—	—	—	28%
Boston Globe	July 20–22 & 27–29, 2014	369	± 5.1%	—	5%	45%	20%	—	—	—	30%
Boston Globe	July 13–15 & 20–22, 2014	374	± 5.1%	—	5%	46%	18%	—	—	—	30%
Boston Globe	July 7–8 & 13–15, 2014	362	± 5.1%	—	6%	50%	16%	—	—	—	28%
Boston Globe	June 29–July 1 & 7–8, 2014	365	± 5.1%	—	5%	53%	17%	—	—	—	26%
Boston Globe	June 22–24 & 29–July 1, 2014	373	± ?	—	6%	52%	18%	—	—	—	24%
Boston Globe	June 15–17 & 22–24, 2014	392	± ?	—	8%	52%	19%	—	—	—	21%
Boston Globe	June 8–10 & 15–17, 2014	198	± ?	—	8%	52%	19%	—	—	—	21%
Boston Globe	June 1–3 & 8–10, 2014	442	± 4.7%	2%	3%	49%	14%	3%	—	—	30%
Suffolk University	June 4–7, 2014	450	± 4.6%	1.78%	4%	44%	12%	2.44%	—	—	35.77%
WBUR/MassINC	May 16–18, 2014	262	± 6.1%	1%	3%	51%	7%	4%	—	1%	32%
UMass	March 31–April 6, 2014	156	± ?	—	3%	39%	9%	3%	—	2%	**44%**
WBUR/MassINC	March 14–16, 2014	237	± ?	1%	4%	45%	14%	2%	—	2%	32%
Suffolk University	January 29–February 3, 2014	309	± 4%	0.97%	0.97%	56.31%	10.68%	4.21%	—	—	26.86%
Public Policy Polling	September 20–23, 2013	324	± 5.4%	4%	6%	57%	10%	2%	3%	—	17%

Hypothetical polling

With Capuano and Coakley

Poll source	Date(s) administered	Sample size	Margin of error	Joseph Avellone	Donald Berwick	Mike Capuano	Martha Coakley	Steven Grossman	Juliette Kayyem	Dan Wolf	Undecided
Public Policy Polling	September 20–23, 2013	324	± 5.4%	8%	4%	21%	**41%**	9%	1%	2%	13%

Without Coakley

Poll source	Date(s) administered	Sample size	Margin of error	Joseph Avellone	Donald Berwick	Mike Capuano	Mo Cowan	William Galvin	Steven Grossman	Carmen Ortiz	Undecided
Public Policy Polling	May 1–2, 2013	666	± 3.9%	5%	4%	**17%**	4%	13%	6%	5%	**44%**

With Coakley and Murray

Poll source	Date(s) administered	Sample size	Margin of error	Suzanne Bump	Martha Coakley	Steven Grossman	Tim Murray	Setti Warren	Other	Undecided
Suffolk University	May 20–22, 2012	600	± 4.1%	3%	**35%**	11%	13%	6%	10%	23%
Suffolk University	February 11–15, 2012	600	± 4.1%	1%	**43%**	7%	11%	8%	15%	16%

==== Results ====
Democratic convention vote
Party	Candidate	Votes	%
**Democratic**	**Steve Grossman**	**1,547**	**35.2**
**Democratic**	**Martha Coakley**	**1,024**	**23.3**
**Democratic**	**Donald Berwick**	**972**	**22.1**
Democratic	Juliette Kayyem	535	12.1
Democratic	Joseph Avellone	311	7.1
Total votes		**4,389**	**100**

Bold denotes candidate met the minimum threshold of fifteen percent to appear on the primary ballot.

Primary results by municipality

Democratic primary results
Party	Candidate	Votes	%
**Democratic**	**Martha Coakley**	**229,156**	**42.4**
Democratic	Steve Grossman	196,594	36.4
Democratic	Donald Berwick	113,988	21.1
Democratic	Other	995	0.2
Democratic	Blank votes	15,359	
Total votes		**556,092**	**100.00**

=== Lieutenant governor ===
==== Candidates ====
===== Declared =====
- Leland Cheung, Cambridge city councilor and board member of the Massachusetts Technology Collaborative
- Steve Kerrigan, former CEO of the Democratic National Convention
- Michael Lake, candidate for state auditor in 2010

===== Eliminated at convention =====
- James Arena-DeRosa, former United States Department of Agriculture administrator

===== Withdrew =====
- Jonathan Edwards, Whately selectman

==== Polling ====
Poll source	Date(s) administered	Sample size	Margin of error	James Arena-DeRosa	Leland Cheung	Jonathan Edwards	Stephen Kerrigan	Michael Lake	Other	Undecided
Boston Globe	September 2–3, 2014	400	± 4.8%	—	7%	—	23%	9%	—	60%
UMass Lowell	August 25–31, 2014	685	± 4.55%	—	10%	—	24%	10%	—	57%
Boston Globe	August 17–19 & 24–26, 2014	361	± 5.2%	—	5%	—	14%	7%	—	74%
Suffolk	August 21–24, 2014	400	± 4.9%	—	8.75%	—	9.5%	9%	—	72.75%
Boston Globe	August 10–12 & 17–19, 2014	358	± 5.2%	—	7%	—	12%	5%	—	75%
Boston Globe	June 1–3 & 8–10, 2014	442	± 4.7%	3%	**5%**	—	5%	3%	—	85%
Suffolk	June 4–7, 2014	450	± 4.6%	0.89%	**4%**	—	4%	2.67%	—	88.44%
Suffolk	January 29–February 3, 2014	309	± ?	1.94%	4.53%	3.56	5.5%	2.27%	—	82.2%

==== Results ====
Democratic convention vote
Party	Candidate	Votes	%
**Democratic**	**Steve Kerrigan**	**1,625**	**37.6**
**Democratic**	**Michael Lake**	**1,529**	**35.4**
**Democratic**	**Leland Cheung**	**695**	**16.2**
Democratic	James Arena-DeRosa	460	10.6
Total votes		**4,304**	**100**

Bold denotes candidate met the minimum threshold of 15 percent to appear on the primary ballot

Democratic primary results
Party	Candidate	Votes	%
**Democratic**	**Steve Kerrigan**	**222,562**	**50.7**
Democratic	Leland Cheung	128,645	29.3
Democratic	Michael Lake	86,006	19.6
Democratic	All Others	1,435	0.3
Democratic	Blank Votes	117,444	
Total votes		**556,092**	**100**

== Republican primary ==
=== Governor ===
==== Candidates ====
- Charlie Baker, former state cabinet secretary and nominee for governor in 2010
- Mark Fisher, businessman and Tea Party activist

===== Declined =====
- Scott Brown, former U.S. senator (ran for U.S. Senate in New Hampshire)
- Gabriel E. Gomez, nominee for U.S. Senate in 2013
- Karyn Polito, former state representative and nominee for state treasurer in 2010 (running for lieutenant governor)
- Richard Tisei, former state senate minority leader, nominee for lieutenant governor in 2010 and nominee for U.S. representative in 2012 (ran for U.S. representative)
- William Weld, former governor
- Daniel Winslow, former state representative and candidate for U.S. Senate in 2013

==== Campaign ====
At the Republican State Convention on March 22, 2014, Baker received 2,095 votes (82.708%), businessman and Tea Party activist Mark Fisher received 374 votes (14.765%), and there were 64 blank votes (2.527%). The threshold for making the ballot is 15%, and the party announced that Baker had thus received the nomination without the need for a primary election. However, Fisher argued that according to the convention rules, blank votes are not counted for the purposes of determining the winner, and that he thus received 15.148%, enough to make the ballot. He sued the Massachusetts Republican State Committee, and his case was due to be heard in Suffolk Superior Court between May 2 and June 18.

The committee's lawyer, Louis M. Ciavarra, said that in negotiations with the committee, Fisher declined their offer of being placed on the ballot, and instead asked for $1 million in return for dropping the suit. Ciavarra said that after it was pointed out to Fisher and his representatives that this would be illegal, they allegedly lowered their request to $650,000. Fisher's lawyer, Thomas M. Harvey, has confirmed that Fisher had asked for $1 million, which he called a "starting point", saying that Fisher should be "compensated" for his efforts, in addition to receiving a place on the ballot. He later said that the request for $650,000 was "still negotiable" and added that "you don't ask for what you expect". Fisher himself has denied asking for a "payoff", instead saying that party officials had offered him a "bribe" in December 2013 in return for dropping out. He refused to say who made the offer, claiming to have been under a gag order, though no such order existed. He said that he only asked for $1 million during the negotiations because he had been asked for a figure and it was the sum that he claimed the party had offered to him. He further denied the claim that he had offered to withdraw in exchange for the money, saying that he wanted a place on the ballot, for the State Committee to release the "tally sheets" which he claims show that he rightfully won a place on the ballot, and to be reimbursed $100,000 in damages: for the cost of legal fees and of collecting signatures to make the ballot by petition.

On May 9, 2014, a week into the case, Judge Douglas Wilkins accepted the State Committee's offer to certify Fisher on the primary ballot and put off the expedited June 16 trial date. The State Committee had not at that point turned over the "tally sheets" and the judge did not order them to do so, instead inviting Fisher's attorneys to submit an amended complaint. The State Committee also asked that the trial, discovery and deliberation over damages be postponed until after the election. The judge did not rule on that request, but he did rule that the other portions of Fisher's complaint would proceed at a later date, with no need for an expedited trial before the primary.

A debate was held between Baker and Fisher on August 21. They clashed on jobs, gun control and higher education. Baker called for "constructive friction" in electing him governor to counterbalance the Democratic-controlled General Court and said that he would "clean up the regulatory morass, control spending [and] reduce taxes." Fisher criticised the rise in food stamps, rising cost of entitlement programmes and illegal immigration. In the primary election on September 9, Baker defeated Fisher 116,004 votes (74.1%) to 40,240 (25.7%). In February 2015, Fisher settled with the State Party for $240,000. Executive Director Brian Wynne said that despite the settlement, the Party denied his accusations and said that the settlement was forced on them because of mounting legal costs.

==== Polling ====
Poll source	Date(s) administered	Sample size	Margin of error	Charlie Baker	Mark Fisher	Other	Undecided
WBUR/MassINC	August 24–31, 2014	340	± 5.3%	59%	7%	<1%	33%
Suffolk University	August 21–24, 2014	400	± 4.9%	70.25%	11.25%	—	17.75%
Suffolk University	June 4–7, 2014	202	± 6.9%	63.37%	4.95%	—	30.20%
Suffolk University	January 29–February 3, 2014	162	± 4%	63.58%	10.49%	—	25.31%

==== Results ====
Municipal results of the Republican primary for the 2014 Massachusetts gubernatorial election

Republican primary results
Party	Candidate	Votes	%
Republican	Charlie Baker	116,004	74.1
Republican	Mark Fisher	40,240	25.7
Republican	All Others	336	0.2
Republican	Blank Votes	30,327	
Total votes		159,936	100

=== Lieutenant governor ===
==== Candidates ====
- Karyn Polito, former state representative and nominee for treasurer and receiver-general of Massachusetts in 2010

== Independents and third parties ==
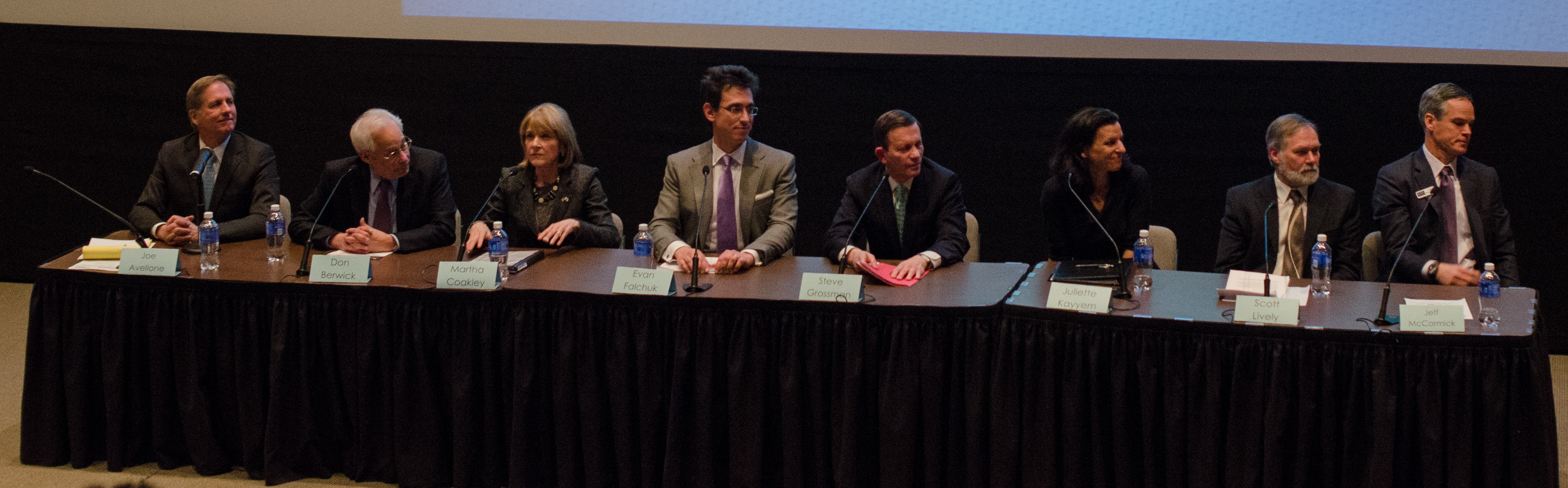
Participants at the MassEquality/WGBH 2014 Gubernatorial Forum on LBGTQ equality in Boston, March 25, 2014. From left to right: Joe Avellone, Don Berwick, Martha Coakley, Evan Falchuk, Steve Grossman, Juliette Kayyem, Scott Lively, Jeff McCormick.

=== Candidates ===
==== Declared ====
- Evan Falchuk, healthcare executive, attorney and founder of the United Independent Party

- Running mate: Angus Jennings, professional planner/consultant

- Scott Lively, evangelical pastor

- Running mate: Shelly Saunders

- Jeff McCormick, co-founder and managing partner of venture capital firm Saturn Partners

- Running mate: Tracy Post, member of the Yarmouth Board of Selectmen

== General election ==
=== Debates ===
2014 Massachusetts gubernatorial election debates
No.	Date	Host	Moderator	Link	Republican	Democratic	United Independent	Independent	Independent
Key: P Participant A Absent N Not invited I Invited W Withdrawn									
Key: P Participant A Absent N Not invited I Invited W Withdrawn					Charlie Baker	Martha Coakley	Evan Falchuk	Scott Lively	Jeff McCormick
1	October 7, 2014	WBZ-TV	Jon Keller		P	P	P	P	P
2	October 21, 2014	WGBH-TV	Jim Braude; Margery Eagan		P	P	N	N	N
3	October 27, 2014	New England Cable News; Telegram & Gazette	Latoyia Edwards		P	P	N	N	N

=== Predictions ===
Source	Ranking	As of
The Cook Political Report	Tossup	November 3, 2014
Sabato's Crystal Ball	Lean R (flip)	November 3, 2014
Rothenberg Political Report	Tilt R (flip)	November 3, 2014
Real Clear Politics	Tossup	November 3, 2014

=== Polling ===
View source data.

Poll source	Date(s) administered	Sample size	Margin of error	Martha Coakley (D)	Charlie Baker (R)	Evan Falchuk (UIP)	Scott Lively (I)	Jeff McCormick (I)	Other	Undecided
Public Policy Polling	October 30–November 2, 2014	887	± 3.3%	42%	46%	3%	3%	1%	—	6%
Public Policy Polling	October 30–November 2, 2014	887	± 3.3%	47%	48%	—	—	—	—	5%
WNEU	October 21–30, 2014	430 LV	± 5%	41%	46%	3%	1%	1%	—	8%
WNEU	October 21–30, 2014	522 RV	± 4%	40%	41%	4%	2%	1%	—	12%
Suffolk University	October 27–29, 2014	500	± 4.4%	43%	46%	3%	1%	2%	—	6%
Boston Globe	October 26–29, 2014	600	± 4%	37%	44%	4%	2%	1%	—	11%
Emerson College	October 26–29, 2014	627	± 3.85%	42%	48%	4%	—	—	6%	
Umass Amherst	October 20–27, 2014	591 LV	± 4.4%	47%	44%	3%	2%	2%	<1%	3%
Umass Amherst	October 20–27, 2014	800 RV	± 3.8%	47%	41%	3%	2%	3%	<1%	3%
WBUR/MassINC	October 22–25, 2014	494	± 4.4%	42%	43%	4%	2%	1%	1%	8%
UMass Lowell	October 21–25, 2014	601 LV	± 4.5%	41%	45%	3%	1%	2%	8%	
UMass Lowell	October 21–25, 2014	1,001 RV	± 3.6%	42%	38%	2%	1%	2%	15%	
CBS News/NYT/YouGov	October 16–23, 2014	2,218	± 3%	45%	41%	—	—	—	1%	13%
GreenbergQuinlanRosner	October 20–22, 2014	611	± 4%	45%	44%	—	—	—	5%	5%
Boston Globe	October 19–22, 2014	500	± 4.4%	36%	45%	3%	2%	2%	—	11%
WBUR/MassINC	October 15–18, 2014	501	± 4.4%	42%	43%	1%	1%	2%	<1%	10%
Rasmussen Reports	October 13–14, 2014	980	± 3%	46%	48%	—	—	—	2%	5%
Boston Globe	October 12–14, 2014	400	± 4.9%	41%	41%	3%	3%	2%	—	10%
WBUR/MassINC	October 8–11, 2014	500	± 4.4%	42%	39%	2%	1%	2%	0%	14%
Emerson College	October 7, 2014	500	± 4.3%	39%	45%	—	—	—	16%	
Boston Globe	October 5–7, 2014	400	± 4.9%	39%	34%	3%	2%	2%	—	20%
WBUR/MassINC	October 1–4, 2014	504	± 4.4%	41%	39%	2%	2%	1%	1%	14%
Umass Amherst	September 26–October 2, 2014	414 LV	± 5.5%	48%	44%	2%	2%	2%	0%	2%
Umass Amherst	September 26–October 2, 2014	600 RV	± 4.6%	48%	41%	2%	3%	3%	<1%	3%
CBS News/NYT/YouGov	September 20–October 1, 2014	2,389	± 2%	47%	41%	—	—	—	1%	11%
Boston Globe	September 28–30, 2014	401	± 4.89%	36%	39%	2%	1%	1%	—	21%
Suffolk University	September 25–28, 2014	500	± 4.4%	44%	43%	2%	0%	2%	—	9%
WNEU	September 20–28, 2014	416 LV	± 5%	43%	44%	2%	1%	2%	—	8%
WNEU	September 20–28, 2014	536 RV	± 4%	40%	41%	2%	2%	3%	—	12%
WBUR/MassINC	September 24–27, 2014	503	± 4.4%	44%	41%	1%	1%	2%	>1%	11%
Boston Globe	September 21–23, 2014	400	± 4.9%	38%	40%	2%	1%	2%	—	18%
Umass Amherst	September 19–23, 2014	440 LV	± ?	45%	46%	2%	2%	2%	<1%	2%
Umass Amherst	September 19–23, 2014	600 RV	± 4.4%	47%	42%	2%	3%	3%	<1%	3%
WBUR/MassINC	September 16–21, 2014	502	± 4.4%	46%	36%	2%	1%	1%	1%	13%
Rasmussen Reports	September 16–17, 2014	750	± 4%	42%	42%	—	—	—	5%	10%
Boston Globe	September 14–16, 2014	407	± 4.85%	39%	36%	2%	3%	1%	—	19%
WBUR/MassINC	September 11–14, 2014	504	± 4.4%	44%	35%	<1%	1%	2%	1%	16%
WBUR/MassINC	September 2–7, 2014	500	± 4.4%	39%	34%	1%	1%	1%	2%	21%
CBS News/NYT/YouGov	August 18–September 2, 2014	3,361	± 2%	43%	35%	—	—	—	6%	16%
WBUR/MassINC	August 24–31, 2014	700	± 3.7%	40%	31%	1%	1%	2%	2%	22%
UMass Lowell	August 25–31, 2014	1,624	± 2.94%	41%	32%	1%	—	7%	—	20%
Boston Globe	August 17–19 & 24–26, 2014	605	± 4%	37%	38%	2%	—	5%	—	18%
Boston Globe	August 10–12 & 17–19, 2014	605	± 4%	41%	34%	2%	—	6%	—	18%
Boston Globe	August 3–5 & 10–12, 2014	606	± 4%	40%	32%	1%	—	6%	—	21%
Boston Globe	July 27–29 & August 3–5, 2014	605	± 4%	42%	31%	2%	—	5%	—	21%
MassINC	July 28–August 3, 2014	388	± ?	44%	41%	—	—	—	—	15%
Boston Globe	July 20–22 & 27–29, 2014	601	± 4%	42%	32%	2%	—	5%	—	19%
CBS News/NYT/YouGov	July 5–24, 2014	1,899	± 4.9%	51%	36%	—	—	—	4%	8%
Boston Globe	July 13–15 & 20–22, 2014	625	± 3.9%	38%	33%	1%	—	8%	—	19%
Boston Globe	July 7–8 & 13–15, 2014	605	± 4%	39%	36%	1%	—	7%	—	16%
Boston Globe	June 29–July 1 & 7–8, 2014	604	± 4%	40%	35%	2%	—	6%	—	18%
Boston Globe	June 22–24 & 29–July 1, 2014	601	± 4%	40%	31%	2%	—	6%	—	22%
WBUR/MassINC	June 27–29, 2014	502	± 4.4%	41%	28%	2%	1%	2%	2%	22%
Boston Globe	June 15–17 & 22–24, 2014	604	± 3.9%	41%	30%	1%	—	7%	—	21%
Boston Globe	June 8–10 & 15–17, 2014	630	± 3.9%	43%	30%	0%	—	6%	—	20%
Boston Globe	June 1–3 & 8–10, 2014	697	± 3.7%	42%	31%	1%	—	6%	—	20%
Suffolk University	June 4–7, 2014	800	± 3.5%	36%	29%	1%	1%	2%	—	32%
Boston Globe	May 29–June 3, 2014	602	± 4%	37%	32%	2%	—	7%	—	22%
WBUR/MassINC	May 16–18, 2014	504	± 4.4%	39%	30%	1%	—	3%	1%	25%
WNEU	March 31–April 7, 2014	477	± 5%	54%	25%	3%	—	3%	—	15%
UMass Amherst	March 31–April 6, 2014	500	± 5.9%	45%	34%	—	—	—	—	21%
WBUR/MassINC	March 14–16, 2014	500	± 4.4%	41%	26%	1%	—	1%	3%	27%
Suffolk University	January 29–February 3, 2014	600	± 4%	44%	31%	1%	1%	2%	—	21%
Purple Strategies	January 21–23, 2014	500	± 4.4%	46%	36%	—	—	—	—	18%
WBUR/MassINC	January 16–19, 2014	504	± 4.4%	39%	29%	1%	—	3%	2%	26%
WNEU	October 1–7, 2013	431	± ?%	54%	34%	—	—	—	—	12%
Public Policy Polling	September 20–23, 2013	616	± 4%	51%	38%	—	—	—	—	11%
Public Policy Polling	June 22–24, 2012	902	± 3.3%	47%	34%	—	—	—	—	19%
Public Policy Polling	March 16–18, 2012	936	± 3.2%	49%	29%	—	—	—	—	22%

Hypothetical polling

With Avellone

Poll source	Date(s) administered	Sample size	Margin of error	Joseph Avellone (D)	Charlie Baker (R)	Other	Undecided
Boston Globe	June 1–3 & 8–10, 2014	697	± 3.7%	19%	36%	9%	37%
Suffolk University	June 4–7, 2014	800	± 3.5%	17%	30%	5%	49%
Boston Globe	May 29–June 3, 2014	602	± 4%	17%	36%	11%	36%
Suffolk University	January 29–February 3, 2014	600	± 4%	19%	38%	5%	39%
WBUR/MassINC	January 16–19, 2014	504	± 4.4%	13%	36%	12%	39%
Public Policy Polling	September 20–23, 2013	616	± 4%	30%	40%	—	30%
Public Policy Polling	May 1–2, 2013	1,539	± 2.5%	24%	33%	—	43%

Poll source	Date(s) administered	Sample size	Margin of error	Joseph Avellone (D)	Scott Brown (R)	Other	Undecided
Public Policy Polling	May 1–2, 2013	1,539	± 2.5%	29%	46%	—	24%

Poll source	Date(s) administered	Sample size	Margin of error	Joseph Avellone (D)	Mark Fisher (R)	Other	Undecided
Suffolk University	January 29–February 3, 2014	600	± 4%	21.83%	19.33%	7.17%	51.66%

Poll source	Date(s) administered	Sample size	Margin of error	Joseph Avellone (D)	Richard Tisei (R)	Other	Undecided
Public Policy Polling	May 1–2, 2013	1,539	± 2.5%	29%	25%	—	46%

With Berwick

Poll source	Date(s) administered	Sample size	Margin of error	Donald Berwick (D)	Charlie Baker (R)	Other	Undecided
WBUR/MassINC	September 2–7, 2014	500	± 4.4%	18%	39%	10%	33%
WBUR/MassINC	August 24–31, 2014	700	± 3.7%	19%	37%	10%	33%
Boston Globe	August 17–19 & 24–26, 2014	605	± 4%	19%	44%	8%	29%
Boston Globe	August 10–12 & 17–19, 2014	605	± 4%	22%	40%	8%	30%
Boston Globe	August 3–5 & 10–12, 2014	606	± 4%	22%	37%	7%	33%
Boston Globe	July 27–29 & August 3–5, 2014	605	± 4%	23%	36%	7%	34%
Boston Globe	July 20–22 & 27–29, 2014	601	± 4%	24%	37%	8%	30%
Boston Globe	July 13–15 & 20–22, 2014	625	± 3.9%	20%	41%	11%	28%
Boston Globe	July 7–8 & 13–15, 2014	605	± 4%	18%	42%	12%	29%
Boston Globe	June 29–July 1 & 7–8, 2014	604	± 4%	17%	40%	11%	32%
Boston Globe	June 22–24 & 29–July 1, 2014	601	± 4%	17%	37%	11%	35%
WBUR/MassINC	June 27–29, 2014	502	± 4.4%	19%	31%	14%	38%
Boston Globe	June 15–17 & 22–24, 2014	604	± 3.9%	19%	37%	10%	35%
Boston Globe	June 8–10 & 15–17, 2014	630	± 3.9%	20%	36%	7%	36%
Boston Globe	June 1–3 & 8–10, 2014	697	± 3.7%	20%	36%	8%	36%
Suffolk University	June 4–7, 2014	800	± 3.5%	18.63%	29.63%	4.76%	47.01%
Boston Globe	May 29–June 3, 2014	602	± 4%	18%	37%	11%	35%
WBUR/MassINC	May 16–18, 2014	504	± 4.4%	16%	35%	11%	39%
UMass Amherst	March 31–April 6, 2014	500	± 5.9%	29%	32%	—	39%
WBUR/MassINC	March 14–16, 2014	500	± 4.4%	17%	36%	7%	40%
Suffolk University	January 29–February 3, 2014	600	± 4%	18.5%	38.33%	5.33%	37.84%
WBUR/MassINC	January 16–19, 2014	504	± 4.4%	13%	36%	12%	40%
Public Policy Polling	September 20–23, 2013	616	± 4%	31%	38%	—	31%
Public Policy Polling	May 1–2, 2013	1,539	± 2.5%	25%	35%	—	41%

Poll source	Date(s) administered	Sample size	Margin of error	Donald Berwick (D)	Scott Brown (R)	Other	Undecided
Public Policy Polling	January 29–30, 2013	763	± 3.6%	32%	49%	—	19%

Poll source	Date(s) administered	Sample size	Margin of error	Donald Berwick (D)	Mark Fisher (R)	Other	Undecided
WBUR/MassINC	June 27–29, 2014	502	± 4.4%	21%	14%	18%	48%
Suffolk University	January 29–February 3, 2014	600	± 4%	21.17%	19.17%	7.5%	47.33%

Poll source	Date(s) administered	Sample size	Margin of error	Donald Berwick (D)	Richard Tisei (R)	Other	Undecided
Public Policy Polling	May 1–2, 2013	1,539	± 2.5%	28%	24%	—	48%

With Capuano

Poll source	Date(s) administered	Sample size	Margin of error	Mike Capuano (D)	Charlie Baker (R)	Other	Undecided
Public Policy Polling	September 20–23, 2013	616	± 4%	42%	37%	—	21%
UMass Amherst	May 30–June 4, 2013	500	± 5.4%	36%	24%	—	40%
Public Policy Polling	May 1–2, 2013	1,539	± 2.5%	35%	33%	—	32%

Poll source	Date(s) administered	Sample size	Margin of error	Mike Capuano (D)	Scott Brown (R)	Other	Undecided
UMass Amherst	May 30–June 4, 2013	500	± 5.4%	33%	45%	—	22%
Public Policy Polling	May 1–2, 2013	1,539	± 2.5%	38%	45%	—	17%

Poll source	Date(s) administered	Sample size	Margin of error	Mike Capuano (D)	Richard Tisei (R)	Other	Undecided
UMass Amherst	May 30–June 4, 2013	500	± 5.4%	40%	20%	—	40%
Public Policy Polling	May 1–2, 2013	1,539	± 2.5%	38%	24%	—	39%

With Coakley

Poll source	Date(s) administered	Sample size	Margin of error	Martha Coakley (D)	Mark Fisher (R)	Other	Undecided
WBUR/MassINC	June 27–29, 2014	502	± 4.4%	43%	13%	14%	30%
Suffolk University	January 29–February 3, 2014	600	± 4%	48.67%	16.33%	5%	30%
Purple Strategies	January 21–23, 2014	500	± 4.4%	50%	30%	—	20%

With Cowan

Poll source	Date(s) administered	Sample size	Margin of error	Mo Cowan (D)	Charlie Baker (R)	Other	Undecided
Public Policy Polling	May 1–2, 2013	1,539	± 2.5%	26%	33%	—	41%

Poll source	Date(s) administered	Sample size	Margin of error	Mo Cowan (D)	Scott Brown (R)	Other	Undecided
Public Policy Polling	May 1–2, 2013	1,539	± 2.5%	31%	48%	—	21%

Poll source	Date(s) administered	Sample size	Margin of error	Mo Cowan (D)	Richard Tisei (R)	Other	Undecided
Public Policy Polling	May 1–2, 2013	1,539	± 2.5%	30%	25%	—	45%

With Galvin

Poll source	Date(s) administered	Sample size	Margin of error	William F. Galvin (D)	Charlie Baker (R)	Other	Undecided
Public Policy Polling	May 1–2, 2013	1,539	± 2.5%	37%	31%	—	33%

Poll source	Date(s) administered	Sample size	Margin of error	William F. Galvin (D)	Scott Brown (R)	Other	Undecided
Public Policy Polling	May 1–2, 2013	1,539	± 2.5%	39%	43%	—	19%

Poll source	Date(s) administered	Sample size	Margin of error	William F. Galvin (D)	Richard Tisei (R)	Other	Undecided
Public Policy Polling	May 1–2, 2013	1,539	± 2.5%	39%	24%	—	27%

With Grossman

Poll source	Date(s) administered	Sample size	Margin of error	Steven Grossman (D)	Charlie Baker (R)	Other	Undecided
WBUR/MassINC	September 2–7, 2014	500	± 4.4%	28%	34%	7%	30%
UMass Lowell	August 25–31, 2014	1,624	± 2.94%	31%	33%	10%	27%
WBUR/MassINC	August 24–31, 2014	700	± 3.7%	29%	34%	6%	31%
Boston Globe	August 17–19 & 24–26, 2014	605	± 4%	33%	37%	7%	22%
Boston Globe	August 10–12 & 17–19, 2014	605	± 4%	32%	34%	7%	26%
Boston Globe	August 3–5 & 10–12, 2014	606	± 4%	29%	32%	8%	31%
Boston Globe	July 27–29 & August 3–5, 2014	605	± 4%	30%	31%	8%	31%
MassINC	July 28–August 3, 2014	388	± ?	39%	35%	—	25%
Boston Globe	July 20–22 & 27–29, 2014	601	± 4%	29%	34%	9%	28%
Boston Globe	July 13–15 & 20–22, 2014	625	± 3.9%	27%	37%	10%	26%
Boston Globe	July 7–8 & 13–15, 2014	605	± 4%	19%	37%	9%	25%
Boston Globe	June 29–July 1 & 7–8, 2014	604	± 4%	27%	36%	9%	29%
Boston Globe	June 22–24 & 29–July 1, 2014	601	± 4%	26%	34%	9%	31%
WBUR/MassINC	June 27–29, 2014	502	± 4.4%	28%	30%	11%	30%
Boston Globe	June 15–17 & 22–24, 2014	604	± 3.9%	28%	31%	9%	32%
Boston Globe	June 8–10 & 15–17, 2014	630	± 3.9%	27%	30%	8%	35%
Boston Globe	June 1–3 & 8–10, 2014	697	± 3.7%	28%	31%	8%	33%
Suffolk University	June 4–7, 2014	800	± 3.5%	24.25%	26.5%	4.01%	45.25%
Boston Globe	May 29–June 3, 2014	602	± 4%	26%	32%	10%	31%
WBUR/MassINC	May 16–18, 2014	504	± 4.4%	25%	33%	8%	34%
WNEU	March 31–April 7, 2014	477	± 5%	38%	29%	13%	20%
UMass Amherst	March 31–April 6, 2014	500	± 5.9%	35%	29%	—	36%
WBUR/MassINC	March 14–16, 2014	500	± 4.4%	24%	32%	8%	36%
Suffolk University	January 29–February 3, 2014	600	± 4%	28.33%	33.33%	6%	32.33%
Purple Strategies	January 21–23, 2014	500	± 4.4%	34%	35%	—	31%
WBUR/MassINC	January 16–19, 2014	504	± 4.4%	23%	33%	8%	36%
WNEU	October 1–7, 2013	431	± ?%	43%	30%	—	27%
Public Policy Polling	September 20–23, 2013	616	± 4%	38%	37%	—	25%
UMass Amherst	May 30–June 4, 2013	500	± 5.4%	27%	26%	—	47%
Public Policy Polling	May 1–2, 2013	1,539	± 2.5%	32%	31%	—	37%
Public Policy Polling	June 22–24, 2012	902	± 3.3%	36%	34%	—	27%
Public Policy Polling	March 16–18, 2012	936	± 3.2%	37%	30%	—	33%

Poll source	Date(s) administered	Sample size	Margin of error	Steven Grossman (D)	Scott Brown (R)	Other	Undecided
UMass Amherst	May 30–June 4, 2013	500	± 5.4%	26%	55%	—	19%
Public Policy Polling	May 1–2, 2013	1,539	± 2.5%	34%	46%	—	19%
Public Policy Polling	January 29–30, 2013	763	± 3.6%	37%	48%	—	15%

Poll source	Date(s) administered	Sample size	Margin of error	Steven Grossman (D)	Mark Fisher (R)	Other	Undecided
WBUR/MassINC	June 27–29, 2014	502	± 4.4%	31%	15%	17%	38%
Suffolk University	January 29–February 3, 2014	600	± 4%	35.33%	17.17%	6%	41.5%
Purple Strategies	January 21–23, 2014	500	± 4.4%	35%	26%	—	38%

Poll source	Date(s) administered	Sample size	Margin of error	Steven Grossman (D)	Richard Tisei (R)	Other	Undecided
UMass Amherst	May 30–June 4, 2013	500	± 5.4%	27%	26%	—	47%
Public Policy Polling	May 1–2, 2013	1,539	± 2.5%	34%	25%	—	41%
Public Policy Polling	January 29–30, 2013	763	± 3.6%	37%	48%	—	15%

With Kayyem

Poll source	Date(s) administered	Sample size	Margin of error	Juliette Kayyem (D)	Charlie Baker (R)	Other	Undecided
Boston Globe	June 1–3 & 8–10, 2014	697	± 3.7%	20%	36%	8%	36%
Suffolk University	June 4–7, 2014	800	± 3.5%	20%	28%	4.51%	47.5%
Boston Globe	May 29–June 3, 2014	602	± 4%	20%	36%	9%	36%
WBUR/MassINC	May 16–18, 2014	504	± 4.4%	17%	36%	9%	38%
UMass Amherst	March 31–April 6, 2014	500	± 5.9%	32%	32%	—	36%
WBUR/MassINC	March 14–16, 2014	500	± 4.4%	19%	34%	8%	39%
Suffolk University	January 29–February 3, 2014	600	± 4%	19%	36.83%	5.67%	38.5%
WBUR/MassINC	January 16–19, 2014	504	± 4.4%	15%	37%	10%	38%
Public Policy Polling	September 20–23, 2013	616	± 4%	31%	38%	—	31%

Poll source	Date(s) administered	Sample size	Margin of error	Juliette Kayyem (D)	Mark Fisher (R)	Other	Undecided
Suffolk University	January 29–February 3, 2014	600	± 4%	24.33%	19.17%	6.83%	49.66%

With Kennedy

Poll source	Date(s) administered	Sample size	Margin of error	Joseph P. Kennedy II (D)	Charlie Baker (R)	Other	Undecided
UMass Amherst	May 30–June 4, 2013	500	± 5.4%	48%	25%	—	27%

Poll source	Date(s) administered	Sample size	Margin of error	Joseph P. Kennedy II (D)	Scott Brown (R)	Other	Undecided
UMass Amherst	May 30–June 4, 2013	500	± 5.4%	41%	42%	—	17%

Poll source	Date(s) administered	Sample size	Margin of error	Joseph P. Kennedy II (D)	Richard Tisei (R)	Other	Undecided
UMass Amherst	May 30–June 4, 2013	500	± 5.4%	40%	33%	—	27%

With Murray

Poll source	Date(s) administered	Sample size	Margin of error	Tim Murray (D)	Charlie Baker (R)	Other	Undecided
Public Policy Polling	June 22–24, 2012	902	± 3.3%	36%	37%	—	27%
Public Policy Polling	March 16–18, 2012	936	± 3.2%	37%	32%	—	31%

With Ortiz

Poll source	Date(s) administered	Sample size	Margin of error	Carmen Ortiz (D)	Charlie Baker (R)	Other	Undecided
Public Policy Polling	May 1–2, 2013	1,539	± 2.5%	27%	35%	—	38%

Poll source	Date(s) administered	Sample size	Margin of error	Carmen Ortiz (D)	Scott Brown (R)	Other	Undecided
Public Policy Polling	May 1–2, 2013	1,539	± 2.5%	31%	49%	—	20%
Public Policy Polling	January 29–30, 2012	763	± 3.6%	32%	49%	—	19%

Poll source	Date(s) administered	Sample size	Margin of error	Carmen Ortiz (D)	Richard Tisei (R)	Other	Undecided
Public Policy Polling	May 1–2, 2013	1,539	± 2.5%	29%	27%	—	44%

With Wolf

Poll source	Date(s) administered	Sample size	Margin of error	Dan Wolf (D)	Charlie Baker (R)	Other	Undecided
Public Policy Polling	September 20–23, 2013	616	± 4%	31%	37%	—	31%

=== Results ===

Massachusetts gubernatorial election, 2014
Party	Candidate	Votes	%	±%
Republican	Charlie Baker	1,044,573	48.40%	+6.40%
Democratic	Martha Coakley	1,004,408	46.54%	−1.88%
United Independent	Evan Falchuk	71,814	3.33%	N/A
Independent	Scott Lively	19,378	0.90%	N/A
Independent	Jeff McCormick	16,295	0.75%	N/A
Write-in		1,858	0.09%	-0.02%
Total votes		2,158,326	100.00%	N/A
	Blank	28,463		
Turnout		2,186,789		
Republican gain from Democratic				

==== By county ====
2014 United States gubernatorial election in Massachusetts (by county)
County	Baker %	Baker #	Coakley %	Coakley #	Others %	Others #	Total #
Barnstable	53.44%	52,251	42.47%	41,525	4.09%	4,003	97,779
Berkshire	28.31%	11,201	66.23%	26,207	5.46%	2,151	39,559
Bristol	49.70%	72,641	45.19%	66,045	5.11%	7,471	146,157
Dukes	34.14%	2,493	61.30%	4,477	4.56%	333	7,303
Essex	52.97%	135,365	42.95%	109,776	4.08%	10,429	255,570
Franklin	33.55%	8,826	57.31%	15,077	9.16%	2,407	26,310
Hampden	48.13%	64,850	40.64%	54,751	11.23%	15,128	134,729
Hampshire	34.77%	19,103	56.38%	30,982	8.85%	4,863	54,948
Middlesex	45.42%	238,750	50.28%	264,319	4.29%	22,602	525,671
Nantucket	46.66%	1,717	49.38%	1,817	3.96%	146	3,680
Norfolk	52.97%	133,328	42.86%	107,891	4.17%	10,503	251,722
Plymouth	57.21%	102,551	38.01%	68,141	4.78%	8,562	179,254
Suffolk	31.81%	57,754	64.22%	116,610	3.97%	7,219	181,583
Worcester	56.58%	143,743	38.10%	96,790	5.32%	13,518	254,051

Counties that flipped from Democratic to Republican

- Bristol (largest municipality: New Bedford)
- Hampden (largest municipality: Springfield)

==== By congressional district ====
Baker won six of nine congressional districts, which all elected Democrats.

District	Coakley	Baker	Representative
1st	46%	45%	Richard Neal
2nd	43%	51%	Jim McGovern
3rd	43%	52%	Niki Tsongas
4th	44%	52%	Joe Kennedy III
5th	53%	43%	Katherine Clark
6th	41%	55%	John Tierney
6th	41%	55%	Seth Moulton
7th	71%	25%	Mike Capuano
8th	44%	52%	Stephen Lynch
9th	42%	53%	Bill Keating

== See also ==
- 2014 Massachusetts general election
- 2013–2014 Massachusetts legislature
- 2014 United States gubernatorial elections
