= Jennifer Benson =

American politician

Member of the Massachusetts House of Representatives from the 37th Middlesex district
- In office January 7, 2009 – January 8, 2020
- Preceded by: Jamie Eldridge
- Succeeded by: Danillo Sena

Personal details
- Born: Rochester, NH
- Party: Democratic
- Education: Florida Atlantic University (BA); Harvard Kennedy School (MPA)
- Occupation: Massachusetts State Director AARP

Jennifer E. Benson is an American former state legislator who served in the Massachusetts House of Representatives for the 37th Middlesex District from January 2009 until January 2020, when she resigned to become President of Alliance for Business Leadership. Benson led ABL for 3 years, resigning in December 2022 to become a consultant for the renewable energy industry until June 2024 when she became the Director of AARP Massachusetts. She lived in Lunenburg, MA for 28 years serving not only as State Representative, but also as member and Chair of the Lunenburg School Committee. She is currently a Watertown resident.
