= Dan Wolf =

American politician and pilot (born 1957)

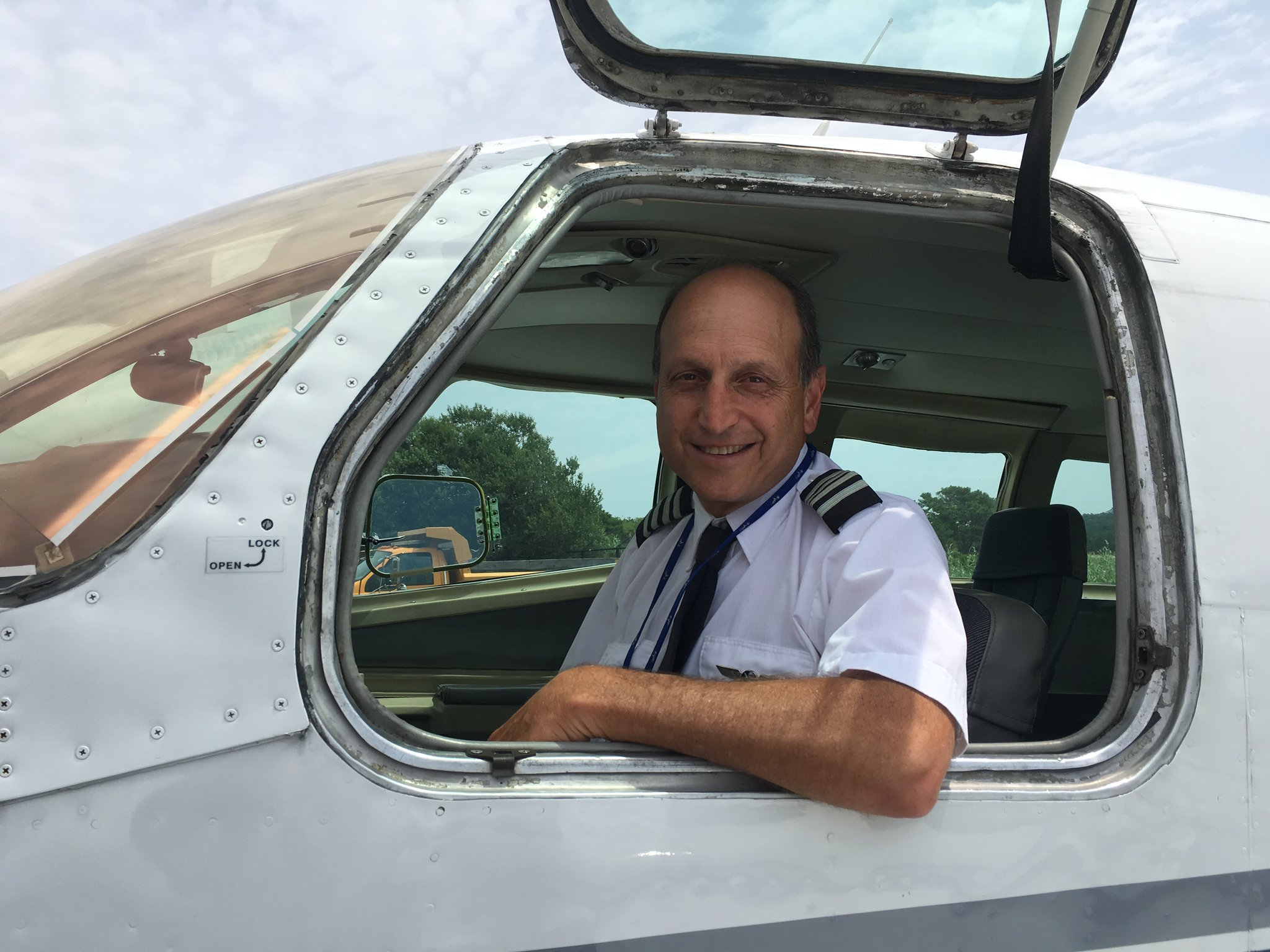
- Dan Wolf in 2017

Member of the Massachusetts Senate from the Cape and Islands district
- In office January 5, 2011 – January 4, 2017
- Preceded by: Robert O'Leary
- Succeeded by: Julian Cyr

Personal details
- Born: Daniel A. Wolf; August 11, 1957 (age 69) Philadelphia, Pennsylvania
- Party: Democratic
- Education: Wesleyan University (BA)
- Profession: businessman, entrepreneur, aircraft pilot
- Positions: Board Chairman of Cape Air

Daniel A. Wolf (born August 11, 1957) is an American entrepreneur, aircraft pilot, and politician. In 1989, he founded the Cape Cod-based airline Cape Air, which originally flew between Provincetown and Boston in Massachusetts, and has since expanded internationally. In 2010, he was elected to the Massachusetts Senate to represent the Cape and Islands district. He ran unopposed in 2012, and was re-elected to a third term in 2014. During his tenure, he emerged as a progressive leader in the Senate, advocating for renewable energy, increased minimum wage, and universal health care.

On June 10, 2013, he announced his intention to seek the Democratic nomination for Governor of Massachusetts in the 2014 election. Following an injunction by the State Ethics Commission over his ownership of Cape Air, he announced the suspension of his campaign and his intent to appeal the ruling. Although the Commission eventually ruled in his favor, the nomination process was already well along, and he would eventually run for re-election to the Senate.

In 2015, Wolf confirmed that he would not seek a fourth term in the Massachusetts Senate by running for re-election in 2016. He was succeeded by Julian Cyr (D-Truro). There remains speculation as to whether he will return to focusing on work as owner and pilot for his airline company, although he is considered a potential candidate for Governor in the future.

== Early life and education ==
Wolf was born on August 11, 1957, in Philadelphia, Pennsylvania, and spent summers in Cape Cod, Massachusetts, with his family. He attended Germantown Friends School in Philadelphia, and went on to receive a Bachelor of Arts in political science from Wesleyan University in 1980. After college he earned a degree in Airframe and Power Plant Maintenance at the Quaker School of Aeronautics. He earned a private and commercial pilot's license while working in Boston as a community and union organizer. In the 1980s he was the manager of the Chatham Municipal Airport and worked as a flight instructor before founding Cape Air in 1988.

== Cape Air ==
In 1988 Wolf founded the airline company Cape Air, which at the time flew solely between Boston and Provincetown, Massachusetts. Since flying one route with eight employees and one plane, it has expanded to become the largest independent regionally based airline as of 2013. Cape Air now serves parts of the East Coast, Midwestern United States, the Caribbean, and Micronesia with around 1,000 employees. In 1994, Nantucket Airlines was purchased by and became a subsidiary of Cape Air. Cape Air is an employee-owned company, and the only airline in the United States with a female President as of 2013. While serving in the Massachusetts Senate, Wolf continued to pilot during the summer on weekends.

With assistance from a government grant, Cape Air expanded into Indiana on November 13, 2007, offering flights from Indianapolis to Evansville and South Bend. Because it did not attract the number of passengers needed to be financially successful, the last Cape Air flight in Indiana was on August 31, 2008. In September 2010, the United States Department of Transportation's Essential Air Service (EAS) selected Cape Air to fly a federally subsidized route connecting Augusta, Maine and Boston. Service began in December 2010.

== Massachusetts Senate ==
=== Elections ===
Cape Cod is the primary area Wolf represents in the Senate.

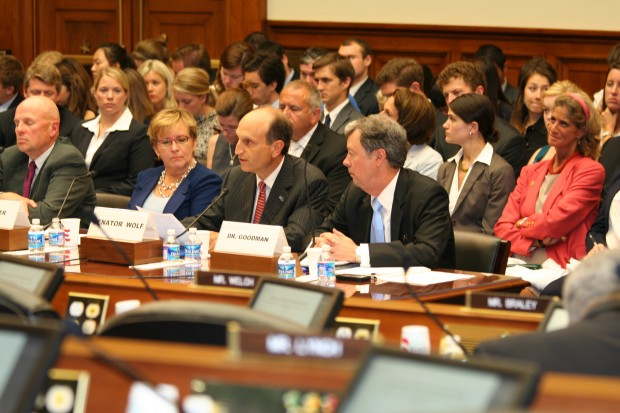
Wolf testifying before the United States House Committee on Oversight and Government Reform.

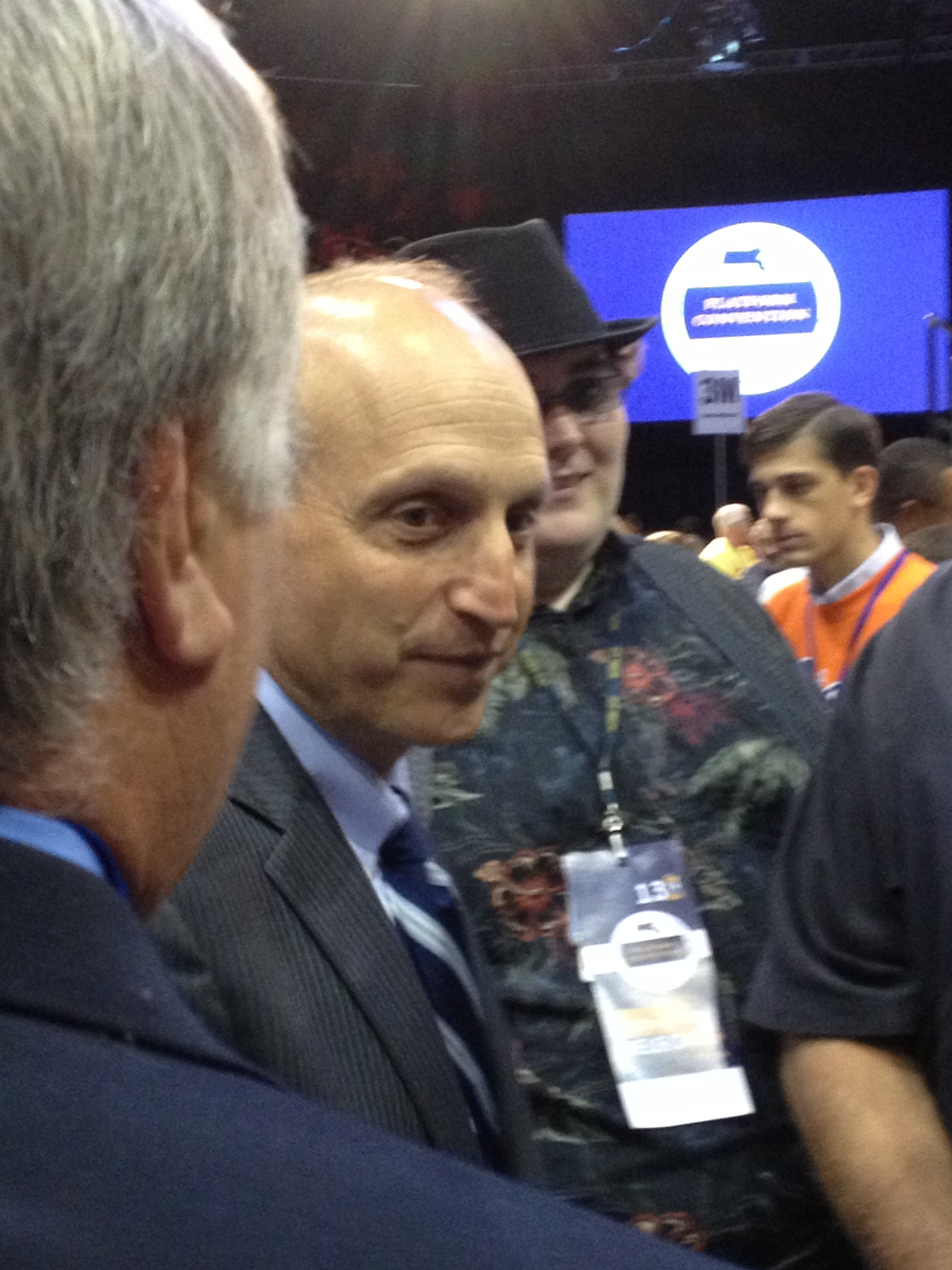
Dan Wolf in 2013

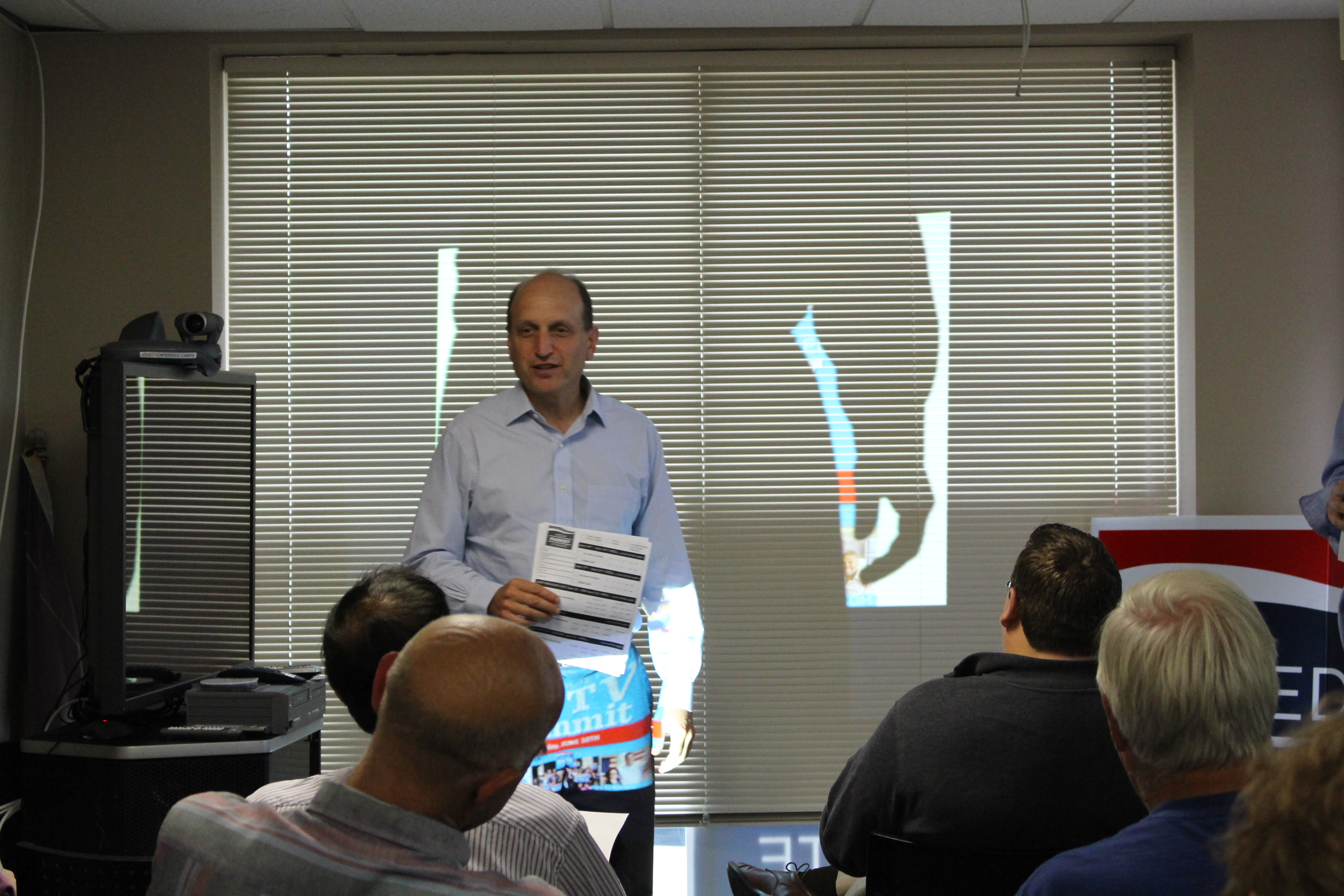
Then State Senator Dan Wolf speaking to a crowd drumming up support for Congressman Ed Markey in Hyannis in 2013

Following incumbent Robert O'Leary's announcement that he would retire to run for the United States House of Representatives, Wolf declared that he would run to succeed him, one month before the deadline. Wolf expressed his motivation for entering politics because he had "become increasingly concerned seeing the challenges through the eyes of [my] front line employees."

His campaign set records for fundraising with a war chest of over $300,000, more than either of his opponents. In the Democratic primary Wolf faced and defeated Barnstable County Commissioner Sheila Lyons with nearly twice as many votes. In the general election Wolf defeated Republican real estate developer James H. Crocker Jr. In his 2012 bid for re-election Wolf faced no competition in either a primary or general election. In 2014 Wolf was re-elected to his third term, defeating Republican Ron Beaty in the general election.

In October 2015, The Boston Globe first reported that Wolf was considering not running for re-election. Weeks later in November, Wolf confirmed that he would remain in office, but would not seek re-election in 2016. Wolf's political aspirations were prodded shortly after handily winning re-election in 2014, though he said he was more focused on serving his constituents than considering future office. After rumors that Wolf would not seek re-election in 2016 to focus on a run for governor in 2018 began circulating, Senate President Stan Rosenberg suggested it was because Wolf wanted to focus more on running his airline company.

=== Tenure ===
Despite being elected from a relatively conservative district, Wolf emerged as a liberal and progressive member of the Senate. During his tenure, Wolf mainly focused on issues such as health care, employee benefits, and middle class economics.

An advocate for universal and single-payer health care, Wolf is a supporter of both Massachusetts health care reform and President Barack Obama's Patient Protection and Affordable Care Act (PPACA). On July 10, 2012, Wolf testified before the United States House Committee on Oversight and Government Reform to discuss the effects of the two laws. Wolf's further statements on the positive aspects of PPACA were eventually cut short by chairman Darrell Issa, a staunch PPACA opponent. Wolf supported a failed amendment in 2012 which would have implemented single-payer health care in Massachusetts if a study proved it was more effective in reducing costs than the state's current model.

Wolf has been a consistent supporter of mandated paid sick days for employees, with his company Cape Air offering paid leave for all employees. Wolf, along with Kay Khan in the House of Representatives, introduced the "2013 Earned Paid Sick Time" bill, which would allow employees to one hour of paid sick leave for every thirty worked. To generate support among other senators, Wolf went so far as to hold a protest with workers' rights activists at a Dunkin' Donuts frequented by legislators. While advocating for the bill in a committee hearing, Wolf admitted "it never occurred to me that there were that many businesses out there that didn't offer this as a benefit," and referred to the experience as "an eye-opener." Although the proposal eventually expired without being passed, for reasons Wolf described as a compromise with the legislature having already passed an incremental minimum wage increase, he campaigned for a ballot measure in 2014 which would mandate universal employee sick time.

As the senator for Cape Cod, Wolf supported Cape Wind, a project to build an offshore wind farm in Nantucket Sound. In 2011, Northeast Energy Efficiency Partnerships praised Wolf's company Cape Air for efficient initiatives such as installing a major solar panel system at their headquarters, expanding office recycling, and distributing compact fluorescent light bulbs to employees.

Wolf has been a vocal critic of the Supreme Court's ruling in Citizens United v. FEC, and published an op-ed piece emphasizing the distinction between people and corporations. Wolf reiterated his opposition to corporate personhood at a breakfast event in his campaign for governor, joking: "Cape Air and my daughters [are about] the same age... I've never actually confused my daughters for Cape Air." A supporter of adopting a constitutional amendment to overturn the Supreme Court decision, Wolf co-sponsored and voted for a resolution to do so. As a guest speaker at a Brookings Institution's summit on Citizens United increase in political spending in 2016, Wolf said a constitutional amendment was vital for changing the political status quo.

Consistently voting to increase the minimum wage, in 2014 Wolf supported a bill eventually signed into law which would reform unemployment insurance and increase Massachusetts' minimum wage to $11 an hour by 2017. In 2015, Wolf joined the Fight for $15 and introduced legislation which would raise the minimum wage to $15 by 2018. In doing so, Wolf acknowledged his "awkward, interesting place," being that the bill would increase wages of commercial employees at airports higher than his airline company, Cape Air, could pay its employees. Wolf has similarly received criticism for Cape Air's participation in the federal Essential Air Service program, which grants millions of dollars in subsidies to airlines in exchange for flying less-profitable routes considered essential.

=== Committee assignments ===
Wolf served on the following committees.

- Joint Committee on Labor and Workforce Development (Chair)
- Senate Committee on Steering and Policy (Chair)
- Joint Committee on Tourism, Arts and Cultural Development
- Joint Committee on Telecommunications, Utilities and Energy
- Joint Committee on Revenue
- Joint Committee on Community Development and Small Businesses

== 2014 gubernatorial campaign ==
On July 10, 2013, Wolf announced his intention to seek the Democratic nomination for Governor of Massachusetts in the 2014 election via a YouTube video. At the 2013 Massachusetts Democratic Convention, Wolf was a keynote speaker, along with other declared gubernatorial candidates: Joseph Avellone, and Donald Berwick. Massachusetts Treasurer Steve Grossman also announced his candidacy at the convention. In his campaign, Wolf focused on his business experience. Wolf has also praised the work of incumbent Governor Deval Patrick and Senator Elizabeth Warren, promising to help grow the middle class. On October 15, he released his case study, The Vision, the Path – A Case Study for the Commonwealth, outlining his plans for Massachusetts regarding proposals for education, health care, and other issues.

Prior to announcing his campaign for governor, Wolf submitted an inquiry to the Massachusetts Ethics Commission as a precaution there would be no conflict of interest. However, on August 2 the Commission ruled that Wolf's 23% ownership of the company did create a conflict because Cape Air had ongoing contracts with the Massachusetts Port Authority (MassPort); Wolf was instructed he would either need to resign from the Senate and discontinue his campaign from Governor, divest his stake in Cape Air, or cancel all contracts between Cape Air and MassPort. In a statement to supporters, explaining that departing his company or canceling contacts would put his employees' jobs at risk, he announced that he would suspend his campaign, and resign from the Senate.

The Ethics Commission later granted his campaign a reprieve, allowing Wolf to make an appeal at their next scheduled meeting on September 19. At the meeting, the Commission ruled 4–1 to reverse its decision which disqualified him from public office, allowing him to remain in office and renew his candidacy for Governor. On October 21, Wolf announced he was ending his campaign for governor, due to the fact that even though the Ethics Commission voted to change its rules, the implementation would have likely taken several months. On June 17, 2014, Wolf endorsed Don Berwick as the Democratic nominee for governor.

== Personal life ==
Wolf is married to Heidi Schuetz, a chef on Cape Cod, and together they have three daughters: Stella, Zoe, and Ruby. In 2010, Wolf was awarded an honorary doctorate from Daniel Webster College.

In March 2013, Wolf was interviewed by New England Cable News (NECN) for their ongoing series "The Boss", speaking about his life and rise to business and political success. Wolf has been a continuing contributor to the Barnstable Patriot. Wolf has served on a number of boards, including the Advisory Council for the Federal Reserve Bank of Boston, the Regional Airline Association, the Cape Cod Business Round Table, the Association for the Preservation of Cape Cod, the Housing Assistance Corporation of Cape Cod, and the Arts Foundation of Cape Cod.
