= Joseph Avellone =

American politician

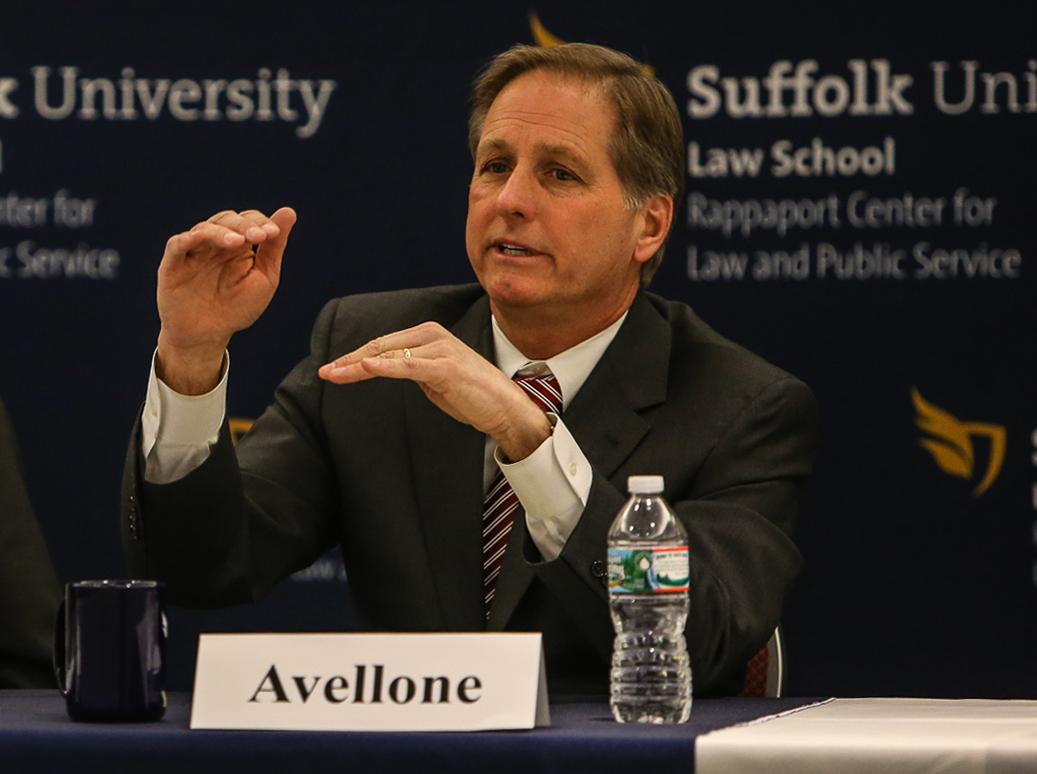
- Avellone at Suffolk University Law School in 2014.

Chair of the Wellesley Board of Selectmen
- In office 1993–1994

Member of the Wellesley Board of Selectmen
- In office 1991–1997

Personal details
- Born: Joseph Charles Avellone III; September 29, 1948 (age 77) Fremont, Ohio, U.S.
- Party: Democratic
- Spouse: Sandra Avellone
- Education: Dartmouth College; Harvard Medical School; John F. Kennedy School of Government
- Website: Campaign website

Military service
- Allegiance: United States
- Branch/service: United States Navy
- Years of service: 1979–1991
- Rank: Lieutenant commander

Joseph Charles "Joe" Avellone III (born September 29, 1948) is an American medical doctor, businessman, and politician from Massachusetts. He was a surgeon at Concord Hospital for four years, selectman for the town of Wellesley, Massachusetts for six years, and was executive vice president for clinical research services at PAREXEL International. He unsuccessfully sought the Democratic nomination for the 2014 Massachusetts gubernatorial election. (He declared his candidacy for Governor of Massachusetts in January, 2013.)

After completing medical school at Harvard, Avellone joined the United States Navy Reserve, earning the rank of lieutenant commander. He later served as health care advisor to Senator Paul Tsongas during the senator's 1992 Presidential Campaign and on the finance committee for then-Senator John Kerry's 2004 Presidential Campaign. Avellone has also worked as a health care executive since 1991, serving in senior roles in several corporations.

== Early life and education ==
Avellone was born in Fremont, Ohio, to Joseph C. Avellone II, a surgeon at Lutheran Hospital in Cleveland, and Patricia Fox Avellone. He has five siblings.

Avellone moved to New Hampshire to pursue a bachelor's degree from Dartmouth College, where he played rugby and was a member of Sigma Alpha Epsilon fraternity. After completing his undergraduate education in 1970, he attended Dartmouth Medical School for two years. He enrolled in Harvard Medical School for his final two years, and went on to earn a master's degree in public administration from the John F. Kennedy School of Government at Harvard.

In 1979, he was named number 3 in Time magazine's 50 Faces for the Future, along with Bill Clinton, Paul Tsongas, and Jesse Jackson.

== Surgical career and military service ==
After graduation from Harvard Medical School, Avellone did his residency at Peter Bent Brigham Hospital, now known as Brigham and Women's Hospital. He went on to work as a surgeon at Concord Hospital in New Hampshire for four years. In 1979, Avellone joined the Navy Reserve as a member of the Medical Corps.

Avellone is board certified in general surgery and is a fellow of the American College of Surgeons.

== Health industry career ==
Following his surgical career, Dr. Avellone has worked as a healthcare executive in the Boston Area. He served as chief operating officer of Blue Cross Blue Shield of Massachusetts for seven years. While at Blue Cross, Avellone headed HMO Blue, a health maintenance organization focused on lowering healthcare costs by limiting fees and coordinating care.

He then worked as CEO of biomedical company Veritas Medicine. In 2007 he began working for PAREXEL International, becoming senior vice president for clinical research in 2010, holding that position until October 1, 2013. He held a small advisory position at PAREXEL.

== Political career ==
=== Early years ===
In 1990, Avellone ran successfully for the board of selectmen in the town of Wellesley, Massachusetts. He was sworn in the following year and won reelection five times. During his third term, he served as chairman of the board of selectmen. Two years after his election, Avellone joined Senator Paul Tsongas' Presidential Campaign as a Healthcare Advisor. He has worked on the Presidential Campaigns of John Kerry, Gary Hart, and Edward Kennedy.

=== 2014 Massachusetts gubernatorial campaign ===
On January 8, 2013, Avellone announced his campaign for Governor of Massachusetts in 2014 when incumbent governor Deval Patrick retires. At the state party convention on June 14, 2014, Avellone failed to receive the 15% of delegate votes required to make the primary ballot.

== Personal life ==
Avellone married Sandy Nabhan in 1975. Joe and Sandy currently live in Wellesley, Massachusetts. They have three children.
