= Steve Kerrigan =

American politician (born 1971)

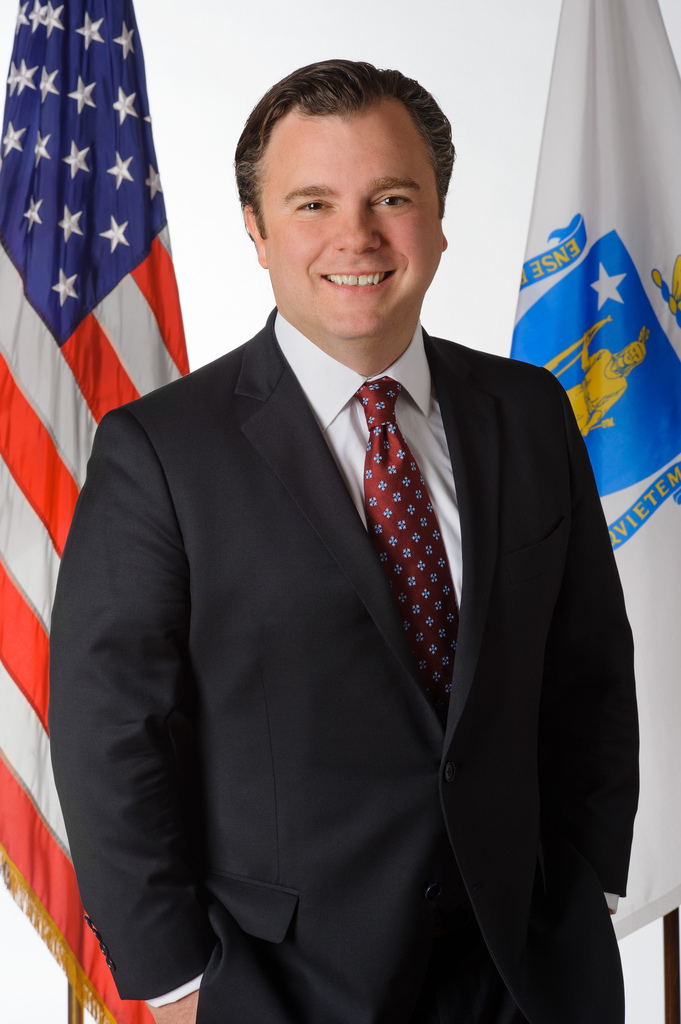

Chair of the Massachusetts Democratic Party
- Incumbent
- Assumed office April 24, 2023
- Preceded by: Gus Bickford

Chief Executive Officer of the Democratic National Convention
- In office 2009–2012
- Preceded by: Leah D. Daughtry
- Succeeded by: Amy Dacey

Personal details
- Born: Stephen Kerrigan; September 17, 1971 (age 55) Lancaster, Massachusetts, U.S.
- Party: Democratic
- Spouse: Jacob Watts (m. 2017)
- Education: University of Maryland, College Park (BS)

Stephen "Steve" Kerrigan is an American political executive who has served as the chair of the Massachusetts Democratic Party since April 2023 and was the Democratic nominee for Lieutenant Governor of Massachusetts in the 2014 election. From 2003 to 2007, Kerrigan served as chief of staff to Massachusetts Attorney General Thomas Reilly, and from 2009 to 2012, CEO of the Democratic National Convention. Kerrigan was also president of the 2013 Presidential Inaugural Committee.

== Early life and education ==
Kerrigan was born and raised in Lancaster, Massachusetts. His father worked as a lineman for the Massachusetts Electrical Company, and his mother served as the Mary Rowlandson Elementary School secretary.

Kerrigan graduated in 1989 from St. John's High School in Shrewsbury, Massachusetts and went on to earn his bachelor's degree from the University of Maryland in 1993.

== Political career ==
=== Aide ===
For more than 10 years, Kerrigan worked in the office of Senator Ted Kennedy. Kerrigan began his work for Senator Kennedy as an intern. Once a member of the Senator's staff, Kerrigan fulfilled the roles of scheduler and constituent services director until becoming the senator's political director, a position he maintained from 1996 to 2003. After his departure, Kerrigan maintained his relationship with the Senator and his family. In 2009 he arranged the Senator's funeral mass in Boston.

From 2003 to 2007, Kerrigan was Massachusetts Attorney General Thomas Reilly's Chief of Staff. He worked on Reilly's unsuccessful 2006 gubernatorial campaign.

=== Democratic Party ===
Kerrigan was chief of staff of Boston's host committee at the 2004 Democratic National Convention.

Kerrigan served as the chief of staff for President Barack Obama's first Presidential Inaugural Committee in 2008. In his role, Kerrigan managed a staff of nearly 450, a $55 million budget and an army of 17,500 volunteers to create the largest event in the history of the United States.

In 2012, Kerrigan was appointed president and chief executive officer (CEO) of the 2013 Presidential Inaugural Committee (PIC). Immediately prior to joining the PIC, Kerrigan served as CEO of the 2012 Democratic National Convention. In his capacity of president and CEO, Kerrigan was responsible for supervising a National Day of Service, President Barack Obama's swearing-in, a parade down Pennsylvania Avenue, and two official balls.

=== Elected office ===
At the age of 24, Kerrigan lost his first race for the Lancaster Board of Selectmen by 26 votes. He was later appointed to the town's finance committee, where he served for two years. Kerrigan then served on the Lancaster Board of Selectmen from 1998 to 2001.

In 2008, Kerrigan challenged incumbent Harold Naughton, Jr. for the 12th Worcester District Massachusetts House of Representatives seat. He lost 3,990 (72%) votes to 1,551 (28%).

In 2017, Kerrigan announced that he would be running for the Massachusetts 3rd Congressional District seat vacated by Niki Tsongas's retirement. He dropped out of the race in February 2018 following the death of his mother.

=== Massachusetts Military Heroes Fund ===
Kerrigan is the president and co-founder of the Massachusetts Military Heroes Fund, a nonprofit organization dedicated to providing support to the families of military service personnel from Massachusetts who lost their lives in service to the United States of America since September 11, 2001.

== Current positions and personal life ==
Kerrigan is President and Chief Executive Officer of the Edward M. Kennedy Community Health Center in Worcester, Massachusetts. He currently lives in his hometown of Lancaster with his husband, Jacob Watts.

On June 13, 2026 Kerrigan was arrested in Southborough, Massachusetts by a local officer who witnessed him crossing marked lanes. He told the officer that he had two beers at 6PM before dinner at a restaurant; a breathalyzer test indicated his blood alcohol content to be 0.089%, exceeding the 0.08% legal limit in Massachusetts. He pleaded to "sufficient facts" in Westborough District Court on June 15 and surrendered his license for 45 days.

== See also ==
- 2014 Massachusetts gubernatorial election

Party political offices
| Preceded by Tim Murray | Democratic nominee for Lieutenant Governor of Massachusetts; 2014 | Succeeded by Quentin Palfrey |
| Preceded by Gus Bickford | Chair of the Massachusetts Democratic Party; 2023–present | Incumbent |
