= United Independent Party =

American political party

- Chairman: Evan Falchuk
- Founded: 2014
- Dissolved: 2017
- Membership (2015): 30,368
- Ideology: Centrism; Social liberalism Modern liberalism
- Political position: Center to center-left
- Colors: Blue & White
- Seats in the Massachusetts Senate: 0 / 40
- Seats in the Massachusetts House: 0 / 160

The United Independent Party or UIP was a political party based in Massachusetts, United States. The chairman of the UIP was Evan Falchuk, a former health care executive who submitted enough signatures to be on the 2014 gubernatorial ballot. When the party and Falchuk announced their intention to run in 2014, it billed itself as pragmatically progressive and fiscally sensible.

The party won more than 3% of the vote in the 2014 gubernatorial ballot and was officially recognized in Massachusetts as a major party, alongside Democrats, Republicans, and the Green-Rainbow Party. Following the 2014 election, the party announced that it would seek to enroll 50,000 Massachusetts residents in the UIP by the end of 2015.

The UIP was spearheading an effort to have a referendum on the Boston bid for the 2024 Summer Olympics before the bid was withdrawn.

In November 2016, the UIP lost official party status in Massachusetts when it failed to get more than 3% of the vote.

In February 2017, party President Evan Falchuk left the UIP and joined the Democratic Party. Without their president or official party status, it was forced to disband. Falchuk hinted that he was leaving the door open for a possible run for governor in 2018 but declined to run.

== History ==
=== Establishment of official party status ===
Founded in 2014 as the United Independent Party, the party attained official political party status in the state of Massachusetts when founder Evan Falchuk ran for the 2014 Massachusetts gubernatorial election as governor. Official political party status in Massachusetts affects how political groups can use finances, and official political parties are guaranteed ballot access. The Falchuk ticket received 3.33% of the vote in Massachusetts, where state law requires 3% during state and national elections for establishing and maintaining official party status. An alternate method to establish and maintain state party status in Massachusetts is to have over 1% of voters registered in their party, a threshold that the UIP never met.

=== 2016 presidential primaries ===
Prior to the 2016 presidential primaries, Massachusetts Secretary of the Commonwealth William F. Galvin stated that officials had noted an "inexplicable increase" in new members of the United Independent Party, especially amongst casual voters who were registering for the first time or online (UIP membership grew from 1,867 in February 2015 to roughly 21,000 by the end the year). Galvin became concerned that many of these voters had accidentally enrolled in the party in the belief that they were registering as "unenrolled", commonly referred to as independent, and would be allowed to vote in either primary. In late January 2016, Galvin sent a letter to the 20,914 enrolled members of the party, informing them that they may have signed up incorrectly. By February 2, about 5,500 had switched from the United Independent Party to unenrolled. According to Falchuk, he had no problem with the letter sent out by the Secretary's office. He also stated that the UIP had also sent out its own emails and even encouraged members to change party identification in order to vote in the primaries and then change back later. Falchuk did take issue with Galvin's statement to WGBH radio, in which he remarked that voters had likely enrolled with the UIP by accident. Falchuk stated that he felt that this was "an elected official using his office not to educate voters ... but rather to say, 'We don't think you should be involved in that party.'" Galvin responded that he had an "obligation to make sure that voters have the ability to vote the way they want to vote... My concern is if these folks, and I'm speaking now particularly the ones who remain in his party and didn't join it intentionally, if they go into the polls on March 1 and try to pull a Democratic or Republican ballot, they won't be able to do it."

=== Loss of official party status ===
The third party needed to register 1% of the state's registered voters, roughly 45,000, as party members before the November election. The party fell short, with 30,368 registered voters as of October 19, according to the party and just-released registration data from the secretary of state's office. The organization will continue to exist, but will be a political designation. The founder of the United Independent Party, Evan Falchuk, said that he and his organization will not disappear.

=== Loss of founder ===
The founder of the United Independent Party of Massachusetts, Evan Falchuk, switched his registration to the Democratic Party in February 2017 saying that "The time to act is too short, the stakes too high, and the rules too skewed, for a third party to lead this fight." This effectively disbanded the party.

== Membership history ==
RV.= Registered Voters

Year	RV.	%	Notes	Ref.
February 2015	1,867			
February 2016	16,476			
November 2016	30,368	.67%	Lost its official party status. Needed 1% or 45,000RV.	

== Election results ==
=== Statewide elections ===
Year	Candidate	Office	State	District	Votes	%	Result	Notes	Ref
2014	Evan Falchuk	Governor	Massachusetts	At-Large	71,814	3.33%	Lost	ran as a United Independent Party candidate	

=== State legislature elections ===
Year	Candidate	Office	State	District	Votes	%	Result	Notes	Ref
2016	Daniel Fishman	House	Massachusetts	6th Essex	5,045	22.51%	Lost	ran as a United Independent Party candidate	
2016	John Fresolo	House	Massachusetts	16th Worcester	3,804	29.82%	Lost	ran as a United Independent Party candidate	

== See also ==
- Political parties and political designations in Massachusetts
- Democratic Socialists of America
- Social Democrats, USA
- Green Party of the United States
- History of left-wing politics in the United States
- History of the socialist movement in the United States
