= Sean Garballey =

American politician (born 1985)

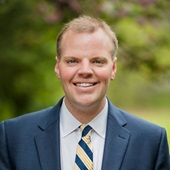

Member of the Massachusetts House of Representatives from the 23rd Middlesex district
- Incumbent
- Assumed office 2008
- Preceded by: J. James Marzilli Jr.

Personal details
- Born: February 22, 1985 (age 41)
- Party: Democratic
- Education: University of Massachusetts Lowell (B.A., Political Science, 2007)
- Website: Massachusetts General Court Member Profile: Sean Garballey

Sean Garballey (born February 22, 1985) is an American politician, the current Massachusetts State Representative for the 23rd Middlesex District representing Arlington and West Medford. He was elected in a special election on 4 March 2008, after the incumbent, J. James Marzilli Jr. won a 2007 special election for a seat in the Massachusetts Senate.

== Early life and career ==
Garballey, born in Arlington, Massachusetts attended Arlington Public Schools. He earned a B.A. in Political Science from UMass Lowell in 2007. At the time of his election he was enrolled in a dual Political Science and Public Administration masters program at Suffolk University, but did not complete the degree.

== Elections ==
While completing college, he was elected to the Arlington School Committee in 2005 serving until 2008.

In the 5 February 2008 special Democratic primary election for the 23rd Middlesex District seat, Garballey faced off against fellow school committee member Jeff Thielman and first time candidate Andrew O'Brien. Garballey received 47% of the vote, with Thielman taking 43% and O'Brien taking 10%. Garballey went on to face Republican John Worden, former Arlington town moderator, and Independent Robert Valeri, a local businessman. Garballey won the 4 March 2008 special election with 67% of the vote. Worden received 29%, and Valeri received 4%. Garballey was elected at age 23.

In 2008 and 2010 Garballey ran unopposed in both the primary and general elections.

In 2012, Garballey was re-elected. He defeated Republican Joseph Monju in the general election.

== Committee Assignments ==
For the 2025-26 Session, Garballey sits on the following committees in the House:

- Chairperson, Joint Committee on Tourism, Arts and Cultural Development

For the 2021–22 and 2023-24 Session, Garballey sat on the following committees in the House:

- Chairperson, House Committee on Global Warming and Climate Change
- Joint Committee on Higher Education

For the 2019-20 Session, Garballey sat on the following committees in the House:

- Vice Chair, Joint Committee on State Administration and Regulatory Oversight
- House Committee on Ways and Means
- Joint Committee on Higher Education
- Joint Committee on Tourism, Arts and Cultural Development
- Joint Committee on Ways and Means

For the 2017-18 Session, Garballey sat on the following committees in the House:

- Vice Chair, Joint Committee on Higher Education
- House Committee on Redistricting
- House Committee on Ways and Means
- Joint Committee on Economic Development and Emerging Technologies
- Joint Committee on Ways and Means

For the 2015-16 Session, Garballey sat on the following committees in the House:

- Vice Chair, Joint Committee on Higher Education
- House Committee on Technology and Intergovernmental Affairs
- House Committee on Ways and Means
- Joint Committee on Municipalities and Regional Government
- Joint Committee on Ways and Means

For the 2013-14 Session, Garballey sat on the following committees in the House:

- House Committee on Ways and Means
- Joint Committee on Health Care Financing
- Joint Committee on Municipalities and Regional Government
- Joint Committee on Ways and Means

For the 2011-12 Session, Garballey sat on the following committees in the House:

- Vice Chair, Joint Committee on Election Laws
- Joint Committee on Municipalities and Regional Government
- Joint Committee on Tourism, Arts and Cultural Development
- Special Joint Committee on Redistricting

For the 2009-10 Session, Garballey sat on the following committees in the House:

- House Committee on Global Warming and Climate Change
- Joint Committee on Environment, Natural Resources and Agriculture
- Joint Committee on Labor and Workforce Development

*Public records do not list Garballey's committee assignments from 2008 assignment.

== Caucuses ==
While Garballey's Legislative profile does not list his caucus affirmations directly, he is publicly associated with the following:

- Member, Foster Care Coalition
- Advocate, Food Policy Council Supporter

== Councils ==
Garballey is involved in the following commissions and councils:

- Proposer, Children's Vision and Eye Health Advisory Council
- Legislative Supporter - Massachusetts Food Policy Council

== Issues ==
In the 2013-2014 legislative session of the Massachusetts General Court, Garballey serves on the Joint Committee on Ways and Means, the Joint Committee on Health Care Financing, and the Joint Committee on Municipalities and Regional Government.

In the 2011-2012 session of the Massachusetts General Court, Garballey served as the vice-chairman to the Joint Committee on Election Laws. He was also appointed to the Joint Committee on Municipalities and Regional Government, the Joint Committee on Tourism, Arts, and Cultural Development, as well as the Special Joint Committee on Redistricting.

On Education, Garballey, as a member of the Foster Care Coalition, joined Governor Deval Patrick for the signing of An Act Protecting Children in the Care of the Commonwealth.

On the Environment, Garballey supported the Oil-Spill Prevention legislation as well as the Creation of the Food Policy Council.

== Public office ==
- Arlington Town Meeting member (2003–2008)
- Arlington School Committee (2005–2008)
- Massachusetts House of Representatives (2008–present)

== See also ==
- 2019–2020 Massachusetts legislature
- 2021–2022 Massachusetts legislature

Massachusetts House of Representatives
Preceded by J. James Marzilli Jr.	Massachusetts State Representative, 23rd Middlesex District; 2008 - present	Succeeded by incumbent
