= Julian Cyr =

American politician

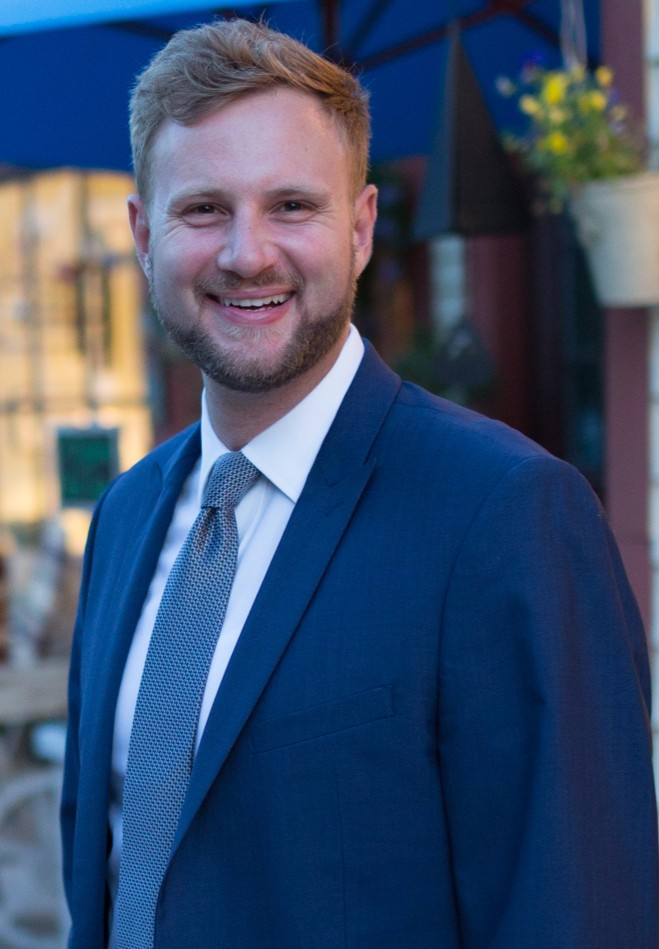

Member of the Massachusetts Senate from the Cape and Islands district
- Incumbent
- Assumed office January 4, 2017
- Preceded by: Dan Wolf

Personal details
- Born: January 19, 1986 (age 40) Hyannis, Massachusetts, U.S.
- Party: Democratic
- Education: New York University
- Website: http://www.juliancyr.com/

Julian Andre Cyr is an American politician, who was elected to the Massachusetts State Senate in 2016. A Democrat, he represents the Cape and Islands district. In 2017, Cyr completed John F. Kennedy School of Government program for senior executives in state and local government as a David Bohnett LGBTQ Victory Institute Leadership Fellow.

A native of Truro, Massachusetts, prior to his election to the senate he worked on policy and regulatory affairs for the Massachusetts Department of Public Health and served as chair of the Massachusetts Commission on LGBT Youth.

== Election ==
Cyr was elected to the State Senate in 2016. He won the Democratic primary on September 8 against Sheila Lyons, securing 55% of the vote to 38%. Cyr went on to win the general election on November 8, defeating Republican Tony Schiavi, winning 57% to 43%.

Cyr has run unopposed on every cycle since.

== See also ==
- 2019–2020 Massachusetts legislature
- 2021–2022 Massachusetts legislature
