= MassINC =

Nonprofit organization in Boston, U.S.

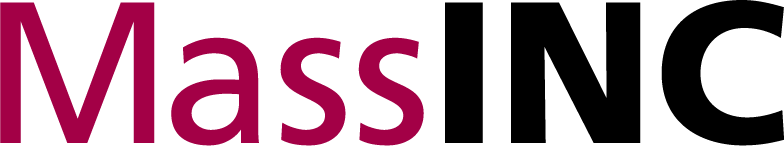
- The MassINC Logo
- Founded: April 14, 1995; 31 years ago
- Type: Non-profit NGO
- Headquarters: 11 Beacon Street, Suite 500, Boston, Massachusetts
- Region served: Massachusetts, Southern New Hampshire
- Products: CommonWealth Beacon
- Services: Policy research, civic engagement, journalism, polling
- Revenue: $3,117,880 (2024)
- Expenses: $2,696,023 (2024)
- Website: massinc.org

The Massachusetts Institute for a New Commonwealth, or "MassINC," is a non-profit 501(c) organization.

== Activity ==
MassINC was founded in 1996 by Tripp Jones and Michael Gritton.

== MassINC Polling Group ==
The MassINC Polling Group is an opinion research company.

== CommonWealth Beacon ==
The CommonWealth Magazine Logo

CommonWealth Beacon is a web-based publication that covers politics, policy, ideas, and civic life, with an emphasis on investigative reporting, in-depth analysis, and political mapping. Two of the largest sponsors are the John S. and James L. Knight Foundation and The Boston Foundation. CommonWealth Beacon is published by MassINC. The magazine initially operated a print edition, but this ceased publication in 2018.
