= Jamie Eldridge =

American politician

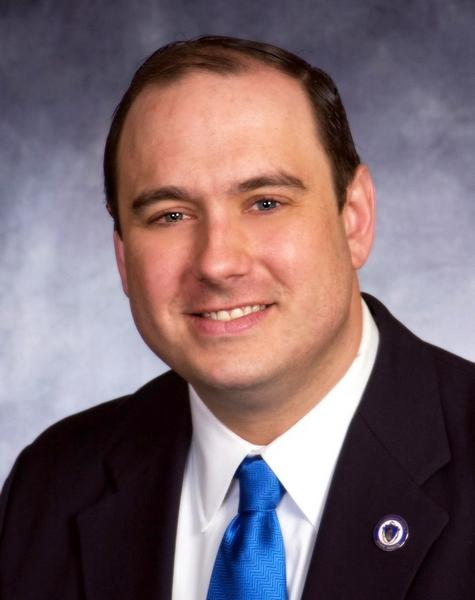

Member of the Massachusetts Senate from the Middlesex and Worcester district
- Incumbent
- Assumed office January 7, 2009
- Preceded by: Pam Resor

Member of the Massachusetts House of Representatives from the 37th Middlesex district
- In office January 1, 2003 – December 31, 2008
- Preceded by: None (District Created 2003)
- Succeeded by: Jennifer Benson

Personal details
- Born: James Bradley Eldridge; August 11, 1973 (age 53) Acton, Massachusetts, U.S.
- Party: Democratic
- Education: Johns Hopkins University (BA); Boston College (JD)
- Website: Jamie Eldridge's site

James Bradley Eldridge (born August 11, 1973) is an American politician and lawyer. He serves as a Democratic member of the Massachusetts Senate from the Middlesex and Worcester District. Eldridge previously served three terms in the Massachusetts House of Representatives, where he sat on the Joint Committee on Community Development and Small Business, the Joint Committee on Election Laws, and the Joint Committee on Public Service.

== Education ==
Eldridge attended the Acton Public Schools and graduated from Acton-Boxborough Regional High School in 1991. He was one of the original founders of the school's community service group, Acton Boxborough Community Outreach. He attended Johns Hopkins University in Baltimore, and majored in political science. As an undergraduate, he was a member of the fraternity Sigma Alpha Mu, and volunteered in the 1992 Presidential Election, and was elected student body president. During his time at Johns Hopkins, he interned for Congressman Marty Meehan. He started studies at Boston College Law School in 1997 and graduated in 2000.

== Career ==
In his second year of law school, Eldridge managed then-State Representative Pam Resor’s successful re-election campaign in 1998. During this campaign, he worked on the historic Massachusetts Clean Elections bill, which provided public financing to political candidates willing to accept campaign spending limits and the prohibition of accepting of special interest and large financial contributions. After the bill passed by voter referendum, Jamie was appointed as the Middlesex and Worcester Senate District Coordinator. From 1995 to 1997 he was a paralegal litigation associate with Hale and Dorr (now WilmerHale).

From 2001 to 2003 he served on the Acton Housing Authority and the Acton Planning Board.

In the same year, he also became vice-president of the re-energized Acton Conservation Trust. He completed a summer internship as a student prosecutor for the Middlesex County District Attorney's Office. He worked as a prosecutor in the towns of Natick and Framingham, and assisted on the district attorney's community-based justice program in the City of Lowell. In his final year of law school, Eldridge was elected chair of the Acton Democratic Town Committee.

Eldridge worked for Merrimack Valley Legal Services in Lowell, a non-profit organization that provides free legal services to the poor and the elderly. He worked as a public interest lawyer in the fields of housing, Social Security disability, and unemployment law.

He received the National Association for Public Interest Law Equal Justice Fellowship; a national two-year fellowship that allows recent law graduates to create their dream public interest project to help the less fortunate. The fellowship allowed him to create the Community Development Justice Project, which allowed him to practice community economic development law in Lowell, to help build affordable housing, start new businesses, and create non-profits to address local problems. Eldridge left his fellowship early to devote his full energies to running for the 37th Middlesex District open seat.

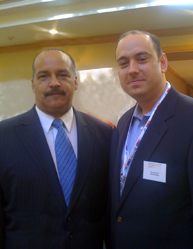
Eldridge with Maryland Delegate Curt Anderson at the 2008 Democratic National Convention

Eldridge was elected to Massachusetts House of Representatives on November 5, 2002. Upon his election, Eldridge became the first elected official in the history of Massachusetts to be elected as a Clean Elections candidate. To date, he remains the only such elected official, as the Massachusetts Clean Elections law was repealed a little over a year later. He was subsequently sworn in on January 1, 2003. The district included the towns of Boxborough, Harvard, Lunenburg, Shirley, and portions of Acton and Lancaster.

In 2007, Eldridge was a candidate in the Democratic primary for a special election to replace Marty Meehan as United States Congressman for Massachusetts's 5th congressional district. He lost the five-way Democratic primary to Niki Tsongas, whom he then endorsed. The Lowell Sun called Eldridge's third-place finish a "sign of a bright future".

Eldridge had endorsed Barack Obama for president, and was elected to be a pledged delegate for Obama at the 2008 Democratic National Convention.

Eldridge assumed the Massachusetts Senate seat formerly held by Pam Resor (District of Middlesex and Worcester) on January 7, 2009.

Eldrige won re-election to the state senate by 57% to 43% on November 2, 2010.

Eldridge has proposed a variety of legislation on the environment, economic justice, and a variety of other issues in his legislative career. He was the lead sponsor of bullying-prevention legislation, a version of which was passed by the legislature and signed into law in 2010.

In his current term in the state senate, Senator Eldridge has promised to fight for single-payer healthcare.

On February 28, 2014, Eldridge endorsed Don Berwick for governor in the 2014 Massachusetts gubernatorial election

In January 2016, Eldridge formally endorsed Bernie Sanders in the 2016 Democratic Party presidential primaries. He later served as a delegate for Sanders at the 2016 Democratic National Convention.

On August 9, 2017, Eldridge announced that he was considering running for congress in the 2018 election in Massachusetts's 3rd congressional district after Congresswoman Niki Tsongas announced that she would retire at the end of her current term. He later decided not to run for congress and stay in the state senate.

He won re-election on November 6, 2018 defeating Republican challenger Margaret Busse and Independent challenger Terra Friedrichs.

In 2020, he endorsed Bernie Sanders in the 2020 Democratic Party presidential primaries and later served on his campaign as state co-chair.

== Personal life ==
Eldridge is an Acton, Massachusetts, native and the son of a public school kindergarten teacher and electrical engineer.

== See also ==
- 2019–2020 Massachusetts legislature
- 2021–2022 Massachusetts legislature
