= Parexel =

Clinical trials management company

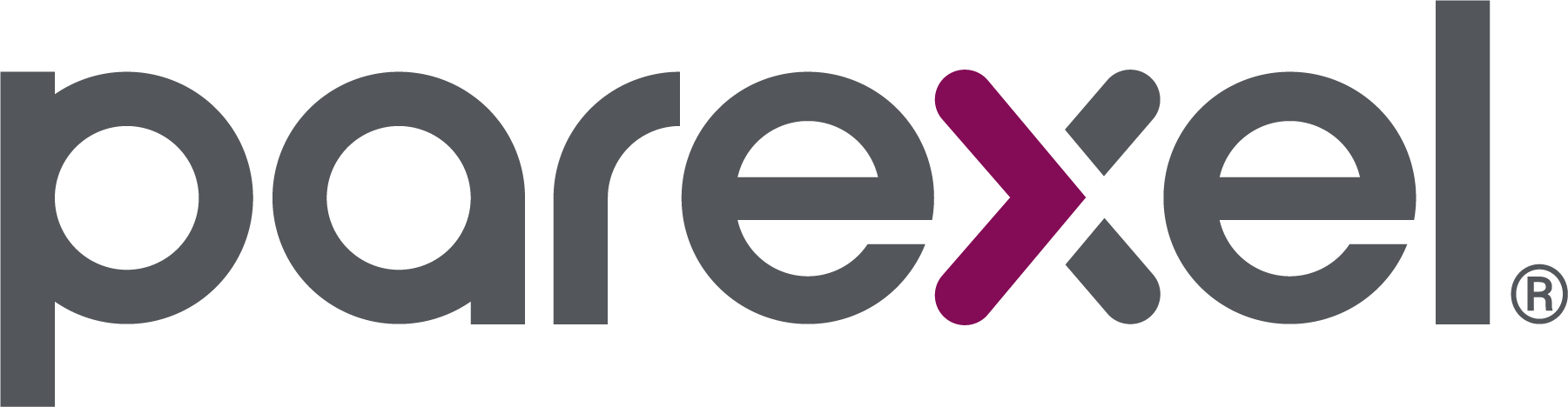
- Type: Private
- Traded as: Nasdaq: PRXL (former symbol)
- Industry: Contract research organizations Pharmaceutical
- Founded: 1982; 44 years ago
- Headquarters: Raleigh, North Carolina, U.S.
- Number of locations: 84+ facilities in 49 countries
- Key people: Peyton Howell (CEO)
- Services: clinical trial management, data management, medical writing, biostatistics, pharmacovigilance, regulatory consulting
- Revenue: ▲$2.3 billion (2017)
- Number of employees: 24,000+ (2025)
- Website: parexel.com

Parexel is an American contract research organization. It conducts clinical trials on behalf of its pharmaceutical and biotechnology clients to expedite drug development and clinical trial progress.

Parexel was founded in 1982 by Josef von Rickenbach and organic chemist Anne B. Sayigh initially to advise Japanese and German firms on how to navigate the US Food and Drug Administration (FDA) drug approval process. The firm has grown organically over the years and through 40 acquisitions. Josef von Rickenbach is credited with establishing Parexel's culture and practices based on the principles he experienced as a researcher at Schering-Plough in Lucerne, Switzerland, before leaving the company upon retiring in 2018. In 1990, the firm expanded internationally and established new practice areas. By 1999, it had a staff of 4,500 and 45 offices.

The company was acquired in 2017 by private equity firm Pamplona Capital Management. On July 2, 2021, Parexel announced a merger agreement under which it would be acquired by EQT IX fund and Goldman Sachs for $8.5 billion. EQT and Goldman Sachs completed the acquisition on November 15, 2021.

== Operations ==
With a global workforce of about 21,000 in 2025, Parexel provides clinical research support to its clients over the range of Phase I to IV clinical trials in various therapeutic categories, including neuroscience, general medicine, oncology, and infectious diseases, among others. Examples of services provided include management of clinical trial subjects and trial investigators, regulatory approval, outsourcing, market access strategies, medical communications, and drug safety assessment.

In 2024, Parexel established a collaboration with Palantir Technologies, a software company using artificial intelligence for data management solutions in clinical trials.

== History ==
Parexel was founded in 1982 by chemist Anne B. Sayigh and businessperson Josef von Rickenbach in Cambridge, Massachusetts. Its name derived from the 16th century Swiss scientist, "Paracelsus", who is credited with starting the field of chemistry.

Initially, Parexel was focused on helping pharmaceutical businesses in Japan and Germany to obtain approval for their candidate drugs by the US FDA. Parexel also published a newsletter on FDA regulatory news called the U.S. Regulatory Reporter, which was the foundation of its medical marketing division.

In 1984, new legislation made it easier to produce generic drugs, leading to a rapid expansion of the market for contract research. Parexel started providing its own contract clinical research services in 1986, growing to $14.75 million in annual revenues in 1990. In the 1990s, Parexel opened new offices in California, North Carolina, Japan, Italy, and Australia. By 2018, Parexel had some 18,900 employees with operations in 100 countries.

Parexel went public on NASDAQ in 1995. It used the funding to make a series of acquisitions, including six consulting companies, two medical marketing businesses, and three European businesses in 1998. By 2018, Parexel had completed more than 40 mergers and acquisitions.

In September 2017, private equity firm Pamplona Capital Management bought Parexel for $5 billion, taking it off the public market. By this time, Parexel had more than $2 billion in annual revenues. In 2021, Parexel was acquired again for $8.5 billion by two private equity firms, EQT Private Equity and Goldman Sachs Asset Management.

In 2026, Parexel acquired Vitrana, an AI-powered pharmacovigilance platform provider, to expand its patient safety technology capabilities.
