= 2013 United States Senate special election in Massachusetts =

- June 25, 2013
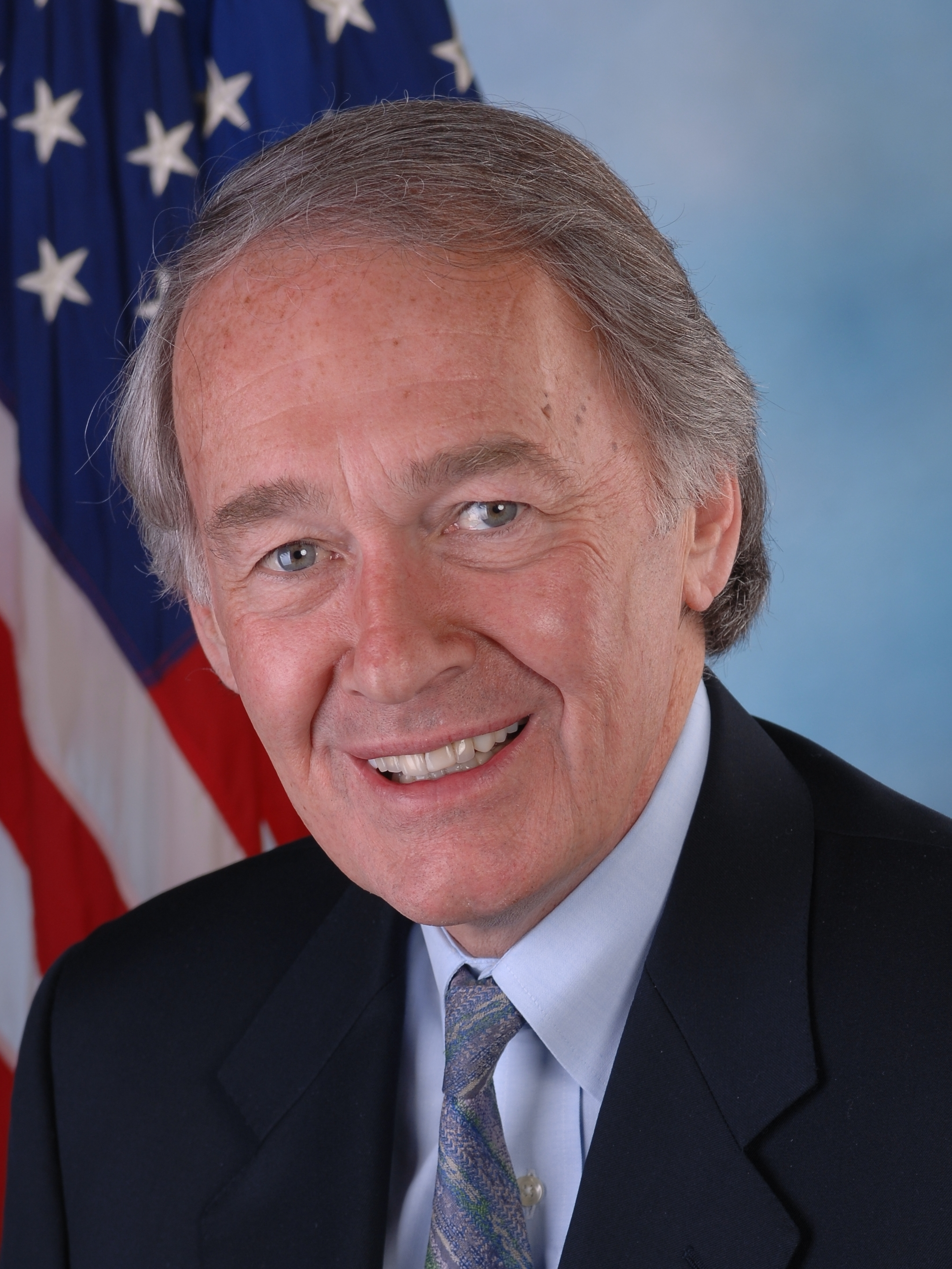

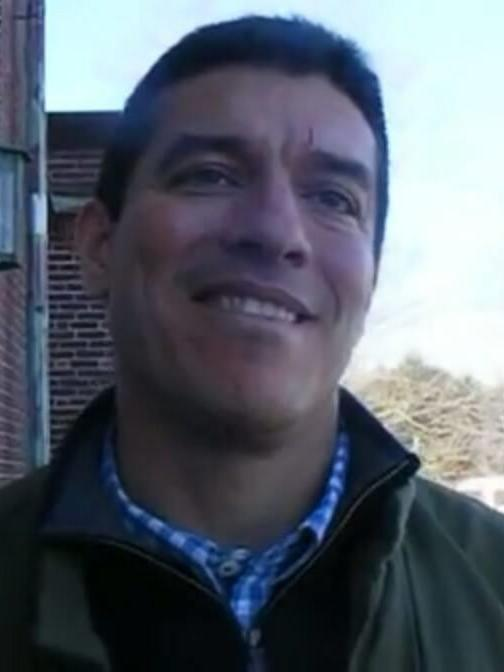
Nominee	Ed Markey	Gabriel E. Gomez
Party	Democratic	Republican
Popular vote	645,429	525,307
Percentage	54.80%	44.60%
- Markey: 40–50% 50–60% 60–70% 70–80% 80–90% >90% Gomez: 40–50% 50–60% 60–70% 70–80% Tie: 40–50% 50% No votes
U.S. senator before election
Mo Cowan (Note: In February 2013, Cowan was appointed by Governor Deval Patrick to fill the vacancy caused by the resignation of Senator John Kerry, who had become U.S. secretary of state.)
Democratic
Elected U.S. Senator
Ed Markey
Democratic

A special election was held on June 25, 2013, to fill the Massachusetts Class 2 United States Senate seat for the remainder of the term ending January 3, 2015.

The vacancy that prompted the special election was created by the resignation of Senator John Kerry, to become U.S. secretary of state. On January 30, 2013, Governor Deval Patrick chose his former chief of staff, Mo Cowan, to serve as interim U.S. senator. Cowan declined to participate in the election. A party primary election was held on April 30, to determinate the nominees of each party for the general election. The Massachusetts Democrats nominated U.S. Representative Ed Markey, while the Massachusetts Republicans nominated Gabriel E. Gomez, a businessman and former Navy SEAL.

The race drew remarks from the media, because of its potential similarity to the 2010 special election, when Republican state senator Scott Brown upset the Democratic nominee, Massachusetts Attorney General Martha Coakley. However, Gomez trailed Markey in every opinion poll taken, and Markey defeated him by 120,122 votes, despite low turnout.

== Background ==
The incumbent senator, John Kerry (Democratic), was nominated to serve as U.S. secretary of state by President Barack Obama on December 21, 2012. He was confirmed by the Senate on January 29, 2013, and in a letter to Massachusetts Governor Deval Patrick, Kerry announced his resignation from the Senate, effective February 1. Kerry was sworn in as secretary of state on the same day.

Patrick's former chief of staff, Mo Cowan, was appointed to replace Kerry in the Senate on the same day, and immediately ruled himself out of the special election. The special primary elections took place on April 30. Democratic U.S. Representative Ed Markey and Republican businessman Gabriel E. Gomez won their respective primaries.

== Democratic primary ==
U.S. Representatives Ed Markey and Stephen F. Lynch both announced campaigns for the open seat. Markey was perceived as more left-wing than Lynch.

=== Candidates ===
- Stephen F. Lynch, U.S. representative from South Boston
- Ed Markey, U.S. representative from Malden

==== Declined ====
- Ben Affleck, actor
- Michael Capuano, U.S. representative, 2010 Democratic candidate for U.S. Senate
- Martha Coakley, attorney general of Massachusetts and nominee for the U.S. Senate in 2010
- Mo Cowan, appointed incumbent U.S. senator
- Benjamin Downing, state senator
- Kimberley Driscoll, mayor of Salem
- Barney Frank, former U.S. representative
- Edward M. Kennedy Jr., entrepreneur, investment banker, lawyer, and son of Senator Ted Kennedy
- Victoria Reggie Kennedy, widow of senator Ted Kennedy
- Gerard Leone, Middlesex County district attorney
- Jim McGovern, U.S. representative
- Marty Meehan, chancellor of the University of Massachusetts, Lowell and former U.S. representative
- Carmen Ortiz, U.S. attorney for the District of Massachusetts
- Deval Patrick, governor of Massachusetts
- Jonah Pesner, rabbi
- Niki Tsongas, U.S. representative and widow of Senator Paul Tsongas

=== Debates ===
- Complete video of debate, March 27, 2013 - C-SPAN
- Complete video of debate, April 22, 2013 - C-SPAN

=== Endorsements ===
Stephen F. Lynch

Politicians

- Johnathan Blodgett, district attorney of Essex County
- Frank Burke, Weymouth town councilor
- Cheryl Coakley-Rivera, state representative from the 10th Hampden District
- Joe Connolly, treasurer of Norfolk County
- Michael Finn, state representative from the 6th Hampden District
- Jane Hackett, Weymouth town councilor
- Susan Kay, mayor of Weymouth
- George Kelley, West Springfield city councilor
- T.J. Lacey, Weymouth town councilor
- Arthur Matthews, Weymouth town councilor
- John Merrigan, Franklin County register of probate
- Frank A. Moran, state representative from the 17th Essex District,
- Linda M. Pereira, Fall River City Council president
- Greg Shanahan, former Weymouth town councilor
- John Sweeney, West Springfield city councilor

Labor unions

- International Brotherhood of Electrical Workers Local 2222
- Massachusetts Building Trades Council
- Professional Firefighters of Massachusetts
- Transport Workers Union Local 2054
Ed Markey

U.S. presidents and vice presidents

- Joe Biden, 47th vice president of the United States
- Bill Clinton, former president of the United States
- Al Gore, former vice president of the United States
- Barack Obama, 44th president of the United States

U.S. cabinet members

- John Kerry, U.S. secretary of state and former U.S. senator (D-MA)

U.S. senators

- Michael Bennet, U.S. senator (D-CO)
- Elizabeth Warren, U.S. senator (D-MA)

Members of the U.S. House of Representatives

- Xavier Becerra, U.S. representative (D-CA)
- Barney Frank, former U.S. representative (D-MA)
- Debbie Wasserman Schultz, U.S. representative (D-FL) and chairperson of the Democratic National Committee

Governors

- Lincoln Chafee, governor of Rhode Island
- Deval Patrick, governor of Massachusetts

Other state constitutional officers

- Martha Coakley, Massachusetts attorney general and Democratic nominee for U.S. Senate in 2010
- Steve Grossman, Massachusetts state treasurer

State legislators

- Richard Alcombright, mayor of North Adams
- Denise Andrews, state representative from the 2nd Franklin District
- Brian Ashe, state representative from the 2nd Hampden District
- Michael J. Barrett, state senator from the 3rd Middlesex District
- Paul Brodeur, state representative from the 32nd Middlesex District
- Will Brownsberger, state senator from the 2nd Suffolk and Middlesex District
- Gale D. Candaras, state senator from the 1st Hampden and Hampshire District
- Gailanne Cariddi, state representative from the 1st Berkshire District
- Gary Christenson, mayor of Malden
- Katherine Clark, state senator from the Middlesex and Essex District
- Richard Cohen, mayor of Agawam
- Tom Conroy, state representative from the 13th Middlesex District
- Sean Curran, state representative from the 9th Hampden District
- Marjorie Decker, state representative from the 25th Middlesex District
- Robert DeLeo, speaker of the Massachusetts House of Representatives
- Marcos Devers, state representative from the 16th Essex District
- Sal DiDomenico, state senator from the Middlesex, Suffolk and Essex District
- Robert Dolan, mayor of Melrose
- Paul Donato, state representative from the 35th Middlesex District
- Ken Donnelly, state senator from the 4th Middlesex District
- James J. Dwyer, state representative from the 30th Middlesex District
- Carolyn Dykema, state representative from the 8th Middlesex District
- Tricia Farley-Bouvier, state representative from the 3rd Berkshire District
- Scott Galvin, mayor of Woburn
- Sean Garballey, state representative from the 23rd Middlesex District
- Jon Hecht, state representative from the 29th Middlesex District
- Patricia D. Jehlen, state senator from the 2nd Middlesex District
- Jay Kaufman, state representative from the 15th Middlesex District
- Peter Kocot, state representative from the 1st Hampshire District
- Stephen Kulik, state representative from the 1st Franklin District
- John J. Lawn, state representative from the 10th Middlesex District
- Jason Lewis, state representative from the 31st Middlesex District
- David Linsky, state representative from the 5th Middlesex District
- Michael J. McGlynn, mayor of Medford
- Marc R. Pacheco, state senator from the 1st Plymouth and Bristol District
- Thomas Petrolati, state representative from the 7th Hampden District
- Anthony Petruccelli, state senator from the 1st Suffolk and Middlesex District
- Daniel Rizzo, mayor of Revere
- Dave Rogers, state representative from the 24th Middlesex District
- Tom Sannicandro, state representative from the 7th Middlesex District
- Carl Sciortino, state representative from the 34th Middlesex District
- Karen Spilka, state senator from the 2nd Middlesex and Norfolk District
- Thomas Stanley, state representative from the 9th Middlesex District
- Ellen Story, state representative from the 3rd Hampshire District
- Benjamin Swan, state representative from the 11th Hampden District
- Aaron Vega, state representative from the 5th Hampden District
- Chris Walsh, state representative from the 6th Middlesex District
- James T. Welch, state senator from the Hampden District

County officials

- Tom Bowler, sheriff of Berkshire County
- Dave Sullivan, district attorney of Northwestern County

Mayors

- Daniel Bianchi, mayor of Pittsfield
- Michael Bloomberg, mayor of New York City (political independent)
- Thomas Menino, mayor of Boston
- David Narkewicz, mayor of Northampton
- Domenic Sarno, mayor of Springfield
- Michael Tautznik, mayor of Easthampton

City councilors

- Ayanna Pressley, at-large Boston city councilor
- Charles Yancey, Boston City Councilor from district 4

Individuals

- Caroline Kennedy, daughter of 35th president of the United States John F. Kennedy
- Victoria Kennedy, widow of former U.S. senator Ted Kennedy (D-MA)
- Carole King, singer-songwriter
- Michelle Obama, first lady of the United States

Newspapers and publications

- The Boston Globe
- El Planeta

Labor unions

- AFSCME Council 93
- Association of Flight Attendants
- Massachusetts Nurses Association
- Massachusetts Teachers Association
- National Education Association
- National Nurses United
- United Steelworkers

Business people

- John Donahue, president and CEO of Arbella Insurance Group
- Robert Epstein, president of Horizon Beverages
- Kenneth Feinberg, head of The One Fund Boston
- Greg Foster, president of IMAX Corporation
- Jeffrey Katzenberg, CEO of DreamWorks Animation
- Larry Lucchino, president and CEO of the Boston Red Sox
- Peter Lynch, stock investor and research consultant at Fidelity Investments
- Eric Schmidt, executive chairman of Google
- Peter Slavin, president of Massachusetts General Hospital
- David Stern, Commissioner of the National Basketball Association
- George Tsunis, founder and CEO of Chartwell Hotels

Organizations

- Alliance for Retired Americans
- Democratic Senatorial Campaign Committee
- Human Rights Campaign
- League of Conservation Voters
- Massachusetts AFL–CIO
- MassEquality
- MoveOn.org
- NARAL Pro-Choice America
- Planned Parenthood
- Progressive Massachusetts
- Sierra Club
- United States High School Democrats

=== Polling ===
Poll source	Date(s) administered	Sample size	Margin of error	Stephen Lynch	Ed Markey	Other	Undecided
Public Policy Polling	January 29–30, 2013	763	±4.9%	19%	52%	—	29%
Public Policy Polling	February 13–14, 2013	426 LV	±4.8%	28%	43%	—	29%
WBUR/MassINC	March 19–21, 2013	610 LV	±4.1%	24%	35%	0%	41%
Public Policy Polling	March 26–27, 2013	496 LV	±4.4%	32%	49%	0%	19%
WNEU	April 11–18, 2013	270 LV	±6%	34%	44%	0%	21%

Hypothetical polling

Poll source	Date(s) administered	Sample size	Margin of error	Mike Capuano	Martha Coakley	Vicki Kennedy	Stephen Lynch	Ed Markey	Marty Meehan	Deval Patrick	Other	Undecided
Emerson College	December 16–18, 2012	1,053 RV	±2.9%	13%	11%	16%	—	—	—	20%	10%	30%
WBUR/MassINC	December 17–18, 2012	500 RV	±3.3%	8%	21%	—	5%	5%	3%	36%	3%	19%

=== Results ===
Results by municipality: Markey: 50–60%; 60–70%; 70–80%; 80–90%; 90–100%; Lynch: 50–60%; 60–70%; 70–80%; 80–90% Tie

Results by precinct: Markey: 40–50%; 50–60%; 60–70%; 70–80%; 80–90%; 90–100%; Lynch: 40–50%; 50–60%; 60–70%; 70–80%; 80–90%; 90–100%; Tie No data/No votes

2013 Democratic Senate primary
Party	Candidate	Votes	%
Democratic	Ed Markey	311,219	57.35%
Democratic	Stephen F. Lynch	230,335	42.44%
Democratic	All others	1,150	0.21%
Total votes		542,704	100%

== Republican primary ==
=== Candidates ===
- Gabriel E. Gomez, businessman and former Navy SEAL
- Michael J. Sullivan, former United States attorney for the District of Massachusetts and former acting director of the Bureau of Alcohol, Tobacco, Firearms and Explosives
- Daniel Winslow, state representative

==== Withdrawn ====
- Sean Bielat, nominee for Massachusetts's 4th congressional district in 2010 and 2012
- Jon Fetherston, former Ashland selectman

==== Declined ====
- Keith Ablow, psychiatrist and Fox News contributor
- Charlie Baker, former state cabinet secretary and nominee for governor of Massachusetts in 2010
- Scott Brown, former U.S. Senator
- Lew Evangelidis, sheriff of Worcester County
- Kerry Healey, former lieutenant governor and nominee for governor in 2006
- Joe Malone, former treasurer and receiver-general of Massachusetts
- Ann Romney, former First Lady of Massachusetts
- Tagg Romney, businessman and son of former Governor Mitt Romney
- Jane Swift, former lieutenant governor and acting governor
- Bruce Tarr, State Senate minority leader
- Richard Tisei, former State Senate minority leader, nominee for lieutenant governor in 2010, and nominee for Massachusetts’ 6th congressional district in 2012
- William Weld, former governor of Massachusetts and nominee for the U.S. Senate in 1996

=== Debates ===
- Complete video of debate, March 27, 2013 - C-SPAN

=== Endorsements ===
Gabriel E. Gomez

Politicians

- Steven R. Cote, Republican candidate for councilor-at-large for Leominster
- Rudy Giuliani, 2008 presidential candidate and former mayor of New York City
- John McCain, 2008 Republican presidential candidate and U.S. Senator from Arizona
- Michael J. Sullivan
- William Weld, former governor of Massachusetts
- Daniel Winslow
Michael J. Sullivan

Politicians

- Frank Cousins, sheriff of Essex County
- Tom Hodgson, sheriff of Bristol County
- Joe McDonald, sheriff of Plymouth County
- Karyn Polito, former state representative
Daniel Winslow

Social and political activists

- Barbara Anderson, veteran anti-tax activist

Newspapers

- The Boston Globe
- Boston Herald
- Lowell Sun
- Springfield Republican

=== Polling ===
Poll source	Date(s) administered	Sample size	Margin of error	Gabriel Gomez	Michael Sullivan	Daniel Winslow	Other	Undecided
WBUR/MassINC	March 19–21, 2013	610 LV	±4.1%	8%	28%	10%	3%	50%
WNEU	April 11–18, 2013	128 LV	±9%	33%	27%	9%	—	30%

Hypothetical polling

Poll source	Date(s) administered	Sample size	Margin of error	Charlie Baker	Scott Brown	Bill Weld	Other	Undecided
Emerson College	December 16–18, 2012	1,053 RV	±2.9%	—	80%	7%	5%	7%
WBUR/MassINC	December 17–18, 2012	500 RV	±3.3%	5%	81%	6%	1%	7%

=== Results ===
Primary results by municipality

2013 Republican Senate primary
Party	Candidate	Votes	%
Republican	Gabriel E. Gomez	96,057	50.75%
Republican	Michael J. Sullivan	67,946	35.89%
Republican	Daniel Winslow	24,662	13.03%
Republican	All others	628	0.33%
Total votes		189,293	100%

== General election ==
=== Candidates ===
- Gabriel E. Gomez (Republican), businessman and former Navy SEAL
- Richard A. Heos (Twelve Visions Party)
- Ed Markey (Democratic), U.S. representative from Massachusetts's 5th congressional district

==== Withdrawn ====
- Daniel Fishman (Libertarian), former teacher and nominee for Massachusetts's 6th congressional district in 2012
- Jack E. Robinson III (Independent), businessman and perennial Republican candidate

=== Debates ===
- Complete video of debate, June 5, 2013 - C-SPAN
- Complete video of debate, June 18, 2013 - C-SPAN

=== Fundraising ===
Candidate (party)	Receipts	Disbursements	Cash on hand	Debt
Ed Markey (D)	$7,866,591	$8,652,479	$2,264,701	$0
Gabriel Gomez (R)	$3,304,338	$2,307,217	$997,120	$900,100
Source: Federal Election Commission

==== Top contributors ====
Ed Markey	Contribution	Gabriel Gomez	Contribution
League of Conservation Voters	$147,518	Advent International	$38,850
Mintz, Levin, Cohn, Ferris, Glovsky, and Popeo	$35,950	Berkshire Partners	$36,300
Dish Network	$32,000	Summit Partners	$28,900
Bain Capital	$26,000	Bain Capital	$11,400
Harvard University	$24,400	Easterly Capital	$10,400
DLA Piper	$24,400	William Blair & Company	$10,300
Comcast Corporation	$23,350	HarbourVest Partners	$7,800
WilmerHale	$23,000	Power Financial Corporation	$6,200
Berkshire Group	$20,700	BMO Capital Markets	$5,200
American Cable Association	$20,500	Carlyle Group	$5,200
Source: OpenSecrets

==== Top industries ====
Ed Markey	Contribution	Gabriel Gomez	Contribution
Lawyers/law firms	$528,470	Financial institutions	$211,800
Financial institutions	$228,050	Retired	$37,250
Entertainment industry	$179,400	Misc. finance	$16,105
Environmental organizationss	$171,568	Lawyers/law firms	$13,250
Real estate	$134,900	Business services	$13,050
Lobbyists	$134,900	Commercial banks	$7,750
Retired	$107,101	Manufacturing & distributing	$6,200
Business services	$101,200	High-tech industry	$6,000
High-tech industry	$65,450	Retail industry	$5,600
Universities	$65,150	Misc. business	$5,100
Source: OpenSecrets

=== Predictions ===
Source	Rating	As of
Sabato's Crystal Ball	Likely D	May 9, 2013

=== Polling ===
Poll source	Date(s) administered	Sample size	Margin of error	Ed Markey (D)	Gabriel E. Gomez (R)	Other	Undecided
UMass Lowell-Boston Herald	March 2–5, 2013	309 RV	±4%	47%	28%	7%	19%
WBUR/MassINC	March 19–21, 2013	610 LV	±4.1%	44%	25%	3%	26%
WNEU	April 11–18, 2013	480 LV	±4.5%	51%	36%	—	12%
Emerson College	May 1, 2013	797 RV	±2.5%	42%	36%	—	16%
Public Policy Polling	May 1–2, 2013	1,539 LV	±2.5%	44%	40%	—	16%
WBUR/MassINC	May 5–6, 2013	497 LV	±4.4%	41%	35%	0%	23%
Suffolk	May 4–7, 2013	500 LV	±4.4%	52%	35%	—	13%
Public Policy Polling	May 13–15, 2013	880 LV	±3.3%	48%	41%	—	11%
Emerson College	May 20–22, 2013	867 LV	±3.26%	45%	33%	—	22%
New England College	June 1–2, 2013	734 RV	±3.62%	52%	40%	—	8%
UMass Amherst-YouGov America	May 30 – June 4, 2013	357 RV	±5.4%	51%	40%	—	9%
Public Policy Polling	June 3–4, 2013	560 LV	±5.4%	47%	39%	—	14%
WBUR	June 6–9, 2013	500 LV	±3.4%	43%	36%	—	17%
Suffolk University	June 6–9, 2013	500 LV	±3.4%	44%	36%	—	10%
Harper Polling	June 10–11, 2013	498 RV	±4.39%	49%	37%	—	14%
Boston Globe	June 11–14, 2013	508 LV	±4.3%	54%	41%	—	4%
UMass Lowell-Boston Herald	June 15–19, 2013	608 RV	±4%	56%	36%	—	7%
WNEU	June 16–20, 2013	566 LV	±4.1%	49%	41%	—	9%
Emerson College	June 19–20, 2013	1,422 RV	±2.5%	51%	41%	—	8%
Suffolk University	June 19–22, 2013	500 LV	±4.4%	52%	42%	1%	5%

Hypothetical polling

With Markey

Poll source	Date(s) administered	Sample size	Margin of error	Ed Markey (D)	Michael Sullivan (R)	Daniel Winslow (R)	Other	Undecided
UMass Lowell-Boston Herald	March 2–5, 2013	309 RV	±4%	48%	30%	—	5%	17%
UMass Lowell-Boston Herald	March 2–5, 2013	309 RV	±4%	49%	—	26%	5%	20%
WBUR/MassINC	March 19–21, 2013	610 LV	±4.1%	44%	27%	—	2%	25%
WBUR/MassINC	March 19–21, 2013	610 LV	±4.1%	44%	—	22%	3%	29%
WNEU	April 11–18, 2013	480 LV	±4.5%	52%	34%	—	—	15%
WNEU	April 11–18, 2013	480 LV	±4.5%	51%	—	32%	—	16%

With Lynch

Poll source	Date(s) administered	Sample size	Margin of error	Stephen Lynch (D)	Gabriel E. Gomez (R)	Michael Sullivan (R)	Daniel Winslow (R)	Other	Undecided
UMass Lowell-Boston Herald	March 2–5, 2013	309 RV	±4%	45%	27%	—	—	6%	22%
UMass Lowell-Boston Herald	March 2–5, 2013	309 RV	±4%	45%	—	28%	—	7%	21%
UMass Lowell-Boston Herald	March 2–5, 2013	309 RV	±4%	48%	—	—	24%	8%	19%
WBUR/MassINC	March 19–21, 2013	610 LV	±4.1%	55%	17%	—	—	1%	26%
WBUR/MassINC	March 19–21, 2013	610 LV	±4.1%	49%	—	21%	—	1%	28%
WBUR/MassINC	March 19–21, 2013	610 LV	±4.1%	52%	—	—	15%	1%	31%
WNEU	April 11–18, 2013	480 LV	±4.5%	58%	26%	—	—	—	14%
WNEU	April 11–18, 2013	480 LV	±4.5%	57%	—	25%	—	—	17%
WNEU	April 11–18, 2013	480 LV	±4.5%	59%	—	—	23%	—	16%

With Brown

Poll source	Date(s) administered	Sample size	Margin of error	Mike Capuano (D)	Martha Coakley (D)	Vicki Kennedy (D)	Stephen Lynch (D)	Ed Markey (D)	Marty Meehan (D)	Deval Patrick (D)	Generic Democrat	Scott Brown (R)	Other	Undecided
Emerson College	December 16–18, 2012	1,053 RV	±2.9%	—	—	40%	—	—	—	—	—	46%	—	14%
Emerson College	December 16–18, 2012	1,053 RV	±2.9%	—	—	—	—	—	—	48%	—	43%	—	9%
WBUR/MassINC	December 17–18, 2012	500 RV	±3.3%	28%	—	—	—	—	—	—	—	47%	4%	16%
WBUR/MassINC	December 17–18, 2012	500 RV	±3.3%	—	36%	—	—	—	—	—	—	51%	3%	8%
WBUR/MassINC	December 17–18, 2012	500 RV	±3.3%	—	—	—	24%	—	—	—	—	51%	4%	15%
WBUR/MassINC	December 17–18, 2012	500 RV	±3.3%	—	—	—	—	30%	—	—	—	48%	4%	15%
WBUR/MassINC	December 17–18, 2012	500 RV	±3.3%	—	—	—	—	—	30%	—	—	49%	4%	14%
WBUR/MassINC	December 17–18, 2012	500 RV	±3.3%	—	—	—	—	—	—	40%	—	47%	3%	7%
WBUR/MassINC	December 17–18, 2012	500 RV	±3.3%	—	—	—	—	—	—	—	39%	47%	—	15%
David Paleologos Suffolk/NAGE	?	?	±?	—	—	—	33%	—	—	—	—	42%	—	25%
David Paleologos Suffolk/NAGE	?	?	±?	—	—	—	—	39%	—	—	—	49%	—	12%
[WBUR/MassINC]	January 16–19, 2013	435 RV	±3.6%	—	—	—	—	31%	—	—	—	53%	1%	17%
[WBUR/MassINC]	January 16–19, 2013	435 RV	±3.6%	—	—	—	—	—	—	—	36%	44%	3%	12%
Public Policy Polling	January 29–30, 2013	763 RV	±3.6%	—	—	—	39%	—	—	—	—	48%	—	12%
Public Policy Polling	January 29–30, 2013	763 RV	±3.6%	—	—	—	—	45%	—	—	—	48%	—	8%

With Weld

Poll source	Date(s) administered	Sample size	Margin of error	Vicki Kennedy (D)	Deval Patrick (D)	Bill Weld (R)	Other	Undecided
Emerson College	December 16–18, 2012	1,053 RV	±2.9%	40%	—	37%	—	23%
Emerson College	December 16–18, 2012	1,053 RV	±2.9%	—	50%	32%	—	18%

=== Results ===
2013 U.S. Senate special election in Massachusetts
Party	Candidate	Votes	%	±%
Democratic	Ed Markey	645,429	54.80%	▼11.06
Republican	Gabriel Gomez	525,307	44.60%	▲13.67
Twelve Visions	Richard Heos	4,550	0.39%	N/A
Write-in		2,504	0.21%	N/A
Total votes		1,177,790	100.00%	N/A
Democratic hold				

==== By county ====
By county

County	Ed Markey Democratic		Gabriel Gomez Republican		All Others	
County	#	%	#	%	#	%
Barnstable	27,982	46.5	32,020	53.2	229	0.4
Berkshire	15,809	72.7	5,817	26.8	111	0.5
Bristol	33,791	49.0	34,722	50.2	467	0.7
Dukes	2,965	68.7	1,338	31.0	13	0.3
Essex	65,339	50.5'	63,248	48.9	720	0.6
Franklin	10,830	66.8	5,276	32.5	117	0.7
Hampden	30,894	47.0	34,504	52.4	389	0.6
Hampshire	23,818	68.0	10,952	31.3	152	0.7
Middlesex	186,651	61.2	116,716	38.3	1,770	0.6
Nantucket	1,114	55.8	877	43.9	5	0.3
Norfolk	72,565	51.9	66,339	47.5	884	0.6
Plymouth	38,588	42.5	861,649	56.9	546	0.6
Suffolk	77,683	74.5	25,924	24.9	693	0.7
Worcester	57,400	42.8	75,925	56.6	858	0.6
Totals	645,429	64.8	525,307	44.6	6,054	0.21

Counties that flipped from Democratic to Republican

- Barnstable (largest municipality: Barnstable)
- Bristol (largest municipality: New Bedford)
- Hampden (largest municipality: Springfield)
- Plymouth (largest municipality: Brockton)
- Worcester (largest municipality: Worcester)

==== By congressional district ====
Markey won six of nine congressional districts, with the remaining three going to Gomez, all of which elected Democrats.

District	Markey	Gomez	Representative
1st	53%	47%	Richard Neal
2nd	51%	49%	Jim McGovern
3rd	49%	51%	Niki Tsongas
4th	55%	45%	Joe Kennedy III
5th	65%	35%	Ed Markey
6th	49%	51%	John F. Tierney
7th	81%	19%	Mike Capuano
8th	51%	49%	Stephen Lynch
9th	46%	53%	Bill Keating
