= Massachusetts House of Representatives' 2nd Franklin district =

American legislative district

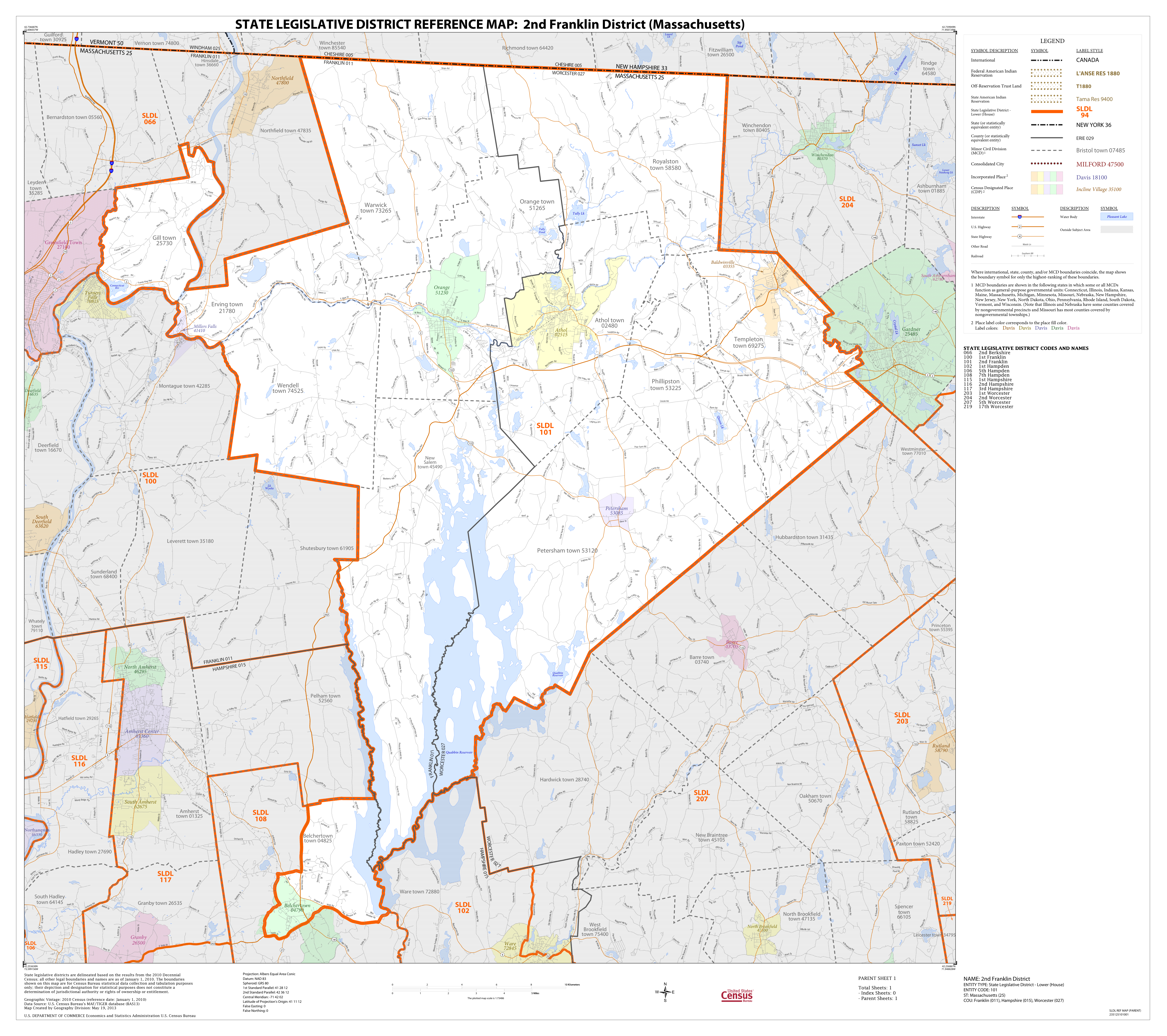
Map of Massachusetts House of Representatives' 2nd Franklin district, based on the 2010 United States census.

Massachusetts House of Representatives' 2nd Franklin district in the United States is one of 160 legislative districts included in the lower house of the Massachusetts General Court. It covers parts of Franklin County, Hampshire County, and Worcester County. Independent Susannah Whipps of Athol has represented the district since 2015.

== Towns represented ==
The district includes the following localities:

- Athol
- part of Belchertown
- Erving
- Gill
- New Salem
- Orange
- Petersham
- Phillipston
- Royalston
- Templeton
- Warwick
- Wendell

The current district geographic boundary overlaps with those of the Massachusetts Senate's 1st Hampden and Hampshire district, Hampshire, Franklin and Worcester district, and Worcester, Hampden, Hampshire and Middlesex district.

=== Former locales ===
The district previously covered:

- Greenfield, circa 1927
- Leverett, circa 1872
- Montague, circa 1872
- Shutesbury, circa 1872
- Sunderland, circa 1872

== Elections results from statewide races ==
Year	Office	District Results	Statewide Results
2012	President	Obama 56.6 – 43.3%	Obama 60.7 – 37.5%
2012	Senator	Brown 50.4 – 48.8%	Warren 53.7 – 46.2%
2013	Senator	Gomez 53.0 – 45.9%	Markey 54.8 – 44.6%
2014	Governor	Baker 50.1 – 40.1%	Baker 48.4 – 46.5%
2014	Senator	Markey 53.9 – 42.0%	Markey 61.9 – 38.0%
2016	President	Clinton 45.2 – 43.0%	Clinton 60.0 – 32.8%
2018	Governor	Baker 70.8 – 26.9%	Baker 66.6 – 33.1%
2018	Senator	Warren 50.4 – 43.3%	Warren 60.3 – 36.2%

== Representatives ==
- Wm. T. Clement, circa 1858
- Stephen Bates, circa 1859
- Franklin Levi Waters, circa 1888
- George K. Pond, circa 1920
- Walter Forbes Hurlburt, circa 1951
- Edward Shortell, circa 1975
- John Merrigan, circa 2002
- Christopher Donelan, 2003–2011
- Denise Andrews, January 5, 2011 – January 7, 2015
- Susannah Whipps, 2015-current

== See also ==
- Massachusetts House of Representatives' 1st Franklin district
- List of Massachusetts House of Representatives elections
- List of Massachusetts General Courts
- List of former districts of the Massachusetts House of Representatives

== Images ==
Portraits of legislators

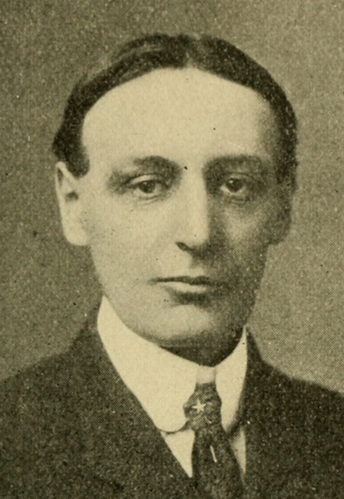
Lyman Griswold

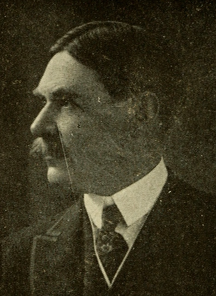
Frederick Pierce

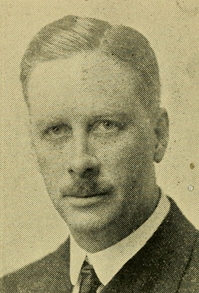
George Pond

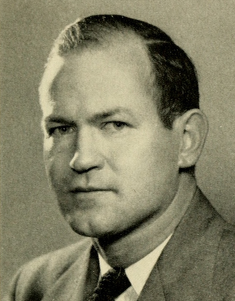
Walter Forbes Hurlburt

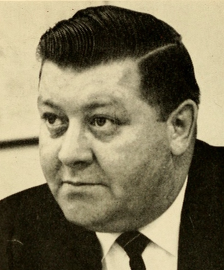
Allan McGuane

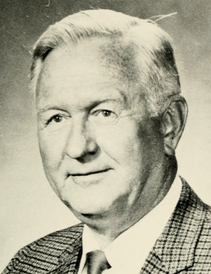
Edward Shortell

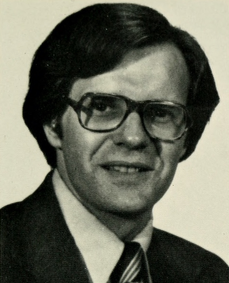
William Benson

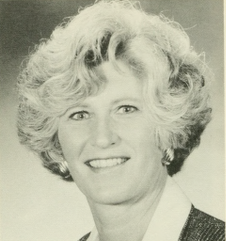
Carmen Buell

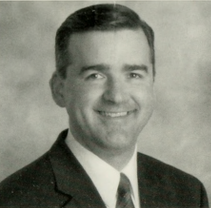
Christopher Donelan

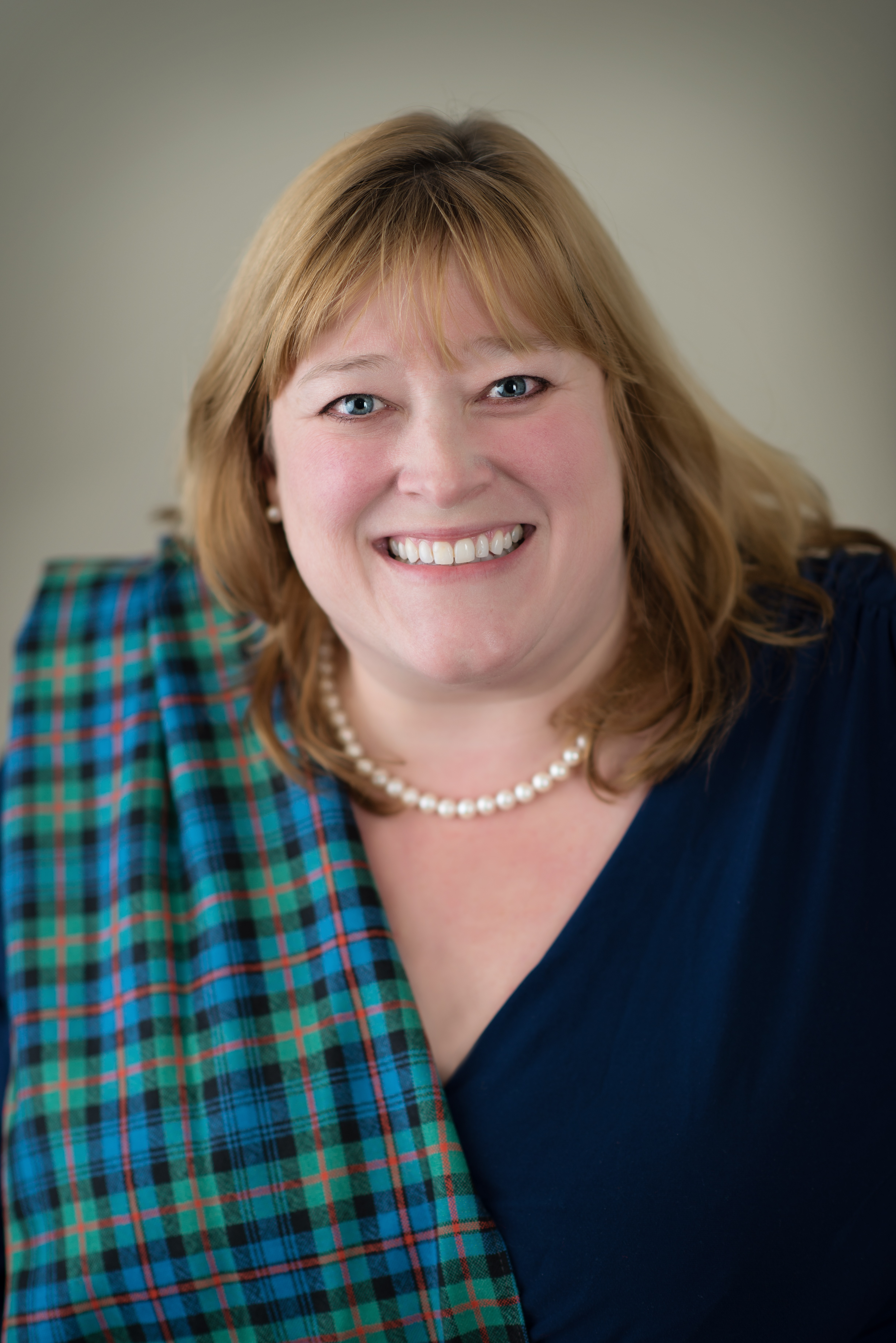
Susannah Whipps Lee
