= Overcharging =

Overcharging can refer to, among other things:

- Overcharging (law), a prosecutorial practice
- Overcharging a rechargeable battery
- Overcharge, the difference between an observed market price and a price that would have been observed in the absence of collusion
