= Electoral history of Elizabeth Warren =

Elections featuring American politician

This is the electoral history of Elizabeth Warren, the senior United States senator from Massachusetts since 2013. A Democrat, she was a candidate in the 2020 United States presidential election.

== United States Senate elections ==
=== 2012 ===
2012 Massachusetts Democratic convention vote
Party	Candidate	Votes	%
Democratic	Elizabeth Warren	3,352	95.77%
Democratic	Marisa DeFranco	148	4.23%
Total votes		3,500	100%

2012 United States Senate election in Massachusetts Democratic primary
Party	Candidate	Votes	%
Democratic	Elizabeth Warren	308,979	97.59%
Write-in		7,638	2.41%
Total votes		316,617	100%

2012 United States Senate election in Massachusetts
Party	Candidate	Votes	%	±%
Democratic	Elizabeth Warren	1,696,346	53.74%	+6.67%
Republican	Scott Brown (incumbent)	1,458,048	46.19%	−5.64%
Write-in		2,159	0.07%	N/A
Total votes		3,156,553	100%	N/A
Democratic gain from Republican				

=== 2018 ===
2018 United States Senate election in Massachusetts Democratic primary
Party	Candidate	Votes	%
Democratic	Elizabeth Warren (incumbent)	590,835	98.08%
Write-in		11,558	1.92%
Total votes		602,393	100%

2018 United States Senate election in Massachusetts
Party	Candidate	Votes	%	±%
Democratic	Elizabeth Warren (incumbent)	1,633,371	60.34%	+6.60%
Republican	Geoff Diehl	979,210	36.17%	−10.02%
Independent	Shiva Ayyadurai	91,710	3.39%	N/A
Write-in		2,799	0.10%	N/A
Total votes		2,707,090	100%	N/A
Democratic hold				

=== 2024 ===
2024 United States Senate election in Massachusetts Democratic primary
Party	Candidate	Votes	%
Democratic	Elizabeth Warren (incumbent)	562,709	98.58%
Write-in		8,078	1.42%
Total votes		570,787	100%

2024 United States Senate election in Massachusetts
Party	Candidate	Votes	%	±%
Democratic	Elizabeth Warren (incumbent)	2,041,693	59.90%	−0.14
Republican	John Deaton	1,365,445	40.10%	+3.93
Total votes		3,407,138	100%	
Democratic hold				
