= Geoff Diehl =

American politician (born 1969)

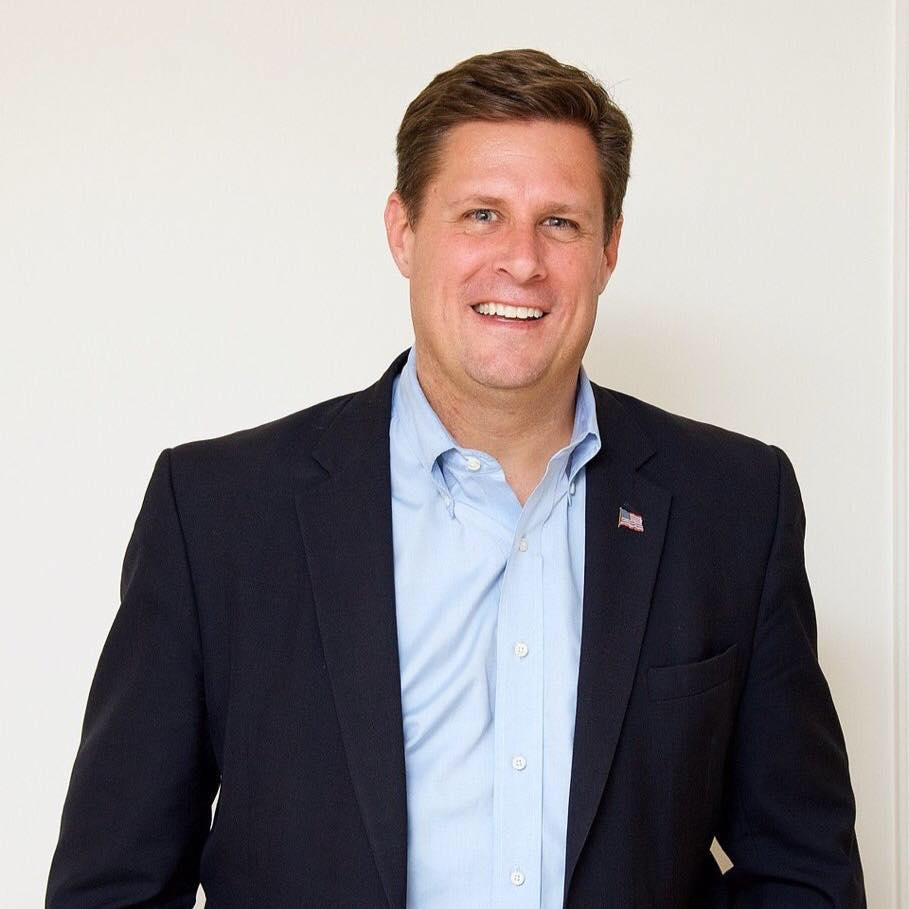

Member of the Massachusetts House of Representatives from the 7th Plymouth district
- In office January 5, 2011 – January 2, 2019
- Preceded by: Allen McCarthy
- Succeeded by: Alyson Sullivan-Almeida

Personal details
- Born: Geoffrey G. Diehl; April 23, 1969 (age 57) Bethlehem, Pennsylvania, U.S.
- Party: Republican
- Spouse: KathyJo Boss
- Children: 2
- Education: Lehigh University (BA)

Geoffrey G. Diehl (born April 23, 1969) is an American politician from Massachusetts. A Republican, he represented the 7th Plymouth district in the Massachusetts House of Representatives from 2011 to 2019.

Diehl was the unsuccessful Republican nominee for the U.S. Senate in 2018 and for governor of Massachusetts in 2022, losing to Democrats Elizabeth Warren and Maura Healey, respectively.

== Early life and education ==
Geoff Diehl was born in Bethlehem, Pennsylvania. He attended Lake Forest Academy and graduated from Lehigh University in 1992 with a Bachelor of Arts degree in Government and Urban Studies (double major).

== Career ==
After graduating, Diehl moved to New York City and worked in advertising. He later worked in television production in Los Angeles, California. In 2001, he moved to his wife's hometown of Whitman, Massachusetts, where he worked as a business development executive in the sign industry.

=== Massachusetts House of Representatives ===
==== 2010 election ====
Diehl began his campaign to represent the 7th Plymouth District on February 22, 2010. Diehl received support from previous representatives from the same district, including Andrew Card, Michael Sullivan, Ned Kirby, and Ronald Whitney. Diehl also received the endorsement of U.S. senator Scott Brown.

On November 2, 2010, he upset incumbent Allen McCarthy and was sworn in on January 5, 2011.

He was a member of the Joint Committee on Ways & Means, Housing, Transportation, Global Warming and Climate Change, Personnel & Administration, and Rules.

==== 2014 Tank the Gas Tax Movement ====
Geoff Diehl was a lead supporter of the successful ballot question campaign to repeal the Massachusetts gas tax indexing law in 2014.

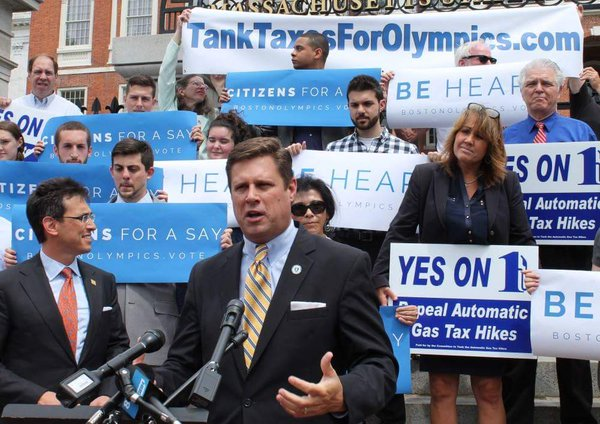
Representative Diehl speaks to the media in front of the Massachusetts State House with supporters of Question 1

=== 2018 U.S. Senate election ===
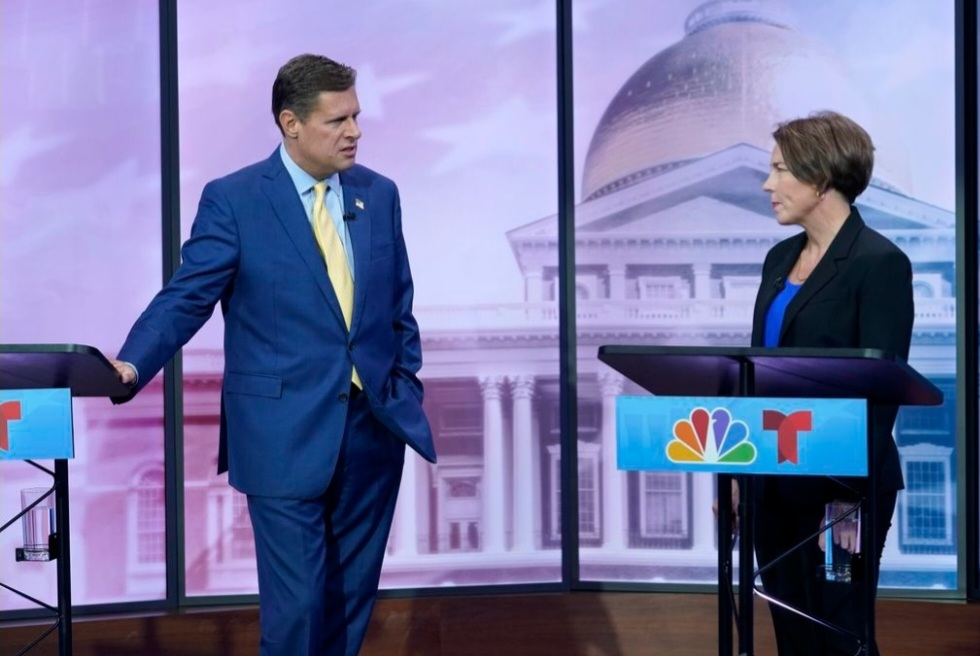
Geoff Diehl debating Maura Healey in 2022 Massachusetts gubernatorial election

In April 2017, Diehl announced his intent to challenge Elizabeth Warren for her U.S. Senate seat. In the Republican primary election held on September 4, 2018, Diehl finished first in a field of three candidates. The incumbent, Elizabeth Warren, defeated Diehl by 24 percentage points.

=== 2022 Gubernatorial campaign ===
On July 4, 2021, Geoff Diehl announced he was running for governor of Massachusetts. In October 2021, Donald Trump endorsed Geoff Diehl for governor. He was Massachusetts state co-chair of Trump's 2016 presidential campaign and a Trump delegate to the 2016 Republican National Convention. Diehl also supported Jim Lyons, the chairman of the Massachusetts Republican Party, who in January 2021 was reelected to the party chairmanship after defeating a challenge from Shawn Dooley.

As a candidate, Diehl criticized federal and state mandates put in place during the COVID-19 pandemic and continuously supported workers and first responders being fired for not taking the vaccine. He is a proponent of parents who want to decide for their children whether or not they would like a vaccine.

At the state party convention on May 21, Diehl was officially endorsed by the Massachusetts Republican Party with 71% of the delegates' votes. He won the Republican nomination on September 6. On November 8, Attorney General of Massachusetts and Democratic nominee Maura Healey defeated Diehl in the general election.

== Electoral history ==
United States Senate election in Massachusetts general election results by county, 2018: Warren—70–80% Warren—60–70% Warren—50–60% Diehl—40–50%

2010 Massachusetts House of Representatives 7th Plymouth district election
Party	Candidate	Votes	%
Republican	Geoff Diehl	8,553	51.24
Democratic	Allen McCarthy (incumbent)	8,132	48.72
Write-in		6	0.04
Total votes		16,691	100.00
Republican gain from Democratic			

2012 Massachusetts House of Representatives 7th Plymouth district election
Party	Candidate	Votes	%
Republican	Geoff Diehl (incumbent)	10,942	54.2
Democratic	Robert L. Toomey, Jr.	9,232	45.7
Write-in		25	0.1
Total votes		20,199	100.00
Republican hold			

2014 Massachusetts House of Representatives 7th Plymouth district election
Party	Candidate	Votes	%
Republican	Geoff Diehl (incumbent)	11,528	99.2
Write-in		92	0.8
Total votes		11,620	100.0
Republican hold			

2015 Massachusetts Senate 2nd Bristol and Plymouth district special election
Party	Candidate	Votes	%
Democratic	Michael Brady	14,397	56.9
Republican	Geoff Diehl	10,245	40.5
Independent	Anna Raduc	649	2.6
Write-in		10	0.0
Total votes		25,301	100.0
Democratic hold			

2016 Massachusetts House of Representatives 7th Plymouth district election
Party	Candidate	Votes	%
Republican	Geoff Diehl (Incumbent)	17,088	99.2
Write-in		144	0.2
Total votes		17,232	100.0
Republican hold			

2018 United States Senate election in Massachusetts Republican primary
Party	Candidate	Votes	%
Republican	Geoff Diehl	144,043	55.2
Republican	John Kingston	69,636	26.7
Republican	Beth Lindstrom	46,693	17.9%
Write-in		798	0.2
Total votes		261,170	100.0

2018 United States Senate election in Massachusetts
Party	Candidate	Votes	%
Democratic	Elizabeth Warren (incumbent)	1,633,371	60.34
Republican	Geoff Diehl	979,210	36.17
Independent	Shiva Ayyadurai	91,710	3.39
Write-in		2,799	0.10
Total votes		2,707,090	100.00
Democratic hold			

2022 Massachusetts gubernatorial election Republican primary
Party	Candidate	Votes	%
Republican	Geoff Diehl	149,800	55.3
Republican	Chris Doughty	120,418	44.4
Write-in		769	0.3
Total votes		270,987	100.0

2022 Massachusetts gubernatorial election
Party	Candidate	Votes	%
Democratic	Maura Healey	1,584,403	63.74
Republican	Geoff Diehl	859,343	34.57
Libertarian	Kevin Reed	39,244	1.58
Write-in		2,806	0.11
Total votes		2,485,796	100.00
Democratic gain from Republican			

== Personal life ==
Before he entered politics, Diehl was a member of the Whitman Finance Committee. He remains a member of the MetroSouth Chamber of Commerce and South Shore Chamber of Commerce. Diehl is also an Eagle Scout. Diehl and his wife, KathyJo, have two daughters. They live in Whitman, Massachusetts.

Party political offices
Preceded by Scott Brown	Republican nominee for U.S. Senator from Massachusetts (Class 1); 2018	Succeeded by John Deaton
Preceded by Charlie Baker	Republican nominee for Governor of Massachusetts; 2022	Succeeded by Mike Minogue
