= Alyson Sullivan-Almeida =

American politician

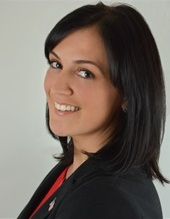

Member of the Massachusetts House of Representatives from the 7th Plymouth district
- Incumbent
- Assumed office January 2, 2019
- Preceded by: Geoff Diehl

Personal details
- Born: Alyson Marie Sullivan; February 7, 1988 (age 38)
- Party: Republican
- Spouse: George Almeida (m. 2022)
- Education: Suffolk University (BS); New England Law Boston (JD)

Alyson Marie Sullivan-Almeida (nee Sullivan, born February 7, 1988) is an American politician who is a Republican member of the Massachusetts House of Representatives. A resident of Abington, she was elected as a Republican to represent the 7th Plymouth district. Sullivan-Almeida was elected after Representative Geoff Diehl decided to run against Elizabeth Warren in the 2018 U.S. Senate election – facing opposition only twice since her initial election. Sullivan-Almeida is also the daughter of former State Representative and ATF Director Michael Sullivan.

Sullivan-Almeida is considered one of the staunchest conservatives in the Massachusetts house, specifically for her support for Flock cameras, endorsement of Mike Minogue in the 2026 Massachusetts gubernatorial election, and for upholding her father's legacy.

== Committee assignments ==
For the 2025–26 Session, Sullivan-Almeida sits on the following committees in the House:

- Ranking Minority, House Committee on Intergovernmental Affairs
- Ranking Minority, Joint Committee on Children, Families and Persons with Disabilities
- House Committee on Ways and Means
- Joint Committee on Education
- Joint Committee on the Judiciary
- Joint Committee on Ways and Means

For the 2023–24 Session, Sullivan-Almeida sat on the following committees in the House:

- Ranking Minority, Joint Committee on Mental Health, Substance Use and Recovery
- House Committee on Ways and Means
- Joint Committee on Children, Families and Persons with Disabilities
- Joint Committee on the Judiciary
- Joint Committee on Ways and Means

For the 2021–22 Session, Sullivan-Almeida sat on the following committees in the House:

- Ranking Minority, Joint Committee on Mental Health, Substance Use and Recovery
- House Committee on Post Audit and Oversight
- Joint Committee on Children, Families and Persons with Disabilities
- Joint Committee on the Judiciary

For the 2019–20 Session, Sullivan-Almeida sat on the following committees in the House:

- House Committee on Personnel and Administration
- Joint Committee on Mental Health, Substance Use and Recovery
- Joint Committee on the Judiciary

== Task Forces and Commissions ==
Sullivan-Almeida is involved in the following task forces and commissions:

- Sponsor, Permanent Commission on Sexual Assault and Domestic Violence Service Standards
- Sponsor, Special Commission on Safety of Blind Persons
- Sponsor, Foundation Budget Review Commission
- Sponsor, Sexual Assault Counselor Task Force
- Sponsor, Internet Use by Sex Offenders Task Force
- Sponsor, Educational Unfunded Mandate Task Force

== Electoral history ==
2024 Election for Massachusetts' 7th Plymouth House District
Party	Candidate	Votes	%
Republican	Alyson Sullivan-Almeida	18,565	98.8
Write-In	Others	229	1.2

2022 Election for Massachusetts' 7th Plymouth House District
Party	Candidate	Votes	%
Republican	Alyson Sullivan-Almeida	12,083	75.3
Workers' Party	Brandon J. Griffin	3,945	24.6
Write-In	Others	23	0.1

2020 Election for Massachusetts' 7th Plymouth House District
Party	Candidate	Votes	%
Republican	Alyson Sullivan	18,369	99.1
Write-In	Others	173	0.9

2018 Election for Massachusetts' 7th Plymouth House District
Party	Candidate	Votes	%
Republican	Alyson Sullivan	10,263	55.80
Democratic	Alex Bezanson	8,130	44.20
Write-In	Others	13	0.10

== See also ==
- 2019–2020 Massachusetts legislature
- 2021–2022 Massachusetts legislature

Massachusetts House of Representatives
Preceded by Geoff Diehl	Member of the Massachusetts House of Representatives from the 7th Plymouth district 2019–present	Incumbent
