= Ronald Whitney =

Ronald Whitney may refer to:

- Ron Whitney (born 1942), American hurdler
- Ronald Whitney (politician), member of the Massachusetts House of Representatives 1995–1997
