= Ripoff =

Unfavorable financial transaction offered or taken

A ripoff (or rip-off) is a grossly unfavorable financial transaction. It originated as slang and has entered into standard English usage as a business term.

Usually it refers to an incident in which a person is overcharged for something or receives goods or services not of the standard expected for the price. A ripoff is usually distinguished from a scam in that a scam involves wrongdoing such as a fraud; a ripoff may be considered excessive, but it is not illegal.

== See also ==
- Rip-off Britain
- Spin-off
- Knock-off
- Plagiarism
- Mockbuster
