= Wayne Budd =

American lawyer (born 1941)

United States Associate Attorney General
- In office 1992–1993
- President: George H. W. Bush
- Preceded by: Frank Keating
- Succeeded by: Webster Hubbell

United States Attorney for the District of Massachusetts
- In office April 18, 1989 – April 14, 1992
- President: George H. W. Bush
- Preceded by: Frank L. McNamara Jr.
- Succeeded by: Donald K. Stern

Personal details
- Born: November 18, 1941 (age 84) Springfield, Massachusetts, U.S.
- Education: Boston College; Wayne State University Law School

Wayne Budd (born November 18, 1941) is senior counsel at Goodwin Procter, in the firm's Litigation Department, where he specializes in advising clients on business and commercial litigation matters. Past senior executive vice president and general counsel, U.S., of John Hancock Financial Services, Inc., a division of Manulife Financial. He was responsible for directing all of the company's legal activities as well as overseeing the compliance, human resources, governmental affairs and community relations functions for the company.

Before joining Hancock, Budd was President-New England at Bell Atlantic Corporation (now Verizon Communications), where, among other duties, he was responsible for regulatory and legislative functions for the New England Region. Before his tenure at Bell Atlantic, he had been a senior partner at Goodwin Procter, a Boston law firm.

From 1979 to 1989, he served with the law firm of Budd, Wiley, & Richlin.

From 1989 to 1992, he had been U.S. Attorney for the District of Massachusetts, serving as the Bay State's chief federal prosecutor and representing the federal government in matters involving civil litigation.

President George H. W. Bush appointed Budd to serve as Associate Attorney General of the United States, in 1992. He oversaw the Civil Rights, Environmental, Tax, Civil and Antitrust divisions at the Department of Justice, as well as the Federal Bureau of Prisons.

Budd also served on the U.S. Sentencing Commission, appointed in 1994 by President Bill Clinton.

He is a past president of the Massachusetts Bar Association and the Massachusetts Black Lawyers Association.

Budd is a graduate of Boston College and received his J.D. degree from Wayne State University Law School. His daughter is Kimberly S. Budd, Chief Justice of the Supreme Judicial Court of Massachusetts.

Legal offices
Preceded by Frank Keating	United States Associate Attorney General; 1992–1993	Succeeded by Webster Hubbell
Preceded by Frank L. McNamara, Jr.	United States Attorney for the District of Massachusetts; 1989–1992	Succeeded by Donald K. Stern
