= Donald K. Stern =

American attorney

United States Attorney for the District of Massachusetts
- In office November 19, 1993 – June 2, 2001
- President: Bill Clinton
- Preceded by: Wayne Budd
- Succeeded by: Michael Sullivan

Personal details
- Occupation: Attorney

Donald K. Stern is an American attorney who served as the U.S. Attorney for Massachusetts from 1993 to 2001. He was best known for prosecuting mob figures, including fugitive Winter Hill Gang leader James "Whitey" Bulger and his partner, Stephen "The Rifleman" Flemmi. In 2001 he went into private practice as a Partner in the Boston office of Bingham Dana and Gould, which later merged into Bingham McCutchen LLP.

In 2002, he was chair of a blue-ribbon commission appointed by the Acting Governor of Massachusetts, Jane M. Swift, to investigate allegations involving the Suffolk County Sheriff's Department.

In 2008 he joined the firm of Cooley Godward Kronish LLP as a Partner in their Boston office. He teaches a course called Government Lawyer at Harvard Law School.

In May 2013, he left Cooley to join Affiliated Monitors as Managing Director, Corporate Monitoring and Consulting Services.

In May 2013 he also joined Yurko, Salvesen & Remz, P.C., a boutique litigation law firm in Boston, as Of Counsel, where his practice focuses on internal investigations, white collar defense, and business litigation.
