= Allen McCarthy =

American politician (born 1970)

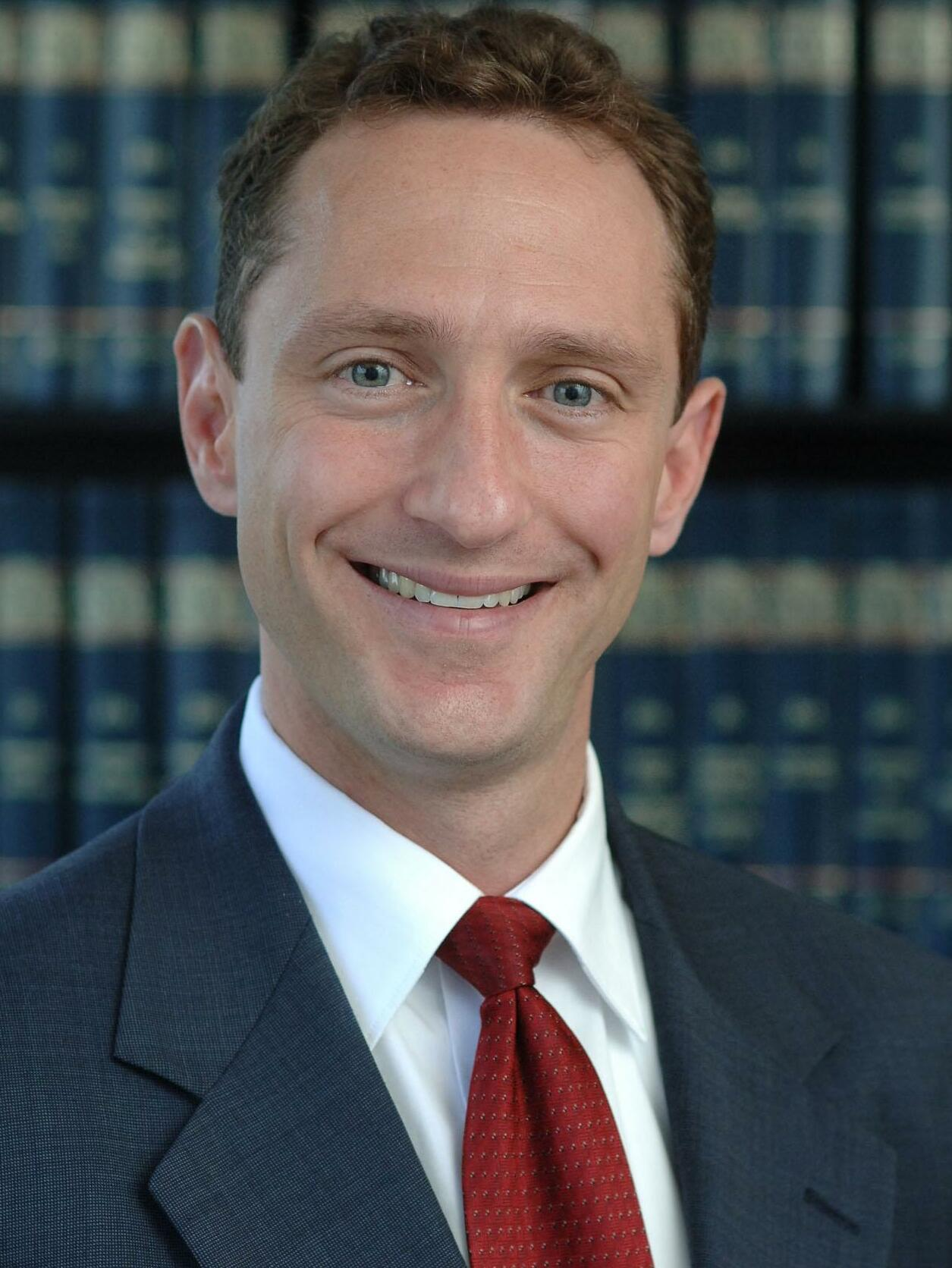

Member of the Massachusetts House of Representatives from the 7th Plymouth district
- In office January 3, 2007 – January 5, 2011
- Preceded by: Kathleen Teahan
- Succeeded by: Geoff Diehl

Personal details
- Born: February 24, 1970 (age 56) Boston, Massachusetts, U.S.
- Party: Democratic
- Spouse: Diane
- Children: 3
- Education: Boston College (BA, JD)

Allen J. McCarthy (born February 24, 1970) is an American lawyer and politician who represented the 7th Plymouth District in the Massachusetts House of Representatives from 2007 to 2011.

== Early life and education ==
He was born in Boston and graduated from East Bridgewater High School in 1988. He graduated from Boston College with a Bachelor of Arts degree in political science in 1992 and from Boston College Law School with a Juris Doctor in 1995.

== Legal career ==
From 1995 to 2000, he served as an assistant district attorney in the Middlesex County District Attorney's Office. He also served as the District Court Supervisor for Lowell District Court. From 2000 to 2008 he worked in private practice in Boston and in South Shore as a litigation attorney.

He formerly served as the counsel to the School Transportation Association of Massachusetts. He practices law in West Bridgewater.

== Political career ==
He served in the Massachusetts House of Representatives as a Democrat representing the 7th Plymouth district from 2007 to 2011.

== Personal life ==
He and his wife Diane have three children. They live in East Bridgewater.
