= Carmen Ortiz =

American attorney and college instructor

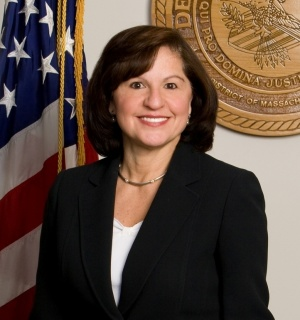
- Official portrait, 2009

United States Attorney for the District of Massachusetts
- In office November 6, 2009 – January 14, 2017
- Appointed by: Barack Obama
- Preceded by: Michael Sullivan
- Succeeded by: Andrew Lelling

Personal details
- Born: Carmen Milagros Ortiz; January 5, 1956 (age 70) New York City, New York, U.S.
- Party: Democratic
- Spouse: Thomas Dolan
- Education: Adelphi University (BBA); George Washington University (JD)

Carmen Milagros Ortiz (born January 5, 1956) is an attorney, college instructor, and former United States Attorney for the District of Massachusetts.

In 2009, she was nominated to the position by President Barack Obama. She succeeded Michael Sullivan in that position, with Michael J. Loucks serving as the interim U.S. Attorney between Sullivan's resignation and Ortiz's confirmation. Noteworthy prosecutions by her office include those of Whitey Bulger, Tarek Mehanna, and Dzhokhar Tsarnaev, as well as the controversial prosecution of Aaron Swartz, which prompted his suicide.

In December 2016, Ortiz announced that she would step down from her post in January. Her announcement was not unexpected, because incoming president Donald Trump had the authority to name new U.S. Attorneys.

== Early life and education ==
Born in New York City to Puerto Rican parents, Ortiz grew up in East Harlem. Ortiz has said that, as a child, watching Perry Mason on television inspired her to become a lawyer. After graduating from The Saint Agnes School in 1974, Ortiz earned her B.B.A. from Adelphi University in 1978, working in her family's gift shop during her years there. Ortiz later earned her J.D. at George Washington University's National Law Center in 1981. In the summer of 1980, Ortiz interned in the Public Integrity Section of the United States Department of Justice with Eric Holder, who later became U.S. Attorney General. She also worked on judicial reform in Guatemala with Harvard professor, former Watergate prosecutor, and former deputy attorney general Philip Heymann.

== Legal career ==
From 1981 to 1983, Ortiz was an attorney with the United States Department of Justice Criminal Division. Ortiz served as Assistant District Attorney in Middlesex County, Massachusetts, in two stints: 1983 to 1988 and 1991 to 1994. In 1988, Ortiz went into the private sector with the Braintree law firm Marinelli & Morisi, where she would work until 1989. Ortiz also coordinated the Center for Criminal Justice at Harvard Law School from 1988 to 1991. In 1990, after being appointed by NFL Commissioner Paul Tagliabue, she served on a commission that investigated allegations of sexual harassment against members of the New England Patriots. In 1997, Ortiz became an Assistant U.S. Attorney.

In September 2017, Ortiz joined the Boston-based law firm of Anderson & Kreiger. In December 2019, it was announced she will be made a partner at the firm.

== United States Attorney ==
In May 2009, Senators Ted Kennedy and John Kerry recommended Ortiz to President Obama for the vacant United States Attorney position in the District of Massachusetts. On September 18, Obama nominated Ortiz for the position. On November 5, the United States Senate confirmed her appointment by unanimous consent.

Ortiz was both the first woman and the first Hispanic to serve as United States Attorney for the District of Massachusetts.

Ortiz was rebuffed in several harshly worded rulings by judges on cases brought by her office. These cases were accused of "stretching the evidence" and "gross exaggeration" by federal judge Judith Dein, an "overkill" and "unusual prosecution" by federal judge Douglas Woodlock and being "over the top" by federal judge Nancy Gertner.

=== White collar cases ===
In 2011, Ortiz's office was responsible for the prosecution of GlaxoSmithKline general counsel Lauren Stevens. Ultimately, the court dismissed the case, ruling that "it would be a miscarriage of justice to permit this case to go to the jury."

On March 23, 2012, Ortiz's office secured grand jury indictments against former state Probation Commissioner John J. O’Brien and two of his former deputies, Elizabeth Tavares and William Burke III, for their involvement in running a sham hiring system in which friends and family members of legislators and politically connected job seekers were hired over more qualified applicants. Each faces one count of racketeering conspiracy and 10 counts of mail fraud for sending rejection letters to applicants they knew they were never going to consider. If convicted, they face up to 20 years in prison on each of the 11 counts. Ortiz said the indictments are “one step in an ongoing investigation.”

In 2015, Ortiz was expected to pursue $1.1 million 'Insider Trading' scam involving two Indian Americans Iftikar Ahmed & Amit Kanodia which involved sharing of insider information leading to illegal gains in the NYSE.

=== Whitey Bulger case ===
Carmen Ortiz's office led the prosecution of mobster Whitey Bulger. On July 6, 2011, Bulger was arraigned in federal court. He pleaded not guilty to 48 charges, including 19 counts of murder, extortion, money laundering, obstruction of justice, perjury, narcotics distribution and weapons violations.

Ortiz's office also led the prosecution of Bulger's girlfriend Catherine Greig. In March 2012, Greig plead guilty to conspiracy to harbor a fugitive, identity fraud, and conspiracy to commit identity fraud. On June 12, 2012, she was sentenced to eight years' confinement in a federal penitentiary.

=== Terrorism cases ===
Carmen Ortiz led the prosecution of American pharmacist Tarek Mehanna, who was accused of, among other crimes, translating and posting online materials described by prosecutors as Al Qaeda propaganda. Mehanna's lawyers argued that he never tried to join an armed group and never tried to hurt anyone, and that his internet activities were protected under the U.S. First Amendment. In April 2012, Mehanna was sentenced in federal court in Boston on four terrorism-related charges and three others related to lying to agents of the FBI and other U.S. federal officials.

=== Mistaken identity case ===
Ortiz came under fire after her office was involved in the January 19, 2013 arrest of a man who reportedly "looks very much like" a wanted drug suspect. The man was released by a federal magistrate the following day after prosecutors admitted "significant doubt" that the arrested man was indeed the suspect.

=== Donald Gonczy case ===
Ortiz was "admonished by a federal appeals court in 2004 for advocating a harsher jail term for a fraud defendant than she had promised him in a plea-bargain agreement." In a plea deal, Ortiz had agreed to leniency, but she "substantively argued" for a harsher sentence. The Appeals Court ruled that Ortiz "violated the plea agreement [her office] entered into with Gonczy," and it vacated the sentence.

=== Prosecution of Aaron Swartz ===
Ortiz's office prosecuted computer programmer and Internet activist Aaron Swartz. In 2011, Swartz was arrested for unauthorized, bulk downloading of free articles from internet archive JSTOR, in violation of the JSTOR's terms of use. In a 2011 press release announcing Swartz's indictment on federal charges, Ortiz said "Stealing is stealing whether you use a computer command or a crowbar, and whether you take documents, data or dollars. It is equally harmful to the victim whether you sell what you have stolen or give it away." After state prosecutors dropped their charges, federal prosecutors filed a superseding indictment adding nine more felony counts, which increased Swartz's maximum criminal exposure to 50 years of imprisonment and $1 million in fines.

The prosecution brought by Ortiz involved what was characterized by numerous critics, such as former White House Counsel John Dean, as "overcharging" and "overzealous" prosecution for the alleged computer crimes.

In all, prosecutors charged Swartz with 13 felony counts, despite the fact that both MIT and JSTOR had chosen not to pursue civil litigation; he faced 30 years of imprisonment. Swartz died by suicide on January 11, 2013, before the case came to trial. More than 60,000 people petitioned the White House to remove Ortiz from office for "overreach." On January 15, 2013, following his suicide, all charges against Swartz were dropped. The next day, Ortiz issued a statement saying that her office had never intended to seek maximum penalties against Aaron Swartz, despite their public statements indicating they would do so, directly leading to his suicide.

However, the same day, Ortiz's husband, IBM executive Tom Dolan, scolded the Swartz family for issuing a statement criticizing the prosecutors and MIT. He rationalized: "Truly incredible that in their own son's obit, they blame others for his death and make no mention of the 6-month offer." Esquire writer Charlie Pierce replied, "the glibness with which her husband and her defenders toss off a 'mere' six months in federal prison, low-security or not, is a further indication that something is seriously out of whack with the way our prosecutors think these days."

Massachusetts Lawyers Weekly published an op-ed piece by Massachusetts criminal defense attorney Harvey Silverglate about the case. He said attorneys familiar with the case had told him the Middlesex County District Attorney's office had planned for Swartz's case to be "continued without a finding, with Swartz duly admonished and then returned to civil society to continue his pioneering electronic work in a less legally questionable manner." "Under such a disposition," Silverglate later told CNET's Declan McCullagh, "the charge is held in abeyance ("continued") without any verdict ("without a finding"). The defendant is on probation for a period of a few months up to maybe a couple of years at the most; if the defendant does not get into further legal trouble, the charge is dismissed, and the defendant has no criminal record. This is what the lawyers expected to happen when Swartz was arrested. But then the feds took over...." "Tragedy intervened," Silverglate wrote, "when Ortiz's office took over the case to send 'a message'."

Boston's WBUR reported in February 2013 that Ortiz was expected to testify before the House Committee on Oversight and Government Reform's probe into the handling of the Aaron Swartz case. The Department of Justice gave a private briefing about the case to the House Committee, and subsequently, in March 2013, Attorney General Eric Holder defended Ortiz's aggressive prosecution before the Senate Judiciary Committee, terming it "a good use of prosecutorial discretion."

In January 2015, two years after Swartz's death, the White House declined to act on the petition to remove Ortiz from office.

=== Motel Caswell confiscation case ===
Ortiz's office sought to confiscate the Motel Caswell in Tewksbury, Massachusetts from its owner, Russ Caswell. Prosecutors contended that, despite the fact that Caswell himself had never been charged with any crime, his property was subject to civil forfeiture as a long-term site of criminal activity. Ortiz's spokeswoman said "The government believed that this was an important case, not only for the town of Tewksbury, which has been plagued for decades by the criminal activity at Motel Caswell, but because of the important deterrent message it sends to others who may turn a blind eye to crime occurring at their place of business." The property had been the location of 15 drug crimes between 1994 and 2008, which Caswell said is small considering that he rents about 14,000 rooms per year. Caswell was represented by the Institute for Justice, a non-profit libertarian public interest law firm that frequently intervenes in asset forfeiture cases.

On January 24, 2013, U.S. Magistrate Judge Judith Dein sided with Caswell. In a written decision, Dein dismissed the government's forfeiture action, ruling that Caswell, "who was trying to eke out an income from a business located in a drug-infested area that posed great risks to the safety of him and his family, took all reasonable steps to prevent crime. The Government’s resolution of the crime problem should not be to simply take his Property." In the ruling, the court criticized the prosecution for "stretching the evidence" and engaging in "gross exaggeration."

After considering an appeal, her office announced that in March 2013 that they would not pursue the matter further.

=== Boston Marathon bombings ===
Ortiz's office led the investigation into the Boston Marathon bombing. On June 27, 2013, Ortiz unveiled a grand jury's 30-count indictment against suspect Dzhokhar Tsarnaev. On July 10, 2013, Tsarnaev pleaded not guilty to all charges.

On August 8, 2013, two of Tsarnaev's friends were indicted on federal obstruction of justice charges. Another Ortiz prosecution, this time of Tamerlan Tsarnaev's friend Khairullozhon Matanov who pleaded guilty rather than face 20 years in prison, has been described as overzealous.

=== Martin Gottesfeld case ===
In 2017 Ortiz was prosecuting Gottesfeld under the Computer Fraud and Abuse Act for taking the Boston Children's Hospital website down during an online donation drive to protest the hospital's treatment of Justina Pelletier. Pelletier was taken from her family by the hospital under a controversial Massachusetts law.

Martin Gottesfeld claimed responsibility for an attack by Anonymous that prevented the Boston Children's Hospital (and other treatment facilities) from receiving donations for limited period of time with denial-of-service attacks that briefly prevented access to a public website or server. He has been held for trial since February 2016 and had reported that he was on a hunger strike and claimed that he had been put in solitary confinement as punishment for the hunger strike.

=== Teamsters picketing case ===
In 2014, Ortiz prosecuted 5 Teamsters activists for picketing the Bravo Network show Top Chef for extortion and racketeering in response to their picketing the show for not hiring union drivers.

Four of the five charged were acquitted, with the remaining member pleading guilty to lesser charges.

== Recognition ==
In 2011, the Boston Globe named her "Bostonian of the Year" for her prosecution of "corruption and white-collar crime". Boston magazine labeled her the third most powerful person in Boston in 2012 for her corruption prosecutions of former Speaker of the Massachusetts House of Representatives Salvatore DiMasi, former state Senator Dianne Wilkerson, and former Boston City Councilor Chuck Turner.

== Personal life ==
Ortiz has two daughters and is married to IBM executive Thomas J. Dolan; her first husband, Michael Vittorio Morisi, died in 2000.

Ortiz reportedly considered a campaign for Governor of Massachusetts, but she denied interest in such a run. This decision also came on the heels of the unpopular Swartz prosecution, with other critics describing Ortiz's professional record as marked by a "hands-off leadership style" and "overzealousness."

Legal offices
Preceded by Michael Sullivan	U.S. Attorney for the United States District Court for the District of Massachusetts; 2009–2017	Succeeded by William D. Weinreb (Acting)
