= Tarek Mehanna =

American pharmacist

- Born: Pennsylvania, U.S.
- Occupation: Pharmacist
- Known for: his translation of jihadist documents resulted in a conviction of providing material support to terrorism

Tarek Mehanna is a pharmacist convicted of conspiracy to provide material support to al Qaeda, providing material support to terrorists (and conspiracy to do so), conspiracy to commit murder in a foreign country, conspiracy to make false statements to the FBI, and two counts of making false statements. He was arrested on October 21, 2009. He was convicted on December 20, 2011 and sentenced to 17.5 years in federal prison on April 12, 2012. He was incarcerated at ADX Florence in Colorado, US. and was released in December 2023.

== Early life ==
Mehanna was born in Pennsylvania and grew up in Sudbury, Massachusetts, a small town near Boston. His parents emigrated to the United States from Egypt in 1980.

== Terrorist activities ==
In 2004, Mehanna spent two weeks in Yemen, where prosecutors proved that he tried but failed to seek out training in a militant training camp, with the aim of going to Iraq fighting with Iraqis against the US-led invasion and occupation. When he returned to the US, Mehanna began to translate and post online materials described by prosecutors as Al-Qaeda propaganda. Mehanna has said that he supports the right of Muslims to defend themselves. His lawyers argued that his internet activities were protected under the U.S. First Amendment.

== Trial and conviction ==
US Attorney Carmen Ortiz led the prosecution of Mehanna. In April 2012, Mehanna was sentenced in federal court in Boston on four terrorism-related charges and three others related to lying to FBI and other U.S. federal officials. Before his sentence was determined, he made a statement described by journalists as "eloquent," and "passionate," the text of which was afterwards widely circulated online.

Following Mehanna's sentencing, the ACLU released a statement saying that the suppression of unpopular ideas is contrary to American values, and that the verdict undermines the First Amendment. Specifically, it stated, "Under the government's theory of the case, ordinary people--including writers and journalists, academic researchers, translators, and even ordinary web surfers--could be prosecuted for researching or translating controversial and unpopular ideas."

Mehanna appealed his case to the First Circuit Court of Appeals but lost the case. Judge Bruce Selya, writing for the 3-judge panel, found for the Government, saying that Mehanna had been "fairly tried, justly convicted, and lawfully sentenced." "We think it virtually unarguable that rational jurors could find that the defendant and his associates went abroad to enlist in a terrorist training camp," the opinion said.

Oral argument for the appeal was held on July 30, 2013, in Boston, and the opinion issued on Nov 13 of that year. At oral argument, Mehanna's side was argued by P. Sabin Willett, and the United States was represented by Liza Collery of the Department of Justice.

Mehanna appealed his case to the Supreme Court on March 17, 2014.

On March 18, 2014, Lyle Denniston of Scotusblog profiled the case, focusing on the Supreme Court appeal. The Supreme Court has the discretion to choose whether or not to review cases from lower courts, and has no obligation to explain these decisions. The Department of Justice's response brief was filed on July 25, 2014.

Denniston reported that Mehanna's lawyers would argue that while Mehanna was philosophically sympathetic to the tenets of al Qaeda, his translation of the documents was spontaneous — was not done at anyone's request, and this meant the translations weren't part of al Qaeda's operations.

On October 6, 2014, the court announced that it declined to review the case, thereby upholding Mehanna's conviction. He was released on December 13, 2023.

== See also ==
- Brandenburg v. Ohio
