= Kathleen Teahan =

American politician

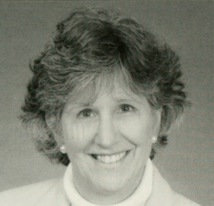

Member of the Massachusetts House of Representatives from the 7th Plymouth district
- In office 1997–2007
- Preceded by: Ronald Whitney
- Succeeded by: Allen McCarthy

Personal details
- Born: June 11, 1947 (age 79) Brockton, Massachusetts, U.S.
- Party: Democratic
- Education: Bridgewater State College

Kathleen M. Teahan (born June 11, 1947) is an American politician. She represented the 7th Plymouth District in the Massachusetts House of Representatives from 1997 to 2007. She resides in Whitman.

== Biography ==
Kathleen M. Teahan was married and had four children. She taught school at the Gordon W. Mitchell Middle School in East Bridgewater and then at Whitman-Hanson Regional High School.

== Achievements ==
During her tenure in office, Teahan was named Legislator of the Month by the Massachusetts Medical Society. Teahan was a member of the Joint Committee on Health Care, and the Joint Committee on State Administration, since her first term. She served on the Committee to Study Adoption, the Committee to Study End-of-Life Issues, the Special Commission on Oral Health, and the Special Commission on Complementary and Alternative Medicine.

She has been a member of the Girl Scout Council of Southeastern Massachusetts Board of Directors and the Whitman-Hanson Citizen Scholarship Foundation.

She has served as the Massachusetts Team Leader for the National Foundation for Women Legislators' partnership with the United States Department of Veterans Affairs to bring national awareness of the Veterans History Project of the Library of Congress American Folklife Center.

== Honors ==
Teahan was honored for her legislative efforts by the Congressional Coalition for Adoption Institute (2003 Congressional Angels in Adoption award), Health Care For All (2002 For the People, Against the Tide Award), and Tufts University School of Dental Medicine (2003 Professional Recognition Award).
