= Massachusetts House of Representatives' 7th Plymouth district =

American legislative district

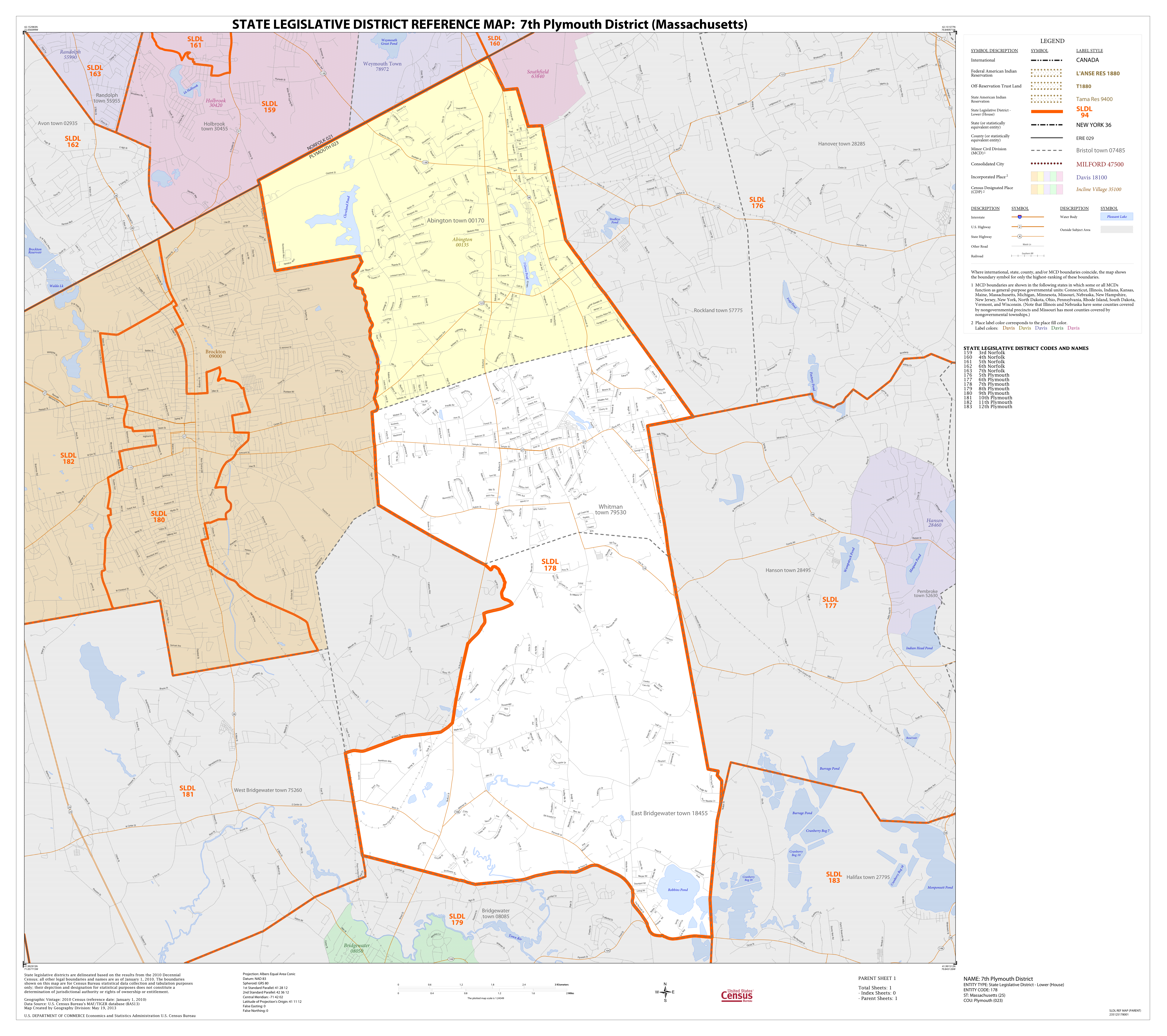
Map of Massachusetts House of Representatives' 7th Plymouth district, based on the 2010 United States census.

Massachusetts House of Representatives' 7th Plymouth district in the United States is one of 160 legislative districts included in the lower house of the Massachusetts General Court. It covers part of Plymouth County. Republican Alyson Sullivan of Abington has represented the district since 2019.

== Towns represented ==
The district includes the following localities:

- Abington
- part of East Bridgewater
- Whitman

The current district geographic boundary overlaps with those of the Massachusetts Senate's Norfolk and Plymouth district, Norfolk, Bristol and Plymouth district, and 2nd Plymouth and Bristol district.

=== Former locales ===
The district previously covered:

- Marion, circa 1872
- Wareham, circa 1872

== Representatives ==
- John M. Kinney, circa 1858
- Marshall E. Simmons, circa 1859
- John W. Delano, circa 1888
- Morrill S. Ryder, circa 1920
- Adolph Johnson, circa 1951
- Charles A. Mackenzie, Jr., circa 1975
- Andrew Card
- Emmet Hayes
- Michael J. Sullivan
- Ronald Whitney
- Kathleen Teahan
- Allen McCarthy
- Geoff Diehl
- Alyson M. Sullivan, 2019–present

== See also ==
- List of Massachusetts House of Representatives elections
- Other Plymouth County districts of the Massachusetts House of Representatives: 1st, 2nd, 3rd, 4th, 5th, 6th, 8th, 9th, 10th, 11th, 12th
- List of Massachusetts General Courts
- List of former districts of the Massachusetts House of Representatives

== Images ==
Portraits of legislators

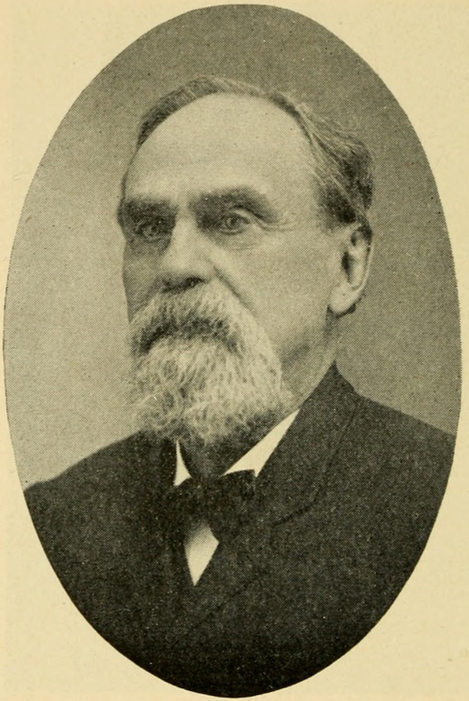
Joseph Beals

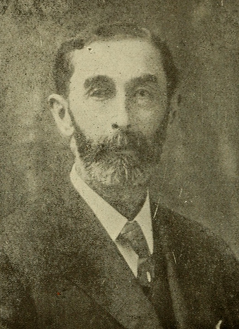
William Haskins

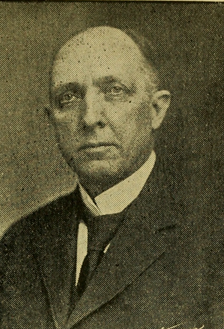
Morrill Ryder

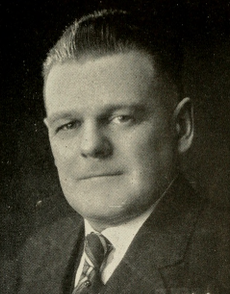
Kendrick Washburn

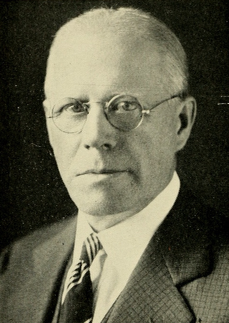
Adolph Johnson

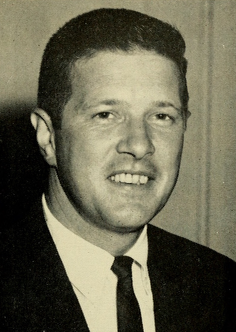
David Flynn

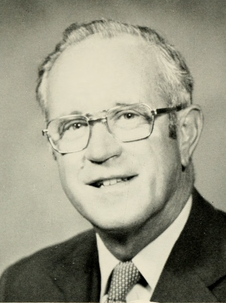
Charles MacKenzie

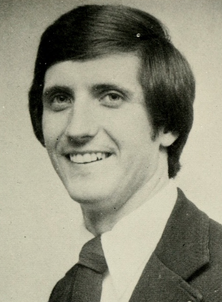
Andrew Card

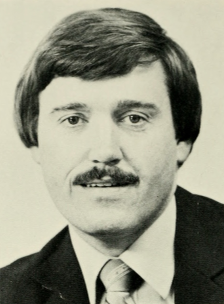
Robert Emmet Hayes

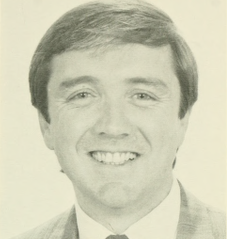
Michael Sullivan

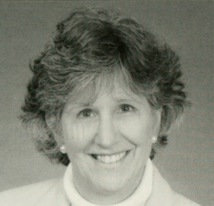
Kathleen Teahan

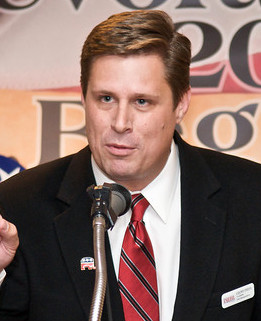
Geoff Diehl
