= Christopher Donelan =

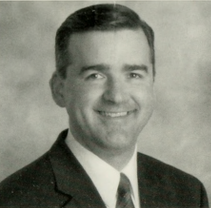
- Portrait of Christopher Donelan

Sheriff of Franklin County, Massachusetts
- In office 2011–2025
- Preceded by: Frederick Macdonald
- Succeeded by: Lori Streeter

Member of the Massachusetts House of Representatives from the 2nd Franklin district
- In office 2003–2011
- Preceded by: John Merrigan
- Succeeded by: Denise Andrews

Personal details
- Born: December 25, 1964 (age 61) Athol, Massachusetts
- Party: Democratic
- Education: Westfield State College; American International College
- Occupation: Police Officer; Probation Officer; Politician

Christopher J. Donelan (born December 25, 1964, in Athol, Massachusetts) is an American law enforcement officer and politician who is the former Sheriff of Franklin County, Massachusetts. A Democrat, he served as a member of the Massachusetts House of Representatives from 2003 to 2011.

Donelan served as Sheriff of Franklin County, Massachusetts from 2011 to 2025. As Sheriff, Donelan championed criminal justice reform, community engagement, and rehabilitation. He emphasized reducing recidivism by offering educational and vocational programs to incarcerated individuals. Donelan also advocated for progressive policies, including alternatives to incarceration for non-violent offenders, and worked to improve transparency and accountability within the Sheriff's office.

After serving as Franklin County sheriff, Chris Donelan was suspended from his role as director of the East Falmouth Police Academy following an investigation into alleged misconduct. The Municipal Police Training Committee, housed under the Massachusetts Executive Office of Public Safety and Security, placed Donelan and other academy leaders on leave while the investigation is ongoing. Specific details of the allegations have not been disclosed. The MPTC has emphasized its commitment to maintaining integrity and professionalism within the academy.
