= Arbella Insurance Group =

Property and casualty insurance company

Arbella Insurance
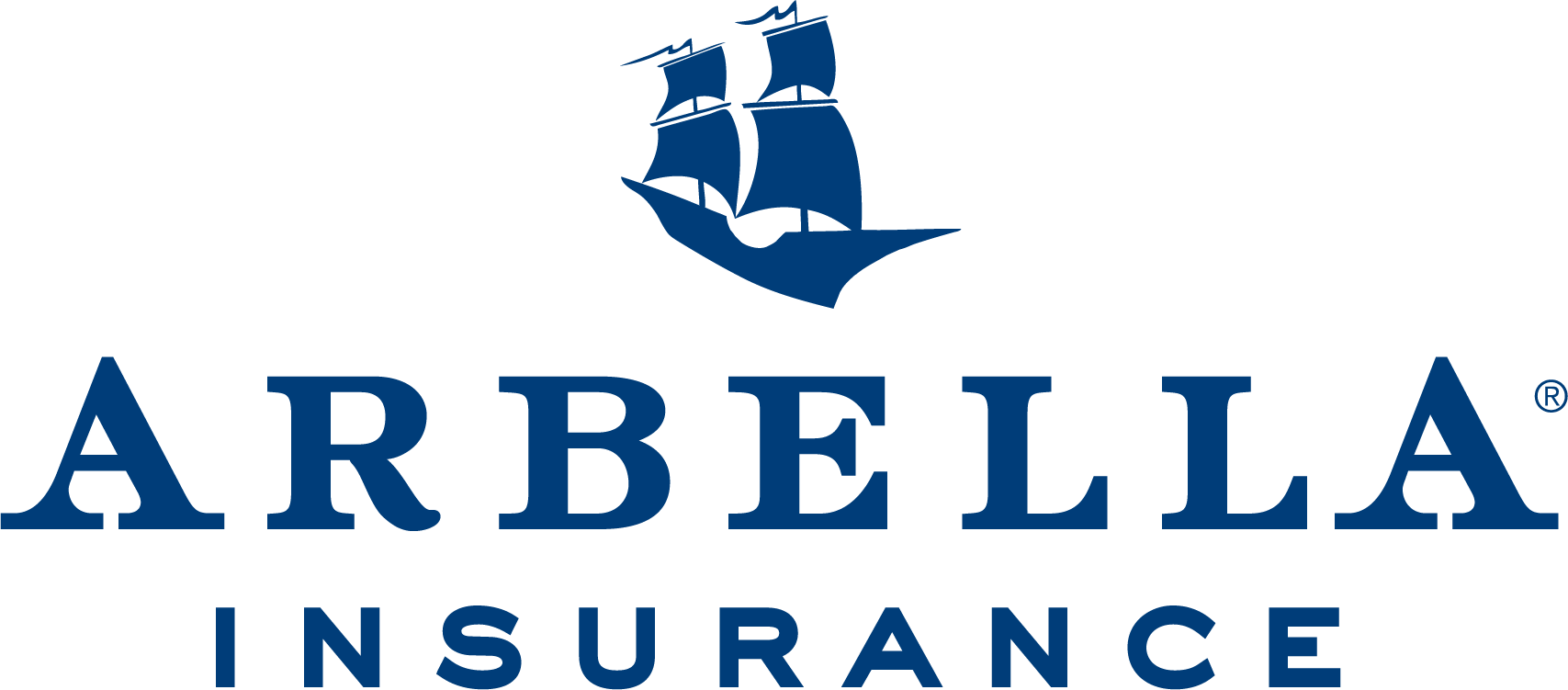
- Company type: Mutual
- Industry: Insurance
- Founded: 1988
- Founder: John F. Donohue and Francis X. Bellotti
- Headquarters: Quincy, Massachusetts, United States
- Number of locations: 5
- Area served: New England
- Key people: Paul Brady (CEO), John Donohue (Co-founder, President of the Arbella Insurance Foundation, and Chairman of the Board) Francis X. Bellotti (Co-founder)
- Services: Insurance
- Website: www.arbella.com

Arbella Insurance Group is a regional property and casualty insurance company headquartered in Quincy, Massachusetts. It provides business and personal insurance in Massachusetts and Connecticut, as well as business insurance in Rhode Island and New Hampshire.

== History ==
In 1988, Kemper Insurance Group announced its intentions to withdraw from the Massachusetts auto market. A key piece of legislation was needed to make the company solvent in the Massachusetts market, and within 30 days, the key piece of legislation needed to form Arbella was passed.

In 2008, the Massachusetts Commissioner of Insurance decided to “discontinue the practice of state-set rates for private passenger auto insurance and allow insurers to propose rates.” A monumental occurrence for Massachusetts insurers, this decision came after the ill-fated 1977 attempt to allow full competition in the private passenger auto market.

John Donohue, co-founder of Arbella, spoke about how his company would fare in this new climate of competition. He reported that Arbella was “not only ready to adapt, but also to succeed and prosper in this new business environment.”

On June 1, 2025, Arbella appointed its Executive Vice President and Head of Claim, Paul Brady, as Chief Executive Officer, to succeed John Donohue. Donohue announced he would be stepping down in early 2025 and is continuing in his role as Chairman of the Board and CEO of the Arbella Insurance Foundation (“Foundation”).

Donohue has served as Chairman of the Board of Directors since the company’s creation in 1988, and as CEO of the Arbella Insurance Group for the last 24 years. Donohue’s background in law, policy, claims, liability, and marketing positioned him as an industry-leading CEO and a charismatic leader known by agents and employees across New England.

== Current Operations ==
Since its inception, Arbella Insurance Group has used the independent agent model. This is opposed to several national insurance companies known as “direct writers,” who allow prospective customers to receive a quote instantly online, and then to purchase their insurance policies the same way. The firm serves as a carrier, partnering with independent insurance agencies throughout New England to write lines of commercial and personal insurance offers for its customers.

== Charitable Contributions ==
The Arbella Insurance Foundation was founded in 2005 to support nonprofit organizations that have a significant impact on the people and communities served by the Arbella Insurance Group. It supports organizations working in culture and education, health and wellness, hunger and homelessness, inclusion and incorporation, youth and families, and social justice.

Recognized as one of the Boston Business Journal’s “Top Charitable Contributors” for 16 consecutive years, the mission of Arbella’s Foundation is to engage in activities and to support not-for-profit organizations that have a significant positive impact on the people and communities served by Arbella.

== Sponsorships ==
The Arbella Insurance Group prides itself in partnering with local organizations that share its commitment to New England communities, including The Jimmy Fund and Dana-Farber Cancer Institute, Special Olympics Massachusetts, Impact Melanoma, the Boston Bruins, New England Free Jacks, New England Revolution, and many more.

== Arbella Insurance Group Awards ==
- Best Places to Work, Boston Business Journal, 2025
- Best Places to Work, Boston Business Journal, 2024
- Insurance Provider Gold Recipient, Banker & Tradesman's "Best of 2024"
- Best Places to Work - #1, Boston Business Journal, 2023
- Best Places to Work, Boston Business Journal, 2022
- Best Places to Work, Boston Business Journal, 2021
- Best Places to Work, Boston Business Journal, 2020
- Boston Red Sox Jimmy Fund Award, The Jimmy Fund, 2019
- Best Places to Work, Boston Business Journal, 2019
- Best Places to Work, Boston Business Journal, 2018
- Best Places to Work, Boston Business Journal, 2017
- Best Places to Work in Boston, Boston Business Journal, 2016
- Best Places to Work, Boston Business Journal, 2015
- Best Places to Work, Boston Business Journal, 2014
- Best Places to Work, Boston Business Journal, 2013
- Best Places to Work, Boston Business Journal, 2012
- Best Places to Work, Boston Business Journal, 2011
- Best Places to Work, Boston Business Journal, 2010
- Best Places to Work, Boston Business Journal, 2009

== Arbella Insurance Foundation Awards ==
- Top Charitable Contributor, Boston Business Journal, 2024
- Top Charitable Contributor, Boston Business Journal, 2023
- Top Charitable Contributor, Boston Business Journal, 2022
- Top Charitable Contributor, Boston Business Journal, 2021
- Top Charitable Contributor, Boston Business Journal, 2020
- Top Charitable Contributor, Boston Business Journal, 2019
- Top Charitable Contributor, Boston Business Journal, 2018
- Top Charitable Contributor, Boston Business Journal, 2017
- Top Charitable Contributor, Boston Business Journal, 2016
- Top Charitable Contributor, Boston Business Journal, 2015
- Top Charitable Contributor, Boston Business Journal, 2014
- Top Charitable Contributor, Boston Business Journal, 2013
- Top Charitable Contributor, Boston Business Journal, 2012
- Top Charitable Contributor, Boston Business Journal, 2011
- Top Charitable Contributor, Boston Business Journal, 2010
- Top Charitable Contributor, Boston Business Journal, 2009

== Founders ==
- John Donohue
- Frank Bellotti
- John J Mooney
- President and COO from 1988–1994
