= Frank L. McNamara Jr. =

American lawyer

Frank McNamara Jr.

United States Attorney for the District of Massachusetts
- In office April 19, 1987 – January 31, 1989
- President: Ronald Reagan; George H. W. Bush
- Preceded by: Bill Weld
- Succeeded by: Wayne Budd

Personal details
- Born: Francis Luke McNamara Jr. November 4, 1947 (age 78) Providence, Rhode Island
- Party: Republican
- Education: Harvard University (AB); University of Virginia (JD)
- Occupation: Attorney

Francis Luke McNamara Jr. (born November 4, 1947, in Providence, Rhode Island) is an American attorney who served as the United States Attorney for the District of Massachusetts from 1987 to 1989.

== Early life ==
After graduating from Harvard College in 1969, McNamara joined the United States Navy. He served as an intelligence officer during the Vietnam War. He graduated from the University of Virginia School of Law in 1976 and in 1977 was admitted to the Massachusetts bar.

== Legal career ==
From 1977 to 1980, McNamara worked as an associate at Choate, Hall & Stewart. He then became an Assistant General Counsel and Corporate Secretary of the Boston Gas Company. In 1983, McNamara was a founding partner in the law firm of Vena, McNamara, Truelove & Lahey. In April 1987, McNamara was appointed by President Ronald Reagan to serve as the United States Attorney for the District of Massachusetts.

In November 1988, the Justice Department released a report concluding that McNamara had falsely accused his predecessor, William F. Weld, of smoking marijuana. An investigation was then opened to determine whether McNamara had deliberately lied. On January 27, 1989, 28 of his 39 assistant attorneys sent a letter to Attorney General Dick Thornburgh seeking McNamara's "immediate resignation or removal." He resigned on January 31, 1989.

He then returned to private practice and established the law firm of McNamara & Associates.

== Political career ==
In 1982 he was a Republican candidate for Congress in Massachusetts's 8th congressional district. He defeated former State Republican Chairman William Barnstead in the primary 5,429 votes to 4,477. In the general election he lost to Democratic Speaker of the House Tip O'Neill 123,296 votes to 41,370.

In 1984, McNamara was named the first chairman of the Massachusetts chapter of Citizens for America.

In 2011, McNamara was a candidate for Chairman of the Massachusetts Republican Party. He lost to businessman Robert Maginn 51 votes to 21.

== Financial services career ==
From 2003 to 2005, McNamara served as the President of Parkman Shaw & Company, Inc., a Registered Investment Advisor. In April 2006 he became a Managing Director at the wealth management firm of Highmount Capital LLC.

== Personal life ==
McNamara and his wife Elizabeth are the parents of twelve children. He currently resides in Lunenburg, Massachusetts.
