= 2018 United States Senate election in Massachusetts =

- November 6, 2018
- Turnout: 59.17%
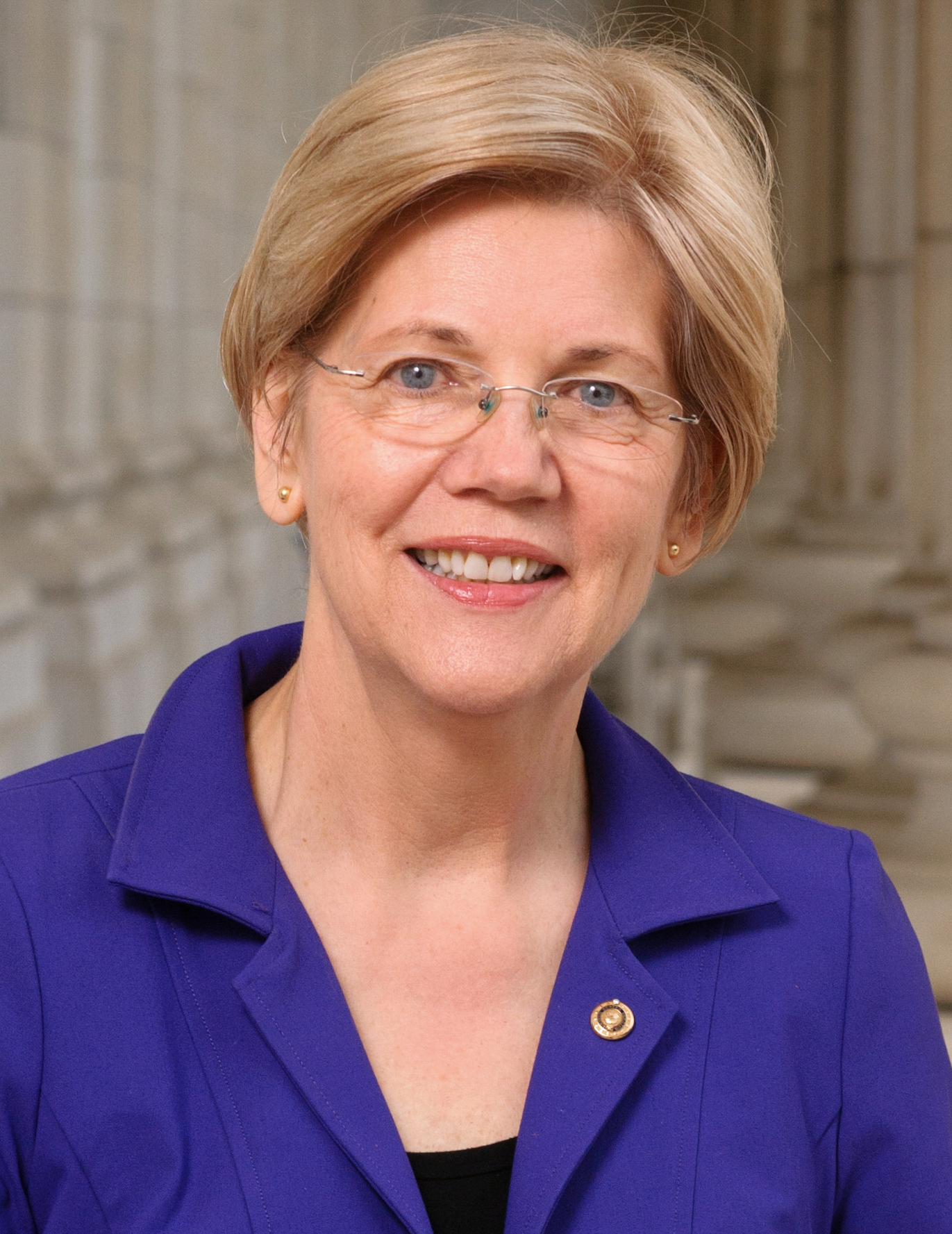

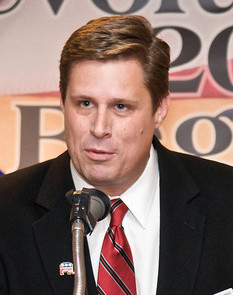
Nominee	Elizabeth Warren	Geoff Diehl
Party	Democratic	Republican
Popular vote	1,633,371	979,210
Percentage	60.34%	36.17%
- Warren: 40–50% 50–60% 60–70% 70–80% 80–90% >90% Diehl: 40–50% 50–60% 60–70% Tie: 40–50%
U.S. senator before election
Elizabeth Warren
Democratic
Elected U.S. Senator
Elizabeth Warren
Democratic

The 2018 United States Senate election in Massachusetts took place on November 6, 2018. Incumbent Democratic U.S. Senator Elizabeth Warren ran for re-election to a second term. The candidate filing deadline was June 5, 2018, and the primary election was held on September 4, 2018.

Warren won re-election, defeating her Republican opponent, state Representative Geoff Diehl.

== Democratic primary ==
=== Candidates ===
==== Nominated ====
- Elizabeth Warren, incumbent U.S. senator

=== Results ===
United States Senate Democratic primary in Massachusetts results by county, 2018: Warren—≥90%

Democratic primary results
Party	Candidate	Votes	%
Democratic	Elizabeth Warren (incumbent)	590,835	98.08%
Write-in		11,558	1.92%
Total votes		602,393	100.00%

== Republican primary ==
=== Candidates ===
==== Nominated ====
- Geoff Diehl, state representative

==== Eliminated in primary ====
- John Kingston, attorney and founder and president of Better for America
- Beth Lindstrom, former undersecretary of the Massachusetts Office of Consumer Affairs and Business Regulation

==== Eliminated at convention ====
- Darius Mitchell
- Heidi Wellman

==== Declined ====
- Gabriel Gomez, businessman, former Navy SEAL and nominee for the U.S. Senate in 2013
- Rick Green, businessman (running for House of Representatives)
- Curt Schilling, former Major League Baseball pitcher
- Bill Weld, former governor, nominee for the U.S. Senate in 1996 and Libertarian nominee for Vice President of the United States in 2016 (endorsed Beth Lindstrom)
- Daniel Winslow, former state representative and candidate for the U.S. Senate in 2013

=== Endorsements ===
Beth Lindstrom

Governors

- William F. Weld, former governor of Massachusetts, 1991-1997

State legislators

- Jay Barrows, state representative
- Kimberly Ferguson, state representative
- Paul Frost, state representative
- Sheila Harrington, state representative
- Bradford Hill, state representative
- Steven Howitt, state representative
- James Kelcourse, state representative
- David Muradian, state representative
- Elizabeth Poirier, state representative
- Richard J. Ross, state senator
- David Vieira, state representative
- Donald Wong, state representative

Local officials

- Mark Hawke, Gardner mayor
- Anne Manning-Martin, Peabody city councilor at-large

Organizations

- Maggie's List
- New England Police Benevolent Association
- RightNOW Women PAC
- Value in Electing Women (VIEW) PAC

Newspapers

- The Boston Globe
- The Lowell Sun
John Kingston

State legislators

- Donnie Berthiaume, state representative
- Will Crocker, state representative
- Vinny deMacedo, state senator
- Ryan Fattman, state senator
- Don Humason, state senator
- Joseph D. McKenna, state representative

Local officials

- Lew Evangelidis, Worcester County sheriff
- Stephanie K. Fattman, Worcester County register of probate
- Jim Kane, member of the Shrewsbury Board of Selectmen
- Eddie Tedesco, Woburn city councilor

Individuals

- Jim Rappaport, former chairman of the Massachusetts GOP

=== Polling ===
Poll source	Date(s) administered	Sample size	Margin of error	Geoff Diehl	John Kingston	Beth Lindstrom	Other	Undecided
MassINC	June 22–25, 2018	399	± 4.9%	26%	12%	15%	5%	41%

=== Results ===
==== Overall ====
Massachusetts United States Senate Republican primary results by municipality, 2018

Republican primary results
Party	Candidate	Votes	%
Republican	Geoff Diehl	144,043	55.15%
Republican	John Kingston	69,636	26.66%
Republican	Beth Lindstrom	46,693	17.88%
Write-in		798	0.31%
Total votes		261,170	100.00%

==== By county ====
Massachusetts United States Senate Republican primary results by county, 2018: Diehl—70–80% Diehl—60–70% Diehl—50–60% Diehl—40–50% Kingston—40–50%

Results by county. Red represents counties won by Diehl. Teal represents counties won by Kingston.

County	Diehl %	Diehl votes	Kingston %	Kingston votes	Lindstrom %	Lindstrom votes
Barnstable	57.0%	10,761	24.2%	4,573	18.6%	3,513
Berkshire	47.9%	1,221	37.8%	965	13.8%	352
Bristol	61.8%	11,005	23.0%	4,095	15.0%	2,669
Dukes	55.2%	347	25.9%	163	18.9%	119
Essex	53.1%	17,716	28.3%	9,428	18.3%	6,104
Franklin	41.8%	938	42.3%	949	15.3%	343
Hampden	50.5%	7,491	34.0%	5,048	15.0%	2,225
Hampshire	45.7%	1,967	36.7%	1,579	16.9%	725
Middlesex	52.5%	29,084	26.8%	14,852	20.3%	11,218
Nantucket	50.1%	168	29.6%	99	20.3%	68
Norfolk	58.9%	18,749	22.0%	7,009	18.8%	5,992
Plymouth	70.1%	23,242	19.8%	6,549	10.0%	3,316
Suffolk	53.5%	4,792	27.6%	2,471	18.2%	1,628
Worcester	44.8%	16,562	32.1%	11,856	22.8%	8,421
Total	55.2%	144,043	26.7%	69,636	17.9%	46,693

== Libertarian primary ==
=== Candidates ===
==== Declined ====
- Bill Weld, former Republican governor and nominee for vice president of the United States in 2016

== Independents ==
=== Candidates ===
==== Declared ====
- Shiva Ayyadurai, entrepreneur and conspiracy theorist
- John Devine
- Allen Waters

==== Declined ====
- Gabriel Gomez, businessman, former Navy SEAL and Republican nominee for the U.S. Senate in 2013

== General election ==
=== Endorsements ===
Elizabeth Warren (D)

State officials

- Eric Schneiderman, former attorney general of New York

Newspapers

- Boston Globe

Organizations

- Council for a Livable World
- Democracy for America
- EMILY's List
- End Citizens United
- Feminist Majority Political Action Committee
- J Street
- League of Conservation Voters
- LegitAction
- MoveOn.org
- Natural Resources Defense Council Action Fund
- Population Connection
- Sierra Club
- United Automobile Workers
Geoff Diehl (R)

U.S. executive branch officials

- Mike Pence, 48th vice president of the United States
- Sean Spicer, former White House Press Secretary

Governors

- Charlie Baker, Massachusetts
- Paul LePage, Maine

State legislators

- Nick Boldyga, state representative
- Forrester Clark, former state representative
- Leah Cole, former state representative
- Robert Correia, former state representative (Democrat)
- David DeCoste, state representative
- Peter Durant, state representative
- Marc Lombardo, state representative
- Jim Lyons, state representative
- Lenny Mirra, state representative
- Shaunna O'Connell, state representative

Local officials

- Caroline Colarusso, Stoneham selectwoman
- John Coutinho, Hopkinton selectman
- Jim Cummings, Barnstable County sheriff
- Lewis Evangelidis, Worcester County sheriff
- Bob Hedlund, Weymouth mayor
- Tom Hodgson, Bristol County sheriff
- Michael Marchese, Everett city councilor at-large
- John McCaul, Taunton city councilor
- Joe McDonald, Plymouth County sheriff
- Monica Medeiros, Melrose alderman
- Ken Mitchel, Hanson Board of Selectman chair
- Jeff Postell, Taunton city councilor
- Claire Wright, Hopkinton selectwoman

Individuals

- Herman Cain, former presidential candidate
- Howie Carr, radio talk host
- David Constantine, former governor's councilor
- Larry Ellison, president of the Massachusetts Association of Minority Law Enforcement Officers
- Steve Grogan, retired New England Patriots player
- Jeff Kuhner, hadio host
- Matt Light, retired New England Patriots player
- Joe Malone, former state treasurer
- Dave Marciano, boat captain on Wicked Tuna
- Frank McNamara, former U.S. attorney
- Stephen Moore, writer and economist
- Fred Smerlas, retired New England Patriots player

Organizations

- Association of County Employees (the Union of Plymouth County Corrections Officers)
- The Association of Marshfield Police
- Boston Police Patrolmen’s Association
- Everett Police Patrolman's Local 94
- Everett Police Superior Officers Local 95
- ICE Council Local 207
- Massachusetts Police Association
- Massachusetts Republican Party (MassGOP), Massachusetts branch of the United States Republican Party
- New Bedford Police Union
- New England Police Benevolent Association
- Norfolk Sheriff's Office County Correctional Officers Association
- NRA Political Victory Fund
- Worcester's NEPBA Local 911
- Youth Conservatives of Massachusetts

Newspapers

- Boston Herald
Shiva Ayyadurai (I)

Individuals

- Ben Garrison, political cartoonist and artist
- Curt Schilling, former MLB pitcher
- Owen Shroyer, political activist and commentator, host on InfoWars

Newspapers

- The Lowell Sun

=== Debates ===
- Complete video of debate, October 19, 2018
- Complete video of debate, October 21, 2018

=== Predictions ===
Source	Ranking	As of
The Cook Political Report	Safe D	September 28, 2018
Inside Elections	Safe D	September 29, 2017
Sabato's Crystal Ball	Safe D	September 27, 2017
Fox News	Likely D	July 9, 2018
CNN	Safe D	July 12, 2018
RealClearPolitics	Safe D	May 26, 2018

^Highest rating they assert

=== Polling ===
Poll source	Date(s) administered	Sample size	Margin of error	Elizabeth Warren (D)	Geoff Diehl (R)	Shiva Ayyadurai (I)	Other	Undecided
MassINC	October 25–28, 2018	502	± 4.4%	54%	32%	6%	3%	3%
Suffolk University	October 24–28, 2018	500	± 4.4%	56%	34%	4%	–	5%
Western New England University	October 10–27, 2018	402 LV	± 5.0%	57%	27%	7%	–	8%
Western New England University	October 10–27, 2018	485 RV	± 4.0%	54%	27%	6%	–	12%
UMass Lowell	October 1–7, 2018	485 LV	± 5.6%	56%	31%	8%	3%	2%
UMass Lowell	October 1–7, 2018	791 RV	± 4.4%	56%	28%	9%	4%	1%
MassINC	September 17–21, 2018	506	± 4.4%	56%	30%	5%	1%	6%
Suffolk University	September 13–17, 2018	500	± 4.4%	54%	24%	6%	–	16%
Suffolk University	June 8–12, 2018	500	± 4.4%	55%	33%	–	–	11%
MassINC	May 22–26, 2018	501	± 4.4%	54%	19%	8%	1%	15%
MassINC	March 16–18, 2018	504	± 4.4%	55%	20%	9%	1%	13%
MassINC	November 9–12, 2017	503	± 4.4%	58%	32%	–	3%	7%
MassINC	June 19–22, 2017	504	± 4.4%	60%	29%	–	1%	8%

Hypothetical polling

with Beth Lindstrom

Poll source	Date(s) administered	Sample size	Margin of error	Elizabeth Warren (D)	Beth Lindstrom (R)	Shiva Ayyadurai (I)	Other	Undecided
Suffolk University	June 8–12, 2018	500	± 4.4%	56%	31%	–	–	13%
MassINC	May 22–26, 2018	501	± 4.4%	55%	19%	7%	2%	15%
MassINC	March 16–18, 2018	504	± 4.4%	53%	19%	9%	1%	14%
MassINC	November 9–12, 2017	504	± 4.4%	56%	33%	–	3%	8%

with John Kingston

Poll source	Date(s) administered	Sample size	Margin of error	Elizabeth Warren (D)	John Kingston (R)	Shiva Ayyadurai (I)	Other	Undecided
Suffolk University	June 8–12, 2018	500	± 4.4%	54%	30%	–	–	15%
MassINC	May 22–26, 2018	501	± 4.4%	56%	19%	8%	1%	14%
MassINC	March 16–18, 2018	504	± 4.4%	53%	19%	7%	2%	12%
MassINC	November 9–12, 2017	504	± 4.4%	57%	33%	–	2%	7%

Poll source	Date(s) administered	Sample size	Margin of error	Elizabeth Warren (D)	Karyn Polito (R)	Mitt Romney (R)	Richard Tisei (R)	Other	Undecided
UMass Amherst	September 15–20, 2016	≈450	± 4.1%	40%	36%	–	–	5%	19%
UMass Amherst	September 15–20, 2016	≈450	± 4.1%	44%	–	31%	–	10%	15%
UMass Amherst	September 15–20, 2016	≈450	± 4.1%	39%	–	–	32%	3%	26%

with Shiva Ayyadurai running as Republican

Poll source	Date(s) administered	Sample size	Margin of error	Elizabeth Warren (D)	Shiva Ayyadurai (R)	Other	Undecided
MassINC	November 9–12, 2017	504	± 4.4%	58%	27%	4%	10%
MassINC	June 19–22, 2017	504	± 4.4%	61%	25%	2%	9%

with Curt Schilling

Poll source	Date(s) administered	Sample size	Margin of error	Elizabeth Warren (D)	Curt Schilling (R)	Other	Undecided
Suffolk University	October 24–26, 2016	500	± 4.4%	58%	24%	2%	16%
UMass Amherst	September 15–20, 2016	≈450	± 4.1%	47%	28%	9%	16%
MassINC	September 7–10, 2016	506	± 4.4%	54%	29%	3%	15%

with William Weld

Poll source	Date(s) administered	Sample size	Margin of error	Elizabeth Warren (D)	William Weld (L)	Other	Undecided
UMass Amherst	September 15–20, 2016	≈450	± 4.1%	40%	37%	8%	16%

=== Results ===
United States Senate election in Massachusetts, 2018
Party	Candidate	Votes	%	±%
Democratic	Elizabeth Warren (incumbent)	1,633,371	60.34%	+6.60%
Republican	Geoff Diehl	979,210	36.17%	−10.02%
Independent	Shiva Ayyadurai	91,710	3.39%	N/A
Write-in		2,799	0.10%	N/A
Total votes		2,707,090	100.00%	N/A
Democratic hold				

==== By county ====
By county

County	Elizabeth Warren Democratic		Geoff Diehl Republican		All others	
County	#	%	#	%	#	%
Barnstable	62,670	53.1	51,810	43.9	3,628	3.1
Berkshire	38,792	72.1	13,501	25.1	1,543	2.9
Bristol	98,921	52.2	83,919	44.3	6,673	3.5
Dukes	7,414	73.2	2,338	23.1	381	3.8
Essex	178,343	57.3	121,067	38.9	11,767	3.8
Franklin	22,912	69.5	8,790	26.7	1,265	3.8
Hampden	86,861	55.7	63,152	40.5	5,886	3.8
Hampshire	49,943	70.6	18,217	25.8	2,571	3.6
Middlesex	440,901	66.2	202,871	30.4	22,642	3.4
Nantucket	2,233	61.7	1,386	38.3	165	3.1
Norfolk	179,853	58.6	117,202	38.2	9,624	3.1
Plymouth	107,595	48.0	109,995	49.1	6,490	2.9
Suffolk	196,623	78.8	46,502	18.6	6,325	2.5
Worcester	159,881	51.4	138,495	44.5	12,772	4.1
Totals	1,634,213	60.4	979,507	36.2	91,732	3.4

Counties that flipped from Republican to Democratic

- Barnstable (largest municipality: Barnstable)
- Essex (largest municipality: Lynn)
- Norfolk (largest municipality: Quincy)
- Worcester (largest municipality: Worcester)

==== By congressional district ====
Warren won all of the state’s congressional districts.

District	Warren	Diehl	Representative
1st	59%	37%	Richard Neal
2nd	57%	39%	Jim McGovern
3rd	57%	39%	Niki Tsongas (115th Congress)
3rd	57%	39%	Lori Trahan (116th Congress)
4th	58%	38%	Joe Kennedy III
5th	69%	28%	Katherine Clark
6th	55%	41%	Seth Moulton
7th	84%	13%	Michael Capuano (115th Congress)
7th	84%	13%	Ayanna Pressley (116th Congress)
8th	58%	39%	Stephen Lynch
9th	51%	46%	Bill Keating
