= Overcharge =

Economic concept

Overcharge is an economic term that refers to the difference between an observed market price and a price that would have been observed in the absence of collusion. The latter is often called a "but-for price" or a competitive "benchmark price". When collusion is not in use, such as by privately owned businesses, overcharge is considered as a markup of the observed market price for the sole profit of the business and in some states is considered illegal, similar to profiteering and price gouging.

An overcharge may be expressed as a mark-up on the benchmark price, or it may be divided by the observed market price. When the benchmark price is equal to the marginal cost of production, as it is in perfect competition, then ratio of the overcharge to market price is the Lerner index of market power.

When the overcharge is multiplied by the quantity purchased, it becomes the monetary injury or damages incurred by a buyer of goods sold by a cartel.

The word is also used (as verb and noun) to describe cases where more than an agreed or standard price is charged for goods or services in a transaction, as when a lawyer bills for more hours than actually worked, a restaurant bill includes items not ordered or is added incorrectly, a builder charges an unreasonable amount for repair work, and so on. Overcharging in this sense may in some cases be a criminal offence (charging for work not done), in others not (a high charge when a price was not agreed).

The term is used in a different sense in US legal circles; overcharging in this context is a practice whereby the District Attorney's office in a county initially makes criminal charges against a suspect that exceed what is actually justified by the facts to establish a strong plea bargaining position, with the intention of persuading the suspect to plead guilty to a lesser offence to avoid the perceived risk of being convicted of a more serious crime than was actually committed, with more severe penalty.
