= El Planeta =

Boston-based Spanish language newspaper

- Boston's Latino Daily
- Owner(s): MasTV - El Planeta, LLC
- Founder: Javier Marin
- Founded: May 2005
- Language: Spanish
- Headquarters: 399 Boylston Street, 6th Floor, Boston, MA
- Website: elplaneta.com

El Planeta is a Boston-based Spanish language newspaper serving the Hispanic community of New England.

== Company history ==
Founded by Javier Marin in 2004 in Brookline as Hispanic News Press (HNP), the company launched El Planeta in May 2005 with 5,000 copies in circulation. In September 2005, four editions of the newspaper targeted four different areas in Massachusetts: (Greater Boston, Lawrence, Worcester and Providence). In September 2005, Phoenix Media/Communications Group (PMCG) noticing the growth in the Hispanic market and, seeing this as great opportunity to enter in a different market, acquired a 35% stake of El Planeta, becoming the major stakeholder of the company. In January 2009 El Planeta was finally fully integrated in PMCG and spun-off HNP. Between 2009 and 2012 the newspaper positioned itself as a leading outlet in the Hispanic community increasing its circulation to 50,000 copies. They also maintained and grew events such as "Health and Family", "Powermeter 100", "Best of Boston" and "Latin Taste of Boston".

In late 2011, Javier Marin decided to invest in a new media outlet. He approached WCEA / Cuencavisión, a TV station founded in 1982 by Peter Cuenca, a Cuban immigrant to Boston. Marin took ownership and management of the station in order to transform its business model. A year later in 2012, he and two other partners built a state of the art new studio in Somerville, MA and rebranded the TV station as MásTV. In early 2012, Marin decided to re-acquire El Planeta, as he saw the opportunity to re-integrate it into a media strategy for the local growing market. By May 2012 the re-acquisition transaction was consolidated and El Planeta, TuBoston.com and Health and Family Magazine joined MásTV and a new integrated media company was formed, MÁS MEDIA.

As of 2011, El Planeta was "the leading publication in the New England Hispanic market".

== Distribution ==
With a total weekly average circulation reaching out to over a 120,000 weekly readers, El Planeta is the largest circulating Spanish language newspaper across the Greater Boston Metropolitan area, including Lowell, and Lawrence in the Merrimack Valley of Massachusetts. Its circulation is monitored weekly, with a 95% average pickup rate. Its mission is oriented to inform, educate, and unite the Hispanic community with others.

== Community events ==
- Powermeter 100 highlights the 100 most influential people for the Hispanic community.
- Salud y Familia Event is a free annual celebration of Hispanic heritage since 2006. It takes place at the Reggie Lewis Athletic Center at Roxbury Community College.
- Latin Taste of Boston, a major, local Hispanic food festival in Boston.
- Best of El Planeta: Every year El Planeta Newspaper asks its readers to vote for their favorite restaurants, cocktails, hair salons, retailers, neighborhood stores, local personalities and more in a total of 60+ different categories. At the event El Planeta presents all the winners for each category.
