= Denise Andrews =

American politician (born 1959)

Member of the Massachusetts House of Representatives from the 2nd Franklin district
- In office January 5, 2011 – January 7, 2015
- Preceded by: Christopher Donelan
- Succeeded by: Susannah Whipps

Personal details
- Born: July 14, 1959 (age 67) Orange, Massachusetts
- Party: Democratic
- Education: UMass Amherst; Xavier University
- Website: deniseandrews.org

Denise Andrews (born July 14, 1959) is an American politician from Western Massachusetts. A Democrat, she was a member of the Massachusetts House of Representatives representing the 2nd Franklin district from 2011 to 2015. The 2nd Franklin district comprises twelve communities, Athol, Belchertown precinct A, Erving, Gill, New Salem, Orange, Petersham, Phillipston, Royalston, Templeton, Warwick, and Wendell.

Andrews, was born in Orange and lives there with her wife Candi Fetzer. Andrews earned a bachelor's degree in chemical engineering from UMass Amherst and an MBA in international business from Xavier University before embarking on a 25-year career with Procter & Gamble (P&G). Her first P&G positions were in Quincy, Massachusetts, and she later moved to the company's headquarters in Cincinnati, Ohio. She left P&G in 2006 after four years as the company's global diversity & inclusion manager. She then established her own consulting business, Legacy Unlimited.

Following incumbent state representative Chris Donelan's announcement that he would run for Franklin County sheriff rather than seek re-election in 2010, Andrews launched a bid to succeed him in the state house. In the Democratic primary election held on September 14, 2010, Andrews polled 37% in a five candidate race, finishing 519 votes ahead of the second-place finisher, who took 24%. In the general election held on November 2, she polled 6,885 (53%), finishing over 1,300 votes ahead of the Republican nominee (who took 42%) and an independent (on 5%). She first took office on January 5, 2011. She was defeated for re-election by Republican Susannah Whipps Lee in November 2014; her term ended January 7, 2015.
