= Michael Sullivan (U.S. attorney) =

American lawyer and politician

Michael J. Sullivan
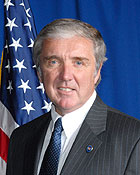

Acting Director of the Bureau of Alcohol, Tobacco, Firearms and Explosives
- In office September 2006 – January 20, 2009
- Appointed by: Alberto Gonzales
- President: George W. Bush
- Preceded by: Carl Truscott; Edgar A. Domenech (acting)
- Succeeded by: Ronald "Ronnie" A. Carter (acting); Kenneth E. Melson (acting)

United States Attorney for the District of Massachusetts
- In office September 19, 2001 – April 17, 2009
- President: George W. Bush; Barack Obama
- Preceded by: Donald Stern
- Succeeded by: Carmen Ortiz

District Attorney of Plymouth County
- In office June 1995 – September 2001
- Preceded by: William O'Malley
- Succeeded by: Timothy Cruz

Member of the Massachusetts House of Representatives from the 7th Plymouth district
- In office January 1991 – June 1995
- Preceded by: Emmet Hayes
- Succeeded by: Ronald Whitney

Personal details
- Born: October 3, 1954 (age 72) Boston, Massachusetts, U.S.
- Party: Republican
- Education: Boston College; Suffolk University

Michael J. Sullivan (born October 3, 1954) is an American lawyer and politician who served as U.S. Attorney for the District of Massachusetts (2001–2009) and Acting Director of the Bureau of Alcohol, Tobacco, Firearms and Explosives (ATF) (2006–2009). His work as U.S. Attorney largely focused on national security and health-care fraud. A native of the Holbrook–Abington region, Sullivan served earlier in his career as the Plymouth County District Attorney, and as a Republican member of the Massachusetts House of Representatives.

== Early life and career ==
Sullivan was born October 3, 1954, the second of seven children, and grew up in Holbrook, Massachusetts. He attended Boston College High School and Boston College, and went onto Suffolk University Law School. He worked with the Gillette Company from 1973 to 1989 before moving into private law, becoming partner at McGovern & Sullivan in the early 1990s.

Representing the town of Abington, he was elected as a Republican state representative in 1990. He was voted "Legislator of the Year" by the Massachusetts Municipal Organization in 1994. Among his initiatives was a budget amendment to have the Massachusetts Water Resources Authority charge municipalities for sewage management by volume instead of population, which moved much of the cost burden away from outlying towns and toward Boston. The amendment was adopted by the House but reversed the following day under pressure from Democratic leaders. He stepped down in 1995 after being named District Attorney for Plymouth County. He took early steps to run for the U.S. Senate against incumbent Ted Kennedy in 2000, but retracted before declaring an official candidacy.

== Tenure as U.S. Attorney ==
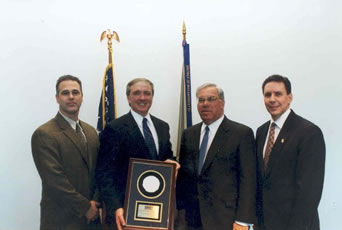
Sullivan (second from left) is recognized by the U.S. Drug Enforcement Administration in 2003 as part of the Boston Gun Violence Reduction Program.

Sullivan was appointed U.S. Attorney for the District of Massachusetts by President George W. Bush on September 14, 2001, in the wake of the September 11 attacks. His early work revolved around the terrorist attacks, which were launched from Boston's Logan Airport. Sullivan was the prosecutor in the 2001–2002 criminal trial of Richard Reid, widely known as the "Shoe Bomber".

He prosecuted airport workers arrested at Logan Airport as part of "Operation Tarmac" accused of lying about their nationality on job applications. According to the Boston Phoenix, "every US attorney prosecuting Operation Tarmac cases [...] either reduced or dropped the charges" except for Sullivan, who wrote, "Ignoring the alleged criminal activity of illegal immigrants sends the wrong message to the rest of the world."

Within a few weeks of taking office, Sullivan organized a health-care fraud unit in his district and nearly tripled the number of prosecutors assigned to medical cases, prosecuting companies such as TAP Pharmaceuticals as well as smaller facilities and individual providers. He said: "You couldn't ignore this, even in light of 9/11."

He spoke before the U.S. House Judiciary Subcommittee on Crime, Terrorism, and Homeland Security in support of the USA PATRIOT Act in May 2005, urging Congress to make the act's surveillance provisions permanent.

Sullivan presented charges, in Boston, on November 23, 2005, against Abdullah Khadr, an Egyptian from Canada who is alleged to have sold arms to the Taliban.

In February 2009, following the inauguration of President Barack Obama, Sullivan announced his intention to resign his position, following the customary practice of U.S. Attorneys, who typically do not retain their posts in a new administrations.

== Tenure as ATF Director ==
In 2006, Sullivan was made Acting Director of ATF by President George W. Bush. The position had been made subject to the Senate confirmation process and Sullivan was the first nominee to be sent to the Senate. Bush nominated Sullivan to be permanent director in 2007, but the nomination was blocked by a Senate hold placed by Senators David Vitter (R-Louisiana), Michael Crapo (R-Idaho) and Larry E. Craig (R-Idaho). They expressed their concern that ATF is hostile to small gun dealers, pursuing them overzealously for small paperwork infractions and driving law-abiding small retailers out of business. They said that Sullivan was indifferent to their concerns and "exhibits a lack of willingness to address these problems."

Sullivan has been criticized frequently by one such affected gun dealer, Ryan Horsley of Red’s Trading Post, Twin Falls, Idaho, Idaho's oldest gun dealership. Horsley says that ATF has a long track record of abusive behavior and Sullivan, as Acting Director, continued to defend ATF's abusive actions without any indication of making changes.

Sullivan was a keynote speaker and special guest at the 2007 Great Lakes Summit on Gun Violence conference. This conference was organized by the International Association of Chiefs of Police and funded by a $375,000 grant from the Joyce Foundation. The report of the conference was titled "Taking a Stand: Reducing Gun Violence in Our Communities" and called for the passage of several gun bans and gun control measures. The National Rifle Association of America has criticized the IACP report, calling it "a rubber stamp, bought and paid for, of the pre-existing agenda for gun ban groups." The report was produced with assistance from the Joyce Foundation's Communications Director and with contributions from gun control advocates such as Kristen Rand and Tom Diaz of the Violence Policy Center. The NRA has called the Joyce Foundation an activist foundation whose "shadowy web of huge donations" leads "straight to puppet strings that control the agenda of gun ban groups".

Sullivan's confirmation was opposed by gun rights groups such as the Gun Owners of America, Citizens Committee for the Right to Keep and Bear Arms and Jews for the Preservation of Firearms Ownership. The NRA did not categorically state its opposition to the confirmation of Mr. Sullivan but expressed its concern over ATF's "overly restrictive legal interpretations" and "overly zealous enforcement activities".

Sullivan resigned as Acting Director effective January 20, 2009 to make way for incoming President Barack Obama to name his own nominee.

== U.S. Senate election, 2013 ==
Sullivan announced on February 14, that he would collect signatures to run for the Republican nomination in the 2013 special election to succeed John Kerry as U.S. Senator. He relied on volunteers rather than paid organizations to gather signatures. On February 27, he announced that he had gathered the requisite 10,000 signatures to appear on the primary ballot. He faced state Representative Dan Winslow and former U.S. Navy SEAL Gabriel Gomez in the April 30 primary. Sullivan was defeated in the primary by Gabriel E. Gomez who garnered 93,632, or 51% of the votes. Sullivan, gathered 66,164 votes, or 36%, whereas state Representative Dan Winslow, collected 24,057, or 13% of the votes, with 99 percent of precincts reporting shortly before 11:30 pm, on April 30, 2013. Sullivan later endorsed Gomez.

== Personal life ==
Sullivan's residence is in Abington. He and his wife Terry have four children. He has been partner at The Ashcroft Group since 2009. His daughter Alyson Sullivan represents the 7th Plymouth District in the Massachusetts House of Representatives. Sullivan is the Chairman of the Board of HarborOne Bank the largest state-chartered co-operative bank in New England.
