= Ronald Whitney (politician) =

American politician

Member of the Massachusetts House of Representatives from the 7th Plymouth district
- In office 1995–1997
- Preceded by: Michael Sullivan
- Succeeded by: Kathleen Teahan

Personal details
- Party: Republican

Ronald Whitney is an American politician who served in the Massachusetts House of Representatives from 1995 to 1997. He was elected to the House in 1995 in a special election to succeed Michael Sullivan, who was appointed Plymouth County District Attorney. He was defeated in his bid for a full term by Kathleen Teahan.
