= Overcharging (law) =

Overcharging, in law, refers to a prosecutorial practice that involves "tacking on" additional charges that the prosecutor knows cannot be proven. It is used to put the prosecutor in a better plea bargaining position. The term has been defined in different ways. Alschuler writes that "to prosecutors, overcharging is accusing the defendant of a crime of which he is clearly innocent to induce a plea to the 'proper' crime. Defense counsel identify two types of overcharging. 'Horizontal' overcharging is the unreasonable multiplying of accusations against a single defendant. He may be either charged with a separate offense for every technical criminal transaction in which he participated, or the prosecutor may fragment a single criminal transaction into numerous component offenses. 'Vertical' overcharging is charging a single offense at a higher level than the circumstances of the case seem to warrant." Vertical overcharging is deemed to be the more abusive of the two practices. In defense of overcharging, it has been argued that in order to obtain a plea bargain that results in a lower sentence than the prosecutor's original position, while still obtaining a penalty that promotes public safety, the prosecutor must select an initial charge higher than is penologically appropriate.

Although theoretically overcharging is impermissible, courts are reluctant to dismiss charges that are supported by probable cause. American Bar Association guidelines discourage overcharging, but do not prohibit it. It has been said that rules aimed at combating prosecutorial vindictiveness that force prosecutors to justify any distinct indictments brought subsequent to an initial charge raise the possibility of overcharging. It has been argued that restrictions on the current practice of plea bargaining would most likely result in a reduction in overcharging by the prosecutor.
