= 2022 Massachusetts State Auditor election =

- November 8, 2022
- Turnout: 51.4% ▼8.75%
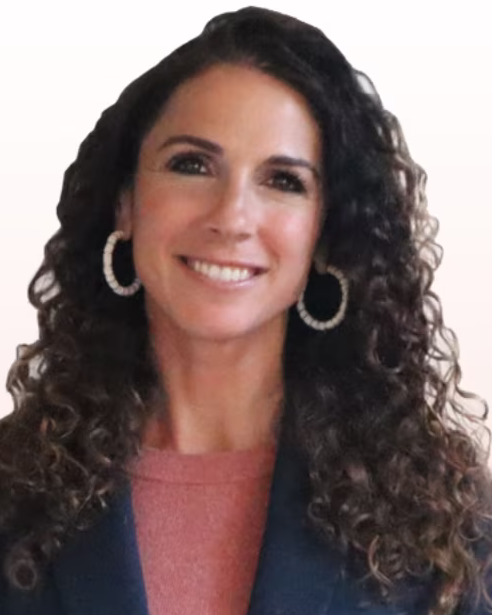

Nominee	Diana DiZoglio	Anthony Amore
Party	Democratic	Republican
Popular vote	1,310,773	897,223
Percentage	55.1%	37.7%
- DiZoglio: 40–50% 50–60% 60–70% 70–80% 80–90% Amore: 40–50% 50–60% 60–70%
State Auditor before election
Suzanne Bump
Democratic
Elected State Auditor
Diana DiZoglio
Democratic

The 2022 Massachusetts state auditor election was held on November 8, 2022 to elect the Massachusetts state auditor. The election was held alongside other elections in Massachusetts. Incumbent Auditor Suzanne Bump did not run for re-election. Democratic nominee Diana DiZoglio defeated Republican nominee Anthony Amore in the general election.

Primary elections were held on September 6, 2022. Diana DiZoglio defeated Chris Dempsey in the Democratic primary, while Anthony Amore won the Republican primary unopposed. In addition to the major party primaries, minor parties also nominated candidates. The Green-Rainbow Party nominated Gloria Cabellero-Roca, the Workers Party of Massachusetts nominated Dominic Giannone, and the Libertarian Party nominated Daniel Riek.

== Background ==
The Massachusetts state auditor is tasked with conducting investigations and audits of government agencies. The auditor has the authority and responsibility to audit all government agencies and departments within Massachusetts. Most agencies and departments are required to undergo audits every three years. The auditor is expected to follow standards set by the comptroller general of the United States.

Incumbent three-term State Auditor Suzanne Bump, a Democrat, was eligible to run for re-election. However, on May 25, 2021, she announced that she would not run for a fourth term.

== Democratic primary ==
=== Candidates ===
==== Nominee ====
- Diana DiZoglio, state senator (2013–2023)

==== Eliminated in primary ====
- Chris Dempsey, leader of Transportation for Massachusetts, a non-profit transportation advocacy group

==== Withdrawn ====
- Eileen Duff, governor's councillor (2013–2025) (endorsed DiZoglio)

==== Declined ====
- Suzanne Bump, incumbent state auditor (2011–2023) (endorsed Dempsey)

=== Endorsements ===
Eileen Duff (withdrawn)

State officials

- Mary Hurley, member of the Governor's Council

State legislators

- Tram Nguyen, state representative
- Tom Walsh, state representative
Diana DiZoglio

U.S. representatives

- Lori Trahan, MA-03 (2019–present)

State officials

- Eileen Duff, member of the Governor's Council

State legislators

- John Cronin, state senator
- Lydia Edwards, state senator
- Barry Finegold, state senator
- Anne Gobi, state senator
- Edward J. Kennedy, state senator
- Michael O. Moore, state senator

Labor unions

- Boston Carmen's Union Local 589
- Massachusetts AFL-CIO
- Massachusetts Nurses Association
- Massachusetts Teachers Association
- National Association of Government Employees

Organizations

- EMILY's List
Chris Dempsey

State officials

- Suzanne Bump, incumbent state auditor (2011–2023)

State legislators

- Natalie Blais, state representative
- Jo Comerford, state senator
- Carmine Gentile, state representative
- Kathleen O'Connor Ives, former state senator (predecessor to DiZoglio)
- Jack Patrick Lewis, state representative
- Jeffrey Roy, state representative
- Karen Spilka, president of the Massachusetts Senate (2018–present)
- Joe Wagner, state representative
- Bud Williams, state representative

Local officials

- Michelle Wu, mayor of Boston (2021–present)

Organizations

- 350 Mass Action
- Bay State Stonewall Democrats
- Our Revolution Massachusetts
- Progressive Democrats of Massachusetts
- Sierra Club

Political parties

- Massachusetts Democratic Party

=== Debates ===
Three debates were held for the Democratic primary.

2022 Massachusetts gubernatorial general election debates
No.	Date	Host	Moderators	Link	Democratic	Democratic
Key: P Participant A Absent N Non-invitee I Invitee W Withdrawn						
Key: P Participant A Absent N Non-invitee I Invitee W Withdrawn					Diana DiZoglio	Chris Dempsey
1	Aug. 3, 2022	WBUR-FM; The Boston Globe; WCVB-TV	Tiziana Dearing	YouTube	P	P
2	Aug. 8, 2022	WGBH-TV	Jim Braude	YouTube	P	P
3	Aug. 12, 2022	WBZ-TV	Jon Keller	CBS	P	P

=== Results ===
==== Convention ====
Democratic convention vote
Party	Candidate	Votes	%
Democratic	Chris Dempsey	2,148	52.6%
Democratic	Diana DiZoglio	1,931	47.3%
Total votes		4,079	100.0%

==== Primary ====
Democratic primary results
Party	Candidate	Votes	%
Democratic	Diana DiZoglio	372,597	54.4%
Democratic	Christopher Dempsey	311,156	45.4%
Write-in		1,082	0.2%
Total votes		684,835	100.0%

== Republican primary ==
=== Candidates ===
==== Nominee ====
- Anthony Amore, security professional and private investigator

=== Endorsements ===
Anthony Amore

State officials

- Charlie Baker, governor of Massachusetts (2015–2023)

=== Results ===
Republican primary results
Party	Candidate	Votes	%
Republican	Anthony Amore	201,280	99.5%
Write-in		1,130	0.5%
Total votes		202,410	100.0%

== General election ==
=== Post-primary endorsements ===
Diana DiZoglio (D)

State officials

- Suzanne Bump, incumbent state auditor (2011–2023)
Anthony Amore (R)

State officials

- Maura Healey, attorney general of Massachusetts (2015–2023)
- Jane Swift, former acting governor of Massachusetts (2001–2003) and former lieutenant governor of Massachusetts (1999–2003)

=== Polling ===
Poll source	Date(s) administered	Sample size (Note: Key: A – all adults RV – registered voters LV – likely voters V – unclear)	Margin of error	Diana DiZoglio (D)	Anthony Amore (R)	Gloria Cabellero-Roca (G-R)	Dominic Giannone (W)	Daniel Riek (L)	Other	Undecided
UMass Amherst/WCVB	October 20–26, 2022	700 (RV)	± 4.3%	51%	33%	2%	3%	5%	3% (Note: "Other" with 3%)	4%
UMass Lowell	October 18–25, 2022	1000 (LV)	± 4.1%	44%	29%	4%	2%	2%	–	19%
Suffolk University/Boston Globe/NBC10 Boston/Telemundo	October 13–16, 2022	500 (LV)	± 4.4%	39.8%	25.2%	3.2%	1.2%	5.4%	1% (Note: "Refused" with 1%)	24.2%
Suffolk University/Boston Globe/NBC10 Boston/Telemundo	September 10-13, 2022	500 (LV)	± 4.4%	39.4%	21.0%	3.0%	1.8%	5.4%	1%	28.4%

=== Debate ===
Amore challenged DiZoglio to five debates held in different parts of Massachusetts. However, only one was held.

2022 Massachusetts state auditor debate
No.	Date	Host	Moderator	Link	Democratic	Republican
Key: P Participant A Absent N Not invited I Invited W Withdrawn						
Key: P Participant A Absent N Not invited I Invited W Withdrawn					Diana DiZoglio	Anthony Amore
1	Oct. 15, 2022	WBZ-TV	Jon Keller	CBS	P	P

=== Results ===
2022 Massachusetts state auditor election
Party	Candidate	Votes	%
Democratic	Diana DiZoglio	1,310,773	55.1%
Republican	Anthony Amore	897,223	37.7%
Green-Rainbow	Gloria A. Caballero-Roca	68,646	2.9%
Workers Party	Dominic S. Giannone, III	51,877	2.2%
Libertarian	Daniel Werner Riek	48,625	2.0%
Write-in		1,648	0.1%
Total votes		2,378,792	100.0%
Democratic hold			

==== By county ====
DiZoglio won all but one county.

By county

County	Diana DiZoglio Democratic		Anthony Amore Republican		All Others	
County	#	%	#	%	#	%
Barnstable	56,295	51.0%	46,487	42.1%	7,580	6.9%
Berkshire	29,362	62.2%	13,699	29.0%	1,818	8.8%
Bristol	83,547	47.6%	79,374	45.2%	12,512	7.1%
Dukes	6,061	68.3%	2,117	23.9%	698	7.9%
Essex	154,413	55.9%	107,071	38.8%	14,744	5.3%
Franklin	18,117	59.4%	8,697	28.5%	3,670	12.0%
Hampden	61,265	46.1%	58,784	44.2%	12,846	9.7%
Hampshire	37,939	60.9%	17,008	27.3%	7,398	11.7%
Middlesex	351,097	60.6%	190,525	32.9%	38,135	6.5%
Nantucket	2,679	57.6%	1,573	33.8%	402	8.6%
Norfolk	149,032	55.1%	102,873	38.0%	18,683	6.8%
Plymouth	95,200	46.3%	95,526	46.4%	14,931	7.2%
Suffolk	130,003	68.6%	44,394	23.4%	15,149	7.8%
Worcester	133,998	47.6%	128,058	45.4%	19,716	6.9%
Totals	1,310,773	55.1%	897,223	37.7%	170,796	7.1%

Counties that flipped from Democratic to Republican

- Plymouth (largest municipality: Brockton)

==== By congressional district ====
DiZoglio won all nine congressional districts.

District	DiZoglio	Amore	Representative
1st	49%	42%	Richard Neal
2nd	53%	39%	Jim McGovern
3rd	55%	39%	Lori Trahan
4th	53%	40%	Jake Auchincloss
5th	63%	31%	Katherine Clark
6th	53%	41%	Seth Moulton
7th	74%	17%	Ayanna Pressley
8th	55%	38%	Stephen Lynch
9th	48%	44%	Bill Keating
