= Massachusetts's 8th congressional district =

U.S. House district for Massachusetts

Coordinates: 42°11′41″N 70°56′38″W

- Interactive map of district boundaries since January 3, 2023
- Representative: Stephen Lynch; D–Boston
- Population (2025): 790,589
- Median household income: $117,197
- Ethnicity: 66.3% White; 9.6% Asian; 9.4% Black; 6.8% Hispanic; 5.8% Two or more races; 2.0% other
- Cook PVI: D+15

Massachusetts's 8th congressional district is located in eastern Massachusetts, including the southern fourth of Boston. It is represented by Democrat Stephen Lynch. For one congressional term (1791–1793), it served as the home district of the District of Maine. The district boundaries were significantly changed, as of the elections of 2012, due to redistricting after the 2010 census, with the old 8th district largely being shifted to the new 7th district. The new 8th district comprises many of the communities of the old 9th district, as well as some easternmost Norfolk County communities and northernmost Plymouth County communities of the old 10th district.

This district has the distinction of being the only one ever represented by someone who had previously served as president of the United States, as John Quincy Adams held this office after leaving the presidency from 1843 until his death in 1848.

== Recent election results from statewide races ==
Year	Office	Results
2008	President	Obama 59% - 40%
2008	Senate	Kerry 67% - 33%
2010	Senate (Spec.)	Brown 55% - 45%
2010	Governor	Patrick 45% - 42%
2012	President	Obama 60% - 40%
2012	Senate	Warren 51% - 49%
2014	Senate	Markey 62% - 38%
2014	Governor	Baker 51% - 45%
2016	President	Clinton 60% - 33%
2018	Senate	Warren 59% - 38%
2018	Governor	Baker 67% - 32%
2018	Secretary of the Commonwealth	Galvin 74% - 22%
2018	Attorney General	Healey 71% - 29%
2018	Treasurer and Receiver-General	Goldberg 69% - 27%
2018	Auditor	Bump 64% - 30%
2020	President	Biden 67% - 31%
2020	Senate	Markey 67% - 33%
2022	Governor	Healey 64% - 35%
2022	Secretary of the Commonwealth	Galvin 70% - 28%
2022	Attorney General	Campbell 63% - 37%
2022	Auditor	DiZoglio 55% - 38%
2024	President	Harris 62% - 35%
2024	Senate	Warren 59% - 40%

== Cities and towns in the district ==
For the 118th and successive Congresses (based on redistricting following the 2020 census), the district contains all or portions of four counties and 21 municipalities:

Bristol County (1)

Easton

Norfolk County (12)

Avon, Braintree, Canton, Dedham, Holbrook, Milton (part; also 7th), Norwood, Quincy, Stoughton, Walpole, Westwood, Weymouth

Plymouth County (7)

Abington, Brockton, East Bridgewater, Hingham, Hull, West Bridgewater, Whitman

Suffolk County (1)

Boston (part; also 7th)

== List of members representing the district ==
Representative	Party	Years	Cong ress	Electoral history	District location
District created March 4, 1789
Jonathan Grout (Lunenburg)	Anti-Administration	March 4, 1789 – March 3, 1791	1st	Elected in 1788. Redistricted to the 7th district and lost re-election.	1789–1793; Worcester County
Vacant		March 4, 1791 – April 4, 1791	2nd		1789–1793; Worcester County
George Thatcher (Biddeford)	Pro-Administration	April 4, 1791 – March 3, 1793	2nd	Redistricted from the 6th district and re-elected late in 1791. Redistricted to the 4th district.	1789–1793; Worcester County
District inactive		March 4, 1793 – March 3, 1795	3rd		
Fisher Ames (Dedham)	Federalist	March 4, 1795 – March 3, 1797	4th	Redistricted from the 1st district and re-elected in 1794. Retired.	1795–1803 "1st Middle district"
Harrison Gray Otis (Boston)	Federalist	March 4, 1797 – March 3, 1801	5th 6th	Elected in 1796. Re-elected in 1798. Retired.	1795–1803 "1st Middle district"
William Eustis (Boston)	Democratic-Republican	March 4, 1801 – March 3, 1803	7th	Elected in 1800. Redistricted to the 1st district.	1795–1803 "1st Middle district"
Lemuel Williams (New Bedford)	Federalist	March 4, 1803 – March 3, 1805	8th	Redistricted from the 5th district and re-elected in 1802. Lost re-election.	1803–1815 "Barnstable district"
Isaiah L. Green (Barnstable)	Democratic-Republican	March 4, 1805 – March 3, 1809	9th 10th	Elected in 1804. Re-elected in 1806. Retired.	1803–1815 "Barnstable district"
Gideon Gardner (Nantucket)	Democratic-Republican	March 4, 1809 – March 3, 1811	11th	Elected in 1808. Retired.	1803–1815 "Barnstable district"
Isaiah L. Green (Barnstable)	Democratic-Republican	March 4, 1811 – March 3, 1813	12th	Elected in 1810. Lost re-election.	1803–1815 "Barnstable district"
John Reed Jr. (Yarmouth)	Federalist	March 4, 1813 – March 3, 1815	13th	Elected in 1812. Redistricted to the 9th district.	1803–1815 "Barnstable district"
William Baylies (Bridgewater)	Federalist	March 4, 1815 – March 3, 1817	14th	Redistricted from the 7th district and re-elected in 1814. Retired.	1815–1823 "Plymouth district"
Zabdiel Sampson (Plymouth)	Democratic-Republican	March 4, 1817 – July 26, 1820	15th 16th	Elected in 1817 on the second ballot. Resigned to become collector of customs in Plymouth.	1815–1823 "Plymouth district"
Vacant		July 26, 1820 – November 24, 1820	16th		1815–1823 "Plymouth district"
Aaron Hobart (Hanover)	Democratic-Republican	November 24, 1820 – March 3, 1823	16th 17th	Elected in 1820. Later elected on the second ballot to finish Sampson's term and seated December 18, 1820. Redistricted to the 11th district.	1815–1823 "Plymouth district"
Samuel Lathrop (West Springfield)	Adams-Clay Federalist	March 4, 1823 – March 3, 1825	18th 19th	Redistricted from the 5th district and re-elected in 1822. Re-elected in 1825 on the third ballot. [data missing]	1823–1833 "Hampden district"
Samuel Lathrop (West Springfield)	Anti-Jacksonian	March 4, 1825 – March 3, 1827	18th 19th	Redistricted from the 5th district and re-elected in 1822. Re-elected in 1825 on the third ballot. [data missing]	1823–1833 "Hampden district"
Isaac C. Bates (Northampton)	Anti-Jacksonian	March 4, 1827 – March 3, 1835	20th 21st 22nd 23rd	Elected in 1827 on the third ballot. Re-elected in 1828. Re-elected in 1830. Re-elected in 1833. Retired.	1823–1833 "Hampden district"
Isaac C. Bates (Northampton)	Anti-Jacksonian	March 4, 1827 – March 3, 1835	20th 21st 22nd 23rd	Elected in 1827 on the third ballot. Re-elected in 1828. Re-elected in 1830. Re-elected in 1833. Retired.	1833–1843 [data missing]
William B. Calhoun (Springfield)	Anti-Jacksonian	March 4, 1835 – March 3, 1837	24th 25th 26th 27th	Elected in 1834. Re-elected in 1836. Re-elected in 1838. Re-elected in 1840. Retired.	1833–1843 [data missing]
William B. Calhoun (Springfield)	Whig	March 4, 1837 – March 3, 1843	24th 25th 26th 27th	Elected in 1834. Re-elected in 1836. Re-elected in 1838. Re-elected in 1840. Retired.	1833–1843 [data missing]
John Quincy Adams (Quincy)	Whig	March 4, 1843 – February 23, 1848	28th 29th 30th	Redistricted from the 12th district and re-elected in 1842. Re-elected in 1844. Re-elected in 1846. Died.	1843–1853 "All the towns in Norfolk County; Abington, North Bridgewater, Hingham, and Hull, in the County of Plymouth; and Brighton, Holliston, Natick, Newton, and Sherburne, in the County of Middlesex."
Vacant		February 23, 1848 – April 2, 1848	30th		1843–1853 "All the towns in Norfolk County; Abington, North Bridgewater, Hingham, and Hull, in the County of Plymouth; and Brighton, Holliston, Natick, Newton, and Sherburne, in the County of Middlesex."
Horace Mann (West Newton)	Whig	April 3, 1848 – March 3, 1853	30th 31st 32nd	Elected to finish Adams's term. Re-elected later in 1848. Re-elected in 1850. [data missing]	1843–1853 "All the towns in Norfolk County; Abington, North Bridgewater, Hingham, and Hull, in the County of Plymouth; and Brighton, Holliston, Natick, Newton, and Sherburne, in the County of Middlesex."
Tappan Wentworth (Lowell)	Whig	March 4, 1853 – March 3, 1855	33rd	Elected in 1852. [data missing]	1853–1863 "The city of Lowell, and the towns of Acton, Ashby, Ashland, Bedford, Billerica, Boxborough, Carlisle, Chelmsford, Concord, Dracut, Dunstable, Framingham, Groton, Hopkinton, Lincoln, Littleton, Marlborough, Natick, Pepperell, Shirley, Stow, Sudbury, Tewksbury, Townsend, Tyngsborough, Wayland. Westford, and Weston, in the county of Middlesex; and the towns of Berlin, Bolton, Harvard, Lunenburg, Northborough, Southborough, and Westborough, in the county of Worcester."
Chauncey L. Knapp (Lowell)	Know Nothing	March 4, 1855 – March 3, 1857	34th 35th	Elected in 1854. Re-elected in 1856. [data missing]	1853–1863 "The city of Lowell, and the towns of Acton, Ashby, Ashland, Bedford, Billerica, Boxborough, Carlisle, Chelmsford, Concord, Dracut, Dunstable, Framingham, Groton, Hopkinton, Lincoln, Littleton, Marlborough, Natick, Pepperell, Shirley, Stow, Sudbury, Tewksbury, Townsend, Tyngsborough, Wayland. Westford, and Weston, in the county of Middlesex; and the towns of Berlin, Bolton, Harvard, Lunenburg, Northborough, Southborough, and Westborough, in the county of Worcester."
Chauncey L. Knapp (Lowell)	Republican	March 4, 1857 – March 3, 1859	34th 35th	Elected in 1854. Re-elected in 1856. [data missing]	1853–1863 "The city of Lowell, and the towns of Acton, Ashby, Ashland, Bedford, Billerica, Boxborough, Carlisle, Chelmsford, Concord, Dracut, Dunstable, Framingham, Groton, Hopkinton, Lincoln, Littleton, Marlborough, Natick, Pepperell, Shirley, Stow, Sudbury, Tewksbury, Townsend, Tyngsborough, Wayland. Westford, and Weston, in the county of Middlesex; and the towns of Berlin, Bolton, Harvard, Lunenburg, Northborough, Southborough, and Westborough, in the county of Worcester."
Charles R. Train (Framingham)	Republican	March 4, 1859 – March 3, 1863	36th 37th	Elected in 1858. Re-elected in 1860. [data missing]	1853–1863 "The city of Lowell, and the towns of Acton, Ashby, Ashland, Bedford, Billerica, Boxborough, Carlisle, Chelmsford, Concord, Dracut, Dunstable, Framingham, Groton, Hopkinton, Lincoln, Littleton, Marlborough, Natick, Pepperell, Shirley, Stow, Sudbury, Tewksbury, Townsend, Tyngsborough, Wayland. Westford, and Weston, in the county of Middlesex; and the towns of Berlin, Bolton, Harvard, Lunenburg, Northborough, Southborough, and Westborough, in the county of Worcester."
John D. Baldwin (Worcester)	Republican	March 4, 1863 – March 3, 1869	38th 39th 40th	Elected in 1862. Re-elected in 1864. Re-elected in 1866. [data missing]	1863–1873 [data missing]
George F. Hoar (Worcester)	Republican	March 4, 1869 – March 3, 1873	41st 42nd	Elected in 1868. Re-elected in 1870. Redistricted to the 9th district.	1863–1873 [data missing]
John M. S. Williams (Cambridge)	Republican	March 4, 1873 – March 3, 1875	43rd	Elected in 1872. [data missing]	1873–1883 "Ashland, Wards 22, 23, 25, Boston, Brookline, Cambridge, Dedham, Dover, Framingham, Franklin, Holliston, Hopkinton, Medfield, Medway, Milford, Natick, Needham, Newton, Norwood, Sherborn, Southboro', Watertown, Wayland, and Weston."
William W. Warren (Boston)	Democratic	March 4, 1875 – March 3, 1877	44th	Elected in 1874. Lost re-election.	1873–1883 "Ashland, Wards 22, 23, 25, Boston, Brookline, Cambridge, Dedham, Dover, Framingham, Franklin, Holliston, Hopkinton, Medfield, Medway, Milford, Natick, Needham, Newton, Norwood, Sherborn, Southboro', Watertown, Wayland, and Weston."
William Claflin (Newton)	Republican	March 4, 1877 – March 3, 1881	45th 46th	Elected in 1876. Re-elected in 1878. Retired.	1873–1883 "Ashland, Wards 22, 23, 25, Boston, Brookline, Cambridge, Dedham, Dover, Framingham, Franklin, Holliston, Hopkinton, Medfield, Medway, Milford, Natick, Needham, Newton, Norwood, Sherborn, Southboro', Watertown, Wayland, and Weston."
John W. Candler (Brookline)	Republican	March 4, 1881 – March 3, 1883	47th	Elected in 1880. [data missing]	1873–1883 "Ashland, Wards 22, 23, 25, Boston, Brookline, Cambridge, Dedham, Dover, Framingham, Franklin, Holliston, Hopkinton, Medfield, Medway, Milford, Natick, Needham, Newton, Norwood, Sherborn, Southboro', Watertown, Wayland, and Weston."
William A. Russell (Lawrence)	Republican	March 4, 1883 – March 3, 1885	48th	Redistricted from the 7th district and re-elected in 1882. [data missing]	1883–1893 [data missing]
Charles H. Allen (Lowell)	Republican	March 4, 1885 – March 3, 1889	49th 50th	Elected in 1884. Re-elected in 1886. Retired.	1883–1893 [data missing]
Frederic T. Greenhalge (Lowell)	Republican	March 4, 1889 – March 3, 1891	51st	Elected in 1888. Lost re-election.	1883–1893 [data missing]
Moses T. Stevens (North Andover)	Democratic	March 4, 1891 – March 3, 1893	52nd	Elected in 1890. Redistricted to the 5th district.	1883–1893 [data missing]
Samuel W. McCall (Winchester)	Republican	March 4, 1893 – March 3, 1913	53rd 54th 55th 56th 57th 58th 59th 60th 61st 62nd	Elected in 1892. Re-elected in 1894. Re-elected in 1896. Re-elected in 1898. Re-elected in 1900. Re-elected in 1902. Re-elected in 1904. Re-elected in 1906. Re-elected in 1908. Re-elected in 1910. [data missing]	1893–1903 Arlington, Boston (wards 9, 10, and 11), Cambridge, Medford, Somerville, and Winchester
Samuel W. McCall (Winchester)	Republican	March 4, 1893 – March 3, 1913	53rd 54th 55th 56th 57th 58th 59th 60th 61st 62nd	Elected in 1892. Re-elected in 1894. Re-elected in 1896. Re-elected in 1898. Re-elected in 1900. Re-elected in 1902. Re-elected in 1904. Re-elected in 1906. Re-elected in 1908. Re-elected in 1910. [data missing]	1903–1913; Arlington, Belmont, Cambridge, Medford, Somerville, Winchester, Woburn.
Frederick Simpson Deitrick (Cambridge)	Democratic	March 4, 1913 – March 3, 1915	63rd	Elected in 1912. [data missing]	1913–1933; Middlesex County: Arlington, Belmont, Cambridge, Lexington, Medford, Melrose, Stoneham, Wakefield, Watertown, Winchester.
Frederick W. Dallinger (Cambridge)	Republican	March 4, 1915 – March 3, 1925	64th 65th 66th 67th 68th	Elected in 1914. Re-elected in 1916. Re-elected in 1918. Re-elected in 1920. Re-elected in 1922. [data missing]	1913–1933; Middlesex County: Arlington, Belmont, Cambridge, Lexington, Medford, Melrose, Stoneham, Wakefield, Watertown, Winchester.
Harry I. Thayer (Wakefield)	Republican	March 4, 1925 – March 10, 1926	69th	Elected in 1924. Died.	1913–1933; Middlesex County: Arlington, Belmont, Cambridge, Lexington, Medford, Melrose, Stoneham, Wakefield, Watertown, Winchester.
Vacant		March 10, 1926 – November 2, 1926	69th		1913–1933; Middlesex County: Arlington, Belmont, Cambridge, Lexington, Medford, Melrose, Stoneham, Wakefield, Watertown, Winchester.
Frederick W. Dallinger (Cambridge)	Republican	November 2, 1926 – October 1, 1932	69th 70th 71st 72nd	Elected to finish Thayer's term and elected to the next term. Re-elected in 1928. Re-elected in 1930. Resigned to become judge of United States Customs Court.	1913–1933; Middlesex County: Arlington, Belmont, Cambridge, Lexington, Medford, Melrose, Stoneham, Wakefield, Watertown, Winchester.
Vacant		October 1, 1932 – March 3, 1933	72nd		1913–1933; Middlesex County: Arlington, Belmont, Cambridge, Lexington, Medford, Melrose, Stoneham, Wakefield, Watertown, Winchester.
Arthur D. Healey (Somerville)	Democratic	March 4, 1933 – August 3, 1942	73rd 74th 75th 76th 77th	Elected in 1932. Re-elected in 1934. Re-elected in 1936. Re-elected in 1938. Re-elected in 1940. Resigned to become judge of US District Court for Massachusetts.	1933–1943; Cambridge (Wards 2, 3), Everett, Malden, Medford, Somerville.
Vacant		August 3, 1942 – January 3, 1943	77th		1933–1943; Cambridge (Wards 2, 3), Everett, Malden, Medford, Somerville.
Angier Goodwin (Melrose)	Republican	January 3, 1943 – January 3, 1955	78th 79th 80th 81st 82nd 83rd	Elected in 1942. Re-elected in 1944. Re-elected in 1946. Re-elected in 1948. Re-elected in 1950. Re-elected in 1952. Lost re-election.	1943–1953; Everett, Lynnfield, Malden, Medford, Melrose, N. Reading, Reading, Saugus, Somerville (Wards 4, 5, 6, 7), Stoneham, Wakefield.
Angier Goodwin (Melrose)	Republican	January 3, 1943 – January 3, 1955	78th 79th 80th 81st 82nd 83rd	Elected in 1942. Re-elected in 1944. Re-elected in 1946. Re-elected in 1948. Re-elected in 1950. Re-elected in 1952. Lost re-election.	1953–1963 [data missing]
Torbert H. Macdonald (Malden)	Democratic	January 3, 1955 – January 3, 1963	84th 85th 86th 87th	Elected in 1954. Re-elected in 1956. Re-elected in 1958. Re-elected in 1960. Redistricted to 7th district.	1953–1963 [data missing]
Tip O'Neill (Cambridge)	Democratic	January 3, 1963 – January 3, 1987	88th 89th 90th 91st 92nd 93rd 94th 95th 96th 97th 98th 99th	Redistricted from the 11th district and re-elected in 1962. Re-elected in 1964. Re-elected in 1966. Re-elected in 1968. Re-elected in 1970. Re-elected in 1972. Re-elected in 1974. Re-elected in 1976. Re-elected in 1978. Re-elected in 1980. Re-elected in 1982. Re-elected in 1984. Retired.	1963–1973; Boston (Wards 1, 2, 3, 21, 22), Brookline, Cambridge, Somerville.
Tip O'Neill (Cambridge)	Democratic	January 3, 1963 – January 3, 1987	88th 89th 90th 91st 92nd 93rd 94th 95th 96th 97th 98th 99th	Redistricted from the 11th district and re-elected in 1962. Re-elected in 1964. Re-elected in 1966. Re-elected in 1968. Re-elected in 1970. Re-elected in 1972. Re-elected in 1974. Re-elected in 1976. Re-elected in 1978. Re-elected in 1980. Re-elected in 1982. Re-elected in 1984. Retired.	1973–1983; Arlington, Belmont, Boston (Wards 1, 2, 5, 21, 22), Cambridge, Somerville, Watertown.
Tip O'Neill (Cambridge)	Democratic	January 3, 1963 – January 3, 1987	88th 89th 90th 91st 92nd 93rd 94th 95th 96th 97th 98th 99th	Redistricted from the 11th district and re-elected in 1962. Re-elected in 1964. Re-elected in 1966. Re-elected in 1968. Re-elected in 1970. Re-elected in 1972. Re-elected in 1974. Re-elected in 1976. Re-elected in 1978. Re-elected in 1980. Re-elected in 1982. Re-elected in 1984. Retired.	1983–1993; Arlington, Belmont, Boston (Wards 1, 2, 4, 5, 21, 22), Cambridge, Somerville, Waltham, Watertown.
Joe Kennedy II (Boston)	Democratic	January 3, 1987 – January 3, 1999	100th 101st 102nd 103rd 104th 105th	Elected in 1986. Re-elected in 1988. Re-elected in 1990. Re-elected in 1992. Re-elected in 1994. Re-elected in 1996. Retired.	1983–1993; Arlington, Belmont, Boston (Wards 1, 2, 4, 5, 21, 22), Cambridge, Somerville, Waltham, Watertown.
Joe Kennedy II (Boston)	Democratic	January 3, 1987 – January 3, 1999	100th 101st 102nd 103rd 104th 105th	Elected in 1986. Re-elected in 1988. Re-elected in 1990. Re-elected in 1992. Re-elected in 1994. Re-elected in 1996. Retired.	1993–2003; Belmont, Boston (Wards 1, 2, 4, 5, 9, 10, 11, 12, 14, 15, 17, 18, 21, 22), Cambridge, Chelsea, Somerville, Watertown.
Mike Capuano (Somerville)	Democratic	January 3, 1999 – January 3, 2013	106th 107th 108th 109th 110th 111th 112th	Elected in 1998. Re-elected in 2000. Re-elected in 2002. Re-elected in 2004. Re-elected in 2006. Re-elected in 2008. Re-elected in 2010. Redistricted to the 7th district.	1993–2003; Belmont, Boston (Wards 1, 2, 4, 5, 9, 10, 11, 12, 14, 15, 17, 18, 21, 22), Cambridge, Chelsea, Somerville, Watertown.
Mike Capuano (Somerville)	Democratic	January 3, 1999 – January 3, 2013	106th 107th 108th 109th 110th 111th 112th	Elected in 1998. Re-elected in 2000. Re-elected in 2002. Re-elected in 2004. Re-elected in 2006. Re-elected in 2008. Re-elected in 2010. Redistricted to the 7th district.	2003–2013 In Middlesex County: Cambridge, and Somerville. In Suffolk County: Boston, Wards 1, 2, Ward 3, Precincts 1–4, 7, 8, Ward 4, Ward 5, Precincts 1, 2, 6–10, Ward 7, Precinct 10, Wards 8–12, Ward 13, Precincts 1, 2, 4–6, Ward 14, Ward 15, Precincts 1–5, 7–9, Ward 16, Precincts 1, 3, Ward 17, Precincts 1–3, 5–12; Ward 18, Precincts 1–8, 13–15, 21, Ward 19, Precincts 1, 3–6, 8, 9, Wards 21 and 22, (the remainder of Boston is in the 9th district), and Chelsea.
Stephen Lynch (Boston)	Democratic	January 3, 2013 – present	113th 114th 115th 116th 117th 118th 119th	Redistricted from the 9th district and re-elected in 2012. Re-elected in 2014. Re-elected in 2016. Re-elected in 2018. Re-elected in 2020. Re-elected in 2022. Re-elected in 2024. Re-elected in 2026.	2013–2023 In Bristol County: Precincts 1 and 2 in Raynham. In Norfolk County: Avon, Braintree, Canton, Cohasset, Dedham, Holbrook, Milton:Precincts 2–4, and 6–9, Norwood, Quincy, Randolph, Stoughton, Walpole, Westwood, and Weymouth. In Plymouth County: Abington, Bridgewater, Brockton, East Bridgewater, Hingham, Hull, Scituate, West Bridgewater, and Whitman. In Suffolk County: Boston, Ward 3: Precincts 1–6; Ward 5: Precincts 3–5, 11; Ward 6, Ward 7: Precincts 1–9, Ward 11: Precincts 9 and 10, Ward 13: Precincts 3, 7, and 10, Ward 16: Precincts 2, 5, 7, 9, 10, and 12, Ward 19: Precincts 1–6, 8, and 9, and Ward 20: Precincts 1, 2, and 4–20.
Stephen Lynch (Boston)	Democratic	January 3, 2013 – present	113th 114th 115th 116th 117th 118th 119th	Redistricted from the 9th district and re-elected in 2012. Re-elected in 2014. Re-elected in 2016. Re-elected in 2018. Re-elected in 2020. Re-elected in 2022. Re-elected in 2024. Re-elected in 2026.	2023–present

== Recent election results ==
2006 General election
Party	Candidate	Votes	%
Democratic	Mike Capuano	125,167	90.65%
Socialist Workers	Laura Garza	12,390	8.99%
Majority		113,066	81.66%
Turnout		137,557	21.81%
Democratic hold			

2008 General election
Party	Candidate	Votes	%
Democratic	Mike Capuano (inc.)	185,530	98.55
Write-ins		2,722	1.45
Total votes		188,252	100.00
Democratic hold			

2012 General election
Party	Candidate	Votes	%
Democratic	Stephen Lynch (incumbent)	263,999	76.1
Republican	Joe Selvaggi	82,242	23.7
n/a	Write-ins	570	0.2
Total votes		346,811	100.0
Democratic hold			

2014 General election
Party	Candidate	Votes	%
Democratic	Stephen Lynch (incumbent)	200,644	98.7
n/a	Write-ins	2,707	1.3
Total votes		203,351	100.0
Democratic hold			

2016 General election
Party	Candidate	Votes	%
Democratic	Stephen Lynch (incumbent)	271,019	72.4
Republican	William Burke	102,744	27.5
n/a	Write-ins	502	0.1
Total votes		374,265	100.0
Democratic hold			

2018 General election
Party	Candidate	Votes	%
Democratic	Stephen Lynch (incumbent)	259,159	98.4
Write-in		4,148	1.6
Total votes		263,307	100.0
Democratic hold			

2020 General election
Party	Candidate	Votes	%
Democratic	Stephen Lynch (incumbent)	310,940	80.7
Independent	Jonathan D. Lott	72,060	18.7
Write-in		2,401	0.6
Total votes		385,401	100.0
Democratic hold			

2022 General election
Party	Candidate	Votes	%
Democratic	Stephen Lynch (incumbent)	189,987	69.7
Republican	Robert Burke	82,126	30.1
Write-in		451	0.2
Total votes		272,564	100.0
Democratic hold			

=== 2024 ===
2024 Massachusetts's 8th congressional district election
Party	Candidate	Votes	%
Democratic	Stephen Lynch (incumbent)	265,432	70.4
Republican	Robert Burke	110,638	29.4
Write-in		760	0.2
Total votes		376,830	100.0
Democratic hold			

U.S. House of Representatives
Preceded by Oklahoma's 3rd congressional district	Home district of the speaker January 4, 1977 – January 3, 1987	Succeeded by Texas's 12th congressional district
