= Mark Cusack =

American politician

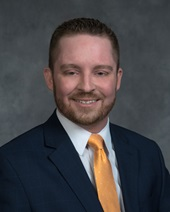

Member of the Massachusetts House of Representatives from the 5th Norfolk district
- Incumbent
- Assumed office January 5, 2011
- Preceded by: Joseph R. Driscoll

Personal details
- Born: July 3, 1984 (age 42)
- Party: Democratic
- Education: University of Massachusetts Amherst
- Occupation: Politician
- Committees: House Chair, Joint Committee on Revenue

Mark James Cusack (born July 3, 1984) is an American politician who represents the 5th Norfolk District in the Massachusetts House of Representatives. A member of the Democratic Party, Cusack's district encompasses all precincts in the town of Braintree and Precinct 1 and 2 in the town of Holbrook.

== Public life ==
Cusack graduated from Braintree High School in 2003 and the University of Massachusetts Amherst in 2007 with a B.A. in Political Science. He interned for Congressman Stephen Lynch and prior to his election to the House in 2010, worked as an assistant to Braintree Mayor Joseph Sullivan.

In 2011, Cusack was sworn into the Massachusetts House of Representatives, where he is currently in his seventh term.

Cusack has served as House Chair for the Joint Committee on Revenue since 2019. He previously served as Chair for the Joint Committee on Marijuana Policy and the Committee on Technology and Intergovernmental Affairs, and Vice Chair for the Joint Committee on Telecommunications, Utilities, and Energy.

Additionally, Cusack served as a member of the Online Gaming, Fantasy Sports Gaming and Daily Fantasy Sports Commission, having been appointed by then-House Speaker Robert DeLeo in 2016. He currently sits on the Tax Expenditure Review Commission.

== Marijuana Policy Committee ==
On November 8, 2016, during the Presidential Election voters of Massachusetts were able to vote on a ballot initiative (Question 4) to legalize adult-use marijuana in the Commonwealth of Massachusetts. The question passed by a percentage of 53.7% Yes to 46.3% No. An extension was then passed by the legislature and the Governor in order for the legislature to review the current law as it stood. The task was to create a law that maintained the will of the voters, while making sure there were the correct consumer protection, public safety, and economic equality in the industry of marijuana. This task was given to the newly created Joint Committee on Marijuana Policy.

Cusack was appointed Chairman for the Joint Committee on Marijuana Policy by Speaker Robert Deleo at the beginning of the 190th Session of the Massachusetts General Court (2016–18). The committee held five public hearings in a three month period to hear from elected officials, experts in the industry, law enforcement, veterans, concerned constituents, patients, and many other individuals whom testified with information pertaining to legalizing adult-use marijuana. The Committee did not reach a consensus bill between the House of Representatives and Senate, therefore two separate bills were passed in June 2016. The House bill was "an act to ensure the public health and safety of patient and consumer access to medical and adult use of marijuana in the Commonwealth" (House, No. 3776), and the Senate amendment to that bill was Senate No. 2097. A Conference Committee was appointed, whereas Cusack was one of the three members of the House of Representatives, in hopes to come to an agreement on a consensus bill. A consensus bill was signed by all conferees (6-0) in favor to pass and "An act to safe access to marijuana" (House No. 3818) was signed by Governor Charlie Baker on July 28, 2017.

== Special Commission on Online Gaming, Fantasy Sports Gaming and Daily Fantasy Sports ==
A special commission on online gaming, fantasy sports gaming and daily fantasy sports was created through the Economic Development Bill signed by Gov. Baker in 2016. This commission has nine commissioners appointed including the two co-chairs. Cusack was the appointment of Speaker Deleo to represent the leadership within the House of Representatives along with the Co-Chair. The commission's directive entailed a comprehensive study of the regulations surrounding daily fantasy sports and online gaming, which was officially legitimatized by Attorney General Maura Healey through the AGO's final regulations in January, 2016. Meetings of the special commission took place throughout 2016-17, totaling eight, where the commissioners listened to testimony from experts in gaming, esports, daily fantasy sports, the attorney general's office, casinos, and other fields relating to online gaming in Massachusetts.

The special commission met on July 25, 2017, to finalize a report that was to be sent to the legislature for suggestions on how to proceed with online gaming and daily fantasy sports. Some disagreement ensued and the meeting was recessed until July 31, 2017 (the deadline for a report), On July 31, 2017, a final report was given to the commissioners for a vote in order to allow the report to be sent as is to the legislature. In a vote of 5–3 with one commissioner abstaining, the report was sent out of the special commission to the legislature. Cusack dissented to the report for multiple reasons, one of those reasons was defining daily fantasy sports as "online gaming". Another was the negative impact that this definition will have on investors for the DFS companies and the ultimate repercussions that will come to Massachusetts in the loss of innovative businesses.

== See also ==
- 2019–2020 Massachusetts legislature
- 2021–2022 Massachusetts legislature

Political offices
Preceded by Joseph R. Driscoll	State Representative Massachusetts; 2011 –	Incumbent

Political offices
Preceded by New Title	Assistant to the Mayor of Braintree; 2008–2011
