= Maharashtra Protection of Interest of Depositors (in Financial Establishments) Act, 1999 =

Act of the Maharashtra state legislature

Maharashtra Legislative Assembly
- Long title: An Act to protect the interest of depositors of Maharashtra state in the financial establishments and matters relating thereto
- Territorial extent: Whole of Maharashtra
- Enacted by: Maharashtra Legislative Assembly
- Commenced: 29 April 1999
- Status: In force

Maharashtra Protection of Interest of Depositors (in Financial Establishments) Act, 1999 is an act of Maharashtra state legislature in India to protect the interest of depositors of Maharashtra state in the financial establishments and matters relating thereto.
