= Joseph R. Driscoll =

American politician

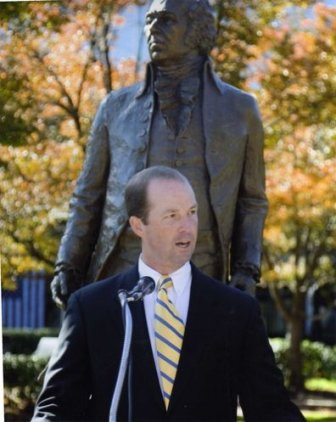

Member of the Massachusetts House of Representatives from the 5th Norfolk district
- In office 2003–2011
- Preceded by: Joe Sullivan
- Succeeded by: Mark Cusack

Personal details
- Party: Democratic
- Spouse: Lauren
- Education: Boston College; New England School of Law; Harvard Kennedy School
- Occupation: Legislator/lawyer
- Committees: Joint Committee on Ways & Means, Joint Committee on Financial Services, Joint Committee on Revenue

Joseph R. Driscoll is an American politician who was a member of the Massachusetts House of Representatives from 2003 to 2011, representing the 5th district of Norfolk County.

== Public life ==
Driscoll was elected to the Massachusetts House of Representatives in 2003. Before being elected to this seat, he started his legal career prosecuting criminal cases in the Middlesex County District Attorney's Office. From there, he became an Assistant District Attorney in Norfolk County under District Attorney William R. Keating. In this capacity, Driscoll led the Sexual Assault and Child Abuse Unit where he was responsible for trying such cases and working with key witnesses, including children. Driscoll was then appointed Assistant Attorney General assigned to the Medicaid Fraud Control Unit, a division dedicated to protecting the elderly from fraud and abuse. He handled high profile Superior Court cases including attempted murder, armed robbery, domestic violence and child abuse cases.

Driscoll represented the town of Braintree, precinct one of the town of Holbrook, and precinct three of the town of Randolph in the Massachusetts House of Representatives. After a campaign for Norfolk County District Attorney, his term ended in January 2011 and he was succeeded by Mark Cusack also of Braintree.

== Affiliations ==
- Boston Bar Association
- Norfolk County Bar Association
- Supreme Judicial Court Historical
- Knights of Columbus Council 1462
- Braintree Historical Society
- East Braintree Civic Association

== Committees ==
- Joint Committee on Ways & Means
- Joint Committee on Financial Services
- Joint Committee on Revenue

Political offices
| Preceded by Joe Sullivan | State Representative Massachusetts; 2003–2011 | Succeeded by Mark Cusack |
| elected | Braintree Board of Selectmen; 2002–2003 | elected as state representative |
Party political offices
| appointed | Braintree Democratic Town Committee; 1994 – | Incumbent |
Court offices
| appointed | Assistant District Attorney; 1998–2001 | |
| appointed | Assistant Attorney General; 2001–2002 | |
Notes and references
1. Massachusetts State Legislature
