= Rachel Kaprielian =

American politician (born 1968)

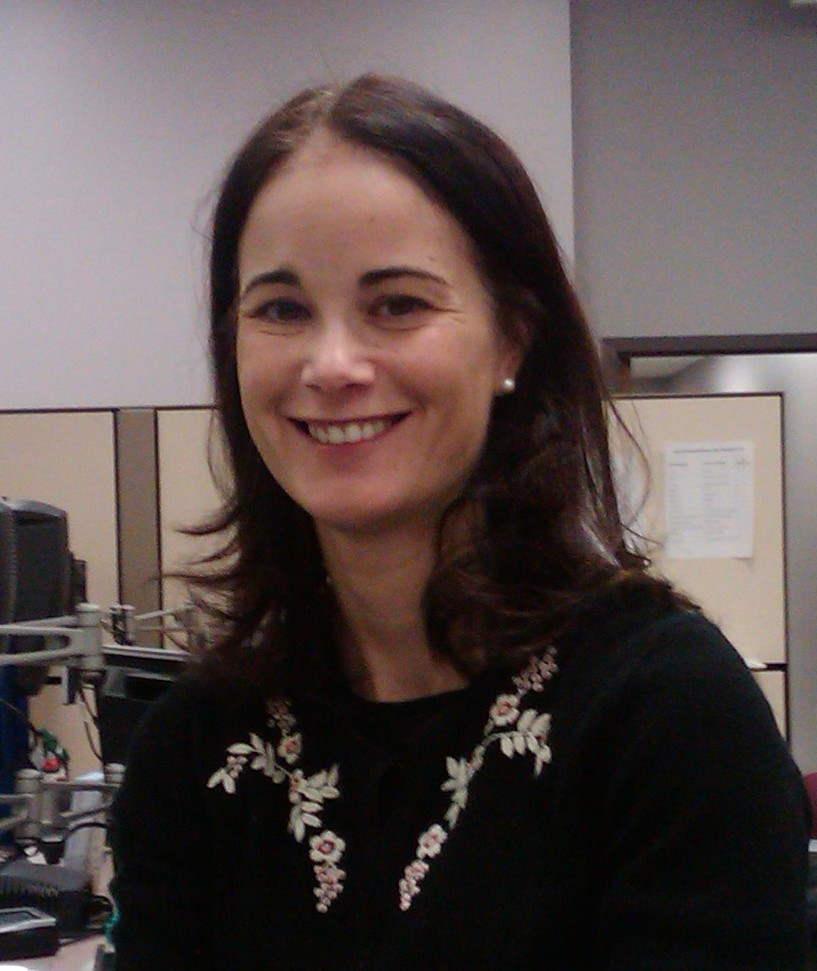
- Kaprielian in 2011

Massachusetts Secretary of Labor and Worforce Development
- In office January 17, 2014 – January 8, 2015
- Governor: Deval Patrick
- Preceded by: Joanne F. Goldstein
- Succeeded by: Ronald L. Walker II

Massachusetts Registrar of Motor Vehicles
- In office 2008–2014
- Governor: Deval Patrick
- Preceded by: Anne L. Collins
- Succeeded by: Celia Blue

Member of the Massachusetts House of Representatives from the 29th Middlesex district
- In office 2003–2008
- Preceded by: Timothy J. Toomey Jr.
- Succeeded by: Jon Hecht

Member of the Massachusetts House of Representatives from the 32nd Middlesex district
- In office 1995–2003
- Preceded by: Warren Tolman
- Succeeded by: Mike Festa

Personal details
- Born: June 24, 1968 (age 58) Boston, Massachusetts
- Party: Democratic

Rachel Kaprielian (born June 24, 1968) is an American politician who served as a member of the Massachusetts House of Representatives, Massachusetts Registrar of Motor Vehicles, and Massachusetts Secretary of Labor and Workforce Development.

== Biography ==
Kaprielian was born in 1968 in Boston, Massachusetts. From 1995 to 2008 Kaprielian represented portions of Cambridge and Watertown in the Massachusetts House of Representatives. She finished her law studies at Suffolk University in 2000 and received a Masters of Public Service from Harvard University in 2003. In May 2008 she accepted an appointment as the Massachusetts Registrar of Motor Vehicles from Governor Deval Patrick. She was named Secretary of Labor and Workforce Development on January 17, 2014.

In 2015 she was appointed Regional Director (MA, RI, CT, VT, ME, NH) for the United States Department of Health and Human Services.

Massachusetts House of Representatives
Preceded by Warren Tolman	Member of the Massachusetts House of Representatives from the 32nd Middlesex district 1995–2003	Succeeded by Mike Festa
Preceded by Timothy J. Toomey Jr.	Member of the Massachusetts House of Representatives from the 29th Middlesex district 2003–2008	Succeeded by Jon Hecht
