= Steven Owens =

American politician

Steve Owens
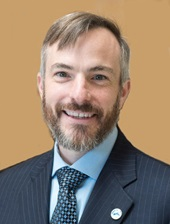

Member of the Massachusetts House of Representatives from the 29th Middlesex district
- Incumbent
- Assumed office January 6, 2021
- Preceded by: Jon Hecht

Personal details
- Born: Steven C. Owens East Greenbush, New York, U.S.
- Party: Democratic
- Education: Brown University (BA)

Steven C. Owens is an American politician serving as a member of the Massachusetts House of Representatives from the 29th Middlesex district. Elected in November 2020, he assumed office on January 6, 2021.

== Early life and education ==
Ownes was born and raised in East Greenbush, New York. He earned a Bachelor of Arts degree in computer science and political science from Brown University in 1999.

== Career ==
After graduating from college, Owens worked as a software developer in San Francisco. He then worked as a software analyst for Reebie Associates, a subsidiary of IHS Markit, from 2002 to 2005. Owens then worked as a consultant for Global Insight and became a senior consultant at IHS in 2012. Owens served as a member of the Watertown Democratic Town Committee for 12 years. He was also a member of the Massachusetts Democratic State Committee and Watertown Transportation Task Force. Owens was elected to the Massachusetts House of Representatives in November 2020 and assumed office on January 6, 2021.
