= Jon Hecht =

Politician in Massachusetts, US

Member of the Massachusetts House of Representatives from the 29th Middlesex district
- In office January 7, 2009 – January 6, 2021
- Preceded by: Rachel Kaprielian
- Succeeded by: Steve Owens

Personal details
- Born: Jonathan Hecht Cambridge, Massachusetts, U.S.
- Party: Democratic
- Spouse: Lora Sabin
- Children: 4
- Education: Stanford University (AB); Harvard University (JD); Tufts University (MA)

Jonathan Hecht is an American attorney and politician who served as a member of the Massachusetts House of Representatives for the 29th Middlesex district from 2009 to 2021.

== Early life and education ==
Born in Cambridge, Massachusetts, Hecht spent his youth in Belmont, attending Belmont Public Schools. He received a Bachelor of Arts degree in history from Stanford University in 1981, a Juris Doctor from Harvard Law School in 1988, and a Master of Arts in law and diplomacy from The Fletcher School of Law and Diplomacy at Tufts University in 1990.

== Career ==
Hecht was a New York City attorney before working as a program officer for human rights and governance for the Ford Foundation in Beijing from 1990 to 1994. He was a research fellow and law lecturer in East Asian legal studies at Harvard Law School from 1994 to 1998. He co-founded the China Law Center at Yale Law School in 1999 and was its deputy director until 2006.

A former board member of the Arsenal Center for the Arts, Hecht won a seat on the Watertown Town Council in 2005, later serving as chair the council's budget, economic development, and rules committees.

Elected as a Democrat to the 29th Middlesex District seat in the Massachusetts House of Representatives in 2008, Hecht was Vice Chair of the Elder Affairs Committee and was a member of the House Committee on Post Audit and Oversight and the Joint Committee on Children, Families and Persons with Disabilities. He was a member of the Mental Health Caucus, Massachusetts Bay Transportation Authority Caucus, and Urban Parks Caucus.

In December 2011, Hecht was a candidate for the Democratic nomination in the special election to replace Steven Tolman in the Massachusetts Senate, but lost to state representative Will Brownsberger in the primary election.

== Personal life ==
Hecht and his wife Lora Sabin, a public health economist at Boston University School of Public Health, reside in Watertown and have four children. He is Jewish.

== See also ==
- 2019–2020 Massachusetts legislature

Massachusetts House of Representatives
Preceded by Rachel Kaprielian	Member of the Massachusetts House of Representatives from the 29th Middlesex district January 7, 2009–January 6, 2021	Succeeded by Steven Owens
