= Joanne Goldstein =

American politician

Massachusetts Secretary of Labor and Worforce Development
- In office January 2010 – January 2014
- Governor: Deval Patrick
- Preceded by: Suzanne M. Bump
- Succeeded by: Rachel Kaprielian

Personal details
- Born: 1949 or 1950 (age 76–77)
- Education: University of Michigan; Hofstra University School of Law
- Occupation: Lawyer

Joanne Feinberg Goldstein (c. 1950) is an American labor attorney and former Massachusetts Secretary of Labor and Workforce Development.

A graduate of the University of Michigan and the Hofsta University Law School, Goldstein began her legal career practicing union side labor law with Angoff, Goldman, Manning, Pyle and Wanger in Boston. She was the first woman to practice union-side labor law in Massachusetts. She opened her own practice in 1982 and in 1996 she was named General Counsel for the Utility Workers Union of America. In 2007, she was appointed by Massachusetts Attorney General Martha Coakley as Chief of the Attorney General's Fair Labor Division. In January 2010, she was appointed by Governor Deval Patrick to succeed Suzanne M. Bump as Secretary of Labor and Workforce Development. She was replaced by Patrick on January 17, 2014.
