= Eileen Duff =

American politician

Member of the Massachusetts Governor's Council from the 5th district
- In office January 3, 2013 – January 2, 2025
- Preceded by: Mary-Ellen Manning
- Succeeded by: Eunice Zeigler

Personal details
- Born: October 4, 1959 (age 66) Peabody, Massachusetts, U.S.
- Party: Democratic
- Education: Trinity Washington University (BA); Cambridge College (MA); Wisdom University (PhD)

Eileen R. Duff is an American politician serving as the Register of Deeds of Southern Essex County. She was previously a member of the Massachusetts Governor's Council. She was the only member of the LGBTQ+ community on the council. She is the first openly LBGTQ+ person to ever serve as a Constitutional Officer.

== Early life and education ==
Duff was born to Mary Galluzzi Duff and Paul Duff and grew up in Peabody, Massachusetts. She holds a master's degree in management and a Doctoral Degree in Ministry.

== Career ==
Duff has been active in Massachusetts politics since a young age, interning twice at the Massachusetts State House and later in the United States Capitol with Nicholas Mavroules. She was later appointed by President Bill Clinton as a confidential assistant to Commissioner Rachelle B. Chong at the Federal Communications Commission.

Prior to running for public office, Duff worked as a chaplain for the Hospice of the North Shore and Greater Boston and as a realtor.

=== Political career ===
In 2012, Duff won a seat on the Massachusetts Governor's Council.

In 2022, following the State Auditor Suzanne Bump's announcement that she would not seek another term, Eileen announced her candidacy for State Auditor. Upon her declaration of candidacy, Duff received endorsements from Governor's Councilor Mary Hurley and State Representatives Tram Nguyen and Tom Walsh. On June 11, 2021, Duff withdrew her candidacy for Auditor, due to a family health situation. In May, 2022 Duff endorsed State Senator Diana DiZoglio's candidacy for Auditor.

In August, 2023 Eileen Duff declared her candidacy for Register of Deeds of Southern Essex County to succeed John O'Brien. She was elected in November 2024 and was succeeded on the Governor's Council by Eunice Ziegler, who she had endorsed.

== Electoral history ==
=== Results ===
In 2022, Duff faced no opposition in the Democratic Primary.

2022 Governor's Council General Election 5th District
Party	Candidate	Votes	%
Democratic	Eileen R. Duff	175,894	59.6
Republican	Michael C. Walsh	119,175	40.4
Write-in		207	0.1
Total votes		295,276	100.0

In the 2020 Democratic Primary and general election, Duff had no challengers.

2018 Governor's Council General Election 5th District
Party	Candidate	Votes	%
Democratic	Eileen R. Duff	200,627	60.1
Republican	Richard A. Baker Jr.	121,144	36.3
Libertarian	Marc C. Mercier	12,129	3.6
Write-in		161	0
Total votes		334,061	100.0

2018 Governor's Council Democratic Primary 5th District
Party	Candidate	Votes	%
Democratic	Eileen R. Duff	48,428	69.6
Democratic	Nicholas S. Torresi	20,810	29.9
Write-in		320	0.5
Total votes		69,558	100.0

2016 Governor's Council General Election 5th District
Party	Candidate	Votes	%
Democratic	Eileen R. Duff	226,341	57.1
Republican	Richard A. Baker Jr.	169,502	42.8
Write-in		576	0.1
Total votes		396,419	100.0

Duff had no opponents in the 2016 Democratic Primary.

2014 Governor's Council General Election 5th District
Party	Candidate	Votes	%
Democratic	Eileen R. Duff	141,584	55.0
Republican	Maura L. Ryan-Ciardiello	115,690	44.9
Write-in		264	0.1
Total votes		257,538	100.0

Duff had no challengers in the 2014 Democratic Primary.

2012 Governor's Council General Election 5th District
Party	Candidate	Votes	%
Democratic	Eileen R. Duff	204,608	57.0
Republican	Maura L. Ryan-Ciardiello	153,398	42.8
Write-in		750	0.2
Total votes		358,756	100.0

2012 Governor's Council Democratic Primary 5th District
Party	Candidate	Votes	%
Democratic	Eileen R. Duff	13,573	43.3
Democratic	Donald R. Bumiller	6,578	21.0
Democratic	David W. Eppley	5,961	19.0
Democratic	George T. O'Brine	4,949	15.8
Write-in		268	0.9
Total votes		31,329	100.0
