= Massachusetts House of Representatives' 5th Norfolk district =

American legislative district

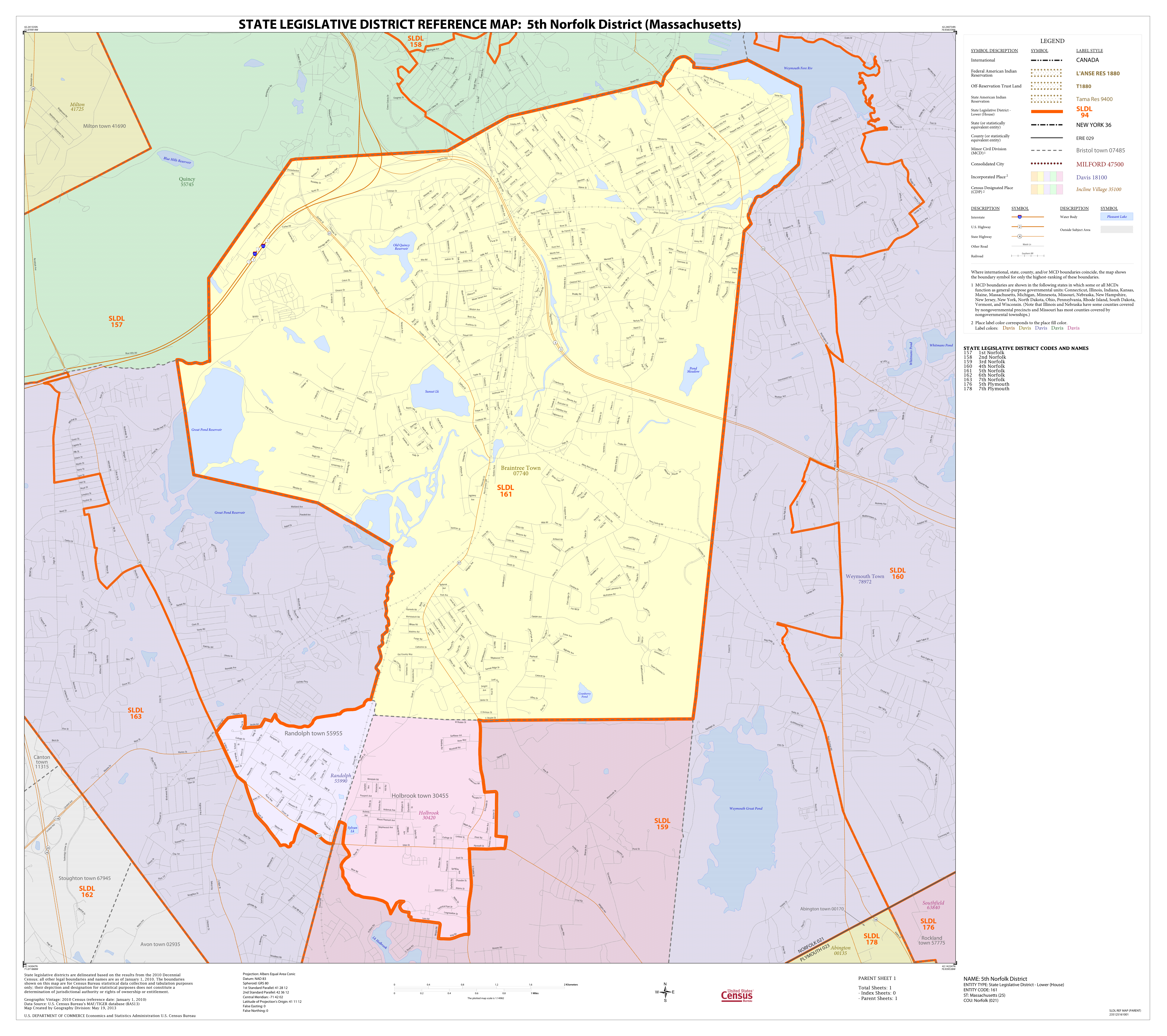
Map of Massachusetts House of Representatives' 5th Norfolk district, based on the 2010 United States census.

Massachusetts House of Representatives' 5th Norfolk district in the United States is one of 160 legislative districts included in the lower house of the Massachusetts General Court. It covers part of Norfolk County. Democrat Mark Cusack of Braintree has represented the district since 2011.

== Towns represented ==
The district includes the following localities:

- Braintree
- part of Holbrook
- part of Randolph

The current district geographic boundary overlaps with those of the Massachusetts Senate's Norfolk and Plymouth district and Norfolk, Bristol and Plymouth district.

=== Former locales ===
The district previously covered:

- Dorchester, circa 1872
- Weymouth, circa 1927

== Representatives ==
- George M. Browne, circa 1858
- George Rankin, circa 1859
- Edward H. R. Ruggles, circa 1858-1859
- John Adams Holbrook, circa 1888
- John Flint Merrill, circa 1888
- Josiah Quincy, circa 1888
- Prince H. Tirrell, circa 1920
- Francis Richard Atkinson, circa 1951
- William Augustine Connell, Jr., circa 1975
- Mark Fitzsimmons
- Elizabeth Metayer
- Suzanne M. Bump
- Joseph C. Sullivan
- Joseph R. Driscoll
- Mark James Cusack, 2011-current

Donald J. Laing 1971-1972

== See also ==
- List of Massachusetts House of Representatives elections
- Other Norfolk County districts of the Massachusetts House of Representatives: 1st, 2nd, 3rd, 4th, 6th, 7th, 8th, 9th, 10th, 11th, 12th, 13th, 14th, 15th
- List of Massachusetts General Courts
- List of former districts of the Massachusetts House of Representatives

== Images ==
Portraits of legislators

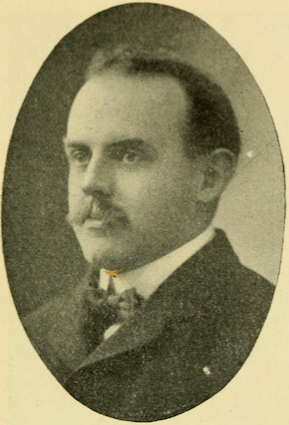
Eugene Hultman

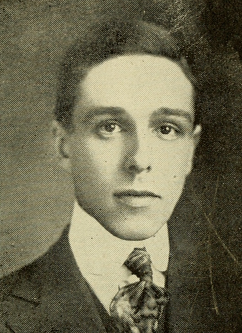
Burgess Spinney

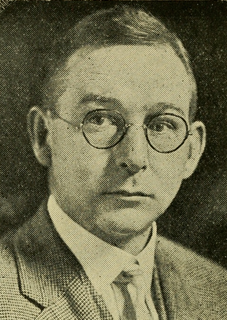
Prince Tirrell

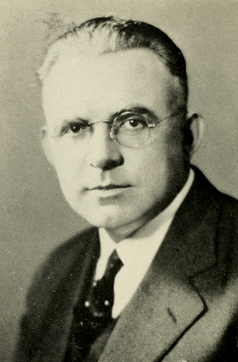
William Hannaford

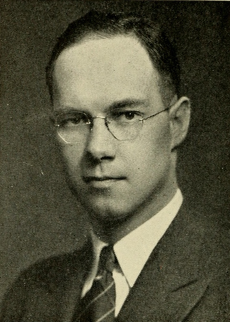
John Webster

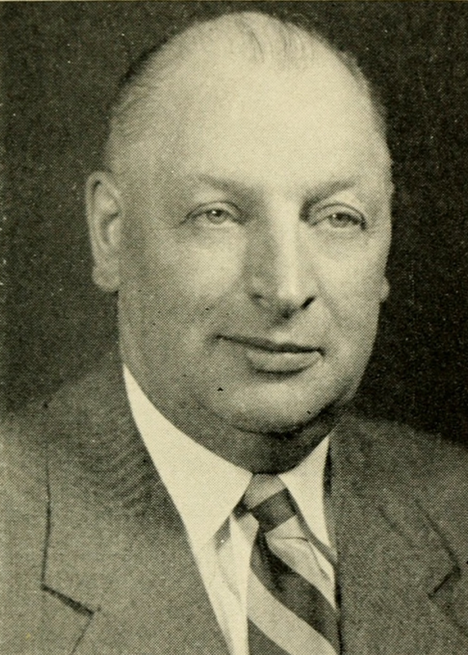
Arthur Dykeman

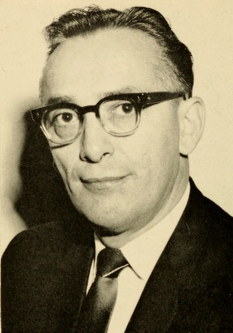
Joseph Semensi

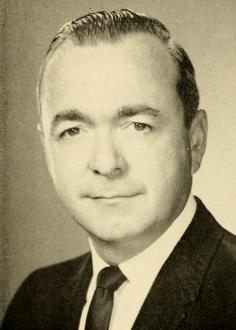
M. Joseph Manning

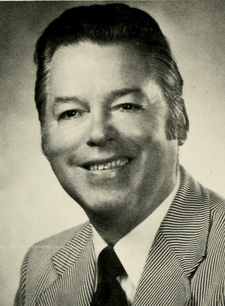
William Connell

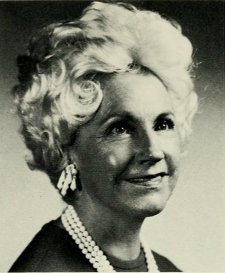
Elizabeth Metayer

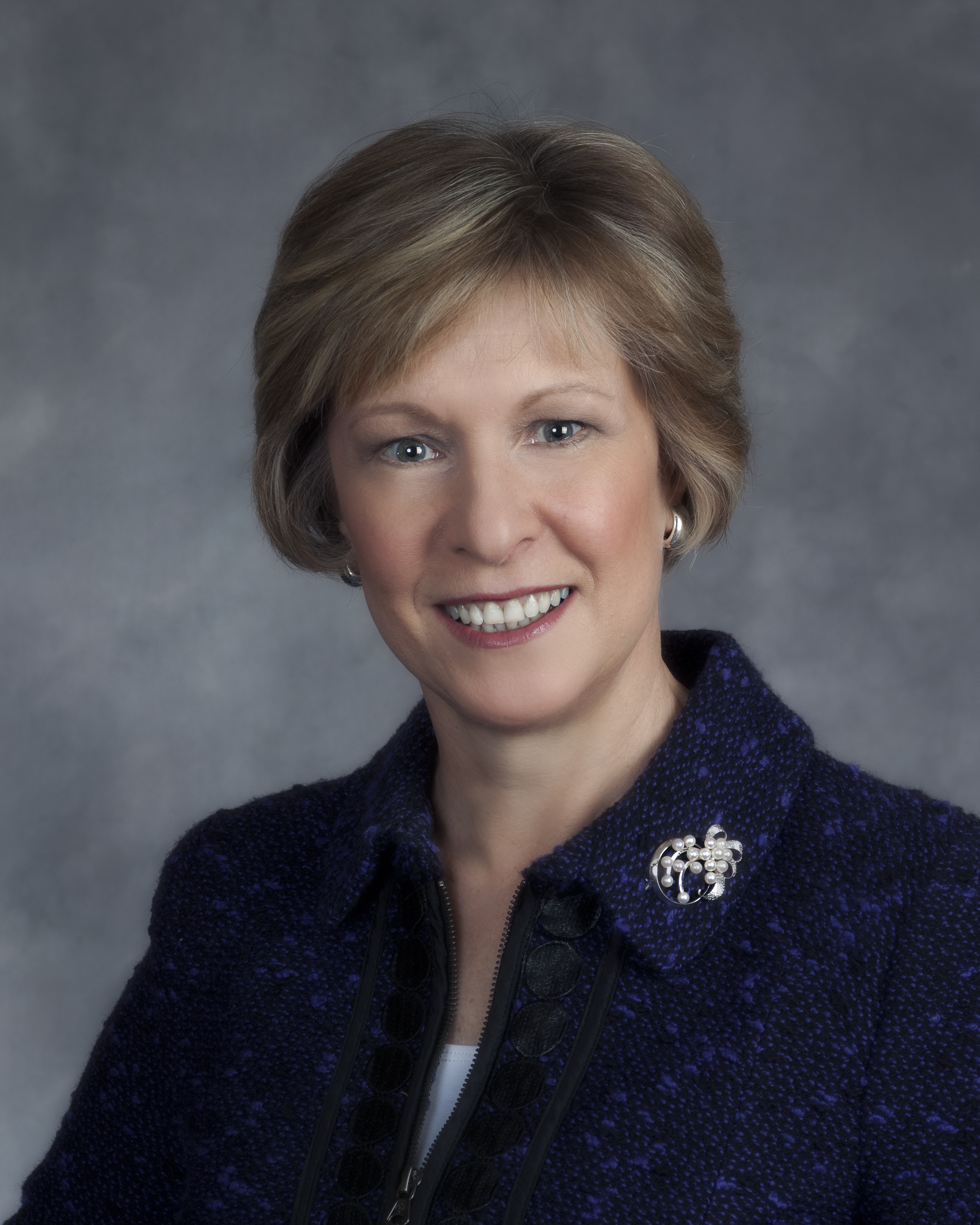
Suzanne Bump

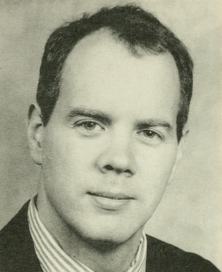
Joseph Sullivan

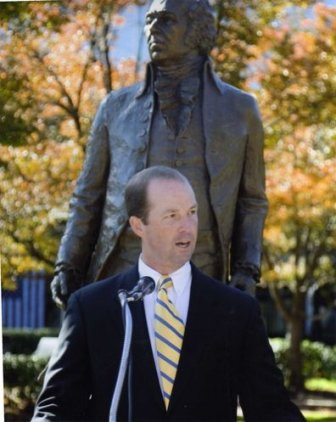
Joseph Driscoll
