= Joseph Sullivan (mayor) =

Joseph C. Sullivan
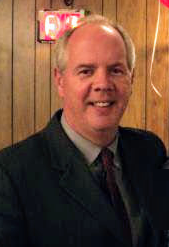

1st Mayor of Braintree, Massachusetts
- In office January 2, 2008 – January 2, 2020
- Preceded by: Position established
- Succeeded by: Charles Kokoros

Member of the Massachusetts House of Representatives from the 5th Norfolk district
- In office 1993–2003
- Preceded by: Suzanne M. Bump
- Succeeded by: Joseph R. Driscoll

Personal details
- Born: March 14, 1959 (age 67) Braintree, Massachusetts, U.S.
- Party: Democratic
- Spouse: Barbara
- Children: 2
- Education: University of Massachusetts Amherst

Joseph C. Sullivan (born March 14, 1959) is an American former politician who served as the first mayor of Braintree, Massachusetts.

== Biography ==
Mayor Sullivan was born and raised in Braintree. His parents are the late James and Betty Sullivan. He attended Ross Elementary School, and graduated from Braintree High School in 1977. Mayor Sullivan graduated from University of Massachusetts Amherst, and also earned a Master of Public Administration degree from the John F. Kennedy School of Government at Harvard University. He is married to wife Barbara and together they have two children, Molly (born 1990) and Patrick (born 1992). In June 2011, Sullivan announced that he was seeking re-election for a second term as Mayor of Braintree. He ran against Paul Walsh, who ran for Braintree Mayor in 2007 but lost in the preliminary election. On November 8, 2011, Sullivan was re-elected for a second term as mayor of Braintree, Massachusetts after defeating his opponent Paul Walsh. Sullivan was sworn in for a second term as mayor on January 3, 2012. In February 2012, Mayor Joseph Sullivan was elected the first vice president of the Massachusetts Mayors Association. Mayor Sullivan planned to seek re-election in 2015 for a third term as Mayor of Braintree, Massachusetts. He ran unopposed in the November 2015 Braintree town election for Mayor. On April 11, 2019, Mayor Sullivan decided he would not run for re-election as Mayor of Braintree. His last day as Mayor was on January 2, 2020 when he was succeeded by Braintree Town Councilor Charles C. Kokoros.

== Public life ==
- Town Meeting Member for 25 years
- Youngest Selectman of Braintree, elected in 1986 served two three-year terms on the board
- Director of the Braintree Historical Society
- First ran for Massachusetts State Legislature in 1992; won that election and five more to serve 1993-2003 during which Chairman of the House Committee on Transportation from January 1997 to February 2003
- In 2007 succeeded by Joseph R. Driscoll, who had been a legislative aide to Sullivan.
- February 2003 appointed Executive Director of the Massachusetts Lottery; in charge of 400 employees, five regional offices, and the allocation of $4 billion of annual revenue.
- Elected as the first mayor of Braintree in the town's 367-year history in November 2007.
- He has had two assistants since his terms as Mayor.

Political offices
Preceded by New title	Mayor of Braintree, Massachusetts; January 2, 2008 - January 2, 2020	Succeeded by Charles Kokoros

Political offices
Preceded by Suzanne M. Bump	State Representative Massachusetts; 1993–2003	Succeeded by Joseph R. Driscoll
