= 2018 Massachusetts elections =

2018 Massachusetts general election
- November 6, 2018

Part of the 2018 United States elections

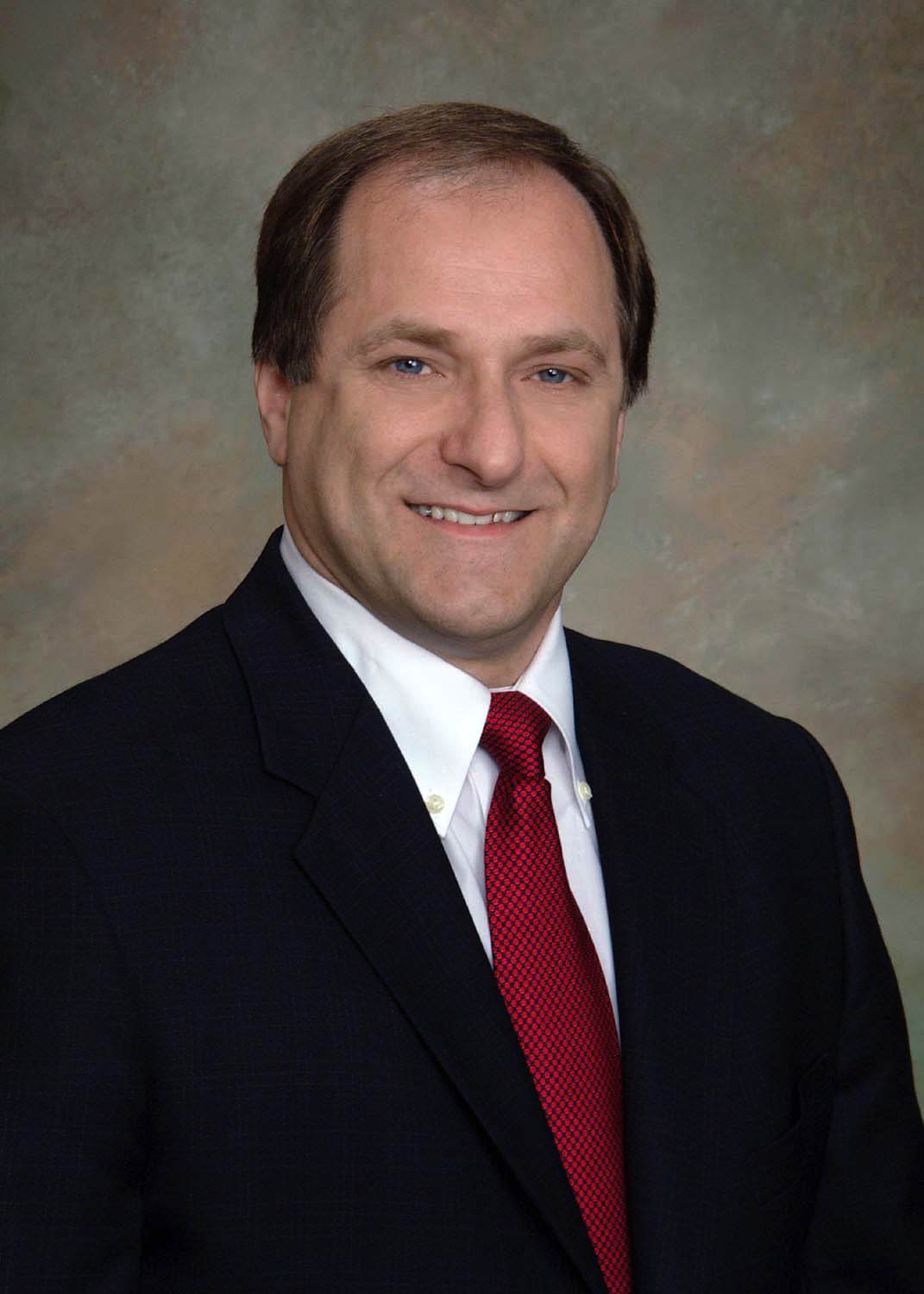
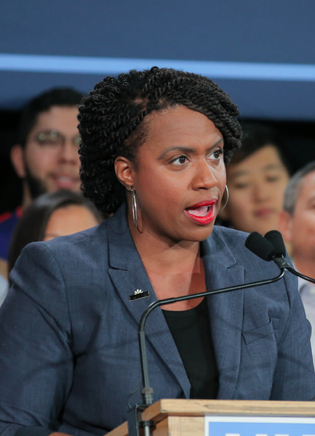
Mike Capuano (left) lost his seat in the U.S. House after being defeated in the September 4 primary election by Ayanna Pressley (right), who was subsequently elected on November 6.

The 2018 Massachusetts general election was held on November 6, 2018, throughout Massachusetts. Primary elections took place on September 4. Early voting took place from October 22 through November 2.

At the federal level, Elizabeth Warren was re-elected to the United States Senate, and all nine seats in the United States House of Representatives were won by Democratic Party candidates.

Incumbents seeking re-election won all major statewide seats: governor, attorney general, secretary of the Commonwealth, auditor, and treasurer.

In the Massachusetts General Court (state legislature), Democrats gained one seat in the Senate and two seats in the House.

The number of ballots cast, approximately 2.7 million, was the highest ever in Massachusetts for a midterm election.

== Governor and lieutenant governor ==
Incumbent Republican governor Charlie Baker ran for re-election to a second term in office.

Primary elections for governor and lieutenant governor were conducted separately on September 4, 2018, with the Democrats nominating former Patrick administration official Jay Gonzalez and former Obama administration advisor Quentin Palfrey. The Republicans re-nominated Governor Charlie Baker and Lieutenant Governor Karyn Polito.

Baker and Polito were re-elected in the general election.

== Secretary of the Commonwealth ==
2018 Massachusetts secretary of the Commonwealth election
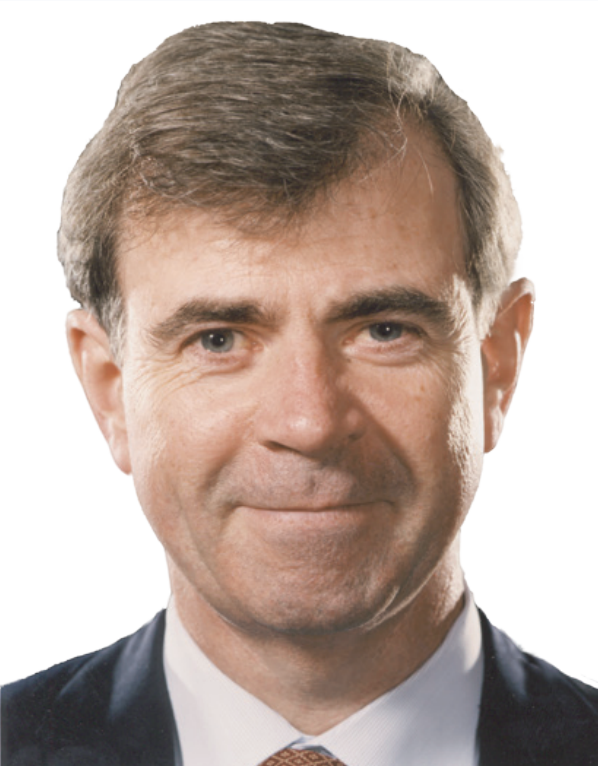

Nominee	William Galvin	Anthony Amore
Party	Democratic	Republican
Popular vote	1,877,065	671,300
Percentage	70.8%	25.3%
- Galvin: 40–50% 50–60% 60–70% 70–80% 80–90% Amore: 50–60%
Secretary of the Commonwealth before election
William Galvin
Democratic
Elected Secretary of the Commonwealth
William Galvin
Democratic

Incumbent Democratic Secretary of the Commonwealth William F. Galvin ran for re-election to a seventh term in office.

The Republican Party nominated Swampscott resident and security expert Anthony Amore.

The Green-Rainbow Party nominated Holyoke resident and community organizer Juan Sanchez.

=== Democratic primary ===
In the primary election, Galvin was re-nominated over Boston City Councilor Josh Zakim.

==== Polling ====
Poll source	Date(s) administered	Sample size	Margin of error	Bill Galvin	Josh Zakim	Other	Undecided
MassINC	June 22–25, 2018	418	± 4.9%	49%	18%	2%	30%

==== Results ====
Democratic primary results
Party	Candidate	Votes	%
Democratic	William F. Galvin (incumbent)	433,086	67.6
Democratic	Josh Zakim	208,011	32.4
Total votes		641,097	100.0

=== General election ===
==== Predictions ====
Source	Ranking	As of
Governing	Safe D	October 11, 2018

==== Results ====
Massachusetts secretary of the Commonwealth election, 2018
Party	Candidate	Votes	%
Democratic	William F. Galvin (incumbent)	1,877,065	70.8
Republican	Anthony Amore	671,300	25.3
Green-Rainbow	Juan Sanchez	100,428	3.8
n/a	Write-ins	1,731	0.1
Total votes		2,650,524	100.0
Democratic hold			

== Attorney general ==
2018 Massachusetts attorney general election
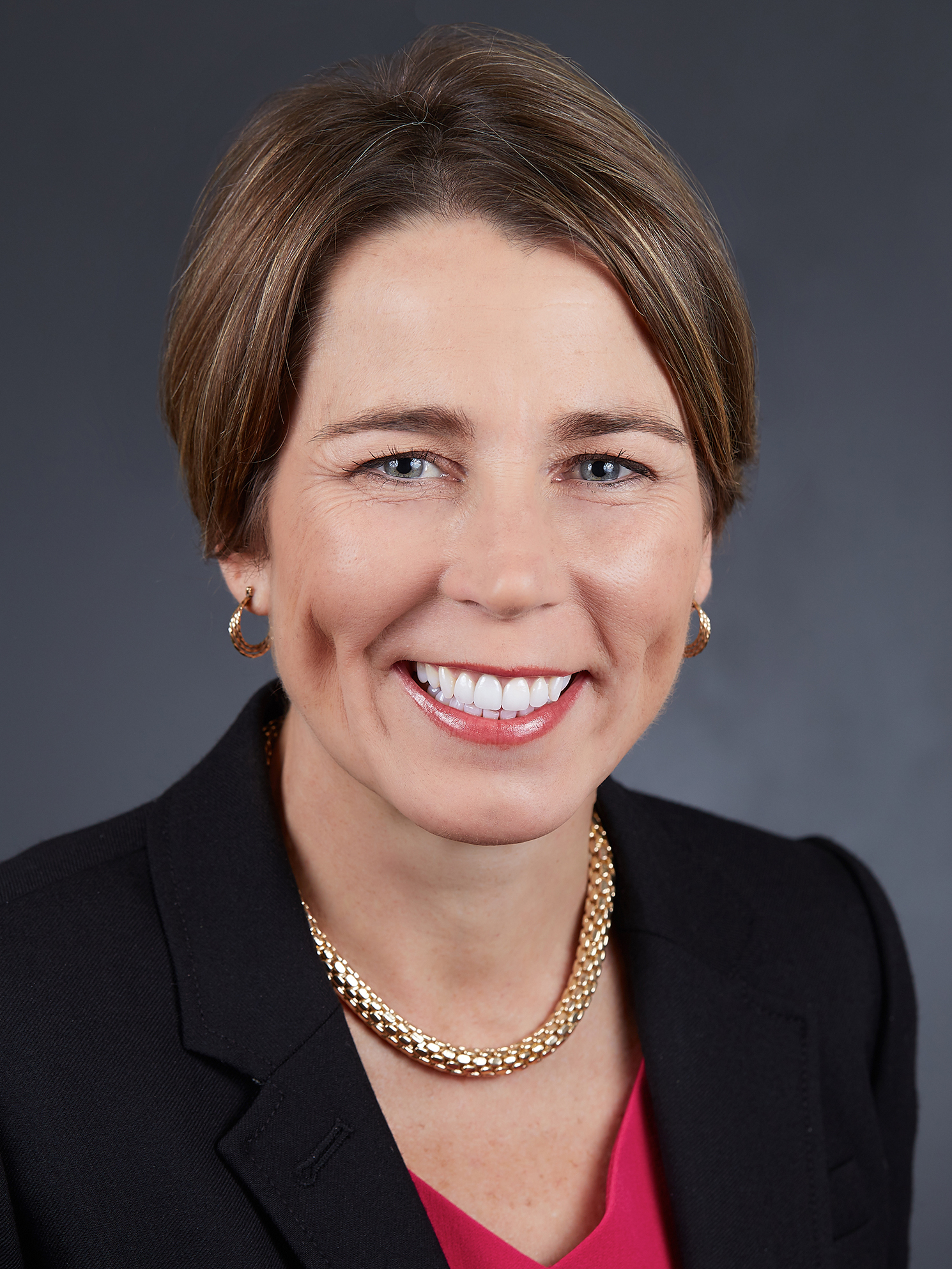

Nominee	Maura Healey	Jay McMahon
Party	Democratic	Republican
Popular vote	1,874,209	804,832
Percentage	69.9%	30.0%
- Healey: 50–60% 60–70% 70–80% 80–90% >90% McMahon: 50–60%
Attorney General before election
Maura Healey
Democratic
Elected Attorney General
Maura Healey
Democratic

Incumbent Democratic attorney general Maura Healey ran for re-election to a second consecutive term. Healey was a speculative candidate for governor but declined to run.

=== Republican primary ===
The Republican Party nominated Bourne attorney James McMahon for attorney general over Hingham attorney Daniel Shores.

==== Results ====
Republican primary results
Party	Candidate	Votes	%
Republican	James McMahon	134,963	61.1
Republican	Daniel Shores	86,098	38.9
Total votes		221,061	100.0

=== General election ===
==== Predictions ====
Source	Ranking	As of
Governing	Safe D	October 26, 2018

==== Results ====
Massachusetts attorney general election, 2018
Party	Candidate	Votes	%
Democratic	Maura Healey (incumbent)	1,874,209	69.9
Republican	James McMahon	804,832	30.0
n/a	Write-ins	1,858	0.1
Total votes		2,680,899	100.0
Democratic hold			

== Treasurer and receiver-general ==
2018 Massachusetts treasurer and receiver-general election
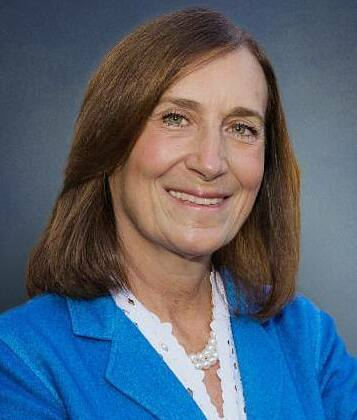

Nominee	Deb Goldberg	Keiko Orrall
Party	Democratic	Republican
Popular vote	1,761,282	749,596
Percentage	67.6%	28.8%
- Goldberg: 40–50% 50–60% 60–70% 70–80% 80–90% Orrall: 40–50% 50–60% 60–70%
Treasurer before election
Deb Goldberg
Democratic
Elected Treasurer
Deb Goldberg
Democratic

Incumbent Democratic Treasurer and Receiver-General Deb Goldberg ran for re-election to a second term in office.

State Representative and Republican National Committeewoman Keiko Orrall was unopposed for the Republican nomination.

The Green-Rainbow party nominated Northampton resident Jamie Guerin. Guerin previously served as Jill Stein's 2016 Massachusetts campaign co-ordinator.

=== General election ===
Massachusetts treasurer and receiver-general election, 2018
Party	Candidate	Votes	%
Democratic	Deb Goldberg (incumbent)	1,761,282	67.6
Republican	Keiko Orrall	749,596	28.8
Green-Rainbow	Jamie Guerin	92,090	3.5
n/a	Write-ins	1,590	0.1
Total votes		2,604,558	100.0
Democratic hold			

== Auditor ==
2018 Massachusetts auditor election
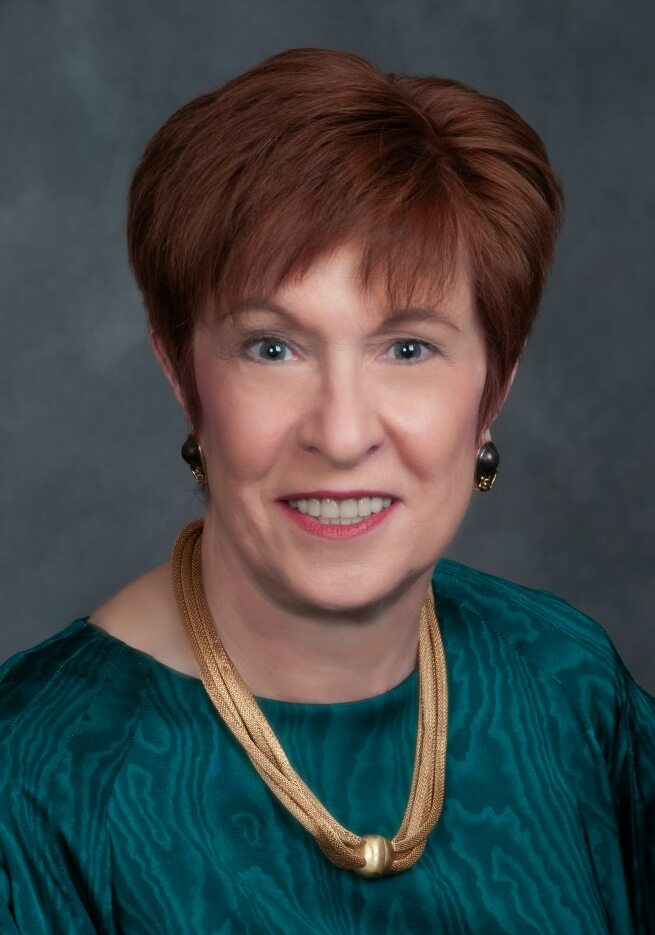

Nominee	Suzanne Bump	Helen Brady
Party	Democratic	Republican
Popular vote	1,606,518	801,583
Percentage	62.1%	31.0%
- Bump: 40–50% 50–60% 60–70% 70–80% 80–90% Brady: 40–50% 50–60%
Auditor before election
Suzanne Bump
Democratic
Elected Auditor
Suzanne Bump
Democratic

Incumbent Democratic auditor Suzanne M. Bump ran for re-election to a third term in office.

Helen Brady, business manager of the Boston Pops and candidate for state representative in 2016, was unopposed for the Republican nomination.

The Libertarian Party nominated former Congressional candidate Daniel Fishman.

The Green-Rainbow Party nominated activist and educator Edward Stamas.

=== General election ===
Massachusetts auditor election, 2018
Party	Candidate	Votes	%
Democratic	Suzanne Bump (incumbent)	1,606,518	62.1
Republican	Helen Brady	801,583	31.0
Libertarian	Daniel Fishman	108,953	4.2
Green-Rainbow	Jed Stamas	67,355	2.6
n/a	Write-ins	1,875	0.1
Total votes		2,586,284	100.0
Democratic hold			

== United States Senate ==
Incumbent Democratic senator Elizabeth Warren ran for re-election to a second term. Her opponents were Republican state representative Geoff Diehl and independent Shiva Ayyadurai. Warren was re-elected in the general election.

Massachusetts Senate election, 2018
Party	Candidate	Votes	%
Democratic	Elizabeth Warren (incumbent)	1,633,371	60.3
Republican	Geoff Diehl	979,210	36.2
Independent	Shiva Ayyadurai	91,710	3.4
N/A	Write-ins	2,799	0.1
Total votes		2,650,524	100.0
Democratic hold			

== United States House of Representatives ==
All of Massachusetts' nine seats in the United States House of Representatives were up for election in 2018.

All nine seats were won by Democratic Party candidates. Seven seats were won by candidates seeking re-election. The 3rd District seat was won by Lori Trahan, after incumbent Niki Tsongas did not seek re-election. The 7th District seat was won by Ayanna Pressley, who defeated incumbent Mike Capuano in the primary election, and then ran unopposed in the general election.

== Massachusetts Senate ==
2018 Massachusetts Senate elections
- November 6, 2018

All 40 seats in the Massachusetts Senate 21 seats needed for a majority
	Majority party	Minority party
Party	Democratic	Republican
Seats before	33	7
Seats won	34	6
Seat change	▲1	▼1

All 40 seats in the Massachusetts Senate were up for election in 2018.

In the general election, the Democratic Party captured 33 seats, while the Republican Party captured six seats. The Republicans had previously held seven seats. The seat gained by the Democrats was in the Norfolk, Bristol and Middlesex district, where challenger Becca Rausch defeated incumbent Richard J. Ross by a two percent margin.

== Massachusetts House of Representatives ==
All 160 seats in the Massachusetts House of Representatives were up for election in 2018.

In the general election, the Democratic Party captured 127 seats, the Republican Party captured 32 seats, and one seat (2nd Franklin) was won by an independent incumbent. The Republicans had previously held 34 seats; Democrats took seats in the 18th Essex and the 17th Worcester districts.

== County ==
Counties in Massachusetts elected county commissioners, district attorneys, registers of probate, and sheriffs.

== Ballot measures ==
There were three statewide ballot questions: Question 1, which would have placed limits on nurse-to-patient ratios, was rejected; Question 2, an initiative to create a panel of citizens to propose amendments to the United States Constitution about campaign finance, was approved; and Question 3, a referendum on a prior law regarding discrimination based on gender identity in public places, was approved, meaning the law would remain in effect.
