= Kathleen O'Connor Ives =

American politician (born 1977)

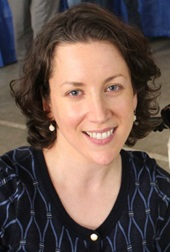
- Official portrait

Member of the Massachusetts Senate from the 1st Essex district
- In office January, 2013 – January 2, 2019
- Preceded by: Steven Baddour
- Succeeded by: Diana DiZoglio

Personal details
- Born: 1977 (age 48–49)
- Party: Democratic
- Spouse: Jeff Ives
- Children: 1
- Education: Mount Holyoke College (BA); Pace University (JD)
- Website: voteforives.com

Kathleen O'Connor Ives (born July 1977) is an American attorney and former Democratic politician from the Commonwealth of Massachusetts.

== Career ==
In 2007, O'Connor Ives became a member of the Newburyport City Council.

In 2012, she was elected to Massachusetts Senate representing the 1st Essex District, which encompasses Amesbury, Haverhill, Merrimac, Newburyport, Methuen, Salisbury, and portions of North Andover. She won a competitive election, defeating former Methuen mayor Bill Manzi and Haverhill resident Tim Coco in the Democratic primary, and two Haverhill school committeemen- Republican Shaun Toohey and independent Paul Magliocchetti- in the general election.

In 2014, Ives ran for a second term. She handily dispatched Jessica Finnochiaro of Methuen in the Democratic primary, and bested Toohey in a rematch in the general election. Ives won a third term in 2016, beating Adele Martino of Haverhill in the primary and facing no general election opposition.

She chaired the Post Audit and Oversight Committee. In March 2018, she announced that she would not seek re-election.

== Early life and education ==
Kathleen O'Connor Ives graduated from Mount Holyoke College, magna cum laude, in 1999 with her Bachelor of Arts in Environmental Politics and International Relations. She later received her Juris Doctor and Environmental Law Certificate, cum laude, from Pace University School of Law in 2007.
