= Diana DiZoglio =

American politician (born 1983)

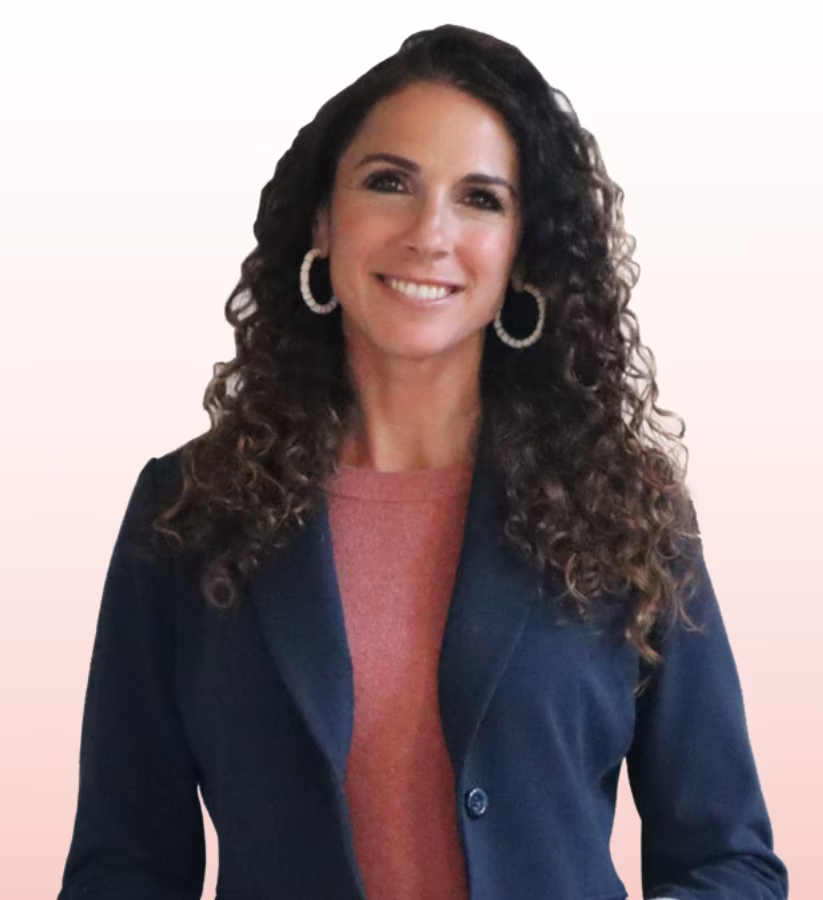

23rd Auditor of Massachusetts
- Incumbent
- Assumed office January 18, 2023
- Governor: Maura Healey
- Preceded by: Suzanne Bump

Member of the Massachusetts Senate from the 1st Essex district
- In office January 2019 – January 5, 2023
- Preceded by: Kathleen O'Connor Ives
- Succeeded by: Pavel Payano

Member of the Massachusetts House of Representatives from the 14th Essex district
- In office January 2013 – January 2019
- Preceded by: David Torrisi
- Succeeded by: Christina Minicucci

Personal details
- Born: June 5, 1983 (age 43) Methuen, Massachusetts, U.S.
- Party: Democratic
- Education: Middlesex Community College (AA); Wellesley College (BA)

Diana DiZoglio (born June 5, 1983) is an American politician who is the current Massachusetts State Auditor. A member of the Democratic Party, DiZoglio had previously represented the 1st Essex District in the Massachusetts Senate from 2019 to 2023. The district included her home city of Methuen as well as Newburyport, Haverhill, Merrimac, Amesbury, Salisbury, and four of eight precincts in North Andover.

DiZoglio also previously represented the 14th Essex district, which included portions of North Andover, Methuen, Lawrence and Haverhill, in the Massachusetts House of Representatives from 2013 until 2019. In June 2021, DiZoglio announced her run for Massachusetts State Auditor and won the 2022 election in November.

She was named one of the 150 most influential Bostonians by Boston Magazine in 2026.

== Early life and career ==
DiZoglio was born in Methuen, Massachusetts, to a teenaged single mother, who worked as a nurse’s aide. They moved around a lot, and DiZoglio had to constantly change schools. She graduated from Methuen High School in 2001. She worked full-time after high school, saving up to attend community college. She graduated from Middlesex Community College with an associate degree in Psychology in 2008 with a 4.0. The director of the Honors Program at her school encouraged her to apply as a transfer student to Wellesley College. As a nontraditional student, she received the Davis Scholarship which covers the full cost of attendance, including housing. She graduated in 2010 with a bachelor degree as a double major in Psychology and Spanish.

Prior to being elected to the Massachusetts House of Representatives, DiZoglio worked as chief-of-staff to Edward A. Kelly, president of the Professional Fire Fighters of Massachusetts (PFFM). She also served as a legislative aide in the Massachusetts House of Representatives, worked for multiple non-profit organizations and was a small business owner.

== Political career ==
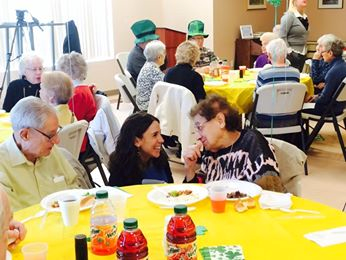
DiZoglio hosting a St. Patrick's Day luncheon at the North Andover Senior Center

=== Massachusetts House of Representatives ===
DiZoglio was elected to the Massachusetts House of Representatives in 2012, running a successful primary challenge to incumbent State Representative David M. Torrisi. In the general election, DiZoglio defeated Republican nominee Karin Rhoton 62.8% to 37.0%.

In 2014, DiZoglio sought a second term. She faced two Democratic primary opponents, Phil DeCologero and Oscar Camargo, who she defeated. She won the general election over Republican nominee Rosemary Smedile.

In 2016, DiZoglio defeated Democratic primary opponent Phyllis Jones by almost a nine to one margin. She won a third term in the general election unopposed.

She had filed legislation aimed at curbing opioid prescriptions and attempted to establish a task force in Massachusetts on protecting elderly and elderly persons residing in public housing.

DiZoglio worked with the Lawrence legislative delegation to secure $145,000 for STEM (science, technology, engineering and math) learning at Greater Lawrence Technical School.

=== Massachusetts Senate ===
In March 2018 DiZoglio announced her candidacy for the 1st Essex District State Senate after incumbent State Senator Kathleen O'Connor Ives announced her decision to not seek reelection. She won the Democratic primary unopposed. On November 6, 2018, she defeated Republican Alexandar Leighton Williams with 66.3% of the vote.

She was the chair of the Joint Committee on Community Development and Small Businesses.

=== Massachusetts Auditor ===
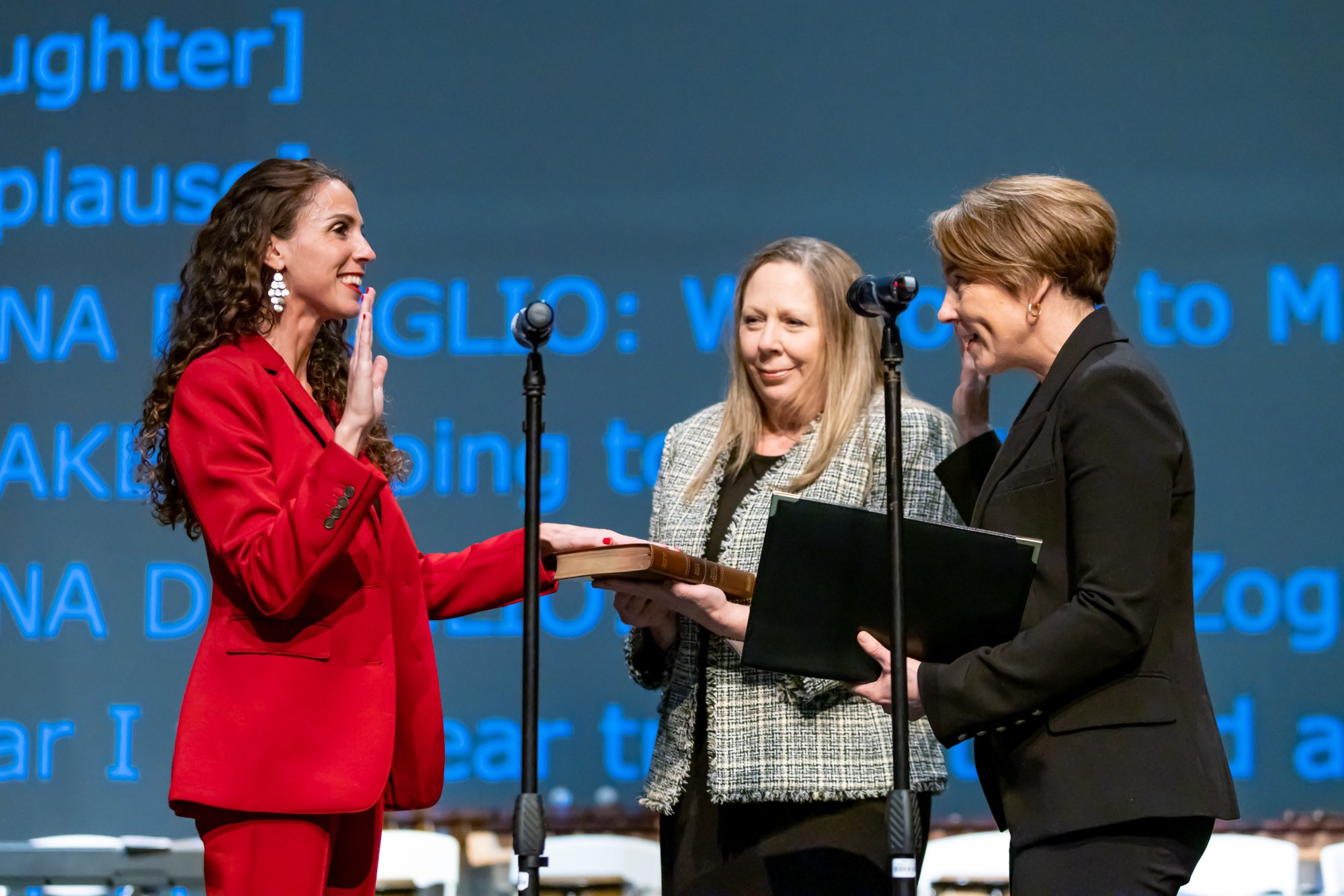
DiZoglio taking an oath of office administered by Governor Maura Healey

In 2022, DiZoglio announced her candidacy for Massachusetts State Auditor. She faced Chris Dempsey in the Democratic primary, defeating him 54.4% to 45.4%. She faced former 2018 Republican nominee for Secretary of the Commonwealth Anthony Amore in the general election, defeating him 55.1% to 37.7%.

DiZoglio campaigned for Auditor with a promise to investigate the state legislature. She started a probe in March 2023, but the leaders of the state House and Senate refused to cooperate, citing state constitution's Article XXX on the separation of powers.

In November 2023, Massachusetts Attorney General Andrea Campbell declined to represent DiZoglio's office in suing the Massachusetts General Court over its non-compliance with the audit. Campbell argued that DiZoglio's proposed ballot measure authorizing the audit would be similarly unconstitutional.

In August 2024, DiZoglio served as Acting Governor of Massachusetts while Maura Healey, Lt. Gov. Kim Driscoll, Secretary of State William F. Galvin, Attorney General Andrea Campbell, and State Treasurer Deb Goldberg were out of state.

== Electoral history ==
2012 Massachusetts House of Representatives 14th Essex district Democratic primary
Party	Candidate	Votes	%
Democratic	Diana DiZoglio	1,602	52.6
Democratic	David Torrisi (incumbent)	1,438	47.2
Write-in		5	0.2
Total votes		5	100.00

2012 Massachusetts House of Representatives 14th Essex district election
Party	Candidate	Votes	%
Democratic	Diana DiZoglio	11,191	62.8
Republican	Karin K. Rhoton	6,595	37.0
Write-in		30	0.2
Total votes		17,816	100.00
Democratic hold			

2014 Massachusetts House of Representatives 14th Essex district Democratic primary
Party	Candidate	Votes	%
Democratic	Diana DiZoglio (incumbent)	1,973	53.5
Democratic	Phil Decologero	1,247	33.8
Democratic	Oscar Camargo	463	12.6
Write-in		5	0.1
Total votes		468	100.00

2014 Massachusetts House of Representatives 14th Essex district election
Party	Candidate	Votes	%
Democratic	Diana DiZoglio (incumbent)	6,732	54.8
Republican	Rosemary Connelly Smedile	5,530	45.0
Write-in		28	0.2
Total votes		12,290	100.00
Democratic hold			

2016 Massachusetts House of Representatives 14th Essex district Democratic primary
Party	Candidate	Votes	%
Democratic	Diana DiZoglio (incumbent)	2,214	88.9
Democratic	Phyllis Ann Jones	251	10.1
Write-in		26	1.0
Total votes		277	100.00

2016 Massachusetts House of Representatives 14th Essex district election
Party	Candidate	Votes	%
Democratic	Diana DiZoglio (incumbent)	15,927	99.2
Write-in		126	0.8
Total votes		16,053	100.00
Democratic hold			

2018 Massachusetts Senate 1st Essex district election
Party	Candidate	Votes	%
Democratic	Diana DiZoglio	46,338	66.3
Republican	Alexander Leighton Williams	23,539	33.7
Write-in		34	0.0
Total votes		69,911	100.00
Democratic hold			

2020 Massachusetts Senate 1st Essex district election
Party	Candidate	Votes	%
Democratic	Diana DiZoglio (incumbent)	72,722	97.8
Write-in		1,617	2.2
Total votes		74,339	100.00
Democratic hold			

2022 Massachusetts State Auditor Democratic primary
Party	Candidate	Votes	%
Democratic	Diana DiZoglio	372,597	54.4
Democratic	Christopher Dempsey	311,156	45.4
Write-in		1,082	0.2
Total votes		684,835	100.00

2022 Massachusetts State Auditor election
Party	Candidate	Votes	%
Democratic	Diana DiZoglio	1,310,773	55.1
Republican	Anthony Amore	897,223	37.7
Green-Rainbow	Gloria A. Caballero-Roca	68,646	2.9
Workers Party	Dominic S. Giannone, III	51,877	2.2
Libertarian	Daniel Werner Riek	48,625	2.0
Write-in		1,648	0.1
Total votes		2,378,792	100.00
Democratic hold			

== See also ==
- 2019–2020 Massachusetts legislature
- 2021–2022 Massachusetts legislature

Party political offices
Preceded by Suzanne Bump	Democratic nominee for Auditor of Massachusetts; 2022, 2026	Most recent
Political offices
Preceded by Suzanne Bump	Auditor of Massachusetts; 2023–present	Incumbent
