= Suzanne Bump =

American politician

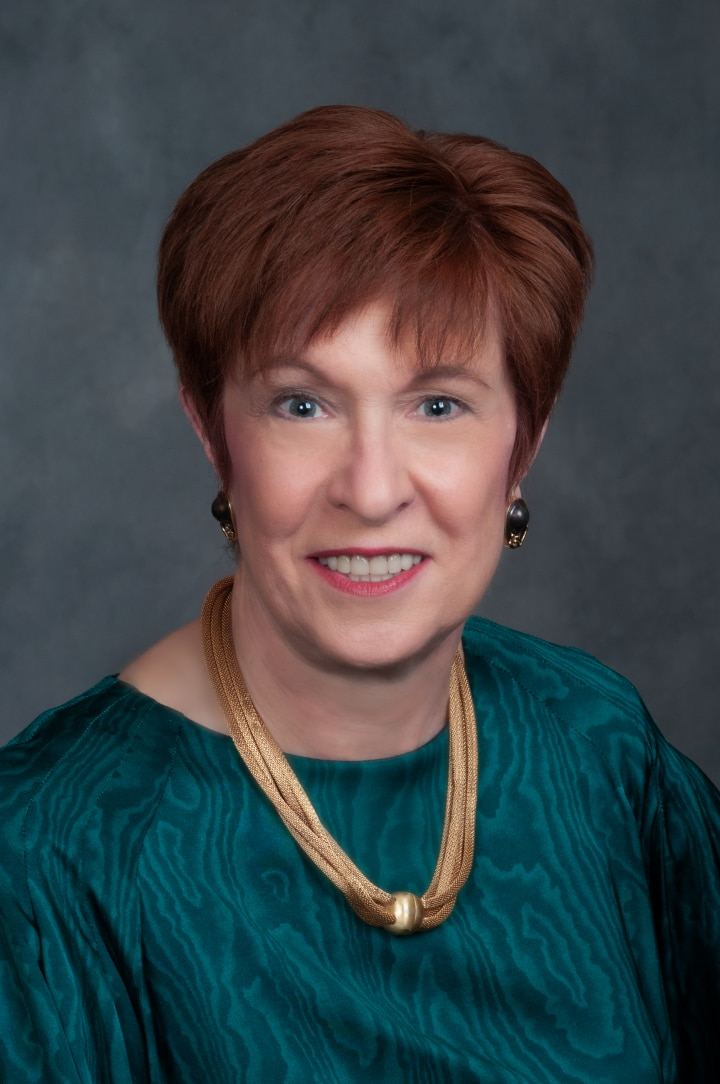

22nd Auditor of Massachusetts
- In office January 19, 2011 – January 18, 2023
- Governor: Deval Patrick; Charlie Baker; Maura Healey
- Preceded by: A. Joseph DeNucci
- Succeeded by: Diana DiZoglio

Massachusetts Secretary of Labor and Workforce Development
- In office 2007–2009
- Governor: Deval Patrick
- Preceded by: Gayl Mileszko
- Succeeded by: Joanne Goldstein

Member of the Massachusetts House of Representatives from the 5th Norfolk district
- In office January 1985 – January 1993
- Preceded by: Elizabeth Metayer
- Succeeded by: Joseph Sullivan

Personal details
- Born: February 18, 1956 (age 70) Weymouth, Massachusetts, U.S.
- Party: Democratic
- Spouse: Paul McDevitt (m. 1980; died 2016)
- Children: 2
- Education: Boston College (BA); Suffolk University (JD)

Suzanne M. Bump (born February 18, 1956) is an American politician who served as Massachusetts State Auditor from 2011 to 2023, the first woman elected to this role in the state's history. She is also a former State Representative and state Secretary of Labor and Workforce Development.

== Early life ==
Bump was born on February 18, 1956, in Weymouth, Massachusetts. Her father was a funeral director and her mother was a homemaker. She attended Cardinal Spellman High School, received her A.B. from Boston College, and received her J.D. from Suffolk University Law School. According to her campaign biography, she grew up in Whitman and moved to Braintree after college. She later moved to Great Barrington.

== Political career ==
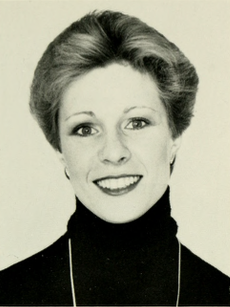
Portrait of Bump, circa 1987

She started her career off as a legislative aide. From 1985 to 1993 she was the state representative for the 5th Norfolk district, She served on the Commerce and Labor Committee, and she spent two years as Chairman of that Committee. From 2007 to 2009 she was secretary of labor in the administration of Governor Deval Patrick.

=== Secretary of Labor ===
Prior to Bump leading the Massachusetts Executive Office of Labor and Workforce Development, unemployment claims were handled on an antiquated processing system. She was noted for securing funding and overseeing the roll out of modern telephone and computerized claims systems. In 2008, Bump announced a regional partnership program that provided new funds to help ex-offenders achieve successful re-entry into communities. The program focused on high crime communities by both providing preventative public safety measures and acting as an economic boost to the regions that received funding.

== Auditor ==
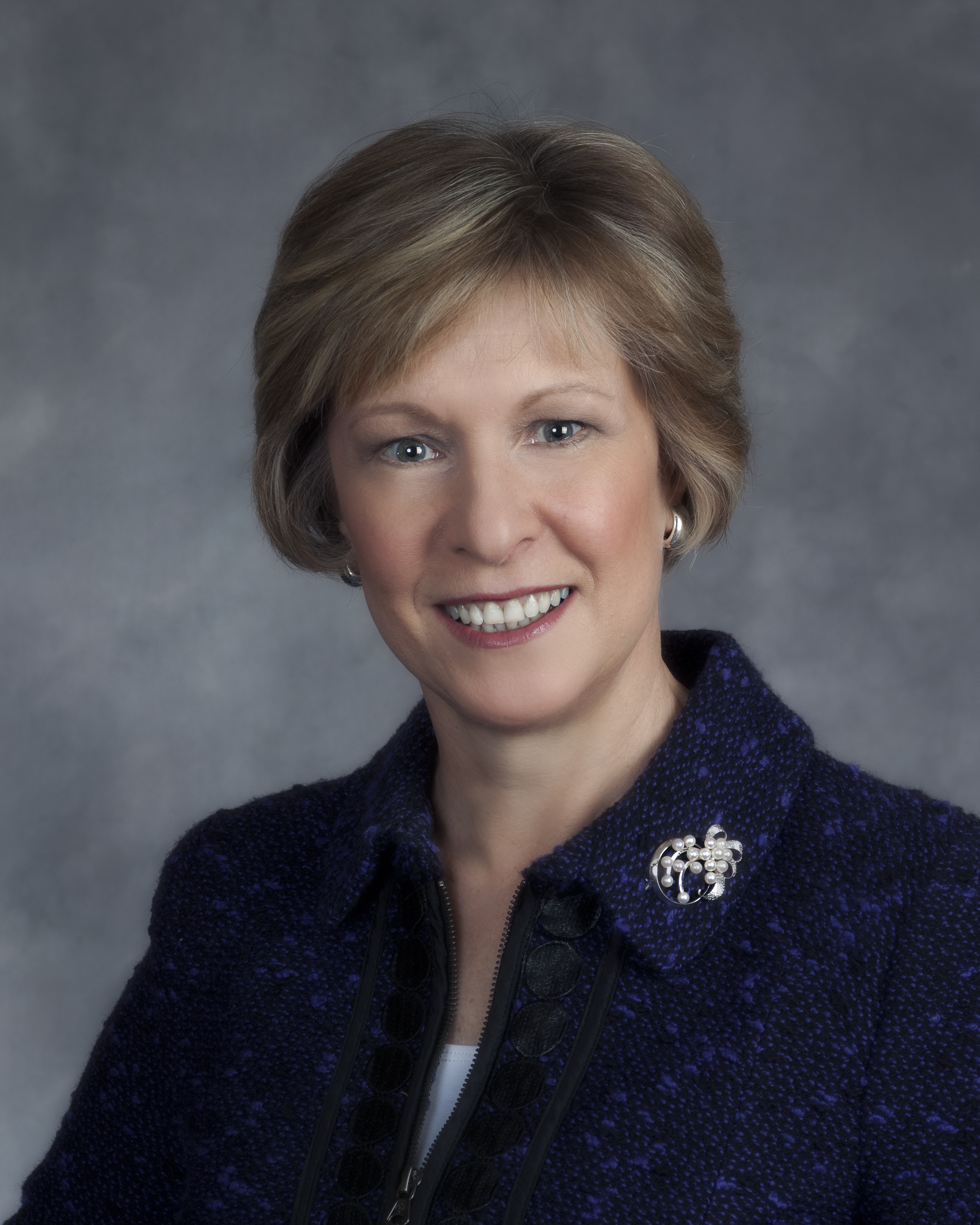
Bump's 2014 portrait

She resigned from Patrick's cabinet in order to enter the race for the position of auditor being vacated by longtime Auditor A. Joseph DeNucci. She won the primary and the general election and was sworn in as the State Auditor of Massachusetts on January 19, 2011. Shortly after taking office, Auditor Bump led sweeping reforms following an independent review of the auditor's office. The review found the office had workers without college level degrees, inadequate training systems, and unspecified job skills. As part of the reform, 27 employees were terminated and 14 were reassigned, and other employers with proper qualifications were given raises on par with national standards. When Auditor Bump took over, the office was failing the National State Auditor's Association peer review standards. In two subsequent reviews, it passed with the highest rating. Her audits, investigations, innovations, and studies have identified over $1.3 billion in misused and wasted spending.

=== Major government agency audits ===
Auditor Bump's office conducts audits, and studies to promote accountability and transparency, improve performance, and make government work better. Her office identified 119 registered sex offender addresses that matched the registered address of a child care provider. Her office has also held the Massachusetts Sex Offender Registry Board accountable for missing addresses of 1,769 convicted sex offenders. Auditor Bump's team also found that the Department of Children and Families had significant deficiencies, including: incomplete records of the background checks on individuals living in foster homes and insufficient training, management, and technological resources for caseworkers. Her office's audit of MassHealth discovered the organization had over $500 million in wasted funds from 2009 to 2014. This audit now saves Massachusetts $10 million each year. Her office released a report that found that Massachusetts regional schools are being underfunded by $17 million. The Auditor recommended new ways to improve previously held assumptions about public education funding.

In the 2018 fiscal year, Auditor Bump continued to execute audits on a wide array of Massachusetts services. She determined that parts of the early voting law that went into effect in 2016 constituted an unfunded mandate on local governments. Her conclusion resulted in Massachusetts communities receiving over $1 million in reimbursements. In the same year, her audit of Salem State University resulted in the school increasing accountability in terms of its IT inventory and making better use of technology to ensure the university continues to adequately track computers, cell phones, servers, and other equipment. She called on the Catastrophic Illness in Children Relief Fund to reduce wait times for families with critically ill children which led to a 33% reduction in wait times. When Barnstable County asked for Auditor Bump's office to conduct an audit of the county government, she helped the community save hundreds of thousands of dollars. The year also included working with Greenfield Community College to improve its accessibility for students with disabilities and ensuring that the Public Employee Retirement Administration Commission (PERAC) was not awarding individuals greater retirement benefits than they are entitled. Through her duty to improve the integrity of public benefits programs, the auditor and her team identified $16.9 million in public assistance fraud in 2017. Since 1983, the Division of Local Mandates in Massachusetts has helped provide over $354 million in state funding, making the auditor's findings in 2017 higher than average.

In 2017, auditees reported that they implemented 92% of audit recommendations.

Bump received a national award from the National Association of State Auditors, Comptrollers and Treasurers.

=== Public benefits audits ===
Through her office's audit of the Department of Veterans Services, plans and recommendations were presented for how to better assist veterans moving forward. A 2013 audit of the Department of Transitional Assistance (DTA) detailed millions of dollars in questionable benefits, inadequate security over blank electronic benefit cards (EBT cards), and a need for improved fraud detection. The audit resulted in the state welfare agency creating an action plan to enhance its program integrity and restore public confidence. Another audit found 1,164 social welfare recipients that were either dead or using a deceased person's Social Security number. Her office "identified $15.4 million in public benefits fraud during fiscal 2016, primarily in the MassHealth insurance program and food stamps".

=== Technology-based audits and changes ===
Auditor Bump's team worked on solutions for data tools, one of which, coined the "Rules Based Risk Engine", won her the National Association of Chief Information Officer's State Recognition Award due to its ability to increase efficiency of the Office of the State Auditor. Her office created an IT audit unit to identify opportunities and potential threats to cyber security. One such audit found many weaknesses in IT security at the Massachusetts Housing Finance Authority.

=== Awards and recognition ===
In addition to her NSAA Excellence in Accountability award, and the National Association of Chief Information Officer's State Recognition award, Auditor Bump has received the Abigail Adams award from the Massachusetts Women's Political Caucus, the Einhorn-Gary Award, "Woman of the Decade" award from Emerge Massachusetts, and the "Woman of Justice" award from Massachusetts Lawyers Weekly. She is currently serving on the boards of the Inspector General Council, Municipal Finance Oversight Board, U.S. Comptroller General's Domestic Working Group, the executive board of the National State Auditor's Association, is a partner of the Women's Suffrage Celebration Coalition of Massachusetts, and is a member of the Massachusetts Women's Political Caucus. In October 2016, Bump announced that she will be running for reelection in 2018 and will stay out of the day-to-day operations of two addiction treatment businesses she inherited from her late husband. Bump hired a new CEO to run them, and she had no authority in the daily operations of the businesses to avoid state conflict of interest regulations.

== Personal life ==
Bump married Paul McDevitt in 1980. They remained married until McDevitt's death in September 2016. She resides in Easton, Massachusetts but often has to commute for job purposes.

== Electoral history ==
Massachusetts House of Representatives 5th Norfolk District Democratic Primary Election, 1984
Party	Candidate	Votes	%
Democratic	Suzanne Bump	3,012	40.5
Democratic	Carl Johnson	1,964	26.4
Democratic	Elizabeth Laing	1,720	23.1
Democratic	Richard Parsons	629	8.5
Democratic	Roy Alonardo	109	1.5
Democratic	Write-ins	8	0.1

Massachusetts House of Representatives 5th Norfolk District Election, 1984
Party	Candidate	Votes	%
Democratic	Suzanne Bump	9,637	54.1
Republican	James Galvin	7,674	43.1
Independent	Donald McCabe, Jr.	509	2.9

Massachusetts House of Representatives 5th Norfolk District Democratic Primary Election, 1986
Party	Candidate	Votes	%
Democratic	Suzanne Bump (inc.)	3,906	69.8
Democratic	Francis Curtis	1,693	30.2
Democratic	Write-ins	1	0.0

Massachusetts House of Representatives 5th Norfolk District Election, 1986
Party	Candidate	Votes	%
Democratic	Suzanne Bump (inc.)	9,492	99.9
Write-ins	Write-ins	5	0.1

Massachusetts House of Representatives 5th Norfolk District Democratic Primary Election, 1988
Party	Candidate	Votes	%
Democratic	Suzanne Bump (inc.)	3,214	57.3
Democratic	Francrs Ioland	2,393	42.7

Massachusetts House of Representatives 5th Norfolk District Election, 1988
Party	Candidate	Votes	%
Democratic	Suzanne Bump (inc.)	13,641	99.9
Write-ins	Write-ins	17	0.1

Massachusetts House of Representatives 5th Norfolk District Election, 1990
Party	Candidate	Votes	%
Democratic	Suzanne Bump (inc.)	10,285	99.7
Write-ins	Write-ins	31	0.3

Massachusetts Auditor Democratic Primary Election, 2010
Party	Candidate	Votes	%
Democratic	Suzanne Bump	198,984	49.4
Democratic	Guy William Glodis	125,974	31.3
Democratic	Mike Lake	76,764	19.1
Democratic	Write-ins	1,028	0.3

Massachusetts Auditor Election, 2010
Party	Candidate	Votes	%
Democratic	Suzanne Bump	1,027,710	48.5
Republican	Mary Connaughton	982,113	46.3
Green-Rainbow	Nathanael Alexander Fortune	108,997	5.1
Write-ins	Write-ins	2,187	0.1

Massachusetts Auditor Election, 2014
Party	Candidate	Votes	%
Democratic	Suzanne Bump (inc.)	1,146,987	57.7
Republican	Patricia Saint Aubin	757,213	38.1
Green-Rainbow	M. K. Merelice	81,430	4.1
Write-ins	Write-ins	2,064	0.1

Massachusetts Auditor Election, 2018
Party	Candidate	Votes	%
Democratic	Suzanne Bump (inc.)	1,606,518	62.1
Republican	Helen Brady	801,583	31.0
Libertarian	Daniel Fishman	108,953	4.2
Green-Rainbow	Edward J. Stamas	67,355	2.6
Write-ins	Write-ins	1,875	0.1

Massachusetts House of Representatives
Preceded by Elizabeth Metayer	Member of the Massachusetts House of Representatives from the 5th Norfolk district 1985–1993	Succeeded by Joseph Sullivan
Political offices
Preceded by Gayl Mileszko	Massachusetts Secretary of Labor and Workforce Development; 2007–2009	Succeeded by Joanne Goldstein
Preceded by A. Joseph DeNucci	Auditor of Massachusetts; 2011–2023	Succeeded by Diana DiZoglio
Party political offices
Preceded by A. Joseph DeNucci	Democratic nominee for Auditor of Massachusetts; 2010, 2014, 2018	Succeeded by Diana DiZoglio
