= Massachusetts House of Representatives' 29th Middlesex district =

American legislative district

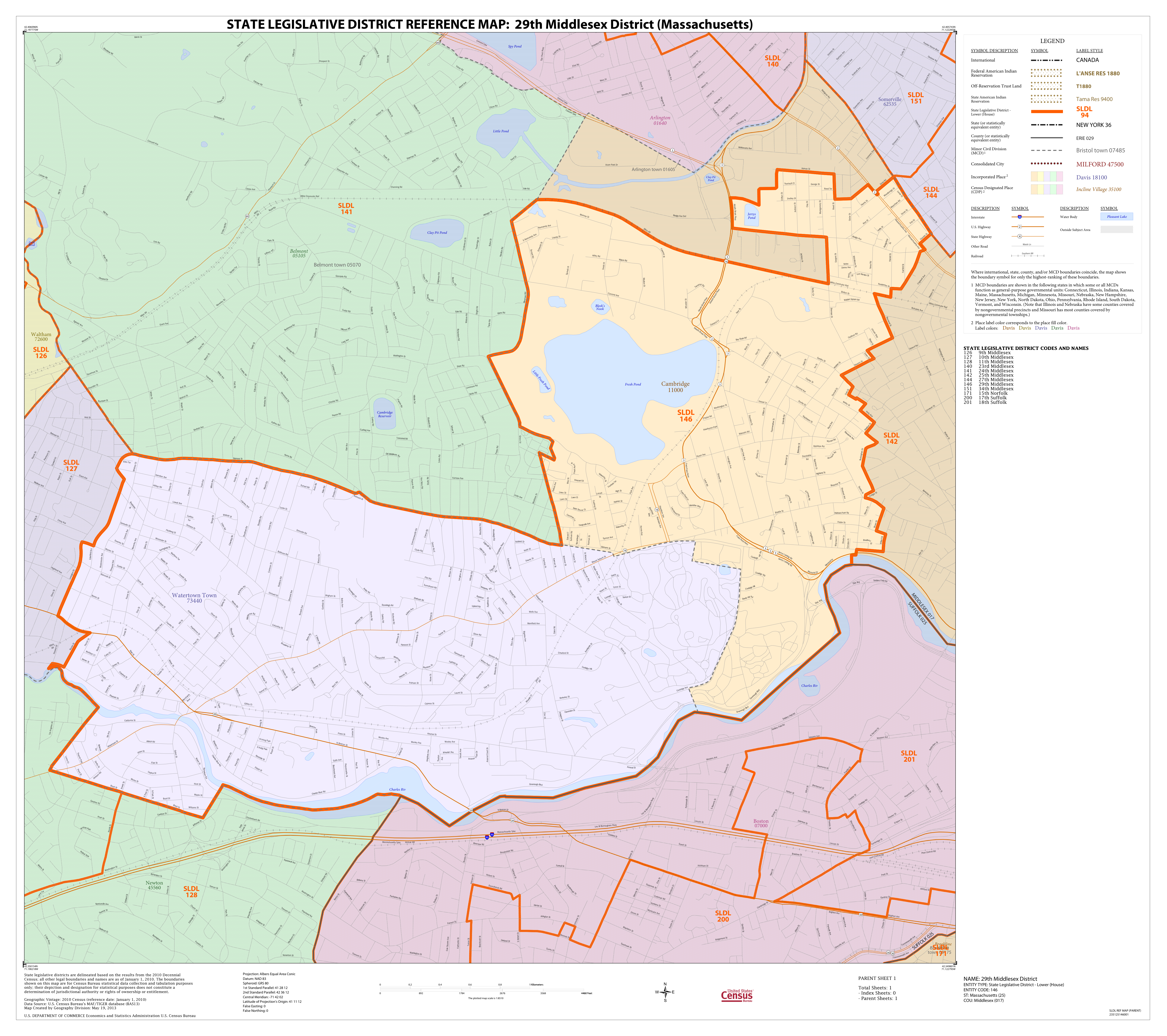
Map of Massachusetts House of Representatives' 29th Middlesex district, based on the 2010 United States census.

Massachusetts House of Representatives' 29th Middlesex district in the United States is one of 160 legislative districts included in the lower house of the Massachusetts General Court. It covers part of Cambridge and part of Watertown in Middlesex County. Since 2021, Steven Owens of the Democratic Party has represented the district.

The current district geographic boundary overlaps with those of the Massachusetts Senate's 2nd Middlesex district and 2nd Suffolk and Middlesex district.

== Previous representatives ==
- Peter A. Vellucci
- Timothy J. Toomey, Jr.
- Rachel Kaprielian
- Jonathan Hecht

== See also ==
- List of Massachusetts House of Representatives elections
- List of Massachusetts General Courts
- Other Middlesex County districts of the Massachusetts House of Representatives: 1st, 2nd, 3rd, 4th, 5th, 6th, 7th, 8th, 9th, 10th, 11th, 12th, 13th, 14th, 15th, 16th, 17th, 18th, 19th, 20th, 21st, 22nd, 23rd, 24th, 25th, 26th, 27th, 28th, 30th, 31st, 32nd, 33rd, 34th, 35th, 36th, 37th
- List of former districts of the Massachusetts House of Representatives

== Images ==
Portraits of legislators

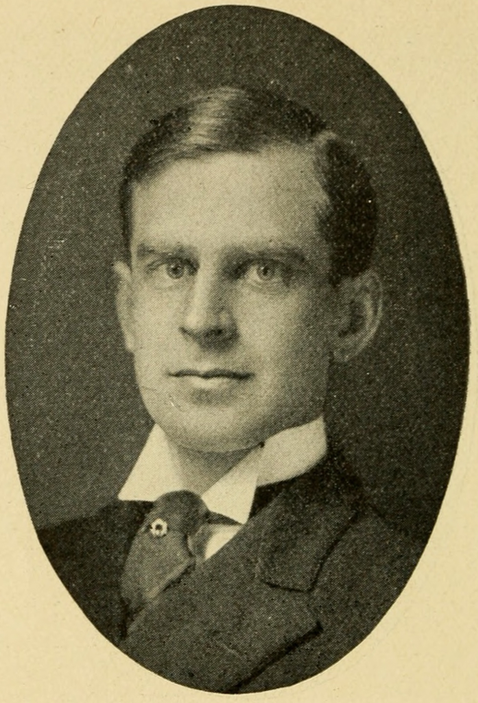
Horace Hardy

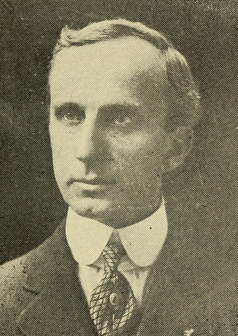
Wesley Monk

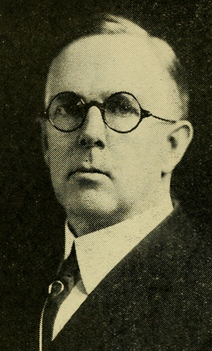
Sarsfield Cunniff

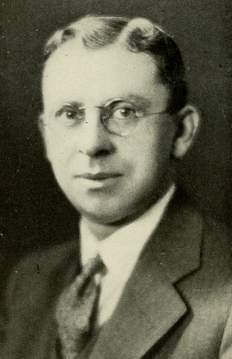
William Ramsdell

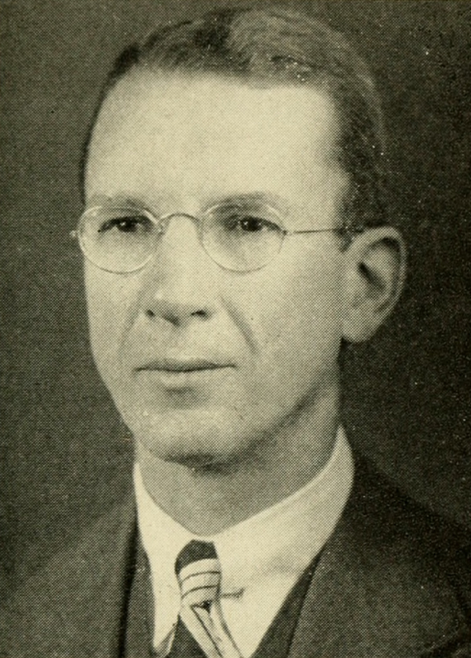
Harrison Chadwick

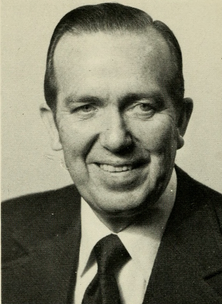
William Shaughnessy

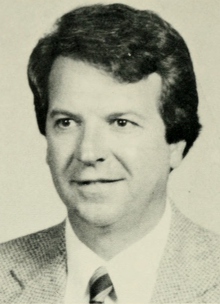
Peter Vellucci

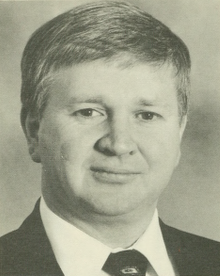
Timothy Toomey

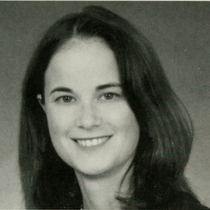
Rachel Kaprielian
