= Massachusetts Executive Office of Labor and Workforce Development =

The Massachusetts Executive Office of Labor and Workforce Development (EOLWD) is a Cabinet level agency under the Governor of Massachusetts. EOLWD is responsible for enforcing the Commonwealth's labor laws and for providing workforce training to citizens. EOLWD is also responsible for administering Massachusetts' workers' compensation laws, enforcing laws governing collective bargaining, and for providing unemployment benefits to those in need.

The agency is under the supervision and control of the Secretary of Labor and Workforce Development, who is appointed by the Governor.

== Leadership ==
The current Secretary of Labor and Workforce Development is Lauren Jones, who was appointed by Governor Maura Healey in January 2023.

== Mission ==
The EOLWD missions is to enhance the quality, diversity and stability of Massachusetts' workforce by making available new opportunities and training, protecting the rights of workers, preventing workplace injuries and illnesses, ensuring that businesses are informed of all employment laws impacting them and their employees, providing temporary assistance when employment is interrupted, promoting labor-management partnerships and ensuring equal access to economic self-sufficiency and opportunity for all citizens of the Commonwealth.

== Constituent departments ==
The Office is composed of several Constituent Departments, which are responsible for the administration of the Office's work. Each Department is headed by a Director, who is appointed by the Governor.

- Office of the Secretary
- Department of Labor Standards
- Department of Industrial Accidents
- Department of Labor Relations
- Department of Career Services
- Department of Unemployment Assistance
- Commonwealth Corporation
- Department of Economic Research

== See also ==
- United States Department of Labor
