= State legislature =

A state legislature is a legislative branch or body of a political subdivision in a federal system.

Two federations literally use the term "state legislature":

- The legislative branches of each of the fifty state governments of the United States are known as state legislatures. Six territorial legislatures also exist.
- The legislative branches of the twenty-eight state governments of India are known as state legislatures. In addition, three union territorial legislatures also exists.

Other federations use other terms for the same concept:

- Australia; the legislative branches of the six states are known as state parliaments. In addition, two territorial parliaments also exist.
- Austria; the legislative branches of the nine states are known as the Landtag.
- Brazil; The legislative branches of the states are known as legislative assemblies.
- Canada; the legislative branches of the ten provinces are known as provincial legislative assemblies. Three territorial legislatures also exist.
- Germany; most of the legislative branches of the sixteen states are known as Landtag.
- Malaysia; the legislative branches of the thirteen states are known as the state assemblies.
- Nigeria; the legislative branches of the 36 states are known as the houses of assembly.
- Russia; the legislative branches of the federal subjects are referred as the regional parliaments.
- Switzerland; the legislative branches of the 26 Cantons are known by several names in each of the four official languages of the country.
