= 2022 Massachusetts gubernatorial election =

- November 8, 2022
- Turnout: 51.4% ▼8.75%
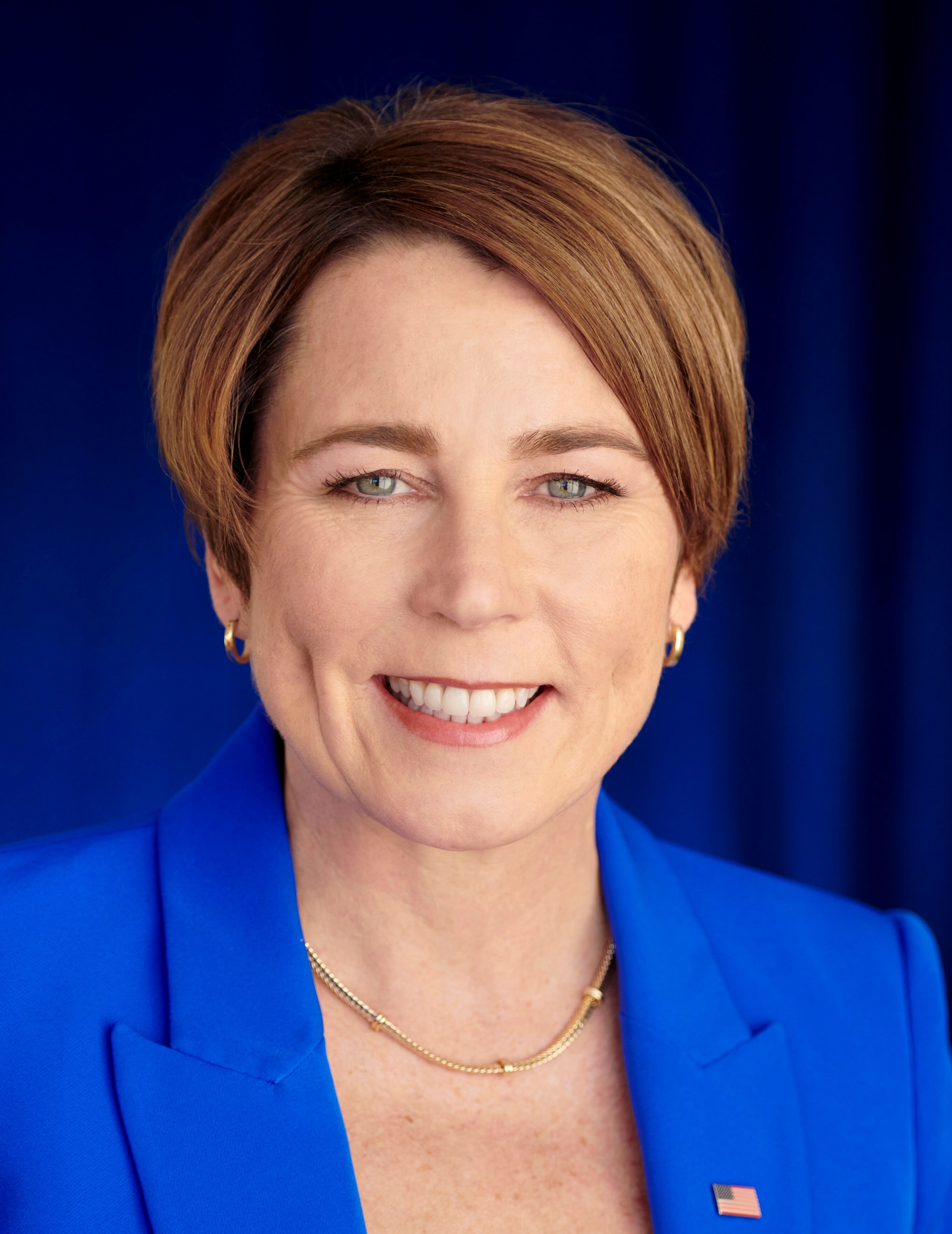

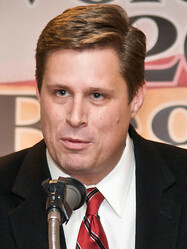
Nominee	Maura Healey	Geoff Diehl
Party	Democratic	Republican
Running mate	Kim Driscoll	Leah Cole Allen
Popular vote	1,584,403	859,343
Percentage	63.74%	34.57%
- Healey: 40–50% 50–60% 60–70% 70–80% 80–90% >90% Diehl: 40–50% 50–60% 60–70% 70–80% Tie: 40–50% No votes
Governor before election
Charlie Baker
Republican
Elected Governor
Maura Healey
Democratic

The 2022 Massachusetts gubernatorial election was held on November 8, 2022, to elect the governor of Massachusetts. Republican former state representative Geoff Diehl, Democratic state Attorney General Maura Healey, and Libertarian Kevin Reed sought to succeed incumbent Governor Charlie Baker, who did not seek re-election after two terms. This was one of six Republican-held governorships up for election in 2022 in a state carried by Joe Biden in the 2020 presidential election, and the only race in which the incumbent was retiring despite being eligible for re-election.

Primary elections were held on September 6, with Diehl and Healey winning against minimal opposition. Due to Massachusetts's strong liberal lean and Diehl's conservative political views, Healey was widely expected to win the election. The election was called for the Democrat shortly after polls closed, with Healey becoming the first woman ever elected governor of Massachusetts (Note: Jane Swift served as acting governor from 2001 to 2003 after Paul Cellucci resigned to become United States Ambassador to Canada) and the first openly lesbian governor to take office. (Note: Tina Kotek, the Governor of Oregon, was concurrently elected in 2022 and is also openly lesbian, but took office after Healey.)

In addition, with the election of Kim Driscoll as lieutenant governor, Massachusetts became one of the first two states to simultaneously elect women as governor and lieutenant governor, along with Arkansas. Arkansas, however, elects the governor in a separate election from the lieutenant governor. Taking 63.7% of the vote, Healey's performance was the strongest of any Democratic gubernatorial candidate in the state since Michael Dukakis in 1986, the best performance in Massachusetts history for a non-incumbent Democrat, and the best performance for any non-incumbent since Channing Cox in 1920. Healey received over 1.5 million votes, the most ever received by a Democratic gubernatorial candidate in Massachusetts.

This election constituted the largest shift by partisan margin of any 2022 gubernatorial election, swinging from a 33.5 point margin of victory for the Republican in 2018 to a 29.1 point margin for the Democrat in 2022. Additionally, every county in the state flipped from Republican to Democratic; this was the first gubernatorial election in which every county flipped since the 2010 Wyoming election.

== Background ==
Despite Republican Charlie Baker winning re-election in 2018, and having consistently elected Republican governors in the state since 1990, with only one Democratic governor being elected in that timeframe, Massachusetts is one of the bluest states in the country. All of the Senate and House seats are Democrat controlled, and Democrats also control supermajorities in both the Massachusetts House of Representatives and the Massachusetts Senate. On December 1, 2021, Baker announced he would not run for re-election, and many polls showed that the Massachusetts governorship was the likeliest to flip in 2022.

== Republican primary ==
=== Governor ===
==== Candidates ====
===== Nominee =====
- Geoff Diehl, former state representative (2011–2019) and nominee for U.S. Senate in 2018 (ran with Leah Cole Allen)

===== Eliminated in primary =====
- Chris Doughty, manufacturing executive (ran with Kate Campanale)

===== Eliminated at convention or did not file =====
- Shiva Ayyadurai, lecturer, entrepreneur and candidate for U.S. Senate in 2018 and 2020
- Darius Mitchell, perennial candidate
- Philip Mitza, ran as a write-in candidate
- Joselito Santiago Matias, tech support specialist

===== Withdrawn =====
- Kimberly Duffy, businesswoman

===== Declined =====
- Charlie Baker, governor of Massachusetts (2015–2023)
- Scott Brown, former U.S. senator from Massachusetts (2010–2013), former U.S. ambassador to New Zealand and Samoa (2017–2020), and nominee for U.S. Senate from New Hampshire in 2014
- Mike Kennealy, secretary of housing and economic development for the Commonwealth of Massachusetts
- Andrew Lelling, former U.S. attorney for the District of Massachusetts (2017–2021)
- Scott Lively, anti-gay activist, independent candidate for governor in 2014 and Republican candidate for governor in 2018
- Shaunna O'Connell, mayor of Taunton (2020–present) and former state representative (2011–2020)
- Patrick O'Connor, state senator (2016–present)
- Karyn Polito, lieutenant governor of Massachusetts (2015–2023)
- Jane Swift, former acting governor (2001–2003) and former lieutenant governor (1999–2003)

==== Endorsements ====
Geoff Diehl

Former federal officials

- Donald Trump, 45th and 47th president of the United States (2017–2021, 2025-present)

Organizations

- Massachusetts Republican Party
Chris Doughty

Governors

- Chris Sununu, governor of New Hampshire (2017–2025)

State legislators

- Shawn Dooley, state representative
Declined to endorse

Governors

- Charlie Baker, governor of Massachusetts (2015–2023)

==== Polling ====
Poll source	Date(s) administered	Sample size (Note: Key: A – all adults RV – registered voters LV – likely voters V – unclear)	Margin of error	Shiva Ayyadurai	Geoff Diehl	Chris Doughty	Other	Undecided
Advantage, Inc. (R) (Note: This poll was sponsored by the Massachusetts Fiscal Alliance, a Republican-aligned group.)	August 22–23, 2022	187 (LV)	± 7.2%	–	42%	27%	–	31%
UMass Amherst	June 15–21, 2022	223 (LV)	± 7.4%	–	55%	18%	1%	26%
Emerson College	May 2–4, 2022	288 (LV)	± 6.5%	6%	37%	9%	7%	41%

Hypothetical polling

Poll source	Date(s) administered	Sample size	Margin of error	Charlie Baker	Geoff Diehl	Karyn Polito	Undecided
Public Policy Polling (D) (Note: This poll was sponsored by the Democratic Governors Association.)	October 12–13, 2021	556 (LV)	± 4.2%	29%	50%	–	21%
Advantage, Inc. (R)	February 22–26, 2021	221 (LV)	± 6.6%	–	20%	22%	58%

Results by municipality: Diehl: 40–50%; 50–60%; 60–70%; 70–80%; 80–90%; Doughty: 50–60%; 60–70%; 70–80%; Tie: 40-50

==== Results ====
Republican primary results
Party	Candidate	Votes	%
Republican	Geoff Diehl	149,800	55.44%
Republican	Chris Doughty	120,418	44.56%
Total votes		270,218	100.0%

=== Lieutenant governor ===
==== Candidates ====
===== Nominee =====
- Leah Cole Allen, former state representative (2013–2015) (ran with Geoff Diehl)

===== Eliminated in primary =====
- Kate Campanale, former state representative (2014–2019) (ran with Chris Doughty)

===== Withdrew =====
- Ron Beaty, former Barnstable County commissioner (2017–2021) (ran for Barnstable County Commission)
- Rayla Campbell, write-in candidate for Massachusetts's 7th congressional district in 2020 (ran for secretary of the Commonwealth)

===== Declined =====
- Cecilia Calabrese, Agawam city councilor (ran for state senate)
- Karyn Polito, lieutenant governor of Massachusetts (2015–2023)

==== Endorsements ====
Leah Cole Allen

Organizations

- Massachusetts Republican Party

==== Debate ====
2022 Massachusetts lieutenant gubernatorial Republican primary debate
No.	Date	Host	Moderator	Link	Republican	Republican
Key: P Participant A Absent N Not invited I Invited W Withdrawn						
Key: P Participant A Absent N Not invited I Invited W Withdrawn					Leah Cole Allen	Kate Campanale
1	Aug. 15, 2022	The Boston Globe; WBUR-FM; WCVB-TV	Steve Brown; Darryl Murphy; Sharman Sacchetti		P	P

==== Polling ====
Poll source	Date(s) administered	Sample size	Margin of error	Leah Cole Allen	Kate Campanale	Undecided
Advantage, Inc. (R)	August 22–23, 2022	187 (LV)	± 7.2%	13%	19%	68%

Results by municipality: Cole Allen: Cole Allen—50–60%; Cole Allen—60–70%; Cole Allen—70–80%; Cole Allen—80–90%; Campanale: Campanale—40–50%; Campanale—50–60%; Campanale—60–70%; Campanale—70–80%; Campanale—80–90%; Campanale—90–100%; Tied

==== Results ====
Republican primary results
Party	Candidate	Votes	%
Republican	Leah Cole Allen	130,962	52.28%
Republican	Kate Campanale	119,516	47.72%
Total votes		250,478	100.0%

== Democratic primary ==
=== Governor ===
==== Candidates ====
===== Nominee =====
- Maura Healey, attorney general of Massachusetts (2015–2023)

===== Withdrawn =====
- Danielle Allen, political science professor at Harvard University (endorsed Healey)
- Sonia Chang-Díaz, state senator (2009–2023) (remained on ballot)
- Scott Donohue, Melrose resident (ran for lieutenant governor)
- Benjamin Downing, former state senator (2007–2017)

===== Declined =====
- Jake Auchincloss, U.S. representative for Massachusetts's 4th congressional district (2021–present) (ran for re-election) (endorsed Healey)
- Michael Bellotti, Norfolk County treasurer (2021–present) and former Norfolk County Sheriff (1999–2018)
- Mo Cowan, former U.S. senator (2013)
- Joseph Curtatone, former mayor of Somerville (2004–2022)
- Michael Dukakis, former governor of Massachusetts (1975–79, 1983–91) and nominee for president in 1988
- Annissa Essaibi George, former at-large Boston city councilor (2016–2022) and candidate for mayor of Boston in 2021
- Deb Goldberg, treasurer and receiver-general of Massachusetts (2015–present) (ran for re-election)
- Jay Gonzalez, former secretary of administration and finance of Massachusetts (2009–2013) and Democratic nominee for governor in 2018
- Paul Heroux, mayor of Attleboro (2018–present) and former state representative (2013–2018) (ran for Bristol County sheriff)
- Joe Kennedy III, former U.S. representative for Massachusetts's 4th congressional district (2013–21) and candidate for U.S. Senate in 2020
- Josh Kraft, CEO of the Kraft Foundation and son of businessman Robert Kraft
- Bob Massie, Episcopal minister, nominee for lieutenant governor in 1994, candidate for U.S. Senate in 2012, and candidate for governor in 2018
- Jon Mitchell, mayor of New Bedford (2011–present)
- Alex Morse, former mayor of Holyoke (2012–2021), current town manager of Provincetown (2021–present), and candidate for Massachusetts's 1st congressional district in 2020
- Tim Murray, former lieutenant governor of Massachusetts (2007–2013)
- Richard Neal, U.S. representative for Massachusetts's 1st congressional district (2013–present), former U.S. representative for Massachusetts's 2nd congressional district (1989–2013) (ran for re-election)
- Ayanna Pressley, U.S. representative for Massachusetts's 7th congressional district (2019–present) (ran for re-election)
- Bob Rivers, chairman and CEO of Eastern Bank
- Marty Walsh, U.S. secretary of labor (2021–2023) and former mayor of Boston (2014–2021)
- Elizabeth Warren, U.S. senator (2013–present) and 2020 Democratic candidate for president

==== Endorsements ====
Sonia Chang-Díaz (withdrawn)

State legislators

- Marcos Devers, state representative
- Jamie Eldridge, state senator
- Nika Elugardo, state representative
- Carmine Gentile, state representative
- Adam Gomez, state senator
- Natalie Higgins, state representative
- Jay R. Kaufman, former state representative
- Mary Keefe, state representative
- Edward J. Kennedy, state senator
- Liz Miranda, state representative
- Rebecca Rausch, state senator
- Maria Robinson, state representative
- Lindsay Sabadosa, state representative
- Danillo Sena, state representative

Local officeholders

- Felix D. Arroyo, Suffolk County register of probate
- Ricardo Arroyo, member of the Boston City Council for the 5th district
- Kendra Lara, member of the Boston City Council
- Julia Mejia, member of the Boston City Council

Individuals

- James Aloisi, former Massachusetts secretary of transportation
- Donald Berwick, former administrator of the Centers for Medicare & Medicaid Services
- Bob Massie, co-founder of Global Reporting Initiative

Organizations

- Neighbor to Neighbor
- People's Action
- Progressive Massachusetts
Maura Healey

U.S. senators

- Elizabeth Warren, U.S. senator for Massachusetts (2013–)

U.S. representatives

- Jake Auchincloss, U.S. representative for Massachusetts's 4th congressional district (2021–)
- Katherine Clark, U.S. representative for Massachusetts's 5th congressional district (2013–)
- Lori Trahan, U.S. representative from Massachusetts's 3rd congressional district (2019–)

State legislators

- Ruth Balser, state representative
- Christine Barber, state representative
- Michael J. Barrett, state representative
- Jamie Belsito, state representative
- Natalie Blais, state representative
- Peter Capano, state representative
- Harriette L. Chandler, state senator
- Michelle Ciccolo, state representative
- Nick Collins, state senator
- Jo Comerford, state senator
- Mike Connolly, state representative
- Brendan Crighton, state senator
- Julian Cyr, state senator
- Marjorie Decker, state representative
- Sal DiDomenico, state senator
- Carol Doherty, state representative
- Mindy Domb, state representative
- Daniel Donahue, state representative
- William Driscoll, state representative
- Lydia Edwards, state senator
- Tricia Farley-Bouvier, state representative
- Paul Feeney, state senator
- Dylan Fernandes, state representative
- Cindy Friedman, state senator
- Sean Garballey, state representative
- Denise Garlick, state representative
- Carlos Gonzalez, state representative
- Ken Gordon, state representative
- Jim Hawkins, state representative
- Kate Hogan, state representative
- Vanna Howard, state representative
- Patrick J. Kearney, state representative
- Kay Khan, state representative
- Jack Lewis, state representative
- Jason Lewis, state senator
- David Linsky, state representative
- Kate Lipper-Garabedian, state representative
- Jay Livingstone, state representative
- Adrian Madaro, state representative
- Liz Malia, state representative
- Ron Mariano, speaker of the Massachusetts House of Representatives
- Joan Meschino, state representative
- Christina Minicucci, state representative
- Tram Nguyen, state representative
- Jake Oliveira, state representative
- Sarah Peake, state representative
- Alice Peisch, state representative
- Dave Rogers, state representative
- Jon Santiago, state representative
- Adam Scanlon, state representative
- Karen Spilka, president of the Massachusetts Senate
- Chynah Tyler, state representative
- Steven Ultrino, state representative
- Andy Vargas, state representative
- Tommy Vitolo, state representative

Mayors

- Kim Driscoll, mayor of Salem and candidate for lieutenant governor in this election
- Michelle Wu, mayor of Boston

Individuals

- Danielle Allen, Harvard professor
- Barbara F. Lee, philanthropist

Organizations

- Democratic Governors Association
- EMILY's List
- Giffords PAC
- Human Rights Campaign
- Massachusetts Democratic Party
- NARAL Pro-Choice America
- Planned Parenthood Advocacy Fund of Massachusetts

Unions

- American Federation of Teachers Massachusetts
- International Brotherhood of Electrical Workers Local 103
- Massachusetts AFL–CIO
- Massachusetts Nurses Association
- Service Employees International Union Massachusetts State Council
- Teamsters Local 25
- United Auto Workers Region 9A

==== Polling ====
Source of poll aggregation	Dates administered	Dates updated	Sonia Chang-Díaz	Maura Healey	Other (Note: Calculated by taking the difference of 100% and all other candidates combined.)	Margin
Real Clear Politics	April 2 – May 4, 2022	May 7, 2022	12.5%	48.0%	39.5%	Healey +35.5

Poll source	Date(s) administered	Sample size	Margin of error	Sonia Chang-Díaz	Maura Healey	Other	Undecided
UMass Amherst	August 26–29, 2022	500 (LV)	± 5.1%	14%	73%	1%	12%
UMass Amherst	June 15–21, 2022	557 (LV)	± 4.7%	20%	53%	1%	26%
Emerson College	May 2–4, 2022	488 (LV)	± 4.6%	8%	34%	15% (Note: "Someone else" with 12%, Silva with 2%, Caldwell with 1%)	43%
UMass Lowell	April 2–11, 2022	800 (LV)	± 3.9%	17%	62%	2%	18%
MassINC Polling Group (D) (Note: This poll was sponsored by Priorities for Progress, a Democratic-aligned group.)	January 18–20, 2022	310 (LV)	± 5.6%	12%	48%	7% (Note: "Some other candidate" with 4%, Allen with 3%)	30%

Hypothetical polling

Poll source	Date(s) administered	Sample size	Margin of error	Danielle Allen	Charlie Baker (Note: As a candidate changing parties to run in the Democratic primary)	Sonia Chang-Díaz	Ben Downing	Deb Goldberg	Maura Healey	Joe Kennedy III	Ayanna Pressley	Marty Walsh	Other	Undecided
MassINC Polling Group (D)	January 18–20, 2022	310 (LV)	± 5.6%	2%	–	8%	–	–	31%	–	–	32%	2%	22%
Advantage, Inc. (R)	February 22–26, 2021	406 (LV)	± 4.9%	2%	–	–	2%	–	35%	22%	–	–	–	39%
SurveyUSA (D)	August 12–16, 2020	558 (LV)	± 4.1%	–	–	–	–	3%	25%	–	13%	25%	–	34%
SurveyUSA (D)	August 12–16, 2020	558 (LV)	± 4.1%	–	62%	–	–	1%	13%	–	7%	4%	–	13%
Suffolk University	June 5–9, 2019	600 (LV)	± 4.0%	–	–	–	–	–	34%	–	–	36%	–	30%

==== Results ====
===== Convention =====
Democratic convention vote, June 4
Party	Candidate	Votes	%
Democratic	Maura Healey	2,858	71.2%
Democratic	Sonia Chang-Díaz	1,155	28.8%
Total votes		4,013	100.0%

===== Primary =====
Results by municipality: Healey: 50–60%; 60–70%; 70–80%; 80–90%; 90–100%

Democratic primary, September 6
Party	Candidate	Votes	%
Democratic	Maura Healey	642,092	85.54%
Democratic	Sonia Chang-Díaz (withdrawn)	108,574	14.46%
Total votes		750,666	100.0%

=== Lieutenant governor ===
==== Nominee ====
- Kim Driscoll, mayor of Salem

===== Eliminated in primary =====
- Tami Gouveia, state representative
- Eric Lesser, state senator

===== Eliminated at convention or did not file =====
- Bret Bero, Babson College lecturer and small business owner (endorsed Lesser)
- Scott Donohue, Melrose resident
- Adam G. Hinds, state senator

===== Declined =====
- Manny Cruz, member of the Salem school committee
- Angel Donahue-Rodriguez, deputy chief of staff to Massachusetts Bay Transportation Authority
- Dan Koh, chief of staff to U.S. Labor Secretary Marty Walsh, former Andover selectman, and candidate for Massachusetts' 3rd congressional district in 2018

==== Endorsements ====
Kim Driscoll

Federal officials

- Bill Delahunt, former U.S. representative for Massachusetts's 10th congressional district (1997–2011)

State officials

- Thomas P. O'Neill III, former lieutenant governor of Massachusetts (1975–1983)

State legislators

- James Arciero, state representative
- Bruce Ayers, state representative
- Christine Barber, state representative
- Jamie Belsito, state representative
- David Biele, state representative
- Natalie Blais, state representative (previously endorsed Hinds)
- Linda Dean Campbell, state representative
- Gerard Cassidy, state representative
- Peter Capano, state representative
- Tackey Chan, state representative
- Robert Consalvo, state representative
- Mark Cusack, state representative
- Michael S. Day, state representative
- Marjorie Decker, state representative
- Bob DeLeo, former state representative
- Kip Diggs, state representative
- Dan Donahue, state representative
- Paul Donato, state representative
- Bill Driscoll Jr., state representative
- Dylan Fernandes, state representative
- Ann-Margaret Ferrante, state representative
- Michael Finn, state representative
- Carole Fiola, state representative
- Denise Garlick, state representative
- Jessica Giannino, state representative
- Patricia Haddad, state representative
- Richard Haggerty, state representative
- Kate Hogan, president pro tempore of the Massachusetts House of Representatives
- Daniel J. Hunt, state representative
- Mary Keefe, state representative
- John F. Keenan, state senator
- Jack Patrick Lewis, state representative
- Kate Lipper-Garabedian, state representative
- Jay Livingstone, state representative
- Adrian Madaro, state representative
- John J. Mahoney, state representative
- Ron Mariano, speaker of the Massachusetts House of Representatives
- Christopher Markey, state representative
- Paul McMurtry, state representative
- Joan Meschino, state representative
- Christina Minicucci, state representative
- Mike Moran, state representative
- James M. Murphy, state representative
- Jim O'Day, state representative
- Jerry Parisella, state representative
- Sarah Peake, state representative
- Alice Peisch, state representative
- John H. Rogers, state representative
- Dan Ryan, state representative
- Jon Santiago, state representative
- Alan Silvia, state representative
- Thomas M. Stanley, state representative
- William M. Straus, state representative (previously endorsed Hinds)
- Tom Walsh, state representative
- Jonathan Zlotnik, state representative

Local officials

- Kenzie Bok, member of the Boston City Council
- Gary Christenson, mayor of Malden
- Yvonne M. Spicer, former mayor of Framingham (2018–2022)
- Steve Tompkins, sheriff of Suffolk County

Individuals

- Jay Gonzalez, former secretary of administration and finance of Massachusetts (2009–2013), Democratic nominee for governor in 2018
- Barbara F. Lee, philanthropist
- Shannon O'Brien, former treasurer and receiver-general of Massachusetts (1999–2003)

Labor unions

- International Brotherhood of Electrical Workers Local 103
- LIUNA Local 175

Organizations

- EMILY's List
- Massachusetts Democratic Party
- Planned Parenthood Advocacy Fund of Massachusetts
- United Steelworkers District 4
Tami Gouveia

State legislators

- Carol Doherty, state representative
- Michelle DuBois, state representative
- Jamie Eldridge, state senator
- Nika Elugardo, state representative
- Carmine Gentile, state representative
- Jim Hawkins, state representative
- Natalie Higgins, state representative
- Russell Holmes, state representative
- Patrick J. Kearney, state representative
- Dan Sena, state representative

Local officials

- Julia Mejia, Boston city councillor

Individuals

- Bob Massie, activist and Democratic nominee for lieutenant governor in 1994

Organizations

- Our Revolution Massachusetts
Adam Hinds (eliminated)

State legislators

- John Barrett, state representative
- ~~Natalie Blais, state representative~~ (switched endorsement to Driscoll after Hinds was eliminated)
- ~~Jo Comerford, state senator~~ (switched endorsement to Lesser after Hinds was eliminated)
- Brendan Crighton, state senator
- ~~Julian Cyr, state senator~~ (switched endorsement to Lesser after Hinds was eliminated)
- Mindy Domb, state representative
- ~~Anne Gobi, state senator~~ (switched endorsement to Lesser after Hinds was eliminated)
- ~~Adam Gomez, state senator~~ (switched endorsement to Lesser after Hinds was eliminated)
- Stephen Kulik, former state representative
- ~~Jacob Oliveira, state representative~~ (switched endorsement to Lesser after Hinds was eliminated)
- ~~Smitty Pignatelli, state representative~~ (switched endorsement to Lesser after Hinds was eliminated)
- ~~Mike Rush, state senator~~ (switched endorsement to Lesser after Hinds was eliminated)
- ~~Lindsay Sabadosa, state representative~~ (switched endorsement to Lesser after Hinds was eliminated)
- ~~William M. Straus, state representative~~ (switched endorsement to Driscoll after Hinds was eliminated)

Local officials

- Thomas Bernard, former mayor of North Adams
- Patrick J. Callihane, sheriff of Hampshire County
- Christopher Donelan, sheriff of Franklin County
- ~~Nicole LaChapelle, mayor of Easthampton~~ (switched endorsement to Driscoll after Hinds was eliminated)
- ~~David Narkewicz, former mayor of Northampton~~ (switched endorsement to Driscoll after Hinds was eliminated)
- ~~David Sullivan, district attorney for the northwestern district of Massachusetts~~ (switched endorsement to Lesser after Hinds was eliminated)
- ~~Linda Tyer, mayor of Pittsfield~~ (switched endorsement to Driscoll after Hinds was eliminated)
- ~~Roxann Wedegartner, mayor of Greenfield~~ (switched endorsement to Driscoll after Hinds was eliminated)

Labor unions

- IUE-CWA
Eric Lesser

Federal officials

- David Axelrod, former senior advisor to the president of the United States (2009–2011), chief strategist for Barack Obama's 2008 and 2012 presidential campaigns
- Richard Neal, U.S. representative for Massachusetts's 1st congressional district

State officials

- Steve Grossman, former treasurer and receiver-general of Massachusetts (2011–2015), former chair of the Massachusetts Democratic Party (1991–1993)

State legislators

- Brian Ashe, state representative
- Will Brownsberger, state senator and president pro tempore of the Massachusetts Senate
- Antonio Cabral, state representative
- Dan Carey, state representative
- Harriette Chandler, former state senator and president of the Massachusetts Senate
- Nick Collins, state senator
- Jo Comerford, state senator (previously endorsed Hinds)
- Cindy Creem, state senator and majority leader
- John Cronin, state senator
- Julian Cyr, state senator (previously endorsed Hinds)
- Marcos Devers, state representative
- Paul Feeney, state senator
- Barry Finegold, state senator
- Cindy Friedman, state senator
- Anne Gobi, state senator (previously endorsed Hinds)
- Adam Gomez, state senator (previously endorsed Hinds)
- Carlos González, state representative
- Daniel F. Keenan, former state representative
- Edward J. Kennedy, state senator
- Kay Khan, state representative
- Mike Kushmerek, state representative
- Paul Mark, state representative
- Linda Melconian, former state senator and majority leader
- Michael O. Moore, state senator
- Richard T. Moore, former state senator and president pro tempore of the Massachusetts State Senate
- Frank Moran, state representative
- Susan Moran, state senator
- Brian Murray, state representative
- Kathleen O'Connor Ives, former state senator
- Jacob Oliveira, state representative (previously endorsed Hinds)
- Ted Phillips, state representative
- Smitty Pignatelli, state representative (previously endorsed Hinds)
- Lois Pines, former state senator
- Orlando Ramos, state representative
- Michael Rodrigues, state senator
- Jeffrey Roy, state representative
- Mike Rush, state senator (previously endorsed Hinds)
- Lindsay Sabadosa, state representative (previously endorsed Hinds)
- Adam Scanlon, state representative
- Karen Spilka, president of the Massachusetts Senate
- Jose Tosado, former state representative
- John Velis, state senator
- Tommy Vitolo, state representative
- Bud Williams, state representative

Local officials

- Patrick J. Cahillane, sheriff of Hampshire County
- Nicholas Cocchi, sheriff of Hampden County
- Vicki Danberg, Newton city councilor
- Victor Davila, Springfield city councilor
- Brian DePeña, mayor of Lawrence
- Salem Derby, Easthampton city councilor
- Cathleen DeSimone, Attleboro city councilor
- Stephen DiNatale, mayor of Fitchburg
- Zaida Govan, Springfield city councilor
- Justin Hurst, Springfield city councilor
- Wayne Jenness, Lowell city councilor
- Josh Krintzman, Newton city councilor
- Frank Laflamme, Chicopee city councilor
- Richard Lipof, Newton city councilor
- Joel McAuliffe, Chicopee city councilor
- Candy Mero-Carlson, Worcester city councilor
- Sean Rose, Worcester city councilor
- Anthony Russo, Agawam city councilor
- Domenic Sarno, mayor of Springfield
- Charles Sisitsky, mayor of Framingham
- David Sullivan, district attorney for the northwestern district of Massachusetts (previously endorsed Hinds)
- John L. Vieau, mayor of Chicopee
- Ty Waterman, Attleboro city councilor
- Tracye Whitfield, Springfield city councilor
- Jake Wilson, Somerville city councilor
- Owen Zaret, Easthampton city councilor

Individuals

- Mary Hurley, member of the Governor's Council and first female mayor of Springfield
- Phil Johnston, former chair of the Massachusetts Democratic Party
- Robert Markel, former mayor of Springfield

Labor unions

- American Federation of State, County and Municipal Employees Council 93
- International Brotherhood of Electrical Workers Local 2324
- United Food and Commercial Workers Local 1459

Newspapers

- Springfield Republican

==== Debate ====
2022 Massachusetts lieutenant gubernatorial Democratic primary debate
No.	Date	Host	Moderator	Link	Democratic	Democratic	Democratic
Key: P Participant A Absent N Not invited I Invited W Withdrawn							
Key: P Participant A Absent N Not invited I Invited W Withdrawn					Kim Driscoll	Tami Gouveia	Eric Lesser
1	Aug. 16, 2022	The Boston Globe; WBUR-FM; WCVB-TV	Steve Brown; Taylor Dolven; Sharman Sacchetti		P	P	P

==== Polling ====
Poll source	Date(s) administered	Sample size	Margin of error	Kim Driscoll	Tami Gouveia	Adam Hinds	Eric Lesser	Other	Undecided
UMass Amherst	August 26–29, 2022	500 (LV)	± 5.1%	31%	15%	–	17%	1%	37%
UMass Lowell	August 16–25, 2022	800 (LV)	± 3.9%	33%	13%	–	23%	2%	30%
Advantage, Inc. (R)	August 22–23, 2022	563 (LV)	± 4.1%	13%	6%	–	9%	–	72%
MassINC Polling Group (D)	August 19–21, 2022	401 (LV)	± 4.9%	21%	7%	–	14%	5%	50%
MassINC Polling Group	August 5–9, 2022	520 (LV)	± 5.1%	15%	8%	–	7%	6%	62%
UMass Amherst	June 15–21, 2022	556 (LV)	± 4.7%	17%	10%	–	12%	0%	61%
MassINC Polling Group (D)	June 2022	– (LV)	–	16%	6%	–	10%	5%	58%
UMass Lowell	April 2–11, 2022	800 (LV)	± 3.9%	22%	9%	7%	10%	2%	49%
MassINC Polling Group (D)	January 18–20, 2022	310 (LV)	± 5.6%	10%	5%	5%	5%	4%	64%

Results by municipality: Driscoll: Driscoll—30–40%; Driscoll—40–50%; Driscoll—50–60%; Driscoll—60–70%; Driscoll—70–80%; Driscoll—80–90%; Lesser: Lesser—30–40%; Lesser—40–50%; Lesser—50–60%; Lesser—60–70%; Lesser—70–80%; Lesser—80–90%; Lesser—90–100%; Gouveia: Gouveia—30–40%; Gouveia—40–50%; Gouveia—50–60%; Gouveia—60–70%

==== Results ====
===== Convention =====
Democratic convention vote, June 4
Party	Candidate	Votes	%
Democratic	Kim Driscoll	1,641	41.4%
Democratic	Tami Gouveia	911	23.0%
Democratic	Eric Lesser	839	21.2%
Democratic	Adam Hinds	493	12.2%
Democratic	Bret Bero	81	2.0%
Total votes		3,965	100.0%

===== Primary =====
Democratic primary, September 6
Party	Candidate	Votes	%
Democratic	Kim Driscoll	332,712	46.65%
Democratic	Eric Lesser	233,241	32.71%
Democratic	Tami Gouveia	147,224	20.64%
Total votes		713,177	100.0%

== Libertarian primary ==
=== Governor ===
==== Candidates ====
===== Nominee =====
- Kevin Reed

==== Withdrew ====
- Carlos Perez

=== Lieutenant governor ===
==== Candidates ====
===== Nominee =====
- Peter Everett

== Independents ==
=== Candidates ===
==== Failed to qualify for ballot ====
- Dianna Ploss, former radio host

== General election ==
=== Post-primary endorsements ===
Geoff Diehl (R)

Governors

- Kristi Noem, governor of South Dakota (2019–2025)

State officials

- Joe Malone, treasurer and receiver-general of Massachusetts (1991–1999) (Independent, in office as a Republican)
- Francisco Urena, Massachusetts secretary of Veterans' Services (2015–2020)

State legislators

- Marc Lombardo, state representative (2011–present)
- Dean Tran, former state senator (2017–2021) and Republican nominee for Massachusetts's 3rd congressional district in 2022
- Daniel Winslow, former state representative (2011–2013)

Organizations

- Massachusetts Citizens for Life

Individuals

- James J. Lyons Jr., chair of the Massachusetts Republican Party (2019-2023)
- Lenny Clarke, comedian and actor
- Dean Cain, actor
- Greg Hill, radio personality
- Corey Lewandowski, political strategist
- Matt Light, former NFL player
- Jay McMahon, Republican nominee for Massachusetts Attorney General in 2018 and 2022
- Glenn Ordway, radio personality
- Jim Rappaport, chair of the Massachusetts Republican Party (1992–1997) and Republican nominee for the U.S. Senate in 1990
- Fred Smerlas, former NFL player
Maura Healey (D)

Federal officials

- Kamala Harris, vice president of the United States (2021–2025)

U.S. senators

- Ed Markey, U.S. senator for Massachusetts (2013–present)

U.S. representatives

- Bill Keating, U.S. representative for Massachusetts's 9th congressional district (2013–present)
- Stephen F. Lynch, U.S. representative for Massachusetts's 8th congressional district (2013–present)
- Jim McGovern, U.S. representative for Massachusetts's 2nd congressional district (2013–present)
- Richard Neal, U.S. representative for Massachusetts's 1st congressional district (2013–present)
- Ayanna Pressley, U.S. representative for Massachusetts's 7th congressional district (2019–present)

State officials

- Deb Goldberg, treasurer and receiver-general of Massachusetts (2015–present)

State legislators

- Eric Lesser, state senator and candidate for lieutenant governor in 2022

Mayors

- Jon Mitchell, mayor of New Bedford

Individuals

- Danielle Allen, Harvard professor
- Barbara F. Lee, philanthropist

Organizations

- Environmental League of Massachusetts
- Everytown for Gun Safety
- Feminist Majority PAC
- LGBTQ Victory Fund
- One Fair Wage Action
- Reproductive Equity Now

Unions

- National Education Association

Newspapers

- The Berkshire Eagle
- The Boston Globe
- The Republican
- The Sun
Declined to endorse

State officials

- Charlie Baker, governor of Massachusetts (2015–2023) (Republican)

=== Predictions ===
Source	Ranking	As of
The Cook Political Report	Solid D (flip)	July 20, 2022
Inside Elections	Solid D (flip)	September 9, 2022
Sabato's Crystal Ball	Safe D (flip)	September 7, 2022
Politico	Solid D (flip)	April 1, 2022
RCP	Safe D (flip)	July 13, 2022
Fox News	Solid D (flip)	August 22, 2022
538	Solid D (flip)	July 31, 2022
Elections Daily	Safe D (flip)	November 7, 2022

=== Polling ===
Aggregate polls

Source of poll aggregation	Dates administered	Dates updated	Geoff Diehl (R)	Maura Healey (D)	Other (Note: Calculated by taking the difference of 100% and all other candidates combined.)	Margin
Real Clear Politics	September 7 – October 16, 2022	October 18, 2022	33.5%	54.0%	12.5%	Healey +20.5
FiveThirtyEight	May 4 – October 19, 2022	October 20, 2022	28.5%	54.6%	16.9%	Healey +26.1
Average			31.0%	54.3%	14.7%	Healey +23.3

View source data.

Poll source	Date(s) administered	Sample size	Margin of error	Geoff Diehl (R)	Maura Healey (D)	Other	Undecided
UMass Amherst/YouGov	October 20–26, 2022	700 (RV)	± 4.3%	33%	61%	2% (Note: Reed (L) with 2%)	3%
UMass Lowell/YouGov	October 18–25, 2022	1,000 (LV)	± 4.1%	32%	59%	3% (Note: Reed (L) with 3%)	6%
Suffolk University	October 13–16, 2022	500 (LV)	± 4.4%	33%	56%	4% (Note: Reed (L) with 4%)	6%
MassINC Polling Group	October 5–14, 2022	987 (LV)	–	23%	53%	6% (Note: "Some other candidate" with 4%; "Would not vote" with 2%; "Refused" with <1%)	18%
Suffolk University	September 10–13, 2022	500 (RV)	± 4.4%	26%	52%	6% (Note: Reed (L) with 5%, "Refused" with 1%)	17%
Emerson College	September 7–8, 2022	708 (LV)	± 3.6%	34%	52%	3% (Note: "Someone else" with 3%)	12%
Suffolk University	July 20–23, 2022	493 (LV)	± 4.4%	23%	54%	–	23%
UMass Lowell	June 7–15, 2022	1,000 (LV)	± 4.0%	30%	61%	1%	8%
Emerson College	May 2–4, 2022	848 (RV)	± 3.3%	31%	59%	–	10%
Suffolk University	April 24–28, 2022	651 (LV)	± 3.8%	27%	54%	–	19%

Hypothetical polling

Charlie Baker vs. Danielle Allen

Poll source	Date(s) administered	Sample size	Margin of error	Charlie Baker (R)	Danielle Allen (D)	Other	Undecided
YouGov/UMass Amherst (Note: Candidates were listed without party affiliation, leading to a large number of respondents selecting neither candidate)	November 9–16, 2021	750 (A)	± 4.1%	33%	12%	6% (Note: "Would Not Vote" with 6%)	48%
YouGov/UMass Amherst	November 9–16, 2021	687 (RV)	± 4.3%	34%	12%	5% (Note: "Would Not Vote" with 5%)	48%
YouGov/UMass Amherst	March 5–9, 2021	800 (A)	± 4.6%	30%	14%	8% (Note: "Would Not Vote" with 8%)	48%
YouGov/UMass Amherst	March 5–9, 2021	756 (RV)	± 4.7%	31%	14%	6%	49%

Charlie Baker vs. Sonia Chang-Díaz

Poll source	Date(s) administered	Sample size	Margin of error	Charlie Baker (R)	Sonia Chang-Díaz (D)	Other	Undecided
YouGov/UMass Amherst	November 9–16, 2021	750 (A)	± 4.1%	35%	16%	9% (Note: "Would Not Vote" with 9%)	41%
YouGov/UMass Amherst	November 9–16, 2021	687 (RV)	± 4.3%	36%	16%	7% (Note: "Would Not Vote" with 7%)	41%
YouGov/UMass Amherst	March 5–9, 2021	800 (A)	± 4.6%	30%	16%	10% (Note: "Would Not Vote" with 10%)	45%
YouGov/UMass Amherst	March 5–9, 2021	756 (RV)	± 4.7%	31%	17%	7%	45%

Charlie Baker vs. Benjamin Downing

Poll source	Date(s) administered	Sample size	Margin of error	Charlie Baker (R)	Benjamin Downing (D)	Other	Undecided
YouGov/UMass Amherst	November 9–16, 2021	750 (A)	± 4.1%	35%	11%	8%	46%
YouGov/UMass Amherst	November 9–16, 2021	687 (RV)	± 4.3%	36%	11%	6%	47%
YouGov/UMass Amherst	March 5–9, 2021	800 (A)	± 4.6%	30%	11%	8%	51%
YouGov/UMass Amherst	March 5–9, 2021	756 (RV)	± 4.7%	31%	12%	6%	51%

Charlie Baker vs. Maura Healey

Poll source	Date(s) administered	Sample size	Margin of error	Charlie Baker (R)	Maura Healey (D)	Other	Undecided
Change Research/Northwind Strategies (D)	November 15–19, 2021	789 (LV)	± 4.1%	33%	29%	–	38%
YouGov/UMass Amherst	November 9–16, 2021	750 (A)	± 4.1%	33%	27%	11% (Note: "Would Not Vote" with 11%)	30%
YouGov/UMass Amherst	November 9–16, 2021	687 (RV)	± 4.3%	34%	28%	9%	29%
YouGov/UMass Amherst	March 5–9, 2021	800 (A)	± 4.6%	30%	27%	10%	34%
YouGov/UMass Amherst	March 5–9, 2021	756 (RV)	± 4.7%	31%	28%	7%	34%

Charlie Baker vs. Joe Kennedy III

Poll source	Date(s) administered	Sample size	Margin of error	Charlie Baker (R)	Joe Kennedy III (D)	Other	Undecided
Change Research/Northwind Strategies (D)	November 15–19, 2021	789 (LV)	± 4.1%	36%	30%	–	34%
YouGov/UMass Amherst	March 5–9, 2021	800 (A)	± 4.6%	35%	25%	10%	30%
YouGov/UMass Amherst	March 5–9, 2021	756 (RV)	± 4.7%	37%	27%	8%	28%

Charlie Baker vs. Orlando Silva

Poll source	Date(s) administered	Sample size	Margin of error	Charlie Baker (R)	Orlando Silva (D)	Other	Undecided
YouGov/UMass Amherst	November 9–16, 2021	750 (A)	± 4.1%	36%	9%	8%	47%
YouGov/UMass Amherst	November 9–16, 2021	687 (RV)	± 4.3%	37%	9%	7%	47%

Karyn Polito vs. Danielle Allen

Poll source	Date(s) administered	Sample size	Margin of error	Karyn Polito (R)	Danielle Allen (D)	Other	Undecided
YouGov/UMass Amherst	November 9–16, 2021	750 (A)	± 4.1%	21%	17%	8%	54%
YouGov/UMass Amherst	November 9–16, 2021	687 (RV)	± 4.3%	22%	17%	7%	54%

Karyn Polito vs. Sonia Chang-Díaz

Poll source	Date(s) administered	Sample size	Margin of error	Karyn Polito (R)	Sonia Chang-Díaz (D)	Other	Undecided
YouGov/UMass Amherst	November 9–16, 2021	750 (A)	± 4.1%	21%	19%	8%	51%
YouGov/UMass Amherst	November 9–16, 2021	687 (RV)	± 4.3%	23%	19%	7%	52%

Karyn Polito vs. Benjamin Downing

Poll source	Date(s) administered	Sample size	Margin of error	Karyn Polito (R)	Benjamin Downing (D)	Other	Undecided
YouGov/UMass Amherst	November 9–16, 2021	750 (A)	± 4.1%	21%	15%	8%	56%
YouGov/UMass Amherst	November 9–16, 2021	687 (RV)	± 4.3%	22%	16%	7%	55%

Karyn Polito vs. Maura Healey

Poll source	Date(s) administered	Sample size	Margin of error	Karyn Polito (R)	Maura Healey (D)	Other	Undecided
Change Research/Northwind Strategies (D)	November 15–19, 2021	789 (LV)	± 4.1%	21%	42%	–	37%
YouGov/UMass Amherst	November 9–16, 2021	750 (A)	± 4.1%	18%	32%	10%	40%
YouGov/UMass Amherst	November 9–16, 2021	687 (RV)	± 4.3%	19%	35%	8%	38%

Karyn Polito vs. Orlando Silva

Poll source	Date(s) administered	Sample size	Margin of error	Karyn Polito (R)	Orlando Silva (D)	Other	Undecided
YouGov/UMass Amherst	November 9–16, 2021	750 (A)	± 4.1%	21%	14%	9%	57%
YouGov/UMass Amherst	November 9–16, 2021	687 (RV)	± 4.3%	22%	14%	7%	56%

Geoff Diehl vs. Maura Healey with Charlie Baker as an independent

Poll source	Date(s) administered	Sample size	Margin of error	Geoff Diehl (R)	Maura Healey (D)	Charlie Baker (I)	Undecided
Suffolk University	April 24–28, 2022	651 (LV)	± 3.8%	17%	28%	37%	18%
Change Research/Northwind Strategies (D)	November 15–19, 2021	789 (LV)	± 4.1%	21%	26%	32%	21%

Geoff Diehl vs. Sonia Chang-Díaz
Aggregate polls

Source of poll aggregation	Dates administered	Dates updated	Geoff Diehl (R)	Sonia Chang-Díaz (D)	Other (Note: Calculated by taking the difference of 100% and all other candidates combined.)	Margin
Real Clear Politics	April 24 – June 15, 2022	June 22, 2022	30.0%	48.7%	21.3%	Chang-Díaz +15.5

Poll source	Date(s) administered	Sample size	Margin of error	Geoff Diehl (R)	Sonia Chang-Díaz (D)	Other	Undecided
UMass Lowell	June 7–15, 2022	1,000 (LV)	± 4.0%	29%	54%	3%	15%
Emerson College	May 2–4, 2022	848 (RV)	± 3.3%	32%	47%	–	21%
Suffolk University	April 24–28, 2022	651 (LV)	± 3.8%	29%	45%	–	25%

Chris Doughty vs. Sonia Chang-Díaz
Aggregate polls

Source of poll aggregation	Dates administered	Dates updated	Chris Doughty (R)	Sonia Chang-Díaz (D)	Other (Note: Calculated by taking the difference of 100% and all other candidates combined.)	Margin
Real Clear Politics	April 24 – June 15, 2022	June 22, 2022	30.0%	44.7%	25.3%	Chang-Díaz +14.7

Poll source	Date(s) administered	Sample size	Margin of error	Chris Doughty (R)	Sonia Chang-Díaz (D)	Other	Undecided
UMass Lowell	June 7–15, 2022	1,000 (LV)	± 4.0%	30%	50%	4%	16%
Emerson College	May 2–4, 2022	848 (RV)	± 3.3%	33%	41%	–	26%
Suffolk University	April 24–28, 2022	651 (LV)	± 3.8%	27%	43%	–	30%

Chris Doughty vs. Maura Healey
Aggregate polls

Source of poll aggregation	Dates administered	Dates updated	Chris Doughty (R)	Maura Healey (D)	Other (Note: Calculated by taking the difference of 100% and all other candidates combined.)	Margin
Real Clear Politics	April 24 – June 15, 2022	June 22, 2022	28.7%	55.7%	15.6%	Healey +27.0

Poll source	Date(s) administered	Sample size	Margin of error	Chris Doughty (R)	Maura Healey (D)	Other	Undecided
Suffolk University	July 20–23, 2022	493 (LV)	± 4.4%	22%	54%	–	24%
UMass Lowell	June 7–15, 2022	1,000 (LV)	± 4.0%	30%	58%	2%	10%
Emerson College	May 2–4, 2022	848 (RV)	± 3.3%	31%	54%	–	15%
Suffolk University	April 24–28, 2022	651 (LV)	± 3.8%	25%	55%	–	21%

=== Debates ===
2022 Massachusetts gubernatorial general election debates
No.	Date	Host	Moderators	Link	Republican	Democratic
Key: P Participant A Absent N Non-invitee I Invitee W Withdrawn						
Key: P Participant A Absent N Non-invitee I Invitee W Withdrawn					Geoff Diehl	Maura Healey
1	Oct 12, 2022	NBC10 Boston; NECN; WNEU	Latoyia Edwards	Link	P	P
2	Oct 20, 2022	WCVB-TV; The Boston Globe; WBUR-FM; Univision	Ed Harding	YouTube	P	P

=== Results ===
2022 Massachusetts gubernatorial election
Party	Candidate	Votes	%	±%
Democratic	Maura Healey; Kim Driscoll	1,584,403	63.74%	+30.62%
Republican	Geoff Diehl; Leah Cole Allen	859,343	34.57%	−32.03%
Libertarian	Kevin Reed; Peter Everett	39,244	1.58%	N/A
Write-in		2,806	0.11%	−0.17%
Total votes		2,485,796	100.0%	
Turnout		2,511,461	51.4%	−9.37%
Registered electors				
Democratic gain from Republican				

==== By county ====
2022 Massachusetts gubernatorial election results by county
County	Healey		Diehl		Other		Total
County	Votes	%	Votes	%	Votes	%	Total
Barnstable	70,163	59.54%	46,011	39.04%	1,668	1.42%	117,842
Berkshire	34,898	71.18%	13,205	26.93%	927	1.89%	49,030
Bristol	98,969	53.97%	81,033	44.19%	3,388	1.84%	183,390
Dukes	7,185	76.90%	2,011	21.52%	147	1.57%	9,343
Essex	177,760	61.98%	104,400	36.40%	4,656	1.62%	286,816
Franklin	22,287	70.50%	8,788	27.80%	540	1.71%	31,615
Hampden	75,523	54.63%	60,203	43.55%	2,513	1.82%	138,239
Hampshire	46,679	71.99%	17,138	26.43%	1,021	1.58%	64,838
Middlesex	426,064	70.33%	169,707	28.02%	10,005	1.65%	605,766
Nantucket	3,262	66.53%	1,553	31.67%	88	1.79%	4,903
Norfolk	183,795	64.49%	96,607	33.90%	4,583	1.61%	284,985
Plymouth	115,810	53.92%	95,669	44.54%	3,315	1.54%	214,794
Suffolk	159,232	79.05%	38,886	19.31%	3,310	1.64%	201,428
Worcester	162,786	55.59%	124,132	42.39%	5,898	2.01%	292,807

Counties that flipped from Republican to Democratic

- All 12

==== By congressional district ====
Healey won all nine congressional districts by double digit landslides.

District	Diehl	Healey	Representative
1st	41%	58%	Richard Neal
2nd	35%	63%	Jim McGovern
3rd	37%	61%	Lori Trahan
4th	37%	62%	Jake Auchincloss
5th	25%	73%	Katherine Clark
6th	37%	61%	Seth Moulton
7th	14%	84%	Ayanna Pressley
8th	35%	64%	Stephen Lynch
9th	42%	56%	Bill Keating

== See also ==
- 2021–2022 Massachusetts legislature

== Notes ==
Partisan clients
