= Kim Driscoll =

American politician (born 1966)

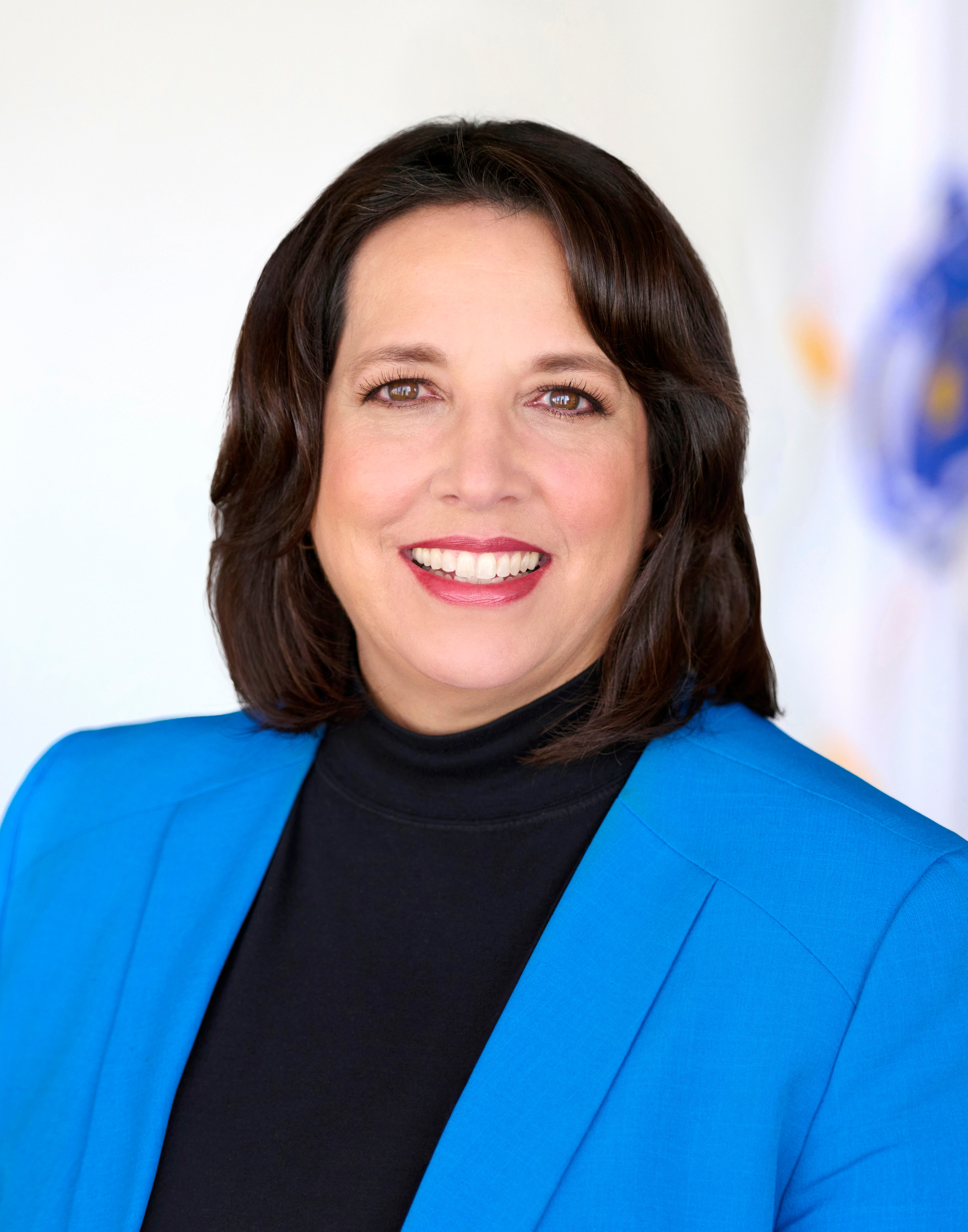
- Official portrait, 2023

73rd Lieutenant Governor of Massachusetts
- Incumbent
- Assumed office January 5, 2023
- Governor: Maura Healey
- Preceded by: Karyn Polito

50th Mayor of Salem
- In office January 2, 2006 – January 4, 2023
- Preceded by: Stanley Usovicz
- Succeeded by: Bob McCarthy

Personal details
- Born: August 12, 1966 (age 60) Hawaii, U.S.
- Party: Democratic
- Spouse: Nick Driscoll
- Children: 3
- Education: Salem State University (BA); Massachusetts School of Law (JD)

Kimberley Lord Driscoll (born August 12, 1966) is an American politician and lawyer serving as the 73rd lieutenant governor of Massachusetts since 2023. A member of the Democratic Party, Driscoll previously served as the 50th mayor of Salem from 2006 to 2023. Before becoming mayor, Driscoll served as an elected member of the Salem City Council and worked as the deputy city manager and chief legal counsel for the city of Chelsea.

== Early life and career ==
Driscoll was born in Hawaii while her father was serving in the United States Navy. Her mother was born in Grenada and raised in Trinidad. Driscoll moved to Salem, Massachusetts, in 1986 and graduated from Salem State College in 1989. She earned a Juris Doctor from the Massachusetts School of Law. After interning in Salem's planning department during college, Driscoll became Beverly's community development director. After graduating from law school, she spent three years as a real estate and commercial development attorney. Driscoll went on to serve as chief legal counsel and then as deputy city manager of Chelsea, Massachusetts, for five years. She was a city councilor for the fifth ward in Salem before running for mayor in 2005.

== Mayor of Salem ==
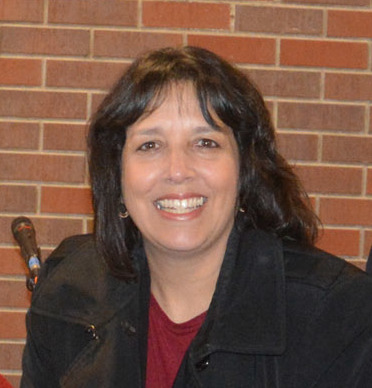
Driscoll in 2014

Driscoll was elected mayor of Salem in 2005, taking office in January 2006 at City Hall. She was re-elected to the position in 2009 with over 80% of the vote, and won again in 2013 and 2017.

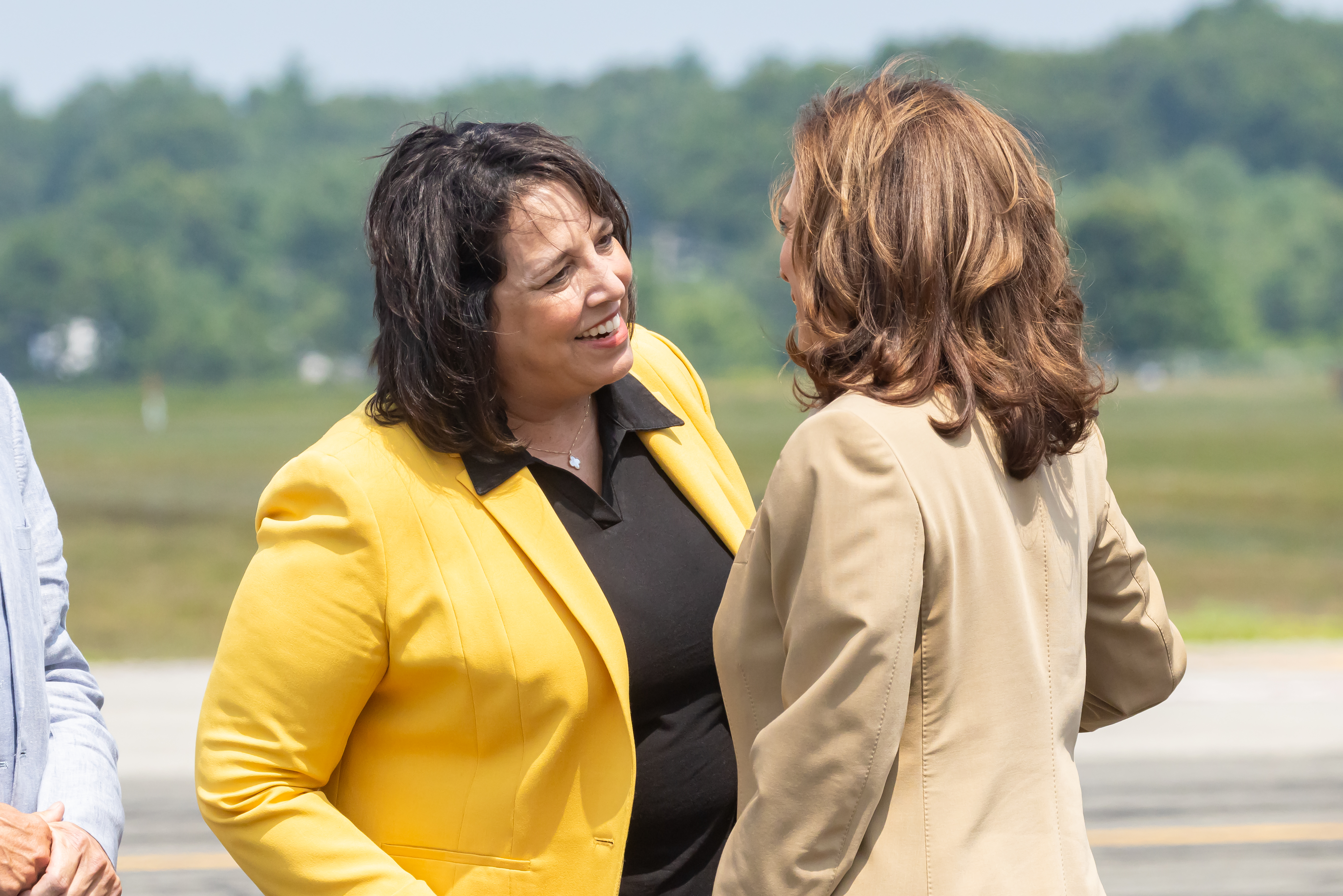
Driscoll and Vice President Kamala Harris in 2024

During Driscoll's time as mayor, Salem became one of 110 cities and towns in the state of Massachusetts designated as Commonwealth "Green Communities". This status made the city eligible for municipal renewable power and energy efficiency grants from the state. In 2013, Salem received eight stations where drivers can charge their electric vehicles; four are located at the Museum Place Mall, near the Peabody Essex Museum, and the other four are located inside the South Harbor parking garage across the street from the Salem Waterfront Hotel. Also in 2013, the city moved to a mandatory recycling program for trash pick up in Salem.

Driscoll obtained a federal grant to cover 90% of the cost of Nathaniel Bowditch, a $2.1 million 92-foot high-speed catamaran that travels from Salem to Boston annually from May to October. The maiden voyage took place on June 22, 2006. The ferry is named after Nathaniel Bowditch, who was from Salem and wrote the American Practical Navigator. In 2016, Driscoll set up for the Salem acquisition and redevelopment of the parcel at 289 Derby St. into a gateway park along the waterfront.

As of 2017, a $1 billion transformation of the Salem waterfront is underway. The project was originally proposed in 2006, and involved dredging to make the waters deeper for larger boats. In 2016, the city acquired the vacant parcel at 289 Derby Street for redevelopment as gateway park along the waterfront. The Salem Harbor Power Station, an old 1940s coal-powered facility, was replaced with a smaller and cleaner natural gas powered plant, occupying one-half of the original footprint, allowing for additional waterfront redevelopment in the future. 40-acres of prime waterfront land is up for sale, the largest deal in the city's modern history.

== Lieutenant governor of Massachusetts ==
In January 2022, Driscoll declared her candidacy for lieutenant governor of Massachusetts in the 2022 election. At the Massachusetts Democratic Party State convention in June 2022, Driscoll won support from 41.4 percent of the delegates, winning the endorsement of the Massachusetts Democratic Party. Since announcing her candidacy, Driscoll consistently led the field in the polls. She won the Democratic primary and faced Republican Leah Cole Allen in the November general election. Driscoll defeated Cole Allen.

On January 5, 2023, Driscoll was inaugurated as the lieutenant governor of Massachusetts. Healey and Driscoll won a second term in the 2026 election.

== See also ==
- List of female lieutenant governors in the United States

Political offices
Preceded by Stanley Usovicz	Mayor of Salem; 2006–2023	Succeeded by Bob McCarthy
Preceded by Karyn Polito	Lieutenant Governor of Massachusetts; 2023–present	Incumbent
Party political offices
Preceded by Quentin Palfrey	Democratic nominee for Lieutenant Governor of Massachusetts; 2022, 2026	Most recent
