= Massachusetts House of Representatives' 12th Essex district =

American legislative district

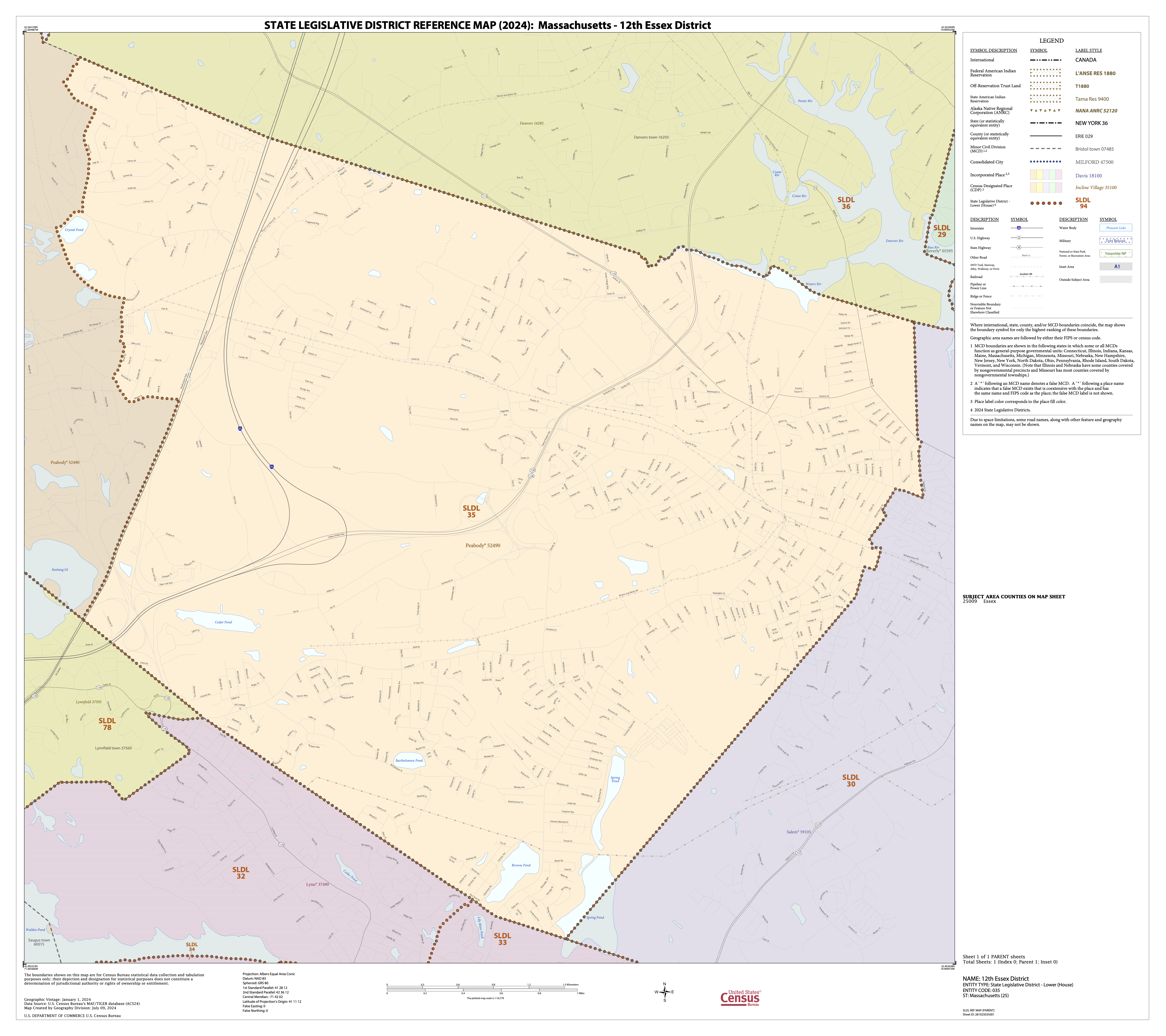
Map of Massachusetts House of Representatives' 12th Essex district, based on the 2020 United States census.

Massachusetts House of Representatives' 12th Essex district is one of 160 districts included in the lower house of the Massachusetts General Court. It covers part of the city of Peabody in Essex County. Democrat Tom Walsh of Peabody has represented the district since 2017.

The current district geographic boundary overlaps with that of the Massachusetts Senate's 2nd Essex district.

== Representatives ==
- John Lovejoy, circa 1858–1859
- William Davis Sohier, circa 1888
- Mial W. Chase, circa 1920
- Charles Symonds, circa 1920
- Walter A. Cuffe, circa 1951
- Joseph Francis Walsh, circa 1951
- Robert C. Buell, circa 1975
- Theodore C. Speliotis, 1979–1987
- John P. Slattery, 1995–2002
- Joyce Spiliotis, 2003–2012
- Leah Cole, 2013–2015
- Thomas P. Walsh, 2017–current

== Former locale ==
The district previously covered South Danvers, circa 1872.

== See also ==
- List of Massachusetts House of Representatives elections
- Other Essex County districts of the Massachusetts House of Representatives: 1st, 2nd, 3rd, 4th, 5th, 6th, 7th, 8th, 9th, 10th, 11th, 13th, 14th, 15th, 16th, 17th, 18th
- Essex County districts of the Massachusett Senate: 1st, 2nd, 3rd; 1st Essex and Middlesex; 2nd Essex and Middlesex
- List of Massachusetts General Courts
- List of former districts of the Massachusetts House of Representatives

== Images ==
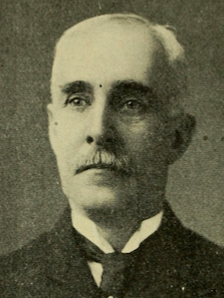
George Newhall

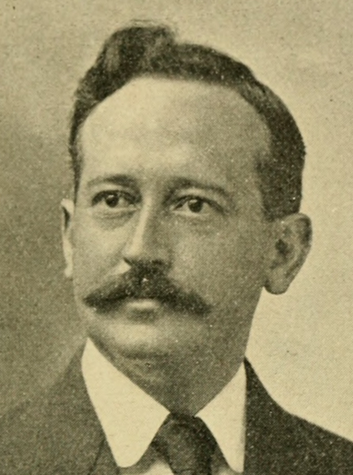
William Dorman

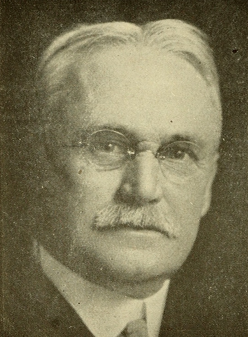
Charles Frothingham

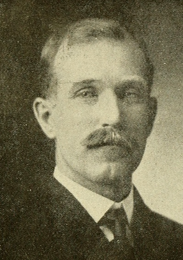
George Allen

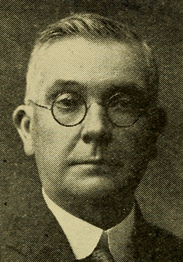
Charles Ames

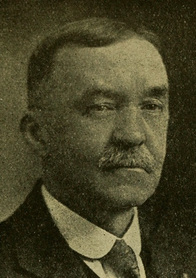
Charles Symonds

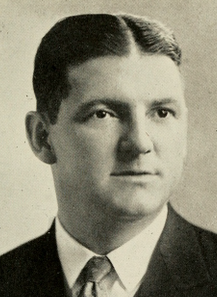
Edmond Talbot

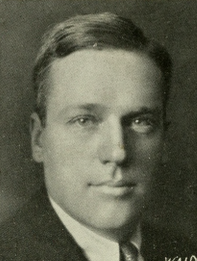
Malcolm Bell

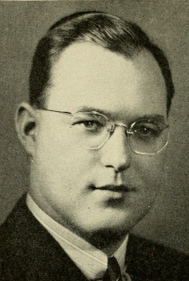
Edward Butterworth

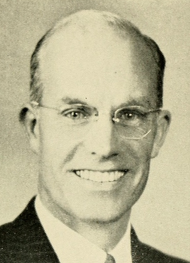
Norman Folsom

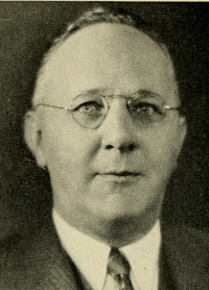
Robert Sisson

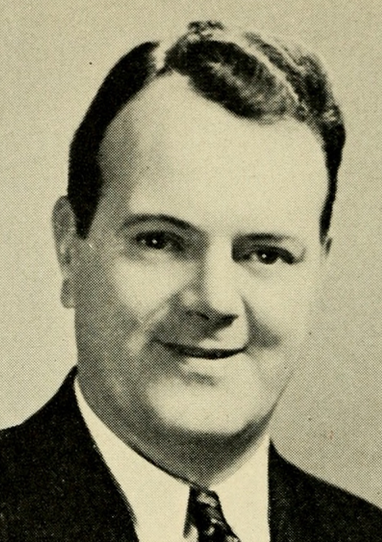
Joseph Francis Walsh

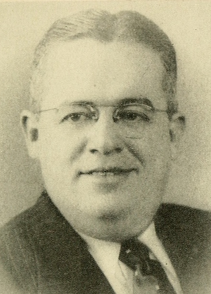
Pasquale Caggiano

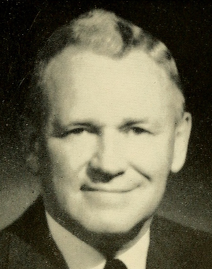
Arthur Williams

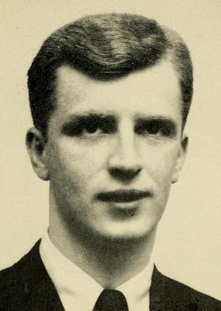
James Hurrell

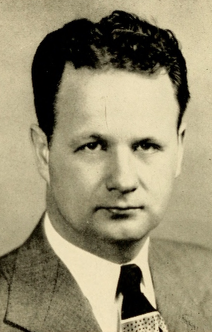
William Longworth

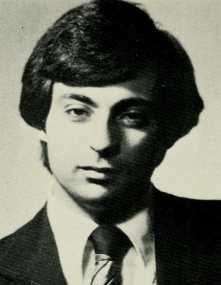
Theodore Speliotis

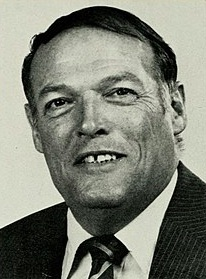
Robert Buell

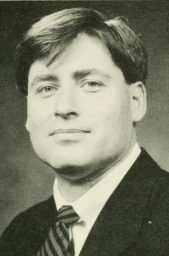
John Slattery
