= John P. Slattery =

American politician

John Slattery
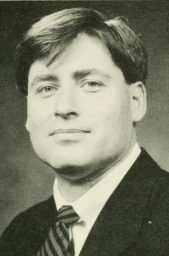
- official portrait, circa 1995

Member of the Massachusetts House of Representatives from the 12th Essex district
- In office 1995–2003
- Preceded by: Thomas Walsh
- Succeeded by: Joyce Spiliotis

Member of the Peabody City Council
- In office 1993–1994

Personal details
- Born: April 5, 1958 (age 68) Beverly, Massachusetts
- Party: Democratic
- Spouse: Nancy Slattery
- Education: Suffolk University; Suffolk University Law School

John P. Slattery (born April 5, 1958) is an American former politician who represented the 12th Essex district in the Massachusetts House of Representatives from 1995 to 2003 and was a Peabody, Massachusetts City Counclior from 1993 to 1994.

While originally a staunch supporter of the death penalty, Slattery later came to oppose it, with his vote against a 1997 bill to reinstate the practice in Massachusetts causing the resolution to fail. Slattery changed his mind after the Louise Woodward case. He also expressed concern over the bill providing insufficient protection to minorities and not exempting juvenile offenders from execution.

Slattery ran for lieutenant governor of Massachusetts in 2002, but lost the Democratic nomination to Chris Gabrieli. He was a candidate for mayor of Peabody in 2005, but lost to incumbent Michael Bonfanti. In 2012, John announced his plans to run for Massachusetts State Senate. He lost the Democratic primary to Joan Lovely, then a member of the Salem city council.
