= Kate Campanale =

American politician

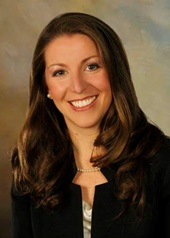

Member of the Massachusetts House of Representatives from the 17th Worcester district
- In office January 7, 2015 – January 2, 2019
- Preceded by: John Binienda
- Succeeded by: David LeBoeuf

Personal details
- Born: circa 1986 (age 39–40) Worcester, Massachusetts, U.S.
- Party: Republican
- Spouse: Peter Durant
- Education: Sweet Briar College (BA)
- Website: Campaign website

Kate D. Campanale (born circa 1986) is an American politician from Massachusetts. She was a member of the Massachusetts House of Representatives from 2015–2019. On March 1, 2022, Campanale announced her candidacy for Lieutenant Governor of Massachusetts, losing the primary election to Leah Cole Allen. If she was elected, Campanale would have directly followed Karyn Polito as being the second female former State Representative from Worcester County to be elected as Lieutenant Governor.

== Early life ==
Campanale was born in Worcester, Massachusetts and is the daughter of John and Debbie Campanale. Her older sister is Jennifer. Campanale grew up in Leicester, Massachusetts, and graduated from Leicester High School.

== Education ==
In 2007, Campanale earned a Bachelor of Arts degree in Business Management from Sweet Briar College in Sweet Briar, Virginia.

== Career ==
Campanale began her legislator career as a Staff Assistant to the Legislative & Regulatory Department of Pension Benefit Guaranty Corporation. She was a Business Development Coordinator at Tutor Perini Corporation, where she worked on multi-million dollar construction proposals.

Campanale is a former legislative aide and a substitute teacher. She served as the District Liaison to Peter Durant, a politician.

On November 4, 2014, at age 28, Campanale won election with 50.2% of the votes and became a Republican member of the Massachusetts House of Representatives for District 17 Worcester, defeating Doug Belanger, who received 49.7% of votes. In January 2015, Campanale was sworn into office. In November 2016, as an incumbent, Campanale won the election and continued serving District 17. She defeated Moses S. Dixon with 54.4% of the votes to Dixon's 45.3%.

In 2018, Campanale sought a seat in Register of Deeds for Worcester District without success. In the Republican Primary Election, she defeated Kevin J. Kuros with 67.4% of the votes. In the General Election, Campanale was defeated by Kathryn A. Toomey with 51.8% of the votes compared to Campanale's 48.2%.

On March 1, 2022, Campanale announced her candidacy for Lieutenant Governor of Massachusetts, running with businessman Chris Doughty of Wrentham, son of conservative William H. Doughty. Campanale would lose the 2022 republican primary to Leah Cole Allen, with Allen carrying 52.3% of the votes to Campanale's 47.7%.

Campanale expressed interest in running in the special election for the Worcester and Hampshire district seat in the Massachusetts Senate in the wake Anne Gobi's appointment as the state's Director of Rural Affairs. She did not run and the seat was won by her husband, Peter Durant

== Personal life ==
Campanale lived in Leicester, Massachusetts before moving to Spencer, Massachusetts. She is married to state senator Peter Durant.

== Awards ==
- Outstanding Service Award. Presented by Office of Policy & External Affairs.
- 2018 WBJ 40 Under 40 award. Named by Worcester Business Journal.

== See also ==
- 2016 Massachusetts general election
