= Lindsay Sabadosa =

American activist and politician

Member of the Massachusetts House of Representatives from the 1st Hampshire district
- Incumbent
- Assumed office January 2, 2019
- Preceded by: Peter Kocot

Personal details
- Citizenship: United States
- Party: Democratic
- Education: Wellesley College (AB), University of Edinburgh (MSc), Northeastern University (Doctorate of Law and Policy)

Lindsay Sabadosa is an American activist and politician. She is the first woman to hold the 1st Hampshire district seat in the Massachusetts House of Representatives.

== Early life ==
Lindsay Sabadosa has a doctorate in Law and Policy from Northeastern University, an MSc from the University of Edinburgh, and an AB from Wellesley College.

A native of Massachusetts, Sabadosa spent time abroad, studying at the Université Sorbonne Nouvelle and the Alma Mater Studiorum – Università di Bologna. Upon completion of her AB, she was the recipient of the Wellesley-Yenching Program Fellowship, which led her to spend a year in Nanjing, China as a fellow at Ginling College at Nanjing University. She later moved to Italy where she worked in marketing and communications at CUP2000, a company in Bologna.

Fluent in French and Italian, she opened her own small business in 2004, a translation firm, specializing in legal and financial translation with a focus on international litigation, contract law, and finance. She moved to Edinburgh to complete a MSc at the University of Edinburgh in translation, writing her dissertation on the markers of creativity in the Italian translations of Emily Dickinson's poetry while continuing to work full-time.

== Political activity ==
Sabadosa organized her first protest march at the age of nine to protest the closing of her hometown library due to budget cuts. She quickly became involved in political campaigns starting in high school, volunteering on campaigns for former Congressman John Olver, former Senator John Kerry, and several local officials. She soon began to focus her electoral work on women candidates, working for both local and state-wide women candidates, and ultimately joining the Board of Directors of Emerge Massachusetts in order to deepen and expand her interest in building benches.

Prior to her election, she volunteered with the Planned Parenthood Advocacy Fund of Massachusetts as well as being on the Board and Intake team of the Abortion Rights Fund of Western Massachusetts. She was also a founding board member of DARLA, the Doula Association for Reproductive Loss and Abortion, which brought abortion and reproductive loss doula training to the Pioneer Valley. She sat on the statewide organizing committees for Medicare for All and helped found the Western Massachusetts Safe Communities Act coalition. She was a member of the Northampton Democratic City Committee and represented her ward at the Democratic State Convention.

Sabadosa was first elected to the State House of Representatives in 2018, becoming the first woman to represent the First Hampshire District. In 2020, 2022, and 2024, she was re-elected in an uncontested race.

In the 2020 Presidential Election, Sabadosa was a Massachusetts Co-chair for the Bernie Sanders campaign.

== Committees ==
In 2025–2026, Sabadosa was the Vice Chair of the Joint Committee on Municipalities and Regional Government. She also serves on the House and Joint Committee on Ways and Means, the Joint Committee on Health Care Financing, and the Joint Committee on Transportation. She has previously served on the Joint Committee on Cannabis and the Joint Committee on Election Laws in prior terms.

Sabadosa is a long-standing member of the Massachusetts Caucus of Women Legislators and served as an at-large board member in 2023-2024 and 2025–2026. She is also a member of the Criminal Justice Reform Caucus, Progressive Caucus, the Trails Caucus, and the Regional Transit Authority Caucus. Along with Senator Jamie Eldridge, she founded the first state-level Medicare for All Caucus in 2019, which they co-chair.

== Legislation ==
In the 2019-2020 legislative cycle, Sabadosa passed legislation with Representative Nika Elugardo and Senator Jason Lewis to reexamine the Commonwealth's flag and seal, legislation that had been filed for nearly twenty years before its passage.

She quickly focused on reproductive health care and maternal health, passing over the next two terms legislation to require medication abortion readiness on public college campuses (in partnership with Senator Jason Lewis, to raise awareness about pregnancy loss, to designate pregnancy loss as a qualifying event to take earned sick time (in partnership with Senator Joan Lovely, to codify MassHealth coverage of doula care (in partnership with Senator Liz Miranda, and various provisions of her Full Spectrum Pregnancy Coverage legislation, which removed deductibles and copays for abortion care in Massachusetts and made full spectrum pregnancy care fully covered, without cost-sharing, by MassHealth (in partnership with Representative Ruth Balser and Senator Cindy Friedman. She also worked with Representative Christine Barber and Senator Michael O. Moore to pass legislation allowing pharmacists to prescribe hormonal contraception, which was implemented in the Commonwealth in 2024.

A long-time supporter of rail trails, Sabadosa also passed legislation, in partnership with Representative Carmine Gentile and Senator Jamie Eldridge, to allow Community Preservation Act dollars to be used to purchase defunct rail lines, helping to spur the creation of more greenways.

Sabadosa's legislative priorities span the gambit from bills to support solar installation on disturbed lands to criminal justice reform to workers' rights legislation to Medicare for All.

== Women's March ==
In 2016, Sabadosa joined the Massachusetts Chapter of the Women's March on Washington days after the November election, organizing contingents travelling to Washington DC and Boston as well as a local march in Northampton. In February 2017, she created the Pioneer Valley Women's March (PVWM), which organized dozens of community events on a variety of social justice issues with particular focus on involving the community in state-level advocacy. In January 2018, PVWM held its anniversary march in Northampton with over 5,000 participants, the largest march ever held in the city. PVWM later joined the Pioneer Valley Resist Coalition, a group of over 30 grassroots activist and advocacy organizations that focus on social and environmental justice.

== Research ==
In 2024, Sabadosa completed her Doctorate in Law and Policy at Northeastern University, writing her doctoral thesis on Abortion and Bias within the Supreme Court. As part of her research, she created the Sabadosa Supreme Court Repository. The repository includes analysis of all abortion-related cases heard by the Supreme Court from 1965–present, coding them based on seven constitutional issues (due process, privacy, free speech, states' rights, fetal personhood, equal protection, and stare decisis). The repository is publicly available.

== Personal life ==
Sabadosa lives in Northampton with her daughter.

== See also ==
- 2019–2020 Massachusetts legislature
- 2021–2022 Massachusetts legislature
- 2023–2024 Massachusetts legislature
- 2025-2026 Massachusetts legislature
