= Massachusetts House of Representatives' 1st Hampshire district =

American legislative district

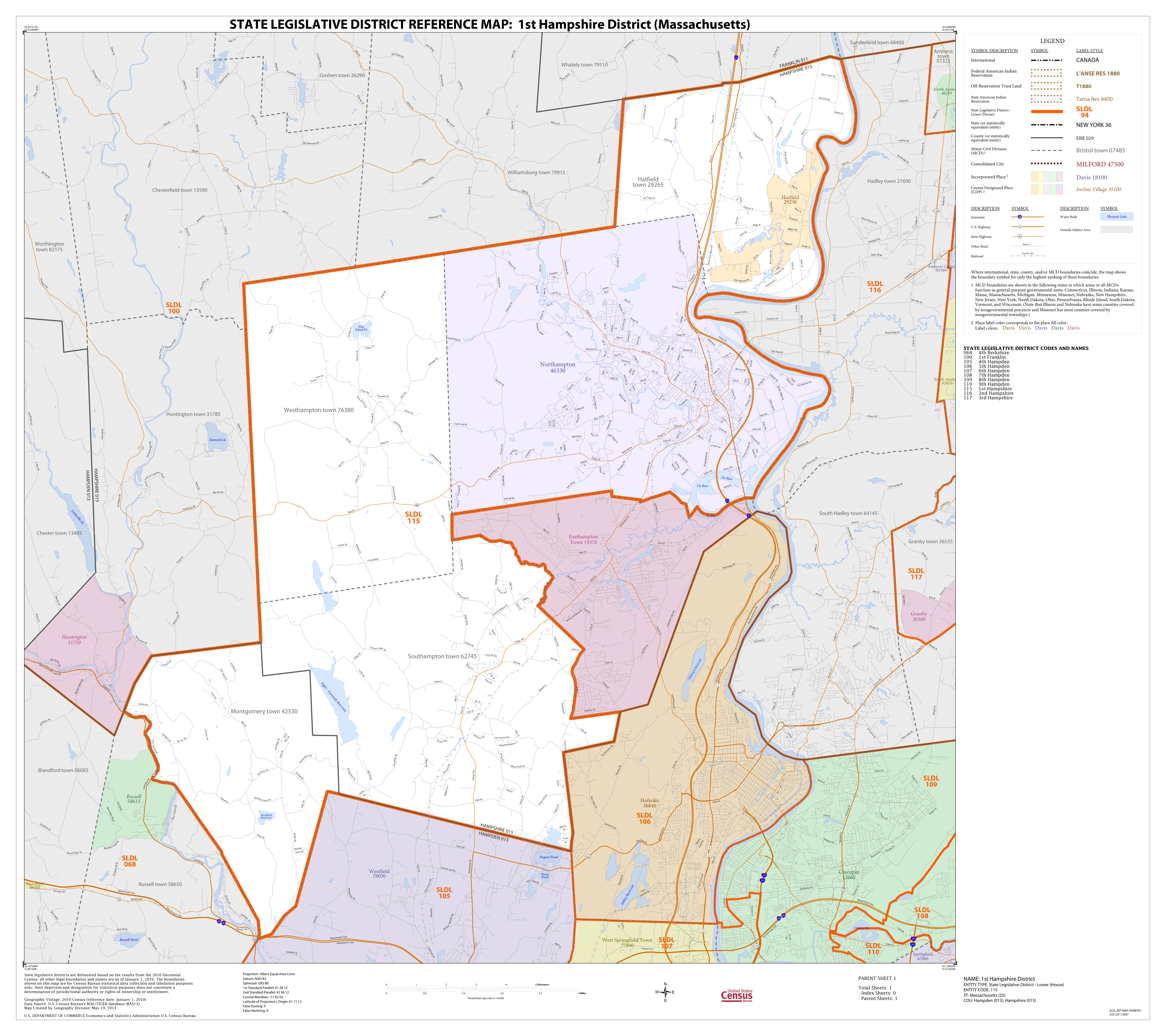
Map of Massachusetts House of Representatives' 1st Hampshire district, based on the 2010 United States census.

The Massachusetts House of Representatives 1st Hampshire district or "1st Hampshire" is an electoral district for the Massachusetts House of Representatives. It consists of the municipalities Northampton, Chesterfield, Cummington, Goshen, Hatfield, Plainfield, Westhampton, Williamsburg, and Worthington. Democrat Lindsay Sabadosa of Northampton has represented the district since 2019.

The current district geographic boundary overlaps with those of the Massachusetts Senate's Berkshire, Hampden, Franklin and Hampshire district and Hampshire, Franklin and Worcester district.

== District history ==
The district has existed in its current form since November 4, 2021, but has existed in name since at least 1970.

=== Former locales ===
The district previously covered:

- Southampton and Montgomery, 1970s–2021
- Easthampton, circa 1872
- Huntington, circa 1872

== Representatives ==
- William H. Dickinson, circa 1859
- William F. Arnold, circa 1859
- Calvin Coolidge, circa 1908 (later Governor of Massachusetts, Vice President, and President of the United States)
- Michael Fitzgerald, circa 1918
- William Grant, circa 1920
- James O'Dea, circa 1923
- Edwin Olander, circa 1935
- Jeremiah Lucey, circa 1945
- John O'Rourke, circa 1953
- Louis Morini, circa 1967

Representative	Party	Years
Edward McColgan	Democratic	1971 to 1975
William Nagle	Democratic	1975 to 2002
Peter Kocot	Democratic	2002 to 2018
Lindsay N. Sabadosa	Democratic	2018 to present

== Elections ==
Election data comes from Massachusetts Election Statistics.

=== 2018 ===
Candidate	Party	Votes	%
Lindsay N. Sabadosa	Democratic	18,001	99.1%
Others		166	0.9%
Blank		3,628	
Total		21,795	100%

=== 2016 ===
Candidate	Party	Votes	%
Peter Kocot	Democratic	20,145	99.6%
Others		89	0.4%
Blank		4,420	
Total		24,654	100%

=== 2014 ===
Candidate	Party	Votes	%
Peter Kocot	Democratic	13,937	99.5%
Others		68	0.5%
Blank		3,155	
Total		17,160	100%

=== 2012 ===
Candidate	Party	Votes	%
Peter Kocot	Democratic	19,090	99.6%
Others		74	0.4%
Blank		4,442	
Total		23,606	100%

=== 2010 ===
Candidate	Party	Votes	%
Peter Kocot	Democratic	14,284	99.4%
Others		83	0.6%
Blank		3,107	
Total		17,474	100%

=== 2008 ===
Candidate	Party	Votes	%
Peter Kocot	Democratic	19,124	99.5%
Others		94	0.5%
Blank		4,302	
Total		23,520	100%

== See also ==
- Other Hampshire County districts of the Massachusetts House of Representatives: 2nd, 3rd
- Hampshire County districts of the Massachusett Senate: Berkshire, Hampshire, Franklin, and Hampden; 1st Hampden and Hampshire; 2nd Hampden and Hampshire; Hampshire, Franklin and Worcester
- List of former districts of the Massachusetts House of Representatives

== Images ==
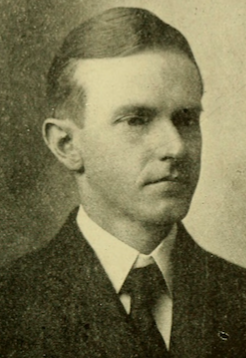
Calvin Coolidge

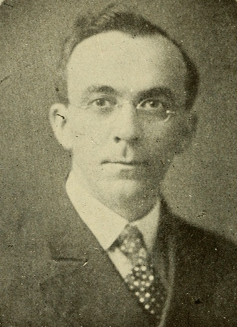
Michael Fitzgerald

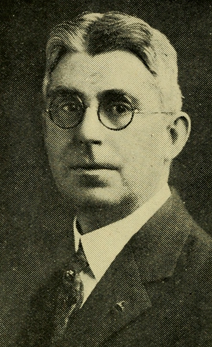
James O'Dea

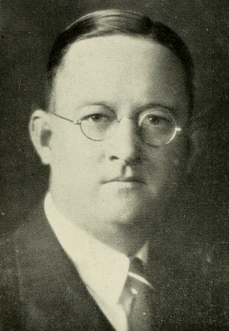
Edwin Olander

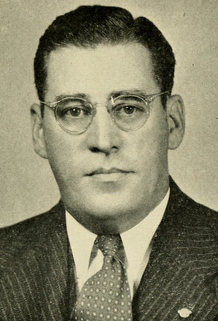
Jeremiah Lucey

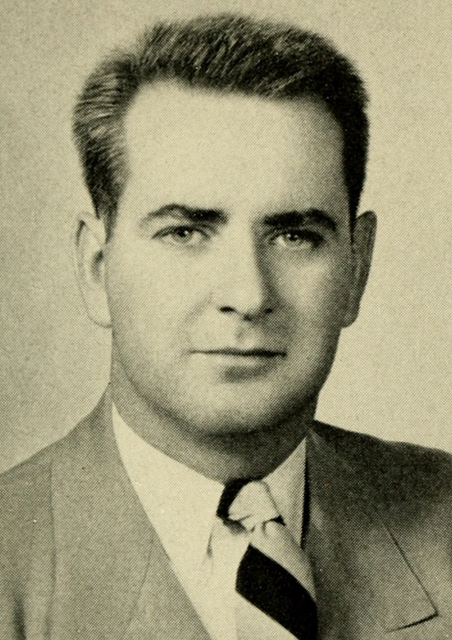
John O'Rourke

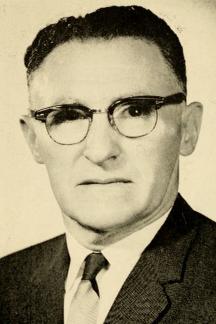
Louis Morini

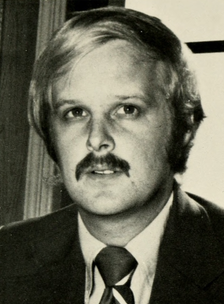
William Nagle

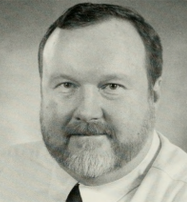
Peter Kocot
