= Leah Cole Allen =

American politician

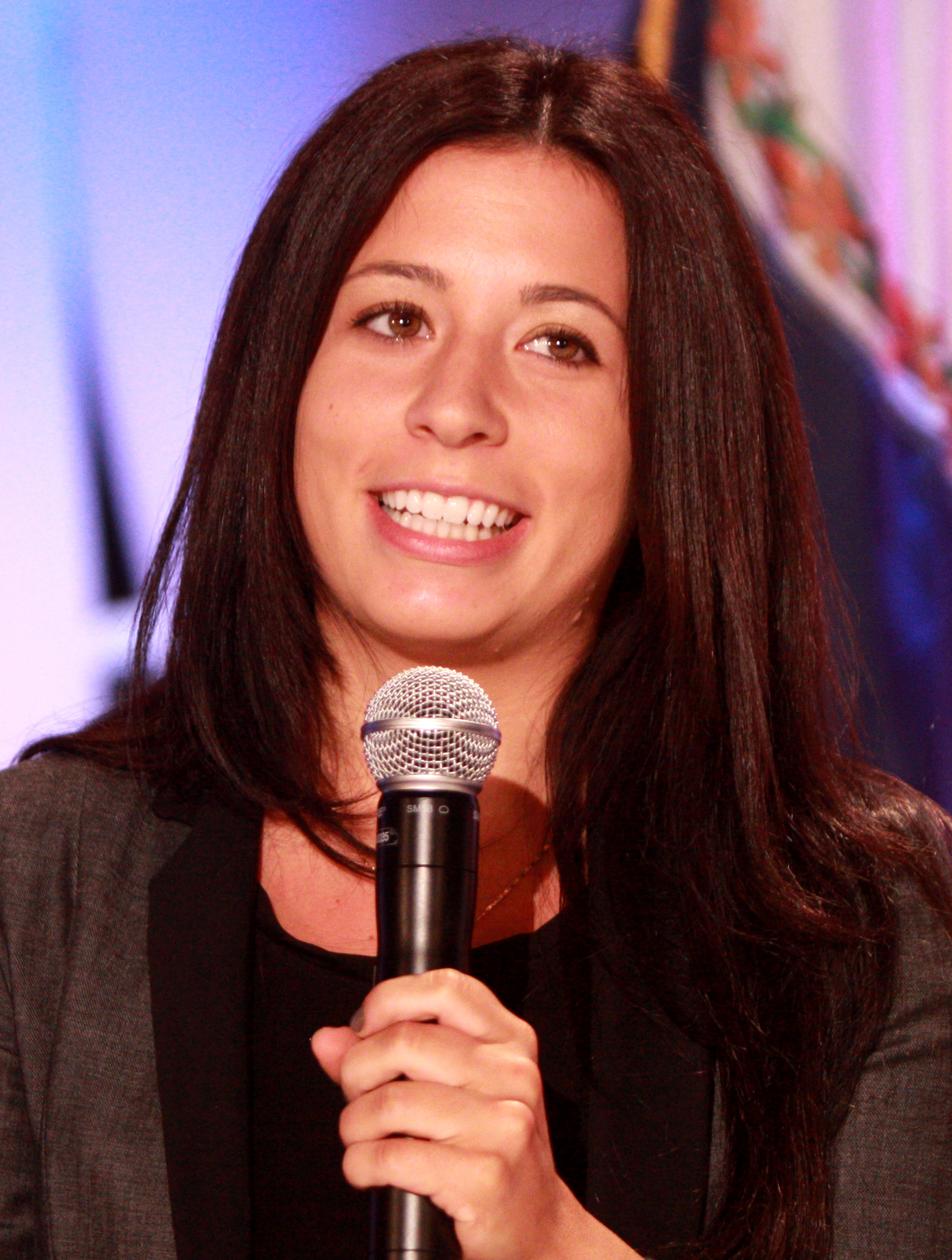
- Allen in 2013

Member of the Massachusetts House of Representatives from the 12th Essex district
- In office May 1, 2013 – September 28, 2015
- Preceded by: Joyce Spiliotis
- Succeeded by: Thomas Walsh

Personal details
- Born: October 15, 1988 (age 37) Lynn, Massachusetts, U.S.
- Party: Republican

Leah G. Cole Allen (born October 15, 1988) is an American politician who served in the Massachusetts House of Representatives and was the Republican nominee for Lieutenant Governor of Massachusetts in the 2022 Massachusetts gubernatorial election.

== State representative ==
Allen was elected to the Massachusetts House of Representatives in 2013. A first time candidate, she defeated Democrat Beverley Griffin Dunne 35% to 34% in a special election to fill the 12th Essex District seat that had been vacant since the death of Joyce Spiliotis the previous November. She was reelected in 2014 and remained in the House until September 28, 2015, when she resigned to focus on her nursing career.

== 2022 campaign for Lieutenant Governor ==
Allen lost her nursing job at Beverly Hospital for not complying with a COVID-19 vaccine mandate. Allen then entered the 2022 election for Lieutenant Governor of Massachusetts as the running mate of Geoff Diehl. She defeated Kate Campanale in the primary election to win the Republican nomination. Allen and Diehl lost the general election to Democrats Maura Healey and Kim Driscoll.

== Personal life ==
She was born in Lynn, Massachusetts.

Massachusetts House of Representatives
Preceded by Joyce Spiliotis	Member of the Massachusetts House of Representatives from the 12th Essex district 2013–2015	Succeeded by Thomas Walsh
Party political offices
Preceded by Karyn Polito	Republican nominee for Lieutenant Governor of Massachusetts; 2022	Most recent
