= Massachusetts House of Representatives' 1st Franklin district =

American legislative district

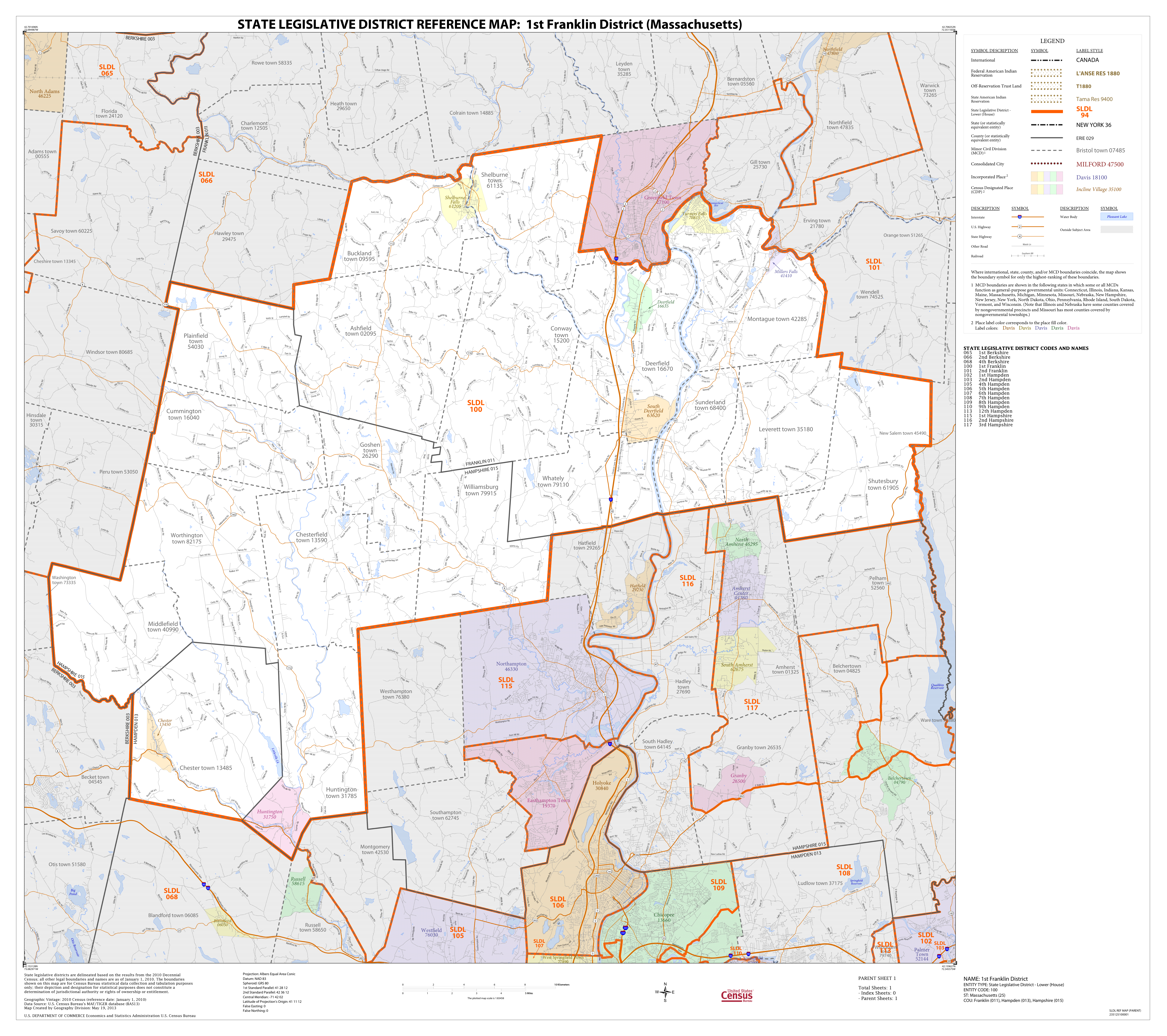
Map of Massachusetts House of Representatives' 1st Franklin district, based on the 2010 United States census.

Massachusetts House of Representatives' 1st Franklin district in the United States is one of 160 legislative districts included in the lower house of the Massachusetts General Court. It covers parts of Franklin County and Hampshire County. The seat is currently vacant. Democrat Natalie Blais of Sunderland represented the district from 2019 until January 2026.

== Towns represented ==
The district includes the following localities:

- Ashfield
- Buckland
- Chester
- Chesterfield
- Conway
- Cummington
- Deerfield
- Goshen
- Huntington
- Leverett
- Middlefield
- Montague
- Plainfield
- Shelburne
- Shutesbury
- Sunderland
- Whately
- Williamsburg
- Worthington

The current district geographic boundary overlaps with those of the Massachusetts Senate's Berkshire, Hampshire, Franklin and Hampden and Hampshire, Franklin and Worcester districts.

=== Former locales ===
The district previously covered:

- Bernardston, circa 1927
- Charlemont, circa 1927
- Colrain, circa 1927
- Hawley, circa 1927
- Heath, circa 1927
- Leyden, circa 1927
- Monroe, circa 1927
- New Salem, circa 1872
- Northfield, circa 1927
- Orange, circa 1872
- Rowe, circa 1927
- Warwick, circa 1872

== Representatives ==
- Pliny Fisk, circa 1858
- Hugh B. Miller, circa 1859
- George D. Wells, circa 1858-1859
- Freeman C. Griswold, circa 1888
- Charles river Elmer, circa 1908
- Albert Bray, circa 1918
- Walter H. Kemp, circa 1920
- Elisha Hooper, circa 1923
- Fred Dole, circa 1935
- George Fuller, circa 1945
- Philip F. Whitmore, circa 1951
- Winston Healy, circa 1970
- Jonathan L. Healy, 1971–1993
- Stephen Kulik, 1993–2019
- Natalie M. Blais, 2019-2026

== See also ==
- Massachusetts House of Representatives' 2nd Franklin district
- List of Massachusetts House of Representatives elections
- List of Massachusetts General Courts
- List of former districts of the Massachusetts House of Representatives

== Images ==
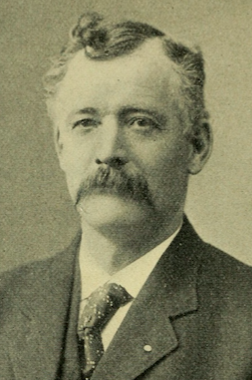
Charles Elmer

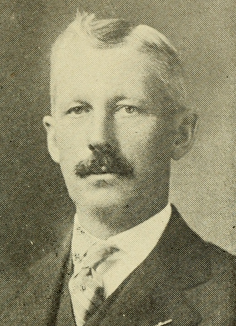
Albert Bray

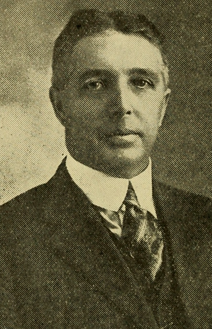
Elisha Hooper

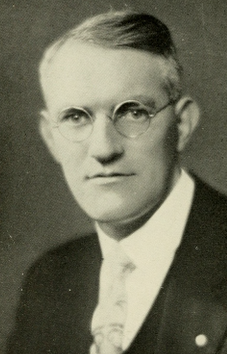
Fred Dole

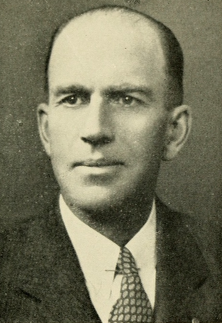
George Fuller

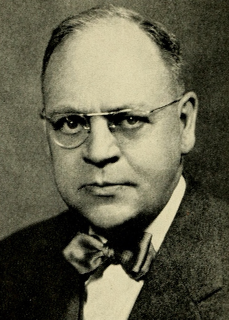
Philip Whitmore

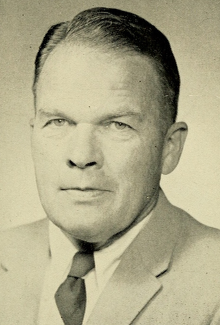
Winston Healy

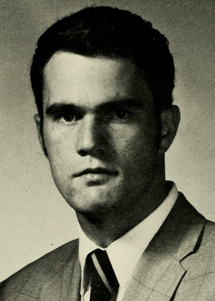
Jonathan Healy

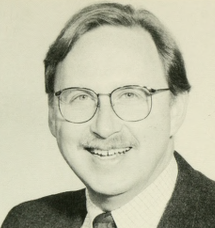
Stephen Kulik
