= Jonathan Healy (politician) =

American politician (born 1945)

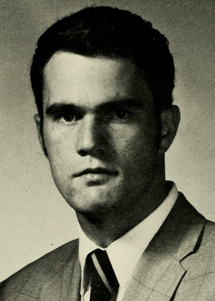

Member of the Massachusetts House of Representatives from the 1st Franklin District
- In office 1971–1993
- Preceded by: Winston Healy
- Succeeded by: Stephen Kulik

Massachusetts Commissioner of Food and Agriculture
- In office 1993–2003
- Preceded by: Gregory A. Watson
- Succeeded by: Douglas Gillespie

Personal details
- Born: October 10, 1945 (age 80) Greenfield, Massachusetts
- Party: Republican
- Education: Williams College
- Occupation: Farmer; Politician

Jonathan Healy (born October 10, 1945, in Greenfield, Massachusetts) is an American politician who represented the 1st Franklin district in the Massachusetts House of Representatives from 1971 to 1993 and served as the state's Commissioner of Food and Agriculture from 1993 to 2003.
