= Peter Kocot =

American politician (1956–2018)

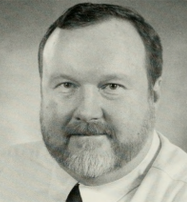
- Portrait of Peter Vincent Kocot

Member of the Massachusetts House of Representatives from the 1st Hampshire district
- In office April, 2002 – February 22, 2018
- Preceded by: William P. Nagle Jr.
- Succeeded by: Lindsay N. Sabadosa

Personal details
- Born: September 18, 1956 Northampton, Massachusetts
- Died: February 22, 2018 (aged 61) Northampton, Massachusetts
- Party: Democratic
- Spouse: Shauneen Kocot
- Education: Brown University
- Occupation: Legislator

Peter Vincent Kocot (September 18, 1956 – February 22, 2018) was an American politician who was representative to the state legislature of Massachusetts from April 2002 until his death in February 2018. A member of the Democratic Party, he represented the First Hampshire district, which includes Montgomery, Hatfield, Southampton, Westhampton, and Northampton. His positions included support of gay marriage and opposition to education spending cuts.

Kocot easily won re-election in 2006; his Republican opponent, Western New England College Economics professor John Andrulis (whom Kocot also faced in 2002 and 2004), polled at 18 percent.

In the state legislature, Kocot was the chairman of the Joint Committee on State Administration and Regulatory Oversight and a member of the House Committee on Ethics.

== Biography ==
Kocot was one of five children (Paul, Joseph, Mary, and Kathy) born to Dorothy and Edward Kocot on September 18, 1956. He was born in Northampton, Massachusetts, but raised in Florence, Massachusetts.

== Personal life and death ==
Kocot had two sons, Jake and Luke, with his wife of 29 years, Shauneen (née O'Donnell).

Kocot died on February 21, 2018, after a brief illness, at the age of 61.
