= David LeBoeuf =

Massachusetts politician

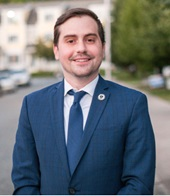

Member of the Massachusetts House of Representatives from the 17th Worcester district
- Incumbent
- Assumed office January 2, 2019
- Preceded by: Kate Campanale

Personal details
- Born: David Henry Argosky LeBoeuf; May 26, 1989 (age 37) Worcester, Massachusetts, U.S.
- Party: Democratic
- Education: South High Community School
- Alma mater: Clark University; Harvard University (BA)
- Website: Campaign website

David Henry Argosky LeBoeuf (born May 26, 1989) is a member of the Massachusetts House of Representatives who has represented the 17th Worcester District since his election in 2019. His district is made up of the town of Leicester, including Cherry Valley and Rochdale, and the city of Worcester, including Clark University, Main South, Hadwen Park, and Webster Square. In the 193rd House (2023-2024), LeBoeuf serves on the House Committee on Post Audit and Oversight, the Joint Committee on Children, Families and Persons with Disabilities, the Joint Committee on Housing, and the Joint Committee on Consumer Protection and Professional Licensure.

== Committee History ==
191st House (2019-2020)

- House Committee on Global Warming and Climate Change
- Joint Committee on Cannabis Policy
- Joint Committee on Children, Families and Persons with Disabilities
- Joint Committee on Consumer Protection and Professional Licensure

192nd House (2021-2022)

- Joint Committee on Children, Families and Persons with Disabilities
- Joint Committee on Consumer Protection and Professional Licensure
- Joint Committee on Financial Services
- Joint Committee on Housing

193rd House (current, 2023-2024)

- House Committee on Post Audit and Oversight
- Joint Committee on Children, Families and Persons with Disabilities
- Joint Committee on Consumer Protection and Professional Licensure
- Joint Committee on Housing

== Personal life ==
=== Education ===
LeBoeuf is a lifelong Worcester resident and graduate of South High Community School, where he was the 2008 Valedictorian and National Honor Society inductee. He then enrolled at Clark University, before transferring to Harvard University, where he graduated in 2013 with a Bachelor of Arts in Social Studies and a secondary field in Spanish, in which he has professional proficiency.

=== Arrest ===
On April 26, 2022, LeBoeuf was charged with drunken driving, with a blood-alcohol level tested at 0.329, "roughly four times the legal limit." On June 21, he pleaded guilty and was sentenced to one year of probation, fined $600 (as well as $65 per month in probation fees), and was "required to complete a driver’s alcohol education course." In addition, his license was suspended for 45 days.

Political offices
Preceded by Kate Campanale	Massachusetts State Representative; January 9, 2019 – present	Incumbent
