= Joyce Spiliotis =

American politician

Member of the Massachusetts House of Representatives from the 12th Essex district
- In office 2003–2012
- Preceded by: John P. Slattery
- Succeeded by: Leah Cole Allen

Member of the Peabody City Council
- In office 1994–2003

Personal details
- Born: December 27, 1946 Peabody, Massachusetts
- Died: November 29, 2012 (aged 65)
- Party: Democratic
- Spouse: Richard Jarvis
- Education: Peabody High School
- Occupation: Politician

Joyce A. Spiliotis (December 27, 1946 – November 29, 2012) was an American politician.

She was born in Peabody, Massachusetts, and represented the 12th Essex district in the Massachusetts House of Representatives from 2003 until her death in 2012 and was a Peabody city councilor from 1994 to 2003.
