= Cheryl Coakley-Rivera =

American politician

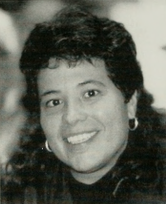
- Rivera in 2005

Register of Deeds for Hampden County
- Incumbent
- Assumed office January 3, 2019
- Preceded by: Donald E. Ashe, Sr.

Member of the Massachusetts House of Representatives from the 10th Hampden district
- In office January 1999 – March 2014
- Preceded by: Anthony M. Scibelli
- Succeeded by: Carlos Gonzalez

Personal details
- Party: Democratic

Cheryl A. Coakley-Rivera (previously Cheryl A. Rivera) is an American politician from the Commonwealth of Massachusetts. A Democrat, she served in the Massachusetts House of Representatives from 1999 to 2014.

In the legislature, she represented the Tenth Hampden district, centered on her hometown of Springfield. She is chaired the Joint Committee on Labor and Workforce Development.

She is an attorney and earned a Juris Doctor (J.D.) from Western New England College School of Law in 1995. She had previously earned a BA at Northeastern University. In 1998, following the death of Anthony M. Scibelli, who had held the seat for 40 years, Coakley-Rivera ran successfully for the House of Representatives, becoming the first Hispanic woman elected to the Massachusetts legislature. She took office the following January and has been re-elected biennially ever since, taking 85% of the vote in 2008.

She resigned in 2014 to accept an appointment as assistant clerk of the Hampden County Superior Court.

She was previously known as Cheryl A. Rivera. In March 2006, she changed her name in honor of her mother, Barbara Coakley Rivera, who had died the previous year. Her sister and nephew similarly changed their names.
