= Natalie Blais =

American politician

Member of the Massachusetts House of Representatives from the 1st Franklin district
- In office January 2, 2019 – January 19, 2026
- Preceded by: Stephen Kulik
- Succeeded by: Vacant

Personal details
- Party: Democratic

Natalie Blais is an American politician. She is a former State Representative for the 1st Franklin District of Massachusetts, which covers an area of 511.3 square miles. She was elected in 2018 following the retirement of Stephen Kulik. She resigned in January 2026 to take an administrative position at the University of Massachusetts Amherst. Blais is a member of the Democratic Party.

== See also ==
- 2019–2020 Massachusetts legislature
- 2021–2022 Massachusetts legislature
