= Joan Lovely =

American politician from Massachusetts

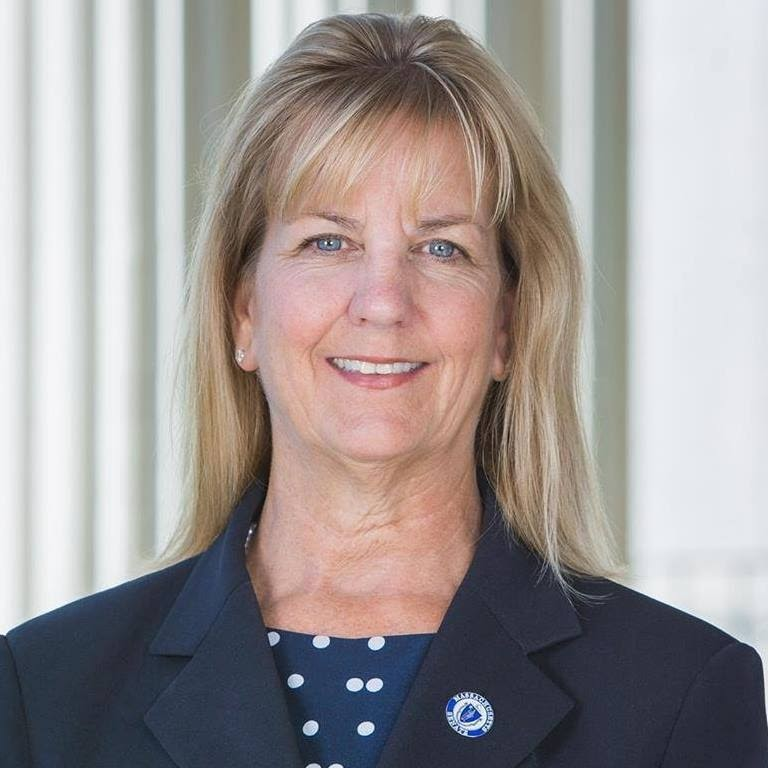
- official portrait, 2020

Member of the Massachusetts Senate from the 2nd Essex district
- Incumbent
- Assumed office January 2, 2013
- Preceded by: Frederick Berry

President of the Salem City Council
- In office 2001–2012

Member of the Salem City Council
- In office 1998–2012

Personal details
- Party: Democratic
- Education: Salem State University (BS); Massachusetts School of Law (JD)
- Occupation: Attorney

Joan Lovely is an American attorney and politician who serves as a member of the Massachusetts Senate for the 2nd Essex district. A member of the Democratic Party, her district includes Beverly, Peabody, Salem, and Danvers.

== Early life ==
Lovely earned an Associate of Applied Science at North Shore Technical High School in 1978. After starting a family in Salem, Massachusetts, she pursued higher education, earning a Bachelor of Science in Political Science from Salem State University in 2006, and then a Juris Doctor from Massachusetts School of Law in 2009.

She informally started her political career by advocating for the creation of a playground in Salem, being the co-chair of a committee seeking to create one in the Castle Hill Park.

== Political career ==
Prior to joining the Senate, Lovely served on the Salem City Council from 1998 to 2012 and was council president in 2001 and 2012.

In 2004, she ran unsuccessfully to succeed State Representative J. Michael Ruane, placing second in the Democratic primary.

In 2012, Lovely was elected to the Senate after defeating former State Representative John P. Slattery and Governor’s Councilor Mary-Ellen Manning in the Democratic primary.

=== Committee assignments ===
- Chairperson, Senate Committee on Rules
- Chairperson, Joint Committee on Rules
- Vice Chair, Joint Committee on Emergency Preparedness and Management
- Senate Committee on Climate Change and Global Warming
- Joint Committee on Aging and Independence
- Joint Committee on Agriculture and Fisheries
- Joint Committee on Community Development and Small Businesses

== Personal life ==
Lovely and her husband Stephen have three adult children.

== See also ==
- 2019–2020 Massachusetts legislature
- 2021–2022 Massachusetts legislature
