= Thomas Walsh (Massachusetts politician) =

American politician

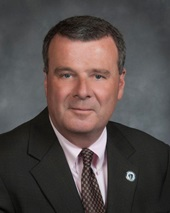

Member of the Massachusetts House of Representatives from the 12th Essex district
- Incumbent
- Assumed office March 9, 2016
- Preceded by: Leah Cole Allen
- In office 1987–1995
- Preceded by: Theodore C. Speliotis
- Succeeded by: John P. Slattery

Member of the Peabody City Council
- In office 2014–2016
- In office 1984–1987

Personal details
- Born: July 15, 1960 (age 66) Salem, Massachusetts, U.S.
- Party: Democratic
- Education: Salem State University (formerly Salem State College)
- Occupation: Account Manager; Politician

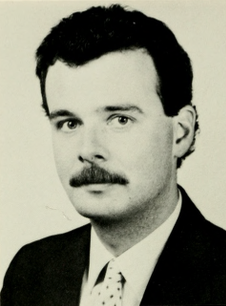
1987 state house portrait

Thomas P. Walsh (born July 15, 1960) is an American politician who serves as a member of the Massachusetts House of Representatives for the 12th Essex district. A member of the Democratic Party, he previously represented the district from 1987 to 1995.

Walsh served on the Peabody City Council from 1984 to 1987 and again from 2014 to 2016. He was also a member of the Peabody School Committee from 1998 to 2001.

In 2016, Walsh returned to the Massachusetts House of Representatives by winning a special election to replace Republican Leah Cole, who resigned to focus on her nursing career. He defeated Republican Stephanie Peach, a legislative aide to Cole, in the general election. As of 2024, Walsh has not faced another opponent in either a primary or general election.

== See also ==
- 2019–2020 Massachusetts legislature
- 2021–2022 Massachusetts legislature
