= Stephen Kulik =

American politician (1950–2022)

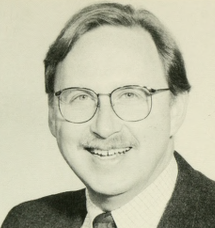

Member of the Massachusetts House of Representatives from the 1st Franklin district
- In office 1993–2019
- Preceded by: Jonathan Healy
- Succeeded by: Natalie Blais

Personal details
- Born: August 3, 1950 Boston, Massachusetts
- Died: December 18, 2022 (aged 72) Worthington, Massachusetts
- Party: Democratic
- Education: Newton Junior College; Northeastern University; University of Massachusetts Amherst
- Occupation: Politician

Stephen Kulik (August 3, 1950 – December 18, 2022) was an American politician who represented the 1st Franklin District in the Massachusetts House of Representatives from 1993 to 2019, was a member of the Worthington, Massachusetts Board of Selectmen from 1983 to 1994, and was a Hampshire County Commissioner from 1989 to 1992.

In 2018, Kulik did not run for re-election. The seat was won by fellow Democrat Natalie Blais.
