= Karyn Polito =

American politician and lawyer (born 1966)

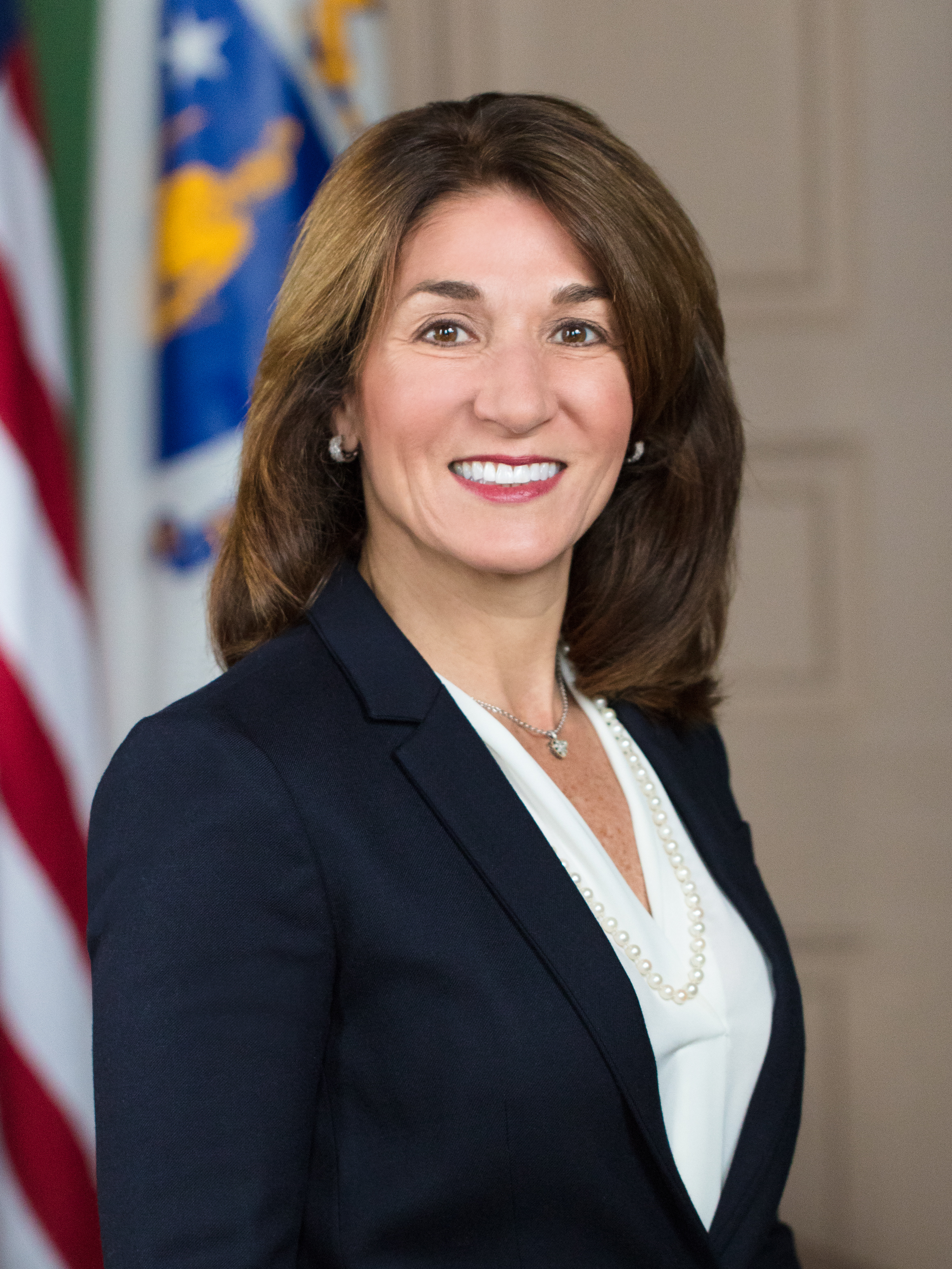
- Official photo, 2018

72nd Lieutenant Governor of Massachusetts
- In office January 8, 2015 – January 5, 2023
- Governor: Charlie Baker
- Preceded by: Tim Murray
- Succeeded by: Kim Driscoll

Member of the Massachusetts House of Representatives from the 11th Worcester district
- In office January 8, 2001 – January 8, 2011
- Preceded by: Ronald Gauch
- Succeeded by: Matthew Beaton

Personal details
- Born: Karyn Ellen Polito; November 11, 1966 (age 59) Shrewsbury, Massachusetts, U.S.
- Party: Republican
- Spouse: Stephan Rodolakis
- Children: 2
- Education: Boston College (BS); New England Law Boston (JD)

Karyn Ellen Polito (born November 11, 1966) is an American attorney, businesswoman, and politician who served as the 72nd lieutenant governor of Massachusetts from 2015 to 2023. Polito was a Republican member of the Massachusetts House of Representatives for the 11th Worcester district from 2001 to 2011. Polito was first elected lieutenant governor in 2014 with her running mate, Charlie Baker. They were both re-elected in 2018, and declined to seek reelection in 2022.

== Early life and education ==
Polito is a lifelong resident of Shrewsbury, Massachusetts. She graduated from Holy Name Central Catholic High School. Shortly after graduating from Boston College with a Bachelor of Science degree in 1988, she received her Juris Doctor from New England Law in 1991.

== Career ==
An attorney, Polito co-owns and operates a commercial real estate development firm.

Polito is a member of the Republican Party. Her experience in politics and government includes stints as a Shrewsbury Town Meeting member (1993–2000), a member of the Shrewsbury Zoning Board of Appeals (1994–1995), and a Shrewsbury selectman (1995–1998). Polito was the commissioner of the Massachusetts Lottery from 1999 to 2000. In 1998, Polito ran for the Massachusetts Senate in the Second Worcester district. However, she lost the general election to Guy Glodis.

=== Massachusetts House of Representatives ===
In 2000, Polito was elected State Representative for the 11th district of Worcester, which covers the town of Shrewsbury and precincts 1 and 4 of the adjacent town of Westborough in Worcester County. She served in the Massachusetts House of Representatives from 2001 to 2011, winning every election without any opposition.

=== 2010 state treasurer campaign ===
On March 1, 2010, Polito announced she would run for the office of treasurer and receiver-general of Massachusetts. She was unopposed in the Republican primary. Polito lost in the general election to Democratic candidate Steve Grossman, but won 45% of the vote, receiving the most votes of any Republican running for office in Massachusetts in 2010.

=== Lieutenant governor of Massachusetts ===
==== 2014 campaign ====
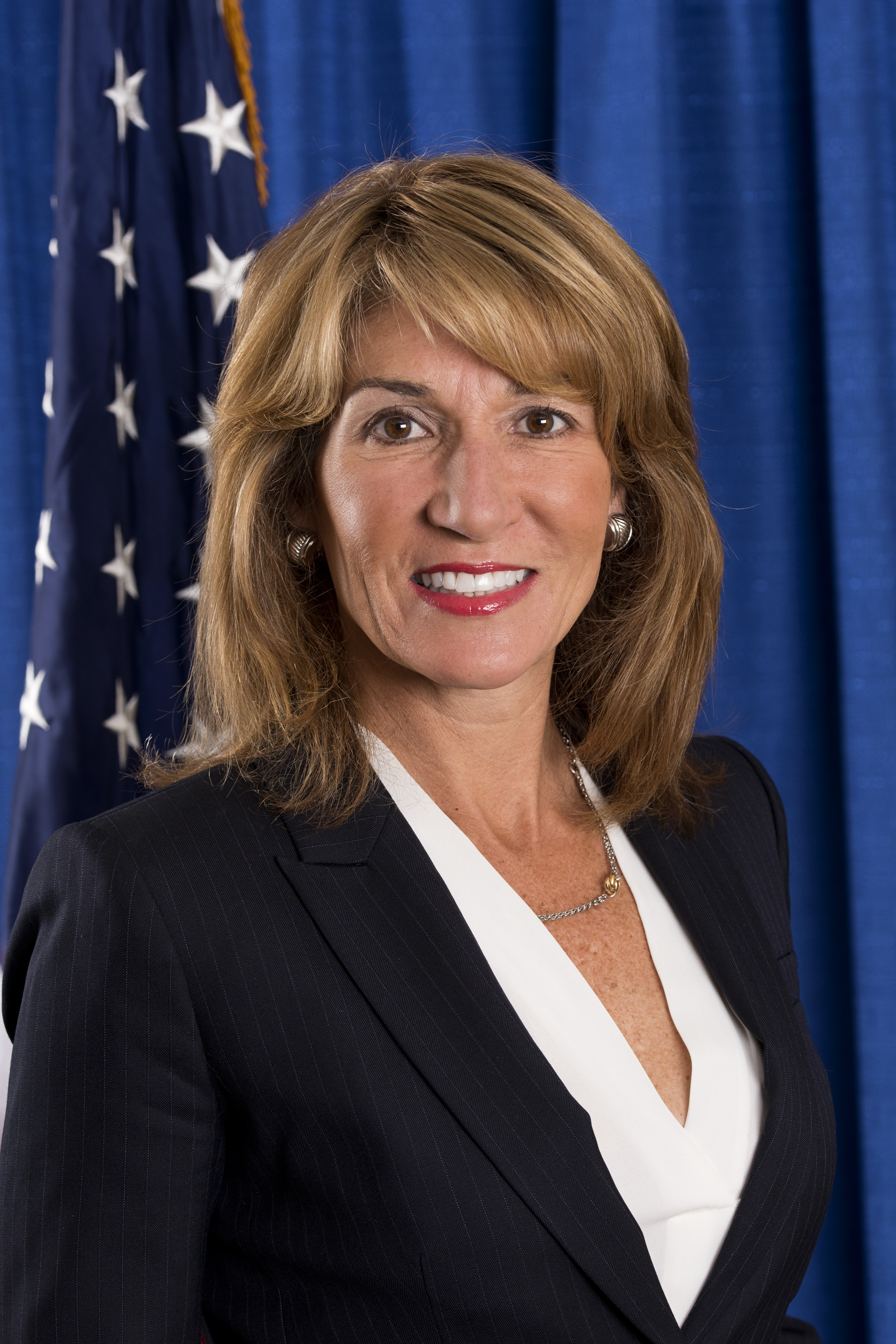
Polito during her first term in 2015

On December 3, 2013, Polito announced her candidacy for Lieutenant Governor of Massachusetts. The leading GOP candidate for Governor, Charlie Baker, endorsed her candidacy. She was not opposed in the September 2014 primary. Baker and Polito won the 2014 gubernatorial election, defeating Democratic candidates Martha Coakley and Steve Kerrigan, respectively, 48.40% to 46.54%.

==== 2018 campaign ====
In August 2018, Baker and Polito formally launched their re-election campaign. Both were successful in the Republican primary election held on September 4, 2018, with Polito running unopposed. Baker and Polito faced challengers Jay Gonzalez and Quentin Palfrey of the Democratic Party in the general election. The Baker/Polito ticket defeated the Gonzales/Palfrey ticket by a margin of 1,781,341 votes to 885,770.

=== Issues and record ===
Karyn Polito has been described as a socially moderate Republican who is generally conservative on most other issues. On the Issues, a non-partisan organization that records a politician's position on issues, considers her to be a "Moderate Conservative." Polito did not vote for President Donald Trump in 2016 and announced that she did not support Trump's re-election.

- Polito has supported term limits and eliminating state pensions for elected officials.
- She has been supportive of state tax cuts.
- She said she is proud of her pro-choice record, noting high ratings from NARAL Pro-Choice America and Planned Parenthood.
- Polito had an A+ rating from Gun Owners' Action League (GOAL), and an A− rating from the NRA Political Victory Fund.
- As a state representative in 2007, Polito voted yes on a constitutional amendment defining marriage as between one man and one woman. She did support same-sex civil unions. In 2013, however, Polito reversed her position and expressed public support for same-sex marriage.
- Polito opposed Donald Trump's executive order to build a wall on the southern border of the United States.

== Personal life ==
Polito resides in Shrewsbury, Massachusetts with her husband, Stephan M. Rodolakis, and their two children. Rodolakis is an attorney specializing in bankruptcy proceedings.

== Electoral history ==
Massachusetts House of Representatives 11th District Election, 2000
Party	Candidate	Votes	%
Republican	Karyn Polito	18,182	98.6
Write-ins	Write-ins	262	1.4

Massachusetts House of Representatives 11th District Election, 2002
Party	Candidate	Votes	%
Republican	Karyn Polito (inc.)	12,637	99.6
Write-ins	Write-ins	46	0.4

Massachusetts House of Representatives 11th District Election, 2004
Party	Candidate	Votes	%
Republican	Karyn Polito (inc.)	15,813	99.2
Write-ins	Write-ins	129	0.8

Massachusetts House of Representatives 11th District Election, 2006
Party	Candidate	Votes	%
Republican	Karyn Polito (inc.)	12,995	99.3
Write-ins	Write-ins	92	0.7

Massachusetts House of Representatives 11th District Election, 2008
Party	Candidate	Votes	%
Republican	Karyn Polito (inc.)	17,241	99.5
Write-ins	Write-ins	93	0.5

Massachusetts State Treasurer Election, 2010
Party	Candidate	Votes	%
Democratic	Steve Grossman	1,208,098	54.8
Republican	Karyn Polito	993,127	45.1
Write-ins	Write-ins	1,785	0.1

== See also ==
- List of female lieutenant governors in the United States

Party political offices
Vacant Title last held by Daniel Grabauskas; 2002	Republican nominee for Treasurer of Massachusetts; 2010	Succeeded by Mike Heffernan
Preceded by Richard Tisei	Republican nominee for Lieutenant Governor of Massachusetts; 2014, 2018	Succeeded by Leah Cole Allen
Political offices
Vacant Title last held by Tim Murray; 2013	Lieutenant Governor of Massachusetts; 2015–2023	Succeeded by Kim Driscoll
