= Carlos González (American politician) =

American politician

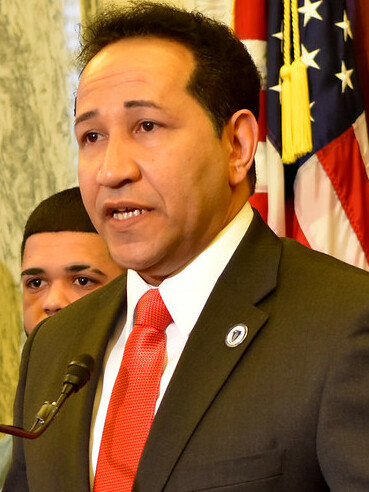

Member of the Massachusetts House of Representatives from the 10th Hampden district
- Incumbent
- Assumed office January 7, 2015
- Preceded by: Cheryl Coakley-Rivera

Personal details
- Party: Democratic

Carlos González is a member of the Massachusetts House of Representatives. He was sworn into office in January 2015. A resident of Springfield, Massachusetts, he was elected as a Democrat to represent the 10th Hampden district. González is president of the Massachusetts Latino Chamber of Commerce, a member of the Massachusetts Black and Latino Legislative Caucus, and a former aide to mayor Michael Albano.

In early 2023, Gonzalez made the news for the introduction of a bill to allow Massachusetts prisoners to earn time off from their sentences by donating organs or bone marrow.

== See also ==
- 2019–2020 Massachusetts legislature
- 2021–2022 Massachusetts legislature
