= Political positions of Bernie Sanders =

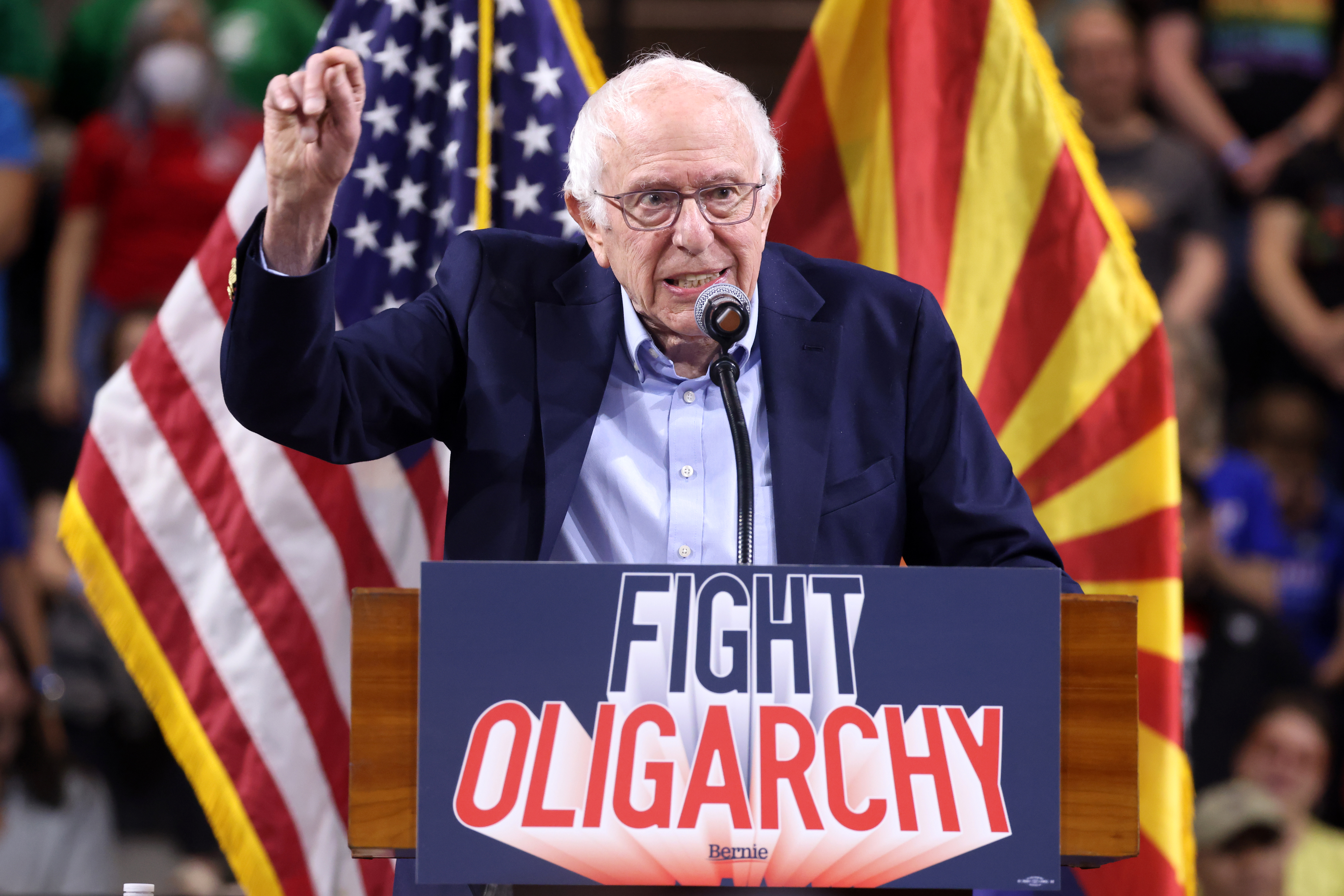
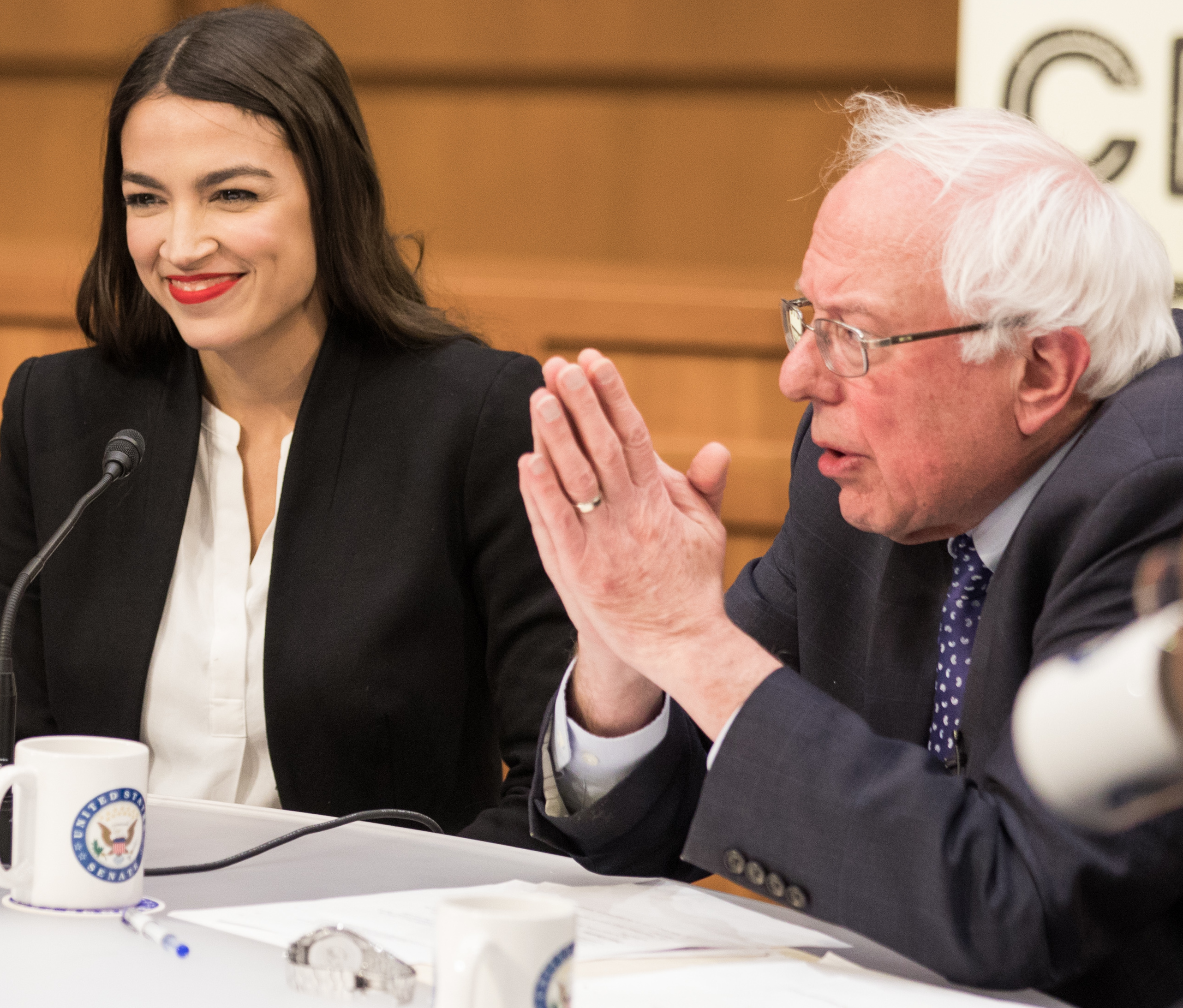
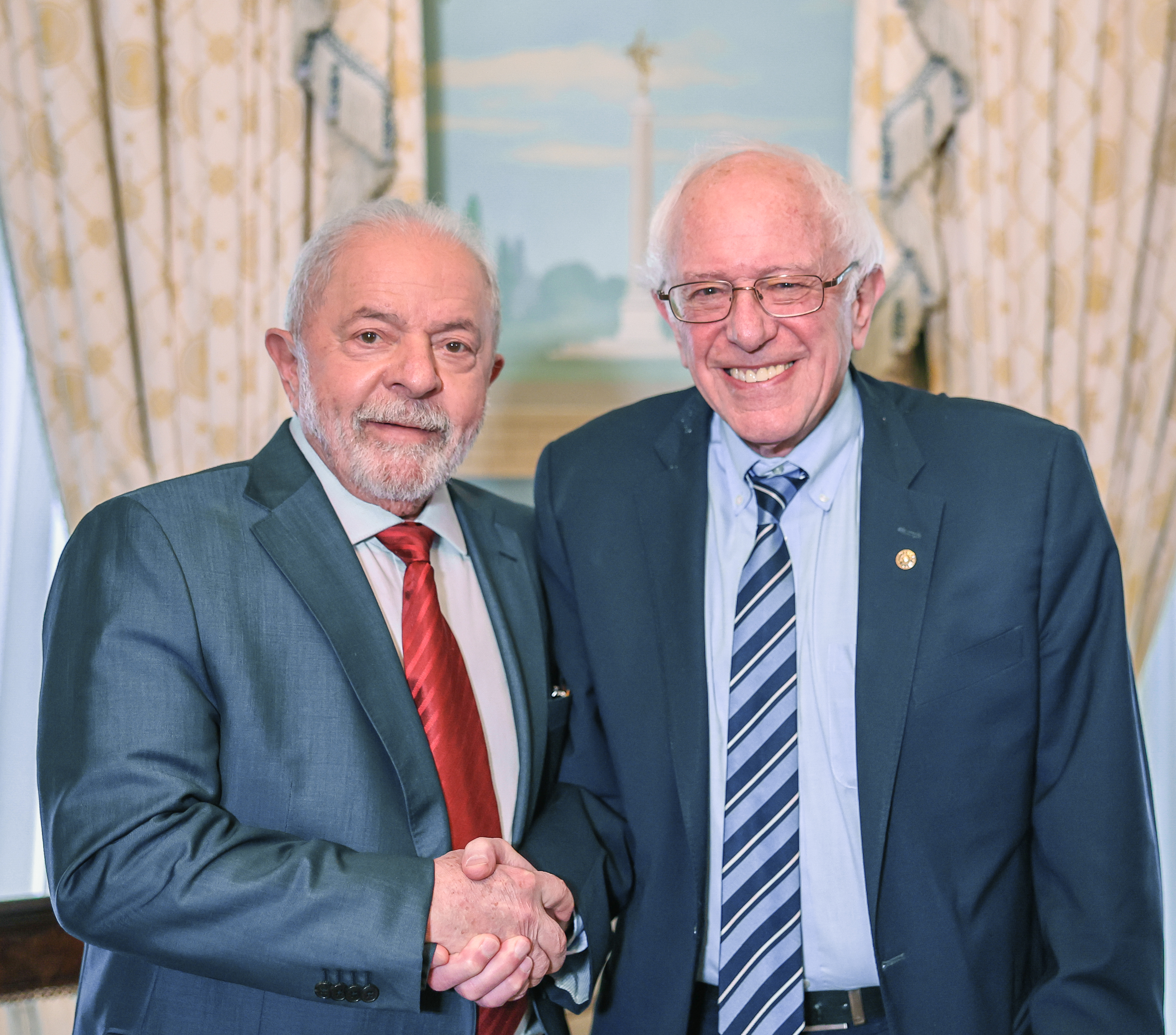
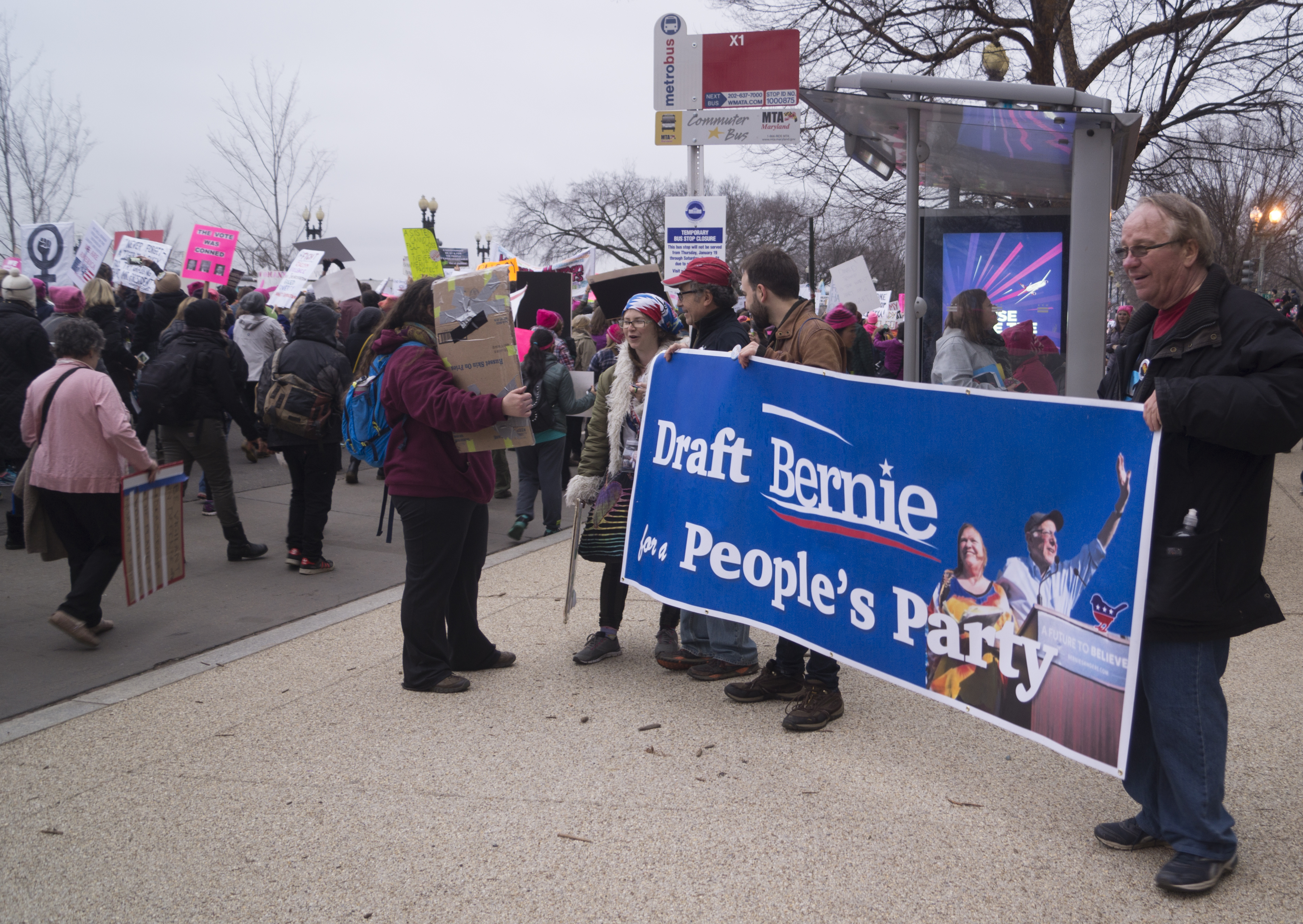
From left to right, top to bottom:
- Sanders at a Fighting Oligarchy rally in 2025
- Sanders with Alexandria Ocasio-Cortez in 2018
- Sanders with President of Brazil Luiz Inácio Lula da Silva
- "Draft Bernie" sign at the 2017 Women's March in Washington, D.C.

Bernie Sanders is an American politician who has served as a senator from Vermont since 2007. Having held various public offices since 1981, he is an independent and a self-described democratic socialist. The political practice based on the positions and rhetoric of Sanders has been colloquially referred to as Sandersism. His proposed policies emphasize reducing economic inequality and expanding social programs and workers' rights.

In 2016 Sanders campaigned for the Presidency of the United States in the Democratic primaries. Since the election, Sanders has criticized the Donald Trump presidencies. In February 2019, Sanders announced his candidacy in the Democratic Party primaries for the 2020 presidential election, later withdrawing in April 2020.

== Political and economic philosophy ==
Sanders describes himself as a democratic socialist and an admirer of aspects of Nordic social democracy, while also supporting workplace democracy in the forms of union democracy and worker cooperatives. Sanders believes that incarcerated felons should be allowed to vote while they serve their sentences.

In an address on his political philosophy given at Georgetown University in November 2015, Sanders identified his conception of "democratic socialism" with Franklin D. Roosevelt's proposal for a Second Bill of Rights, saying that democratic socialism means creating "an economy that works for all, not just the very wealthy", reforming the political system (which Sanders says is "grossly unfair" and, "in many respects, corrupt"), recognizing education and health care as rights, protecting the environment, and creating a "vibrant democracy based on the principle of one person, one vote". He explained that democratic socialism is not tied to the state socialist economic ideal, but, rather, describes a program of extensive social benefits, funded by broad-based taxes. Nevertheless, Sanders is sharply critical of contemporary neoliberal capitalism in the United States, which he describes as "uber-capitalism", blaming it for societal ills including declining life expectancy and rising diseases of despair.

=== Academics ===
Samuel Goldman, assistant professor of political science at George Washington University, suggests in The American Conservative that Sanders' platform is not socialist, and is better described as "welfarism", reminiscent of 1950s regulated capitalism. Goldman notes that Sanders does not advocate full public ownership of the means of production nor the abolition of profit, both of which Goldman considers to be defining characteristics of socialism.

Lane Kenworthy, professor of sociology at the University of California at San Diego, has argued that Sanders is a social democrat, and not a socialist, and that the two ideologies are fundamentally different from each other. Kenworthy points out that social democracy does not aim to abolish capitalism, and argues that Sanders' use of the term "socialism", when he actually advocates "social democracy", creates confusion and might have a negative impact on his presidential campaign. Mike Konczal, an economic policy expert at the Roosevelt Institute, also characterizes Sanders' positions as "social democracy", rather than "socialist", noting that social democracy means support for a mixed economy combining private enterprise with government spending, social insurance programs, Keynesian macro-economic policies, and governmental and union democracy — all of which are a part of Sanders' platform.

Andrei Markovits, professor of political science at the University of Michigan, defines democratic socialism as "an attempt to create a property-free, socialist society", and something that does not exist in Denmark or anywhere else in the world, and argues that Sanders' explanation of the term is inaccurate.

=== Socialist organizations ===
Some socialist organizations have described Sanders as a democratic socialist, market socialist, or reformist socialist, including in statements by the Democratic Socialists of America. However, many representatives belonging to the Democratic Socialists of America, Socialist Workers Party, and Socialist Party USA have criticized Sanders, arguing that he is either not a socialist because he merely aims to reform capitalism, or because he fails to fully reject the two-party system in the United States. Despite many members' criticisms, the Democratic Socialists of America "strongly support[ed]" his campaign for president. Former Sanders colleague Peter Diamondstone claimed that Sanders was a socialist during his time in the Liberty Union Party, but is no longer a socialist.

=== Other commentators ===
In 2015, The New Republic distinguished between socialism and "democratic socialism", suggesting that Sanders himself was loose with the distinction in his terminology, and that the United States already had such social democratic programs as Social Security and Medicare. Noam Chomsky, a social commentator and activist, called Sanders an "honest New Dealer". In a 2016 editorial, The Economist suggested that, despite calling himself a "democratic socialist", Sanders actually fits the mold of a "social democrat" for his embrace of "private companies that thrive and grow in America" and his belief that "the middle class and the working families who produce the wealth of America deserve a fair deal". British blogger Tim Worstall suggested that his "democratic socialism" is really social democracy, as found in much of Europe, and especially in the Nordic countries. Danish Prime Minister Lars Løkke Rasmussen of the center-right Venstre party has also disputed Sanders's portrayal of Denmark, denying that the nation is socialist and noting they have a market economy.

In 2018, The Week suggested that there was a trend towards social democracy in the United States, and highlighted the implementation of such policies in the Nordic countries, suggesting that Sanders' popularity was an element in favor of possible growth in acceptance of social democratic reforms. Johan Hassel, the international secretary for the Swedish Social Democratic Party who visited Iowa before the 2020 Iowa caucuses, compared a Sanders event to a meeting of the Left Party, the largest socialist party in Sweden, saying that "it was a mixture of very young people and old Marxists, who think they were right all along". Hassel said that he favored Pete Buttigieg over Sanders in Iowa. The Week suggested that Sanders has contributed to the confusion between democratic socialism and European social democracy.

In 2019, Matt Bruenig described Sanders as a supporter of market socialism rather than social democracy in an article for Jacobin, citing his legislative proposals and historical advocacy in favor of collective ownership of the means of production via worker-owned cooperatives and public ownership. Bruenig says that Sanders' model of socialism goes beyond stakeholder capitalism by prioritizing social ownership of capital.

In 2020, George Eaton cited Jacobin founder Bhaskar Sunkara's description of Sanders as a "class struggle social democrat" approvingly in an article for the New Statesman, arguing that the phrase "captures the nuances of Sanders' politics in a way that a socialist / social democrat binary does not" and suggesting that his proposals constituted non-reformist reforms intended to radicalise popular sentiment as elaborated by André Gorz, characterising his policy plans as being "designed for an era of extreme inequality and social polarisation, not for one of consensus and cohesion" and asserting that if he was elected president it would represent "the triumph of a politics that is neither wholly socialist, nor social democratic, but a new fusion of both".

=== Prior to elected office ===
In 1971, Sanders joined the Liberty Union Party, a socialist, anti-capitalist, and "self-described 'radical'" political party which was founded in 1970 in opposition to the Vietnam War. During his association with the party as a leading member, he advocated for nationalization of major industries, including those in the manufacturing, energy, and banking sectors. In 1974, he advocated for a marginal tax rate of 100% on income over one million dollars, saying that "Nobody should earn more than a million dollars".

While campaigning for the US Senate in 1971, he advocated for state control of Vermont public utilities in a manner that would direct surplus revenues towards social programs, and the reduction of property taxes. In 1976, he called for the state seizure, without compensation, of Vermont's private electric companies, in order to reduce the costs of their services to the consumer down to the level of governmentally run utilities. As chairman of the party in 1973, he wrote an editorial in opposition of Richard Nixon's energy policy and against oil industry profits, at a time of price increases and shortages during the OPEC oil embargo. He called for nationalization of the entire energy sector. In 1976, Sanders advocated for public ownership of utilities, banks, and major industries. He advocated for the conversion of manufacturing industries into worker-controlled enterprises, and the placement of restrictions on the ability of companies to abandon communities where they are established.

At the time of his resignation from the Liberty Union Party in October 1977, he was party chairman. Sanders quit due to the inactivity of the party between elections. In 2019, a campaign spokesman cast this record as reflecting Sanders' history of fighting "on the side of working people", and against the "influence of both the powerful ultra-rich and giant corporations who seek only to further their own greed".

== Economics ==
=== Income and wealth inequality ===
Campaign video on income inequality

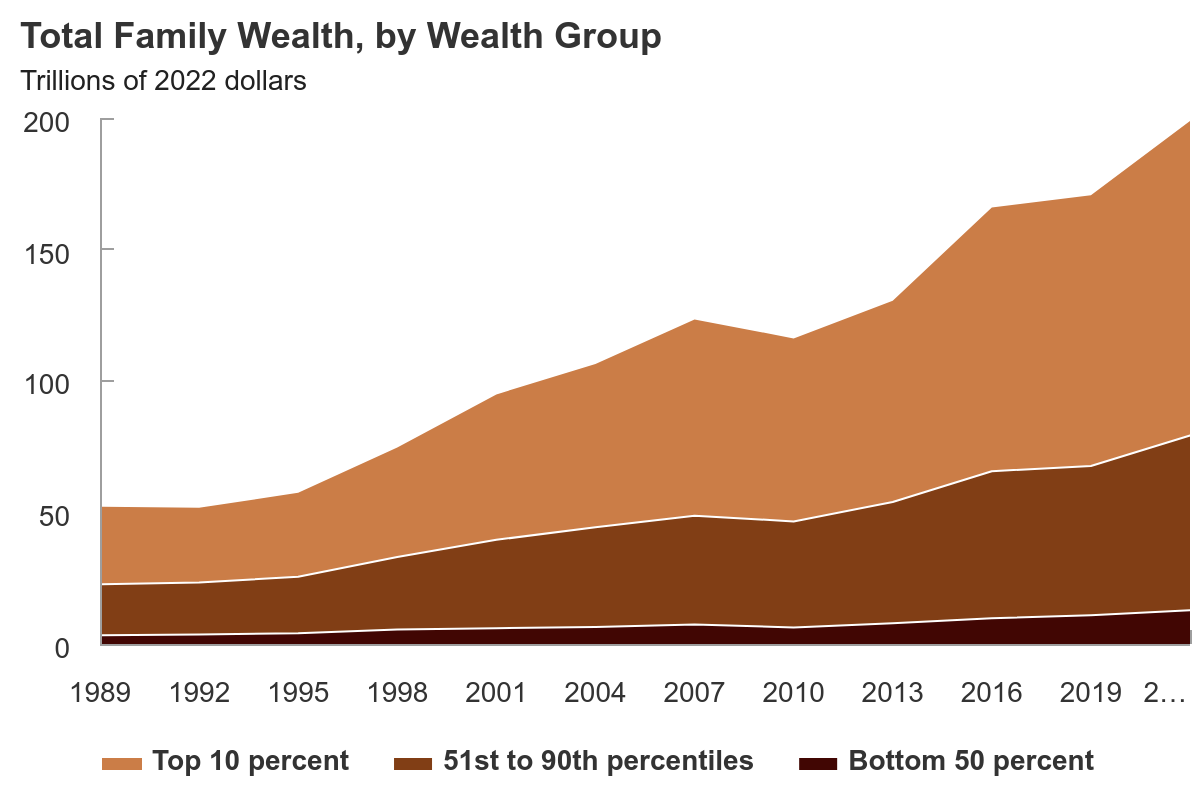
Wealth inequality in the United States increased from 1989 to 2013.

A cornerstone of Sanders's 2016 presidential campaign was to fight the increasing wealth inequality in the United States. In April 2015, Sanders articulated his position in an interview with The Guardian:

What we have seen is that while the average person is working longer hours for lower wages, we have seen a huge increase in income and wealth inequality, which is now reaching obscene levels. This is a rigged economy, which works for the rich and the powerful, and is not working for ordinary Americans ... You know, this country just does not belong to a handful of billionaires.

In July 2015, Sanders introduced legislation that would incrementally increase the federal minimum wage to $15 per hour by 2020. In 2023, Sanders called instead for a $17 minimum wage, citing inflation.

=== Taxation ===
Sanders supports repeal of some of the tax deductions that he says benefit hedge funds and corporations, and would raise taxes on capital gains and the wealthiest one percent of Americans. He would use some of the added revenues to lower the taxes of the middle and lower classes. He has suggested that he would be open to a 90% top marginal tax rate (a rate that last existed during the years after World War II) for the wealthiest earners, as well as a 52% top income tax bracket. He has proposed a top marginal rate of 65% for the federal estate tax, up from the current 40% rate.

While running for the Senate in 1974, Sanders said, "nobody should earn more than $1 million" (more than $5 million in 2018 dollars).

In 2013, President Barack Obama nominated Penny Pritzker as Secretary of Commerce, to succeed John Bryson. Pritzker was confirmed by the senate in a 97–1 vote. The sole dissenter was Sanders, who stated, "We need a Secretary of Commerce who will represent the interests of working Americans and their families, not simply the interests of CEOs and large corporations".

In February 2014, Sanders was one of 15 senators to sign a letter to the Treasury Department and IRS urging the Obama administration to implement rules that would "only close a loophole that has until now allowed donors to evade campaign finance law disclosure requirements" and defending the proposed changes as not restricting "anyone's right to speak, or to spend money to influence elections."

In 2016, Sanders wrote an op-ed to Philadelphia magazine stating that while he supported city government initiatives to fund universal pre-kindergarten education, he opposed mayor Jim Kenney's soda tax on the grounds that it would disproportionately impact the poor.

In March 2017, Sanders introduced legislation ending the ability of corporations to defer from paying taxes in the United States on their foreign earnings until the money was repatriated. The bill also had provisions that limited the tax benefits of corporate inversions and prohibiting American companies from asserting themselves as foreign companies in the event that their management and operations were based in the US. In a press conference, Sanders stated that the US had "a rigged tax code that has essentially legalized tax-dodging for large corporations."

On October 1, 2017, during an interview, Sanders referred to the Tax Cuts and Jobs Act of 2017 promoted by President Trump and most of the Congressional GOP as "just really bad policy" and furthered that he did not understand "why anybody would support a proposal which is massive amounts of tax breaks to the people who don't need it." Sanders advocated for people to instead focus on meeting the needs of the middle class and working families of this country, as opposed to "the top 1 percent."

On January 31, 2019, after Republicans introduced a bill in the Senate to repeal the estate tax, Sanders introduced an expansion of the estate tax, lowering its exemption amount and forming a progressive rate structure. In a statement, Sanders said the bill "does what the American people want by substantially increasing the estate tax on the wealthiest families in this country and dramatically reducing wealth inequality" and that the US would "not thrive when so few have so much and so many have so little."

On October 14, 2019, Sanders unveiled an economic plan that would increase the corporate tax rate from 21 percent to 35 percent and mandate companies that either are publicly traded or have at least $100 million in either their annual revenue or balance sheet total grant workers 2 percent of the company's stock until employees own a minimum of 20 percent of the company. The Sanders campaign stated that the economic plan would "give workers an ownership stake in the companies they work for, break up corrupt corporate mergers and monopolies, and finally make corporations pay their fair share" and asserted that a Sanders presidency would end what he believes is corporate greed ruining the United States "once and for all".

In March 2022, Sanders proposed to deal with price gouging exacerbating the ongoing inflation crisis by imposing a 95 percent windfall tax through 2024, similar to the windfall tax on corporations implemented in the United States during World War II.

=== Wall Street reform ===
On May 6, 2015, Sanders introduced legislation designed to break up "too big to fail" financial institutions. With three of the four banks that were bailed out during the 2008 financial crisis now larger than they were then, Sanders believes that "no single financial institution should have holdings so extensive that its failure would send the world economy into crisis. If an institution is too big to fail, it is too big to exist." As a representative from Vermont, Sanders opposed the Gramm–Leach–Bliley Act, signed in 1999 by President Bill Clinton, which repealed the provision of the Glass–Steagall Act preventing any financial institution from acting as both a securities firm and a commercial bank. Sanders supports legislation sponsored by Senators Elizabeth Warren (D-MA) and John McCain (R-AZ) to reinstate Glass–Steagall.

=== Infrastructure and industrial policy ===
In his "Plan to Rebuild America", the January 27, 2015, legislative proposal he co-sponsored with Sen. Barbara Mikulski (D-MD), the ranking member of the appropriations committee, and backed by the American Society of Civil Engineers, the AFL–CIO and other trade unions, Sanders insisted on the pivotal role played by infrastructure investments:

For too many years, we have dramatically underfunded the physical infrastructure that our economy depends on. That is why I have proposed the Rebuild America Act, to invest $1 trillion over five years to modernize our infrastructure. [...] Importantly, the Rebuild America Act will support more than thirteen million good-paying jobs – jobs that our economy desperately needs.

While clearly rooted in the Rooseveltian, progressive tradition, this policy proposal also reflects more generally the pre-Reagan Era bipartisan American policy consensus, which was more favorable to the notion of infrastructure spending and infrastructure-driven development.

In June 2019, Sanders was one of eight senators to sponsor the Made in America Act, legislation that would designate federal programs which had funded infrastructure projects not currently subject to Buy America standards and mandate the materials used in these federal programs were domestically produced. Bill cosponsor Tammy Baldwin said the bill would strengthen Buy America requirements of the federal government and that she was hopeful both Democrats and Republicans would support "this effort to make sure our government is buying American products and supporting American workers."

On June 20, 2021, Sanders stated that he would not support paying for the Infrastructure Investment and Jobs Act, which would spend over $1.2 trillion on roads, bridges, broadband, passenger rail, a new entity called ARPA-I, and the hydrogen economy, among others, via a proposed gas tax or a surcharge on electric vehicles. He voted for the IIJA.

In 2022, Sanders denounced the CHIPS and Science Act, which gives $174 billion to public basic research and $106 billion to semiconductor firms, as a corporate welfare-centric "blank check" bill. He voted against the bill.

Over the next month, Sanders supported the Inflation Reduction Act, a reconciliation bill projected to increase investments in clean energy, battery storage, sustainable agriculture and transportation, green banks, and a variety of other green industrial policy measures through spending and tax credits totaling between $369 billion and $1.2 trillion, as well as expand subsidies for the Affordable Care Act and negotiations for drug prices to Medicare, in exchange for a new minimum corporate income tax and improved IRS funding. He voted in favor of the bill.

=== Trade ===
In 1993 Sanders spoke out against the North American Free Trade Agreement (NAFTA). According to PolitiFact, Sanders has "consistently argued for protectionist trade policies as opposed to free trade." Sanders opposes the Trans-Pacific Partnership trade agreement, which he has called "a continuation of other disastrous trade agreements, like NAFTA, CAFTA, and permanent normal trade relations with China." He believes that free trade agreements have caused a loss of American jobs and have depressed American wages. Sanders has said that America needs to rebuild its own manufacturing base by using American factories and supporting well-paying jobs for American labor rather than outsourcing to China and other countries.

According to Sanders, TPP undermines United States sovereignty: TPP grants multinational corporations power to sue a national government in UN and World Bank tribunals over lost profits (including those yet to be made) due to the regulations about labor, health and environment that the government imposed. The tribunals can require US taxpayers to pay compensation. In September 2016, Sanders was one of twelve senators to sign a letter to President Obama asserting that the passage of the Trans-Pacific Partnership "in its current form will perpetuate a trade policy that advantages corporations at the expense of American workers" and there would be an "erosion of U.S. manufacturing and middle class jobs, and accelerate the corporate race to the bottom" if provisions were not fixed.

Sanders opposed the Panama Free Trade Agreement, which he characterized as making worse the tax evasion exposed in leaked Panama Papers.

In May 2011, Sanders was one of seventeen senators to sign a letter to Commodity Futures Trading Commission Chairman Gary Gensler requesting a regulatory crackdown on what they described as speculative Wall Street trading in oil contracts, asserting that they had entered "a time of economic emergency for many American families" while noting that the average retail price of regular grade gasoline was $3.95 nationwide. The senators requested that the CFTC adopt speculation limits in regard to markets where contracts for future delivery of oil are traded.

On November 30, 2018, Sanders announced his opposition to the United States–Mexico–Canada Agreement, saying "a re-negotiated NAFTA must stop the outsourcing of U.S. jobs, end the destructive race to the bottom, protect the environment, and lower the outrageously high price of prescription drugs" and that corporations would persist in shipping "U.S. jobs to Mexico where workers are paid as little as $2 an hour" until the agreement's text was revised to include "strong enforcement mechanisms".

=== Position on charities ===
In 1981, when Sanders was Mayor of Burlington, Vermont, The New York Times quoted his position on private charitable organizations:

"I don't believe in charities," said Mayor Sanders, bringing a shocked silence to a packed hotel banquet room. The Mayor, who is a Socialist, went on to question the "fundamental concepts on which charities are based" and contended that government, rather than charity organizations, should take over responsibility for social programs.

=== Jobs ===
Sanders was committed to creating job growth through infrastructure development and manufacturing, saying, "America once led the world in building and maintaining a nationwide network of safe and reliable bridges and roads. Today, nearly a quarter of the nation's 600,000 bridges have been designated as structurally deficient or functionally obsolete ... Almost one-third of America's major roads are in poor or mediocre condition ..." Sanders has introduced amendments to Senate bills (S.Amendt.323) promoting the creation of millions of middle-class jobs by investing in infrastructure, paid for by closing what he characterizes as loopholes in the corporate and international tax system. He also supports legislation that would make it easier for workers to join or form a labor union. Sanders' campaign website also has focused on the concerns of both the long-term unemployed and the underemployed, contending that "the real unemployment rate is much higher than the 'official' figure typically reported in the newspapers. When you include workers who have given up looking for jobs, or those who are working part-time when they want to work full-time, the real number is much higher than official figures would suggest."

Sanders also supports a federal jobs guarantee.

Sanders has said that there is a very important role for free enterprise and economic growth, especially for small business and entrepreneurs, but that the competitive landscape in the US has become unfair, favoring large corporations. He has also said that economic growth needs to serve people and that growth for the sake of enriching the top 1% does not serve the country's interests. He has said that he would accept a reduction in economic growth in order to increase fairness and reduce economic inequality.

=== Employee ownership and workplace democracy ===
Sanders supports establishing worker-owned cooperatives and sponsored legislation numerous times from the 1990s to the 2020s that would aid workers who wanted to "form their own businesses or to set up worker-owned cooperatives." As early as 1976, Sanders proposed workplace democracy, saying, "I believe that, in the long run, major industries in this state and nation should be publicly owned and controlled by the workers themselves." Likewise, Sanders supports empowering and expanding labor unions to advance union democracy.

In 1987, Sanders defined democracy as public ownership and workers' self-management in the workplace, stating that "Democracy means public ownership of the major means of production, it means decentralization, it means involving people in their work. Rather than having bosses and workers it means having democratic control over the factories and shops to as great a degree as you can."

In his 2020 run for president, Sanders proposed that 20% of stocks in corporations with over $100 million in annual revenue be owned by the corporation's workers. In addition, he proposed that 45% of the board of directors of corporations with over $100 million in annual revenue be elected by the workers of that corporation.

=== Offshore tax havens ===
Noting that American corporations are collectively holding more than $1 trillion in profits in offshore tax haven countries, Sanders has introduced legislation that would crack down on offshore tax havens by requiring companies to pay the top U.S. corporate tax rate on profits held abroad. On his website, Sanders offers examples of large American companies that paid no federal taxes and even received tax refunds, with many of them receiving large amounts in financial assistance during the 2008 financial crisis and continuing to receive billions in subsidies. Sanders feels that this is unfair and that it damages the nation's economy, believing the money used for refunds and subsidies should instead be invested in American small businesses and the working people.

=== Federal Reserve ===
Sanders is in favor of auditing the Federal Reserve, which would reduce the independence of the Federal Reserve in monetary policy deliberations; Federal Reserve officials say that 'Audit the Fed' legislation would expose the Federal Reserve to undue political pressure from lawmakers disliking its decisions. Nobel Memorial Prize-winning economist Paul Krugman said that "such a bill would essentially empower the cranks — the gold-standard-loving, hyperinflation-is-coming types who dominate the modern G.O.P., and have spent the past five or six years trying to bully monetary policy makers into ceasing and desisting from their efforts to prevent economic disaster."

In a December 2015 op-ed, Sanders called for creating board positions on the Federal Reserve for "representatives from all walks of life — including labor, consumers, homeowners, urban residents, farmers and small businesses."

=== Debt relief ===
In June 2016, after Senate Majority Leader Mitch McConnell announced an agreement on a Puerto Rico debt relief bill, Sanders said the bill was a "terrible piece of legislation, setting horrific precedent and must not be passed" and stated his opposition to the US treating Puerto Rico "like a colony."

=== Minimum wage ===
In May 2017, Sanders and 30 Democratic senators introduced a bill increasing the federal minimum wage from $7.25 to $15 by 2024 while also tying future increases to national median wage growth and gradually reducing the current exception to the minimum wage in regard to tipped workers. Sanders stated, "Just a few short years ago, we were told that raising the minimum wage to $15 an hour was 'radical'. Our job in the wealthiest country in the history of the world is to make sure that every worker has at least a modest and decent standard of living."

In January 2019, Sanders sponsored the Senate version of a bill to increase the federal minimum wage to $15 per hour by 2024, saying, "We are living today in an American economy that is doing very well for the people on top. Not so well for working families."

In 2023, Sanders called for a $17 minimum wage, citing inflation.

=== Labor ===
In May 2018, Sanders was one of twelve senators to sign a letter to Chairman of the Federal Labor Relations Authority Colleen Kiko urging the FLRA to end efforts to close its Boston regional office until Congress debated the matter, furthering that the FLRA closing down its seven regional offices would cause staff to be placed farther away from the federal employees they protect the rights of.

Sanders was a cosponsor of the Employee Free Choice Act.

In July 2019, Sanders signed a letter to Secretary of Labor Alexander Acosta that advocated for the U.S. Occupational Safety and Health Administration to initiate a full investigation into a complaint filed on May 20 by a group of Chicago-area employees of McDonald's, which detailed workplace violence incidents that included interactions with customers such as customers throwing hot coffee and threatening employees with firearms and more. The senators argued that McDonald's could and needed to "do more to protect its employees, but employers will not take seriously their obligations to provide a safe workplace if OSHA does not enforce workers rights to a hazard-free workplace."

In 2023, Sanders wrote an op-ed for The Guardian in support of a potential strike of United Auto Workers members against General Motors, Ford Motor Company and Stellantis, saying that "their fight against corporate greed is our fight. Their victory will resonate all across the economy, impact millions of workers from coast to coast and help create a more just and equitable economy."

=== Anti-trust, competition, and corporate regulation ===
In July 2018, in response to Comcast's $65 billion bid to buy much of 21st Century Fox, Sanders was one of four senators to sign a letter to the head of the Justice Department's anti-trust division, Makan Delrahim, requesting a review on whether Comcast would be able to use Fox's entertainment offerings to suppress its competitors, noting "that the merger would provide a majority stake in the streaming service Hulu" and citing the "need to protect consumers from the harmful effects of the proposed merger, evident in the numerous settlements with Comcast regarding past anti-competitive practices, such as the use of channel listings to prioritize its content over that of outside competitors and over-billing of customers".

In February 2019, Sanders was one of eight senators to sign a letter to the Federal Communications Commission and Department of Justice, advocating for regulators to renounce a proposed $26 billion merger between T-Mobile and Sprint, writing that American enforcers have understood for the last thirty years "that fostering robust competition in telecommunications markets is the best way to provide every American with access to high-quality, cutting-edge communications at a reasonable price", and the merger would result in a return for "Americans to the dark days of heavily consolidated markets and less competition, with all of the resulting harms".

In May 2019, Sanders and Representative Barbara Lee introduced the Inclusive Prosperity Act, imposing a "fraction of a percent" tax on stock, bond, and derivatives trading, estimated to generate 2.4 trillion from Wall Street investors over a 10-year period. Sanders stated the effects of the Tax Cuts and Jobs Act of 2017 on Americans of varying classes, and asserted that it was "long past time for Congress to rein in the recklessness of Wall Street billionaires and build an economy that works for all Americans".

In June 2019, Sanders was one of 21 senators to sign a letter, led by Bob Menendez and Sherrod Brown, to the Consumer Financial Protection Bureau (CFPB), in response to a proposed update to the Fair Debt Collection Practices Act that would authorize debt collectors to send unlimited texts and e-mails to consumers, along with calling them up to seven times a day. The senators wrote that the proposed update "permits collectors to overwhelm consumers with intrusive communications", and that the CFPB was "placing the cost burden of these text messages on the consumer", due to not enforcing the debt collectors to use free-to-end-user text messaging.

In June 2019, along with fellow senators Cory Booker and Elizabeth Warren, Sanders sent a letter to the Federal Communications Commission (FCC) and Department of Justice, requesting an investigation into the acquisition of 21 regional sports networks by Sinclair Broadcast Group, as the senators found Sinclair to have "an explicit interest in, and commitment to, relaying partisan political messages to its viewers — making its recent anti-competitive expansion attempts into millions of additional households all the more concerning".

In a June 2019 speech, Sanders accused Trump of loving "corporate socialism".

=== Price controls ===
In April 2013, Sanders was one of 19 senators to sign a brief led by Carl Levin requesting the U.S. Circuit Court of Appeals for the District of Columbia overturn a 2012 federal district court ruling effectively invalidates proposed federal regulations setting speculation limits on 28 commodities, arguing rampant speculation on the aforementioned commodities had led to higher prices for both consumers and businesses.

=== Housing ===
In April 2019, Sanders was one of 41 senators to sign a bipartisan letter to the housing subcommittee praising the United States Department of Housing and Urban Development's Section 4 Capacity Building program as authorizing "HUD to partner with national nonprofit community development organizations to provide education, training, and financial support to local community development corporations (CDCs) across the country" and expressing disappointment that President Trump's budget "has slated this program for elimination after decades of successful economic and community development." The senators wrote of their hope that the subcommittee would support continued funding for Section 4 in Fiscal Year 2020.

Sanders' 2020 campaign platform included calls to spend $2.5 trillion on building nearly 10 million affordable housing units and $70 billion for repairing existing public housing units, fully fund the Section 8 voucher program, implement national rent control forbidding increases of more than 3 percent or 1.5 times inflation, increase enforcement of the Fair Housing Act of 1968, reform tenant protections against eviction in the United States, end exclusionary zoning, speed up home energy upgrades from public utilities, end homelessness in the United States, and create an expansive relief program for homeowners still suffering from the 2008 financial crisis, among other provisions.

=== Government shutdown ===
In March 2019, Sanders and 38 other senators signed a letter to the Appropriations Committee opining that contractor workers and by extension their families "should not be penalized for a government shutdown that they did nothing to cause" while noting that there were bills in both chambers of Congress that if enacted would provide back pay to compensate contractor employees for lost wages before urging the Appropriations Committee "to include back pay for contractor employees in a supplemental appropriations bill for FY2019 or as part of the regular appropriations process for FY2020."

=== Fiscal Responsibility Act of 2023 ===
Sanders joined four Democrats in voting against final passage of the Fiscal Responsibility Act of 2023 in the Senate.

=== Artificial intelligence ===
In October 2025, Sanders raised concerns about job displacement due to artificial intelligence (AI), citing a report that estimated potential job losses of up to 100 million over the next decade. He proposed a "robot tax" that would protect workers from the impacts of artificial intelligence. In June 2026, Sanders proposed legislation to create a sovereign wealth fund by requiring companies with over $200 million in annual AI sales to make a one-time 50% stock transfer to the fund.

In September 2026, Sanders and Representative Greg Casar (D-Texas) introduced the "Ban Artificial Superintelligence Act" to the Senate in response to perceived existential risk from artificial intelligence. The proposed bill would ban the development of AI which exceeds most human abilities, and would pause development of advanced AI models until a new government agency is created which would monitor AI companies and enforce AI safety legislation.

== Environment ==
=== Global warming ===
Campaign video on climate change

Sanders views global warming as a serious problem. Along with Senator Barbara Boxer, Sanders introduced the Global Warming Pollution Reduction Act of 2007 on January 15, 2007. In a July 26, 2012, speech on the Senate floor, Sanders addressed claims made by Senator Jim Inhofe: "The bottom line is when Senator Inhofe says global warming is a hoax, he is just dead wrong, according to the vast majority of climate scientists." He was Climate Hawks Vote's top-rated senator on climate leadership in the 113th Congress.

Believing that "[we need to] transform our energy system away from fossil fuel", Sanders voted against the Keystone Pipeline bill, saying: "Unless we get our act together, the planet that we're going to be leaving to our kids and grandchildren will be significantly less habitable than the planet we have right now ... I think it's a good idea for the president, Congress, and the American people to listen to the overwhelming amount of scientists who tell us loudly and clearly that climate change is one of the great planetary crises that we face."

Sanders also stands with the Great Sioux Nation, as opposed to constructing the Dakota Access Pipeline, stating:

Like the Keystone XL pipeline, which I opposed since day one, the Dakota Access fracked oil pipeline, will transport some of the dirtiest fuel on the planet. Regardless of the court's decision, the Dakota Access pipeline must be stopped. As a nation, our job is to break our addiction to fossil fuels, not increase our dependence on oil. I join with the Standing Rock Sioux Tribe and the many tribal nations fighting this dangerous pipeline.

In April 2015, Sanders was one of five senators to sign a letter to American governors, saying the climate change views of Senate Majority Leader Mitch McConnell were not in line with that of Kentuckians and urging them to comply with the Obama administration's Clean Power Plan.

In April 2017, along with Stanford University professor Mark Z. Jacobson, Sanders wrote an op-ed for The Guardian on the need for the US to "aggressively transition our energy system away from fossil fuels and toward clean, renewable energy solutions", citing climate change as already having caused "severe weather events like prolonged droughts, record-high temperatures, and rising sea levels because of melting Arctic sea ice". Sanders and Jacobson also warned that "the people who had least to do with causing the problem will be impacted the most, including low-income families and communities of color across America".

In February 2019, in response to reports of the EPA intending to decide against setting drinking water limits for Perfluorooctanesulfonic acid (PFOS) and Perfluorooctanoic acid (PFOA) as part of an upcoming national strategy to manage the aforementioned class of chemicals, Sanders was one of twenty senators to sign a letter to Acting EPA Administrator Andrew R. Wheeler, calling on the agency "to develop enforceable federal drinking water standards for PFOA and PFOS, as well as institute immediate actions to protect the public from contamination from additional per- and polyfluoroalkyl substances (PFAS)".

In June 2019, Sanders was one of 44 senators to introduce the International Climate Accountability Act, legislation that would prevent President Trump from using funds in an attempt to withdraw from the Paris Agreement, and directing the president's administration to instead develop a strategic plan for the United States that would allow it to meet its commitment under the Paris Agreement.

On August 22, 2019, Sanders unveiled a $16.3 trillion climate change plan that called for a transformation of the United States energy system that would allow for it to transition to relying entirely on renewable energy for both electricity and transportation by 2030, and complete de-carbonization by 2050. The plan would also invest $40 billion in a Climate Justice Resiliency Fund intended to help "under-resourced groups, communities of color, Native Americans, people with disabilities, children, and the elderly recover from and prepare for the impacts of climate change". Sanders committed to declaring climate change a national emergency and re-joining the Paris Agreement if elected president, citing the climate crisis as "not only the single greatest challenge facing our country; it is also our single greatest opportunity to build a more just and equitable future, but we must act immediately".

During a September 2019 CNN town hall on climate change in which Sanders participated, there was an exchange with an audience member who said: "Human population growth has more than doubled in the past 50 years. The planet cannot sustain this growth. I realize this is a poisonous topic for politicians, but it's crucial to face. Empowering women and educating everyone on the need to curb population growth seems a reasonable campaign to enact. Would you be courageous enough to discuss this issue and make it a key feature of a plan to address climate catastrophe?" Sanders responded:

The answer is yes. And the answer has everything to do with the fact that women in the United States of America, by the way, have a right to control their own bodies and make reproductive decisions. And the Mexico City agreement, which denies American aid to those organizations around the world that allow women to have abortions or even get involved in birth control, to me, is totally absurd. So, I think especially in poor countries around the world, where women do not necessarily want to have large numbers of babies, and where they can have the opportunity, through birth control, to control the number of kids they have, is something I very, very strongly support.

=== Carbon tax ===
Prior to his 2020 presidential campaign, Sanders had long been a proponent of a carbon tax as a means to reduce carbon emissions. In 2014, Sanders suggested that a carbon tax "must be a central part of [the US's] strategy for dramatically reducing carbon pollution." In the 2016 election, Sanders differentiated himself from primary opponent Hillary Clinton via his support for a carbon tax. However, during the 2020 election, Sanders has chosen to remain silent on the issue of carbon taxation, instead preferring to emphasize the Green New Deal. In 2019, The Intercept described Sanders' position on carbon taxation as "not yet clear".

=== Nuclear energy ===
Following the 2011 Japanese nuclear accidents, Sanders called for a moratorium on licensing new nuclear plants and re-licensing of existing ones, in an effort to slow down what has been touted as a nuclear renaissance in the United States. Sanders wrote to President Obama, asking him to appoint a special commission to review the safety of U.S. nuclear plants. Sanders also wants to repeal the Price–Anderson Act, which leaves the taxpayers to pay most of the costs of a major nuclear accident. He says, "in a free-enterprise system, the nuclear industry should be required to insure itself against accidents."

Sanders has gone on record against the government financial backing of the nuclear industry, which he calls "nuclear welfare". Additionally, he expresses concern over the logistics and fiscal challenges of nuclear waste. He has spoken in favor of sustainable alternatives and cites Vermont as a state leading such endeavors, saying in regard to opposition of the Nuclear Regulatory Commission's 2011 extension (just one week after the Japanese accidents) of the Vermont Yankee Nuclear Power Plant's operating license, "In my state there is a strong feeling that we want to go forward with energy efficiency and sustainable energy. I believe that we have that right. I believe that every other state in the country has that right. If we want to move to sustainable energy and not maintain an aging, trouble-plagued nuclear power plant, I think we should be allowed to do that."

In July 2019, Sanders was an original cosponsor of the Sensible, Timely Relief for America's Nuclear Districts' Economic Development (STRANDED) Act, a bipartisan bill introduced by Susan Collins and Tammy Duckworth that would give economic impact grants to local government entities for the purpose of offsetting economic impacts of stranded nuclear waste in addition to forming a task force that would identify funding which already exists that could be used to benefit its respective community and form a competitive innovative solutions prize competition to aid those communities in their search for alternatives to "nuclear facilities, generating sites, and waste sites."

=== Pipelines ===
At a September 2016 rally near the White House, Sanders called on President Obama to ensure the Dakota Access Pipeline "gets a full environmental and cultural impact analysis" and stated his position that the pipeline would not continue in the event of such an analysis taking place, citing findings by Oil Change International that the Dakota Access Pipeline would have the same impact on the planet as adding 21 million more cars on the road along with constructing 30 more coal plants.

In October 2016, Sanders led four senators in a letter to President Obama requesting the administration halt work on the Dakota Access Pipeline until the permitting process of the Army Corps "be transparent and include public notice and participation, formal and meaningful tribal consultation, and adequate environmental review" and stating their support for the "tribes along the pipeline route in their fight against the Dakota Access pipeline project."

In December 2016, following the United States Army Corps of Engineers's block on the Dakota Access Pipeline, Sanders released a statement praising President Obama for listening to Native Americans as well as others opposed to the pipeline's construction and said the United States should neither "endanger the water supply of millions of people" nor "become more dependent on fossil fuel and accelerate the planetary crisis of climate change." He called for a transformation of the American energy system that would see a departure from the usage of fossil fuels.

Following a spill at the Keystone pipeline in October 2019, Sanders said he would shut down the existing Keystone pipeline if elected.

== Transparency and corruption ==
=== Campaign finance ===
Sanders supports the DISCLOSE Act, which would make campaign finances more transparent and ban U.S. corporations controlled by foreign interests from making political expenditures. He has been outspoken in calling for an overturn of Citizens United v. Federal Election Commission, in which the Supreme Court overturned McCain–Feingold restrictions on political spending by corporations and unions as a violation of the First Amendment. Saying that he believes that the Citizens United decision is "one of the Supreme Court's worst decisions ever" and that it has allowed big money to "deflect attention from the real issues" facing voters, he has proposed a constitutional amendment to undo the ruling. He warns: "We now have a political situation where billionaires are literally able to buy elections and candidates."

In January 2016, Sanders was one of 29 senators to sign a letter spearheaded by Ron Wyden and Sheldon Whitehouse to President Obama urging him to issue a final executive order that would require federal contractors to disclose political donations, arguing that form of disclosure was "a modest step that would expose an especially troubling type of secret money: campaign contributions that have the potential to influence government contracting practices."

In October 2016, while stumping for Democratic nominee Hillary Clinton, Sanders advocated for Trump supporters to vote for Clinton due to her promise to propose a constitutional amendment in the first 100 days of her presidency to overturn Citizens United v. Federal Election Commission as well as her intent to nominate a Supreme Court justice to fill the vacancy by the late Antonin Scalia that would support overturning Citizens United v. Federal Election Commission: "This issue of Citizens United is a profound issue impacting the entire country. I say to Mr. Trump's supporters: most of you understand that system is rigged in favor of wealthy and power."

=== Instant-runoff voting ===
In 2007, Sanders testified to the Vermont Senate Government Operations Committee that he "strongly supports instant-runoff voting" because it "allows people to vote for what they really want, without worrying about the possibility of them getting what they really don't want". The committee and legislature ultimately passed legislation that would have enacted instant run-off voting for U.S. Representatives and U.S. Senators, but the governor vetoed it.

=== Criticism of the media ===
In an early essay, Sanders claimed that the corporate owners of the television industry sought to benumb critical thinking among their viewers. Later he bemoaned the media's emphasis on reporting disasters, while ignoring what he characterizes as the plight of the working class. Consequently, he has been a leader in calling for media reform and opposes increased concentration of ownership of media outlets, as well as being a contributing author for OpEdNews. He appeared in Orwell Rolls in His Grave and Outfoxed: Rupert Murdoch's War on Journalism, two documentaries on the subject.

=== Internet privacy ===
In April 2017, after President Trump signed a law undoing a Federal Communications Commission rule requiring internet service providers to obtain permission from customers prior to selling their data to advertisers, Sanders was one of eleven senators to sponsor legislation undoing the repeal and reinstating the regulations. Sanders voiced support for penalizing companies that neglect to protect their users' personal data, specifically citing the 2017 Equifax data breach.

Sanders has also proposed creating a public, secure credit registry to replace the current credit reporting system.

=== Net neutrality ===
Sanders opposes the repeal of net neutrality in the United States, as voted by FCC commissioners in a 3–2 vote on December 14, 2017 — his statement on the issue from his U.S. Senate website on the same day as the vote, partly reads: "The FCC's vote to end net neutrality is an egregious attack on our democracy. With this decision the internet and its free exchange of information as we have come to know it will cease to exist ... At a time when our democratic institutions are already in peril, we must do everything we can to stop this decision from taking effect."

In May 2014, days before the FCC was scheduled to rewrite its net neutrality rules, Sanders was one of eleven senators to sign a letter to FCC Chairman Tom Wheeler charging Wheeler's proposal with destroying net neutrality instead of preserving it and urged the FCC to "consider reclassifying Internet providers to make them more like traditional phone companies, over which the agency has clear authority to regulate more broadly."

In March 2018, Sanders was one of 10 senators to sign a letter spearheaded by Jeff Merkley which lambasted a proposal from FCC Chairman Ajit Pai that would curb the scope of benefits from the Lifeline program, which provided access to high-speed internet to roughly 6.5 million people in poor communities, citing that it was Pai's "obligation to the American public, as the Chairman of the Federal Communications Commission, to improve the Lifeline program and ensure that more Americans can afford access, and have means of access, to broadband and phone service".

In May 2018, Sanders voted for a bill that would reinstate net neutrality rules and thereby overturn the FCC's repeal via a law authorizing Congress to reverse regulatory actions by a simple majority vote.

== Foreign policy ==
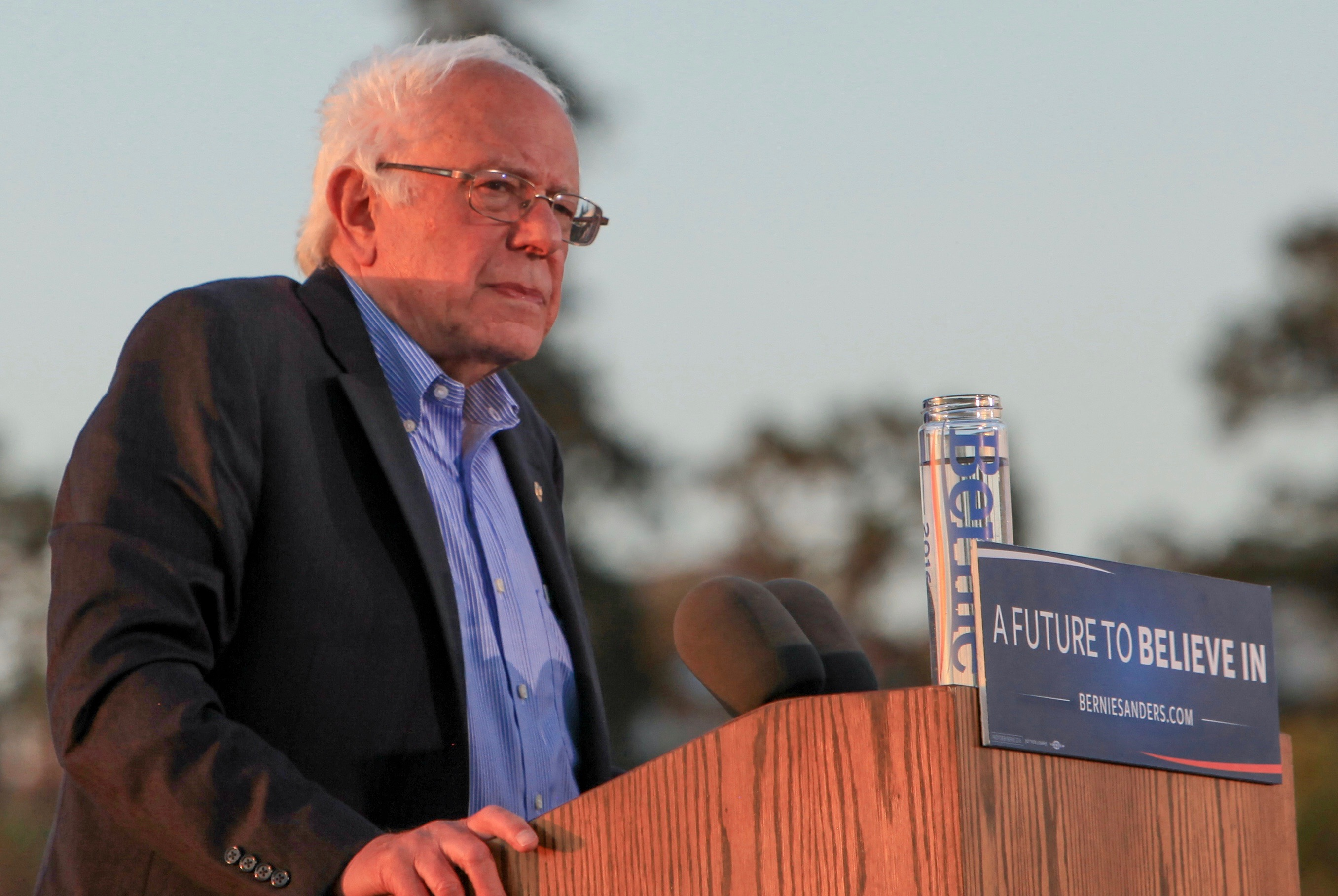
Sanders at a May 2016 rally in Vallejo, California

=== Afghanistan ===
Sanders voted for the 2001 Authorization for Use of Military Force Against Terrorists that has been cited as the legal justification for controversial military actions since the September 11 attacks. In February 2011, Sanders traveled to Afghanistan and Pakistan with fellow senators Bob Corker, Chris Coons, and Joe Manchin, opining afterward that Afghanistan was "one of the most backward countries in the entire world", given its massive poverty, lack of literacy, and corruption. He stated his belief that the US could afford to reduce its funding for the American and Afghanistan armed forces, Afghanistan police, and Afghanistan's economic development. Sanders said in 2019 that Barbara Lee, the sole "no" vote on the 2001 AUMF, was correct to do so. By 2009, Sanders stated that the war was "unwinnable", voted against funding for it, and opposed sending more troops.

In 2019, Sanders was one of eight lawmakers to sign a pledge by grass-roots organization Common Defense stating their intent "to fight to reclaim Congress's constitutional authority to conduct oversight of U.S. foreign policy and independently debate whether to authorize each new use of military force", along with acting toward bringing "the Forever War to a responsible and expedient conclusion", after seventeen years of ongoing US military conflict.

In June 2019, Sanders told The New York Times that "by the end of my first term, I think our troops would be home". In September, a campaign spokesman indicated to The Washington Post that this did not rule out leaving residual forces.

In September 2021, after a drone strike accidentally killed 10 civilians, Sanders called the incident "a human tragedy" that reflected on the US and "unacceptable".

=== Balkans ===
Sanders supported the 1999 NATO bombing of Yugoslavia, arguing that while aspects of the Clinton administration's military push to resolve ethnic tensions in Kosovo bordered on unconstitutional, such a push was necessary to prevent genocide in the region. Regarding the level of influence Congress needed to have in approving the bombing, he preferred the administration's recommendation that the bombing not be subject to the War Powers Resolution of 1973, and opposed an explicit declaration of war by the United States proposed by then-Representative Tom Campbell.

During the Greek government-debt crisis, Sanders opposed fiscal austerity measures, and called on the European Central Bank, European Commission, and International Monetary Fund to back "pro-growth" economic stimulus policies. In November 2018, Sanders and former Greek finance minister Yanis Varoufakis reiterated their opposition to austerity before launching the Progressive International movement at an event in Rome.

=== Central America ===
In April 2019, Sanders was one of 34 senators to sign a letter to President Trump encouraging him "to listen to members of your own Administration and reverse a decision that will damage our national security and aggravate conditions inside Central America", asserting that Trump had "consistently expressed a flawed understanding of U.S. foreign assistance" since becoming president, and that he was "personally undermining efforts to promote U.S. national security and economic prosperity" through preventing the use of Fiscal Year 2018 national security funding. The senators argued that foreign assistance to Central American countries created less migration to the U.S., citing the funding's helping to improve conditions in those countries.

=== Cuba ===
On April 14, 2015, after the White House announced that President Obama had intended to remove Cuba from the United States' list of nations sponsoring terrorism, Sanders issued a statement, saying: "While we have our strong differences with Cuba, it is not a terrorist state. I applaud President Obama for moving aggressively to develop normal diplomatic relations. Fifty years of Cold War is enough. It is time for Cuba and the United States to turn the page and normalize relations."

=== China ===
On May 1, 2019, Sanders tweeted: "Since the China trade deal I voted against, America has lost over 3 million manufacturing jobs. It's wrong to pretend that China isn't one of our major economic competitors."

On August 27, 2019, Sanders told The Hill: "China is a country that is moving unfortunately in a more authoritarian way in a number of directions. What we have to say about China, in fairness to China and its leadership, is – if I'm not mistaken – they have made more progress in addressing extreme poverty than any country in the history of civilization. So they've done a lot of things for their people."

On December 6, 2019, Sanders spoke concerning the Xinjiang re-education camps, telling the DesMoines Register: "What we should be doing with China is understanding they are a super-power, they are a strong economy. We want to be working with them. We certainly don't want a Cold War. But we should be speaking out against human rights abuses. When you put into concentration camps, you know, or at least lock up, I don't know, a million Muslims there, somebody's got to speak out about that."

On January 7, 2020, Sanders mentioned China in the context of the 2020 Baghdad International Airport airstrike in an interview with Anderson Cooper, saying: "... you can say there are a lot of bad people all over the world running governments... The President of China now has put a million people, Muslims, into educational camps – some would call them concentration camps."

=== Iran ===
Sanders supports the agreement with Iran reached by President Obama and Secretary of State John Kerry. While calling it less than a perfect agreement, he believes that the US needs to negotiate with Iran, rather than enter in another war in the Middle East.

During the January 17, 2016, Democratic debate in Charleston, South Carolina, Sanders criticized Iran by saying, "Their support for terrorism, the anti-American rhetoric that we're hearing from of their leadership is something that is not acceptable", and espoused the view that the US should apply the same policy it did toward normalizing relations with Cuba to Iran, through a "move in warm relations with a very powerful and important country in this world".

In 2017, Congress took up a bill designed to impose CAATSA sanctions on Russia, for its alleged interference in the 2016 election, and on Iran. Sanders announced that he supported the sanctions on Russia, but he voted against the bill because of the Iran provisions. He stated:

I have voted for sanctions on Iran in the past, and I believe sanctions were an important tool for bringing Iran to the negotiating table. But I believe that these new sanctions could endanger the very important nuclear agreement that was signed between the United States, its partners, and Iran in 2015. That is not a risk worth taking. ...

In October 2017, Sanders said that "the worst possible thing" the United States could do was undermine the Iran nuclear deal if it was "genuinely concerned with Iran's behavior in the region", and that the president's comments against the deal had isolated the US from foreign allies that had retained their commitment to the agreement.

In May 2018, Sanders was one of 12 senators to sign a letter to President Trump, urging him to remain in the Iran nuclear deal, on the grounds that "Iran could either remain in the agreement and seek to isolate the United States from our closest partners, or resume its nuclear activities" if the US pulled out, and that both possibilities "would be detrimental to our national security interests".

Following Patrick M. Shanahan announcing 1,000 more US troops being deployed to the Middle East for defensive purposes in June 2019, Sanders was one of six senators to sign a letter spearheaded by Tim Kaine and Mike Lee, expressing concern that "increasingly escalatory actions" by both the US and Iran would "lead to an unnecessary conflict". The senators noted that Congress had not authorized a war against Iran, and requested "a joint Defense, State, and Intelligence Community briefing by the end of June to address these policy and legal issues".

Sanders said during the Democratic primary debate hosted by NBC News: "I will do everything I can to prevent a war with Iran, which would be far worse than [the] disastrous war with Iraq."

Following the death of Qasem Soleimani in a US airstrike, Sanders tweeted: "Trump's dangerous escalation brings us closer to another disastrous war in the Middle East that could cost countless lives and trillions more dollars. Trump promised to end endless wars, but this action puts us on the path to another one."

=== India ===
Sanders, along with multiple other American politicians, expressed their concerns over the anti-Muslim North East Delhi riots. In response, on February 27, 2020, the Indian Foreign Ministry spokesperson, Raveesh Kumar, stated that these remarks were "factually inaccurate", "misleading", and "aimed at politicising the issue".

=== Iraq ===
Sanders strongly opposed the 2003 invasion of Iraq and voted against the 2002 resolution authorizing the use of force against that country. In a 2002 speech, he said: "I am opposed to giving the President a blank check to launch a unilateral invasion and occupation of Iraq"; and: "I will vote against this resolution. One, I have not heard any estimates of how many young American men and women might die in such a war, or how many tens of thousands of women and children in Iraq might also be killed. As a caring Nation, we should do everything we can to prevent the horrible suffering that a war will cause. War must be the last recourse in international relations, not the first. Second, I am deeply concerned about the precedent that a unilateral invasion of Iraq could establish in terms of international law and the role of the United Nations."

=== Islamic State of Iraq and Syria ===
Sanders has called the Islamic State of Iraq and Syria (ISIS) "a barbaric organization" and "a growing threat", but does not believe that the U.S. should lead the fight against it. Sanders believes that "the United States should be supportive, along with other countries, but we cannot and we should not be involved in perpetual warfare in the Middle East – the Muslim countries themselves have got to lead the effort".

On November 15, 2015, in response to ISIS' attacks in Paris, Sanders cautioned against Islamophobia, saying: "During these difficult times as Americans, we will not succumb to racism. We will not allow ourselves to be divided and succumb to Islamophobia. And while hundreds of thousands have lost everything, have nothing left but the shirts on their backs, we will not turn our backs on the refugees!"

Sanders criticized Saudi Arabia, Kuwait, Qatar, and UAE, saying that those "countries of enormous wealth and resources – have contributed far too little in the fight against ISIS". Sanders said Saudi Arabia, instead of fighting ISIS, has focused more on supporting the Yemeni government against Iranian sponsored Houthi militants in Yemen that seized control of much of the country in 2015, and Kuwait, which has been a well-known source of financing for ISIS, and Qatar is spending $200 billion on the 2022 World Cup, yet very little to fight against ISIS. "Wealthy and powerful Muslim nations in the region can no longer sit on the sidelines and expect the United States to do their work for them."

=== Syria and Assad ===
In January 2016, Sanders said on the Democratic primary debate: "Our first priority must be the destruction of ISIS. Our second must be getting rid of Assad." Then, in September 2019, Sanders told the Washington Post, "The world and in particular the Syrian people would be far better off without Bashar al-Assad, who is responsible for the mass murder of hundreds of thousands of innocent men, women and children, the forced migration of millions and the collapse of the nation of Syria. It is not up to the United States to topple him, and diplomatic engagement does not imply approval of him or of his activities. If he remains in power, the United States needs to engage with his regime in some fashion."

In April 2018, in a statement, Sanders said President Trump had "no legal authority for broadening the war in Syria" and recommended Trump approach Congress if he believed "expanding the war in Syria will bring stability to the region and protect American interests".

=== Israeli–Palestinian conflict ===
Sanders supports a two-state solution, saying that "the Palestinian people, in my view, deserve a state of their own, they deserve an economy of their own, they deserve economic support from the people of this country. And Israel needs to be able to live in security without terrorist attacks." Sanders has said Israel must have a right to live in peace and security.

In 2008, Sanders was a co-sponsor of a Senate Resolution, "recognizing the 60th anniversary of the founding of the modern State of Israel and reaffirming the bonds of close friendship and cooperation between the United States and Israel." The resolution reaffirmed Israel's right to defend itself against terror. It also congratulated Israel on building a strong nation and wished for a successful Israeli future.

According to Sanders' senate webpage, David Palumbo-Liu wrongly noted in Salon that Sen. Sanders "voted" for a resolution supporting Operation Protective Edge which had actually passed without a vote. A statement published on his Senate website reads in part: "Sanders believes the Israeli attacks that killed hundreds of innocent people – including many women and children – in bombings of civilian neighborhoods and UN controlled schools, hospitals, and refugee camps were disproportionate, and the widespread killing of civilians is completely unacceptable. Israel's actions took an enormous human toll, and appeared to strengthen support for Hamas and may well be sowing the seeds for even more hatred, war and destruction in future years."

The Intercept's Zaid Jilani wrote that Sanders "stood out in contrast to the remarks from the other four major party candidates" in the 2016 presidential election, criticizing Israel's policy of settlement expansion after violent episodes and defended self-determination, civil rights, and economic well-being for Palestinians. After AIPAC's refusal to accept Sanders's telepresence at their 2016 debate, former U.S. ambassador Marc Ginsberg explained the event saying that Bernie Sanders "has never really extolled his Jewishness, much less any support for Israel". Sanders was criticized for hiring IfNotNow founder Simone Zimmerman as his Jewish Outreach Coordinator, and she was fired from the campaign after critical social media posts about Israeli Prime Minister Benjamin Netanyahu and the conflict surfaced.

While being interviewed in April 2016 by the New York Daily News, Sanders said that Israel killed over 10,000 innocent civilians in Gaza, an unnecessarily high death toll. The Anti-Defamation League subsequently called on Sanders to withdraw remarks he made about the casualties, which the ADL said exaggerated the death toll of the 2014 Israel–Gaza conflict, citing a number far in excess of Palestinian or Israel sources' estimates. Sanders later clarified that he was quickly corrected in that the death toll was closer to 2,000 civilians.

In November 2017, Sanders was one of 10 Democratic senators to sign a letter urging Prime Minister of Israel Benjamin Netanyahu to halt the planned demolitions of Palestinian villages Khan al-Ahmar and Susiya on the grounds that such action would further diminish efforts to seek a two-state solution and "endanger Israel's future as a Jewish democracy." In December 2017, Sanders opposed President Trump's decision to recognize Jerusalem as Israel's capital.

In April 2018, shortly after the commencing of the 2018 Gaza border protests, Sanders stated, "From what my understanding is, you have tens and tens of thousands of people who are engaged in a nonviolent protest. I believe now 15 or 20 people, Palestinians, have been killed and many, many others have been wounded. So I think it's a difficult situation, but my assessment is that Israel overreacted on that." He furthered that Gaza remained "a humanitarian disaster" and called on the United States to play "a more positive role in ending the Gaza blockade and helping Palestinians and Israelis build a future that works for all."

During an October 2018 speech, Sanders said it was "hard to imagine that Israel's Netanyahu government would have taken a number of steps— including passing the recent 'Nation State law,' which essentially codifies the second-class status of Israel's non-Jewish citizens, aggressively undermining the longstanding goal of a two-state solution, and ignoring the economic catastrophe in Gaza — if Netanyahu wasn't confident that Trump would support him."

In March 2019, after Representative Ilhan Omar received criticism from Democrats and Republicans over comments about Israel that were deemed as anti-Semitic, Sanders condemned antisemitism as "a hateful and dangerous ideology which must be vigorously opposed in the United States and around the world" while noting that they should not "equate anti-Semitism with legitimate criticism of the right-wing, Netanyahu government in Israel." Sanders called for the formation of "an even-handed Middle East policy which brings Israelis and Palestinians together for a lasting peace" and voiced his concern that Omar was being targeted "as a way of stifling that debate."

In a July 2019 interview, Sanders stated that he believed "that the people of Israel absolutely have the right to live in peace, independence and security" but that the Netanyahu government was extremely right-wing "with many racist tendencies" and that the role of the United States was "to try to finally bring peace to the Middle East and to treat the Palestinian people with the kind of respect and dignity they deserve." Sanders reflected on the trillions of dollars spent on the War on Terror and asserted that as U.S. president he would favor sitting down "in a room with the leadership of Saudi Arabia, with the leadership of Iran, with the leadership of the Palestinians, with the leadership of Israel, and hammer out some damn agreements, which will try to end the conflicts that exist there forever."

During the 2020 presidential campaign, Sanders stated he would impose human rights conditions on aid to Israel, a statement his then-rival Joe Biden called "bizarre".

==== Gaza war ====
During the Gaza war, after Biden-appointed Secretary of State Antony Blinken had done so, Sanders called for a "humanitarian pause" to the conflict to allow aid to reach Gazan civilians, thoroughly condemning the bombings of civilian targets by the IDF and Netanyahu's anti-democratic policies and calling Hamas an "authoritarian nightmare, repressing dissent and stealing from Gazans not just the basic materials of life they need, but the dream of a better future." He continued to insist on a two-state solution. However, he was criticized by over 400 former staffers and over 300 presidential campaign delegates, as well as numerous Jewish and Palestinian American supporters, for not endorsing a full ceasefire to end the war. Sanders later called for a ceasefire in August 2024.

On July 25, 2025, speaking about the humanitarian crisis in the Gaza Strip, Sanders said in a statement: "Having already killed or wounded 200,000 Palestinians, mostly women and children, the extremist Israeli government is using mass starvation to engineer the ethnic cleansing of Gaza." He accused Israel of carrying out an "extermination" campaign in Gaza. In July 2025, Sanders called for an end to all US military aid to Israel.

In November 2024, April 2025, July 2025, and April 2026 Sanders forced votes in the U.S. senate to end military aid to Israel. All four attempts failed, though the third attempt received a majority of support from the Democratic caucus, and the fourth received 85 percent of support from the caucus.

In September 2025, Sanders became the first U.S. senator to affirm that Israel is committing genocide against Palestinians in Gaza.

During an October 2025 interview with Axios, when asked if he considers himself a Zionist, Sanders stated, "No. Not within the terms of what Zionism means."

==== BDS and defense of Israeli right to exist ====
Bernie Sanders supports a two-state solution to the Israeli-Palestinian conflict, opposes attempts at a one-state solution, opposes the Boycott, Divestment, and Sanctions movement against Israel (BDS), and maintains that the United Nations has a bias against Israel. He has also maintained that anti-Semitism plays a role in the BDS movement.

Following Sanders' signing of a US congressional letter denouncing a bias at the UN against Israel and calling upon UN Secretary-General António Guterres, urging him to remedy the problem, he defended his signature on an interview hosted by the Qatari news agency Al Jazeera, saying:

there are many problems with Israel ... On the other hand, to see Israel attacked over and over again for human rights violations — which may be true — when you have countries like Saudi Arabia or Syria, Saudi Arabia – I'm not quite sure if a woman can even drive a car today. So, I think the thrust of that letter is not to say that Israel does not have human rights issues — it does — but to say how come it's only Israel when you have other countries where women are treated as third-class citizens, where in Egypt, I don't know how many thousands of people now lingering in jail, so that's the point of that, not to defend Israel, but to say why only Israel."

Asked if he "respected" BDS as a protest tactic, Sanders has said "No, I don't", adding that it was counter-productive if the goal is trying to bring about peace talks. In 2016, Sanders averred that there was "absolutely" anti-Semitism in the BDS movement, elaborating:

Israel has done some very bad things, so has every other country on earth," Sanders said. "I think the people who want to attack Israel for their policies, I think that is fair game. But not to appreciate that there is some level of anti-Semitism around the world involved in that I think would be a mistake ... I spent many months on a kibbutz in Israel, so I know something about Israel. Israel has got to be defended, has a right to exist, but you cannot ignore the needs of the Palestinian people.

Sanders supports a two-state solution, and regarding the possibility of a one-state solution, he has stated:

I think if that happens, then that would be the end of the State of Israel and I support Israel's right to exist ... I think if there is the political will to make [peace and a two-state solution] happen and if there is good faith on both sides I do think it's possible, and I think there has not been good faith, certainly in this Israeli government and I have my doubts about parts of the Palestinian leadership as well.

In a December 2018 letter to Senate Majority Leader Mitch McConnell and Minority Leader Chuck Schumer, Sanders and Dianne Feinstein advocated against a provision of a spending package barring companies from endorsing anti-Israel boycotts promoted by governmental groups, writing that while they did not support "the Boycott, Divestment and Sanctions (BDS) movement, we remain resolved to our constitutional oath to defend the right of every American to express their views peacefully without fear of or actual punishment by the government." In February 2019, Sanders voted against a controversial Anti-Boycott Act initiated by Republicans, which would make it illegal for U.S. companies to engage in boycotts against Israel and Israeli settlements in the occupied Palestinian territories.

On December 14, 2023, Sanders introduced a privileged resolution invoking Section 502(b) of the Foreign Assistance Act, calling on the State Department to investigate Israeli crimes against humanity in its conduct of the war in Gaza, effectively forcing a Senate vote on withholding military aid to Israel. Sanders said that "This resolution is not prescriptive — it does not alter aid to Israel in any way. It simply requests that the State Department report on how our aid is being used." The resolution would freeze U.S. military aid to Israel unless the State Department issues a report within 30 days. The resolution failed in the Senate on January 16, 2024, with only eleven Senators voting for it. Sanders then announced on February 2 that he would introduce a cut of $10.1 billion in Israel-bound military aid to the $118 billion national security and immigration package the Senate was then debating. The aid package passed the Senate, and later the House, without his cut.

=== Henry Kissinger ===
During a 2016 Democratic debate, Sanders took issue with Hillary Clinton's admiration of former Secretary of State Henry Kissinger, describing him as "one of the most destructive" in US modern history, stating:

I am proud to say that Henry Kissinger is not my friend. I will not take advice from Henry Kissinger. In fact, Kissinger's actions in Cambodia, when the United States bombed that country, overthrew Prince Sihanouk, created the instability for Pol Pot and the Khmer Rouge to come in who then butchered some 3 million innocent people – one of the worst genocides in the history of the world.

=== Nicaraguan Revolution ===
During the Nicaraguan Revolution, Sanders opposed funding the Contra Rebels and praised the leadership and popularity of the Sandinista Party. Sanders stated that the support for the Sandinistas in their country was higher than the support of American voters for President Ronald Reagan and even those who did not vote for the Sandinistas did not want an invasion.

=== Venezuela ===
In August 2011, Sanders's official Senate webpage re-printed in full an editorial from the West Lebanon, New Hampshire Valley News stating: "These days, the American dream is more apt to be realized in South America, in places such as Ecuador, Venezuela and Argentina, where incomes are actually more equal today than they are in the land of Horatio Alger. Who's the banana republic now?"

Since the deterioration of Venezuelan living standards under the direction of the country's self-described socialist government, concerns and comparisons to Venezuela were raised over Sanders' desires to implement socialist policies in the United States. In 2016, Sanders responded by attempting to distance himself from Venezuela's Bolivarian government, replying to such worries by stating, "When I talk about democratic socialism, I'm not looking at Venezuela. I'm not looking at Cuba. I'm looking at countries like Denmark and Sweden". Danish Prime Minister Lars Løkke Rasmussen has contested Sanders's portrayal of the nation, saying Denmark is not socialist but rather has a capitalist market economy.

Sanders also furthered himself from the Venezuelan government by calling the leader of Venezuela's Bolivarian Revolution, former President Hugo Chávez, a "dead communist dictator".

During the 2019 Venezuelan presidential crisis, Sanders cautioned about President Donald Trump's decision to back a competing claim for the government in Venezuela, citing US support of coups in Chile, Guatemala, and Brazil. At the same time, Sanders condemned the actions of the Nicolás Maduro government.

In a February 2019 CNN town hall, when asked by Wolf Blitzer why he would not describe Maduro as a "dictator", Sanders admitted that it was "fair to say" Venezuela's last presidential election "was undemocratic" while noting other "democratic operations taking place in that country" and stated his support for "internationally supervised free elections."

In an April 2019 interview, Sanders stated that Maduro was heading a "failed regime" while also expressing his opposition to military intervention, furthering that the world community needed to "be mindful of the humanitarian suffering and the hunger that's going on in Venezuela right now" and that what one would want is "free and fair elections, and we want to do everything we can to establish democracy there." Sanders noted that all recent evidence had pointed to Maduro's reelection being under fraudulent circumstances and cited the need for establishing a democracy in Venezuela without "deciding that some politician is the new President, who never won any election."

=== Clinton Foundation ===
When asked by CNN's Jake Tapper in June 2016 if it was fair to criticize the Clinton Foundation, an American charity, for taking money from foreign governments which do not represent American values, Sanders responded, "Yes it is. It is. If you ask me about the Clinton Foundation, do I have a problem when a sitting secretary of state and a foundation run by her husband collects many millions of dollars from foreign governments, governments which are dictatorships -- you don't have a lot of civil liberties or democratic rights in Saudi Arabia. You don't have a lot of respect there for opposition points of view for gay rights, for women's rights. Yes, do I have a problem with that? Yes, I do." In September 2016, Sanders told NBC's Chuck Todd that if Clinton becomes president of the United States, she should cease all contact with the Foundation, but stopped short of agreeing it should be closed, noting, "I don't know enough. They do a lot of good things with A.I.D.S. and so forth. I can't, you know, definitively answer that."

=== United Kingdom and Jeremy Corbyn ===
In August 2016, Sanders praised Jeremy Corbyn in his candidacy in the Labour Party leadership election. Corbyn said that he had received a message from Sanders saying that Sanders was dismissed as unelectable but that the real reason many dismissed him was that he was electable and a threat to the American political establishment.

During a speech promoting his book at the Brighton Festival in June 2017, Sanders drew parallels between Corbyn and himself, saying: "What Corbyn has tried to do with the Labour Party is not dissimilar to what some of us are trying to do with the Democratic Party, and that is to make it a party that is much more open and inviting for working people and young people and not have a liberal elite making the decisions from the top down. I think what Corbyn is doing is trying to revitalise democracy, bring a lot of new people into the political process and I think that's an excellent idea ..." He added: "...he has taken on the establishment of the Labour Party, he has gone to the grassroots and he has tried to transform that party ..."

After the 2017 general election, Sanders wrote in The New York Times that "the British elections should be a lesson for the Democratic Party" and urged the Democrats to stop holding on to an "overly cautious, centrist ideology", arguing that "momentum shifted to Labour after it released a very progressive manifesto that generated much enthusiasm among young people and workers".

=== Russia and Ukraine ===
In December 2010, Sanders voted for the ratification of New START, a nuclear arms reduction treaty between the United States and Russian Federation obliging both countries to have no more than 1,550 strategic warheads as well as 700 launchers deployed during the next seven years along with providing a continuation of on-site inspections that halted when START I expired the previous year. It was the first arms treaty with Russia in eight years.

In July 2017, Sanders voted against the Countering America's Adversaries Through Sanctions Act that placed sanctions on Russia together with Iran and North Korea. 98 senators voted for the act, Rand Paul was the only other Senator to vote no. Sanders supported the sanctions on Russia, but he voted against the bill because of the Iran provisions.

During December 2018, in response to President Trump's October announcement that he intended to withdraw the United States from the Intermediate-Range Nuclear Forces Treaty, Sanders was one of seven senators to cosponsor the Prevention of Arms Race Act of 2018, legislation prohibiting funding for a U.S. ground-launched or ballistic missile that had "a range of between 500 and 5,500 kilometers" until the administration provided a report meeting five specific conditions. Sanders also cosponsored this legislation when it was reintroduced by Senator Jeff Merkley in the 116th United States Congress.

In December 2018, after United States Secretary of State Mike Pompeo announced the Trump administration was suspending its obligations in the Intermediate-Range Nuclear Forces Treaty in 60 days in the event that Russia continued to violate the treaty, Sanders was one of twenty-six senators to sign a letter expressing concern over the administration "now abandoning generations of bipartisan U.S. leadership around the paired goals of reducing the global role and number of nuclear weapons and ensuring strategic stability with America's nuclear-armed adversaries" and calling on President Trump to continue arms negotiations.

In a January 2020 speech, Sanders said on Russian interference in the 2020 United States elections, "Let me be clear: We must not live in denial while allowing Russia and other state actors to undermine our democracy or divide us. Russia targets the divisions in our society; we will work to heal those divisions."

On February 21, 2020, The Washington Post reported that, according to unnamed US officials, Russia was interfering in the Democratic primary in an effort to support Sanders' nomination. Sanders issued a statement after the news report, condemning Russian President Vladimir Putin as an "autocratic thug", and saying in part, "I don't care, frankly, who Putin wants to be president. My message to Putin is clear: stay out of American elections, and as president I will make sure that you do." Sanders acknowledged that his campaign was briefed about Russia's alleged efforts about a month prior. Sanders suggested that Russians were impersonating people claiming to be his supporters online in order to create an atmosphere of toxicity and give "Bernie Bros" a bad reputation, a suggestion that Twitter rejected.

Regarding the Russo-Ukrainian War and the build-up of Russian troops near the Ukrainian border in early 2022, Sanders emphasized in an opinion in The Guardian, and reiterated in a later Senate speech according to The American Prospect's Harold Meyerson, that Putin represented an anti-democratic movement in Europe, calling Putin "a liar and a demagogue", and said, "In my view, we must unequivocally support the sovereignty of Ukraine and make clear that the international community will impose severe consequences on Putin and his associates if he does not change course." At the same time, Sanders argued that an extensive land war in Europe would be disastrous, citing estimates of 50,000 civilian casualties, as would broad sanctions against the Russian people. He implied NATO was acting with "intransigence", said "The fact is that the US and Ukraine entering into a deeper security relationship is likely to have some very serious costs – for both countries," and argued it is "hypocritical" for the United States to consider the foreign policy interests of its neighbors (per the Monroe Doctrine) but not view Russia as justified in doing so. He also cited the example of Finland as a successful non-NATO member with a strong democracy and border with Russia. Sanders emphasized "diplomatic efforts to deescalate this crisis".

In response to Putin's recognition of the pro-Russian separatist enclaves of Luhansk People's Republic and Donetsk People's Republic and the 2022 Russian invasion of Ukraine, Sanders said in a statement, "Vladimir Putin's latest invasion of Ukraine is an indefensible violation of international law, regardless of whatever false pretext he offers. There has always been a diplomatic solution to this situation. Tragically, Putin appears intent on rejecting it." He announced his support for targeted sanctions against "Putin and his oligarchs" and emphasized the need for the United States to help "Ukraine's neighbors care for refugees fleeing this conflict" and the rest of the world to pursue a fossil fuel phase-out to "deny authoritarian petrostates the revenues they require to survive".

In February 2025, Sanders condemned Trump's comments on President of Ukraine Volodymyr Zelenskyy, which included calling Zelenskyy a "dictator without elections". Sanders stated that the comments were indicative of a new Putin-Trump alliance, one he believed would entail "abandoning [the United States'] allies".

=== Myanmar ===
Sanders condemned the genocide of the Rohingya Muslim minority in Myanmar and called for a stronger response to the crisis.

=== North Korea ===
In April 2017, after President Trump acknowledged the possibility of a "major, major conflict" between North Korea and the US, Sanders said such a conflict equated to a nuclear war and advocated for the US to lean on China, citing China's receiving of exports from North Korea and thereby being in "a position to tighten the screws on North Korea and tell them they cannot continue their missile program or their nuclear program."

In October 2017, Sanders and six Democrats were led by Chris Murphy in introducing legislation prohibiting "funds from being used for kinetic military operations without congressional approval unless the United States faces an imminent threat or such action is necessary to defend citizens or our allies" in light of rhetorical escalation between the US and North Korea as well as "contradictory behavior from Trump and officials in his administration".

In February 2018, Sanders was one of eighteen senators to sign a letter to President Trump arguing that striking North Korea with "a preventative or preemptive U.S. military strike would lack either a constitutional basis or legal authority" without congressional approval.

In April 2018, when asked by a reporter about the US pursuing diplomatic relations with North Korea, Sanders said, "I think the idea of sitting down and having direct negotiations with North Korea is a step forward, and I hope it works out well." After President Trump met with North Korean leader Kim Jong-un during the 2018 North Korea-United States summit, Sanders called the summit "very light on substance" but also representing "a positive step in de-escalating tensions between our countries, addressing the threat of North Korea's nuclear weapons, and moving toward a more peaceful future."

In February 2019, ahead of the North Korea–United States Hanoi Summit, Sanders said, "I think nuclear weapons in the hands of a brutal, irresponsible dictator is a bad idea. And if Trump can succeed ... through face-to-face meetings with Kim Jong Un and rid that country of nuclear weapons that is a very good thing."

In a May 2019 interview, Sanders stated that "the idea of sitting down with Kim Jong Un is the right thing to do", citing this as difficult but necessary due to North Korea being a threat to the planet, and that the United States had "to do everything we can to have China and the people in the Pacific Rim put as much pressure on North Korea and make it clear that they cannot continue to act this way."

In June 2019, following President Trump becoming the first sitting U.S. president to cross into North Korea and announcing that stalled talks between the US and North Korea on nuclear capabilities would resume, Sanders stated that he did not have a problem with President Trump "sitting down and negotiating with our adversaries," but that he opposed such meetings being reduced to "a photo opportunity." He called for the US to have "real diplomacy" and criticized President Trump for weakening the State Department, citing the agency's strength as essential to moving "forward diplomatically."

=== Mexico ===
In a January 2018 statement, Sanders said he was "not sure why President Trump wants to shut down the government over a multi-billion dollar wall that no one wants, is not needed and will not be paid for by Mexico" and that Americans instead overwhelmingly favored providing "legal protection to 800,000 Dreamers and a path toward citizenship for them."

=== United Nations ===
In June 2018, following the United Nations releasing a report on poverty in the United States and condemning "President Trump's administration for pursuing high tax breaks for the rich and removing basic protections for the poor", Sanders was one of twenty lawmakers to sign a letter to United States Ambassador to the United Nations Nikki Haley calling for the Trump administration to develop a plan to address poverty. Haley responded to Sanders in a letter, writing that it was "patently ridiculous for the United Nations to examine poverty in America" and charged the report with misstating "the progress the United States has made in addressing poverty and purposely used misleading facts and figures in its biased reporting." Sanders disputed Haley in a subsequent letter, defending the appropriateness of the U.N.'s report and noting that poverty was occurring "in the richest country in the history of the world and at a time when wealth and income inequality is worse than at any time since the 1920s."

=== Saudi Arabia ===
In June 2017, Sanders voted for a resolution by Rand Paul and Chris Murphy that would block President Trump's 510 million sale of precision-guided munitions to Saudi Arabia that made up a portion of the 110 billion arms sale Trump announced during his visit to Saudi Arabia the previous year.

In September 2017, Sanders called Saudi Arabia "an undemocratic country that has supported terrorism around the world, it has funded terrorism. ... They are not an ally of the United States."

On October 9, 2018, Sanders said that Saudi Arabia "is a despotic dictatorship that does not tolerate dissent, that treats women as third-class citizens, and has spent the last several decades exporting a very extreme form of Islam around the world. Saudi Arabia is currently devastating the country of Yemen in a catastrophic war in alliance with the United States."

In October 2018, Sanders said that if Saudis murdered journalist Jamal Khashoggi, the US should "not only stop military sales, not only put sanctions on Saudi Arabia, but most importantly, get out of this terrible, terrible war in Yemen led by the Saudis." He maintained that the US could not "have an ally who murders in cold blood, in their own consulate, a critic, a dissident". Later that month, Sanders was one of eight senators to sign a letter to Director of National Intelligence Dan Coats requesting a classified briefing on what the American intelligence community knew about threats to Khashoggi so that the senators may fulfill their "oversight obligation" as members of Congress. In a column for The New York Times, Sanders called on the United States to end its backing of the Saudi intervention in Yemen against the Houthis, saying that US support for this war makes it complicit in crimes against humanity and that its participation is unconstitutional because it had not been authorized by Congress.

In November 2018, Sanders confirmed his intent to force a vote on ending American support for the Saudi-led intervention in Yemen in an email to supporters, writing that despite President Trump's "venal support for the Saudi regime, I am confident that we now stand an excellent chance to win this vote which I plan on bringing back to the Senate floor this week." On November 28, as the Senate weighed the resolution to end American military support for the Saudi-led campaign in Yemen's civil war, Sanders said, "In my mind it is imperative today that the United States Senate tell Saudi Arabia and tell the world that we are not going to be continuing to be part of that humanitarian disaster. We have to make the decision as to what happens in the war in Yemen and our role in that, and that's what the vote today is about." The resolution passed in a vote of 63 to 37.

The Senate voted to pass Sanders's resolution again on March 13, 2019, in a vote of 54 to 46. Sanders stated that the resolution's passage would begin the process of reasserting Congress's "responsibility over war making" and that "Article 1 of the Constitution clearly states that it is Congress, not the president, that has the power to declare war."

In April 2019, after the House passed the resolution withdrawing American support for the Saudi-led coalition in Yemen, Sanders was one of nine lawmakers to sign a letter to President Trump requesting a meeting with him and urging him to sign "Senate Joint Resolution 7, which invokes the War Powers Act of 1973 to end unauthorized US military participation in the Saudi-led coalition's armed conflict against Yemen's Houthi forces, initiated in 2015 by the Obama administration." They asserted the "Saudi-led coalition's imposition of an air-land-and-sea blockade as part of its war against Yemen's Houthis has continued to prevent the unimpeded distribution of these vital commodities, contributing to the suffering and death of vast numbers of civilians throughout the country" and that Trump's approval of the resolution through his signing would give a "powerful signal to the Saudi-led coalition to bring the four-year-old war to a close".

In July 2022, Sanders criticized President Biden's visit to Saudi Arabia, referencing Bin Salman's role in the Khashoggi murder and he did not believe "that that type of government should be rewarded with a visit by the president of the United States." Sanders added that the US should not "be maintaining a warm relationship with a dictatorship like that" if it believed in democracy and human rights.

== National security ==
=== Surveillance ===
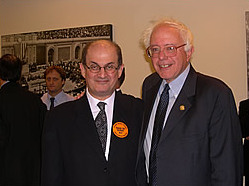
Sanders and Salman Rushdie in 2004 protesting section 215 of the USA Patriot Act

Sanders has long been critical of U.S. government surveillance policies. He voted against the USA PATRIOT Act and all of its renewals and has characterized the National Security Agency as "out of control." He has frequently criticized warrantless wiretapping and the collection of the phone, email, library, and internet browsing records of American citizens without due process:

In my view, the NSA is out of control and operating in an unconstitutional manner. I worry very much about kids growing up in a society where they think 'I'm not going to talk about this issue, read this book, or explore this idea because someone may think I'm a terrorist.' That is not the kind of free society I want for our children.

In June 2013, following reports that the National Security Agency (NSA) had used statutes under the Patriot Act to obtain the phone records and emails of United States denizens, Sanders was one of twenty-six senators to sign a letter espousing the view that the records could "reveal personal relationships, family medical issues, political and religious affiliations, and a variety of other private personal information" and other bulk information associated with the USA Patriot Act "could clearly have a significant impact on Americans' privacy and liberties as well."

In October 2015, during the first Democratic presidential debate, the candidates were asked for their opinion of NSA whistleblower Edward Snowden. When asked the question "hero or traitor?" Sanders replied, "I think Snowden played a very important role in educating the American people to the degree in which our civil liberties and our constitutional rights are being undermined. He did—he did break the law, and I think there should be a penalty to that. But I think what he did in educating us should be taken into consideration." Journalist Norman Solomon praised Sanders's reply saying, "I think Bernie Sanders handled it the best in terms of scoping out and describing the terrain. And for the most part, I think Edward Snowden would probably agree with what he said."

In August 2019, Sanders announced that he supported a ban on law enforcement agencies' use of facial recognition technology.

=== Veterans ===
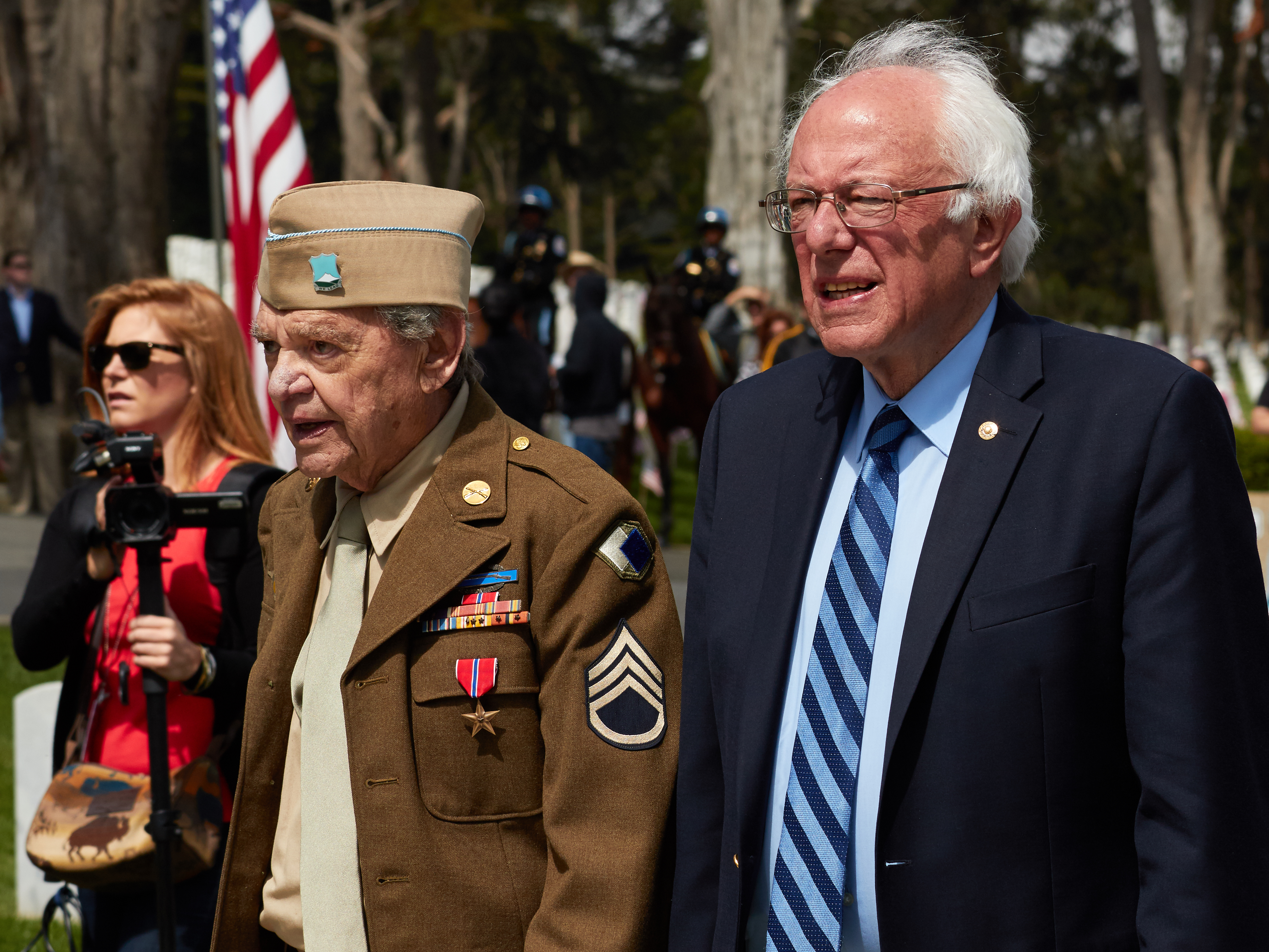
Sanders during the Memorial Day Ceremony 2016 in the Presidio of San Francisco

Sanders won the 2014 Col. Arthur T. Marix Congressional Leadership Award from the Military Officers Association of America for his leadership in support of veterans. Sanders introduced the Veterans' Compensation Cost-of-Living Adjustment Act of 2013 (S. 893; 113th Congress) into the Senate on May 8, 2013. It increased the disability compensation rate for American veterans and their families. Sanders co-wrote, with Senator John McCain, the Veterans' Access to Care through Choice, Accountability, and Transparency Act of 2014, a bill intended to reform the United States Department of Veterans Affairs in response to the Veterans Health Administration scandal of 2014.

In December 2018, Sanders was one of 21 senators to sign a letter to Veterans Affairs Secretary Robert Wilkie, calling it "appalling that the VA is not conducting oversight of its own outreach efforts", in spite of suicide prevention being the VA's highest clinical priority, and requesting Wilkie "consult with experts with proven track records of successful public and mental health outreach campaigns, with a particular emphasis on how those individuals measure success".

=== Defense budget ===
Sanders supports decreasing U.S. military spending. He attempted to reduce the size of the $740 billion National Defense Authorization Act for Fiscal Year 2021, but his motion was rejected 23–77.

== Education ==
=== Early childhood ===
Drawing figures from a recent report ranking the U.S. 33rd out of 36 nations in reading literacy, 27th in mathematical literacy, 22nd in science literacy, and 18th overall in secondary education, Sanders has said: "In a society with our resources, it is unconscionable that we do not properly invest in our children from the very first stages of their lives." He has introduced legislation to provide child care and early education to all children six weeks old through kindergarten. Sanders believes that "the 'Foundations for Success Act' would provide pre-school children with a full range of services, leading to success in school and critical support for hard-pressed families nationwide".

Sanders has previously supported Common Core State Standards, but his public position at the time of his 2020 presidential campaign is unknown. In 2015, Sanders voted against an amendment that would have prohibited the federal government from incentivizing states to adopt Common Core. He also voted in favor of an act allocating funds to the Race to the Top program, which incentivized states to adopt Common Core. Later that year, however, Sanders voted in favor of the Every Child Achieves Act, part of which aimed to prevent the government from using federal funds to promote Common Core.

=== School choice and K–12 education reform ===
The position of Sanders on school choice was unknown before 2019. In May 2019, on the 65th anniversary of the Supreme Court's ruling on Brown v. Board of Education, Sanders introduced a policy proposal that included a blanket ban on for-profit charter schools, an increase in regulatory oversight of existing charter schools, and a temporary moratorium on funding for new non-profit charter schools, ending upon full review of their effectiveness. The proposal also included tripling funding for Title I schools, improving funding for publicly run magnet schools and free school-provided meal programs, "re-thinking" the ways states and localities fund education, in light of the property tax system favoring the wealthy, and raising the national minimum wage for teachers to $60,000 per year.

=== Student loans ===
Sanders has long been an advocate of making college more affordable. He has spoken out against the high interest rates on federal student loans, noting that in the next ten years, the federal government will profit by as much as $127 billion from them. He has also criticized President Obama for signing legislation that temporarily froze student loan interest rates in exchange for allowing the rates to reach historic highs over the next two years. Sanders believes closing corporate tax loopholes is the solution, and has developed both a proposal to improve debtors' ability to refinance student loans at lower interest rates, and a plan bringing matching grants from the federal and state governments to cut tuition at public universities by more than half. He has criticized both Republicans and Democrats for failing to institute reforms that will stop predatory lending practices in the student loan market.

In June 2019, Sanders announced a plan to forgive all outstanding student loan debt which would be paid for with a financial transaction tax on Wall Street speculation.

A December 2019 Government Accountability Office (GAO) report, commissioned by Sanders, shows that the millennial generation will be the first to have lower living standards than their parents, primarily as the result of student loan debt and stagnant wages, and will likely not have opportunities to improve their lives. Commenting on the report, Sanders said "it is about time we take a hard look at this research and stand up for our young people who dream of making it into the middle class. We must tell the economic elite who have hoarded income growth in America: No, you can no longer have it all."

=== Tuition-free public universities ===
Sanders favors public funding for college students. He believes "we live in a highly competitive global economy and, if our economy is to be strong, we need the best-educated workforce in the world." He further maintains that many other developed nations in Western Europe have long taken this approach to higher education. Sanders expects strong opposition from the Republican Party, but says it is ultimately "the American people" who will determine its failure or success.

On May 19, 2015, Sanders introduced the College for All Act (S.1373), which would use a Robin Hood tax of 50 cents on every "$100 of stock trades on stock sales" to fund tuition at four-year public colleges and universities for students who meet admission standards. In addition, the Robin Hood tax would include a 0.5% speculation fee to be charged on investment houses, hedge funds, and other stock trades, while a 0.1% fee would be charged on bonds, and a 0.005% fee on derivatives.

== Health care ==
Sanders is a staunch supporter of a universal health care system, and he has said: "If you are serious about real health-care reform, the only way to go is single-payer." He advocates lowering the cost of drugs that are expensive because they remain under patent for years; some drugs costing thousands of dollars per year in the U.S. are available for hundreds, or less, in countries where they can be obtained as generics.

In May 2013, as chairman of the Senate Subcommittee on Primary Health and Aging, Sanders introduced legislation intended to re-authorize and strengthen the Older Americans Act, which supports Meals on Wheels and other programs for seniors. He believes that supporting seniors "is not only the right thing to do, it is the financially smart thing to do", because it decreases expensive hospitalizations and allows seniors to remain in their homes.

In June 2015, after the Supreme Court ruled to uphold the ACA's subsidies, Sanders stated the ruling was not a surprise, since no one "thought that we should look at the ... federal exchanges any differently than the state exchanges", and stressed that "today, despite the gains of the Affordable Care Act, which is certainly voted for, we still have 35 million Americans without any health insurance, and many more who are under-insured".

In December 2016, Sanders was one of five senators to vote against the Obama administration-supported 21st Century Cures Act, legislation increasing funding for disease research, while addressing flaws in the American mental health systems and altering drugs and medical devices' regulatory system.

In July 2017, during a CNN appearance, Sanders stated that Republicans had upended the standard process for handling bills in the Senate, describing the current process applied toward the AHCA as one "in which the bills being brought forth are opposed by the American Medical Association, the American Hospital Association, the AARP — every major health-care organization in America — and they're trying to push this thing through".

In December 2018, Sanders was one of 42 senators to sign a letter to Trump administration officials Alex Azar, Seema Verma, and Steve Mnuchin arguing that the administration was improperly using Section 1332 of the Affordable Care Act to authorize states to "increase health care costs for millions of consumers, while weakening protections for individuals with pre-existing conditions". The senators requested the administration withdraw the policy and "re-engage with stakeholders, states, and Congress".

In January 2019, during the 2018–2019 United States federal government shutdown, Sanders was one of 34 senators to sign a letter to Commissioner of Food and Drugs Scott Gottlieb recognizing the efforts of the FDA to address the effect of the government shutdown on the public health and employees, while remaining alarmed "that the continued shutdown will result in increasingly harmful effects on the agency's employees and the safety and security of the nation's food and medical products".

In a February 2019 letter to Catalyst Pharmaceuticals, Sanders criticized the company's decision to set the annual list price of Firdapse at $375,000, which was previously free, as "a blatant fleecing of American taxpayers", and "also an immoral exploitation of patients who need this medication". Sanders requested Catalyst provide financial and non-financial factors that led to the new price, along with questioning how many patients would suffer or die as a result of the price increase.

In June 2019, Sanders was one of eight senators to co-sponsor the Territories Health Equity Act of 2019, legislation that would remove the cap on annual federal Medicaid funding and increase federal matching rate for Medicaid expenditures of territories, along with more funds being provided for prescription drug coverage to low-income seniors, in an attempt to equalize funding for the American territories Puerto Rico, the Virgin Islands, Guam, American Samoa, and the Northern Mariana Islands with that of the U.S. states. Sanders stated the need "to ensure a strong health care system in all the territories and address inequities in federal law that have allowed the territories to fall behind in almost every measurable social and economic criteria".

On July 29, 2019, following Senator Kamala Harris releasing her own Medicare for All plan that would put the US on the path toward a government-backed health insurance system over the course of 10 years, without entirely abolishing private insurance, Sanders stated that the plan was not Medicare for All, which he defined as understanding "that health care is a human right, and the function of a sane health care system is not to make sure that insurance companies and drug companies make tens of billions of dollars in profit". He noted one of his disagreements with the Harris plan was the goal of a 10-year period of transitioning to Medicare for All, citing his belief that four years was enough.

In August 2019, Sanders and four Senate Democrats signed a letter to Acting FDA Commissioner Dr. Ned Sharples, in response to Novartis falsifying data as part of an attempt to gain the FDA's approval for its new gene therapy Zolgensma, writing that it was "unconscionable that a drug company would provide manipulated data to federal regulators in order to rush its product to market, reap federal perks, and charge the highest amount in American history for its medication".

In 2023, Sanders introduced a price control plan for certain drugs developed with federal funding. He later stated he would vote no on the nomination of Monica Bertagnolli to head the National Institutes of Health due to her insufficient answers on lowering drug prices.

In April 2025, Sanders introduced a revised version of the Medicare for All Act, proposing a single-payer healthcare system that would cover all U.S. residents. Under the proposal, coverage would include hospital and physician services, prescription drugs, mental health and substance use treatment, dental and vision care, long-term care, and reproductive and gender-affirming healthcare. The plan would also remove deductibles, co-payments and most other out-of-pocket costs, while allowing private insurers to offer supplementary coverage.

== Social issues ==
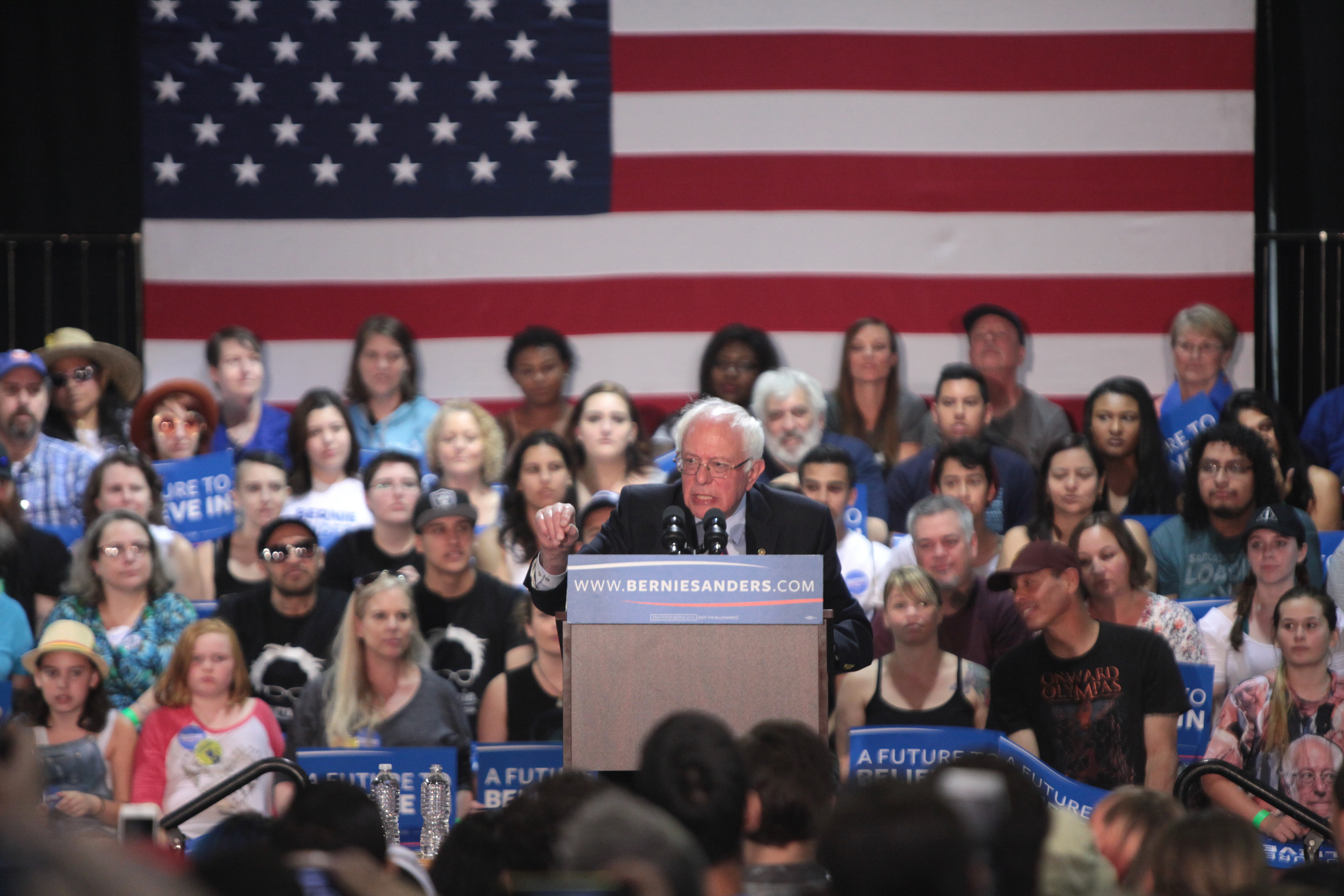
Sanders at a March 2016 rally in Phoenix, Arizona

=== Abortion ===
In June 2003, Sanders voted against the Partial-Birth Abortion Ban Act.

In 2016, he described Planned Parenthood, the largest and most well-known provider of abortion and reproductive health services in the United States, as part of the establishment he opposes. He was also dismissive of abortion as less-important to voters and his campaign than economic issues. He also criticized anti-abortion remarks of Donald Trump's as a distraction from the serious issues facing America.

In February 2019, Sanders and 43 other Democrats voted against the Born-Alive Abortion Survivors Protection Act, which would have required health care practitioners present at the time of a failed abortion to "exercise the same degree of professional skill, care, and diligence to preserve the life and health of the child as a reasonably diligent and conscientious health care practitioner would render to any other child born alive at the same gestational age".

In June 2019, amid Democratic presidential candidates announcing their support for repealing the Hyde Amendment, Sanders stated that he only voted for the amendment when it was part of larger spending bills, and that he believed his record of "being literally 100 percent pro-choice is absolutely correct". Sanders pledged that he would never "nominate someone to the Supreme Court that is not 100 percent defending Roe V. Wade", and that supporting the latter Supreme Court decision was his only litmus test for Supreme Court nominees.

NARAL Pro-Choice America has given Sanders a 100% rating on his abortion rights voting record.

=== Agriculture ===
Sanders has expressed opposition to industry consolidation and support for greater environmental and animal welfare standards in food and agribusiness. In 2019, he told Iowa Citizens for Community Improvement that he supports a ban on the construction and expansion of concentrated animal feeding operations (CAFOs), sometimes referred to as factory farms. At a town hall event in September 2019, Sanders stated: "We're going to end factory farming, because it's a danger to the environment." In 2020, Sanders was a cosponsor of Senator Cory Booker's Farm System Reform Act, which would have imposed a moratorium on the construction of new CAFOs, phased out large CAFOs over 20 years, and created a fund to transition farmers away from intensive animal farming to other agricultural operations.

In March 2019, Sanders was one of 38 senators to sign a letter to Secretary of Agriculture Sonny Perdue warning that dairy farmers "have continued to face market instability and are struggling to survive the fourth year of sustained low prices", and urging his department to "strongly encourage these farmers to consider the Dairy Margin Coverage program".

In 2021, Sanders voted against Tom Vilsack's confirmation as Secretary of Agriculture, citing Vilsack's past lobbying work for the dairy industry. In 2022, he joined a letter to Solicitor General of the United States Elizabeth Prelogar urging Prelogar to support the California farm animal welfare law Proposition 12 against a Supreme Court challenge filed by the National Pork Producers Council. In August 2023, he joined a letter by 30 Senators opposing federal efforts to overturn Proposition 12 and other state and local laws regulating intensive battery cages, gestation crates, and veal crates.

=== D.C. statehood ===
Sanders has stated that he believes it is "morally wrong" for Washington, D. C., residents to be denied federal representation. In 2015, he joined 17 other senators in co-sponsoring legislation in support of D. C. statehood, under the name "New Columbia".

=== Paid leave ===
Sanders has been a prominent supporter of laws requiring companies to provide their workers parental leave, sick leave, and vacation time, arguing that such laws have been adopted by almost every developed country, and that there are significant disparities among workers having access to paid sick and paid vacation time.

Sanders's Guaranteed Paid Vacation Act (S.1564) would mandate companies to provide 10 days of paid vacation for employees who have worked for them for at least one year. He is co-sponsoring a Senate bill that would give mothers and fathers 12 weeks of paid family leave to care for a baby after birth. It would also allow workers to take the same amount of paid time off if they are diagnosed with cancer or have other serious medical conditions, or to take care of family members who are seriously ill. Sanders has also co-sponsored a bill that would guarantee workers at least seven paid sick days per year for short-term illness, routine medical care, or to care for a sick family member.

=== Gun laws ===
Sanders supports banning assault weapons, universal federal background checks, and closing the gun show loophole.

While in the House of Representatives, representing a "state with virtually no gun laws", Sanders voted against the Brady Handgun Violence Prevention Act that required federal background checks on firearm purchasers in the US; he later voted for the post-Newtown Manchin-Toomey universal federal background check bill as a US Senator in 2013. In the Senate, he voted for the 2005 Protection of Lawful Commerce in Arms Act. When asked, Sanders stated his view that mandatory waiting periods were best left to states.

With regard to proposed legislation enabling gun violence victims to sue gun manufacturers, Sanders said: "If somebody has a gun, and it falls into the hands of a murderer, and the murderer kills somebody with a gun, do you hold the gun manufacturer responsible? Not any more than you would hold a hammer company responsible if somebody beats somebody over the head with a hammer." Sanders has said: "We have millions of people who are gun owners in this country -- 99.9% of those people obey the law. I want to see real, serious debate and action on guns, but it is not going to take place if we simply have extreme positions on both sides. I think I can bring us to the middle."

Following the Las Vegas shooting in October 2017, Sanders was one of twenty-four senators to sign a letter to National Institutes of Health Director Dr. Francis Collins, espousing the view that it was critical the NIH "dedicate a portion of its resources to the public health consequences of gun violence", at a time when 93 Americans die per day from gun-related fatalities, and noted that the Dickey Amendment did not prohibit objective, scientific inquiries into shooting death prevention.

In November 2017, Sanders was a co-sponsor of the Military Domestic Violence Reporting Enhancement Act, a bill that would form a charge of Domestic Violence under the Uniform Code of Military Justice (UCMJ) and stipulate that convictions would have to be reported to federal databases, with the authority to keep abusers from purchasing firearms within three days, in an attempt to close a loophole in the Uniform Code of Military Justice (UCMJ) through which convicted abusers retained the ability to purchase firearms.

In March 2018, Sanders was one of 10 senators to sign a letter to the Chairman of the United States Senate Committee on Health, Education, Labor, and Pensions Lamar Alexander and the ranking Democrat Patty Murray, requesting they schedule a hearing on the causes and remedies of mass shootings in the wake of the Stoneman Douglas High School shooting.

In a May 2018 interview, Sanders said President Trump and Republicans "don't have the guts to stand up to" the NRA, and that the Senate had not done enough toward gun control legislation. He added that "common sense" gun control was supported by Americans overwhelmingly.

In January 2019, Sanders joined 39 Democrats in introducing the Background Check Expansion Act, a bill that would require background checks for either the sale or transfer of all firearms, including all unlicensed sellers. Exceptions to the bill's background check requirement included transfers between members of law enforcement, loaning firearms for either hunting or sporting events on a temporary basis, providing firearms as gifts to members of one's immediate family, firearms being transferred as part of an inheritance, or giving a firearm to another person temporarily for immediate self-defense.

Sanders was delivering remarks at an August 3, 2019, presidential forum in Las Vegas as news broke of the 2019 El Paso shooting. He stated that Americans overwhelmingly supported gun control reform, and referred to the 2017 Las Vegas shooting "where some lunatic killed fifty-some-odd people and wounded hundreds of people". In response to the El Paso and Dayton shootings over the weekend, Sanders co-sponsored the Extreme Risk Protection Order Act, a bill authorizing states to use grants to develop red flag laws which would grant family members the ability to petition courts for an order that would temporarily prevent someone from purchasing a gun. The state laws would also allow family members to petition for an order for law enforcement to take a firearm away.

=== Child care ===
In 2019, Sanders and 34 Democrats introduced the Child Care for Working Families Act, a bill that created 770,000 new child care jobs and that ensured families under 75 percent of the state median income did not pay for child care, with higher-earning families having to pay "their fair share for care on a sliding scale, regardless of the number of children they have". The legislation also supported universal access to high-quality pre-school programs for all 3- and 4-year-olds, and gave the child care workforce a changed compensation and training, to aid both teachers and caregivers.

=== Criminal justice reform ===
Sanders's platform for decarceration in the United States calls for reducing the U.S. inmate population in half through reforms to sentencing guidelines, drug policy, an end to cash bail and programs that distribute military equipment to police, as well as stricter use of force policies within police departments. Noting that there are more people incarcerated in the U.S. than in any country in the world, at an annual cost to taxpayers of $70 billion, Sanders argues that the money would be better spent on education and jobs. He has spoken out against police brutality and the uneven rates of arresting African Americans and other minorities, saying: "From Ferguson[,] [Missouri], to Baltimore[,] [Maryland], and across this nation, too many African Americans and other minorities find themselves subjected to a system that treats citizens who have not committed crimes as if they were criminals, and that is unacceptable." Following the release of footage depicting the arrest of African American Sandra Bland for a minor traffic violation, Sanders strongly condemned the "totally outrageous police behavior" shown in the video, stating that "This video highlights once again why we need real police reform. People should not die for a minor traffic infraction. This type of police abuse has become an all-too-common occurrence for people of color, and it must stop."

Sanders has also spoken out against the privatization of prisons throughout the US, stating:

It is morally repugnant and a national tragedy that we have privatized prisons all over America. In my view, corporations should not be allowed to make a profit by building more jails and keeping more Americans behind bars. We have got to end the private-for-profit prison racket in America!

On September 17, 2015, Sanders introduced the "Justice Is Not for Sale" Act, which prohibits the US government at federal, state, and local levels from contracting with private firms to provide and/or operate detention facilities within two years. He noted that, "We cannot fix our criminal justice system if corporations are allowed to profit from mass incarceration."

Sanders voted in favor of the 1994 Crime Bill, which played a role in increasing the American prison population and causing racial disparities in the criminal justice system. Sanders said, at the time, he was voting for the crime bill because it included the Violence Against Women Act. He has indicated he has a problem with what is referred to as "Mass Incarceration".

In December 2018, Sanders voted for the First Step Act, legislation aimed at reducing recidivism rates among federal prisoners through expanding job training and other programs, in addition to forming an expansion of early-release programs and modifications on sentencing laws such as mandatory minimum sentences for non-violent drug offenders, "to more equitably punish drug offenders".

In July 2019, when asked by Jake Tapper if he was satisfied with his vote for the 1994 Crime Bill, Sanders replied that he was not happy that he had "voted for a terrible bill", but was glad that he was honest with Vermonters, and furthered that since then, he had been doing his best "to lead the effort for real criminal justice reform, so that we end the disgrace of having more people in jail than any other country".

=== Death penalty ===
Sanders has opposed the death penalty throughout his political career. In 1996, he voted against the Anti-Terrorism and Effective Death Penalty Act. In October 2015, he said: "I would rather have our country stand side-by-side with European democracies, rather than with countries like China, Iran, Saudi Arabia, and others who maintain the death penalty." After the Washington Supreme Court found the death penalty unconstitutional, Sanders praised the decision, and stated: "We can't properly reform our broken criminal justice system without ending the death penalty." On July 31, 2019, following Attorney General William Barr announcing that the United States federal government would resume the use of the death penalty for the first time in over twenty years, Sanders was a co-sponsor of a bill banning the death penalty.

=== LGBT rights ===
Throughout his political career, Sanders has historically supported LGBT rights. In a letter that he published in the early 1970s, when he was running for Governor of Vermont, Sanders called for abolishing all laws against homosexuality.

In the 1980s, Sanders supported the designation of the Burlington "Lesbian and Gay Pride Day" as the mayor of the city, and signed a resolution recommending all government levels to support gay rights.

In the House, Sanders voted against the Defense of Marriage Act in 1996, which defines marriage as between a man and a woman, and was signed by President Bill Clinton that same year. Sanders opposed "Don't ask, don't tell", the US policy on LGBT service members in the military, which prohibited talking about one's sexuality in the military, and was implemented in 1994 and ended in 2011.

Sanders openly first spoke out in favor of legalizing same-sex marriage in 2009. Before this, Vermont was the first state to legalize same-sex unions in 2000. In a 2006 interview, Sanders noted that Vermont had "led the way" in creating the civil unions law, but said it was "a very divisive debate". Asked whether Vermont should legalize full marriage rights for same-sex couples, he said: "Not right now, not after what we went through." At the same time, Sanders expressed opposition to the proposed Federal Marriage Amendment, which would have prohibited same-sex marriage in the US. Sanders voted against the amendment later that year. In 2009, Vermont also was the first state to legalize same-sex marriage by statute.

When the Supreme Court took up the issue in 2015, Sanders issued a statement re-affirming his support, saying gay Americans in every state should be allowed to marry: "Of course all citizens deserve equal rights. It's time for the Supreme Court to catch up to the American people and legalize gay marriage."

In September 2014, Sanders was one of 69 members of the US House and Senate to sign a letter to then-FDA commissioner Sylvia Burwell requesting that the FDA revise its policy banning donation of corneas and other tissues by men who have had sex with another man in the preceding 5 years.

In May 2017, Sanders was one of 46 senators to introduce the Equality Act of 2017, described by Representative David Cicilline as ensuring "that every LGBT person can live their lives free from the fear of discrimination".

In October 2018, Sanders was one of 20 senators to sign a letter to Secretary of State Mike Pompeo urging Pompeo to reverse the rolling back of a policy that granted visas to same-sex partners of LGBTQ diplomats who had unions which were not recognized by their home countries, writing that too many places around the world have seen LGBTQ individuals "subjected to discrimination and unspeakable violence, and receive little or no protection from the law or local authorities", and that the US refusing to let LGBTQ diplomats bring their partners to the US would be equivalent of America upholding "the discriminatory policies of many countries around the world".

In June 2019, Sanders was one of 18 senators to sign a letter to Secretary of State Mike Pompeo requesting an explanation of a decision by the State Department to not issue an official statement that year commemorating Pride Month, nor issue the annual cable outlining activities for embassies commemorating Pride Month. They also questioned why the LGBTI special envoy position had remained vacant, and asserted that "preventing the official flying of rainbow flags and limiting public messages celebrating Pride Month signals to the international community that the United States is abandoning the advancement of LGBTI rights as a foreign policy priority".

=== Immigration ===
Sanders believes a path to citizenship should be created for new immigrants. He voted for the comprehensive immigration reform bill in 2013, saying: "It does not make a lot of sense to me to bring hundreds of thousands of [foreign] workers into this country to work for minimum wage and compete with American kids." Sanders opposes guest worker programs, and is also skeptical about skilled immigrant (H-1B) visas, saying: "Last year, the top 10 employers of H-1B guest workers were all offshore outsourcing companies. These firms are responsible for shipping large numbers of American information technology jobs to India and other countries." In an interview with Vox, he stated his opposition to an open-borders immigration policy, describing it as:

... a right-wing proposal, which says essentially there is no United States ... you're doing away with the concept of a nation-state. What right-wing people in this country would love is an open-border policy. Bring in all kinds of people, work for $2 or $3 an hour, that would be great for them. I don't believe in that. I think we have to raise wages in this country, I think we have to do everything we can to create millions of jobs.

In 2006, Sanders voted for the Community Protection Act, which would have permitted "indefinite detention of specified dangerous aliens under orders of removal who cannot be removed, subject to review every six months". The bill was not passed in the Senate. That same year, he voted for an amendment to a Homeland Security appropriations bill prohibiting the federal government from contacting the Mexican government about American civilian groups, such as the Minutemen, that patrolled the US-Mexico border to stop undocumented immigrants from crossing, which a campaign representative described as one of many "nuisance amendments" and "a meaningless thing" in the view of the Customs and Border Patrol.

Regarding immigration detention, a joint letter dated June 2015 by 33 senators (including Gillibrand, Warren, and Booker) criticized that as "unacceptable and goes against our most fundamental values".

In March 2016, Sanders traveled to the US-Mexico border with Santa Cruz County Sheriff Tony Estrada and Representative Raul Grijalva, and pledged to expand both Deferred Action for Childhood Arrivals and Deferred Action for Parents of Americans, the latter of which was then being argued in court.

In February 2018, Sanders voted for bipartisan immigration legislation, admitting that it was "not the bill I would have written". He furthered: "What we should be doing is passing a clean DREAM Act with a pathway to citizenship for Dreamers and their parents. We also need to move forward and pass comprehensive immigration reform that will allow people to come out of the shadows and will unite families – not divide them."

In a May 2018 interview, Sanders said the Trump administration's immigration policy was "heartless", and that, while Americans believed the US "should move forward to comprehensive immigration reform", President Trump was "moving in exactly the wrong direction, and we see the cruelty of his immigration policies when you talk about the United States government separating children from their parents".

In August 2018, Sanders was one of seventeen senators to sign a letter spearheaded by Kamala Harris to United States Secretary of Homeland Security Kirstjen Nielsen, demanding that the Trump administration take immediate action in attempting to re-unite 539 migrant children with their families, citing each passing day of inaction as intensifying "trauma that this administration has needlessly caused for children and their families seeking humanitarian protection".

In July 2018, Sanders was one of eleven senators to sign a letter to the agencies responsible for re-uniting families, requesting them to provide weekly updates until every separated child was returned to their parents. The updates would be in the form of a list of separated children, a list of their parents, and a list connecting the two, as well as a briefing for lawmakers on the strategies used to re-unite families. Later that month, Sanders was one of twenty-two senators to sponsor the Stop Shackling and Detaining Pregnant Women Act, which, if enacted, would prohibit immigration officers from detaining pregnant women in a majority of circumstances and improve conditions of care for individuals in custody.

In November 2018, Sanders was one of eleven senators to sign a letter to United States Secretary of Defense James Mattis concerning "the overt politicization of the military", with the Trump administration's deployment of 5,800 troops to the U.S.-Mexico border, and requesting a briefing and written justification from the U.S. Northern Command for troop deployment, while urging Mattis to "curb the unprecedented escalation of DOD involvement in immigration enforcement".

In January 2019, Sanders was one of twenty senators to sponsor the Dreamer Confidentiality Act, a bill imposing a ban on the Department of Homeland Security (DHS) from passing information collected on DACA recipients to Immigration and Customs Enforcement (ICE), Customs and Border Protection (CBP), the Department of Justice, or any other law enforcement agency, with exceptions in the case of fraudulent claims, national security issues, or non-immigration related felonies being investigated.

In March 2019, Sanders voted to block President Trump's national emergency declaration that would have granted him access to $3.6 billion in military construction funding to build border barriers.

In April 2019, Sanders signed a letter led by Catherine Cortez Masto to Immigrations and Customs Enforcement and Customs and Border Enforcement, asserting that "the civil detention of an expectant mother for potential immigration offenses is never justified" due to the "absence of compelling evidence that the detention of a pregnant woman is necessary because she is a threat to herself or others, or is a threat to public safety or national security". The senators requested the CBP enact measures that would ensure "timely and appropriate treatment" for pregnant women in custody, along with both agencies providing information on how available facilities and doctors are for pregnant immigrants and complete data on the number of those currently in custody.

In April 2019, Sanders was one of 19 senators to sign a letter to top members on the Appropriations Committee Richard Shelby and Patrick Leahy, and top members of its Homeland Security subcommittee Shelley Moore Capito and Jon Tester, indicating that they could not "support the appropriation of funds that would expand this administration's unnecessarily cruel immigration enforcement policies, its inhumane immigrant detention systems, or its efforts to build the president's vanity projects", and urging Congress to "resist efforts to raid critical and effective public safety programs in order to pay for political theatrics", as President Trump's "manufactured emergency" was not justification for "spending taxpayer dollars on an ineffective wall".

In June 2019, following the Housing and Urban Development Department's confirmation that DACA recipients did not meet eligibility for federal backed loans, Sanders and eleven Democrats introduced The Home Ownership Dreamers Act, legislation that mandated that the federal government was not authorized to deny mortgage loans backed by the Federal Housing Administration, Fannie Mae, Freddie Mac, or the Agriculture Department solely due to the immigration status of an applicant.

In his remarks at a July 2019 forum hosted by the League of United Latin American Citizens, Sanders stated his administration would "provide immediate legal status to the 1.8 million young people eligible for the DACA program", and reform the immigration system of the US, which included offering a path to citizenship for the 11 million undocumented people in America.

Sanders opposed funding to ICE during the 2026 government shutdown, stating "[We] have got to end what amounts to Trump's domestic army, which is terrorizing communities all over this country."

=== Racial justice ===
Sanders was a civil rights organizer at the University of Chicago in the 1960s, and he has been given a 100% rating by the NAACP for his civil rights voting record. In 1988, Sanders worked for Jesse Jackson's presidential campaign, saying: "Jesse Jackson uniquely and alone has shown the courage to tackle the most important and basic issues facing working-class Americans, poor people, elderly people, environmentalists, peace activists, women, and America's minorities."

As part of his 2016 presidential platform, Sanders calls for an end to "the four central types of violence waged against black and brown Americans: physical, political, legal and economic". Speaking on these issues, Sanders says:

It is an obscenity that we stigmatize so many young Americans with a criminal record for smoking marijuana, but not one major Wall Street executive has been prosecuted for causing the near collapse of our entire economy. This must change. We must address the lingering unjust stereotypes that lead to the labeling of black youths as "thugs". We know the truth that, like every community in this country, the vast majority of people of color are trying to work hard, play by the rules and raise their children. It's time to stop demonizing minority communities.

During a Democratic debate, Sanders was asked: "Do black lives matter, or do all lives matter?", to which he responded, "Black lives matter", and went on to condemn actions he portrayed as racist policing and incarceration.

In his appearance at the She the People forum in Houston, Texas, on April 24, 2019, Sayu Bhojwani (founder and president of New American Leaders) asked Sanders in what way he believed the federal government should be involved in fighting "against the rise of white nationalism and white terrorist acts", and how Sanders would lead that effort if elected president. Sanders responded by criticizing what he said was President Trump's demagoguery, and further announced that he would do everything he could to help lead the United States "in a direction that ends all forms of discrimination - racial discrimination, gender discrimination, and discrimination based on people's sexual orientation". Sanders later furthered that his administration would have at the top of its agenda "the understanding that discrimination of all forms has got to end - period", and concluded: "If somebody wants to go around perpetrating hate crimes, that person will pay a very, very heavy price, indeed."

=== Reparations ===
In April 2019, Sanders was asked if he would support legislation by Representative Sheila Jackson Lee forming a commission to study the issue of reparations for African-Americans and confirmed he would sign it if elected president and in the event it passed in both chambers of Congress and stated his belief that there should be a study into the subject. Sanders called for "real attention to the most distressed communities in America" and the use of "10 percent of all federal funds to make sure that kids who need it get the education, get the jobs, get the environmental protection that they need".

On July 24, 2019, when asked if he supported reparations for slavery at the annual NAACP convention in Detroit, Michigan, Sanders said that he backed a plan put forth by South Carolina Representative Jim Clyburn to put significant investments in impoverished communities, citing his fear that Congress would give "the African American community a $20,000 check and then says that takes care of slavery and we don't have to worry about it anymore."

=== Church and state ===
Sanders is rated by Americans United for Separation of Church and State as strongly in favor of the separation of church and state.

=== Genetically-engineered food ===
In 2012, along with Senator Barbara Boxer, Sanders introduced an amendment which would have given states the right to require labels on food products which are genetically engineered. The bill has been passed by the House Agriculture Committee by a vote of 9–1, but not the full House.

=== Cannabis legalization ===
In October 2015, Sanders announced his support for removing cannabis from the Controlled Substances Act, to end federal prohibition of the drug and clear the way for it to be legalized at the state level unimpeded by the federal government. One week later Sanders introduced the Ending Federal Marijuana Prohibition Act, marking the first time that a bill to legalize cannabis had been filed in the U.S. Senate. Sanders also supports the sale and taxation of cannabis at the state level in a manner similar to alcohol and tobacco.

Sanders said in a July 2019 interview on The Joe Rogan Experience that he would sign an executive order to legalize cannabis as president. In October 2019 he released a comprehensive plan for legalization that included descheduling of cannabis within the first 100 days of his presidency.

=== Disaster relief ===
In October 2017, following Hurricane Maria and Hurricane Irma, Sanders signed a letter to Acting Secretary of Homeland Security Elaine Duke urging her "to provide all necessary resources to confirm that storm-related deaths are being counted correctly" given that President Trump seemed "to be using the number of fatalities to determine the quality of the disaster response".

In August 2018, Sanders was one of eight senators to sign a letter to the Federal Emergency Management Agency charging the agency with not assisting displaced homeowners in Puerto Rico in the aftermath of Hurricane Maria under the Individuals and Households (IHP) program by "alarming rates."

In March 2019, Sanders was one of 11 senators to sign a letter to congressional leaders urging them to "bring legislation providing disaster supplemental appropriations to your respective floors for consideration immediately" after noting that the previous year had seen 124 federal disaster declarations approved for states, territories, and tribal nations across the US.

=== Drugs ===
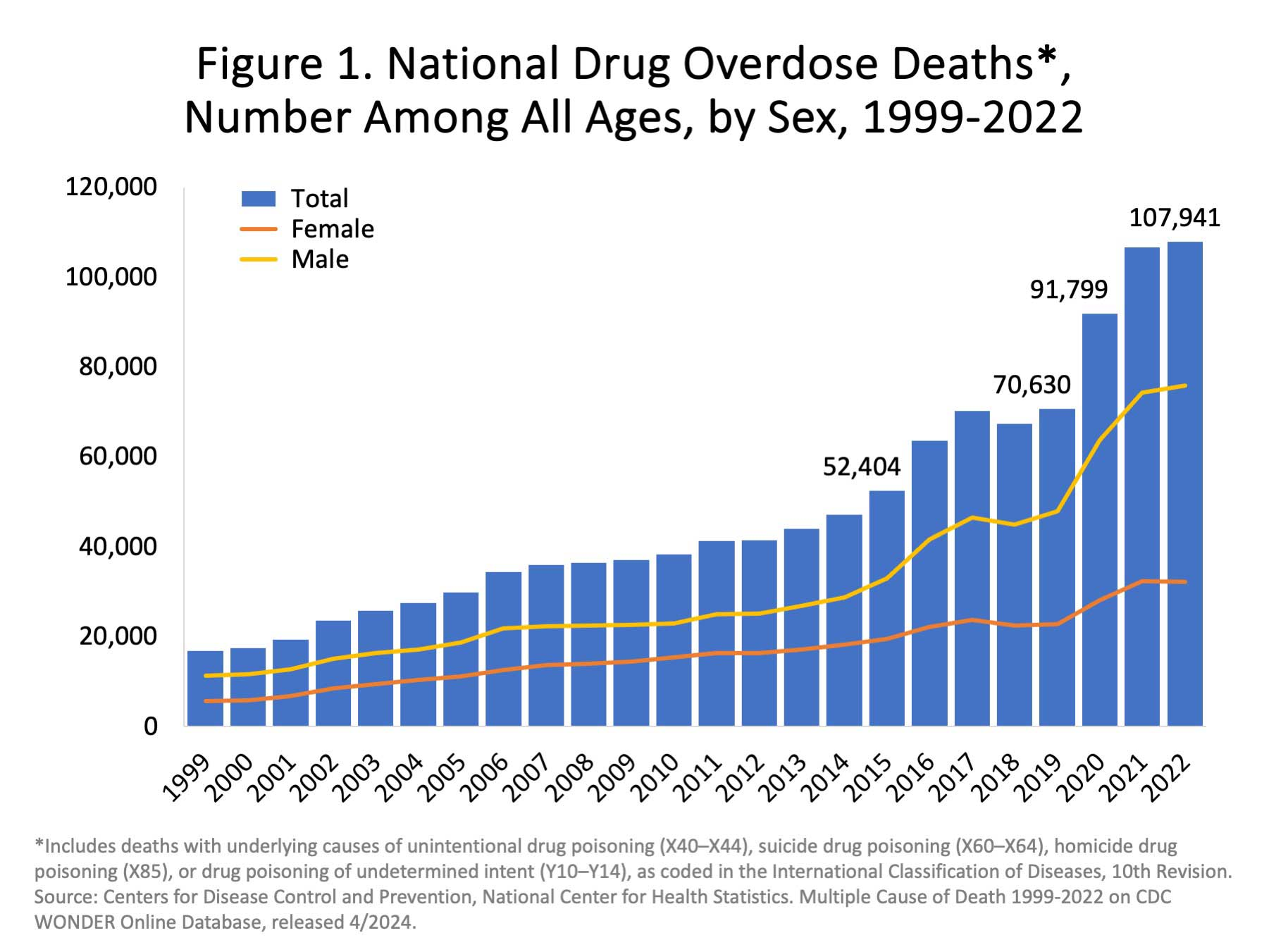
Yearly overdose deaths from all drugs in the United States

In July 2015, Sanders and Representative Elijah Cummings wrote a letter to the National Governors Association and National Association of Attorneys General, asserting that the "opioid abuse epidemic is a public health emergency that must be addressed, and no company should jeopardize the progress many states have made in tackling this emergency by overcharging for a critically important drug like naloxone".

In 2016, Sanders supported Proposition 61, dubbed the California Drug Price Relief Act, a measure preventing state agencies from purchasing prescription drugs for higher prices than the Department of Veterans Affairs pays, arguing that it would "be great for the taxpayers of California, and it will be a real blow against this greedy industry that will reverberate all over America".

On November 20, 2018, Sanders and Representative Ro Khanna unveiled a bill intended to abolish the monopoly from a company, regardless of any patents, and authorize other companies to compose cheaper generic versions of a drug in the event of the price for that drug being higher than the median price in Canada, the United Kingdom, Germany, France and Japan. Sanders said in a statement that the United States was the only country in the world that allowed "pharmaceutical companies to charge any price they want for any reason they want", and that the "greed of the prescription drug industry is literally killing Americans".

In February 2019, Sanders was one of 11 senators to sign a letter to insulin manufacturers Eli Lilly and Company, Novo Nordisk, and Sanofi over increased insulin prices and charging the price increases with having caused patients to lack "access to the life-saving medications they need."

In June 2019, Sanders was one of 15 senators to introduce the Affordable Medications Act, legislation intended to promote transparency through mandating pharmaceutical companies disclose the amount of money going toward research and development in addition to both marketing and executives' salaries. The bill also abolished the restriction that stopped the federal Medicare program from using its buying power to negotiate lower drug prices for beneficiaries and hinder drug company monopoly practices used to keep prices high and disable less expensive generics entering the market.

On August 1, 2019, following the Trump administration announcing a plan that would allow the importation of cheaper prescription drugs from other countries, Sanders released a statement in which he opined that there was "no rational reason why insulin and other life-saving medications should cost ten times more in the United States than Canada", and pledged that on the first day of his presidency, he would "direct the Secretary of Health and Human Services and FDA Commissioner to allow pharmacists, wholesalers, and patients to purchase FDA approved prescription drugs from Canada".

=== Workplace harassment ===
In April 2019, Sanders signed onto the Be HEARD Act, legislation intended to abolish the tipped minimum wage, along with ending mandatory arbitration and pre-employment non-disclosure agreements. The bill also gave workers additional time to report harassment, and was said by co-sponsor Patty Murray to come at a time when too many workers are "still silenced by mandatory disclosure agreements that prevent them from discussing sexual harassment and long-standing practices like the tipped wages that keep workers in certain industries especially vulnerable".

=== Election security ===
In May 2019, Sanders was one of 12 senators to co-sponsor the Protecting American Votes and Elections (PAVE) Act, legislation granting the United States Department of Homeland Security the authority "to set minimum cyber-security standards for U.S. voting machines, authorize a one-time $500 million grant program for states to buy ballot-scanning machines to count paper ballots, and require states to conduct risk-limiting audits of all federal elections in order to detect any cyber hacks".

=== Opioids ===
In February 2017, Sanders and 30 other senators signed a letter to Kaléo Pharmaceuticals in response to the opioid-overdose-reversing device Evzio rising in price from $690 in 2014 to $4,500 and requested the company answer what the detailed price structure for Evzio was, the number of devices Kaléo Pharmaceuticals set aside for donation, and the totality of federal reimbursements Evzio received in the previous year.

In March 2017, Sanders was one of 21 senators to sign a letter led by Ed Markey to Senate Majority Leader Mitch McConnell which noted that 12 percent of adult Medicaid beneficiaries had some form or a substance abuse disorder, in addition to one third of treatment administered for opioid and other substance use disorders in the United States being financed through Medicaid, and opined that the American Health Care Act could "very literally translate into a death spiral for those with opioid use disorders", due to the insurance coverage lacking and not having the adequate funds to afford care, oftentimes resulting in individuals abandoning substance use disorder treatment.

In September 2018, Sanders voted for a package of 70 Senate bills that cost $8.4 billion and altered programs across multiple agencies as part of a bipartisan effort to prevent opioids from being shipped through the U.S. Postal Service and grant doctors the ability to prescribe medications designed to wean opioid addictions.

=== United States Postal Service ===
In March 2019, Sanders was a co-sponsor of a bipartisan resolution led by Gary Peters and Jerry Moran that opposed privatization of the United States Postal Service (USPS), citing the USPS as an establishment that was self-sustained and noting concerns that a potential privatization could cause higher prices and reduced services for customers of USPS- with a particular occurrence in rural communities.

== Criticism of the Trump administration ==
=== Cabinet ===
On February 5, 2017, Sanders said Trump was a "fraud" for appointing multiple billionaires to his cabinet after committing during his campaign to tackle Wall Street, and predicted Trump would "sell out" the middle and working class. In Los Angeles, on February 19, Sanders called Trump "a pathological liar", and promised to defeat "Trump and Trumpism and the Republican right-wing ideology".

In February 2018, two days after Rob Porter stepped down as White House Staff Secretary, Sanders was one of twelve senators to sign a letter requesting the White House provide details on the allegations of domestic abuse against Porter.

In June 2018, during an appearance on CNN, Sanders stated that President Trump was going to war against the working class through his "budget, trillion-dollar cut in Medicaid proposal, $500 billion in Medicare, massive cuts in education, nutrition programs", and that he was not addressing the issues of "low wages, people can't afford health care, can't afford prescription drugs, can't afford to send their kids to college".

In July 2018, Sanders was one of four senators to sign a letter to the head of the anti-trust division of the Justice Department, Makan Delrahim, requesting a review of whether Comcast would be able to use 21st Century Fox's entertainment offerings to suppress competitors amid Comcast's bid to buy parts of 21st Century Fox, citing the need "to protect consumers from the harmful effects of the proposed merger".

In July 2018, Sanders was one of nine senators to vote against the nomination of Robert Wilkie as United States Secretary of Veterans Affairs, in the first non-unanimous vote in the office's history as a cabinet position.

=== Energy and climate ===
On March 30, 2017, two days after Trump signed an "Energy Independence" executive order, Sanders called Trump's choice to prioritize job creation over climate change "nonsensical, and stupid, and dangerous", and noted that scientists report that human activity is causing "devastating problems", while Trump and his allies believe climate change is a "hoax".

In May 2018, Sanders and Elizabeth Warren wrote a letter to President Trump, calling on the president to select an individual who takes climate change seriously as his next Homeland Security adviser, warning that without "a dedicated federal effort to reduce the quantity of greenhouse gasses that human activity releases into the atmosphere, climate change will continue to worsen and cause increasingly severe weather events, including hurricanes", and that climate change had previously and would continue to "have a tangible and harmful impact on our national security and disaster readiness".

In October 2018, after Director of the National Economic Council Larry Kudlow disputed a report by the United Nations warning the world to slash emissions by 45 percent before 2030 in order to avert the atmosphere possibly warming to 1.5 degrees Celsius, Sanders stated that they had "12 years to substantially cut the amount of carbon in our atmosphere, or this planet, our country, the rest of the world, is going to suffer irreversible damage." Sanders added that the Trump administration "virtually does not even recognize the reality of climate change" and was "making a bad situation worse" by working with the Fossil Fuel industry.

In November 2018, after the federal government released a report that found climate change had led to temperature increases and sea levels rising and warned that the effects of climate change would "lead to more intense wildfires, floods, and other disasters if left unchecked", Sanders called for Congress to "take Trump on, take the fossil fuel industry on, and transform our system to sustainable energy" which he asserted would result in the US leading the world in saving the planet and producing "millions of decent paying jobs". Sanders added that he was amazed the US had "an administration right now that still considers climate change to be a hoax" and that the issue was not up for debate given climate change's verification by the science community.

In May 2019, Sanders said that his most profound difference with President Trump on climate change policy was Trump "maintaining the myth that climate change is a hoax", and maintained that Trump was working to ensure the US had more carbon emissions. Sanders mocked Trump as "a profound scientist, someone who's researched the issue for years and uniquely came up with that conclusion", and alluded to Trump's comments the previous month in which the latter stated that the noise wind turbines emit cause cancer.

=== War and peace ===
In an April 7, 2017, statement, Sanders expressed disapproval of Trump's ordered airstrike on Syria from the previous day: "If there's anything we should've learned from the wars in Iraq and Afghanistan, in which the lives of thousands of brave American men and women and hundreds of thousands of Iraqi and Afghan civilians have been lost and trillions of dollars spent, it's that it's easier to get into a war than out of one."

=== Special Counsel investigation ===
In February 2017, Sanders was one of 26 senators to sign a letter to the Election Assistance Commission (EAC), requesting the commission detail cyber-security challenges to state and local officials amid their attempts to safeguard future elections, and also secure the 2016 election from Russian hackers.

In July 2018, following Special Counsel Robert Mueller's indictment of twelve Russian intelligence officers in the 2016 hacking of the DNC, Sanders said the indictments "strongly suggests that the interference was directed from the highest levels of the Russian government". Sanders advocated for Mueller to be allowed "to continue his investigation free of pressure", and called for President Trump to relay to Russian President Vladimir Putin that the United States would not tolerate Russian interference in either American elections or those of the country's allies.

In April 2019, after the Justice Department released a redacted version of the Mueller Report, Sanders released a statement, saying in part: "It is clear that Donald Trump wanted nothing more than to shut down the Mueller investigation. While we have more detail from today's report than before, Congress must continue its investigation into Trump's conduct and any foreign attempts to influence our election." Sanders also called for work to be done that would ensure the protection of "our future elections from the significant threat of foreign interference", and requested President Trump and Republican leadership cease their obstruction of "the necessary work to protect our democracy".

== Interest group ratings ==
Bernie Sanders' ratings from advocacy organizations
Group	Advocacy issue(s)	Rating	Year
ACLU	Civil and political rights	100%	2014
AFBF	Agriculture	83%	2014
AFL–CIO	Labor unions	100%	2013
AFT	Education	86%	2012
ARA	Senior citizens	100%	2014
DPA	Drug policy	83%	2006
HRC	LGBTQ rights	100%	2014
LCV	Environment	100%	2015
LULAC	Immigration reform, liberal	100%	2013–14
LWV	Civic engagement	89%	2007
MPP	Marijuana legalization	66%	2016
NAACP	Minorities and affirmative action	100%	2014
NARAL	Abortion, pro-choice	100%	2014
NFU	Farmers' union	90%	2012
NRA-PVF	Gun ownership, conservative	14%	2012
NRLC	Anti-abortion	0%	2015
NTU	Tax policy, conservative	5%	2013
NumbersUSA	Immigration reform, conservative	44%	2015–16
PA West	Foreign affairs	75%	2014
PPFA	Reproductive health	100%	2014
SEIU	Service union	100%	2012
