= Elizabeth Warren =

American politician (born 1949)

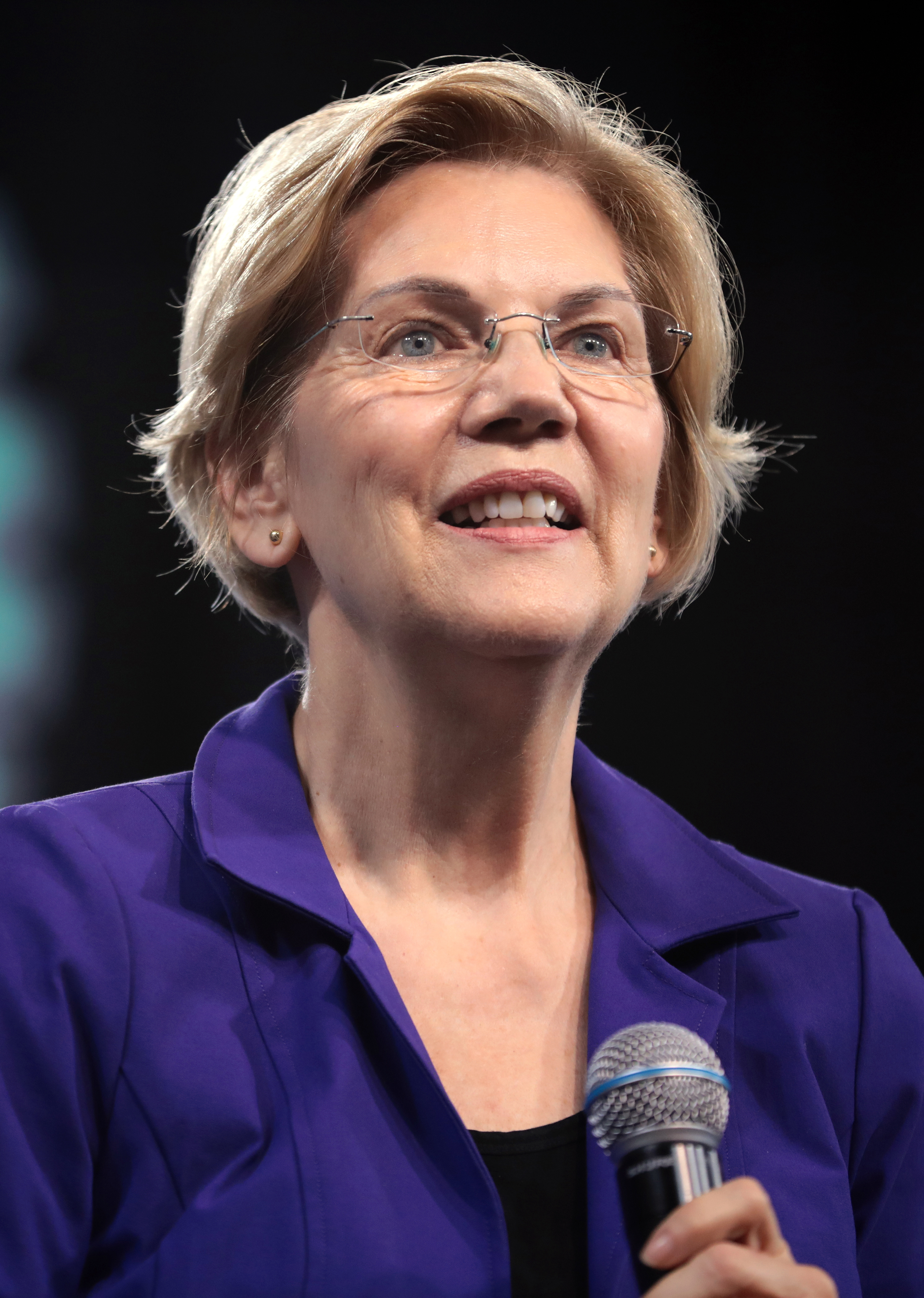
- Warren in 2020

United States Senator from Massachusetts
- Incumbent
- Assumed office January 3, 2013 Serving with Ed Markey
- Preceded by: Scott Brown

Ranking Member of the Senate Banking Committee
- Incumbent
- Assumed office January 3, 2025
- Preceded by: Tim Scott

Vice Chair of the Senate Democratic Caucus
- Incumbent
- Assumed office January 3, 2017 Serving with Mark Warner
- Leader: Chuck Schumer
- Preceded by: Chuck Schumer

Special Advisor for the Consumer Financial Protection Bureau
- In office September 17, 2010 – August 1, 2011
- President: Barack Obama
- Preceded by: Position established
- Succeeded by: Raj Date

Chair of the Congressional Oversight Panel
- In office November 25, 2008 – November 15, 2010
- Deputy: Damon Silvers
- Preceded by: Position established
- Succeeded by: Ted Kaufman

Personal details
- Born: Elizabeth Ann Herring; June 22, 1949 (age 77) Oklahoma City, Oklahoma, U.S.
- Party: Democratic (1996–present)
- Other political affiliations: Republican (1991–1996)
- Spouses: Jim Warren (m. 1968; div. 1978); Bruce H. Mann (m. 1980)
- Children: 2, including Amelia
- Education: University of Houston (BS); Rutgers University (JD)
- Website: Senate website Campaign website
- Warren's voice Warren questioning witnesses on private equity firms and increased rental prices Recorded August 2, 2022

Elizabeth Ann Warren (née Herring; born June 22, 1949) is an American politician and former law professor serving as the senior United States senator from Massachusetts, a seat she has held since 2013. A member of the Democratic Party and regarded as a progressive, Warren has focused on consumer protection, equitable economic opportunity, and the social safety net while in the Senate. Warren was also a candidate in the 2020 Democratic Party presidential primaries, ultimately finishing third after Joe Biden and Bernie Sanders.

Born and raised in Oklahoma, Warren is a graduate of the University of Houston and Rutgers Law School. She has taught law at several universities, including the University of Houston, the University of Texas at Austin, the University of Pennsylvania, and Harvard University, with expertise in bankruptcy and commercial law. Warren has written 12 books and more than 100 articles.

Warren's first foray into public policy began in 1995, when she worked to oppose what eventually became a 2005 act restricting bankruptcy access for individuals. During the late 2000s, her national profile grew when she took forceful public stances in favor of more stringent banking regulations after the 2008 financial crisis. She chaired the Congressional Oversight Panel of the Troubled Asset Relief Program, and proposed and established the Consumer Financial Protection Bureau, for which she served as the first special advisor under President Barack Obama.

In 2012, Warren defeated incumbent Republican Scott Brown and became the first female U.S. senator from Massachusetts. She was reelected by a wide margin in 2018, defeating Republican nominee Geoff Diehl. On February 9, 2019, Warren announced her candidacy in the 2020 United States presidential election. She was briefly considered the front-runner for the Democratic nomination in late 2019, but support for her campaign dwindled. She withdrew from the race on March 5, 2020, after Super Tuesday. She was reelected to a third Senate term in 2024 against Republican nominee John Deaton.

== Early life and education ==
Warren was born Elizabeth Ann Herring in Oklahoma City on June 22, 1949. She is the fourth child of Pauline Louise (née Reed, 1912–1995), a homemaker, and Donald Jones Herring (1911–1997), a U.S. Army flight instructor during World War II, both of whom were members of the evangelical branch of the Protestant Methodist Church. Warren has described her early family life as teetering "on the ragged edge of the middle class" and "kind of hanging on at the edges by our fingernails." She and her three older brothers were raised Methodist.

Warren lived in Norman, Oklahoma, until she was 11 years old, when her family moved back to Oklahoma City. When she was 12, her father, then a salesman at Montgomery Ward, had a heart attack, which led to many medical bills as well as a pay cut because he could not do his previous work. After leaving his sales job, he worked as a maintenance man for an apartment building. Eventually, the family's car was repossessed because they failed to make loan payments. To help the family finances, her mother found work in the catalog-order department at Sears. When she was 13, Warren started waiting tables at her aunt's restaurant.

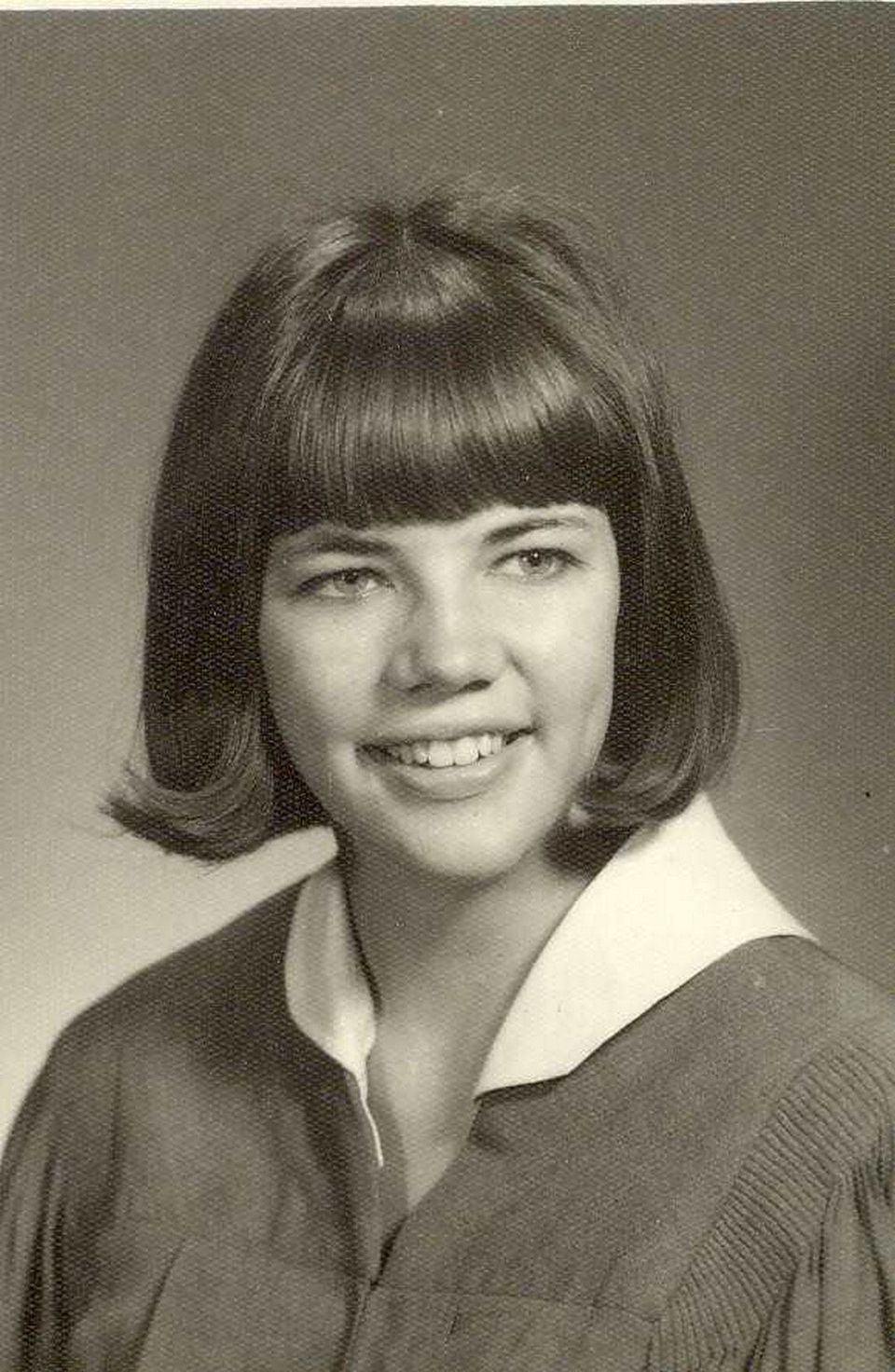
Warren's high school graduation photo

Warren became a star member of the debate team at Northwest Classen High School and won the state high school debating championship. She also won a debate scholarship to George Washington University (GWU) at the age of 16. She initially aspired to be a teacher, but left GWU after two years in 1968 to marry James Robert "Jim" Warren, whom she had met in high school.

Warren and her husband moved to Houston, where he was employed by IBM. She enrolled in the University of Houston and graduated in 1970 with a Bachelor of Science degree in speech pathology and audiology.

The Warrens moved to New Jersey when Jim received a job transfer. She soon became pregnant and decided to stay at home to care for their daughter, Amelia. After Amelia turned two, Warren enrolled at Rutgers Law School. She received her Juris Doctor in 1976 and passed the bar examination shortly thereafter. Shortly before graduating, Warren became pregnant with their second child, Alexander.

== Career ==
In 1970, after obtaining a degree in speech pathology and audiology, but before enrolling in law school, Warren taught children with disabilities for a year in a public school. During law school, she worked as a summer associate at Cadwalader, Wickersham & Taft. After receiving her Juris Doctor and passing the bar examination, Warren offered legal services from home, writing wills and doing real estate closings.

In the late 1970s, 1980s, and 1990s, Warren taught law at several American universities while researching issues related to bankruptcy and middle-class personal finance. She became involved with public work in bankruptcy regulation and consumer protection in the mid-1990s.

=== Academic ===
Warren began her career in academia as a lecturer at Rutgers University, Newark School of Law (1977–1978). She then moved to the University of Houston Law Center (1978–1983), where she became an associate dean in 1980 and obtained tenure in 1981. She taught at the University of Texas School of Law as visiting associate professor in 1981 and returned as a full professor two years later (staying from 1983 to 1987). She was a research associate at the Population Research Center of the University of Texas at Austin from 1983 to 1987 and was also a visiting professor at the University of Michigan in 1985. During this period, Warren also taught Sunday school.

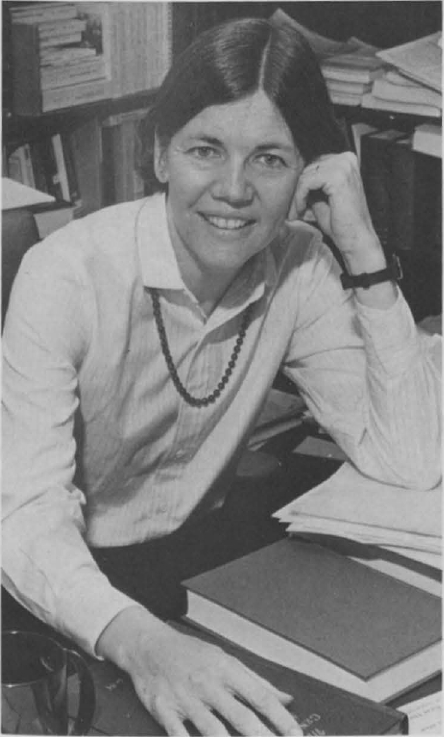
Warren in University of Texas School of Law's 1987 yearbook

Warren's earliest academic work was heavily influenced by the law and economics movement, which aimed to apply neoclassical economic theory to the study of law with an emphasis on economic efficiency. One of her articles, published in 1980 in the Notre Dame Law Review, argued that public utilities were over-regulated and that automatic utility rate increases should be instituted. But Warren soon became a proponent of on-the-ground research into how people respond to laws. Her work analyzing court records and interviewing judges, lawyers, and debtors, established her as a rising star in the field of bankruptcy law. According to Warren and economists who follow her work, one of her key insights was that rising bankruptcy rates were caused not by profligate consumer spending but by middle-class families' attempts to buy homes in good school districts. Warren worked in this field alongside colleagues Teresa A. Sullivan and Jay Westbrook, and the trio published their research in the book As We Forgive Our Debtors in 1989. Warren later recalled that she had begun her research believing that most people filing for bankruptcy were either working the system or had been irresponsible in incurring debts, but that she concluded that such abuse was in fact rare and that the legal framework for bankruptcy was poorly designed, describing the way the research challenged her fundamental beliefs as "worse than disillusionment" and "like being shocked at a deep-down level". In 2004, she published an article in the Washington University Law Review in which she argued that correlating middle-class struggles with over-consumption was a fallacy.

Warren joined the University of Pennsylvania Law School as a full professor in 1987 and obtained an endowed chair in 1990, becoming the William A. Schnader Professor of Commercial Law. In 1992, she taught for a year at Harvard Law School as the Robert Braucher Visiting Professor of Commercial Law. In 1995, Warren left Penn to become Leo Gottlieb Professor of Law at Harvard Law School. In 1996, she became the highest-paid professor at Harvard University who was not an administrator, with a $181,300 salary and total compensation of $291,876, including moving expenses and an allowance in lieu of benefits contributions. As of 2011, she was Harvard's only tenured law professor who had attended law school at an American public university. Warren was a highly influential law professor. She published in many fields, but her expertise was in bankruptcy and commercial law. From 2005 to 2009, Warren was among the three most-cited scholars in those fields.

Warren began to rise in prominence in 2004 with an appearance on the Dr. Phil show, and published several books including The Two-Income Trap.

=== Advisory roles ===
In 1995, the National Bankruptcy Review Commission's chair, former congressman Mike Synar, asked Warren to advise the commission. Synar had been a debate opponent of Warren's during their school years. She helped draft the commission's report and worked for several years to oppose legislation intended to severely restrict consumers' right to file for bankruptcy. Warren and others opposing the legislation were not successful; in 2005, Congress passed the Bankruptcy Abuse Prevention and Consumer Protection Act of 2005, which curtailed consumers' ability to file for bankruptcy.

From 2006 to 2010, Warren was a member of the FDIC (Federal Deposit Insurance Corporation) Advisory Committee on Economic Inclusion. She is a member of the National Bankruptcy Conference, an independent organization that advises the U.S. Congress on bankruptcy law, a former vice president of the American Law Institute and a member of the American Academy of Arts and Sciences.

Warren's scholarship and public advocacy were the impetus for establishing the Consumer Financial Protection Bureau in 2011.

=== TARP oversight ===
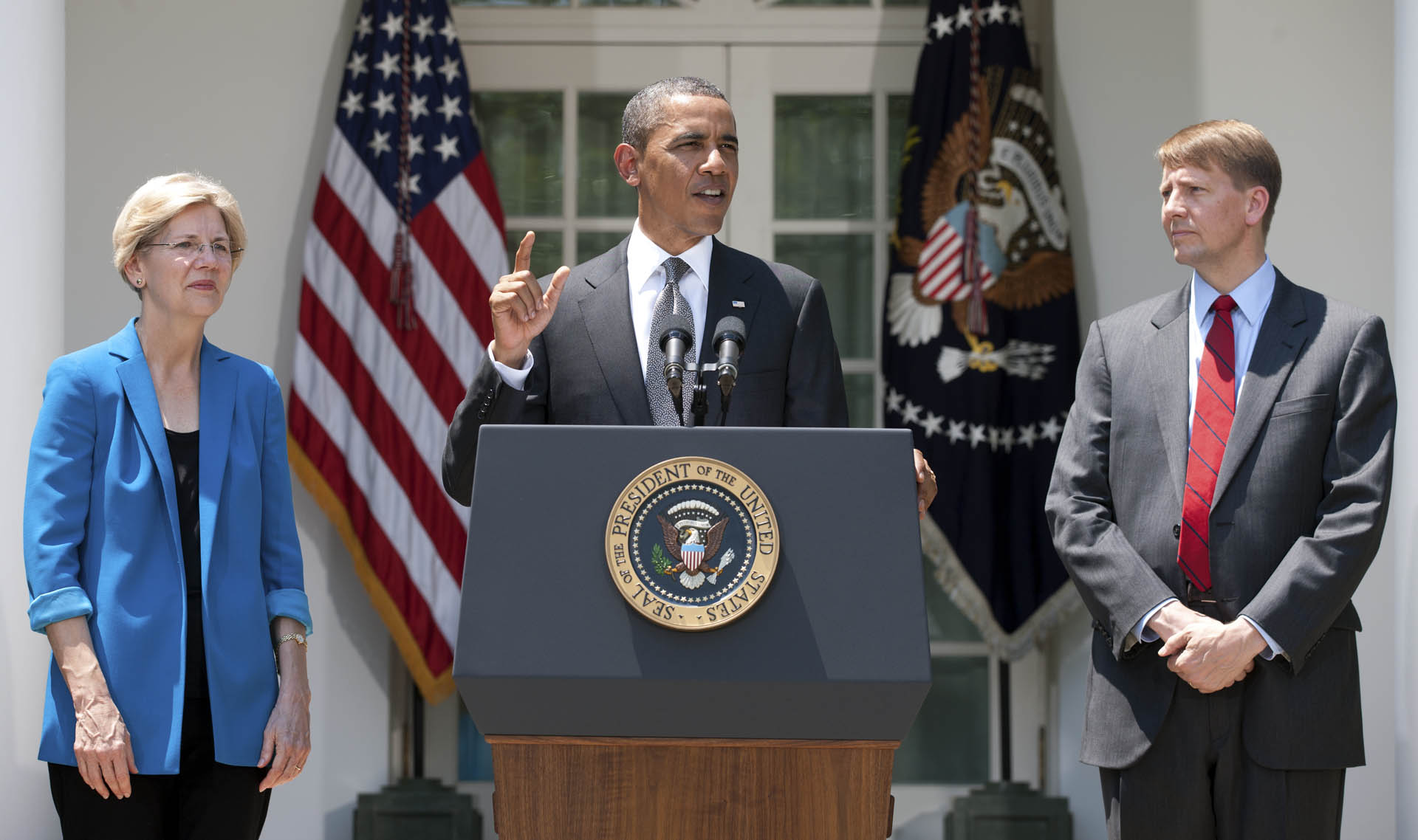
Warren standing next to President Barack Obama as he announces Richard Cordray's nomination as the first director of the CFPB, July 2011

On November 14, 2008, U.S. Senate majority leader Harry Reid appointed Warren to chair the five-member Congressional Oversight Panel created to oversee the implementation of the Emergency Economic Stabilization Act. The panel released monthly oversight reports evaluating the government bailout and related programs. During Warren's tenure, these reports covered foreclosure mitigation, consumer and small business lending, commercial real estate, AIG, bank stress tests, the impact of the Troubled Asset Relief Program (TARP) on the financial markets, government guarantees, the automotive industry and other topics.

=== Consumer Financial Protection Bureau ===
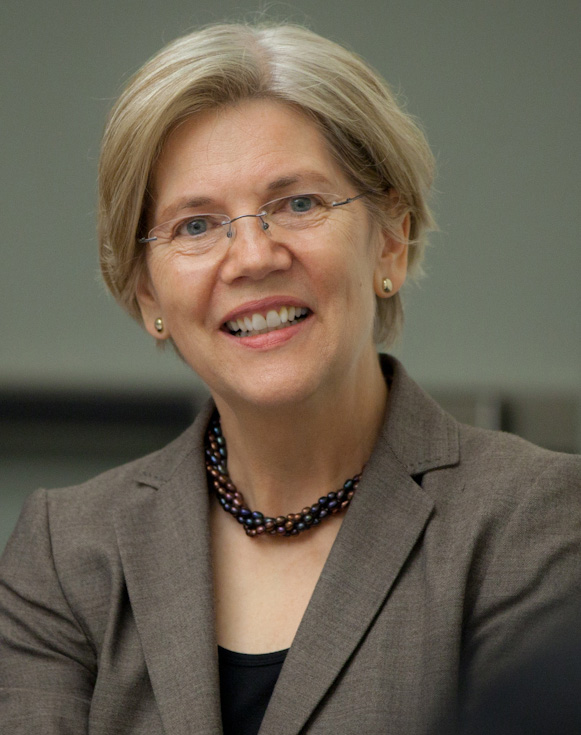
Warren discussing the work of the Consumer Financial Protection Bureau at the ICBA conference in 2011

Warren was an early advocate for creating a new Consumer Financial Protection Bureau (CFPB). The bureau was established by the Dodd–Frank Wall Street Reform and Consumer Protection Act, signed into law by President Obama in July 2010. In September 2010, Obama named Warren Assistant to the President and Special Advisor to the Secretary of the Treasury on the CFPB to set up the new agency. While liberal groups and consumer advocacy groups urged Obama to formally nominate Warren as the agency's director, financial institutions and Republican members of Congress strongly opposed her, believing she would be an overly zealous regulator. Reportedly convinced that Warren could not win Senate confirmation as the bureau's first director, in January 2012, Obama appointed former Ohio attorney general Richard Cordray to the post in a recess appointment over Republican senators' objections.

=== Political affiliation ===
A close high-school friend told Politico in 2019 that in high school Warren was a "diehard conservative" and that she had since done a "180-degree turn and an about-face". One of her colleagues at the University of Texas in Austin said that at university in the early 1980s Warren was "sometimes surprisingly anti-consumer in her attitude". Gary L. Francione, who had been a colleague of hers at the University of Pennsylvania, recalled in 2019 that when he heard her speak at the time she was becoming politically prominent, he "almost fell off [his] chair... She's definitely changed". Warren was registered as a Republican from 1991 to 1996 and voted Republican for many years. "I was a Republican because I thought that those were the people who best supported markets", she has said. But she has also said that in the six presidential elections before 1996 she voted for the Republican nominee only once, in 1976, for Gerald Ford.

Warren has said that she began to vote Democratic in 1995 because she no longer believed that the Republicans were the party who best supported markets, but she has said she has voted for both parties because she believed neither should dominate. According to Warren, she left the Republican Party because it is no longer "principled in its conservative approach to economics and to markets" and is instead tilting the playing field in favor of large financial institutions and against middle-class American families.

== U.S. Senate (2013–present) ==
2012 Senate election results by municipality

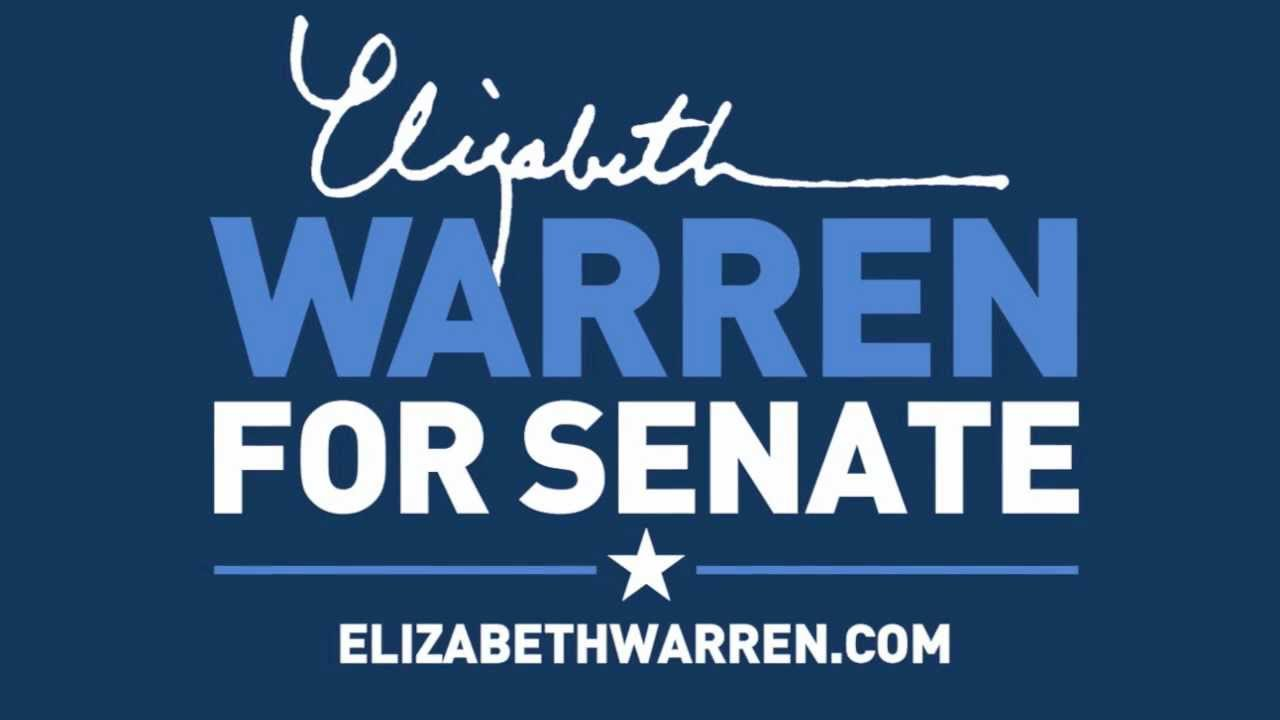
Senate campaign logo

=== Elections ===
==== 2012 ====
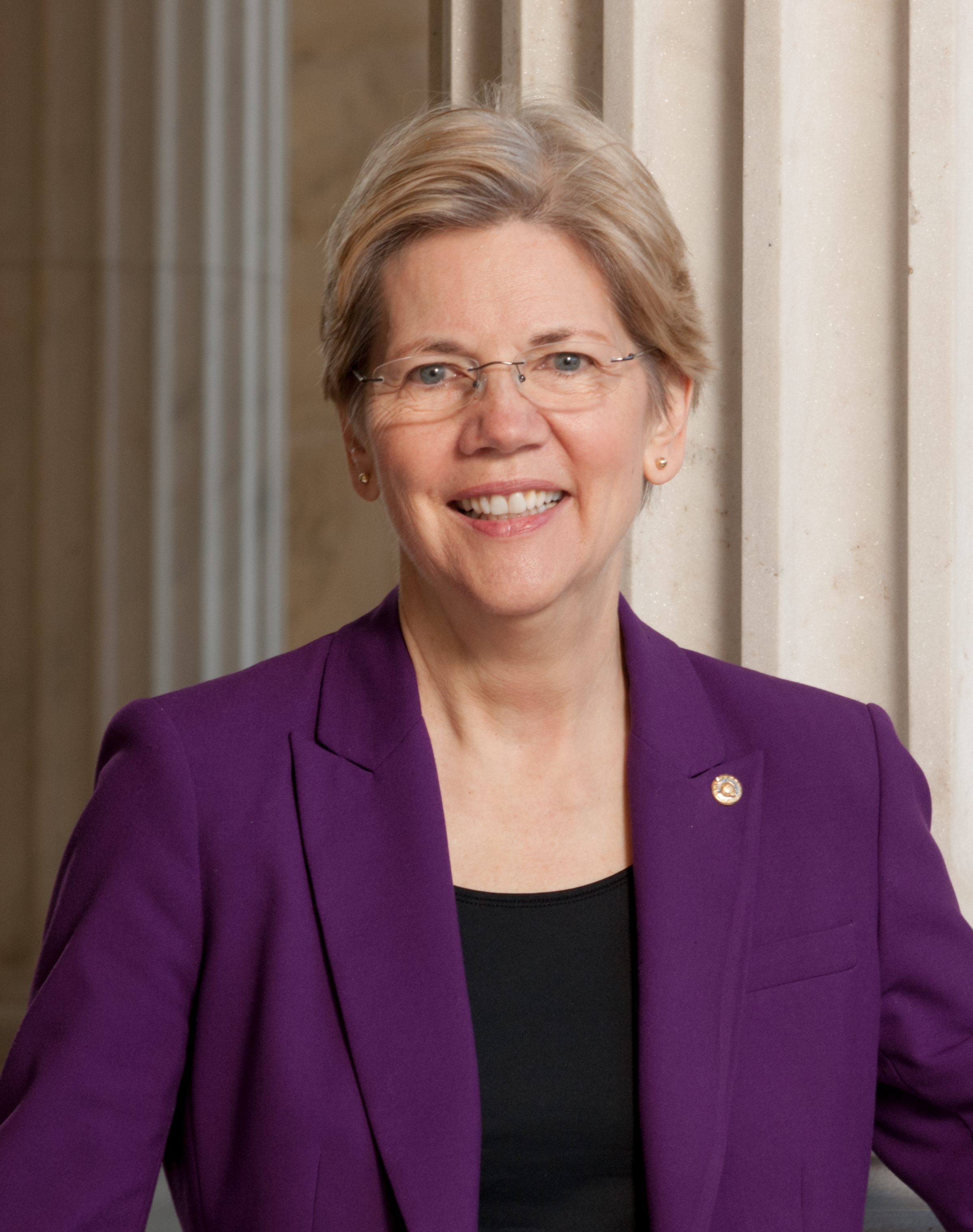
Warren during 113th Congress

On September 14, 2011, Warren declared her intention to run for the Democratic nomination for the 2012 election in Massachusetts for the U.S. Senate. Republican Scott Brown had won the seat in a 2010 special election after Ted Kennedy's death. A week later, a video of Warren speaking in Andover went viral on the Internet. In it, Warren responds to the charge that asking the rich to pay more taxes is "class warfare" by saying that no one grew rich in the U.S. without depending on infrastructure paid for by the rest of society:

There is nobody in this country who got rich on his own. Nobody. ... You moved your goods to market on the roads the rest of us paid for; you hired workers the rest of us paid to educate; you were safe in your factory because of police forces and fire forces that the rest of us paid for. You didn't have to worry that marauding bands would come and seize everything at your factory, and hire someone to protect against this, because of the work the rest of us did. Now look, you built a factory and it turned into something terrific, or a great idea. God bless. Keep a big hunk of it. But part of the underlying social contract is, you take a hunk of that and pay forward for the next kid who comes along.

President Obama later echoed her sentiments in a 2012 election campaign speech.

Warren ran unopposed for the Democratic nomination and won it on June 2, 2012, at the state Democratic convention with a record 95.77% of the votes of delegates. She encountered significant opposition from business interests. In August, the political director for the U.S. Chamber of Commerce commented that "no other candidate in 2012 represents a greater threat to free enterprise than Professor Warren". Warren nonetheless raised $39 million for her campaign, more than any other Senate candidate in 2012, and showed, according to The New York Times, "that it was possible to run against the big banks without Wall Street money and still win".

Warren received a prime-time speaking slot at the 2012 Democratic National Convention on September 5, 2012. She positioned herself as a champion of a beleaguered middle class that "has been chipped, squeezed, and hammered". According to Warren, "People feel like the system is rigged against them. And here's the painful part: They're right. The system is rigged." Warren said Wall Street CEOs "wrecked our economy and destroyed millions of jobs" and that they "still strut around congress, no shame, demanding favors, and acting like we should thank them".

On November 6, 2012, Warren defeated Brown with 53.7% of the vote. She was the first woman ever elected to the U.S. Senate from Massachusetts, and became part of a sitting U.S. Senate that had 20 women senators in office, the most in Senate history at the time.

==== 2018 ====
On January 6, 2017, in an email to supporters, Warren announced that she would be running for a second term as a U.S. senator from Massachusetts, writing, "The people of Massachusetts didn't send me to Washington to roll over and play dead while Donald Trump and his team of billionaires, bigots, and Wall Street bankers crush the working people of our Commonwealth and this country. ... This is no time to quit."

In the 2018 election, Warren defeated Republican nominee Geoff Diehl, 60% to 36%.

==== 2024 ====
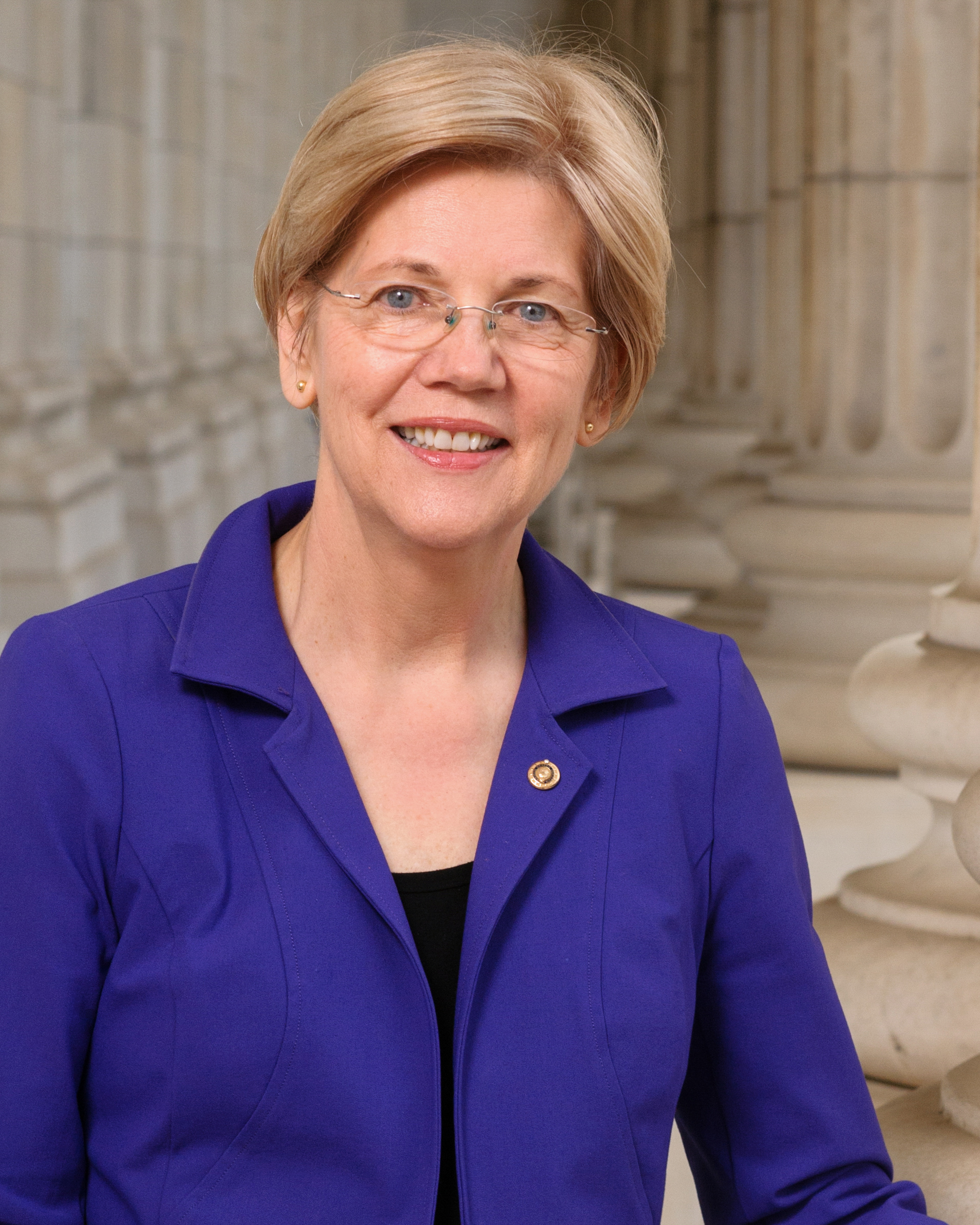
Warren during 114th Congress

Warren won a third Senate term, defeating Republican nominee John Deaton, an attorney, 59.6% to 40.4%. This election marked the first time that Warren had lost Bristol County while running for the office. Warren underperformed Kamala Harris, who won the state by 25 points in the concurrent presidential election, as well as every county.

=== Tenure ===
Vice President Joe Biden swore Warren in as a senator on January 3, 2013.

In December 2012, Warren had been assigned a seat on the Senate Banking Committee, which oversees the implementation of Dodd–Frank and other regulation of the banking industry. At Warren's first Banking Committee hearing in February 2013, she pressed several banking regulators to say when they had last taken a Wall Street bank to trial and said, "I'm really concerned that 'too big to fail' has become 'too big for trial'." Videos of Warren's questioning amassed more than one million views in a matter of days. At a March Banking Committee hearing, Warren asked Treasury Department officials why criminal charges were not brought against HSBC for its money laundering practices. Warren compared money laundering to drug possession, saying: "If you're caught with an ounce of cocaine, the chances are good you're going to go to jail ... But evidently, if you launder nearly a billion dollars for drug cartels and violate our international sanctions, your company pays a fine and you go home and sleep in your own bed at night."

In May 2013, Warren sent letters to the Justice Department, the Securities and Exchange Commission, and the Federal Reserve questioning their decisions that settling would be more fruitful than going to court. Also in May, saying that students should get "the same great deal that banks get", Warren introduced the Bank on Student Loans Fairness Act, which would allow students to take out government education loans at the same rate that banks pay to borrow from the federal government, 0.75%. Independent senator Bernie Sanders endorsed her bill, saying: "The only thing wrong with this bill is that [she] thought of it and I didn't". By the following year, Warren's attempts to pass any student loan reform were blocked.

During the 2014 election cycle, Warren was a top Democratic fundraiser. After the election, Warren was appointed to become the first-ever Strategic Adviser of the Democratic Policy and Communications Committee, a position created for her. The appointment added to speculation that Warren would run for president in 2016.

Warren's "A minimum-wage job saved my family" speech at the Economic Policy Institute, November 2015 (3:28)

In early 2015, President Obama urged Congress to approve the Trans-Pacific Partnership, a proposed free trade agreement between the United States and 11 Asian and South American countries. Warren criticized the TPP, arguing that the dispute resolution mechanism in the agreement and labor protections for American workers therein were insufficient; her objections were in turn criticized by Obama.

Saying "despite the progress we've made since 2008, the biggest banks continue to threaten our economy", in July 2015 Warren, John McCain, Maria Cantwell, and Angus King reintroduced the 21st Century Glass–Steagall Act, a modern version of the Banking Act of 1933. The legislation was intended to reduce the American taxpayer's risk in the financial system and the likelihood of future financial crises.

In a September 20, 2016, hearing, Warren called on Wells Fargo CEO John Stumpf to resign, adding that he should be "criminally investigated" over Wells Fargo's opening of two million checking and credit-card accounts without the customers' consent.

In December 2016, Warren gained a seat on the Senate Armed Services Committee, which The Boston Globe called "a high-profile perch on one of the chamber's most powerful committees" that would "fuel speculation about a possible 2020 bid for president".

During the debate on Senator Jeff Sessions's nomination for United States attorney general in February 2017, Warren quoted a letter Coretta Scott King had written Senator Strom Thurmond in 1986 when Sessions was nominated for a federal judgeship. King wrote, "Mr. Sessions has used the awesome power of his office to chill the free exercise of the vote by black citizens in the district he now seeks to serve as a federal judge. This simply cannot be allowed to happen." Senate Republicans voted that by reading the letter from King, Warren had violated Senate Rule 19, which prohibits impugning another senator's character. This prohibited Warren from further participating in the debate on Sessions's nomination, and Warren instead read King's letter while streaming live online. In rebuking Warren, Senate Majority Leader Mitch McConnell said on the Senate floor, "She was warned. She was given an explanation. Nevertheless, she persisted." McConnell's language became a slogan for Warren and others.

On October 3, 2017, during Wells Fargo chief executive Timothy J. Sloan's appearance before the Senate Banking Committee, Warren called on him to resign, saying, "At best you were incompetent, at worst you were complicit."

On July 17, 2019, Warren and Representative Al Lawson introduced legislation that would make low-income college students eligible for benefits under the Supplemental Nutrition Assistance Program (SNAP) according to the College Student Hunger Act of 2019.

In November 2020, Warren was named a candidate for Secretary of the Treasury in the Biden Administration.

Warren was at the Capitol to participate in the 2021 United States Electoral College vote count when Trump supporters attacked the Capitol. She called it an "attempted coup and act of insurrection egged on by a corrupt president to overthrow our democracy", and the perpetrators "domestic terrorists." The day after the attack, Warren joined the entire Massachusetts Congressional delegation to call for Trump's immediate removal from office through the invocation of the Twenty-fifth Amendment to the United States Constitution or impeachment.

Throughout 2024 and 2025, Warren supported the IRS Direct File effort.

On August 1, 2025, Warren and Sen. John Kennedy introduced the Build Now Act, a bill that would incentivize local governments to build more homes by requiring the Department of Housing and Urban Development to remove 10 percent of Community Development Block Grant funding from cities that fail to improve their rate of homebuilding above the national median and reallocate that money to cities that exceeded the national median rate of home building. The Build Now Act became part of the 21st Century ROAD to Housing Act, which became law on July 11, 2026. Warren, as ranking member of the Senate Banking Committee, was the lead negotiator of the legislative package.

On September 16, 2026, Warren and Senators Ron Wyden and Jeff Merkley introduced the Stop Corporate Takeovers of Physicians Act, with Representatives Val Hoyle, Alexandria Ocasio-Cortez, and Suhas Subramanyam introducing it in the House as H.R. 10444. The bill would create a federal ban on the corporate practice of medicine, prohibiting private equity funds, insurance companies, and other for-profit corporations from owning or controlling a medical practice unless licensed clinicians hold a majority of its ownership and governance, with exceptions for nonprofit and public providers and for hospitals. It would bar the management services organizations through which investors commonly contract with physician-owned practices from controlling a practice through a "friendly" or "captive" physician owner or directing its hiring, compensation, scheduling, billing and contracting; prohibit most non-compete, non-disclosure and non-disparagement agreements; and be enforced by the Federal Trade Commission, state attorneys general and physicians through a private right of action for treble damages. The bill is modeled on a 2025 Oregon law restricting corporate control of medical practices. Its sponsors said more than 80 percent of American physicians were employed by corporate entities, up from 62 percent in 2019, and Warren said, "Patients want to know that decisions about their health are being made by their doctors, not by Wall Street investors." All the bill's sponsors are Democrats, and a Holland & Knight analysis said that near-term enactment would require significant additional congressional action.

Warren was rated among the top 10 most popular senators in an April 2024 poll by Morning Consult.

Warren is a member of the Fight Club in the Senate.

=== Role in the 2016 presidential election ===
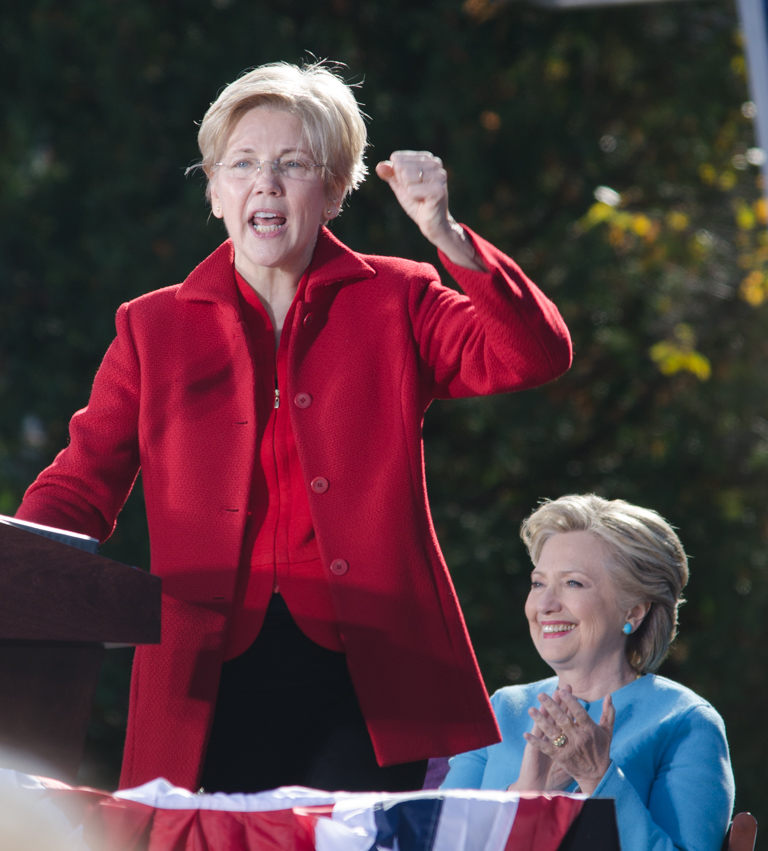
Warren stumps for Hillary Clinton in Manchester, New Hampshire, October 2016

Warren speaks at 2016 Democratic National Convention in July 2016

In the run-up to the 2016 United States presidential election, supporters put Warren forward as a possible presidential candidate, but she repeatedly said she would not run for president in 2016. In October 2013, she joined the other 15 women Democratic senators in signing a letter that encouraged Hillary Clinton to run. There was much speculation about Warren being added to the Democratic ticket as a vice-presidential candidate. On June 9, 2016, after the California Democratic primary, Warren formally endorsed Clinton for president. In response to questions when she endorsed Clinton, Warren said that she believed herself to be ready to be vice president, but she was not being vetted. On July 7, CNN reported that Warren was on a five-person short list to be Clinton's running mate. Clinton eventually chose Tim Kaine.

Until her June endorsement, Warren was neutral during the Democratic primary but made public statements that she was cheering Bernie Sanders on. In June, Warren endorsed and campaigned for Clinton. She called Donald Trump, the presumptive Republican nominee, dishonest, uncaring, and "a loser".

=== 119th United States Congress Committee assignments ===
==== Current ====
- Committee on Armed Services
  - Subcommittee on Personnel (Ranking Member)
  - Subcommittee on Readiness and Management Support
  - Subcommittee on Strategic Forces
- Committee on Banking, Housing, and Urban Affairs (Ranking Member)
  - Subcommittee on Digital Assets
  - Subcommittee on Economic Policy
  - Subcommittee on Financial Institutions and Consumer Protection
  - Subcommittee on Housing, Transportation, and Community Development
  - Subcommittee on National Security and International Trade and Finance
  - Subcommittee on Securities, Insurance, and Investment
- Committee on Finance
- Special Committee on Aging

== 2020 presidential campaign ==
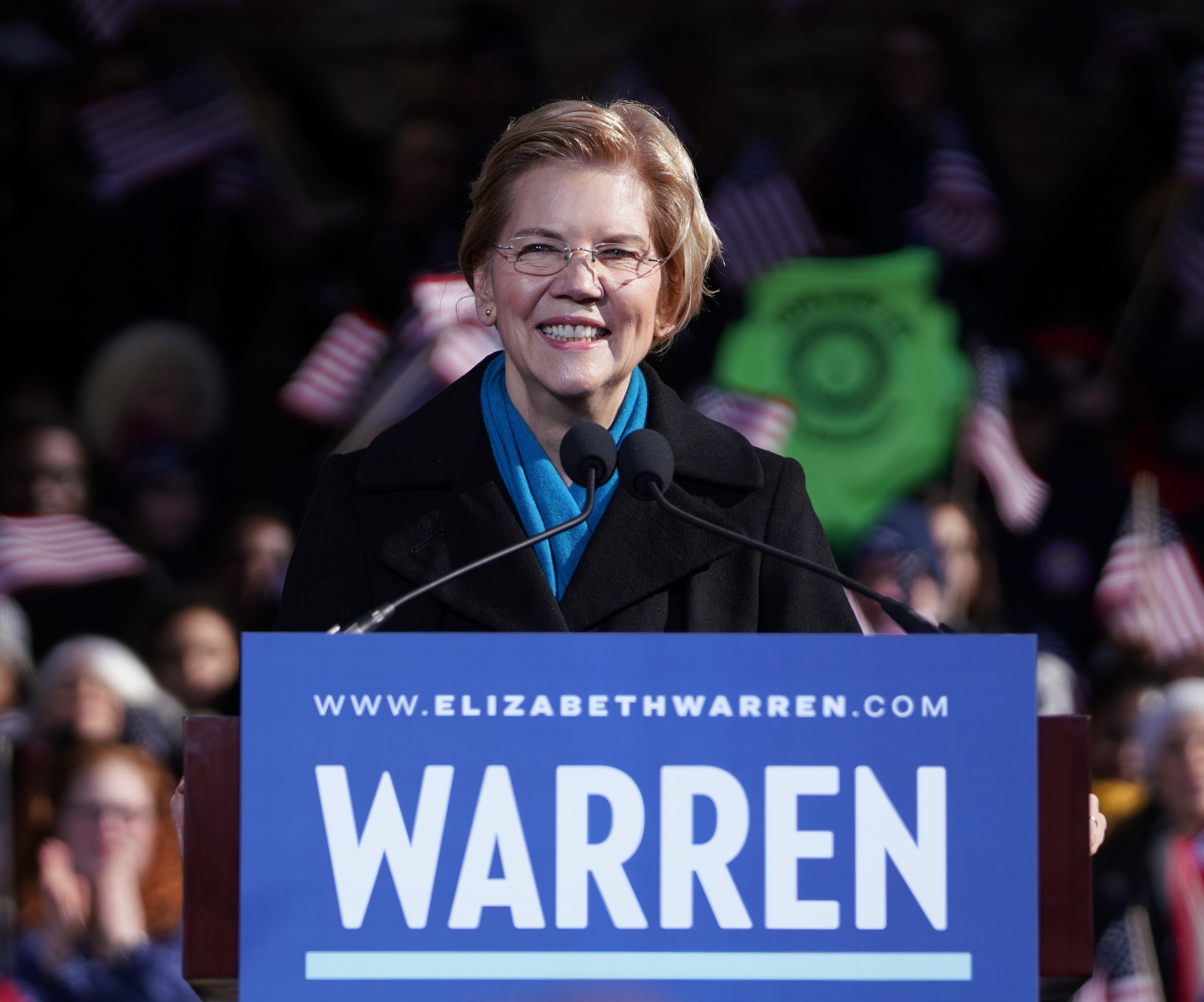
Warren while formally declaring her candidacy in Lawrence, Massachusetts, on February 9, 2019

At a town hall meeting in Holyoke, Massachusetts, on September 29, 2018, Warren said she would "take a hard look" at running for president in the 2020 election after the 2018 United States elections concluded. On December 31, 2018, Warren announced that she was forming an exploratory committee to run for president.

On February 9, 2019, Warren officially announced her candidacy at a rally in Lawrence, Massachusetts, at the site of the 1912 Bread and Roses strike. A longtime critic of President Trump, Warren called him a "symptom of a larger problem [that has resulted in] a rigged system that props up the rich and powerful and kicks dirt on everyone else".

Warren staged her first campaign event in Lawrence to demonstrate the constituency groups she hopes to appeal to, including working class families, union members, women, and new immigrants. She called for major changes in government:

It won't be enough to just undo the terrible acts of this administration. We can't afford to just tinker around the edges—a tax credit here, a regulation there. Our fight is for big, structural change. This is the fight of our lives. The fight to build an America where dreams are possible, an America that works for everyone.

Following her candidacy announcement, Warren became known for the number and depth of her policy proposals, including plans to assist family farms by addressing the advantages held by large agricultural conglomerates, plans to reduce student loan debt and offer free tuition at public colleges, a plan to make large corporations pay more in taxes and better regulate large technology companies, several proposals inspired by opposition to President Trump, a plan to utilize economic patriotism, and plans to address opioid addiction. One of her signature plans was a wealth tax, dubbed the "Ultra-Millionaire Tax", on fortunes over $50 million. Warren was credited with popularizing the idea of a wealth tax with Americans, leading competitor Bernie Sanders to release a wealth tax plan. "I have a plan for that" began to develop as a catchphrase for Warren's campaign, and her campaign store began selling merchandise displaying the phrase.

After the ninth debate of the 2020 Democratic primaries, on February 19, Warren received considerable media coverage for her scolding of fellow candidate Mike Bloomberg. She criticized Bloomberg's non-transparent tax records, recently publicized claims of misogyny and sexism toward women, and history of redlining poor neighborhoods. Warren then pressed Bloomberg about the non-disclosure agreements some of his female associates are bound by, demanding they be nullified so that the women could come forward and share their experiences.

After several defeats at the polls, including a third-place finish in Massachusetts's Democratic primary, Warren ended her campaign on March 5, 2020.

=== Polls ===
In early June 2019, Warren placed second in some polls, with Joe Biden in first place and Bernie Sanders in third. In the following weeks her poll numbers steadily increased, and a September Iowa poll placed her in the lead with 22% to Biden's 20%. The Iowa poll also rated the number of voters at least considering voting for each candidate; Warren scored 71% to Biden's 60%. Poll respondents also gave her a higher "enthusiasm" rating, with 32% of her backers extremely enthusiastic to Biden's 22%.

An October 24 Quinnipiac poll placed Warren in the lead at 28%, with Biden at 21% and Sanders at 15%. When asked which candidate had the best policy ideas, 30% of respondents named Warren, with Sanders at 20% and Biden 15%. Sanders was most often named as the candidate who "cares most about people like you," with Warren in second place and Biden third. Sanders also placed first at 28% when respondents were asked which candidate was the most honest, followed by Warren and Biden at 15% each.

=== Funding ===
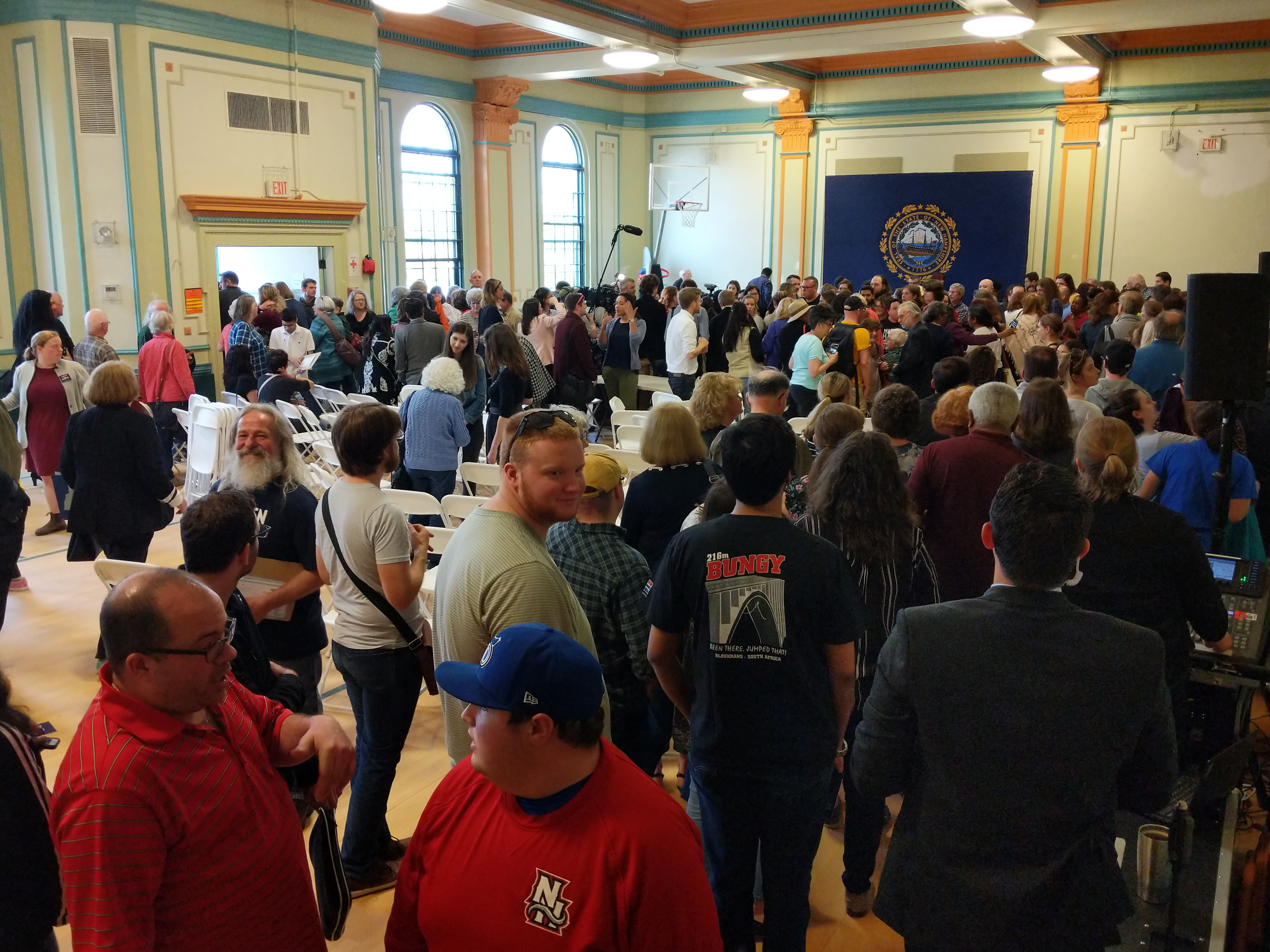
Selfie line for Elizabeth Warren after a May 19, 2019, campaign event in Nashua, New Hampshire

The Los Angeles Times reported that of the front-runners in the presidential race, only Sanders and Warren have previously won an election with almost exclusively small online contributions, and that no presidential primary in recent history has had two of the top three candidates refuse to use bundlers or hold private fundraisers with wealthy donors.

In January 2019, Warren said that she took no PAC money. In October 2019, Warren announced that her campaign would not accept contributions of more than $200 from executives at banks, large tech companies, private equity firms, or hedge funds, in addition to her previous refusal to accept donations of over $200 from fossil fuel or pharmaceutical executives.

In the third quarter of 2019, Warren's campaign raised $24.6 million, just less than the $25.3 million Sanders's campaign raised and well ahead of Joe Biden, the front-runner in the polls, who raised $15.2 million. Warren's average donation was $26; Sanders's was $18.

In February 2020, Warren began accepting support from Super PACs, after failing to convince other Democratic presidential candidates to join her in disavowing them.

=== Public appearances ===
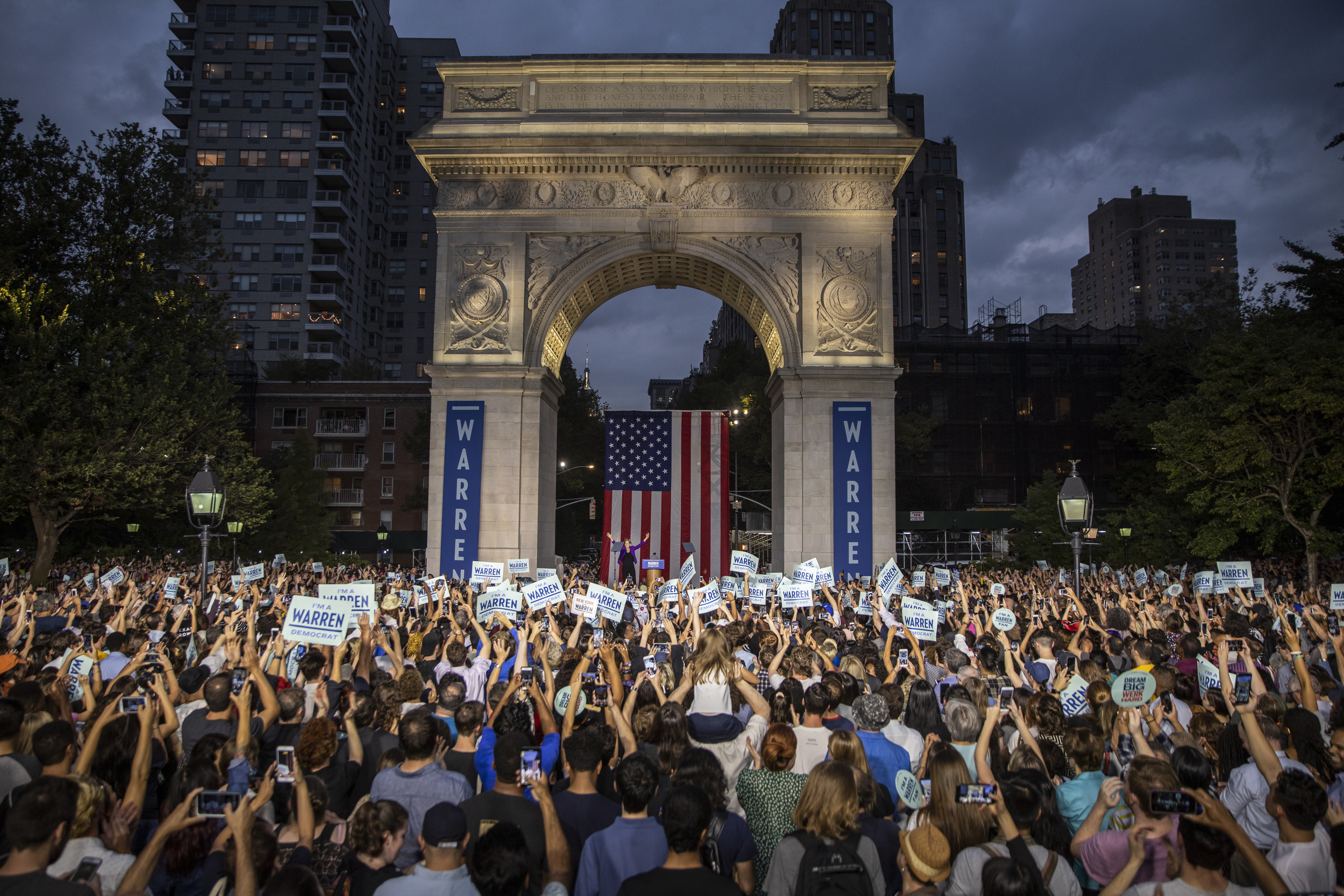
A crowd of 20,000 attended Warren's rally in Washington Square Park.

As of September 2019, Warren had attended 128 town halls. She is known for remaining afterward to talk with audience members and for the large numbers of selfies she has taken with them. On September 17, over 20,000 people attended a Warren rally at New York City's Washington Square Park. After her speech long lines formed with people waiting as long as four hours for selfies.

Due to the impeachment trial of Donald Trump, Warren was unable to make final campaign stops in person and opted to send her dog Bailey to meet with voters in Iowa.

=== Vice-presidential speculation ===
In June 2020, CNN reported that Warren was among the top four vice-presidential choices for Joe Biden, the presumptive Democratic presidential nominee, along with Mayor Keisha Lance Bottoms, Representative Val Demings, and Senator Kamala Harris. Kamala Harris was officially announced as Biden's running mate on August 11, 2020. On August 13, The New York Times reported that Warren was one of Biden's four finalists along with Harris, Susan Rice, and Gretchen Whitmer.

In late April, CNBC reported that big-money donors were pressuring Biden not to choose Warren, preferring other candidates purportedly on his list, such as Harris, Whitmer, and Amy Klobuchar.

== Personal life ==
Warren was married to Jim Warren from 1968 to 1978. Two years after their divorce, Warren married law professor Bruce H. Mann on July 12, 1980, but kept her first husband's surname. Warren has three grandchildren through her daughter Amelia.

On April 23, 2020, Warren announced on Twitter that her eldest brother, Don Reed Herring, had died of COVID-19 two days earlier. On October 1, 2021, she announced that her brother, John Herring, had died of cancer.

As of 2019, according to Forbes Magazine, Warren's net worth was $12 million.

For 2022, she and her husband reported a combined income of $1 million; her salary as U.S. Senator only accounts for a fifth of that sum. As of early 2025, TheStreet.com estimates her net worth at least $8 million.

== Political positions ==
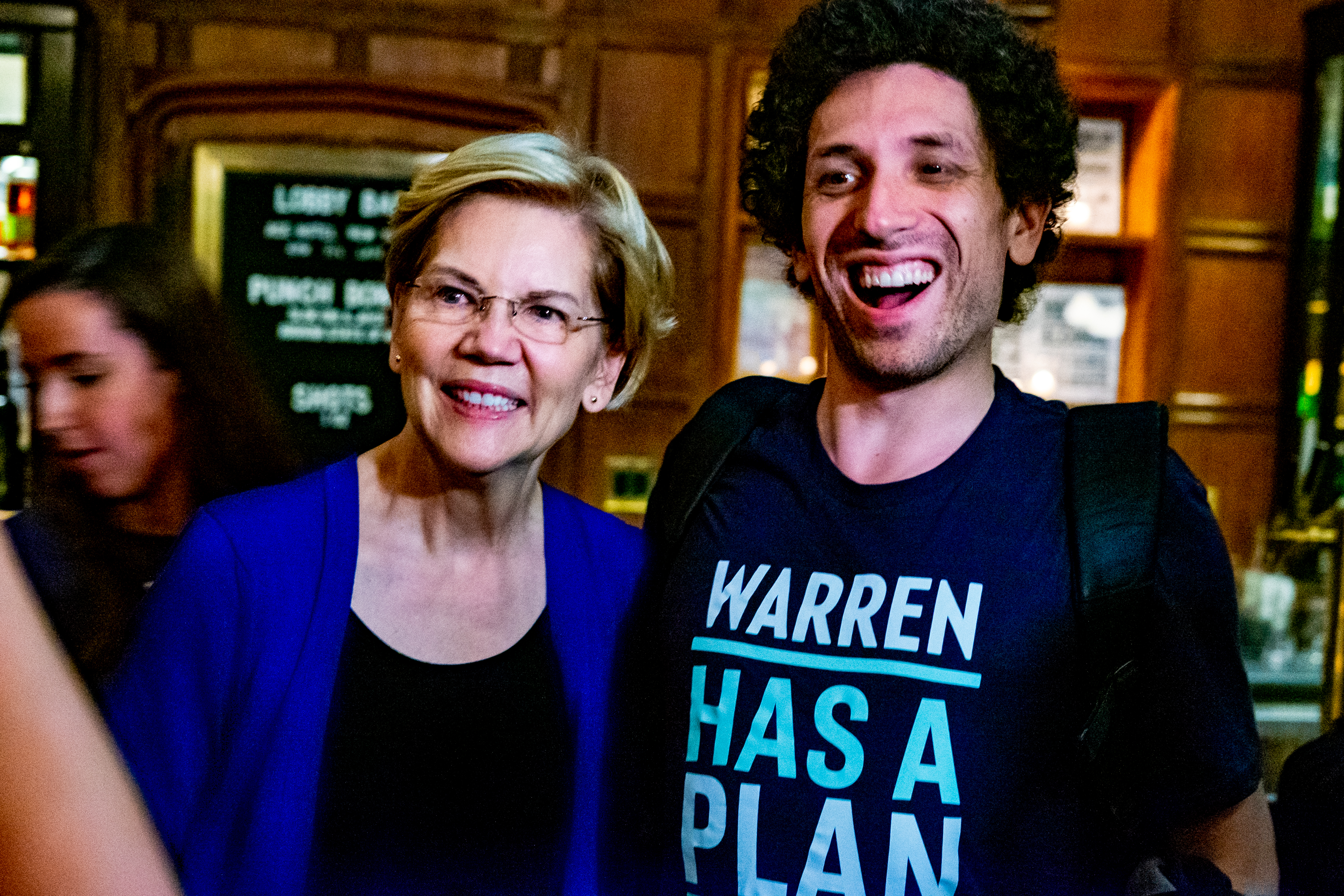
Warren with a supporter wearing a "Warren has a plan for that" T-shirt. The phrase became an internet meme during her presidential run.

Warren is widely regarded as a progressive. In 2012, the British magazine New Statesman named Warren among the "top 20 U.S. progressives".

In July 2014, at the Netroots Nation conference, Warren outlined her "Eleven Commandments of Progressivism": stronger Wall Street regulation and enforcement; protection of the earth through science; real net neutrality; a higher minimum wage to end full-time poverty; support for fast-food workers' livable wage demands; debt-free education; protection of Social Security, Medicare, and pensions for dignified retirement; equal pay for equal work; equality in marriage, the workplace, and all of America; immigration reform; and the view that corporations are not people, with women having rights to their bodies.

Warren supports worker representation on corporations' board of directors, breaking up monopolies, stiffening sentences for white-collar crime, a Medicare for All plan to provide health insurance for all Americans, and a higher minimum wage.

Warren is highly critical of the Trump administration. She expressed concerns over what she says were Trump's conflicts of interest. The Presidential Conflicts of Interest Act, written by Warren, was first read in the Senate in January 2017. Warren was highly critical of Trump's immigration policies. In 2018, she called for abolishing U.S. Immigration and Customs Enforcement (ICE).

Warren has criticized U.S. involvement in the Saudi Arabian-led intervention in Yemen in support of Yemen's government against the Houthis. In January 2019, Warren criticized Trump's decision to withdraw U.S. troops from Syria and Afghanistan. She agreed that U.S. troops should be withdrawn from Syria and Afghanistan but said such withdrawals should be part of a "coordinated" plan formed with U.S. allies.

In April 2019, after reading the Mueller report, Warren called on the House of Representatives to begin impeachment proceedings against Trump, saying, "The Mueller report lays out facts showing that a hostile foreign government attacked our 2016 election to help Donald Trump and Donald Trump welcomed that help. Once elected, Donald Trump obstructed the investigation into that attack."

After the June 24, 2022, ruling in which the Supreme Court overturned Roe v. Wade, Warren wrote a New York Times op-ed requesting that President Biden unblock "critical resources and authority that states and the federal government can use to meet the surge in demand for reproductive health services".

In 2022, Warren voted to advance legislation to codify same-sex marriage into federal law by voting for the Respect for Marriage Act.

On March 13, 2023, Warren presented a detailed analysis of the collapse of Silicon Valley Bank on March 10, 2023, and provided possible solutions to avoid further bank failures, in The New York Times.

Warren supports a two-state solution to the Israeli–Palestine conflict. In March 2024, she was one of 19 Democratic senators to sign a letter to the Biden administration urging the U.S. to recognize a "non-militarized" Palestinian state after the war in Gaza.

Warren has been critical of concentrated animal feeding operations (CAFOs), sometimes called factory farms. In 2019, she said she supported a federal moratorium on CAFO construction and expansion, and cosponsored a bill to prohibit the construction of new CAFOs and phase out existing operations by 2040.

In March 2026, Warren called the U.S. and Israeli war against Iran dangerous and illegal.

In August 2026, Warren questioned Treasury Secretary Scott Bessent about the U.S. government's intervention in the Japanese yen, seeking information about the Treasury Department's use of the Exchange Stabilization Fund, the size and execution of the transaction, and its legal basis.

== Ancestry and Native American claims ==
According to Warren and her brothers, older family members told them during their childhood that they had some Native American ancestry. In 2012, she said, "being Native American has been part of my story, I guess, since the day I was born". In 1984, Warren contributed recipes to a Native American cookbook and identified herself as Cherokee. Warren is not a part of any native tribes and does not hold any tribal citizenship.

During Warren's first Senate race in 2012, her opponent, Scott Brown, speculated that she had fabricated Native ancestry to gain advantage on the employment market and used Warren's ancestry in several attack ads. Warren has denied that her alleged heritage gave her any advantages in her schooling or her career. Several colleagues and employers (including Harvard) have said her reported ethnic status played no role in her hiring. From 1995 to 2004, her employer, Harvard Law School, listed her as a Native American in its federal affirmative action forms; Warren later said she was unaware of this.

The Washington Post reported that in 1986, Warren identified her race as "American Indian" on a State Bar of Texas write-in form used for statistical information gathering, but added that there was "no indication it was used for professional advancement". A 2018 Boston Globe investigation found that her reported ethnicity played no role in her rise in the academic legal profession, and concluded there was "clear evidence, in documents and interviews, that her claim to Native American ethnicity was never considered by the Harvard Law faculty, which voted resoundingly to hire her, or by those who hired her to four prior positions at other law schools", and that "Warren was viewed as a white woman by the hiring committees at every institution that employed her". In February 2019, Warren apologized for having identified as Native American.

Throughout his first term in office, President Donald Trump mocked Warren for her assertions of Native American ancestry and pejoratively called her "Pocahontas". At a July 2018 Montana rally, he promised that if he debated Warren, he would pay $1 million to her favorite charity if she took a DNA test and "it shows you're an Indian". In October 2018, Warren released an analysis of a DNA test by geneticist Carlos D. Bustamante that found her ancestry to be mostly European but "strongly support[ed] the existence of an unadmixed Native American ancestor", likely "in the range of 6 to 10 generations ago". According to The Boston Globe, this puts Warren somewhere between 1/64 and 1/1024 (0.09% to 1.5%) Native American. Other geneticists, while not disputing the test's validity, found the underlying science "flawed" due to the lack of Native Americans in the United States in the database. Geneticists Krystal Tsosie and Matthew Anderson called the interpretation of the test "problematic", citing, among other reasons, "Warren's motives, and the genetic variants informing the comparison". They added: "because Bustamante used Indigenous individuals from Central and South America as a reference group to compare Warren's DNA, we believe he should have stated only that Warren potentially had an 'Indigenous' ancestor 6-10 generations ago, not conclusively a 'Native American' one. The distinction might seem hypercritical to most, but to the sovereign tribal nations of the United States it's an important one."

After publicizing Bustamante's interpretation of the test, Warren asked Trump to donate the money to the National Indigenous Women's Resource Center. Trump responded: "I didn't say that. I think you better read it again". The Cherokee Nation criticized Warren, saying, "Using a DNA test to lay claim to any connection to the Cherokee Nation or any tribal nation, even vaguely, is inappropriate and wrong." According to Politico, "Warren's past claims of American Indian ancestry garnered fierce criticism from both sides of the aisle", with "tribal leaders calling out Warren for claiming a heritage she did not culturally belong to."

During a January 2019 public appearance in Sioux City, Iowa, Warren was asked by an attendee, "Why did you undergo the DNA testing and give Donald more fodder to be a bully?" She responded in part, "I am not a person of color; I am not a citizen of a tribe. Tribal citizenship is very different from ancestry. Tribes, and only tribes, determine tribal citizenship, and I respect that difference." She later privately contacted leadership of the Cherokee Nation to apologize "for furthering confusion over issues of tribal sovereignty and citizenship and for any harm her announcement caused". Cherokee Nation executive director of communications Julie Hubbard said that Warren understands "that being a Cherokee Nation tribal citizen is rooted in centuries of culture and laws not through DNA tests". Warren apologized again in August 2019 before a Native American Forum in Iowa.

In February 2019, Warren received a standing ovation during a surprise visit to a Native American conference, where she was introduced by freshman Representative Deb Haaland (D-NM), one of the first two Native American women elected to the U.S. Congress. Haaland endorsed Warren for president in July 2019, calling her "a great partner for Indian Country".

== Honors and awards ==
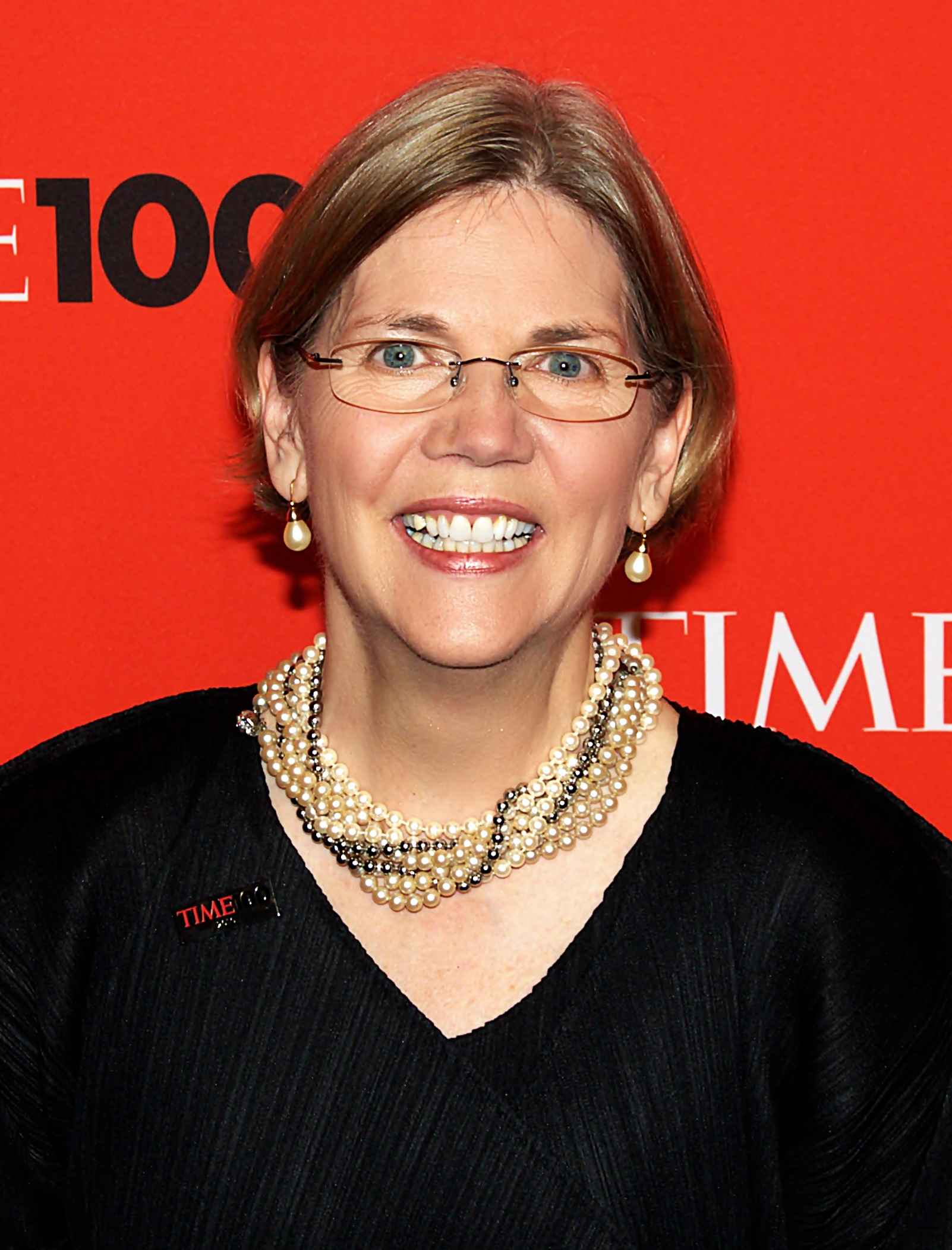
Warren at the 2009 Time 100 Gala

In 2009, The Boston Globe named Warren the Bostonian of the Year, and the Women's Bar Association of Massachusetts honored her with the Lelia J. Robinson Award. The National Law Journal has repeatedly named Warren one of the Fifty Most Influential Women Attorneys in America, and in 2010 named her one of the 40 most influential attorneys of the decade. Also in 2009, Warren became the first professor in Harvard's history to win the law school's Sacks–Freund Teaching Award for a second time. In 2011, she delivered the commencement address at Rutgers Law School, her alma mater, and received an honorary Doctor of Laws degree and membership in the Order of the Coif. In 2011, Warren was inducted into the Oklahoma Hall of Fame. In January 2012, New Statesman magazine named her one of the "top 20 U.S. progressives". Warren was named one of Time magazine's 100 Most Influential People in the World in 2009, 2010, 2015, and 2017.

In 2018, the Women's History Month theme in the United States was "Nevertheless, She Persisted: Honoring Women Who Fight All Forms of Discrimination Against Women", referring to McConnell's remark about Warren.

== In popular culture ==
- Warren has appeared in the documentary films Maxed Out (2007), Michael Moore's Capitalism: A Love Story (2009), Heist: Who Stole the American Dream? (2011), and Makers: Women Who Make America (2013).
- In 2017, Kate McKinnon played Warren on Saturday Night Live. McKinnon continued her impression of Warren in 2019 and 2020, during the 2020 Democratic Party presidential primaries. On the March 7, 2020, episode, Warren appeared as herself in the cold open alongside McKinnon's impression of her, and together they opened the show.
- In 2019, Warren wrote the entry on Alexandria Ocasio-Cortez for that year's Time 100.
- Warren's popularity is the basis of a wide array of merchandise sold in her name, much of which incorporates Mitch McConnell's remark "Nevertheless, she persisted", including an action figure of Warren.
- Musician Jonathan Mann has written songs about Warren, including "She Persisted".

== Political influence and protégés ==
=== Influence on national politics ===
Warren has been described as a national "liberal standard-bearer" as well as a "standard-bearer" for progressivism. In his 2024 book The Rebels: Elizabeth Warren, Bernie Sanders, Alexandria Ocasio-Cortez, and the Struggle for a New American Politics, Joshua Green cites Warren as a major figure in shaping the Democratic Party's embrace of more leftward politics in the dozen years after the Great Recession. Green considers Warren to have demonstrated "a new way" approach in national politics, whereby politicians engage in "big, loud, messy fights that offered moral clarity and galvanized public sentiment behind a position." He credited this approach for enabling Warren to "take on her own party". Warren herself had previously boasted about being a "thorn" to the Obama administration, taking pride in her willingness to be combative with the administration's major economic officials and occasionally voice public disagreement with Obama's positions.

Fellow journalist Brian Stelter concurred with Green's analysis that Warren (as well as Bernie Sanders and Alexandria Ocasio–Cortez) had "helped lead an economic 'backlash' to the 2008 financial crisis that pulled the [Democratic] party leftward." After the 2016 election of Donald Trump placed the national Democratic Party in a political wilderness as both the opposition to the president and the minority party in both chambers of the Congress, many commenters saw Warren as one of the de facto leading figures in a party that lacked a clear singular post-Obama leader.

Columnists such as Perry Bacon Jr. of The Washington Post have written that ideas Warren promoted during her presidential campaign have had some influence on the Biden administration's agenda. In February 2021, Jeff Bridgood observed that the administration appeared more receptive to Warren's input than the Obama administration had been, reflecting how the party had become more in line with her political philosophy than it had been when she first rose to political prominence. During the Biden administration, Warren has continued to be a prominent voice within her party.

=== Protégés ===
Warren has mentored several people who went on to hold notable political office. Former U.S. Representative Katie Porter, who was a law student of Warren, is considered one of her protégées. Porter co-chaired Warren's presidential campaign. Another of Warren's political protégées is Michelle Wu (mayor of Boston), who was a law student of hers and worked on her 2012 Senate campaign before running for Boston City Council herself in 2013. Suffolk County Sheriff Steven W. Tompkins also got his start in politics working on Warren's 2012 campaign. During his law school studies, former U.S. Representative Joe Kennedy III considered Warren a mentor. Boston City Council president Ruthzee Louijeune has also been described as a Warren protégée and served as senior counsel to Warren's presidential campaign before running for city council.

=== Influence on appointments in Democratic presidential administrations ===
Warren strongly believes that "personnel is policy": that the policy of a presidency is shaped by who a president appoints to their administration. She has influenced President Obama, 2016 Democratic nominee Hillary Clinton, and President Biden on the matter of staffing presidential administrations.

==== Pressuring of Hillary Clinton before the 2016 election ====
Warren discreetly engaged in an effort to shape the administration Hillary Clinton would lead if she won the 2016 election. In his 2024 book, Stern noted that after Warren (bullish on her own 2016 prospects of winning a presidential election) had declined grassroots efforts to draft her into a candidacy. Recognizing that Clinton stood an excellent chance of becoming the party's nominee, Warren quietly worked to influence how she might staff an administration.

In 2019, Alex Thompson reported in Politico on Warren's efforts ahead of the 2016 election to pressure Clinton on potential appointees. Thompson described Warren's theory on political power as "combining tough, often hyperbolic rhetoric to create leverage with quieter, hands-on, person-to-person outreach." He reported that, beginning in December 2014, Warren had discreetly "pressed Clinton to commit to not appointing Wall Street-friendly people to her administration, as Warren felt Bill Clinton and Barack Obama had done." He described this effort as a

Two-year campaign by Warren, her staff and outside allies to push, prod and shape the would-be Clinton administration—an effort that also included an informal blacklist of Clinton allies that Warren and outside partners would resist if nominated for jobs in the Clinton administration.

Thompson reported that Warren had also "sent Clinton a list of people she wanted the campaign team to consult on economic policy in order to broaden their horizons", all of whom had been "critical of the Obama administration's response to the 2008 financial crisis, as Warren had." Thompson reported that Clinton and her political advisors gave great deference to Warren's advice, both out of concern that Warren might otherwise challenge Clinton in the primary, but also due to "Warren’s credibility among progressives and her willingness to use her bully pulpit to condemn members of her own party."

==== Biden administration ====
Warren has had notable success in lobbying President Biden on certain appointments in his administration. A number of Warren's acolytes have served in the Biden administration, including Bharat Ramamurti (a former economic policy advisor to Warren) and Sasha Baker (a former senate and campaign policy advisor to Warren on national security). Within the first three weeks of his presidency, Biden had already named four of Warren's campaign and Senate staffers to positions in his administration, among other Warren allies and protégés. In March 2021, Kara Voght of Mother Jones wrote, "Warren has been a private but constant voice to the Biden administration on personnel decisions." That same month, Zachary Warmbrodt of Politico wrote:

President Joe Biden is enlisting a small army of [Warren's] former aides and allies to run his government. Warren's expanding network in the upper echelons of the administration includes protégés who helped execute her aggressive oversight of big banks and other corporations as well as friends who share her views of the risks looming on Wall Street. But it goes beyond finance, covering pivotal posts at the Department of Education and even the National Security Council. The Warren recruits mark a victory for the progressive movement, which has supported her yearslong "personnel is policy" campaign to chip away at the dominance of corporate insiders in setting policy for Democrats.

== Books and other works ==
In 2004, Warren and her daughter, Amelia Tyagi, wrote The Two-Income Trap: Why Middle-Class Mothers and Fathers Are Going Broke. In the book they state that at that time, a fully employed worker earned less inflation-adjusted income than a fully employed worker had 30 years earlier. Although families spent less at that time on clothing, appliances, and other forms of consumption, the costs of core expenses such as mortgages, health care, transportation, and child care had increased dramatically. According to the authors, the result was that even families with two income earners were no longer able to save and incurred ever greater debt.

In an article in The New York Times, Jeff Madrick said of the book:

The authors find that it is not the free-spending young or the incapacitated elderly who are declaring bankruptcy so much as families with children ... their main thesis is undeniable. Typical families often cannot afford the high-quality education, health care, and neighborhoods required to be middle class today. More clearly than anyone else, I think, Ms. Warren and Ms. Tyagi have shown how little attention the nation and our government have paid to the way Americans really live.

In 2005, Warren and David Himmelstein published a study on bankruptcy and medical bills that found that half of all families filing for bankruptcy did so in the aftermath of a serious medical problem. They say that three-quarters of such families had medical insurance. The study was widely cited in policy debates, but some have challenged its methods and offered alternative interpretations of the data, suggesting that only 17% of bankruptcies are directly attributable to medical expenses.

Metropolitan Books published Warren's book A Fighting Chance in April 2014. According to a Boston Globe review, "the book's title refers to a time she says is now gone, when even families of modest means who worked hard and played by the rules had at a fair shot at the American dream."

In April 2017, Warren published her 11th book, This Fight Is Our Fight: The Battle to Save America's Middle Class, in which she explores the plight of the American middle class and argues that the federal government needs to do more to help working families with stronger social programs and increased investment in education.

Publications

Selected articles

- Warren, Elizabeth (1987). "Bankruptcy Policy". The University of Chicago Law Review. 54 (3): 775–814. doi:10.2307/1599826. JSTOR 1599826.
- Warren, Elizabeth (1992). "The Untenable Case for Repeal of Chapter 11". The Yale Law Journal. 102 (2): 437–479. doi:10.2307/796843. JSTOR 796843.
- Warren, Elizabeth (1993). "Bankruptcy Policymaking in an Imperfect World". Michigan Law Review. 92 (2): 336–387. doi:10.2307/1289668. JSTOR 1289668.
- Warren, Elizabeth (1997). "Principled Approach to Consumer Bankruptcy". American Bankruptcy Law Journal. 71: 483.
- Warren, Elizabeth (Fall 1998). "The Bankruptcy Crisis" (PDF). Indiana Law Journal. 73 (4): 1079.
- Warren, Elizabeth; Westbrook, Jay Lawrence (January 2000). "Financial Characteristics of Businesses in Bankruptcy". American Bankruptcy Law Journal. 73: 499. doi:10.2139/ssrn.194750. S2CID 152694691. SSRN 194750.
- Himmelstein, David U.; Warren, Elizabeth; Thorne, Deborah; Woolhandler, Steffie J. (2005). "Illness and injury as contributors to bankruptcy". Health Affairs. Suppl Web Exclusives: W5–63–W5–73. doi:10.1377/hlthaff.w5.63. PMID 15689369. S2CID 73034397. SSRN 664565.
- Warren, Elizabeth (2007). "The Vanishing Middle Class". In Edwards, John; Crane, Marion; Kalleberg, Arne L. (eds.). Ending Poverty in America: How to Restore the American Dream. The New Press. p. 38–54. ISBN 978-1-59558-176-1.
- Himmelstein, David U.; Thorne, Deborah; Warren, Elizabeth; Woolhandler, Steffie (2009). "Medical bankruptcy in the United States, 2007: Results of a national study". The American Journal of Medicine. 122 (8): 741–746. doi:10.1016/j.amjmed.2009.04.012. PMID 19501347. S2CID 25720725.

Books

- As We Forgive Our Debtors: Bankruptcy and Consumer Credit in America. Oxford University Press. 1989. ISBN 978-0-19-505578-8. (with Teresa A. Sullivan and Jay Westbrook)
- The Fragile Middle Class: Americans in Debt. Yale University Press. 2001. ISBN 978-0-300-09171-7. (with Teresa A. Sullivan and Jay Westbrook)
- The Two-Income Trap: Why Middle-Class Parents are Going Broke. Basic Books. 2004. ISBN 978-0-465-09090-7. (with Amelia Warren Tyagi)
- All Your Worth: The Ultimate Lifetime Money Plan. Simon & Schuster. 2006. ISBN 978-0-7432-6988-9. (with Amelia Warren Tyagi)
- Casenote Legal Briefs: Commercial Law. Aspen Publishers. 2006. ISBN 978-0-7355-5827-4. (with Lynn M. LoPucki, Daniel Keating, Ronald Mann, and Normal Goldenberg)
- The Law of Debtors and Creditors: Text, Cases, and Problems (6th ed.). Aspen Publishers. 2008. ISBN 978-0-7355-7626-1. (with Jay Westbrook)
- Chapter 11: Reorganizing American Businesses (Essentials). Aspen Publishers. 2008. ISBN 978-0-7355-7654-4.
- Secured Credit: A Systems Approach. Wolters Kluwer. 2008. ISBN 978-0-7355-7649-0. (with Lynn M. LoPucki)
- A Fighting Chance. Metropolitan Books. 2014. ISBN 978-1627790529.
- This Fight Is Our Fight: The Battle to Save America's Middle Class. Metropolitan Books. 2017. ISBN 978-1250120618.
- Pinkie Promises. Macmillan. 2021. ISBN 9781250801029.
- Persist. Metropolitan Books. 2021. ISBN 9781250799241.

== See also ==
- List of female United States presidential and vice presidential candidates
- List of people who received an electoral vote in the United States Electoral College
- Progressivism in the United States
- Women in the United States Senate

Government offices
New office	Chair of the Congressional Oversight Panel; 2008–2010	Succeeded by Ted Kaufman
New office	Special Advisor for the Consumer Financial Protection Bureau; 2010–2011	Succeeded by Raj Date
Party political offices
Preceded by Martha Coakley	Democratic nominee for U.S. Senator from Massachusetts (Class 1); 2012, 2018, 2024	Most recent
Preceded by Julian Castro	Keynote Speaker of the Democratic National Convention; 2016	Succeeded by Stacey Abrams, Raumesh Akbari, Colin Allred, Brendan Boyle, Yvanna Cancela, Kathleen Clyde, Nikki Fried, Robert Garcia, Malcolm Kenyatta, Marlon Kimpson, Conor Lamb, Mari Manoogian, Victoria Neave, Jonathan Nez, Sam Park, Denny Ruprecht, Randall Woodfin
Preceded by Chuck Schumer	Vice Chair of the Senate Democratic Conference; 2017–present Served alongside: Mark Warner	Incumbent
Preceded by Scott Brown	U.S. Senator (Class 1) from Massachusetts; 2013–present Served alongside: John Kerry, Mo Cowan, Ed Markey	Incumbent
Preceded by Tim Scott	Ranking Member of the Senate Banking Committee; 2025–present	Incumbent
U.S. order of precedence (ceremonial)
Preceded by Chris Murphy	Order of precedence of the United States as United States Senator	Succeeded by Tim Scott
Preceded by Ted Cruz	United States senators by seniority 42nd	Succeeded by Deb Fischer
