= Fighting Chance =

Fighting Chance may refer to:

- Fighting Chance (organization), a cancer patient advocate organization
- The Fighting Chance (1916 film)
- The Fighting Chance (1920 film), a 1920 American silent film directed by Charles Maigne
- The Fighting Chance (1955 film), a 1955 American drama film directed by William Witney
- Fighting Chance (EP), a 2003 EP by Flee the Seen
- Fighting Chance, a 2001-2005 Baltimore band associated with Insurgence Records
- A Fighting Chance (memoir), a 2014 memoir by Senator Elizabeth Warren
- A Fighting Chance (book), a 1966 book about rowing the Atlantic Ocean by John Ridgway and Chay Blyth
- The Fighting Chance (organisation), a London-based not-for-profit that engages disadvantaged people into work through sport
