= This Fight Is Our Fight =

2017 book by Elizabeth Warren

This Fight Is Our Fight: The Battle to Save America's Middle Class
- Author: Elizabeth Warren
- Language: English
- Genre: Non-fiction
- Publisher: Metropolitan Books
- Publication date: 2017
- Publication place: United States
- ISBN: 978-1427291875

This Fight Is Our Fight: The Battle to Save America's Middle Class is a 2017 book by American Democratic politician Elizabeth Warren. An audiobook read by Warren herself was published through Macmillan Audio (ISBN 978-1427291875).
