= Lelia J. Robinson =

American lawyer

Lelia Josephine Robinson
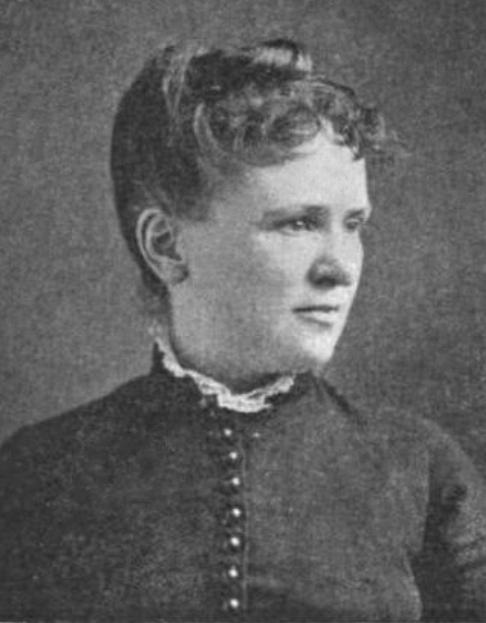
- Born: July 23, 1850; Boston, Massachusetts
- Died: August 10, 1891 (aged 41)
- Education: Boston University School of Law
- Occupation: Lawyer

Lelia Josephine Robinson (July 23, 1850 – August 10, 1891) was the first woman to be admitted to the bar and practice in the courts of Massachusetts in 1882.

== Early life ==
Robinson was born on July 23, 1850, to a middle-class family in Boston, Massachusetts. Her parents were Mary and Daniel Robinson.

Robinson married Rupert J. Chute at age seventeen, after completing her public education.

She worked as a journalist in Boston, writing for the Boston Globe, Boston Post, and Boston Times. She also worked in Berlin as a foreign correspondent.

Robinson divorced her husband in 1877 for adultery, the only acceptable grounds for divorce at that time. She decided to pursue a legal career in effort to support herself at the age of twenty-eight.

== Education and requirements for the Bar ==
Robinson enrolled as a student at Boston University School of Law in October 1879, the only woman in a class of 150. Other women had previously enrolled there as law students, but all failed to complete their legal education. Robinson did not feel like she did not belong at this school. She acted as if she belonged, and was even called "good fellow" by her male classmates. She was the first woman to graduate from Boston University School of Law, in June 1881. She graduated, cum laude, fourth in her class out of 32 students.

To satisfy the court, she needed to meet several requirements. These included an intention to live in the commonwealth, be twenty-one years old, have good moral character, provide a reference letter from a practicing attorney, and pass an examination by the court.

== Admittance to the bar ==
After graduating from law school, Robinson was denied admission to the Massachusetts Bar in Suffolk County in June 1881 by Chief Justice Horace Gray. She took up the matter with the Supreme Court of Massachusetts, which allowed her to draft a brief in support of her argument in favor of women practicing law. The Massachusetts Supreme Court then determined that women could not be lawyers, despite no language in the Massachusetts constitution to the contrary. The court reasoned that, while attorneys were public officers, they were close enough to make the court pause. The only offices women were traditionally allowed to hold at common law were overseer of the poor and queen, so the court decided to defer to the Massachusetts legislature on the issue of allowing women to practice law. While waiting for her admittance to the bar, Robinson had her own legal business, with male lawyers to conduct her cases in the court. She was not even permitted to present her oral argument for bar admittance on her own behalf.

There was a general fear in the late nineteenth century that allowing a woman to practice law would lead to their right to suffrage (a right that was not granted until 1920), and a disturbance of the current social order. The court eventually unanimously denied Robinson's petition, claiming that existing law set no precedent for allowing women to practice in the courts, and that the legislature's failure to expressly provide that women could become members of the bar was further support of that opinion.

Robinson took her fight to the legislature. She drafted a bill that would authorize women to take the bar exam and practice law in the court, and garnered support. She argued that the word "citizen" in the Massachusetts Bar statute was a gender-neutral term, and that Massachusetts should follow the direction of the fourteen other states that had admitted women to the bar. She argued that "as a citizen, under the Fourteenth Amendment to the Constitution, her privileges and immunities could not be abridged, and thus she was entitled to take the bar examination just like her male colleagues". The Massachusetts legislature responded to the Supreme Court of Massachusetts ruling, and passed the bill just one year later, announcing: "The best administration of justice may be most safely secured by allowing the representation of all classes of the people in courts of justice." The legislature also allowed women to be appointed as "special commissioners," which was a way to allow women to perform notary duties without running afoul of Massachusetts's constitutional ban at the time.

Following the passage of the bill, Robinson passed the bar exam in 1882, and became the first woman to be admitted to the bar and practice in the courts of Massachusetts. She also helped to draft and pass a Massachusetts bill allowing women to take depositions and administer oaths.

== Legal career ==
Robinson went on to have her own private legal practice. She moved to Seattle, Washington, in 1884 where society was much more receptive to women in the law. Here, she observed a circuit court and met Roger Sherman Greene and John C. Haines, who became her mentors. Haines and Henry G. Struve offered Robinson a desk at their office. Robinson also served on the bar examination committee. Greene, the judge for the Washington Territory, appointed her as a criminal defense attorney. Robinson was the first woman in Washington to argue a case to a jury, and to argue in front of a jury consisting of both men and women. She supported women's suffrage and duty to vote.

Robinson wrote a few major publications, including Law Made Easy, and a book on divorce law titled The Law of Husband and Wife,'

She took various surveys about women in the law, compiling information on their professional and personal lives, and constantly pushing for gender equality in the profession. She located 120 female lawyers and published an article about them in the Green Bag.

In April 1890, Robinson married Eli Sawtelle, a piano dealer. On their honeymoon, they went to Washington, D.C.. She was sworn in as the sixth woman to take the oath as a member of the U.S. Supreme Court bar on April 8.

Robinson died at the age of 41, in 1891, of an accidental belladonna overdose, leaving behind a remarkable impact on legal history. In a paper published shortly before her death, she imparted these final words to future generations: "[I]n time, sooner or later, the lawyer everywhere who deserves success and can both work and wait to win it, is sure to achieve it, -the woman no less than the man."

== Friendship with Mary Greene ==
In Boston, Massachusetts, 1888, there were only two women practicing law, Lelia J. Robinson and Mary Greene. They both had a passion for the law, and acquired diplomas from Boston University School of Law. They became friends. They wrote and lobbied for an amendment to the Massachusetts Act of 1883. Greene and Robinson worked together to network with other professional women, and were part of the Equity Club. Together in 1888, they founded the Portia Club, a club where women lawyers and law students from Massachusetts came together once a month at a Boston hotel private dining room for an informal dinner.

== The Lelia J. Robinson Award ==
Each year, the Women's Bar Association of Massachusetts presents the Lelia J. Robinson Award at their annual gala to a woman who has captured the spirit of pioneering in the legal profession and has made a difference in her community. The attorneys who are given this award have excelled in practice, government, or academia. They have served as mentors and role models, and have promoted equality and justice. The award honors Robinson's mission to extend representation to all classes of people and to build a society that is truly just.

Past award recipients include Judge Nonnie Burnes, Christine Hughes, and Caryn R. Mitchell-Munevar. The 2024 winners were Chief Justice Kimberly Budd, Governor Maura Healey, and the Honorable Maureen Mulligan.
