= National Bankruptcy Conference =

Bankruptcy law reform

The National Bankruptcy Conference (NBC) is a nonpartisan, nonprofit organization of approximately 60 judges, lawyers, and academics. The NBC's primary mission is to advise the U.S. Congress on improvements to the bankruptcy laws. The NBC also comments on proposed changes to the Federal Rules of Bankruptcy Procedure and writes position papers on matters of bankruptcy policy. NBC membership is by invitation only.

Scholars have described the NBC as "the single most important voice in bankruptcy reform" and as having a "policy monopoly" on the field of bankruptcy law. A former chair of the NBC once characterized the organization as a "ministry of justice" for bankruptcy law. NBC members are prominent experts in the field and have included Circuit Judge Thomas Ambro, Professor Vern Countryman, Circuit Judge Conrad Cyr, attorney Harvey Miller, Representative Katie Porter, and Senator Elizabeth Warren.

== History ==
The NBC's roots trace to 1932 when a small number of bankruptcy judges and lawyers gathered at a private home near Boston to discuss needed changes to the bankruptcy laws in response to the Great Depression. The group met again a few months later at a national convention in St. Louis. As it gradually added new members in the following years, the group continued to meet at national professional gatherings. From the beginning the goal was to have a representative but small group of policy-minded experts to provide advice to Congress on the bankruptcy laws. The group soon decided to focus on the longer-term goal of comprehensive reform rather than a series of smaller statutory fixes. These efforts led to the 1938 enactment of the Chandler Act, which is the forerunner of today's chapter 11 business reorganization procedure. On the heels of that success and now calling itself the NBC, the group stayed together to provide similar technical assistance as future bankruptcy policy issues arose.

In the decades after World War II, the NBC continued to influence the development of bankruptcy legislation. For example, Congress adopted its recommendations in 1952 bankruptcy legislation and in 1969 took up consideration of an NBC-sponsored proposal concerning consumer bankruptcy. In the 1970s, the NBC and its members participated in the Commission on the Bankruptcy Laws of the United States and the subsequent debates that led to the Bankruptcy Reform Act of 1978, which enacted the current U.S. Bankruptcy Code. A history of U.S. bankruptcy law characterizes the NBC as "instrumental" in passage of the 1978 law.

In 1994, the NBC published Reforming the Bankruptcy Code: The National Bankruptcy Conference's Code Review Project which recommended reforms throughout the Bankruptcy Code. The book and NBC conferees influenced the National Bankruptcy Review Commission whose recommendations contributed to the extensive 2005 changes to the U.S. bankruptcy law.

In 2010, the NBC published a report recommending changes to the laws governing small-business bankruptcy. Throughout the decade, the NBC used this report to advocate for law reform to make bankruptcy a more effective tool for small businesses. When introducing legislation on the topic, Senator Charles Grassley credited the NBC as one of the organizations that had worked with his office to bring the bill to Congress. These efforts culminated in the 2019 enactment of a new subchapter within U.S. bankruptcy law for small business debtors.

== Current Work ==
NBC conferees have expertise across all aspects of bankruptcy law. About half of its members are practicing bankruptcy lawyers with expertise in large corporate chapter 11 cases, consumer bankruptcies, small-business bankruptcies, and farm bankruptcies. The other half are federal court judges or academics specializing in bankruptcy law. The NBC as a whole meets twice annually and issues recommendations as issues arise. In 2026, the NBC issued recommendations to raise the debt caps in consumer and small-business bankruptcies and wrote a letter urging Congress to overturn the result in Bartenwerfer v. Buckley to protect innocent spouses from fraudulently incurred debts of their partners.

== External Sources ==
- Official website
- History of the National Bankruptcy Conference
