= Bruce H. Mann =

American legal scholar (born 1950)

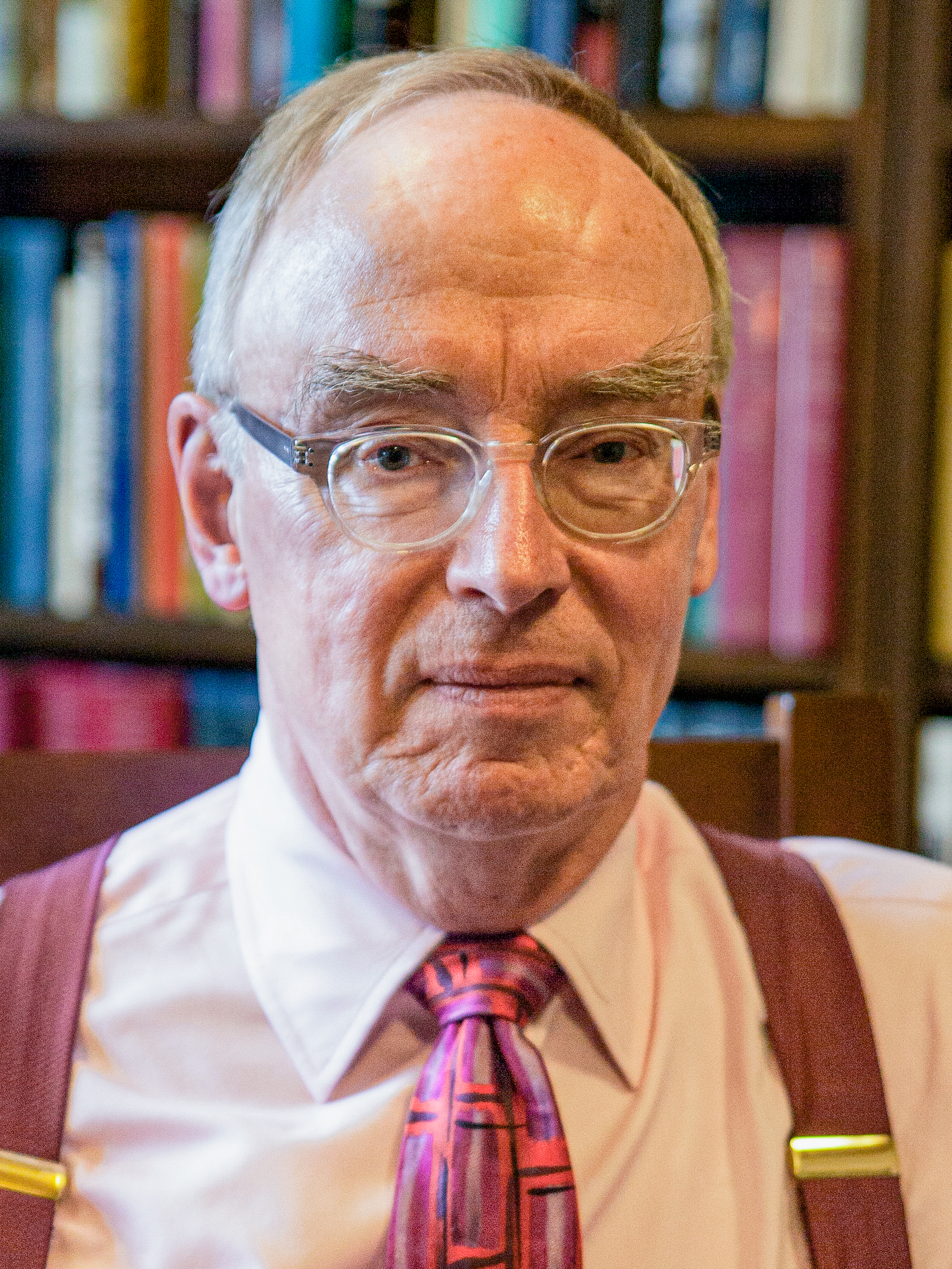
- Born: Bruce Hartling Mann; April 27, 1950 (age 76); Cambridge, Massachusetts, U.S.
- Spouse: Elizabeth Warren (m. 1980)

Academic background
- Education: Brown University (BA, MA); Yale University (MPhil, JD, PhD)
- Thesis: Rationality, Legal Change, and Community in Connecticut, 1690–1760.

Academic work
- Discipline: Law
- Institutions: Harvard University; Washington University in St. Louis

Bruce Hartling Mann (born April 27, 1950) is an American legal scholar who is the Carl F. Schipper Jr. Professor of Law at Harvard Law School, and husband of U.S. Senator Elizabeth Warren. A legal historian, his research focuses on the relationship among legal, social, and economic change in early United States. He began teaching at Harvard Law School in 2006, after being the Leon Meltzer Professor of Law and Professor of History at the University of Pennsylvania Law School.

== Early life and education ==
Bruce Hartling Mann was born on April 27, 1950, in Massachusetts. He graduated in 1968 from Hingham High School in Hingham, Massachusetts. He received B.A. and M.A. degrees from Brown University (1972) and M.Phil., J.D., and Ph.D. degrees from Yale University (1975, 1975, and 1977, respectively). His dissertation was titled "Rationality, Legal Change, and Community in Connecticut, 1690–1760." Mann has been licensed to practice law in Connecticut since 1975.

== Career ==
After graduation, Mann taught at the University of Connecticut School of Law, Washington University School of Law, University of Houston Law Center, University of Texas School of Law, University of Michigan Law School, and the history department at Princeton University. In 1987, Mann started to teach at the University of Pennsylvania Law School.

He is the author of Neighbors and Strangers: Law and Community in Early Connecticut (2001) and Republic of Debtors: Bankruptcy in the Age of American Independence (2009). From 2011 to 2013, Mann served as president of the American Society for Legal History.

== Personal life ==
Mann is married to Elizabeth Warren, the senior United States senator from Massachusetts and a former law professor. Warren proposed to Mann after she observed him teach a property class, having previously met at a law conference. Warren was a Democratic candidate for president of the United States in the 2020 election.

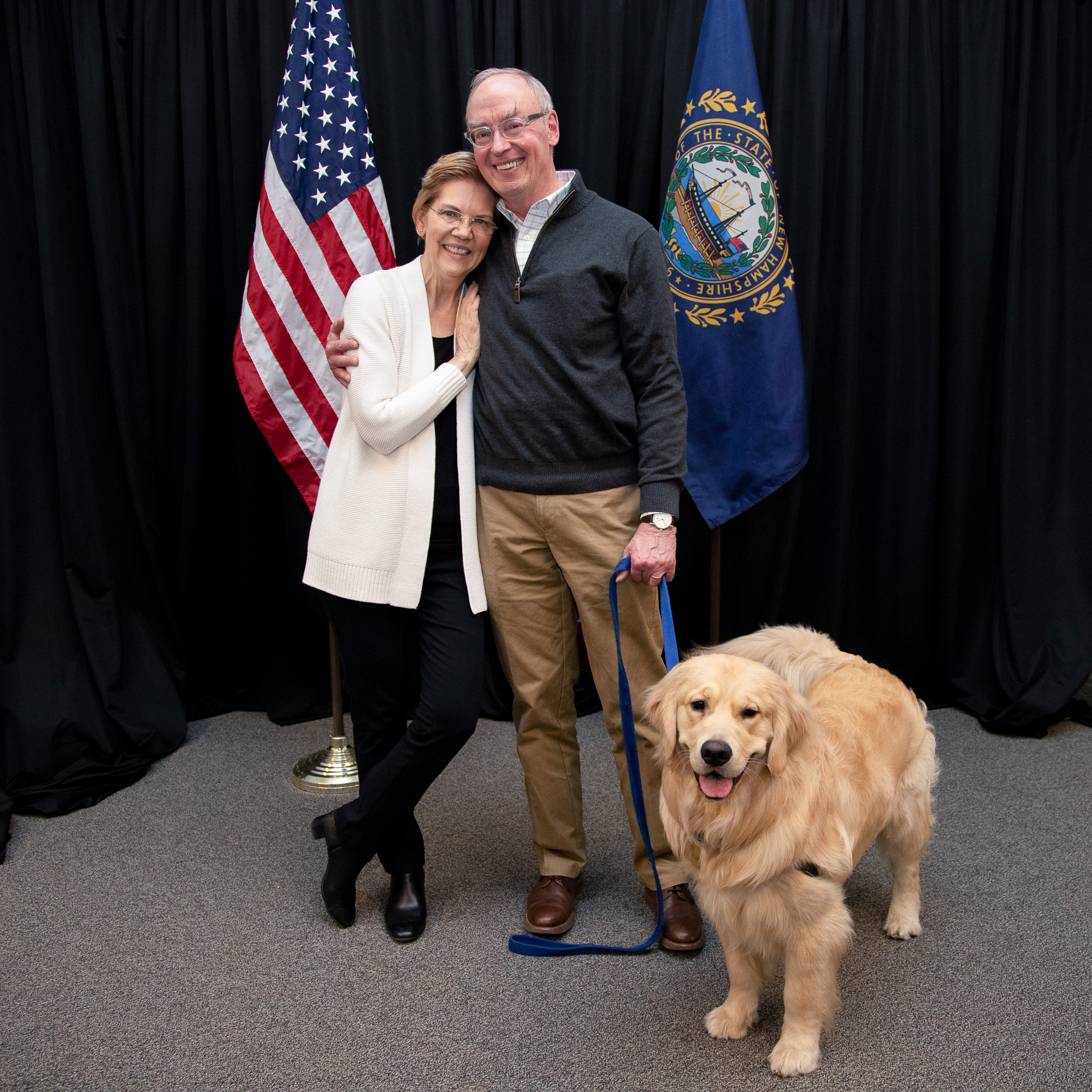
Warren and Mann in 2019 with their golden retriever, Bailey

Mann was involved in the Elizabeth Warren Native American ancestry scandal in that he also erroneously claimed Cherokee ancestry in the same 1984 cookbook that Warren did.

== Awards ==
- SHEAR Book Prize from the Society for Historians of the Early American Republic.
- Littleton-Griswold Prize from the American Historical Association.
- J. Willard Hurst Prize from the Law and Society Association.

Academic offices
Preceded by David Westfall	Carl F. Schipper Jr. Professor of Law at Harvard Law School; 2006–present	Incumbent
