= Bailey (dog) =

Pet Golden Retriever of Elizabeth Warren

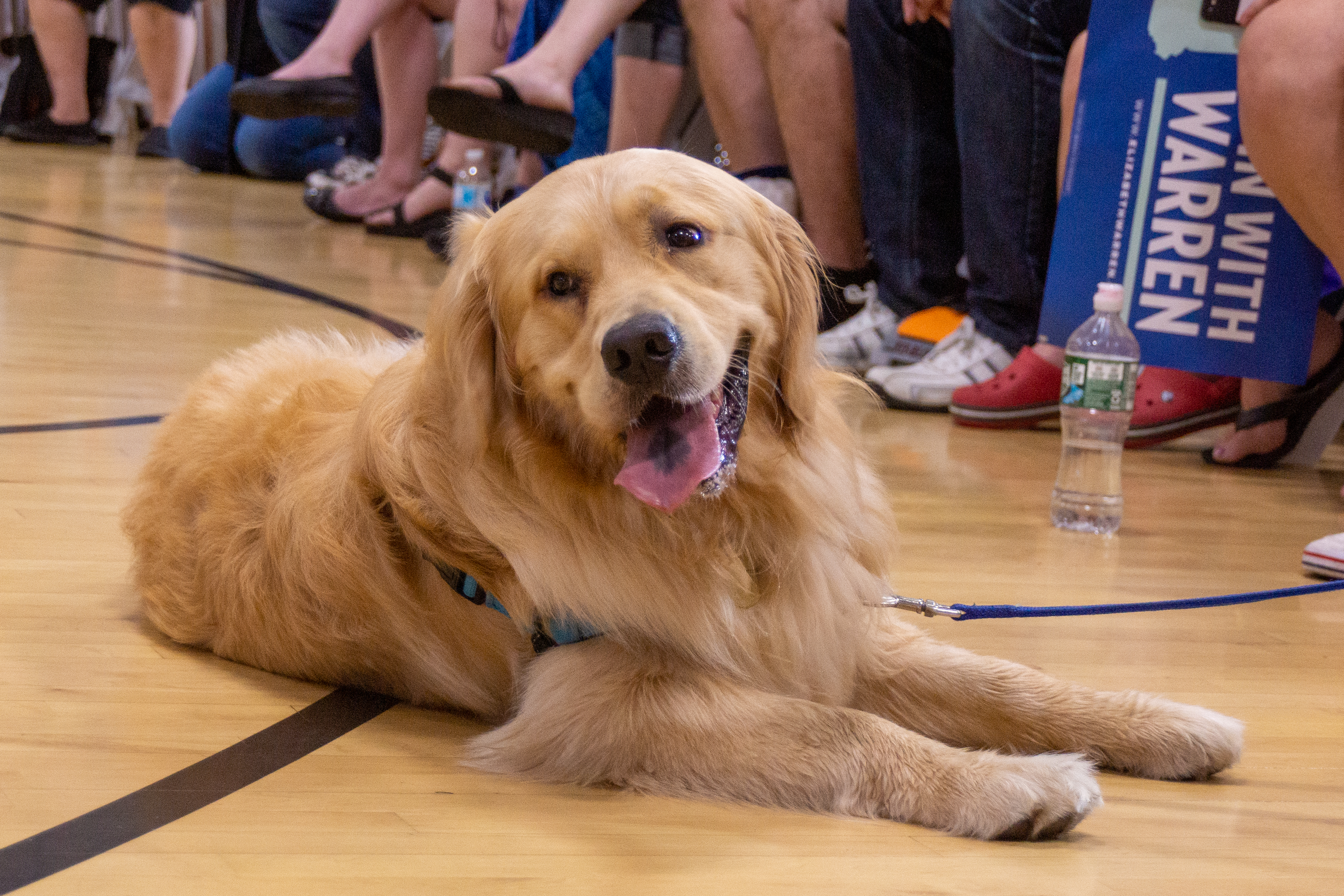
- Bailey at a Warren 2020 town hall in Derry, New Hampshire, on July 27, 2019
- Species: Canis familiaris
- Breed: Golden Retriever
- Sex: Male
- Born: May 1, 2018; United States
- Known for: Elizabeth Warren 2020 presidential campaign
- Owners: Bruce H. Mann; Elizabeth Warren
- Residence: Massachusetts

Bailey (born May 1, 2018) is a pet dog belonging to United States Senator Elizabeth Warren of Massachusetts. A male Golden Retriever, Bailey played a role in Warren's 2020 presidential campaign and was a fixture on the campaign trail, appearing in selfies alongside his owners.

== Activities ==
Bailey was a 2018 gift from Warren's husband, Bruce Mann. He is named after George Bailey from It's A Wonderful Life. The couple told CNN in an October 2019 interview that they had long been dog people, and that Bailey helped them keep calm and maintain "the illusion of normalcy". They had previously owned another golden retriever, Otis, who died in 2012.

During Warren's 2020 campaign, Bailey was featured on official and unofficial campaign merchandise including stickers, t-shirts, tote bags, and leashes. He made several notable appearances on the campaign trail, including crashing a CNN interview in October 2019, appearing in a Fort Dodge, Iowa rally in January 2020, and serving as a surrogate while Warren was attending the Trump impeachment trial.

During the Iowa caucuses, The Des Moines Register credited Bailey as a "natural closer" in its endorsement of Warren. Shortly after Warren announced the end of her presidential campaign on March 5, 2020, Bailey was filmed stealing a burrito presumed to belong to a campaign staffer or press aide; the video subsequently went viral.

An unofficial Twitter fan account operated by Robert Abare, @FirstDogBailey, had over 30,000 followers in 2020.

== See also ==
- List of individual dogs
- United States presidential pets
