= Lynn M. LoPucki =

American legal scholar

Lynn M. LoPucki holds professorial positions at both UCLA School of Law and Harvard Law School. LoPucki is the Security Pacific Bank Professor of Law at UCLA Law and the Bruce W. Nichols Visiting Professor of Law at Harvard Law. LoPucki is a nationally recognized expert on bankruptcy and compiled a widely used research database on bankruptcy in the U.S. called Bankruptcy Research Database which forms the basis for a large portion of empirical academic research on bankruptcy.

LoPucki is notable for his criticism of the bankruptcy industry in the U.S. including the magnitude of fees paid to professionals as well as corruption within the court system. In his book Courting Failure: How Competition for Big Cases Is Corrupting the Bankruptcy Courts (University of Michigan Press, 2005), LoPucki asserted that Federal Bankruptcy judges have become corrupted by their competition to attract large company bankruptcy filings to their districts, and are offering favorable rulings for such companies in order to attract them.

He graduated from University of Michigan and Harvard Law School.

== Recent publications ==
- Routine Illegality in Big-Case Bankruptcy Court Fee Practices, Lynn M. LoPucki and Joseph W. Doherty, American Bankruptcy L. J. (forthcoming 2009)
- Professional Overcharging in Large Bankruptcy Reorganization Cases, Lynn M. LoPucki and Joseph W. Doherty, 5 Journal of Empirical Legal Studies 983 (December 2008)
- Rise of the Financial Advisors: An Empirical Study of the Division of Professional Fees in Large Bankruptcies, Lynn M. LoPucki and Joseph W. Doherty, 82 American Bankruptcy L. J. (2008)
- Bankruptcy Fire Sales, Lynn M. LoPucki and Joseph W. Doherty, 106 Michigan L. Rev. 1 (2007)
- Delaware Bankruptcy: Failure in the Ascendancy, Lynn M. LoPucki and Joseph W. Doherty, 73 Chicago L. Rev. 1387 (2006)
- An Empirical Study of the Determinants of Professional Fees in Large Bankruptcy Reorganization Cases., Lynn M. LoPucki and Joseph W. Doherty, 1 Journal of Empirical Legal Studies 111 (March 2004)
- Why Are Delaware and New York Bankruptcy Reorganizations Failing?, Lynn M. LoPucki and Joseph W. Doherty, 55 Vanderbilt L. Rev. 1933 (November 2002)
- The Failure of Public Company Bankruptcies in Delaware and New York: Empirical Evidence of a "Race to the Bottom", Lynn M. LoPucki and Sara D. Kalin, 54 Vanderbilt L. Rev. 231 (March 2001)
