= A Fighting Chance (memoir) =

2014 memoir by Elizabeth Warren

- First edition
- Author: Elizabeth Warren
- Language: English
- Subject: Political convictions
- Genre: politics
- Publisher: Metropolitan Books
- Publication date: April 22, 2014
- Publication place: United States
- Media type: Print (Hardcover)
- Pages: 384
- ISBN: 1627790527

A Fighting Chance is a 2014 memoir by the American academic and senior Massachusetts United States Senator Elizabeth Warren. The book details Warren's life from her upbringing in Oklahoma City to her unexpectedly successful bid for the United States Senate in 2012.

== Content ==
The main theme of Warren's book centers on the values of hard work and the benefits to be reaped from never giving up. In it, she describes how her experiences as a child affected her worldview of things, especially in regards to the financial status of middle class America. Warren also discusses how, over the decades, big banks and transnational corporations have managed to control almost every corridor of Washington "with armies of lobbyists and lawyers" at their beck and call.

== Sales ==
Warren's book has garnered praise from a number of sources and sold better than some of her Republican counterparts. The release of the book prompted pundits to say that she is leaving open the possibility to run for president in 2016 or even 2020, in spite of the fact that she repeatedly declared that she is not running. More than 65,000 copies were sold by the third quarter of 2014, eventually leading to a paperback release one year later.

== Critical reception ==
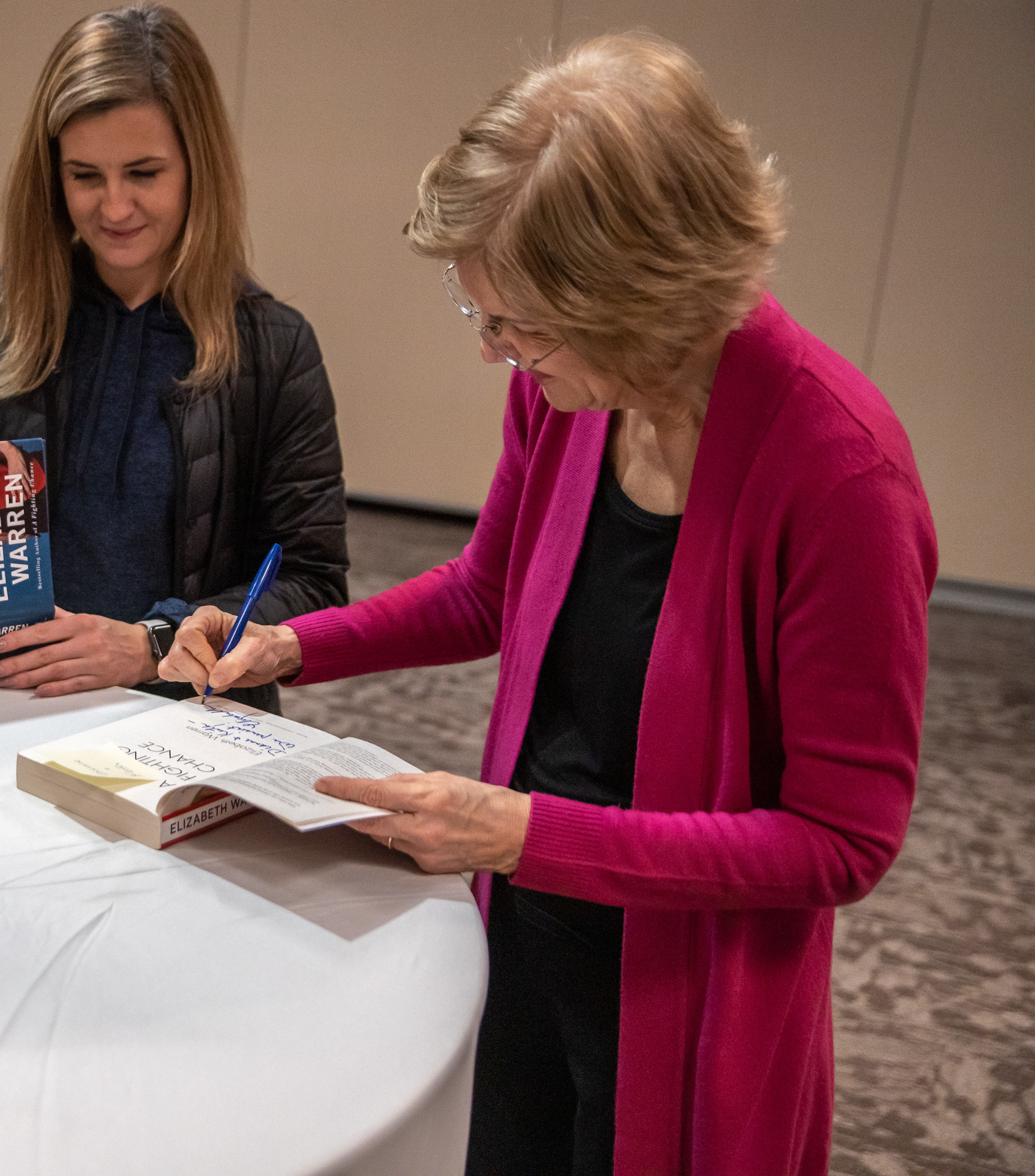
At a January 2020 campaign rally for her 2020 presidential campaign, Warren signs a supporter's copy of A Fighting Chance

A Fighting Chance was praised by Amy Chozick of The New York Times, who wrote, "The book is a potent mix of memoir and policy that makes politics seem like a necessary evil, and yet it's impossible to read Warren's story without thinking about her meteoric rise in the Democratic Party and those Warren groupies on Connecticut Avenue. That makes the aw-shucks, I-just-stumbled-into-the-Senate anecdotes that propel her narrative feel inevitably like the savvy (critics would say self-serving) story lines that would play so well at an Elks Club in Iowa." Maura J. Casey of The Washington Post observed that "the book's message is that one person can make a difference, but change is painfully slow, uneven and the work of a lifetime. After reading this book, it is comforting to know that Elizabeth Warren, with her passion, anger and bluntness, will not be silenced." A Fighting Chance was also praised by John Cassidy of The New York Review of Books, who remarked, "If Warren has a big idea, this is it: the conception of society as an organic, mutually dependent whole." Writing for The New Yorker, the historian Jill Lepore compared the book favorably to Louis Brandeis's 1914 book Other People's Money and How the Bankers Use It, writing:

Warren is also smart enough to use the conventions of political biography, old and new, to insist on the existence of a relationship between caring for other people and caring about politics. Her brief is really about the abandonment of children, not by women who go to school or to work but by legislatures and courts that have allowed the nation's social and economic policies to be made by corporations and bankers. Writing about her children and grandchildren—rocking that baby—is more than the place where Warren leaves Brandeis behind. It's an argument about where our real debts lie.

A Fighting Chance was similarly praised by Michael Jonas of The Boston Globe and David Lauter of the Los Angeles Times.

Conversely, Mary Kissel of The Wall Street Journal was heavily critical of the book, describing it as "the story of how a middle-class girl rose to the Senate—and came to see the market economy that gave her the chance as 'rigged.'" The book was similarly attacked by Christopher Bedford for the conservative magazine National Review, who perceived it as a campaign book for Warren's anticipated entry into the 2016 presidential election. Ultimately however, Warren ended up endorsing Hillary Clinton during the last week of the Democratic primary.
