= Fighting Chance (organization) =

US non-profit organization

- Founded: 2002
- Location: Sag Harbor, New York, United States
- Region served: East End of Long Island, New York
- Product: Free-of-Charge counseling and resource center for cancer patients
- Website: www.fightingchance.org

Fighting Chance is a United States patient advocate organization that provides counseling for cancer patients and caregivers. Independent from any hospital and funded solely by charitable contributions, Fighting Chance, a 501(c)(3) non-profit, provides free access to hard-to-find resources and professional counseling from the time of diagnosis through treatment to survivorship. Headquartered in Sag Harbor, New York, the organization operates on the East End of Long Island and also offers e-counseling outside the area.

== Organization ==
A 16-member board of directors, composed primarily of cancer survivors and caregivers, meet quarterly to guide the overall direction of the organization and plan annual events. The board is led by chairman Duncan Darrow who is also the founder of Fighting Chance. The board is responsible for organizing the Fighting Chance Annual Summer Gala each year.

Day-to-day operations are handled by Karrie Zampini Robinson, LCSW an oncology social worker with over 20 years of experience; Laraine Gordon, LCSW, an oncology social worker with over 10 years of experience; and William Di Scipio, Ph.D., a clinical psychologist and retired member of the faculty at the Einstein School of Medicine.

A Medical Advisory Committee of oncologists, some of whom also serve as board members, contributes to day-to-day operations. They include: Martin Karpeh Jr., MD, Head of Surgery, Beth Israel Medical Center, New York City; Peter Bach, MD, Pulmonologist and Biostatistician at Memorial Sloan-Kettering Cancer Center in New York City; and Philip Schulman, MD, head of the Long Island satellite branch (based in Commack, New York) of Memorial Sloan-Kettering Cancer Center.

== History ==
In April 2001, Charlotte Darrow was diagnosed with metastatic lung cancer and survived only 100 days after diagnosis. The lack of support groups and professional counseling in this small town, located about 100 miles east of New York City, led Charlotte's son to start an organization that would provide tools to help future cancer patients in the area to navigate the healthcare system. The charity was created in Charlotte's honor, as Duncan Darrow used to pray, not for a miracle, but that his mother simply be given a "fighting chance." The term Fighting Chance was registered as a service marked by the United States Patent and Trademark Office in 2004.

== Leadership ==
- Duncan Darrow – Founder and chairman, 2002 – Present
- Willam J. DiScipio, Ph.D. – Executive Director, 2008– Present
- Karrie Zampini Robinson, LCSW – Director of Clinical Programs, 2005–Present
- Nancy Greenberg – Oncology Patient Navigator and Office Admin
- Martin Karpeh Jr., MD – Medical Advisory Committee, 2005 – Present
- Peter Bach, MD — Medical Advisory Committee, 2005 – Present
- Philip Schulman, MD – Medical Advisory Committee, 2005 – Present

== Resource guide ==
Since 2004, Fighting Chance has updated and published an annual resource guide with a regional focus titled Coping with Cancer on the East End – a Practical Resource Guide. Topics covered in the free downloadable 93-page booklet include contact information for area doctors, hospitals, pharmacies and assisted living facilities; sources of complementary or alternative medicine; guidance on obtaining a second opinion, the scope of coverage under health insurance policies and protocols for clinical trials; and a list of useful websites.

== Sister organizations ==
In 2008, Duncan Darrow established a sister non-profit organization called cancersimplified.org. The organization's website, launched in 2009, explains cancer in layman's terms through a 44-page flip chart presentation.

== Other references ==
- Stand Up to Cancer – Resources and Support
- Cure Today – Resources
- Women's Cancer Network – Advocacy Group
- The Wellness Community – Resources
