= Women's Bar Association of Massachusetts =

- Founded: 1978
- Type: Bar Association
- Location: Boston, Massachusetts
- Region served: Law
- Website: wbawbf.org

The Women's Bar Association of Massachusetts (WBA) has over 1500 members and was founded in Boston, Massachusetts in 1978 with a goal to achieve the full and equal participation of women in the legal profession and in society. It is one of the oldest and largest women's bar associations in the country.

== History ==
In 1979, a group of activist women lawyer's met for dinner at Dini's on Tremont Street in Boston. The discussion that night revolved around the concern that no bar association in the Commonwealth of Massachusetts was speaking out on issues affecting women and women lawyers. Equally troubling to these early pioneers was the significant lack of women on the bench, and the failure of any bar association to actively encourage women to serve in the judiciary.

These women were convinced that a bar association that spoke out on behalf of women's issues would garner membership and gain credibility in the legal community. Thus, in the spring of 1977, the Women's Bar Association of Massachusetts was born.

Today, 30 years later, the WBA & WBF occupy a small office suite on School Street, not far from where Dini's used to be. The Women's Bar Foundation (WBF) was founded in 1993 to oversee its charitable activities. Together, the staff of the WBA and WBF consist of a full-time executive director, membership director, strategic partnerships director, business manager, and administrative assistant, as well as a deputy director for both organizations and a staff attorney for the Family Law Project.

=== Highlights in WBA history ===
- 1978: WBA holds its first organization meeting
- 1979: Elaine Epstein becomes the first WBA president.
- 1980: WBA drafts and files its first bill-tax incentives for employer-sponsored child care.
- 1983: WBA files its first amicus brief to the U.S. Supreme Court in Hishon v. King & Spaulding (Title VII prohibits law firms from discriminating in partnership decisions).
- 1990: WBA hosts its first annual Gala.
- 1991: WBA sponsors "Battered Women Fighting Back."
- 1993: WBA creates the Women's Bar Foundation to oversee its pro bono projects.
- 2001: WBA publishes its ground-breaking report "More than Part-Time," receiving national and international attention.
- 2002: WBA successfully lobbies for the passage of the Contraceptives Coverage Bill (requiring private health insurers in Massachusetts to cover contraceptives).

== Legislative agenda and achievements ==
The WBA has a Legislative Committee that seeks to advance various legislative priorities surrounding women and the law.

=== Legislative priorities ===
- Welfare: The WBA supports An Act to Lift the Cap on Kids (SD1762/HD1262) the centerpiece of a campaign to repeal the Family Cap, a law which denies TAFDC cash assistance to a child born after the family first received TAFDC.
- Reproductive Rights: An Act relative to Advancing Contraception Coverage and Economic Security in our State (SD939/HD450) would codify the access to cost-free preventive care for women from ACA into state law, protecting access to no-copay birth control by requiring insurers cover all contraceptive measures approved by the FDA.
- Employment: The WBA supports two bills. An Act Establishing a Family and Medical Leave Insurance Program (SD1768/HD2573) requires employers to offer employees up to 16 weeks of paid leave for family care and up to 26 weeks for temporary disability leave. Employees would be eligible for such benefits after 1,250 hours of service, the current federal Family and Medical Leave Act (FMLA) standard. An Act Establishing the Massachusetts Pregnant Workers Fairness (SD338/HD955) amends MGL §4, ch.151B to cover women (pregnant & nursing) who need minor accommodations.
- Legal Services Funding: The WBA supports a funding increase to $23M for FY2018 budget item 0321-1600: General Support for legal services, funding for Battered Women's Legal Assistance Project, a program for advocacy for Medicare and a Disability Benefits Project to correct the shameful unmet need.
- Women's Health: The WBA supports An Act to Protect Girls from Genital Mutilation (SD1466/HD2873), a redraft developed by the WBA, which would protect girls in Massachusetts from harm from female genital mutilation (FGM). FGM involves removing part or all of a girl's healthy sex organs and surrounding tissue for non-medical reasons resulting in health consequences, death in childbirth and lifelong trauma and is recognized by the UN as a violation of human rights.
- Civil Rights In order to protect transgender people, the WBA supports a bill to add "gender identity or expression" to hate crimes and employment, housing, credit, public accommodation and education non-discrimination laws. An Act Relative to Transgender Equal Rights (S764/H502).

=== Recent legislative achievements ===
- Employment: An Act to Establish Pay Equity to protect employees' freedom of speech regarding pay, eliminate the use of salary history in the hiring process, require compensation to be based on comparable skill, effort, responsibility, and working conditions and require employers to include minimum pay in job postings. Signed into law as Chapter 177 of the Acts of 2016 on 8/16.
- Transgender Civil Rights: An Act Relative to Gender Identity and Nondiscrimination added public accommodations to the list of areas in which transgender people cannot be discriminated against. Signed into law as Chapter 134 of the Acts of 2016 on 7/16.
- Parental Leave: an Act Relative to Parental Leave making it explicit that parental leave benefits apply to men as well as women was signed into law in 1/15 as Chapter 484 of the Acts of 2014.
- Domestic Violence: An Act Relative to Domestic Violence, signed into law in 8/14 as Chapter 260 of the Acts of 2014 establishes new criminal offenses related to domestic violence including provisions dealing with strangulation, creates new legal protections for victims, prohibits the use of accord and satisfaction in domestic violence cases, corrects flaws in MGL ch. 265 § 13M and adds workplace protections to victims of domestic violence.
- Reproductive Rights: An Act to Promote Public Safety and Protect Access to Reproductive Health Care Facilities, which was signed into law 7/14, was filed in response to the McCullen v. Coakley decision by the United States Supreme Court, which struck down portions of the Massachusetts buffer zone statute, G.L. c. 266, §120E1/2, that established a 35-foot fixed buffer zone around driveways and entrances of reproductive health care facilities.
- Employment: An Act to Establish Domestic Workers Bill of Rights was signed into law 6/14 as Chapter 148 of the Acts of 2014.
- Women in Prison: An Act Relative to Safe Pregnancies and Related Health Care for Female Inmates (in State Prisons, County Houses of Correction and Jails) which prohibits shackling during delivery and requires pre- and post-natal services signed by Governor 5/14 as Chapter 103 of the Acts of 2014.
- Domestic Violence/Housing: An Act Relative to Housing Rights of Victims of Domestic Violence, Rape, Sexual Assault and Stalking was signed by governor 1/13. It amends the existing housing discrimination laws to prohibit discrimination against victims of domestic violence, rape, sexual assault and stalking (while also preserving the rights of property owners), to create a defense to eviction and a vehicle for victims to vacate their lease or rental agreements without penalty.
- Midwifery: An Act Relative to Enhancing the Practice of Nurse Midwives, was signed into law by the governor on February 2, 2012, as Chapter 24 of the Acts of 2012. The law increases the autonomy of certified nurse-midwives, and among other provisions authorizes certified nurse-midwives to issue written prescriptions and order and interpret tests and therapeutics.
- Transgender Civil Rights: The law to add "gender identity or expression" to hate crimes and employment, housing, credit and education non-discrimination laws, joining 15 other states in recognizing transgender people as a protected class, was signed by governor 11/11.
- Human Trafficking: The WBA supported anti-human trafficking legislation, which was signed by the governor on 11/2011. This law makes human trafficking a crime in Massachusetts. The law makes patronizing a human trafficking victim a crime and creates higher penalties for victims who are minors. This law also allows forfeited assets and fines related to human trafficking to be distributed to victims.
- Alimony: The WBA worked to update/reform Mass. alimony law which benefits all parties to alimony arrangements by creating different categories of alimony with set limitations. The law also provides an important safeguard for families that do not fit squarely within the guidelines by including discretion for courts to address their needs in alimony orders. Signed by the governor 9/11.

== WBA committees ==
The WBA has a total of 30 committees, created to meet the individual needs of all women lawyers.

=== Policy and general-interest committees ===
- Alternative Dispute Resolution The Alternative Dispute Resolution Committee discusses issues facing women attorneys in the alternative dispute resolution area, including mediation, arbitration, and other forms of conflict management.
- Amicus The Amicus Committee writes amicus briefs on various issues affecting women and the law. The briefs are intended to assist the Court in resolving often controversial legal issues.
- Appointments, Awards & Endorsements The Appointments, Awards and Endorsements Committee ("AA&E") actively encourages and supports women interested in nomination to the bench.
- Business Development The mission of the Business Development Committee is to promote the success of women in the law by creating an open environment to understand and build the skills necessary to develop business.
- Communications The Communications Committee is dedicated to promoting the organization's public presence.
- Employment Issues This committee is concerned with issues affecting women in the practice of law, such as part-time work issues, issues surrounding the evaluation process, and issues concerning the so-called glass ceiling.
- Government Lawyers The Government Lawyers Committee addresses issues inherent in government and public service.
- In-House Counsel The In-House Counsel Committee of the Women's Bar Association is committed to connecting women who work in-house with each other and other members of the WBA.
- Judicial Pipeline The Judicial Pipeline Committee coaches women through the judicial application process and works to promote a diverse bench.
- Law Firm Advancement The mission of Law Firm Advancement Committee is to develop and advance the careers of women in law firms.
- Law Students The Law Student Committee is designed to meet the needs of women law students.
- Legislative Policy The Legislative Policy Committee monitors the WBA Legislative Agenda. They prepare testimony for hearings and letters to elected officials on the bills and issues we support or oppose.
- Membership The membership committee of the Women's Bar Association is committed to increasing the membership ranks of the WBA by reaching out to law students and attorneys in all walks of legal practice.
- Mothers' Forum The Mothers' Forum Committee seeks to provide a forum for women to discuss issues related to balancing home and family commitments with being a lawyer.
- New Lawyers The New Lawyer Committee seeks to provide a forum for new women lawyers to share their experiences, draw on each other's knowledge, provide advice on rising in the ranks, and meet new people.
- Rosa Parks This committee addresses the concerns of legal services attorneys, bar advocates, public counsel and other attorneys working in the non-profit and non-traditional law firm settings that focus primarily upon the representation of indigent and low-income clients, civil rights, activism and advocacy to bring about positive social change.
- Senior Practice Group This committee focuses on topics of interest and concern to attorneys who have reached a level of seniority and expertise in their legal fields and/or workplaces.
- Solo and Small Firm The committee has developed a network of solo and small firm practitioners who provide advice on substantive areas of law, client management, office administration, and other questions.
- Women of Color It is this committee's goal and mission to promote women of color in the legal profession for their multitude of successes and to honor them for their personal and professional accomplishments.
- Women in the Courtroom The Women in the Courtroom Committee offers opportunities for networking, informal mentoring, education, and information sharing for women litigators.

=== Geographical interest committees ===
- Cape Cod and The Islands
- Central Massachusetts
- Greater Boston Committee
- Metro West
- Middlesex County
- New Bedford/Fall River Area
- North of Boston
- South Shore
- Western Massachusetts

== Annual events and programs ==
Individual WBA committees hold socials and meetings all throughout the year. Additionally, the WBA offers programs and workshops to help women market themselves, to assist members in building practices, and to expose women to important business development opportunities. Some of these events have included: Mentoring Circles, Speed-Networking, "Work/Life Balance," "Demystifying the Path to Government Appointments," "Women In Politics: Challenges And Trends," as well as various panel discussions and guest speakers.

Each year, the WBA also hosts their annual WBA Gala, which is a fundraiser where proceeds go toward supporting the continuance of the WBA. There is also an annual legislative breakfast, in which WBA members discuss new policy objectives and reflect on past achievements. There is also the WBA Annual Meeting & Newly Admitted Lawyers Reception and the Annual Summer Associate, Law Clerk and Intern Reception.

== WBA publications ==
The WBA has a newly designed, interactive web site, and also publishes the Women's Bar Review, a quarterly newspaper, and the annual Chronicle magazine.

The WBA Employment Issues Committee also publishes an annual "Employment Report" on women attorneys in Massachusetts.

== Leadership ==
=== 2015-2016 WBA president ===
- Kristin W. Shirahama

=== WBA executive committee ===
- President-elect: Michele Liu Baillie
- Vice president, membership: Bronwyn Roberts
- Vice president, operations: Marie Chafe
- Treasurer: Jennifer Saubermann
- Secretary: Nicole Forbes
