= Political positions of Elizabeth Warren =

Warren speaking with supporters at a campaign rally at Laney College in Oakland, California.

Elizabeth Warren is the senior United States senator from Massachusetts. She is a member of the Democratic Party.

Warren was a candidate in the 2020 Democratic Party presidential primaries, ultimately placing third behind Bernie Sanders, and eventual winner Joe Biden.

Widely regarded as a progressive, she was previously a registered Republican, changing her registration to Democrat in 1996. According to Warren, in the six presidential elections she voted in before 1996, she cast her ballot for just one GOP nominee—Gerald Ford in 1976. Her conservatism at the time was not rooted in social issues like abortion or gay rights, but rather on economic policy.

== Economic policy ==
Warren believes that America has both a short-term and a long-term jobs problem. She notes that China spends 9% of its GDP on infrastructure, and Europe spends about 5% of GDP, while the US is spending only 2.4% and is looking for cuts. She supports a small tax increase on those making more than $1 million per year to pay for jobs such as rebuilding the roads, bridges, and water systems. She believes that the added money in circulation would help to build the economy as well.

Warren has a long record of working to assist self-employed workers and small businesses. She believes small business owners "need straightforward rules that any small business can deal with" rather than the present situation of "complex regulations that take an army of lawyers to work through." Warren supports making it easier for workers to organize for better wages, for better health care, and for better working conditions.

Warren has proposed an economic program based on "economic patriotism," which includes investing $2 trillion in climate-friendly industries, creating a new Department of Economic Development, and implementing measures to support exports. Her plan aims to support American workers and manufacturing, echoing President Trump's goal, but not his means such as tariffs and tight immigration restrictions.

=== Agriculture ===
In March 2019, Warren was one of thirty-eight senators to sign a letter to Secretary of Agriculture Sonny Perdue warning that dairy farmers "have continued to face market instability and are struggling to survive the fourth year of sustained low prices" and urging his department to "strongly encourage these farmers to consider the Dairy Margin Coverage program."

Warren opposes the growing dominance of foreign entities in the U.S. agricultural sector, saying “no foreign country should be able to purchase farmland in America.”

Warren has been critical of concentrated animal feeding operations. In 2019, Elizabeth Warren publicly endorsed a federal moratorium on new factory farms and the expansion of existing ones, signaling support for more stringent regulation of industrial agriculture. That year, she also cosponsored a bill that would have imposed such a moratorium. At the time, Warren said: “For years and years, giant multinational corporations have been crushing competition in the agricultural sector and seizing key markets while regulators have looked the other way,” adding that “[t]he Covid-19 crisis is making it even easier for Big Ag to get even bigger and gobble up small farms — leaving farmers out in the cold and consumers facing higher costs and fewer choices.”

=== Antitrust, competition and corporate regulation ===
Warren has cosponsored the Reward Work Act of 2018, to reform U.S. labor law and corporate law by guaranteeing the right of employees in listed companies to elect one-third of the board of directors. In August 2018, Warren introduced the Accountable Capitalism Act, which would require 40% employee representation on boards of corporations with over $1bn income, require such enterprises to obtain a "federal charter of corporate citizenship" which would mandate social responsibility by enshrining a kind of triple bottom line, and require 75% shareholder and board member approval for political donations. It would also set limits on executive sales of company stock received as compensation to at least five years after reception, and at least three years after a stock buyback.

In March 2019, Warren outlined a plan for greater regulation and competition in the tech sector. The plan encompassed measures to roll back consolidation of the tech market, and rules forbidding the sharing of user data with third parties and barring large online retailers from participating in the marketplaces they offer with their own products/services. The plan would levy more stringent regulations on the largest tech companies while sparing smaller ones. In a statement announcing the plan, Warren said the measures were intended "[to] restore the balance of power in our democracy, to promote competition, and to ensure that the next generation of technology innovation is as vibrant as the last" and called for the "break up [of] our biggest tech companies".

In March 2019, Warren was one of six senators to sign a letter to the Federal Trade Commission (FTC) requesting it "use its rulemaking authority, along with other tools, in order to combat the scourge of non-compete clauses rigging our economy against workers" and espousing the view that non-compete clauses "harm employees by limiting their ability to find alternate work, which leaves them with little leverage to bargain for better wages or working conditions with their immediate employer." The senators furthered that the FTC had the responsibility of protecting both consumers and workers and needed to "act decisively" to address their concerns over "serious anti-competitive harms from the proliferation of non-competes in the economy."

In June 2019, along with Bernie Sanders and Cory Booker, Warren sent a letter to the Federal Communications Commission (FCC) and Department of Justice requesting an investigation into the acquisition of 21 regional sports networks by Sinclair Broadcast Group as the senators found Sinclair to have "an explicit interest in, and commitment to, relaying partisan political messages to its viewers — making its recent anti competitive expansion attempts into millions of additional households all the more concerning."

=== Gambling ===
Warren said in 2014: "[G]ambling can also be a real problem, economically, for a lot of people. I didn't support gambling the first time around and I don't expect to support it." She opposed Massachusetts' 2011 law implementing Las Vegas-style gambling and she supported its 2014 repeal initiative.

=== Housing ===
In April 2019, Warren was one of 41 senators to sign a bipartisan letter to the housing subcommittee praising the United States Department of Housing and Urban Development's Section 4 Capacity Building program as authorizing "HUD to partner with national nonprofit community development organizations to provide education, training, and financial support to local community development corporations (CDCs) across the country" and expressing disappointment that President Trump's budget "has slated this program for elimination after decades of successful economic and community development." The senators wrote of their hope that the subcommittee would support continued funding for Section 4 in Fiscal Year 2020.

=== Labor ===
Warren is in favor of increasing the minimum wage and has argued that if the minimum wage had followed increases in worker productivity in the United States, it would now be at least $15 an hour.

In July 2015, Warren was one of 77 Democratic members of Congress to unveil the Schedules that Work Act, authorizing employees of companies with over 15 workers to have the right to request changes in their schedules without potential retaliation and mandating that employers consider the request if the schedule change is based around child or elder care, a second job, continued education, job training or because of a health condition. Warren said, "A worker who is told to wait around on-call for hours with no guarantee of work hours should get something for his time. It's time to end unfair scheduling practices that hurt workers and families."

In June 2018, Warren was one of eight senators to sponsor a bill amending the Fair Labor Standards Act of 1938 to include a mandate requiring farmers pay workers time and a half for each hour worked past the standard 40-hour work week.

In July 2019, Warren signed a letter to Labor Secretary Alexander Acosta that advocated for the U.S. Occupational Safety and Health Administration (OSHA) to initiate a full investigation into a complaint filed on May 20 by a group of Chicago-area employees of McDonald's, which detailed workplace violence incidents that included interactions with customers such as customers throwing hot coffee and threatening employees with firearms and more. The senators argued that McDonald's could and needed to "do more to protect its employees, but employers will not take seriously their obligations to provide a safe workplace if OSHA does not enforce workers rights to a hazard-free workplace."

=== Taxes ===
Warren supports the Buffett Rule, which would restore the Clinton tax rates on the top income bracket. She believes that the added revenues should be used to make college more affordable and help students pay off their student loans.

In a November 2015 speech to the National Press Club, Warren said, "Only one problem with the over-taxation story: It's not true. There is a problem with the corporate tax code, but that isn't it." She advocated for a permanent increase in the share of long-term revenues paid by large corporations, leveling the playing field between small and big businesses, and promoting investment in American jobs.

In December 2015, Warren and Representative Elijah Cummings called for Congress to compose a set of benefits for low-income families that would be permanent as part of massive package of year-end tax breaks that was being developed at the time. Warren credited the Earned Income Tax Credit and the Child Tax Credit as the federal programs contributing the most to the reduction of child poverty while saying that the value of the CTC had eroded due to its credit not having been indexed.

In September 2016, after the European Union ruled that Apple Inc. owed Ireland $14.5 billion in back taxes, Warren wrote an op-ed opining that the door was open for Congress to pass their "own corporate tax code, which has allowed the biggest multinationals to shirk their obligations for decades" and "the commission's announcement was the latest sign that multinational corporations are running out of places to hide from paying taxes." She observed that "the current generation of corporate winners" would have to pay their fair share in order for "the next generation of prosperous American companies" to be ushered in along with investments in "broad-based economic growth" to be feasible.

In December 2016, Warren, Tammy Baldwin, and Sheldon Whitehouse unveiled a bill curbing Trump cabinet nominees from avoiding paying large amounts of taxes upon assuming their positions through the addition of a cap on the amount of capital gains an appointee could defer at $1 million. In a press release, Warren said, "Not only is Donald Trump giving a gang of billionaires control of our government, he's offering them a special tax break just for signing up. This bill would stop billionaires from getting yet another special favor from Donald Trump."

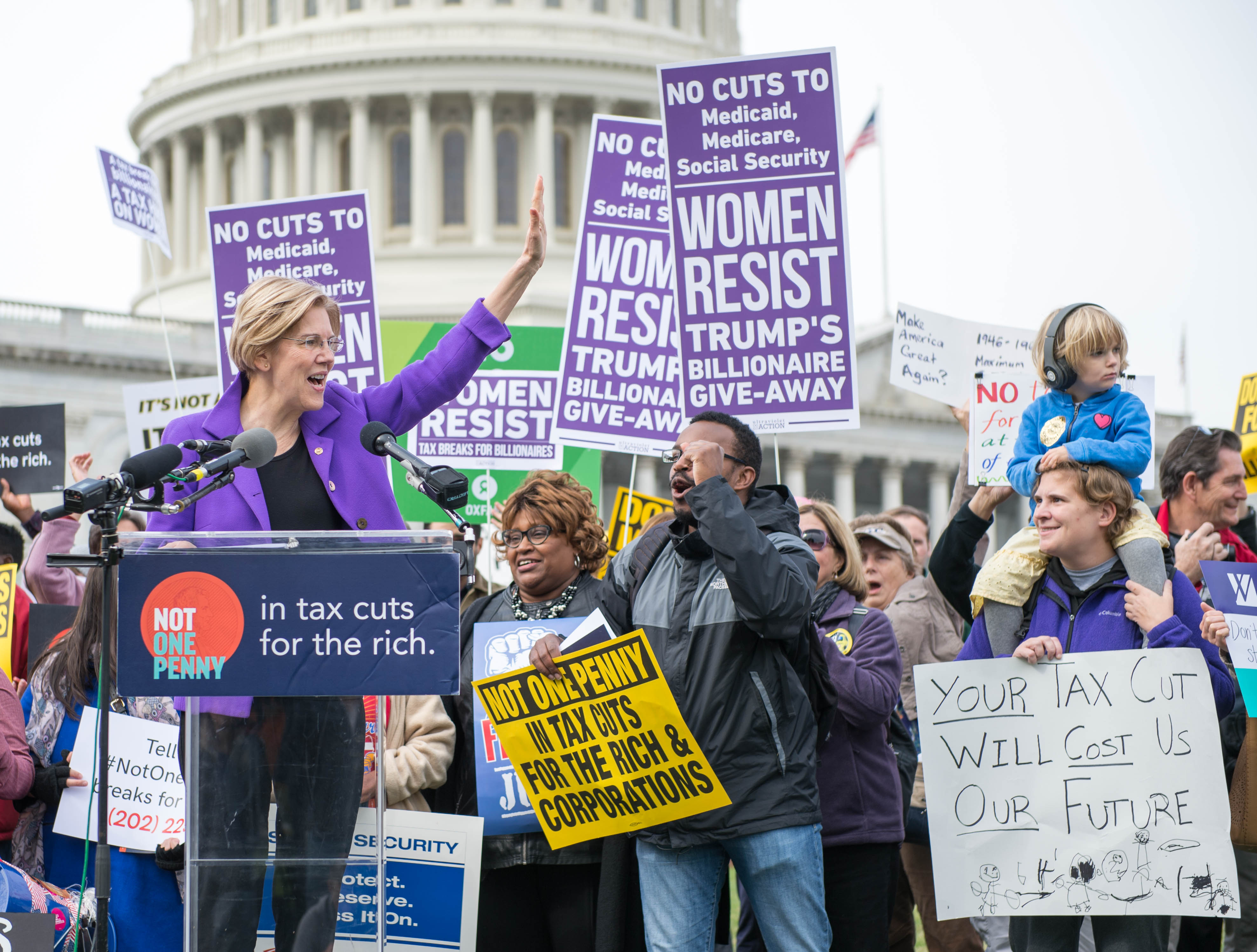
Warren speaking at a protest against the Tax Cut and Jobs Act of 2017

Warren opposed the Tax Cuts and Jobs Act of 2017, which she voted against. In September 2017 Warren criticized the proposed tax legislation declaring that it, "Delivers massive tax cuts to millionaires and giant corporations and kicks working families to the curb". In October 2017, regarding the Trump administration's proposed tax reform, Warren said, "Trump’s tax plan is simple. The rich get richer, and everyone else gets left behind. It is just plain immoral at a time when the top 1 percent are already getting richer and richer and working families are scraping to pay for housing and schools and child care; it is just plain immoral to slash taxes for the rich while sticking it to everyone else."

In April 2019, Warren proposed the "Real Corporate Profits Tax" which would consider as the corporate tax base profits that enterprises disclose to investors instead of profits reported to the IRS only. Under the proposal, announced profits would be taxed at a flat rate of 7% for every dollar above $100M, and would apply to an estimated 1,200 public corporations. The tax would limit enterprises' capacity for tax avoidance/sheltering since it would apply to overall global profits, and would not allow for reduction of the tax burden via tax deductions or credits. The tax would exist in parallel with (or, rather, on top of) the corporate income tax, and would be akin to the alternative minimum tax levied upon some individuals, imposing a minimum tax (including) on corporations that hitherto would have had been paying little to no in corporate income taxes.

==== Wealth tax ====
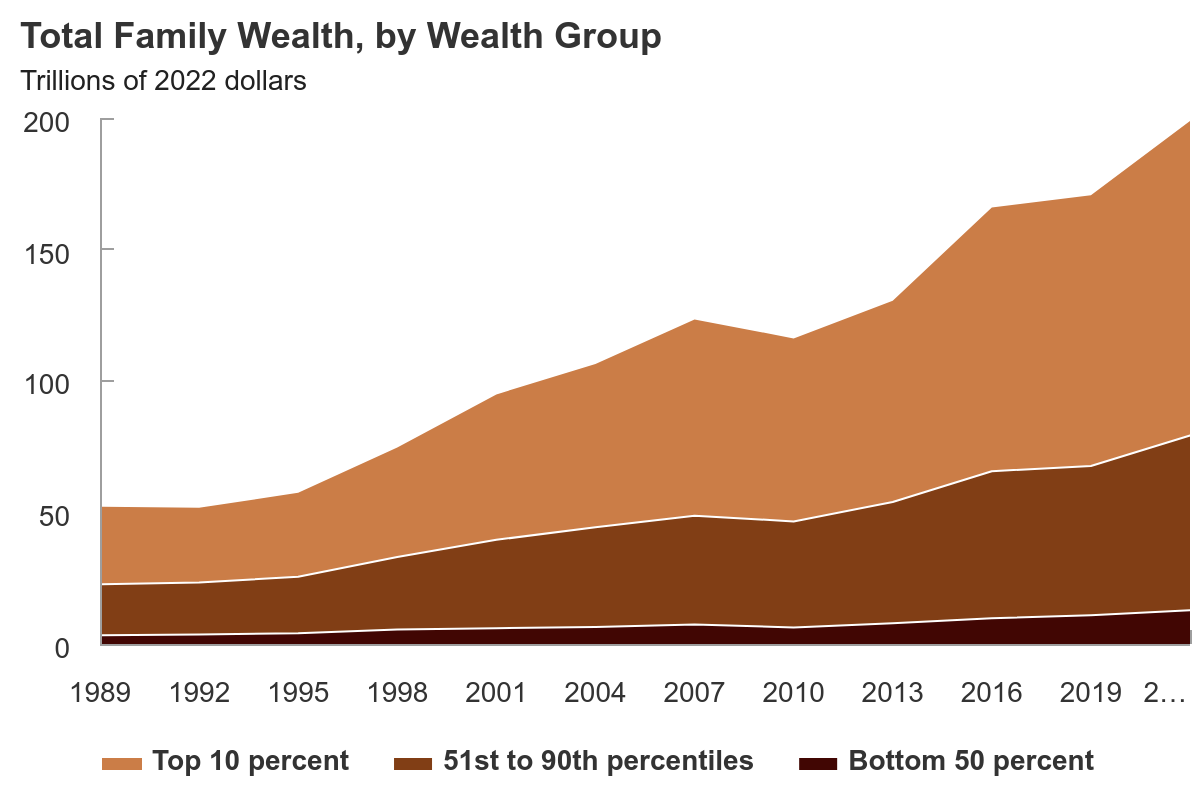
Wealth inequality in the United States increased from 1989 to 2013.

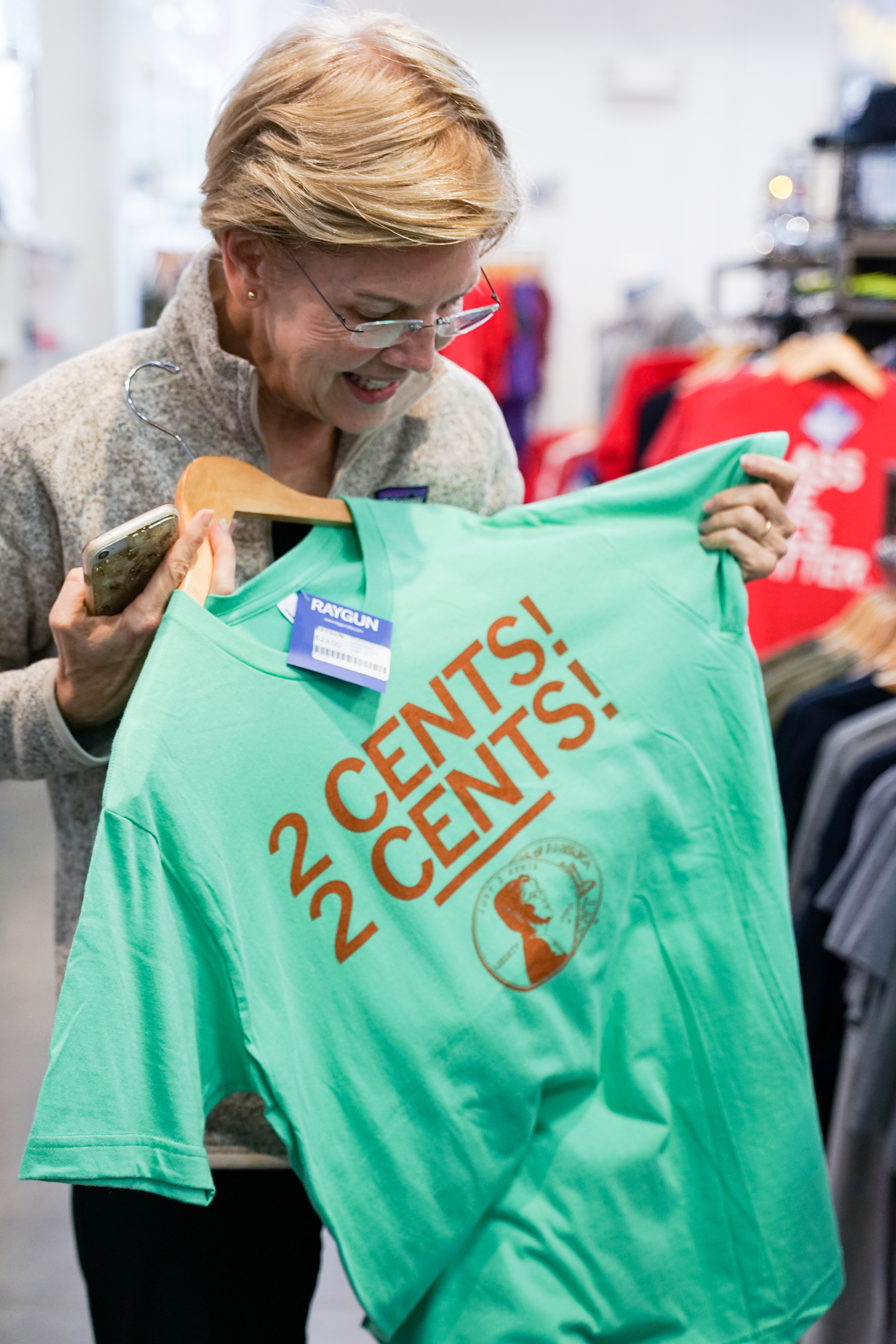
Warren holding a t-shirt promoting her proposed "Ultra-Millionaire Tax"

As part of her presidential campaign, Warren proposed an annual wealth tax ("Ultra-Millionaire Tax") in January 2019. The proposal would levy a 2% annual tax on household net worth above $50M, and a 3% annual tax on net worth above $1bn. The tax would affect an estimated 75,000 households, and would yield $1.9tn or $2.75tn over a 10-year period, according to two different initial estimates. The proposal also includes provisions to combat tax evasion and avoidance, increasing the IRS budget to enforce the tax, requiring a minimum audit rate for entities subject to the tax, and levying a 40% "exit tax" on wealth above $50M to combat tax avoidance by means of renouncing US citizenship. The plan would also encourage the IRS to close loopholes in asset valuation, and increase oversight over wealth in known tax havens. Warren had previously informally voiced support for a tax on wealth during a discussion with Thomas Piketty in 2014. The 2019 proposal was in line with the recommendations of Piketty who promptly endorsed the plan.

=== Trade ===
Warren believes that the United States needs to strengthen trade laws and ensure the enforcement of them.

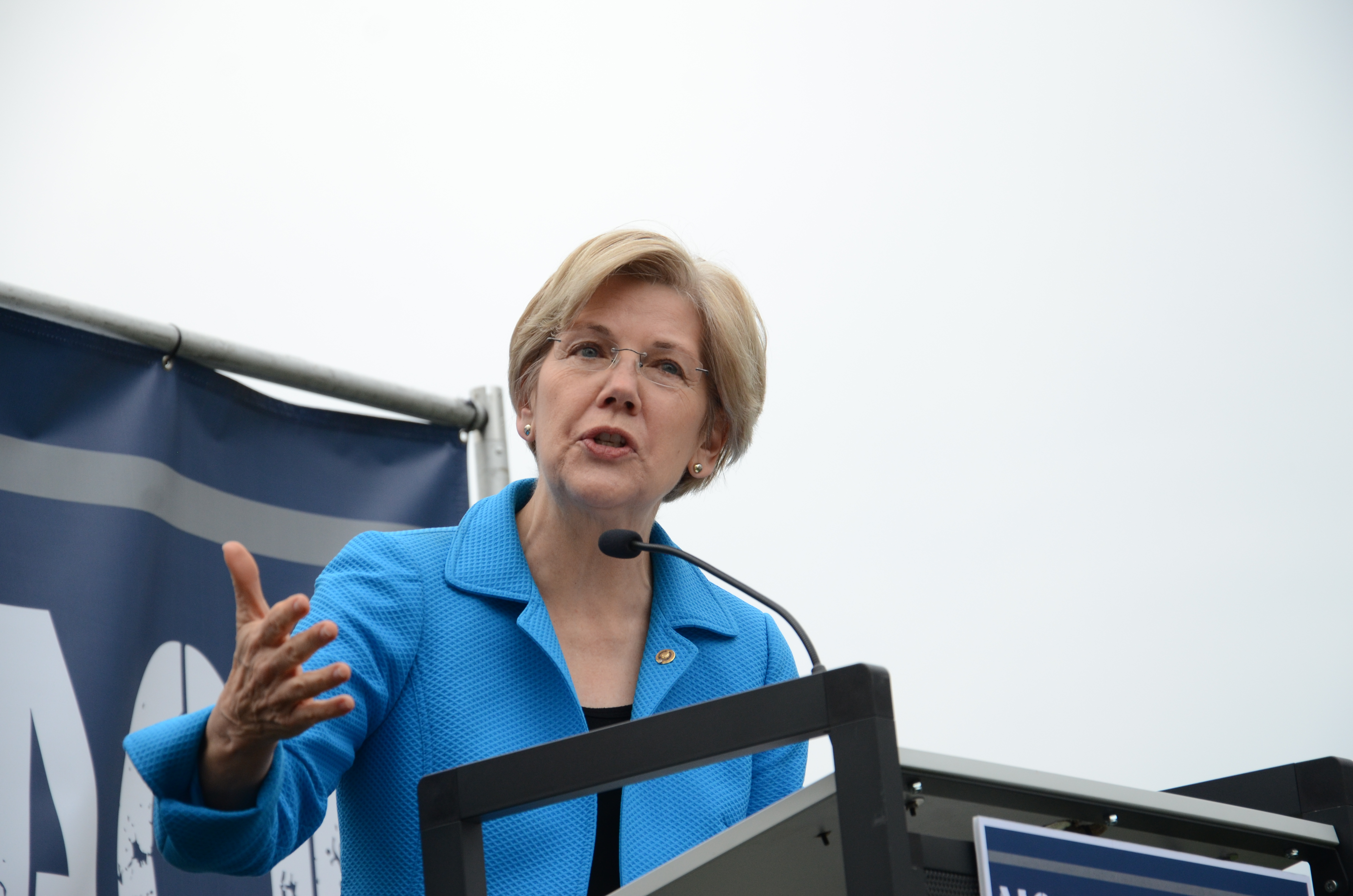
Warren speaks at an April 2015 protest against efforts to "fast track" the passage of the Trans-Pacific Partnership.

Warren has criticized former President Barack Obama's support of the Trans-Pacific Partnership, believing that it gives corporations too much power and will negatively affect workers, and that the content of the agreement should not be secret.

In September 2016, Warren was one of twelve senators to sign a letter to President Obama asserting that the passage of the Trans-Pacific Partnership "in its current form will perpetuate a trade policy that advantages corporations at the expense of American workers" and there would be an "erosion of U.S. manufacturing and middle class jobs, and accelerate the corporate race to the bottom" if provisions were not fixed.

In February 2018, Warren was one of six senators to sign a letter to President Trump calling on him to rewrite the North American Free Trade Agreement through the addition of strong labor and environmental provisions and bring a cessation to the outsourcing of American jobs while protecting air and water and reducing prescription drug prices. They also called for the administration to take action on climate change and raising the living standards for Americans as well as denizens of Mexico and Canada.

Warren believes that changes need to be made to the United States–Mexico–Canada Agreement.

In March 2018, after President Trump announced 5 percent tariffs on steel imports and 10 percent on aluminum, Warren stated that she was "not afraid of tariffs" and that she wanted "to see a trade policy that puts American workers first, puts American small businesses first, puts American consumers first." During an appearance on CNN, Warren said, "When President Trump says he's putting tariffs on the table, I think tariffs are one part of reworking our trade policy overall" and that previous policies on trade had boosted profits at multinational corporations.

=== Transportation ===
==== Infrastructure ====
In January 2018, Warren was one of ten senators to sign a letter to President Trump encouraging him "to not only protect existing 'Buy America' laws, but to work with Congress to expand these protections and address coverage gaps" while the administration's infrastructure proposal was being drafted in addition to the assertion that "no infrastructure proposal should allow circumvention of current requirements in federal law that ensure our public infrastructure is built with American-made iron, steel, and manufactured materials by workers who are paid a fair wage."

==== Railroad safety ====
In June 2019, Warren was one of ten senators to cosponsor the Safe Freight Act, a bill that would mandate all freight trains have one or more certified conductors and one certified engineer on board who can collaborate on how to protect both the train and people living near the tracks' safety. The legislation was meant to correct a rollback of the Federal Railroad Administration on a proposed rule intended to establish safety standards.

== Education policy ==
Warren has frequently expressed concern about the amount of debt college graduates face and especially so when they are often unable to find employment after graduation. At her senate website she states:

As I travel all across the Commonwealth, I meet young people who have done everything right: they played by the rules, they worked hard, they finished college, and yet they're finding themselves unemployed, drowning in debt, and in many cases, moving back home with mom and dad. These young people did all we asked of them - and they're getting slammed.

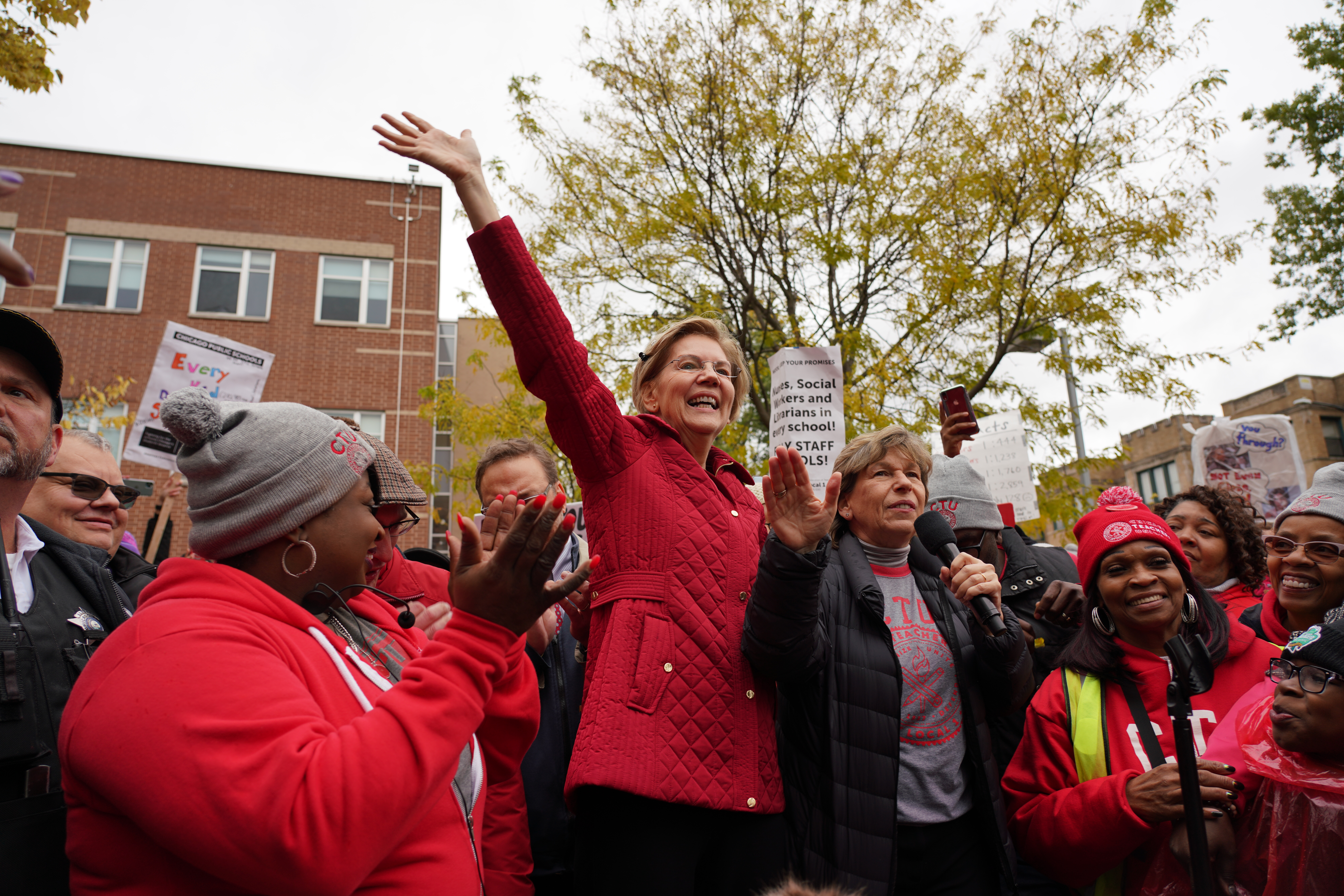
Warren standing in solidarity with striking teachers during the 2019 Chicago Public Schools Strike

In April 2015, Warren and U.S. Representative Elijah Cummings from Maryland's 7th congressional district co-hosted a forum on college affordability at the University of Massachusetts Boston.

Warren has introduced legislation to reduce the interest rates on student loans. She sees the passage of legislation that would support students as a test of who legislators are working for: "...armies of lawyers and lobbyists to protect tax loopholes for billionaires and profits for the big banks ... or those who work hard, play by the rules, and are trying to build a future for themselves and their families?"

In a book authored with her daughter, The Two-Income Trap: Why Middle-Class Mothers and Fathers Are Going Broke, Warren has expressed support for the concepts of school choice and for vouchers. On her campaign website, she expressed dislike of vouchers and strong reservations about charter schools.

In March 2016, following an inspector's general report that blamed the Education Department for not protecting student borrowers in the military, Warren was one of four Democratic senators to send a letter to Acting Education Secretary John King Jr. calling on King to correct the "injustice" of military members being overcharged for their student loans.

In June 2017, along with Ron Wyden, Mike Lee, and Tim Scott, Warren introduced legislation allowing graduate students to allocate money from stipends and fellowships into tax-deferred individual retirement accounts (IRAs). In a news release, Warren said the "bipartisan bill opens a door for students who want to do the right thing and start saving early for their futures."

In June 2018, Warren and Representative Raja Krishnamoorthi wrote a letter to the inspector general of the Education Department after an ABC report "revealed that Mr. (Robert) Eitel played a more central role than previously indicated in the Department's decision to delay the enforcement of borrower defense and gainful employment, and raised questions about whether key Department officials have provided full and complete information to Congress". Warren and Krishnamoorthi expressed that they were "deeply troubled that Mr. Eitel's questionable compliance with federal ethics rules, including his apparently misleading testimony to Congress, signal a critical breakdown in federal ethics at the Department of Education, which requires urgent attention and remedy" and requested the inspector general to investigate the role of Eitel in the gainful employment and borrower defense rules.

In February 2019, Warren unveiled a universal child care plan - the "Universal Child Care and Early Learning Act" - that would establish a network of government-funded child care (day care and pre-school) facilities available to all pre-school age children, partly by building upon the Head Start program. The facilities would be subsidized; parents would be charged according to their ability to pay with families earning less than 200% of the federal poverty level being granted free access, while the top contribution would be capped at 7% of parental income. Costs would be limited by the government. The project would be funded by windfalls from another of Warren's proposals, the "Ultra-Millionaire tax". The childcare workers (who have tended to be poorly paid) would be paid on-par with public school teachers. Warren was the first 2020 Democratic Primary contender to present a plan on child care.

In March 2019, Warren was one of thirteen senators to sign a letter to Education Secretary Betsy Devos calling for the Education Department to do more to assist Argosy University students as they faced campus closures across the US and critiquing the Education Department as failing to provide adequate measures to protect students or keep them notified of ongoing updates.

At a January 2020 campaign stop in Cedar Rapids, Iowa, Warren promised: "I'm going to have a Secretary of Education that a young trans person interviews on my behalf, and only if this person believes that our Secretary or Secretary of Education nominee is absolutely committed to creating a welcoming environment, a safe environment, and a full educational curriculum for everyone will that person actually be advanced to be Secretary of Education."

In early February 2021, Warren supported a plan to cancel up to $50,000 in student loan debt for approximately 44 million Americans who have federal student loans. She has asked President Biden to forgive this debt by using executive order rather than going through the legislative process that would likely get bogged down in partisanship. Warren told The Boston Globe, "It would close the racial wealth gap among those with student loan debt by 25 points. It would boost a faltering economy. And it is fundamentally the right thing to do."

== Energy and environmental policy ==
Warren supports investing in renewable energy rather than "hand[ing] out massive tax breaks to [nonrenewable] energy companies that are among the most profitable corporations in the world." She says that "as long as we subsidize dirty sources like oil, gas, and coal, we threaten the air we breathe and the water we drink." She also believes our reliance on oil and gas "...puts us at the mercy of OPEC. We are more likely to prop up foreign dictators or become entangled in wars that are about our energy needs rather than our long-term, strategic interests ... Investing in clean energy technology is investing in our health, our environmental security, our national security, and our economic security."

In June 2017, after President Trump announced the United States was withdrawing from the Paris Agreement, Warren said the withdrawal was "a big gift to Republican donors" rather than about "jobs versus the environment". She furthered, "In this democracy, government can be seized by a handful of people with money who can get government to tilt in their direction. Money slithers through Washington like a snake."

In May 2018, Warren and Bernie Sanders wrote a letter to President Trump calling on the president to select an individual who takes climate change seriously as his next Homeland Security adviser, warning that without "a dedicated federal effort to reduce the quantity of greenhouse gasses that human activity releases into the atmosphere, climate change will continue to worsen and cause increasingly severe weather events, including hurricanes" and that climate change had previously and would continue to "have a tangible and harmful impact on our national security and disaster readiness."

In September 2018, Warren proposed the Climate Risk Disclosure Act, requiring companies to make disclosures relating to climate change including companies' greenhouse gas emissions, fossil fuel holdings, and how they would be impacted by climate policies in addition to ways they could be hurt by climate effects like rising sea levels. In a statement, Warren said climate change was "a real and present danger — and it will have an enormous effect on the value of company assets" and that the legislation would "use market forces to speed up the transition from fossil fuels to cleaner energy — reducing the odds of an environmental and financial disaster without spending a dime of taxpayer money."

In February 2019, in response to reports of the EPA intending to decide against setting drinking water limits for perfluorooctane sulfonic acid (PFOS) and perfluorooctanoic acid (PFOA) as part of an upcoming national strategy to manage the aforementioned class of chemicals, Warren was one of twenty senators to sign a letter to Acting EPA Administrator Andrew R. Wheeler calling on the agency "to develop enforceable federal drinking water standards for PFOA and PFOS, as well as institute immediate actions to protect the public from contamination from additional per- and polyfluoroalkyl substances (PFAS)."

In March 2019, when the Green New Deal came up for a vote in the Senate, Warren and 41 other Senate Democrats voted "present", which was anticipated as ahead of the vote as a means of most Democrats not having to take a formal position on the legislation.

In April 2019, Warren sent a letter to Chairman of the Joint Chiefs of Staff Gen. Joseph Dunford asserting that the Defense Department "must do more than simply acknowledge or take piecemeal actions to address climate change while it increasingly threatens and harms our military's infrastructure and operations" and that the US adapting to climate change was "a necessary component of maintaining readiness." She recounted the testimonies of high-ranking military officials to the Senate Armed Services Committee, noting that they all "acknowledged the threat of climate change to our military’s infrastructure and operations, and that adapting to climate change is a factor in military readiness", citing this "uniformity of opinion among military leaders" as underscoring her position on "the need to act vigorously and expeditiously to mitigate this threat." Warren requested that Dunford submit summaries of the Pentagon's approach to building resistance to climate change risks and curbing it as well as an update on implementation of the GAO recommendations.

== Foreign policy ==
=== East Asia ===
==== China ====
In March 2018, during a three-day visit to Beijing, Warren claimed that US policy encouraging the opening of markets in China through free trade has not been successful. She advocated against the United States having a more integrated economic system with China if the latter country continued failing "to respect basic human rights".

In November 2018, Warren joined Senators Chris Coons, Marco Rubio and a bipartisan group of lawmakers in sending a letter to the Trump administration raising concerns about China's undue influence over media outlets and academic institutions in the United States. They wrote: "In American news outlets, Beijing has used financial ties to suppress negative information about the CCP. In the past four years, multiple media outlets with direct or indirect financial ties to China allegedly decided not to publish stories on wealth and corruption in the CCP...Beijing has also sought to use relationships with American academic institutions and student groups to shape public discourse."

Warren and some other members of Congress introduced legislation seeking to punish China over its human rights abuses against the Uyghurs and other predominantly Muslim ethnic minorities in China's north-western province of Xinjiang. China may have imprisoned as many as 1 million Muslims in re-education camps, according to a UN estimate.

In February 2019, amid a report by the Commerce Department that ZTE had been caught illegally shipping goods of American origin to Iran and North Korea, Warren was one of seven senators to sponsor a bipartisan bill reimposing sanctions on ZTE in the event that ZTE did not honor both American laws and its agreement with the Trump administration.

In the wake of the Daryl Morey tweet about standing with Hong Kong, Warren joined fellow senators from across the political spectrum admonishing the NBA for choosing “its pocketbook over its principles”. Warren has shown strong support for the protests in Hong Kong and been adamant about being strong on China's economical power.

==== North Korea ====
In September 2017, after President Trump delivered a speech to the United Nations threatening to "totally destroy" North Korea if the United States were "forced to defend itself or its allies" and referred to North Korean leader Kim Jong Un as "Rocket Man", Warren said that attempting "to bait an unstable dictator who has nuclear weapons is not a strategy that makes America safer". Warren opined that there was no solution to North Korea that could be solved with only American military intervention: "We need to use every tool in the toolbox. And that means diplomatic efforts with the neighbors in the region and actually all around the world so that we can gather intelligence, so we can impose economic sanctions in the right way, so we can enforce those sanctions, so we can bring the right kind of pressure to bear on North Korea just to back them off this nuclear cliff." In October, Warren was one of seven senators led by Chris Murphy in introducing legislation prohibiting "funds from being used for kinetic military operations without congressional approval unless the United States faces an imminent threat or such action is necessary to defend citizens or our allies" in light of rhetorical escalation between the US and North Korea as well as "contradictory behavior from Trump and officials in his administration".

In February 2018, Warren was one of eighteen senators to sign a letter to President Trump arguing that striking North Korea with "a preventative or preemptive U.S. military strike would lack either a constitutional basis or legal authority" without congressional approval. In March, Warren confirmed she was in favor of the Trump administration planning discussions with North Korea but warned that President Trump could be taken advantage of without having State Department officials with backgrounds in diplomacy being present. She opined that there was "no military-only solution to the problems presented by North Korea, and I'm not the only one who feels that way." In May, Warren stated that she wanted the 2018 North Korea–United States summit "to work to reduce the threat to South Korea, to Japan, to our allies in the region, to the United States of America, to the entire world, but it really takes a strategy" and criticized Trump administration officials for lacking experience in diplomacy. Though she expressed her preference for President Trump succeeding in getting North Korea to surrender its nuclear capabilities, she added that this would only be possible with a "coherent and executed strategy". Following the summit, Warren issued a statement arguing that it "(didn't) change the fact that a nuclear-armed North Korea is a threat to the security of the United States, our allies, and the world. Generations of North Korean leaders have made and broken promises before—this Administration's success will be judged on whether it can eliminate Kim's nuclear weapons and verify they are gone".

=== Europe ===
==== Russia ====
On July 11, 2018, Warren tweeted: "America is strongest when we work together with our allies – including the 28 NATO members who share our democratic values. Undermining NATO is a gift to Putin that @realDonaldTrump seems all too happy to give."

During December 2018, in response to President Trump's October announcement that he intended to withdraw the United States from the Intermediate-Range Nuclear Forces Treaty, Warren was one of seven senators to cosponsor the Prevention of Arms Race Act of 2018, legislation prohibiting funding for a U.S. ground-launched or ballistic missile that had "a range of between 500 and 5,500 kilometers" until the administration provided a report meeting five specific conditions. Warren also cosponsored this legislation when it was reintroduced by Senator Jeff Merkley in the 116th United States Congress.

==== Ukraine ====
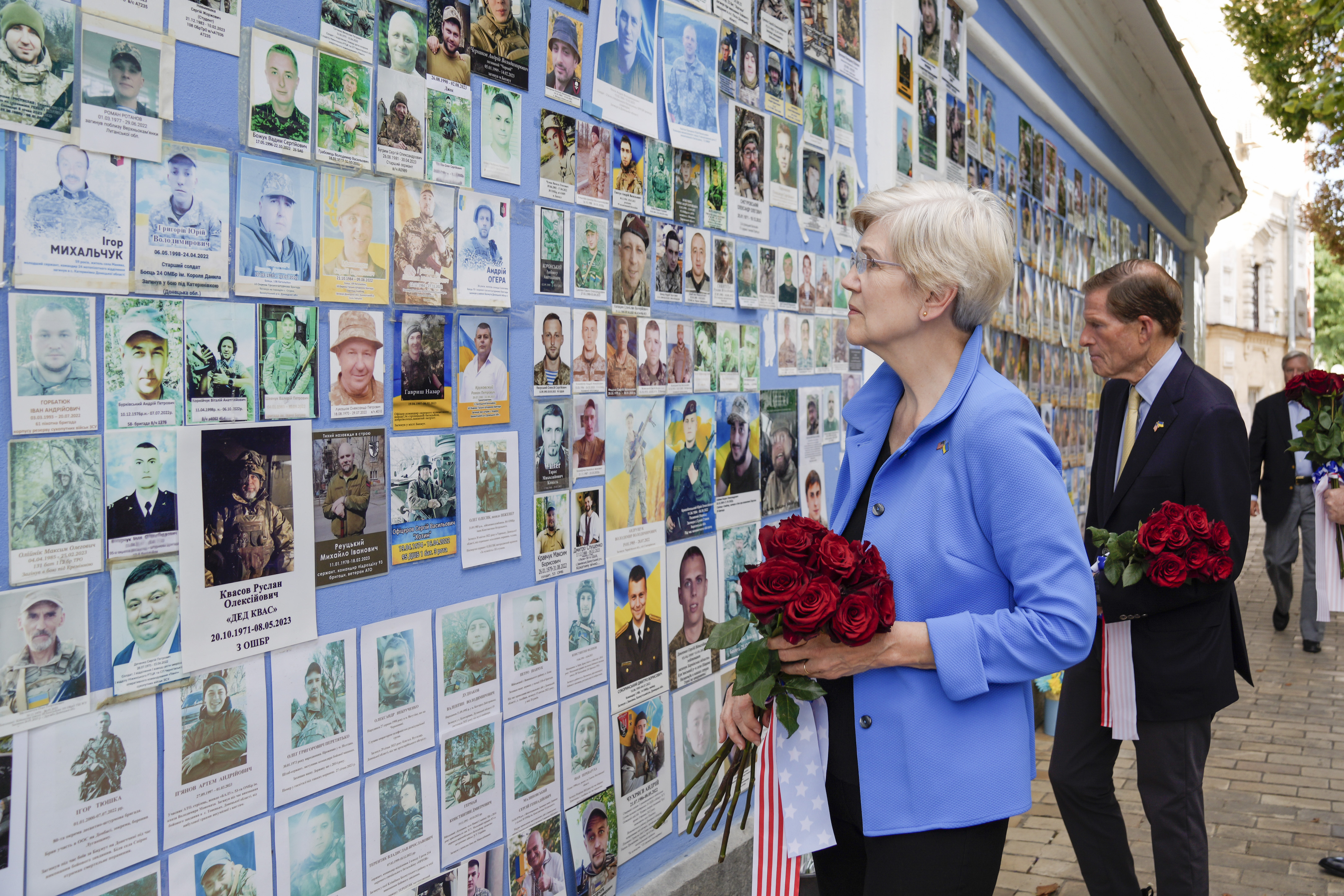
Warren at The Wall of Remembrance of the Fallen for Ukraine near Mykhailivska Square in Kyiv, Ukraine, August 23, 2023

In August 2023 Warren visited Kyiv alongside fellow senators Richard Blumenthal and Lindsey Graham. She met with Ukrainian President Volodymyr Zelenskyy, and toured Kyiv, where they viewed destroyed Russian military vehicles and The Wall of Remembrance of the Fallen for Ukraine ahead of Ukraine's Independence Day. Warren also tweeted that she stands in solidarity with the people of Ukraine "fighting for survival and democracy". She later stated that during the visit she witnessed "the courage of the Ukrainian people who will lose this war if we [US] fail to provide assistance".

In January 2025 Warren disapproved of defense nominee Michael Duffey for alleged improper withholding of aid to Ukraine, violation of U.S. Constitution and disregarding of congressional authority.

=== Latin America ===
==== Cuba ====
In July 2015, after the United States reopened its embassy in Havana, Cuba, Warren stated, "I'm not sure when it will work out to do that, but we're clearly on a path to try to develop a stronger relationship with the people of Cuba, and I think that's the right thing for us to do."

==== Venezuela ====
In January 2019, following Juan Guaidó's declaration as interim President of Venezuela, Warren told HuffPost that "the Venezuelan people deserve free and fair elections, an economy that works, and the ability to live without fear of violence from their own government", but that she opposed military intervention and sanctions on the country. However, in an appearance on Pod Save America the following month, she stated that she supported sanctions in tandem with supplying humanitarian aid to Venezuela. On June 3, Warren cosponsored S.J. Res 11: "Prohibiting Unauthorized Military Action in Venezuela Resolution of 2019."

=== South Asia ===
==== Afghanistan ====
Warren opposes continuing the war in Afghanistan and support withdrawing U.S. troops "as quickly as possible, consistent with the safety of our troops and with a transition to Afghan control." On November 29, 2018, she said: "Poppy production is up. The Taliban are on the rise. Afghan forces are taking unsustainable losses. The government is losing territory and credibility."

In 2019, Warren was one of eight lawmakers to sign a pledge by grass-roots organization Common Defense stating their intent "to fight to reclaim Congress’s constitutional authority to conduct oversight of U.S. foreign policy and independently debate whether to authorize each new use of military force" along with acting toward bringing "the Forever War to a responsible and expedient conclusion" after seventeen years of ongoing US military conflict.

In September 2019, Warren told the Washington Post, "It's long past time to bring our troops home, and I would begin to do so immediately" and that there would not be U.S. troops in Afghanistan at the end of her first term.

=== Southeast Asia ===
==== Myanmar ====
Warren condemned the genocide of the Rohingya Muslim minority in Myanmar and called for a stronger response to the crisis.

=== West Asia ===
==== Iraq ====
Warren visited US troops in Iraq in 2018. In 2020, Warren said it was a mistake for anyone to have voted for the Iraq War.

==== Iran ====
Warren has stated that Iran is a "significant threat" to the United States and its allies. In July 2017, Warren voted in favor of the Countering America's Adversaries Through Sanctions Act that grouped together sanctions against Iran, Russia and North Korea. Warren opposed the scrapping of the nuclear agreement with Iran. In May 2019 she became a cosponsor of the Prevention of Unconstitutional War with Iran Act of 2019, a bill which "prohibits funds from being used for kinetic military operations against Iran unless Congress authorizes such an action, with various exceptions such as in response to an imminent threat".

In June 2019, Warren criticized Trump's administration for escalating tensions with Iran. Warren said it would be illegal for the Trump administration to rely on a 2001 law that authorized the use of U.S. Armed Forces against those responsible for the September 11 attacks and any "associated forces". The U.S. military's 2020 Baghdad International Airport airstrike, which killed the high-level Iranian General Qasem Soleimani, brought strong reactions from around the world. Warren described the attack as wag the dog, an attempt by Trump to distract from the impeachment process through an act of war.

==== Israeli-Palestinian Conflict ====
Warren supports a secure and democratic state of Israel and wants to ensure the security of Israel from external forces such as Iran, Hezbollah, Hamas, and others. Warren states she supports a two state solution. In 2014, Warren said she believed Palestinian application for membership in the UN isn't helpful.

In a town hall meeting in August 2014, Warren stood by Israel during 2014 summer's Israel–Gaza conflict, stating that "when Hamas puts its rocket launchers next to hospitals, next to schools, they're using their civilian population to protect their military assets. And I believe Israel has a right, at that point, to defend itself". She also questioned whether future US aid to Israel should be contingent on the halting of Israeli settlements in the West Bank. In addition she defended her vote in favor of granting Israel $225 million to fund the Iron Dome air defence system.

In November 2014, in her first foreign trip since being elected to the Senate, Warren traveled to Israel and met with Prime Minister Benjamin Netanyahu. Warren aides stated the senator's intent to travel to the West Bank and Jordan as part of a trip in the Middle East that had been organized by the State Department and Senate Banking, Housing and Urban Affairs Committee.

In September 2016, ahead of a United Nations Security Council vote on a resolution condemning Israeli settlements, Warren was one of 88 senators who signed a letter to President Obama sponsored by the American Israel Public Affairs Committee, urging him to "veto any one-sided UNSC resolution that may be offered in the coming months": the resolution was approved by the Security Council 14-1-0, with the United States abstaining.

In November 2017, Warren was one of ten Democratic senators to sign a letter urging Prime Minister Netanyahu to halt the planned demolitions of Palestinian villages Khan al-Ahmar and Sussiya on the grounds that such action would further diminish efforts to seek a two-state solution and "endanger Israel's future as a Jewish democracy."

In April 2018, shortly after the beginning of the 2018 Gaza border protests, Warren said that she was "deeply concerned about the deaths and injuries in Gaza" and called on Israeli defense forces to "exercise restraint and respect the rights of Palestinians to peacefully protest."

Warren opposed a controversial pro-Israel Anti-Boycott Act initiated by Republicans, which would make it illegal for U.S. companies to engage in boycotts against Israel.

In March 2019, after Representative Ilhan Omar was criticized by Democrats and Republicans for comments about Israel she made that some condemned as anti-Semitic, Warren said they had "a moral duty to combat hateful ideologies in our own country and around the world--and that includes both anti-Semitism and Islamophobia" and added, "Branding criticism of Israel as automatically anti-Semitic has a chilling effect on our public discourse and makes it harder to achieve a peaceful solution between Israelis and Palestinians. Threats of violence -- like those made against Rep. Omar -- are never acceptable."

In October 2019, during her presidential campaign, Warren said she was open to cutting U.S. military aid to Israel if it does not stop building Israeli settlements in the West Bank.

On April 20, 2021, Warren spoke at the J Street 2021 virtual national conference and called on Israel’s elected leaders to replace Israeli Prime Minister Netanyahu and for the restricting of US aid. The following month she condemned the imminent evictions of several Palestinian families from their homes in the Sheikh Jarrah neighborhood of East Jerusalem and called on the Biden Administration to "make clear to the Israeli government that these evictions are illegal and must stop immediately".

In January 2024, Warren voted for a resolution, proposed by Bernie Sanders, to apply the human rights provisions of the Foreign Assistance Act to the Israel military assistance. The proposal was defeated 72 to 11. In April 2025, Warren voted for a pair of resolutions, proposed by Senator Bernie Sanders, to cancel the Trump's administration's sales of $8.8 billion in bombs and other munitions to Israel. The proposals were defeated, 82 to 15.

==== Saudi Arabia ====
Warren criticized U.S. involvement in the Saudi Arabian-led intervention in Yemen and accused the United States of complicity in Yemen's humanitarian crisis. Warren said: "For over 3 years, the US has helped the Saudi-led coalition bomb Yemen with few constraints. Thousands of civilians died in airstrikes."

In June 2017, Warren voted for a resolution by Rand Paul and Chris Murphy that would block President Trump's $510 million sale of precision-guided munitions to Saudi Arabia that made up a portion of the $110 billion arms sale Trump announced during his visit to Saudi Arabia the previous year.

In March 2018, Warren voted against tabling a resolution spearheaded by Bernie Sanders, Chris Murphy, and Mike Lee that would have required President Trump to withdraw American troops either in or influencing Yemen within the next 30 days unless they were combating Al-Qaeda.

On February 22, 2019, Warren tweeted: "Saudi Arabia brutally murdered a journalist in its own consulate and bombed Yemeni civilians with US-armed warplanes. And if that wasn’t bad enough, it also may have transferred US weapons to violent extremists. It’s time to start holding Saudi Arabia accountable."

In March 2019, Warren was one of nine senators to sign a letter to Salman of Saudi Arabia requesting the release of human rights lawyer Waleed Abu al-Khair and writer Raif Badawi, women's rights activists Loujain al-Hathloul and Samar Badawi, and Dr. Walid Fitaih. The senators wrote, "Not only have reputable international organizations detailed the arbitrary detention of peaceful activists and dissidents without trial for long periods, but the systematic discrimination against women, religious minorities and mistreatment of migrant workers and others has also been well-documented."

==== Syria ====
In August 2013, Warren said that President Obama was "right to seek Congressional approval before taking any military action, and we should engage in a serious debate to determine the appropriate U.S. response to the situation in Syria." Though criticizing the regime of Bashar al-Assad, Warren added that it was "critical that we recognize the complexity of the conflict on the ground and that we consider the potential for unintended consequences of U.S. intervention, no matter how good our intentions."

In September 2014, Warren voted against legislation authorizing Obama to arm and train Syrian rebels, saying in a statement that she did not want Americans "to be dragged into another ground war in the Middle East, and it is time for those nations in the region that are most immediately affected by the rise of ISIS to step up and play a leading role in this fight."

In September 2019, Warren told The Washington Post, “There is no military-only solution in Syria …. I would not restore diplomatic relations with the Syrian regime. I do support pragmatic engagement as part of a coordinated multilateral effort -- to seek the best diplomatic solution possible to end the civil war, address the ongoing humanitarian crisis and prevent any spillover consequences from this conflict, including terrorism.”

In October 2019, Warren criticized Trump's decision to withdraw U.S. troops from Syria, which critics say gave Turkey the green light to launch the military offensive against Syrian Kurds.

==== Yemen ====
In September 2016, Warren was one of 27 senators who voted against withdrawing S.J.Res.39, a joint resolution which proposed the blocking of the sale of arms and equipment worth $1.15 billion to Saudi Arabia during the country's involvement in the Yemeni Civil War. Subsequently, in 2019 she cosponsored S.J.Res.7, which directed the government "to direct the removal of United States Armed Forces from hostilities in the Republic of Yemen that have not been authorized by Congress".

==== Armenia–Azerbaijan War ====
Warren accused Turkey of inciting the conflict between Armenia and Azerbaijan over the disputed region of Nagorno-Karabakh and called for the Trump administration to immediately suspend U.S. military aid to Azerbaijan, sent through Pentagon’s "building partner assistance program." According to critics, the aid could be used in the Nagorno-Karabakh conflict. She co-signed a letter to Secretary of State Mike Pompeo that read: "If Turkey is unwilling to step back from active engagement in the conflict, then the State Department should immediately suspend all sales and transfers of military equipment to Ankara."

== Government reform ==
=== Campaign and election reform ===
Warren supports requiring the use of paper ballots.

On October 15, 2019, Warren introduced her plan for eliminating "big money" in political campaigns. Warren's plan would update campaign finance laws addressing online political advertising and require campaigns to disclose their major donors, bundlers and finance events. Warren also announced that her campaign would not accept contributions of more than $200 from executives at banks, large tech companies, private equity firms and hedge funds, in addition to her previous position of not accepting donations of over $200 from fossil fuel or Big Pharma executives.

In August 2018, Warren proposed the Anti-Corruption and Public Integrity Act, which would institute a lifetime ban on lobbying and a ban on owning individual stock for many federal elected and appointed officials, institute a multi-year lobbying ban for federal employees (including Congressional staffers), require the president and vice-president to place assets that may present a conflict of interest into a blind trust, require the IRS to release eight years of tax returns for presidential and vice presidential candidates and two years for members of Congress while also requiring all to release tax returns while in office, ban direct political donations from lobbyists to Congressional members, "radically" expanding public disclosures of lobbyist activities (including what bills, policies, or government actions they are attempting to influence, any meetings with public officials and any documents they may provide to them), ban US lobbyists from receiving money from foreign entities, and creating a new independent agency to enforce and investigate ethics violations, among other measures.

=== Consumer Financial Protection Bureau ===
Warren was an early advocate for the creation of a new Consumer Financial Protection Bureau (CFPB). The bureau was established by the Dodd–Frank Wall Street Reform and Consumer Protection Act signed into law by President Obama in July 2010. In anticipation of the agency's formal opening, for the first year after the bill's signing, she worked on implementation of the bureau as a special assistant to the president. While liberal groups and consumer advocacy groups pushed for Obama to nominate Warren as the agency's permanent director, she was strongly opposed by financial institutions and by Republican members of Congress who believed Warren would be an overly zealous regulator. Reportedly convinced that Warren could not win Senate confirmation as the bureau's first director, Obama turned to former Ohio Attorney General Richard Cordray and in January 2012, over the objections of Republican Senators, appointed Cordray to the post in a "recess appointment".

In April 2019, Warren was one of six senators to send a letter to Director of the CFPB Kathy Kraninger expressing concern "CFPB leadership has abandoned its supervision and enforcement activities related to federal student loan servicers" and opined that such behavior displayed "a shocking disregard for the financial well-being of our nation's public servants, including teachers, first responders, and members of the military." The senators requested that Kraninger clarify the role of the CFPB in overseeing the Public Service Loan Forgiveness's student loan servicers handling since December 2017 such as examinations made by the CFPB.

=== Glass-Steagall legislation ===
Saying, "despite the progress we've made since 2008, the biggest banks continue to threaten our economy," in July 2015, Senator Warren, along with John McCain (R-Ariz.), Maria Cantwell (D-Wash.), and Angus King (I-Me.) re-introduced the 21st Century Glass-Steagall Act, a modern version of the Banking Act of 1933. The legislation is intended to reduce the risk for the American taxpayer in the financial system and decrease the likelihood of a future financial crises.

=== Presidential conflicts of interest ===
In January 2017, Warren introduced the Presidential Conflicts of Interest Act to the Senate. This followed her announcement in December 2016 to introduce a piece of legislation to address perceived conflicts of interest held by president-elect Donald Trump.

=== TARP oversight ===
On November 14, 2008, Warren was appointed by United States Senate Majority Leader Harry Reid to chair the five-member Congressional Oversight Panel created to oversee the implementation of the Emergency Economic Stabilization Act. The Panel released monthly oversight reports that evaluated the government bailout and related programs. During Warren's tenure, these reports covered foreclosure mitigation, consumer and small business lending, commercial real estate, AIG, bank stress tests, the impact of the Troubled Asset Relief Program (TARP) on the financial markets, government guarantees, the automotive industry, and other topics. (Note: All reports and videos are available online at cop.senate.gov..)

=== Term limits ===
In March 2019, during a speech in Conway, New Hampshire, Warren said, "Here's the problem on term limits on folks in Congress -- it makes them more dependent than ever on the lobbyist. Believe me, if the senators only stay for two terms, the lobbyist will be there a lot longer and they'll know how the game is played."

== Immigration policy ==
Regarding immigration detention, a joint letter dated June 2015 by 33 senators (including Gillibrand, Booker, and Sanders) criticized that as "unacceptable and goes against our most fundamental values".

In January 2017, after President Trump signed executive orders to build a wall along the Mexico–United States border, address undocumented immigrants, and remove federal funding from sanctuary cities, Warren released a statement questioning why the day that the orders were signed was not declared "the Trump Administration's First Anti-Immigrant Day" and said none of the president's actions would make the United States safer. Warren said the executive orders would "tear apart the fabric that makes us strong and united as a country" and "hurt working parents and children who have risked their lives to flee war, violence, and poverty" while wasting the money of taxpayers on what she called "irresponsible and misguided pet political projects".

In September, when asked by a reporter about working with President Trump on immigration reform, Warren said, "If we can get something that is full DACA for our Dreamers, a chance that 800,000 young people won't be thrown out of the only home most of them have ever known, that they can continue to be here, that they can continue to go to school, they can serve in our military, they can be part of our economic growth and prosperity, then that's great."

In November, Warren was one of twenty-four senators to sign a letter to Acting Homeland Security Secretary Elaine Duke requesting the Homeland Security Department authorize thousands of beneficiaries of DACA program to resubmit their applications after being deemed late due to delays by the United States Postal Service.

In December, during a Senate floor speech, Warren said that President Trump had broken a promise "to protect 800,000 Dreamers who were brought to the United States as kids" when his administration ended DACA. Warren stated that the solution to this issue was in the hands of Congress and could be achieved through passing the Dream Act, advocating against Congress adjourning "so that we can celebrate the holidays with our families while nearly 800,000 Dreamers fear being ripped apart from their brothers, their sisters, their mothers, their fathers and deported to a country they barely know". She stated that the Dream Act had enough bipartisan support to pass and questioned what Senate Majority Leader Mitch McConnell was waiting for in not bringing the legislation up for a vote.

In January 2018, Politico named Warren as one of six senators that was part of the "2020 caucus", a group of "potential presidential contenders who similarly voted against reopening the government, presumably mindful that primary voters may judge them harshly for not including a DACA deal in the continuing resolution."

In a February speech on the Senate floor, Warren denounced the Justice Department under the leadership of Attorney General Jeff Sessions: "On Jeff Sessions's watch, the Justice Department has promoted voter suppression. On his watch, the Justice Department has endorsed discrimination. ... And on his watch, the Justice Department has led an all-out bigotry-fueled attack on immigrants and refugees."

In April, Warren was one of five senators to send a letter to acting director of ICE Thomas Homan on standards used by the agency when determining how to detain a pregnant woman, requesting that pregnant women not be held in custody unless under extraordinary standards after reports "that ICE has failed to provide critical medical care to pregnant women in immigration detention — resulting in miscarriages and other negative health outcomes".

In May, Warren cosponsored the Digital Accountability and Transparency Act (DATA) with Jeff Merkley, and Tom Udall. The legislation would require officers with Customs and Border Protection and Immigration and Customs Enforcement to formally maintain records for each occasion that they questioned a passenger and require border and immigration agents to keep detailed logs of information on patrol stops made outside of international security checkpoints.

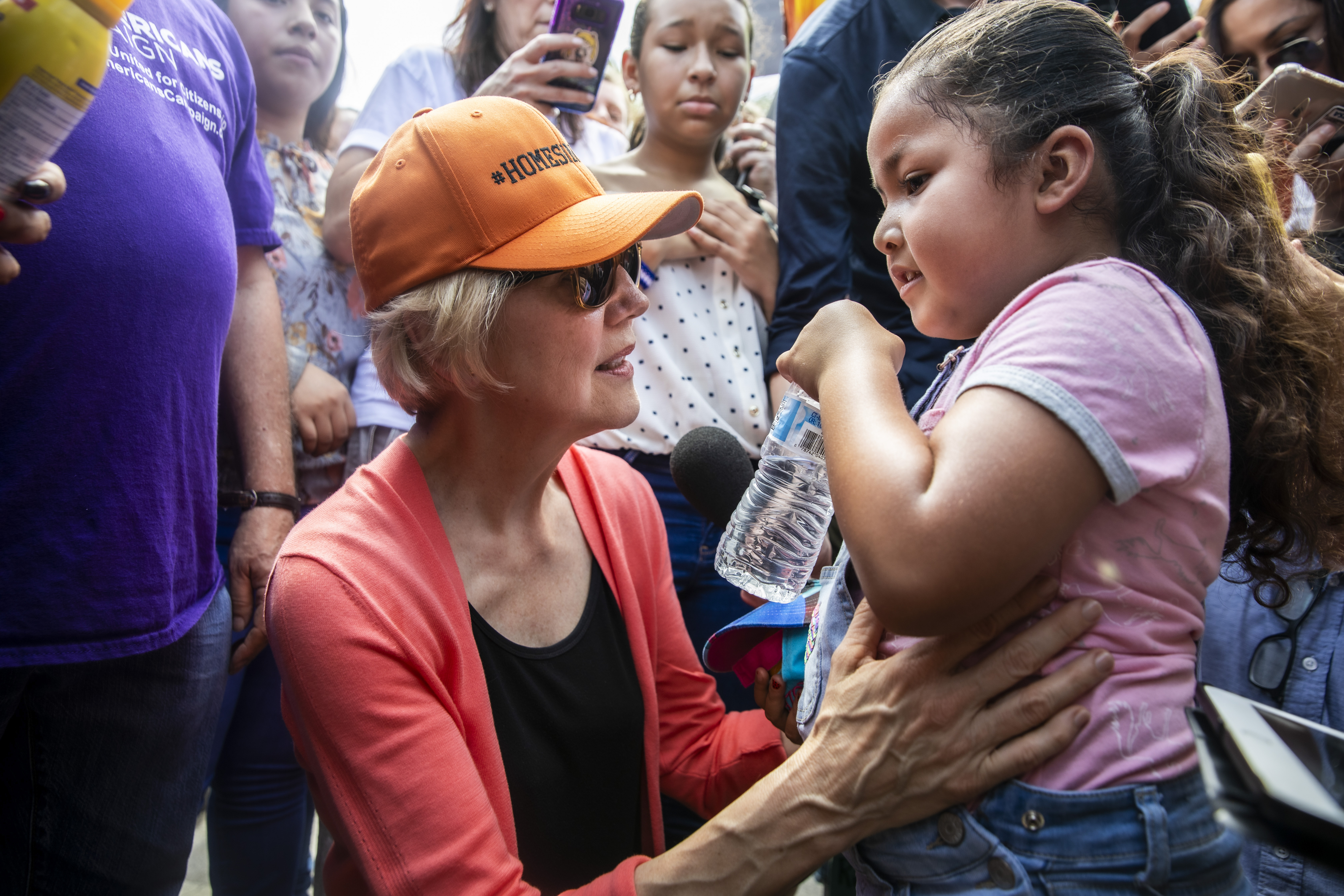
Warren at a demonstration outside of the Homestead Temporary Shelter for Unaccompanied Children on June 26, 2019

In June, during an interview with MSNBC, Warren said that the zero tolerance policy was allowing President Trump to take America "to a dark and ugly place" and said she cared about "whether people push Trump to stop this, that's where we need to be right now." She advocated for Republicans to try urging Trump to apply discretion and end the mass separation of children from adults facing charges for crossing the border. At a rally later that month, Warren advocated for abolishing Immigration and Customs Enforcement "with something that reflects our morality and that works" and that President Trump seemed to believe "the only way to have immigration rule is to rip parents from their family, is to treat rape victims and refugees like terrorists and to put children in cages."

In July, Warren was one of eleven senators to sign a letter requesting the agencies responsible for reuniting families provide weekly updates until every separated child was returned to their parents in the form of a list of separated children, a list of their parents and other adult members of their families in addition to a list connecting the lists of children and parents and a briefing for the lawmakers on the strategies used to reunite families. Later that month, Warren was one of twenty-two senators to sponsor the Stop Shackling and Detaining Pregnant Women Act, which if enacted would prohibit immigration officers from detaining pregnant women in a majority of circumstances and improve conditions of care for individuals in custody.

In August, Warren was one of seventeen senators to sign a letter to United States Secretary of Homeland Security Kirstjen Nielsen demanding that the Trump administration take immediate action in attempting to reunite 539 migrant children with their families, citing each passing day of inaction as intensifying "trauma that this administration has needlessly caused for children and their families seeking humanitarian protection." Later that month, Warren said the United States needed "an immigration system that is effective, that focuses on where problems are" and immigration laws "that focus on people who pose a real threat", adding that separating a mother from her child was not making the country safer.

In January 2019, Warren was one of twenty senators to sponsor the Dreamer Confidentiality Act, a bill imposing a ban on the Department of Homeland Security (DHS) from passing information collected on DACA recipients to Immigration and Customs Enforcement (ICE), Customs and Border Protection (CBP), the Department of Justice, or any other law enforcement agency with exceptions in the case of fraudulent claims, national security issues, or non-immigration related felonies being investigated.

In February 2019, Warren was one of sixteen senators to vote against legislation preventing a partial government shutdown and containing 1.375 billion for barriers along the U.S.-Mexico border that included 55 miles of fencing.

In March 2019, Warren voted to block President Trump's national emergency declaration that would have granted him access to $3.6 billion in military construction funding to build border barriers.

In April 2019, Warren signed a letter led by Catherine Cortez Masto to Immigrations and Customs Enforcement and Customs and Border Enforcement asserting that "the civil detention of an expectant mother for potential immigration offenses is never justified" due to the "absence of compelling evidence that the detention of a pregnant woman is necessary because she is a threat to herself or others, or is a threat to public safety or national security". The senators requested the CBP enact measures that would ensure "timely and appropriate treatment" for pregnant women in custody along with both agencies providing information on how available facilities and doctors are for pregnant immigrants and complete data on the number of those currently in custody.

In April 2019, Warren was one of six Democratic senators to sign a letter to Acting Defense Secretary Patrick M. Shanahan expressing concern over memos by Marine Corps Gen. Robert Neller in which Neller critiqued deployments to the southern border and funding transfers under President Trump's national emergency declaration as having "unacceptable risk to Marine Corps combat readiness and solvency" and noted that other military officials had recently stated that troop deployment did not affect readiness. The senators requested Shanahan explain the inconsistencies and that Shanahan provide both "a staff-level briefing on this matter within seven days" and an explanation on how he would address Neller's concerns.

In April 2019, Warren was one of nineteen senators to sign a letter to top members on the Appropriations Committee Richard Shelby and Patrick Leahy and top members of its Homeland Security subcommittee Shelley Moore Capito and Jon Tester indicating that they could not "support the appropriation of funds that would expand this administration’s unnecessarily cruel immigration enforcement policies, its inhumane immigrant detention systems, or its efforts to build the president’s vanity projects" and urging Congress to "resist efforts to raid critical and effective public safety programs in order to pay for political theatrics" as President Trump's "manufactured emergency" was not justification for "spending taxpayer dollars on an ineffective wall."

In June 2019, Warren and six other Democratic senators were led by Hawaii Senator Brian Schatz in sending letters to the Government Accountability Office along with the suspension and debarment official and inspector general at the US Department of Health and Human Services citing recent reports that showed "significant evidence that some federal contractors and grantees have not provided adequate accommodations for children in line with legal and contractual requirements" and urged officials in the government to determine whether federal contractors and grantees are in violation of contractual obligations or federal regulations and should thus face financial consequences.

In July 2019, Warren and fifteen other Senate Democrats introduced the Protecting Sensitive Locations Act which mandated that ICE agents get approval from a supervisor ahead of engaging in enforcement actions at sensitive locations with the exception of special circumstances and that agents receive annual training in addition to being required to report annually regarding enforcement actions in those locations.

On July 11, 2019, Warren unveiled an immigration plan that called for decriminalizing border crossings in addition to altering both the Immigration and Customs Enforcement (ICE) and Customs and Border Protection (CBP) and implementing a ban on private immigration detention centers. She vowed to prosecute violations of immigrant rights committed under the Trump administration and admitted that while "Trump may have taken the system to its most punitive extreme, his racist policies build on a broken immigration system and an enforcement infrastructure already primed for abuse."

Warren is for abolishing private prisons in the United States.

=== Census ===
In June 2019, Warren was one of twenty-eight senators to sign a letter led by Brian Schatz to United States Secretary of Commerce Wilbur Ross warning that Ross would "further delay and jeopardize the Census Bureau’s ability to conduct a full, fair, and accurate decennial census as required by the U.S. Constitution and the Census Act" by continuing to attempt adding the citizenship question to 2020 census materials. The senators urged Ross to "allow the Census Bureau to proceed with preparation for a 2020 census without a citizenship question on the questionnaire."

=== DREAM Act ===
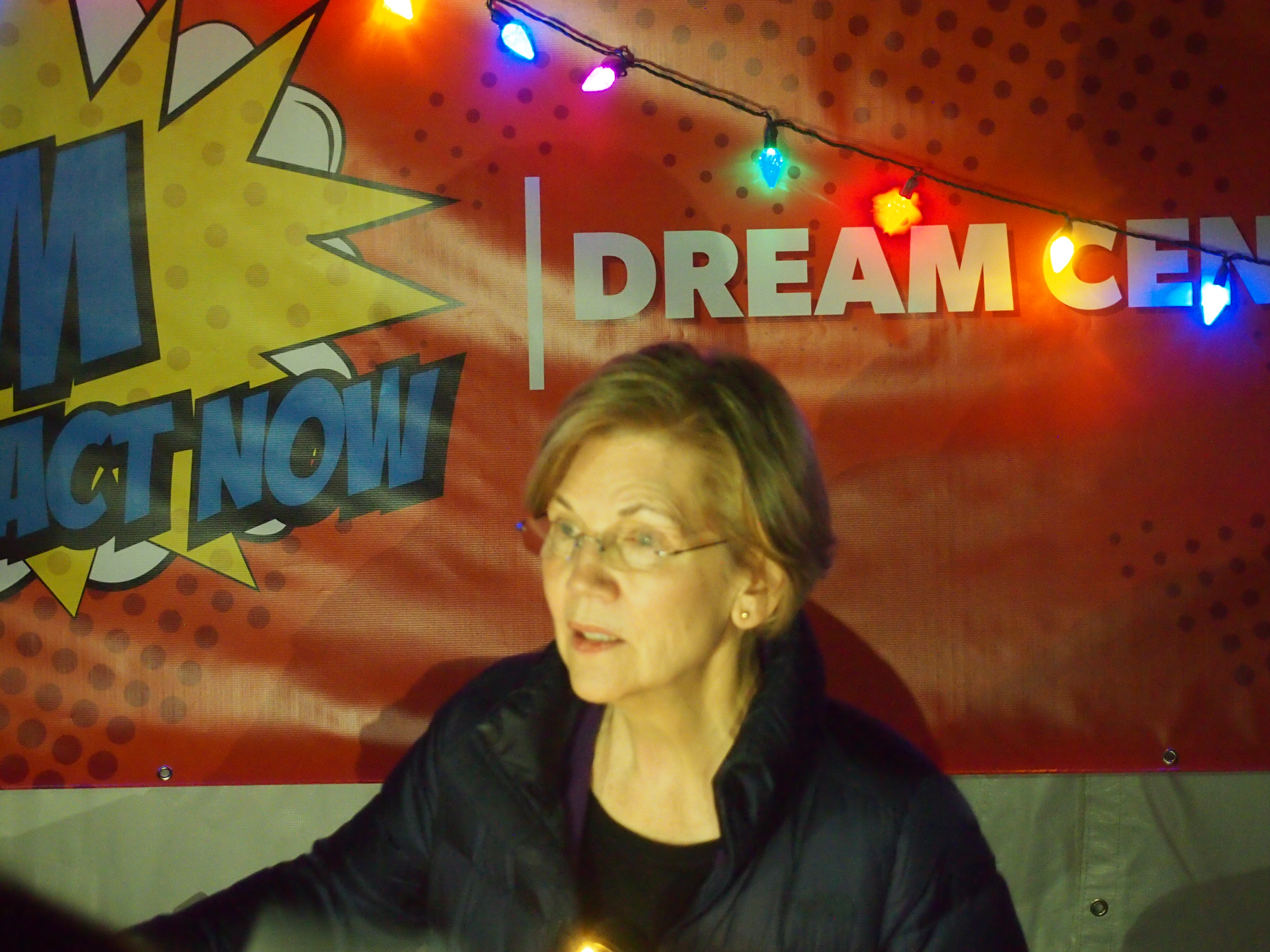
Warren at a December 2017 event in support of the DREAM Act

Warren supports the passage of the DREAM Act and comprehensive immigration reform.

== Health care ==
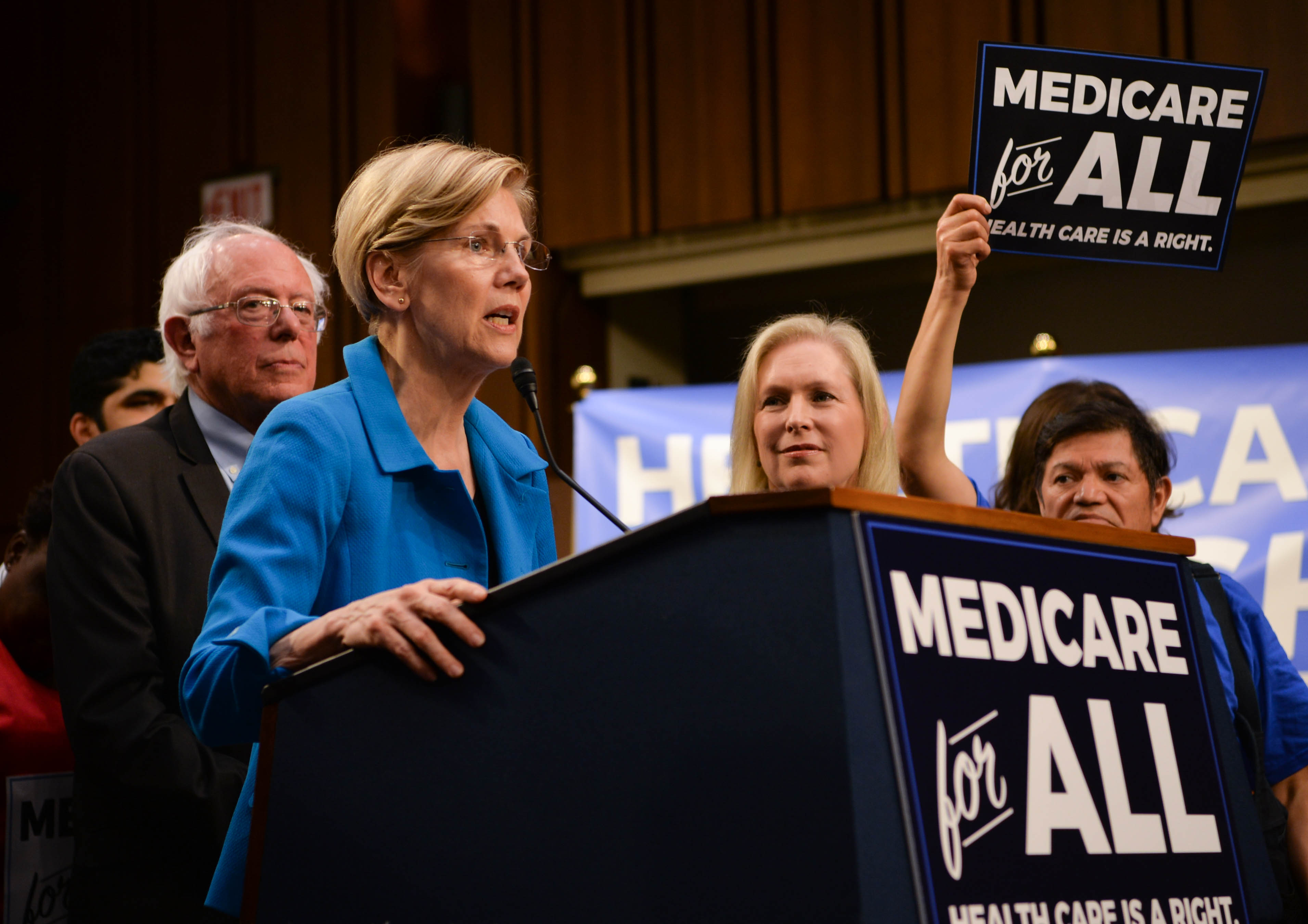
Warren speaks alongside Senators Bernie Sanders and Kirsten Gillibrand in favor of single-payer healthcare in 2017.

In the 2008 book, Health at Risk, in the chapter Get Sick, Go Broke, Warren and Deborah Thorne wrote that "We approach the health care debates from a single perspective: maintaining the financial stability of families confronting illness or injury. The most obvious solution would be universal single-payer health care." However, Warren and Thorne also note that "If universal, single-payer health insurance is politically unacceptable, then another option would be to guarantee all Americans access to affordable and adequate health insurance that cannot be terminated or made more costly if a family member is ill or injured." Warren supported the Affordable Care Act and has opposed Republican efforts to repeal it however in June 2017, she said that Democratic Party should start running on a new national single-payer plan: "President Obama tried to move us forward with health-care coverage by using a conservative model that came from one of the conservative think tanks that had been advanced by a Republican governor in Massachusetts. Now it's time for the next step. And the next step is single payer." She has spoken against the 2.3 percent tax on medical devices introduced by the ACA.

In December 2016, Warren was one of five senators to vote against the Obama administration-supported 21st Century Cures Act, legislation increasing funding for disease research while addressing flaws in the American mental health systems and altering drugs and medical devices' regulatory system."

In April 2017, Warren was one of five Democratic senators to sign a letter to President Trump that warned failure "to take immediate action to oppose the lawsuit or direct House Republicans to forgo this effort will increase instability in the insurance market, as insurers may choose not to participate in the marketplace in 2018" and that they remained concerned that his administration "has still not provided certainty to insurers and consumers that you will protect the cost-sharing subsidies provided under the law."

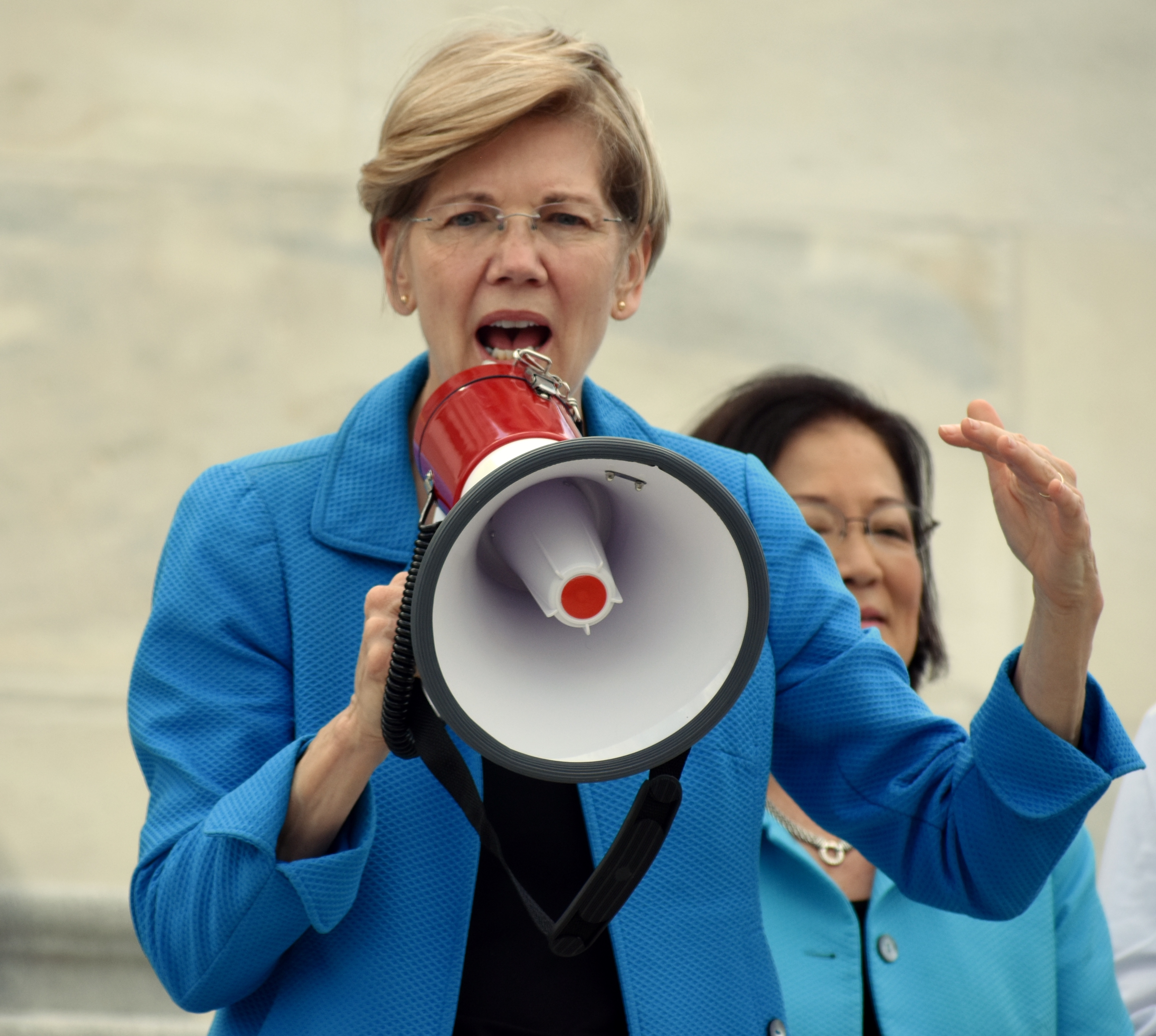
Warren speaks alongside Senator Mazie Hirono at a protest at the United States Capitol against the American Health Care Act of 2017.

In September 2017, Warren said she would support Bernie Sanders' single-payer plan that would expand Medicare to all Americans. Warren said that the plan would guarantee medical care for all at the lowest prices. In a message to her supporters she said, "Health care is a basic human right and it's time to fight for it."

In January 2018, during a speech to a conference hosted by Families USA, Warren opined that it was time for Democrats to play "offense" on the issue of health care. She cited alternatives to a single payer plan including creating a public health insurance option in the Affordable Care Act and authorizing individuals to buy into Medicaid. Warren stated that "giant insurance companies have pretty much run the show" for too long and that progress needed to be made in holding American insurance companies accountable.

In December 2018, Warren was one of forty-two senators to sign a letter to Trump administration officials Alex Azar, Seema Verma, and Steve Mnuchin arguing that the administration was improperly using Section 1332 of the Affordable Care Act to authorize states to "increase health care costs for millions of consumers while weakening protections for individuals with pre-existing conditions." The senators requested the administration withdraw the policy and "re-engage with stakeholders, states, and Congress."

In December 2018, Warren introduced legislation that would vest a to-be established governmental agency ("Office of Drug Manufacturing", to operate within the HHS) with the authority to manufacture generic forms of pharmaceuticals for which the US government has licensed a patent whenever there is "little or no competition, critical shortages, or exorbitant prices that restrict patient access."

In January 2019, during the 2018–19 United States federal government shutdown, Warren was one of thirty-four senators to sign a letter to Commissioner of Food and Drugs Scott Gottlieb recognizing the efforts of the FDA to address the effect of the government shutdown on the public health and employees while remaining alarmed "that the continued shutdown will result in increasingly harmful effects on the agency’s employees and the safety and security of the nation’s food and medical products."

In February 2019, Warren was one of twenty-three Democratic senators to introduce the State Public Option Act, a bill that would authorize states to form a Medicaid buy-in program for all residents and thereby grant all denizens of the state the ability to buy into a state-driven Medicaid health insurance plan if they wished. Brian Schatz, a bill cosponsor, said the legislation would "unlock each state’s Medicaid program to anyone who wants it, giving people a high-quality, low-cost public health insurance option" and that its goal was "to make sure that every single American has comprehensive health care coverage."

In August 2019, Warren was one of nineteen senators to sign a letter to United States Secretary of the Treasury Steve Mnuchin and United States Secretary of Health and Human Services Alex Azar requesting data from the Trump administration in order to aid in the comprehension of states and Congress on potential consequences in the event that the Texas v. United States Affordable Care Act (ACA) lawsuit prevailed in courts, citing that an overhaul of the present health care system would form "an enormous hole in the pocketbooks of the people we serve as well as wreck state budgets". That same month, Warren, three other Senate Democrats, and Bernie Sanders signed a letter to Acting FDA Commissioner Dr. Ned Sharpless in response to Novartis falsifying data as part of an attempt to gain the FDA's approval for its new gene therapy Zolgensma, writing that it was "unconscionable that a drug company would provide manipulated data to federal regulators in order to rush its product to market, reap federal perks, and charge the highest amount in American history for its medication."

Despite being a strong advocate of Medicare for All during her 2020 presidential campaign, Senator Warren moderated her position in May, stating that, rather than an immediate single-payer health insurance program being implemented, ObamaCare should be expanded to include a Public Option. The comment came at a time when Warren was under speculation to become Joe Biden's running mate in the upcoming presidential election. Since Biden was also against Medicare for All, some believed Warren changed her position to increase the chances of becoming Biden's running mate.

In 2024, Senator Elizabeth Warren has urged the Federal Trade Commission to scrutinize Novo Nordisk’s parent foundation’s $16.5 billion acquisition of Catalent, citing concerns about potential unfair market advantages in the obesity and diabetes drug sector. In her October 10 letter, Warren highlighted Catalent’s role in filling and packaging injection pens for both Novo Nordisk and its competitor, Eli Lilly, which considers Catalent crucial for manufacturing its diabetes and obesity medications.

== National security ==
=== Disaster relief ===
In October 2017, following Hurricane Maria and Hurricane Irma, Warren signed a letter to Acting Secretary of Homeland Security Elaine Duke urging her "to provide all necessary resources to confirm that storm-related deaths are being counted correctly" given that President Trump seemed "to be using the number of fatalities to determine the quality of the disaster response".

In April 2018, Warren was one of five Democratic senators to sign a letter to FEMA administrator Brock Long calling on FEMA to enter an agreement with the United States Department of Housing and Urban Development that would "stand up the Disaster Housing Assistance Program and address the medium- and longer-term housing needs" of evacuees of Puerto Rico in the aftermath of Hurricane Maria. The senators asserted that "FEMA's refusal to use the tools at its disposal, including DHAP, to help these survivors is puzzling -- and profoundly troubling" and that hundreds of hurricane survivors were susceptible to being left homeless in the event that FEMA and HUD continued to not work together.

In August 2018, Warren was one of eight senators to sign a letter to the Federal Emergency Management Agency charging the agency with not assisting displaced homeowners in Puerto Rico in the aftermath of Hurricane Maria under the Individuals and Households (IHP) program by "alarming rates."

In January 2019, during a visit to Puerto Rico, Warren called for the resignation of FEMA administrator Long and spoke of Puerto Rico's continued suffering, adding, "We will not allow anyone to sabotage your recovery, not even the president of the United States." Warren also "called for an independent, 9/11-style commission to understand how and why Washington's response to these hurricanes was so inadequate—and to make sure nothing like this ever, ever happens again." Long resigned the following month.

In March 2019, Warren was one of eleven senators to sign a letter to congressional leaders urging them to "bring legislation providing disaster supplemental appropriations to your respective floors for consideration immediately" after noting that the previous year had seen 124 federal disaster declarations approved for states, territories, and tribal nations across the US.

=== Ebola ===
In October 2014, Warren reflected that the US government had previously researched Ebola but had shelved its efforts after "spending cutbacks and all the pressure on the National Institute of Health" and that now they were "all very worried, instead of spending the money in advance to do more of the research to avoid this kind of problem." Warren stated the importance of using the most accurate scientific developments to address the threat of Ebola: "Ebola is dangerous and our No. 1 responsibility is to keep our people safe. But we want to be very careful that we are following the recommendations of the scientific community. We want to use best science here. That’s how we’ll keep ourselves safe. So for me, part of this is the reminder it is powerfully important to make long-term investments, particularly in medical research."

=== Military spending ===
Warren has worked to protect military spending in her home state of Massachusetts: during her first year in the Senate she and other members of the state's congressional delegation successfully opposed $128 million cuts to the PM WIN-T battlefield communications program which had been proposed by the Pentagon in order to add funding for the War in Afghanistan, an effort assisted by a lobbying campaign led by General Dynamics. In 2013 she also lobbied Secretary of Defense Chuck Hagel regarding maintaining restrictions in the supply of Army Manpack radios, arguing against increasing the number of vendors beyond the initial two, General Dynamics and Rockwell Collins, despite the radios being poorly rated in combat testing. She voted for the 2018 National Defense Authorization Act, but was one of ten senators who voted against the 2019 NDAA.

In May 2019, Warren and Rep. Jackie Speier introduced legislation to limit corporate influence on government defense policy. The proposal would implement a four-year ban on major defense contractors from hiring senior officials and officials involved in managing those corporations' contracts at the Department of Defense, and would also require DoD officials to recuse themselves from matters affecting companies that they had worked for during the previous four years. It would also strengthen regulations on US government officials working for foreign governments, ban former intelligence officers from working for foreign governments, and make dealings between the government and contractors more transparent.

=== Nuclear weapons ===
Shortly after announcing her 2020 presidential campaign, Warren and Rep. Adam Smith introduced a bill which would commit the United States to a no first use policy regarding nuclear weapons.

=== Surveillance ===
In June 2013, following reports that the National Security Agency (NSA) had used statutes under the Patriot Act to obtain the phone records and emails of United States denizens, Warren was one of twenty-six senators to sign a letter espousing the view that the records could "reveal personal relationships, family medical issues, political and religious affiliations, and a variety of other private personal information" and other bulk information associated with the USA Patriot Act "could clearly have a significant impact on Americans’ privacy and liberties as well."

=== Prosecution of Julian Assange ===
In response to a New York Times question posed to all presidential primary candidates, “Would your administration continue the Espionage Act part of the case against Assange?”, Warren responded: "Whatever one’s opinions of Julian Assange, these charges under the Espionage Act set a precedent that could be used to target journalists.” She told The Washington Times, “Assange is a bad actor who has harmed U.S. national security — and he should be held accountable. Trump should not be using this case as a pretext to wage war on the First Amendment and go after the free press who hold the powerful accountable everyday.”

== Social issues ==
=== Abortion ===
Warren supports abortion rights and opposes any Supreme Court nominees who "oppose legal abortion".

Following the June 24, 2022 ruling in which the Supreme Court overturned the Roe v. Wade position on a woman's choice to end a pregnancy, Warren and Tina Smith spoke out in an op-ed in The New York Times requesting that President Biden unblock "critical resources and authority that states and the federal government can use to meet the surge in demand for reproductive health services."

=== Civil rights ===
==== LGBT rights ====
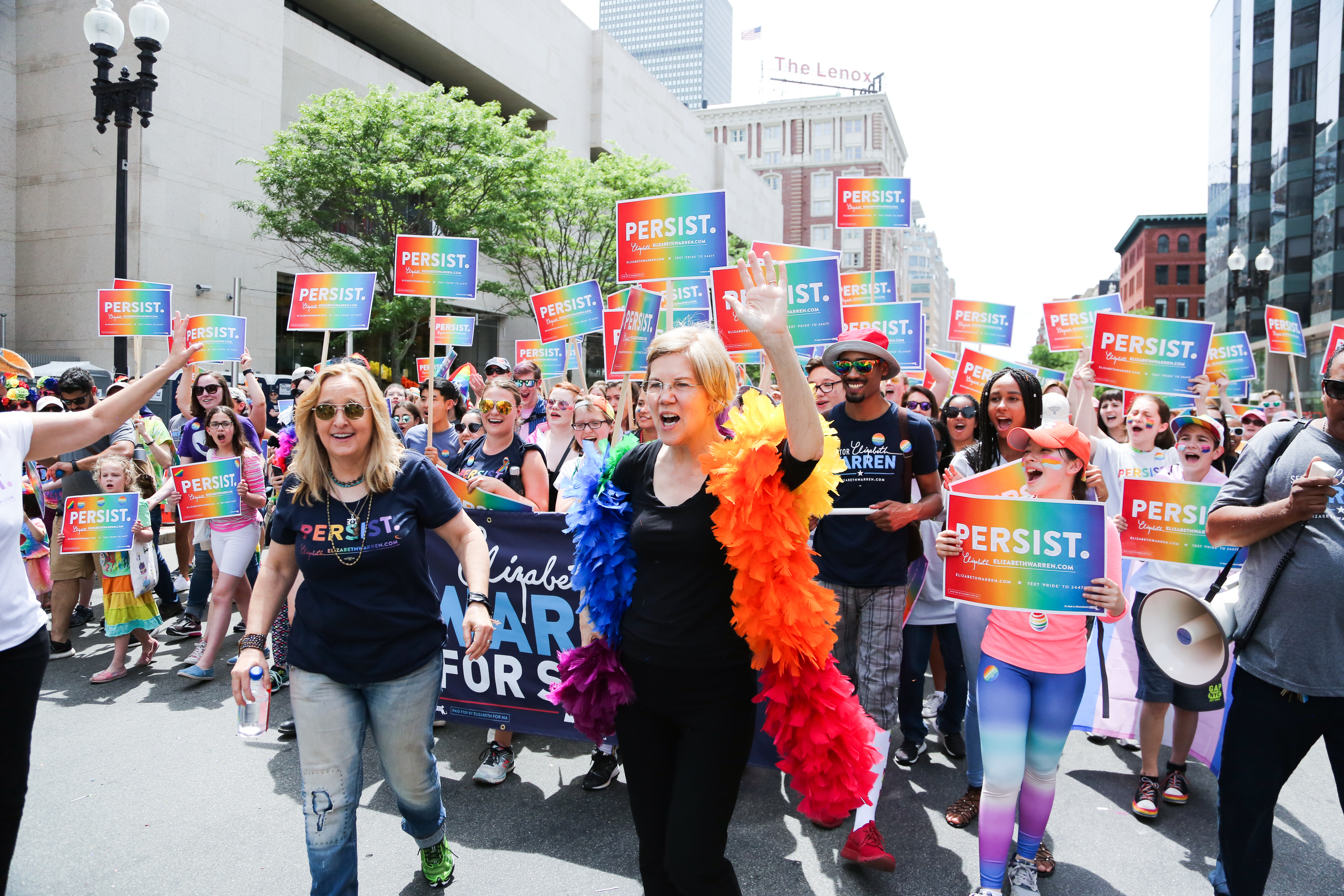
Warren marching in the 2018 Boston Pride Parade

Warren supports same-sex marriage and passing the Employment Non-Discrimination Act (ENDA).

In September 2014, Warren was one of 69 members of the US House and Senate to sign a letter to then-FDA commissioner Sylvia Burwell requesting that the FDA revise its policy banning donation of corneas and other tissues by men who have had sex with another man in the preceding 5 years.

In July 2015, Warren and fellow senator Tammy Baldwin joined eighty-one congressional colleagues in signing a letter to the Food and Drug Administration requesting it lift a ban on gay and bisexual males donating blood and implement a one-year deferral on the grounds that the ban served "to perpetuate the stereotype that all men who have sex with men pose a risk to the health of others."

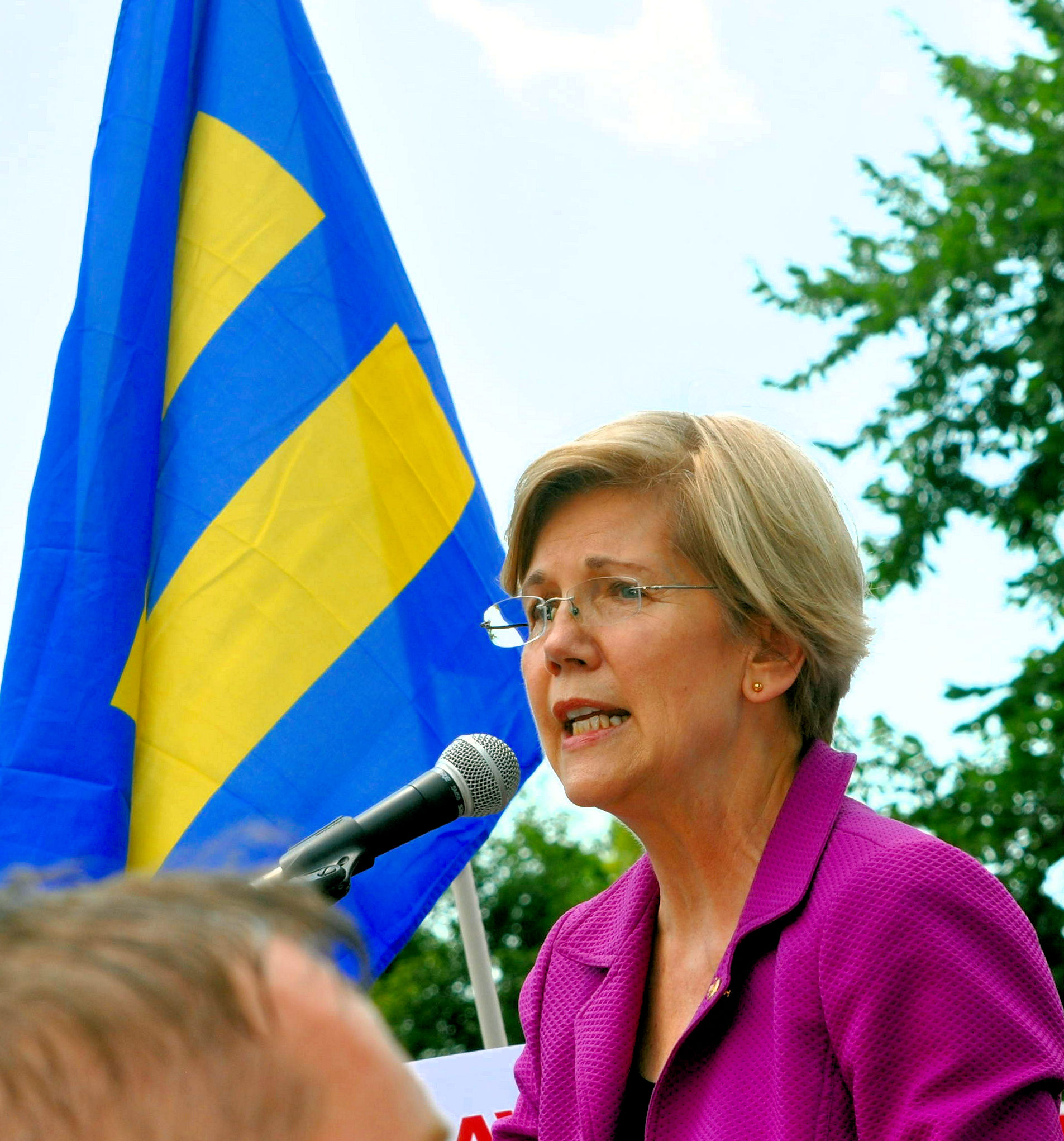
Warren speaks at a June 2017 pride rally at the United States Capitol.

In May 2017, Warren was one of forty-six senators to introduce the Equality Act of 2017, described by Representative David Cicilline as ensuring "that every LGBT person can live their lives free from the fear of discrimination. Above all, it’s about honoring the values that have guided our nation since its founding. It’s critical that Congress pass the Equality Act into law."

In June 2019, Warren was one of eighteen senators to sign a letter to United States Secretary of State Mike Pompeo requesting an explanation of a decision by the State Department to not issue an official statement that year commemorating Pride Month nor issue the annual cable outlining activities for embassies commemorating Pride Month. They also questioned why the LGBTI special envoy position had remained vacant and asserted that "preventing the official flying of rainbow flags and limiting public messages celebrating Pride Month signals to the international community that the United States is abandoning the advancement of LGBTI rights as a foreign policy priority."

==== Women's rights ====
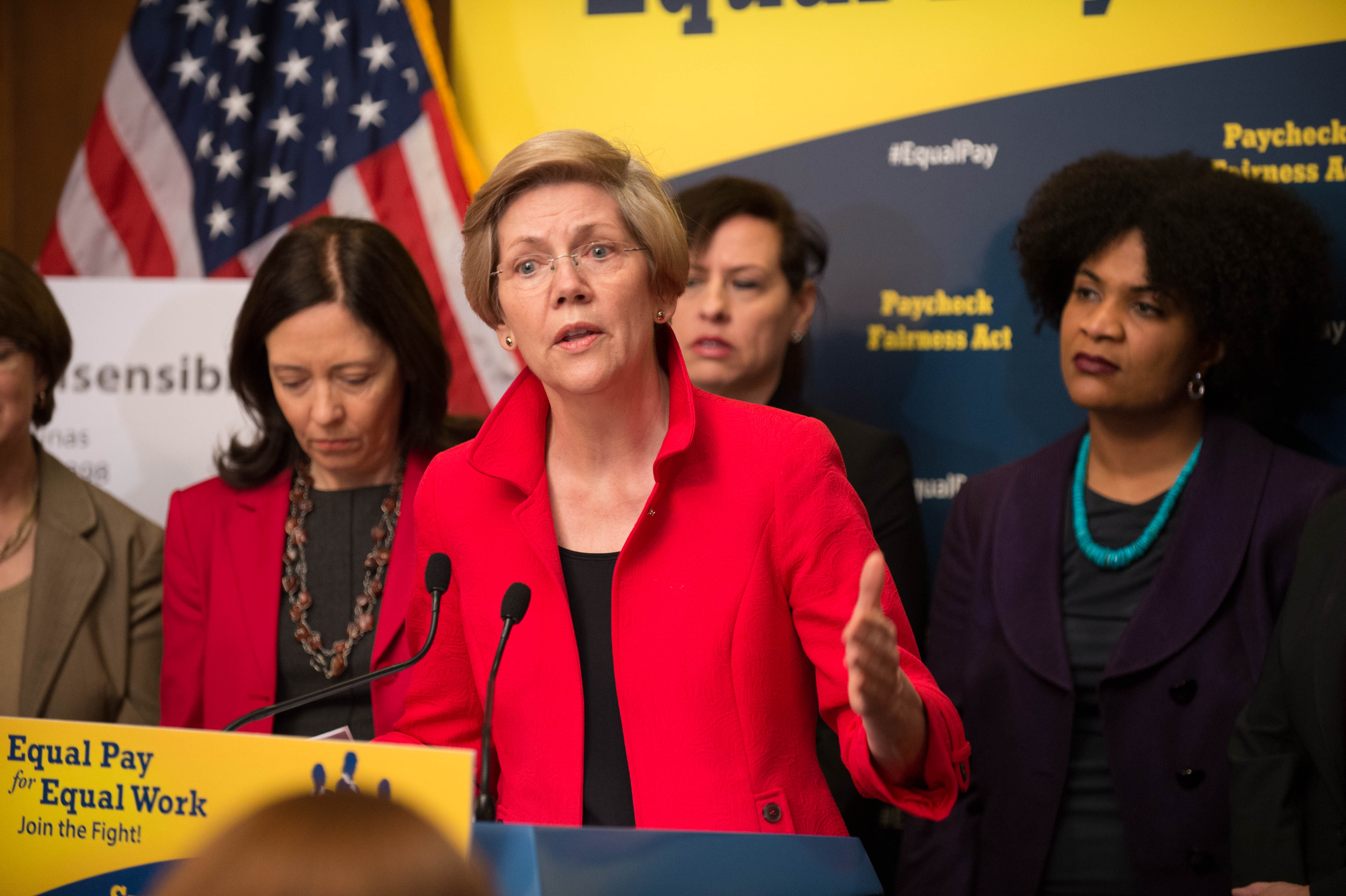
Warren speaking in support of the passage of the Paycheck Fairness Act in 2014

Warren is a supporter of the Equal Rights Amendment.

Warren supports closing the gender pay gap in the United States. Warren has advocated the passage of the Paycheck Fairness Act, which would address this issue. In November 2016, Warren spoke at the New England Women's Policy Conference held at the University of Massachusetts Boston on expanding economic opportunities and equality for women and women of color. As a presidential candidate, Warren released a plan focusing on also closing the wage gap for women of color.

Warren was a co-sponsor in 2017 of Savanna's Act, which would create a federal response to violence against Indigenous women, particularly addressing missing and murdered Indigenous women.

In April 2019, Warren joined fellow senator Patty Murray and representatives Jan Schakowsky and Lauren Underwood to announce the introduction of the Women's Retirement Protection Act of 2019, which would address the retirement gender gap.

==== Workplace harassment ====
In April 2019, Warren signed onto the Be HEARD Act, legislation intended to abolish the tipped minimum wage along with ending mandatory arbitration and pre-employment nondisclosure agreements. The bill also gave workers additional time to report harassment and was said by cosponsor Patty Murray to come at a time when too many workers are "still silenced by mandatory disclosure agreements that prevent them from discussing sexual harassment and longstanding practices like the tipped wages that keep workers in certain industries especially vulnerable."

=== Children and families ===
==== Welfare for seniors ====
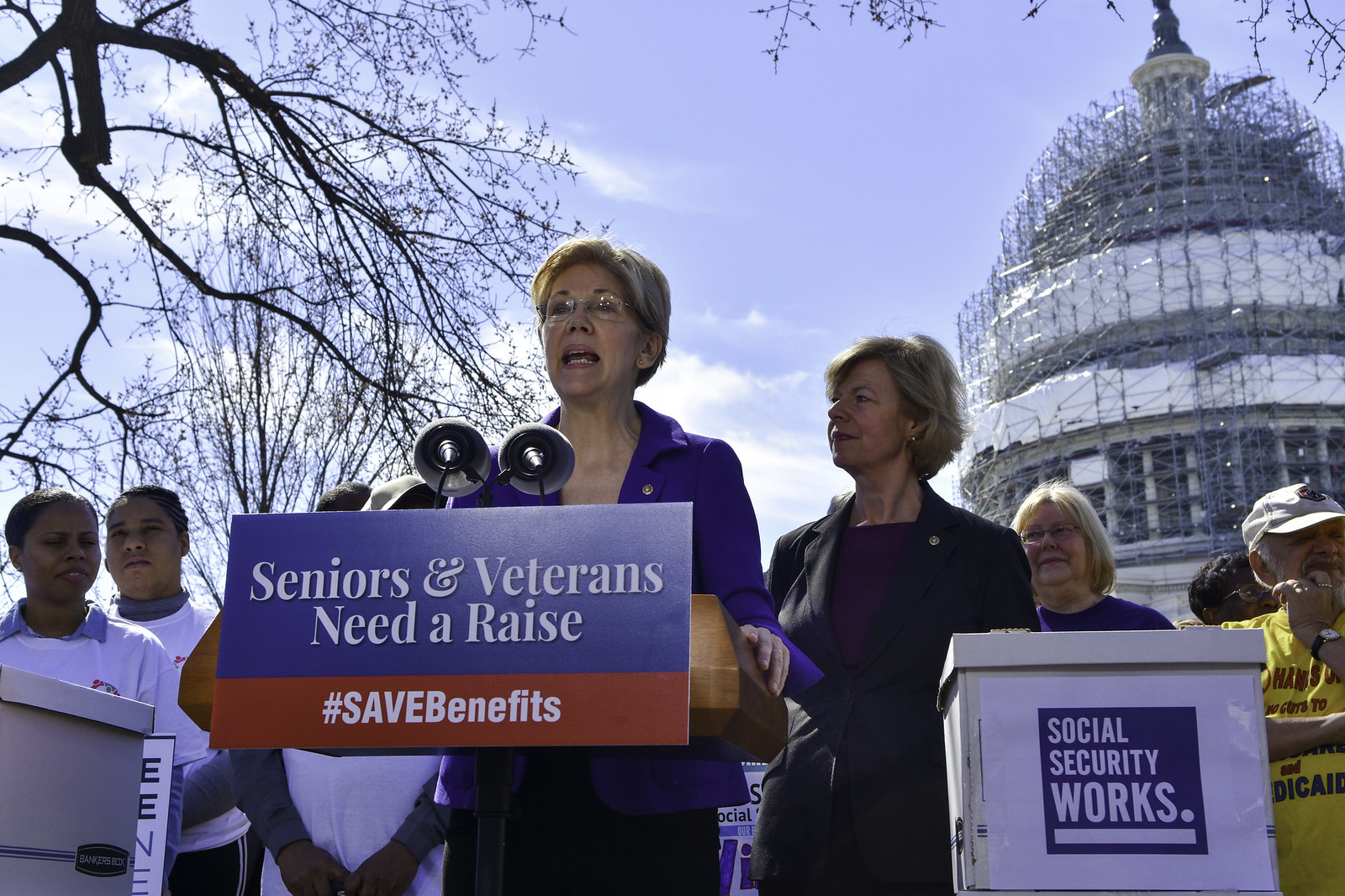
Elizabeth Warren speaking alongside Senator Tammy Baldwin at a March 2016 event supporting the SAVE Benefits Act

In November 2015 Warren introduced, as the chief sponsor, the Seniors And Veterans Emergency Benefits Act, also known as the SAVE Benefits Act, which would direct the Department of the Treasury to disburse a payment equal to 3.9% of the average amount of annual benefits to certain individuals (except prisoners, fugitive felons, or aliens) who are entitled to a specific benefit under title II (Old Age, Survivors and Disability Insurance) of the Social Security Act, an annuity under the Railroad Retirement Act of 1974, a veterans benefit, or are eligible for a cash benefit under SSA title XVI (Supplemental Security Income), including a special benefit for individuals who perform substantial gainful activity despite severe medical impairment.

==== Child abuse ====
Warren introduced the AI/AN CAPTA to tackle the issue of child abuse in Indigenous American communities.

==== Child care ====
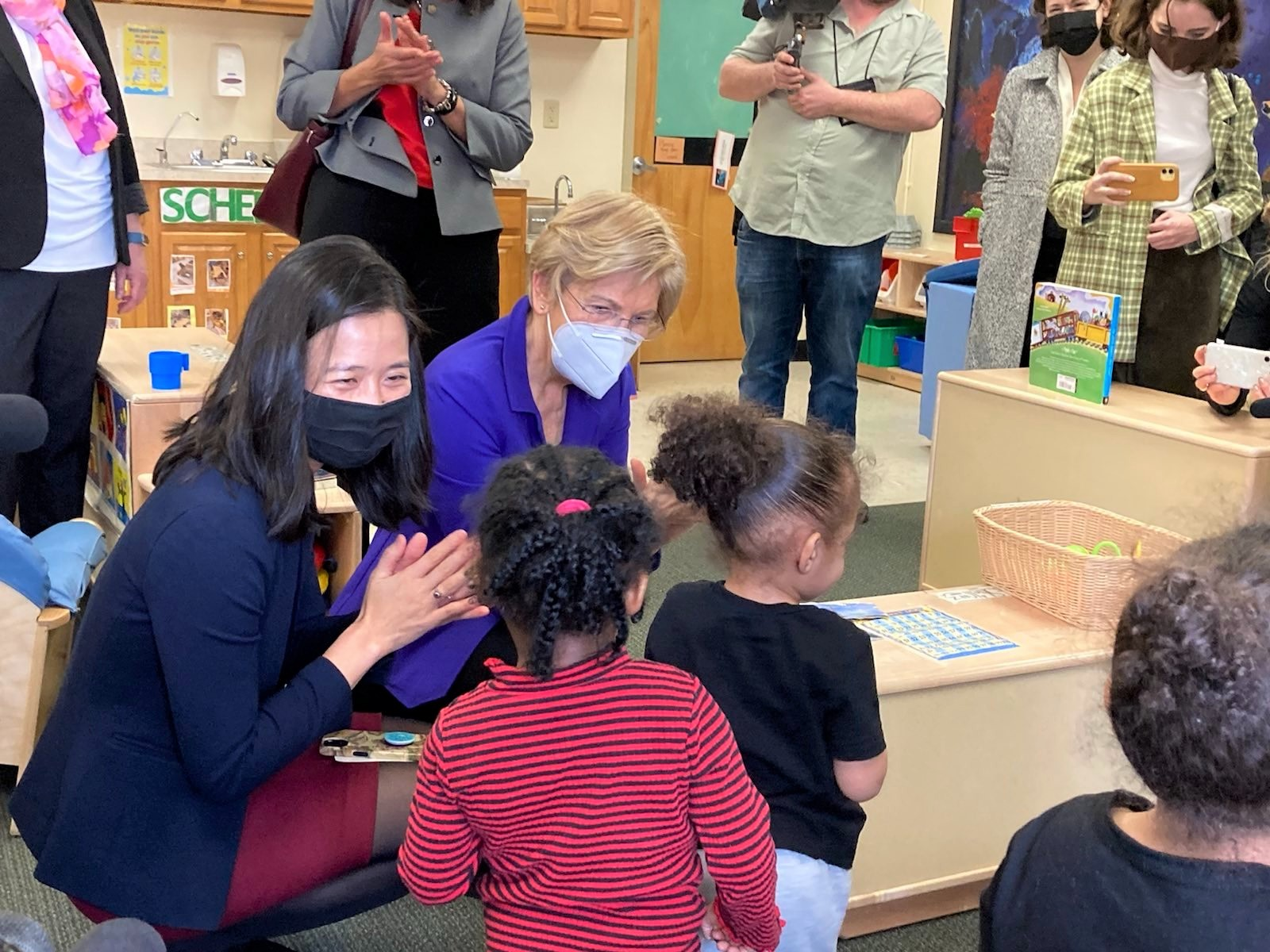
Warren and Boston Mayor Michelle Wu visit an Early Head Start program in Boston in 2022.

In 2019, Warren and 34 other senators introduced the Child Care for Working Families Act, a bill that created 770,000 new child care jobs and that ensured families under 75 percent of the state median income did not pay for child care with higher earning families having to pay "their fair share for care on a sliding scale, regardless of the number of children they have." The legislation also supported universal access to high-quality preschool programs for all 3 and 4-year-olds and gave the child care workforce a changed compensation and training to aid both teachers and caregivers.

In February 2019, Warren unveiled a universal child care plan. The following year, Warren centered her 2020 Democratic National Convention speech on arguing the importance of passing of universal child care legislation. In her speech, Warren remarked,

We build infrastructure like roads, bridges and communications systems so that people can work...It's time to recognize that childcare is part of the basic infrastructure of this nation—it's infrastructure for families.

==== Children's programming ====
In 2019, following the announcement by the Federal Communications Commission of rules changes to children's programming through modifying the Children's Television Act of 1990, Warren and eight other Democratic senators signed a letter to FCC Chairman Ajit Pai that expressed concern that the proposed changes "would limit the reach of educational content available to children and have a particular damaging effect on youth in low-income and minority communities" and asserted that the new rules would see a reduction in access to valuable educational content through over-the-air services.

=== Crime ===
==== Capital punishment ====
Warren is against capital punishment (also known as the "death penalty") and supports abolishing it in the United States.

==== Criminal justice reform ====
In February 2013, Warren was one of twenty-four senators to sign a letter asserting that Sikh, Hindu and Arab Americans were often targets of violence because they were mistaken for being radical Muslims and citing the importance of the federal government to "begin tracking information about anti-Sikh, anti-Hindu and anti-Arab hate crimes as soon as possible so that law enforcement can more effectively respond to this threat."

In February 2016, as the Obama administration and Senate Democrats pushed for bipartisan criminal justice reform legislation, Warren stated that Republicans were "threatening to block a reform unless Congress includes a so-called mens rea amendment to make it much harder for the government to prosecute hundreds of corporate crimes" and said this was shameful "because we're already way too easy on corporate law breakers."

In July 2017, along with Cory Booker, Dick Durbin, and Kamala Harris, Warren was one of four senators to introduce the Dignity for Incarcerated Women Act, legislation implementing a ban on the shackling of pregnant women and mandating the Bureau of Prisons to form superior visitation policies for parents along with providing parenting classes and offering health products such as tampons and pads for free. The bill also restricted prison employees from entering restrooms of the opposite sex with the exception of pressing circumstances. In 2019, Warren reintroduced the bill with Booker and Representatives Pramila Jayapal and Karen Bass, saying in a statement, "For too long, our criminal justice system has treated incarcerated women as an afterthought. The Dignity for Incarcerated Women Act starts to change our country's approach to helping women in prison by ensuring that they are treated with dignity and equipping them with the tools, resources, and services they need to successfully return to their families and communities."

In August 2018, during an appearance at a Dillard University forum, Warren stated, "Let's just start with the hard truth about our criminal justice system. It's racist ... I mean all the way. I mean front to back." She furthered that African-Americans were disproportionately jailed for drug-related crimes while public defenders were burdened by a lack of resources and prisoners were dehumanized after their convictions.

Warren supports abolishing mandatory minimum sentencing.

In December 2018, Warren voted for the First Step Act, legislation aimed at reducing recidivism rates among federal prisoners through expanding job training and other programs in addition to forming an expansion of early-release programs and modifications on sentencing laws such as mandatory minimum sentences for nonviolent drug offenders, "to more equitably punish drug offenders."

In March 2019, Warren, Cory Booker, and Ted Deutch signed a letter to the head of Prisoner Transportation Services of America that noted the organization had a moral obligation to avoid individuals being harmed in custody and cited that at least "5 individuals have died while in PTS custody since 2012". The members of Congress requested information on all deaths involving their inmates as well as allegations of sexual assault against their employees and expressed that a "desire to slash costs in order to increase profit margins may create perverse incentives for your company to jeopardize the health and safety of your employees and the prisoners in your care."

=== Gun laws ===
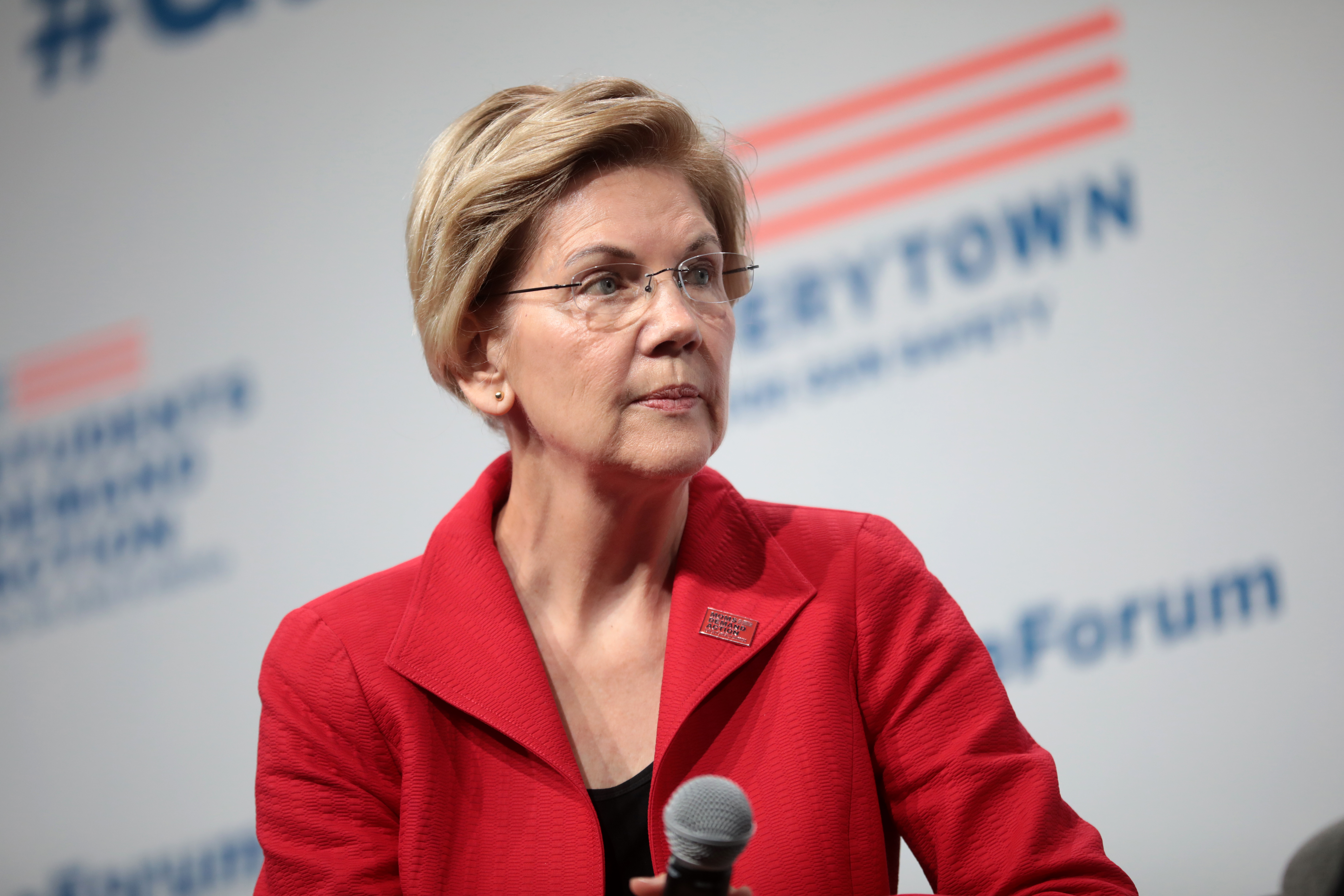
Warren at an August 2019 forum hosted by Everytown for Gun Safety

Warren supports reinstating an extended magazine long rifle weapons ban as well as more rigorous background screenings, including for people who purchase firearms at gun shows, and she opposes limits on the sharing of firearms trace information. On April 17, 2013, she voted to expand background checks for gun purchases.

In January 2016, Warren was one of eighteen senators to sign a letter to Thad Cochran and Barbara Mikulski requesting that the Labor, Health and Education subcommittee hold a hearing on whether to allow the Centers for Disease Control and Prevention (CDC) to fund a study of gun violence and "the annual appropriations rider that some have interpreted as preventing it" with taxpayer dollars. The senators noted their support for taking steps "to fund gun-violence research, because only the United States government is in a position to establish an integrated public-health research agenda to understand the causes of gun violence and identify the most effective strategies for prevention."

Following the Las Vegas shooting in October 2017, Warren was one of twenty-four senators to sign a letter to National Institutes of Health Director Dr. Francis Collins espousing the view that it was critical the NIH "dedicate a portion of its resources to the public health consequences of gun violence" at a time when 93 Americans die per day from gun-related fatalities and noted that the Dickey Amendment did not prohibit objective, scientific inquiries into shooting death prevention.

In November 2017, Warren was a cosponsor of the Military Domestic Violence Reporting Enhancement Act, a bill that would form a charge of Domestic Violence under the Uniform Code of Military Justice (UCMJ) and stipulate that convictions would have to be reported to federal databases with the authority to keep abusers from purchasing firearms within three days in an attempt to close a loophole in the Uniform Code of Military Justice (UCMJ) through which convicted abusers retained the ability to purchase firearms.

In February 2018, after the Stoneman Douglas High School shooting, Warren wrote letters to nine gun company shareholders saying they had "reaped significant benefits from [their] investment in gun manufacturers" while doing "little to reduce the violence and murders caused by their products" and encouraging them to "take action to ensure that the gun companies in which [they] invest are taking steps to reduce gun violence." In March, Warren was one of ten senators to sign a letter to Chairman of the United States Senate Committee on Health, Education, Labor and Pensions Lamar Alexander and ranking Democrat Patty Murray requesting they schedule a hearing on the causes and remedies of mass shootings in the wake of the shooting.

In January 2019, Warren was one of forty senators to introduce the Background Check Expansion Act, a bill that would require background checks for either the sale or transfer of all firearms including all unlicensed sellers. Exceptions to the bill's background check requirement included transfers between members of law enforcement, loaning firearms for either hunting or sporting events on a temporary basis, providing firearms as gifts to members of one's immediate family, firearms being transferred as part of an inheritance, or giving a firearm to another person temporarily for immediate self-defense.

In February 2019, Warren was one of thirty-eight senators to sign a letter to Senate Judiciary Committee Chairman Lindsey Graham calling on him to "hold a hearing" on universal background checks and noted Graham's statement in the press that he "intended to have the Committee work on ‘red flag’ legislation and potentially also background checks, both actions" the senators indicated their support for.

=== Drug policy ===
In July 2015, Warren was one of eight senators to sign a letter to U.S. Chamber of Commerce President Tom J. Donohue requesting the chamber stop lobbying against anti-smoking regulations on the grounds that "its international clout to fight so ardently against regulations of dangerous tobacco products is contrary to United States foreign policy and global health goals."

In December 2016, Warren was one of seventeen senators to sign a letter to President-elect Trump advocating for him to fulfill a campaign pledge to bring down the cost of prescription drugs, stating their willingness "to advance measures to achieve this goal", and calling on Trump "to partner with Republicans and Democrats alike to take meaningful steps to address the high cost of prescription drugs through bold administrative and legislative actions."

In February 2017, Warren and thirty other senators signed a letter to Kaléo Pharmaceuticals in response to the opioid-overdose-reversing device Evzio rising in price from $690 in 2014 to $4,500 and requested the company answer what the detailed price structure for Evzio was, the number of devices Kaléo Pharmaceuticals set aside for donation, and the totality of federal reimbursements Evzio received in the previous year.

In October 2017, Warren and Republican Lisa Murkowski wrote a letter to President Trump applauding his "stated commitment to addressing opioid addiction" and concurring with his position that the opioid crisis deserved an increase in federal spending. Warren and Murkowski expressed that they were "extremely concerned" that Trump had "yet to take the necessary steps to declare a national emergency on opioids, nor "made any proposals to significantly increase funding to combat the epidemic". The senators wrote that they hoped that Trump would pursue actions supporting his "verbal commitment to fighting the 'serious problem' of opioid addiction with action."

In February 2018, Warren was one of ten senators to sign a letter sent by Dick Durbin and Richard Blumenthal to the Food and Drug Administration urging Commissioner Scott Gottlieb to deny the application from Philip Morris International to market a new "heat not burn" cigarette as less risky than previous versions.

In April 2018, Warren and Representative Elijah Cummings introduced legislation that would impose $100 billion in funding over the period of the following decade to address the opioid epidemic. In a press release, Warren said that the opioid crisis could not be defeated "with empty words and half measures" and that the bill would "funnel millions of dollars directly to the hardest-hit communities and give them the tools to fight back." She noted that Congress had previously enacted legislation to counter the spreading of HIV/AIDS and that Americans "across the country are counting on us to do the same today."

In December 2018, Warren was one of twenty-one senators to sign a letter to Commissioner of Food and Drugs Scott Gottlieb stating their approval of the actions of the Food and Drugs Administration to hinder youth access to e-cigarettes and urging the FDA "to take additional, stronger steps to prevent and reduce e-cigarette use among youth."

In February 2019, Warren was one of eleven senators to sign a letter to insulin manufactures Eli Lilly and Company, Novo Nordisk, and Sanofi over increased insulin prices and charging the price increases with having caused patients to lack "access to the life-saving medications they need."

In April 2019, Warren was one of eleven senators to sign a letter to Juul CEO Kevin Burns asserting that the company had "lost what little remaining credibility the company had when it claimed to care about the public health" and that they would not rest until Juul's "dangerous products are out of the hands of our nation’s children." The senators requested Juul list each one of its advertising buys and detail the steps the company has taken to ensure its advertisements are not seen by people under 21 in addition to asking if Juul had purchased any social media influencers for product promotion.

In June 2019, Warren was one of fifteen senators to introduce the Affordable Medications Act, legislation intended to promote transparency through mandating pharmaceutical companies disclose the amount of money going toward research and development in addition to both marketing and executives' salaries. The bill also abolished the restriction that stopped the federal Medicare program from using its buying power to negotiate lower drug prices for beneficiaries and hinder drug company monopoly practices used to keep prices high and disable less expensive generics entering the market.

==== Cannabis legalization ====
On cannabis policy, Warren says: "Our federal marijuana laws perpetuate our broken criminal justice system, impede research, restrict veterans' access & hinder economic development. Marijuana should be legalized, & I’ll work with anyone – GOP, Dem, Independent, Libertarian, vegetarian – to push for these reforms." She has supported efforts to legalize cannabis at the federal level as a cosponsor of the Marijuana Opportunity Reinvestment and Expungement (MORE) Act, Marijuana Freedom and Opportunity Act, and Marijuana Justice Act. She also introduced the STATES Act in 2018 to allow states that have legalized cannabis for recreational or medical use to do so without federal interference. Warren says if elected president she would take executive action to remove cannabis from the Controlled Substances Act. She further detailed her plans in a February 2020 proposal titled "A Just and Equitable Cannabis Industry".

In January 2018, after Attorney General Jeff Sessions rescinded a memo that discouraged federal prosecutors from bringing marijuana-related charges in states that have legalized recreational use, Warren and Representative Jared Polis penned a letter signed by 52 other members of the House and Senate calling on President Trump to honor a campaign statement that marijuana legalization should be left up to the states and requesting that he urge Sessions "to reinstate the Cole Memorandum".

Warren has called for more research into the use of cannabis as an alternative to opioid painkillers, writing to the Centers for Disease Control and Prevention regarding the matter in 2016 and to Trump nominee for Secretary of Health and Human Services Alex Azar in 2017.

=== Net neutrality ===
In May 2014, days before the FCC was scheduled to rewrite its net neutrality rules, Warren was one of eleven senators to sign a letter to FCC Chairman Tom Wheeler charging Wheeler's proposal with destroying net neutrality instead of preserving it and urged the FCC to "consider reclassifying Internet providers to make them more like traditional phone companies, over which the agency has clear authority to regulate more broadly."

In September 2017, Warren was one of nine senators to sign a letter to Federal Communications Commission Chairman Ajit Pai that charged the FCC with failing "to provide stakeholders with an opportunity to comment on the tens of thousands of filed complaints that directly shed light on proposed changes to existing net neutrality protections."

In March 2018, Warren was one of ten senators to sign a letter spearheaded by Jeff Merkley which lambasted a proposal from FCC Chairman Ajit Pai that would curb the scope of benefits from the Lifeline program, which provided access to high-speed internet to roughly 6.5 million people in poor communities, citing that it was Pai's "obligation to the American public, as the Chairman of the Federal Communications Commission, to improve the Lifeline program and ensure that more Americans can afford access, and have means of access, to broadband and phone service".

In May 2018, Warren voted for a bill that would reinstate net neutrality rules and thereby overturn the FCC's repeal via a law authorizing Congress to reverse regulatory actions by a simple majority vote.

=== Suicide prevention ===
In December 2018, Warren was one of twenty-one senators to sign a letter to United States Secretary of Veterans Affairs Robert Wilkie calling it "appalling that the VA is not conducting oversight of its own outreach efforts" in spite of suicide prevention being the VA's highest clinical priority and requesting Wilkie "consult with experts with proven track records of successful public and mental health outreach campaigns with a particular emphasis on how those individuals measure success."

Warren introduced the Native American Suicide Prevention Act of 2019, which would address suicide prevention for Indigenous Americans.

=== Veterans ===
In September 2018, after a report detailed questionable care at the nursing home of the Bedford VA, Warren sent a letter to United States Secretary of Veterans Affairs Robert Wilkie calling for the Veterans Affairs Department to increase monitoring along with releasing agency inspection reports and giving more oversight to federal lawmakers. Warren wrote that she was "growing sick and tired of hearing and reading heart-wrenching story after heart-wrenching story about veterans treated as if their sacrifices for our country do not matter" and that she had important concerns as to "whether the new leadership at this facility is resulting in significantly improved care or is simply producing more of the same."

=== Animal welfare ===
Warren has supported a moratorium on new concentrated animal feeding operations, a stance which has received praise from animal welfare advocates.

== Other ==
In August 2013, Warren was one of twenty-three Democratic senators to sign a letter to the Defense Department warning of some payday lenders "offering predatory loan products to service members at exorbitant triple digit effective interest rates and loan products that do not include the additional protections envisioned by the law" and asserting that service members along with their families "deserve the strongest possible protections and swift action to ensure that all forms of credit offered to members of our armed forces are safe and sound."

In March 2017, Warren and Tom Carper wrote a letter to Director of the OGE Walter Shaub requesting "information about the ethics rules that President Trump's daughter, Ivanka Trump, will be required to comply with, or has indicated she will voluntarily comply with, in her role as an advisor to the President."

In April 2017, near the end of the first 100 days of the Trump presidency, Warren gave the president an "F" grade. Warren stated that Trump had delivered "a gut punch to America's working people" and that working-class people had also been failed by Trump through his appointing billionaires and bankers to his administration. Warren charged Trump with signing executive orders that made "it easier for government contractors to cheat their employees out of their wages" and simplified the system for "employers who kill or maim their employees to hide that. He makes it easier for investment advisers to cheat retirees."

In February 2018, two days after Rob Porter stepped down as White House Staff Secretary, Warren was one of twelve senators to sign a letter requesting the White House provide details on the allegations of domestic abuse against Porter.

In March 2020, after ending her presidential campaign, her campaign motto "Dream Big and Fight Hard" persisted.

On March 13, 2023, Warren presented a detailed analysis of the collapse of Silicon Valley Bank on March 10, 2023, and provided possible solutions to avoid further bank failures, in The New York Times.
