= Amelia Warren Tyagi =

American business consultant (born 1971)

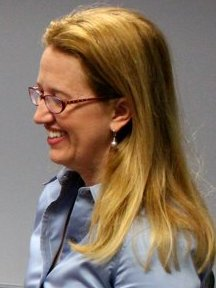

Personal details
- Born: Amelia Louise Warren; September 2, 1971 (age 54) Newark, New Jersey, U.S.
- Spouse: Sushil Tyagi
- Children: 3
- Parent: Elizabeth Warren (mother)
- Relatives: Bruce H. Mann (stepfather)
- Education: Brown University (BA); University of Pennsylvania (MBA)

Amelia Louise Warren Tyagi (born September 2, 1971) is an American businesswoman, management consultant, and author. She co-founded and is president of the placement firm Business Talent Group, is a trustee emeritus of progressive think tank Demos, and co-founded HealthAllies (now part of UnitedHealth Group). She co-authored two books, The Two-Income Trap and All Your Worth, with her mother Elizabeth Warren. She is a board member for the non-profit organization Fuse Corps and a former commentator for the radio show Marketplace.

== Early life and education ==
Tyagi is one of two children of Elizabeth Warren and her first husband, Jim Warren. She has a younger brother named Alexander. Her stepfather, Bruce H. Mann, is a legal scholar. Tyagi earned a Bachelor of Arts degree from Brown University and a Master of Business Administration from the Wharton School of the University of Pennsylvania.

== Career ==
Tyagi worked for consulting company McKinsey & Company before becoming the current president of the Business Talent Group (BTG), which she co-founded in 2007 with Jody Greenstone Miller, BTG's current Chairman of the Board of Directors. BTG works with "40% of Fortune 100 companies" to provide independently contracted talent for business projects.

== Personal life ==
She is married to Sushil Tyagi, a film producer and entrepreneur with whom she has three children. She appeared on Dr. Phil with her mother to promote a book they wrote together. The Cut has called Tyagi her mother's "side kick."
