= The Two-Income Trap =

2004 book by Elizabeth Warren and Amelia Warren Tyagi

The Two-Income Trap: Why Middle-Class Mothers and Fathers Are Going Broke
- Author: Elizabeth Warren; Amelia Warren Tyagi
- Subject: Household income in the United States, personal bankruptcy, personal finance
- Genre: non-fiction
- Publisher: Basic Books
- Publication date: 2004
- Publication place: US
- Pages: 255
- ISBN: 978-0-465-09082-2
- Website: Basic Books

The Two-Income Trap: Why Middle-Class Mothers and Fathers Are Going Broke is a 2004 popular nonfiction book by Elizabeth Warren and her daughter Amelia Warren Tyagi. The book examines the causes of increasing rates of personal bankruptcy and economic insecurity in American households. It was reissued in 2016.

== Authors ==
At the time of publication, Elizabeth Warren was a professor of commercial law at Harvard University, specializing in bankruptcy law. Her earlier writing was primarily aimed at academic audiences. She was considered a leading figure in the then-active debate over personal bankruptcy law, in which she argued for generous access to bankruptcy protection. She would later enter politics, campaigning successfully for the creation of the Consumer Financial Protection Bureau, before being elected US Senator from the state of Massachusetts.

Amelia Warren Tyagi is a management consultant formerly with McKinsey & Company. She holds a Master of Business Administration from The Wharton School.

== Synopsis ==
=== Causal factors ===
The authors present quantitative data to demonstrate how American middle-class families have been left in a precarious financial position by increases in fixed living expenses, increased medical expenses, escalating real estate prices, lower employment security, and the relaxation of credit regulation. The result has been a reshaping of the American labor force, such that many families now rely on having two incomes in order to meet their expenses. This situation represents a greater level of financial risk than that faced by single-income households: the inability of either adult to work, even temporarily, may result in loss of employment, and concomitant loss of medical coverage and the ability to pay bills. This may lead to bankruptcy or being forced to move somewhere less expensive, with associated decreases in educational quality and economic opportunity.

Among the expenses driving the two-income trap are child care, housing in areas with good schools, and college tuition. Warren and Tyagi conclude that having children is the "single best predictor" that a woman will go bankrupt.

Warren and Tyagi call stay-at-home mothers of past generations "the most important part of the safety net", as the non-working mother could step in to earn extra income or care for sick family members when needed. However, Warren and Tyagi dismiss the idea of return to stay-at-home parents, and instead propose policies to offset the loss of this form of insurance.

Warren and Tyagi attempt to overturn the "overconsumption myth" that Americans' financial instabilities are the result of frivolous spending – they note, for instance, that families are spending less on clothing, food (including meals out), and large appliances, when adjusted for inflation, than a generation prior. They also note that dual-income households have less discretionary money than single-income households a generation prior.

=== Proposals ===
The authors propose several solutions to the "two-income trap". In order to decouple educational opportunity from real estate location, they propose allowing families to choose among public schools in their district, with a voucher system. They recommend tuition freezes for public universities, which have seen tuitions rise three times faster than inflation. They endorse universal preschool as a means of reducing fixed costs for families with children. Warren and Tyagi take care to consider possible perverse consequences of various social programs aimed at middle-class economic relief.

Warren and Tyagi also call for the restoration of "usury laws" limiting credit interest rates, and increased disclosure requirements for creditors. They suggest revisiting policies that have encouraged home ownership, such as policies that make mortgages available with little or no down payment. The authors heavily criticize then-Senator Joe Biden for promoting legislation friendly to the banking industry. Biden and Warren would later compete for the Democratic nomination for president in 2020, which Biden would win before going on to win the 2020 United States presidential election.

== Critical response ==
In his review for The New York Times, economic policy consultant Jeff Madrick wrote that Warren and Tyagi "draw too fine a point here and there", but that ultimately "their main thesis is undeniable".

In her review for the journal Educational Horizons, educator Audrey Ricker commented that the book "does a wonderful job of explaining why the American middle class is built on shifting sand", but criticized Warren and Tyagi for failing to explore opportunities afforded by a lower-income lifestyle, and for not including any interviews with families living in reduced economic circumstances.

Journalist Matthew Yglesias revisited the book in early 2019, in light of Warren's candidacy for president in 2020. He praised The Two-Income Trap as "much realer and more interesting than any campaign book". Yglesias found the book to be an important source of insights to the evolution of Warren's policy positions, noting that the policy proposals in the fifteen-year-old book were of a smaller scale than Warren's current platform. In the context of the US in 2019, Yglesias found that the book presented "a striking mismatch between the scale of the problem it identifies and the relatively modest solutions it proposes". At the same time, however, Yglesias calls Warren "way ahead of the political curve" in her criticisms of banking industry practices. Yglesias also noted Warren's emphasis on "normative" two-parent households and the societal value of raising children, which make The Two-Income Trap, in Yglesias' view, "a book social conservatives can love", but one with the potential to hurt Warren's appeal with some feminists.

Matt Bruenig of the People's Policy Project, however, was much more critical. While he concedes that the book contains "valuable nuggets", he believes that its central premise is "based on what can only be described as a completely bogus and misleading analysis of income and consumption trends over time." Bruenig chalks up the apparent discrepancy behind the "two-income trap" to methodological mistakes on Warren's part, such as her making use of the wrong inflation index in her calculations. He argues Warren failed to account for category-specific inflation, with her instead applying overall inflation to each expenditure. He criticizes other oversights on her part, such as citing increased housing costs without considering the trend towards purchasing larger homes in recent decades. He also questions Warren's claim about homemakers acting as a secondary labor source, arguing it is insufficiently supported by evidence. Building on this, he argues that the concerns raised in the book can easily be solved by an expansion of the welfare state, and that conservative interest in the book is "constructing errors on top of errors".
