= Chapter 11, Title 11, United States Code =

Section of the United States Bankruptcy Code

Chapter 11 of the United States Bankruptcy Code (Title 11 of the United States Code) permits reorganization under the bankruptcy laws of the United States. Such reorganization, known as Chapter 11 bankruptcy, is available to every business, whether organized as a corporation, partnership or sole proprietorship, and to individuals, although it is most prominently used by corporate entities. In contrast, Chapter 7 governs the process of a liquidation bankruptcy, though liquidation may also occur under Chapter 11, while Chapter 13 provides a reorganization process for the majority of private individuals.

== Chapter 11 overview ==
When a business is unable to service its debt or pay its creditors, the business or its creditors can file with a federal bankruptcy court for protection under either Chapter 7 or Chapter 11.

In Chapter 7, the business ceases operations, a trustee sells all of its assets, and then distributes the proceeds to its creditors. Any residual amount is returned to the owners of the company.

In Chapter 11, in most instances the debtor remains in control of its business operations as a debtor in possession, and is subject to the oversight and jurisdiction of the court.

A Chapter 11 bankruptcy will result in one of three outcomes for the debtor: reorganization, conversion to Chapter 7 bankruptcy, or dismissal. In order for a Chapter 11 debtor to reorganize, the debtor must file (and the court must confirm) a plan of reorganization. In effect, the plan is a compromise between the major stakeholders in the case, including the debtor and its creditors. Most Chapter 11 cases aim to confirm a plan, but that may not always be possible.

If the judge approves the reorganization plan and the creditors all agree, then the plan can be confirmed. Section 1129 of the Bankruptcy Code requires the bankruptcy court reach certain conclusions prior to confirming or approving the plan and making it binding on all parties in the case, most notably that the plan complies with applicable law and was proposed in good faith. The court must also find that the reorganization plan is feasible in that, unless the plan provides otherwise, the plan is not likely to be followed by further reorganization or liquidation.

In a Chapter 11 bankruptcy, the debtor corporation is typically recapitalized so that it emerges from bankruptcy with more equity and less debt, a process through which some of the debtor corporation's debts may be discharged. Determinations as to which debts are discharged, and how equity and other entitlements are distributed to various groups of investors, are often based on a valuation of the reorganized business. Bankruptcy valuation is often highly contentious because it is both subjective and important to case outcomes. The methods of valuation used in bankruptcy have changed over time, generally tracking methods used in investment banking, Delaware corporate law, and corporate and academic finance, but with a significant time lag.

== Features of Chapter 11 reorganization ==
Chapter 11 retains many of the features present in all or most bankruptcy proceedings in the United States. It provides additional tools for debtors as well. Most importantly, 11 U.S.C. § 1108 empowers the trustee to operate the debtor's business. In Chapter 11, unless a separate trustee is appointed for cause, the debtor, as debtor in possession, acts as trustee of the business.

Chapter 11 affords the debtor to possess several mechanisms to restructure its business. A debtor in possession can acquire financing and loans on favorable terms by giving new lenders first priority on the business's earnings. The court may also permit the debtor in possession to reject and cancel contracts. Debtors are also protected from other litigation against the business through the imposition of an automatic stay. While the automatic stay is in place, creditors are stayed from any collection attempts or activities against the debtor in possession, and most litigation against the debtor is stayed, or put on hold, until it can be resolved in bankruptcy court, or resumed in its original venue. An example of proceedings that are not necessarily stayed automatically is family law proceedings against a spouse or parent. Further, creditors may file with the court seeking relief from the automatic stay.

If the business is insolvent, its debts exceed its assets, and the business is unable to pay debts as they come due, the bankruptcy restructuring may result in the company's owners being left with nothing; instead, the owners' rights and interests are ended and the company's creditors are left with ownership of the newly reorganized company.

All creditors are entitled to be heard by the court. The court is ultimately responsible for determining whether the proposed plan of reorganization complies with bankruptcy laws.

One controversy that has broken out in bankruptcy courts concerns the proper amount of disclosure that the court and other parties are entitled to receive from the members of the creditor's committees that play a large role in many proceedings.

=== Chapter 11 plan ===
Chapter 11 usually results in the reorganization of the debtor's business or personal assets and debts, but can also be used as a mechanism for liquidation. Debtors may "emerge" from a Chapter 11 bankruptcy within a few months or within several years, depending on the size and complexity of the bankruptcy. The Bankruptcy Code accomplishes this objective through the use of a bankruptcy plan. The debtor in possession typically has the first opportunity to propose a plan during the period of exclusivity. This period allows the debtor 120 days from the date of filing for Chapter 11 to propose a plan of reorganization before any other party in interest may propose a plan. If the debtor proposes a plan within the 120-day exclusivity period, a 180-day exclusivity period from the date of filing for Chapter 11 is granted in order to allow the debtor to gain confirmation of the proposed plan. With some exceptions, the plan may be proposed by any party in interest. Interested creditors then vote for a plan.

=== Confirmation ===
If the judge approves the reorganization plan and the creditors agree, the plan can be confirmed. If at least one class of creditors objects and votes against the plan, it may nonetheless be confirmed if the requirements of cramdown are met. In order to be confirmed over the creditors' objection, the plan must not discriminate against that class of creditors, and the plan must be found fair and equitable to that class. Upon confirmation, the plan becomes binding and identifies the treatment of debts and operations of the business for the duration of the plan. If a plan cannot be confirmed, the court may either convert the case to a liquidation under Chapter 7 or, if, in the best interests of the creditors and the estate, the case may be dismissed, resulting in a return to the status quo before bankruptcy. If the case is dismissed, creditors will look to non-bankruptcy law in order to satisfy their claims.

In order to proceed to the confirmation hearing, the bankruptcy court must approve a disclosure statement. Once the disclosure statement is approved, the plan proponent will solicit votes from the classes of creditors. Solicitation is the process by which creditors vote on the proposed confirmation plan. This process can be complicated if creditors fail or refuse to vote. In this case, the plan proponent might tailor his or her efforts to obtain votes, or the plan itself. The plan may be modified before confirmation, so long as the modified plan meets all the requirements of Chapter 11.

A chapter 11 case typically results in one of three outcomes: a reorganization, a conversion into chapter 7 liquidation, or it is dismissed.

For a Chapter 11 debtor to reorganize, they must file (and the court must confirm) a reorganization plan. Simply put, the plan is a compromise between the major stakeholders in the case, including, but not limited to the debtor and its creditors. Most chapter 11 cases aim to confirm a plan, but that may not always be possible. Section 1121(b) of the Bankruptcy Code provides for an exclusivity period in which only the debtor may file a plan of reorganization. This period lasts 120 days after the date of the order for relief, and if the debtor does file a plan within the first 120 days, the exclusivity period is extended to 180 days after the order for relief for the debtor to seek acceptance of the plan by holders of claims and interests.

If the judge approves the reorganization plan and the creditors all "agree", then the plan can be confirmed. §1129 of the Bankruptcy Code requires the bankruptcy court reach certain conclusions prior to "confirming" or "approving" the plan and making it binding on all parties in the case. Most importantly, the bankruptcy court must find the plan (a) complies with applicable law, and (b) has been proposed in good faith. Furthermore, the court must determine whether the plan is "feasible," In other words, the court must safeguard that confirming the plan will not yield to liquidation down the road.

The plan must ensure that the debtor will be able to pay most administrative and priority claims (priority claims over unsecured claims) on the effective date.

=== Automatic stay ===
Like other forms of bankruptcy, petitions filed under Chapter 11 invoke the automatic stay of § 362. The automatic stay requires all creditors to cease collection attempts, making many post-petition debt collection efforts void or voidable. Under some circumstances, some creditors, or the United States Trustee, can request the court convert the case into a liquidation under Chapter 7 or appoint a trustee to manage the debtor's business. The court will grant a motion to convert to Chapter 7 or appoint a trustee if either of these actions is in the best interest of all creditors. Sometimes, a company will liquidate under Chapter 11 (perhaps in a 363 sale), in which the pre-existing management may be able to help get a higher price for divisions or other assets than a Chapter 7 liquidation would be likely to achieve. Section 362(d) of the Bankruptcy Code allows the court to terminate, annul, or modify the continuation of the automatic stay as may be necessary or appropriate to balance the competing interests of the debtor, its estate, creditors, and other parties in interest and grants the bankruptcy court considerable flexibility to tailor relief to the exigencies of the circumstances. Relief from the automatic stay is generally sought by motion and, if opposed, is treated as a contested matter under Bankruptcy Rule 9014. A party seeking relief from the automatic stay must also pay the filing fee required by 28 U.S.C.A. § 1930(b).

=== Executory contracts ===
In the new millennium, airlines have fallen under intense scrutiny for what many see as abusing Chapter 11 bankruptcy as a tool for escaping labor contracts, usually 30–35% of an airline's operating cost. Every major US airline has filed for Chapter 11 since 2002. In the space of 2 years (2002–2004) US Airways filed for bankruptcy twice leaving the AFL–CIO, pilot unions and other airline employees claiming the rules of Chapter 11 have helped turn the United States into a corporatocracy. The trustee or debtor-in-possession is given the right, under § 365 of the Bankruptcy Code, subject to court approval, to assume or reject executory contracts and unexpired leases. The trustee or debtor-in-possession must assume or reject an executory contract in its entirety unless some portion of it is severable. The trustee or debtor-in-possession normally assumes a contract or lease if it is needed to operate the reorganized business or if it can be assigned or sold at a profit. The trustee or debtor-in-possession normally rejects a contract or lease to transform damage claims arising from the nonperformance of those obligations into a prepetition claim. In some situations, rejection can limit the damages a contract counterparty can claim against the debtor.

=== Priority ===
Chapter 11 follows the same priority scheme as other bankruptcy chapters. The priority structure is defined primarily by § 507 of the Bankruptcy Code (11 U.S.C. § 507).

As a general rule, administrative expenses (the actual, necessary expenses of preserving the bankruptcy estate, including expenses such as employee wages and the cost of litigating the Chapter 11 case) are paid first. Secured creditors—creditors who have a security interest, or collateral, in the debtor's property—will be paid before unsecured creditors. Unsecured creditors' claims are prioritized by § 507. For instance, the claims of suppliers of products or employees of a company may be paid before other unsecured creditors are paid. Each priority level must be paid in full before the next lower priority level may receive payment.

=== Section 1110 ===
Section 1110 (11 U.S.C. § 1110) generally provides a secured party with an interest in an aircraft the ability to take possession of the equipment within 60 days after a bankruptcy filing unless the airline cures all defaults. More specifically, the right of the lender to take possession of the secured equipment is not hampered by the automatic stay provisions of the Bankruptcy Code.

=== Subchapter V ===
In August 2019, the Small Business Reorganization Act of 2019 ("SBRA") added Subchapter V to Chapter 11 of the Bankruptcy Code. Subchapter V, which took effect in February 2020, is reserved exclusively for small business debtors to expedite bankruptcy procedures and economically resolve small business bankruptcy cases.

Subchapter V retains many of the advantages of a traditional Chapter 11 case without the unnecessary procedural burdens and costs. It seeks to increase the debtor's ability to negotiate a successful reorganization, retain control of the business, increase oversight, and ensure a quick reorganization.

A Subchapter V case contrasts with a traditional Chapter 11 in several key aspects: it is earmarked only for the "small business debtor" (as defined by the Bankruptcy Code), so only a debtor can file a plan of reorganization. The SBRA requires the U.S. Trustee to appoint a "Subchapter V trustee" to every Subchapter V case to supervise and control estate funds and facilitate the development of a consensual plan. It also eliminates the automatic appointment of an official committee of unsecured creditors and abolishes quarterly fees usually paid to the U.S. Trustee throughout the case. Most notably, Subchapter V allows the small business owner to retain their equity in the business so long as the reorganization plan does not discriminate unfairly and is fair and equitable with respect to each class of claims or interests.

== Considerations ==
The reorganization and court process may take an inordinate amount of time, limiting the chances of a successful outcome and sufficient debtor-in-possession financing may be unavailable during an economic recession. A preplanned, pre-agreed approach between the debtor and its creditors (sometimes called a pre-packaged bankruptcy) may facilitate the desired result. A company undergoing Chapter 11 reorganization is effectively operating under the "protection" of the court until it emerges. An example is the airline industry in the United States; in 2006 over half the industry's seating capacity was on airlines that were in Chapter 11. These airlines were able to stop making debt payments, break their previously agreed upon labor union contracts, freeing up cash to expand routes or weather a price war against competitors — all with the bankruptcy court's approval.

Studies on the impact of forestalling the creditors' rights to enforce their security reach different conclusions.

== Statistics ==
=== Frequency ===
Chapter 11 cases dropped by 60% from 1991 to 2003. One 2007 study found this was because businesses were turning to bankruptcy-like proceedings under state law, rather than the federal bankruptcy proceedings, including those under chapter 11. Insolvency proceedings under state law, the study stated, are currently faster, less expensive, and more private, with some states not even requiring court filings. However, a 2005 study claimed the drop may have been due to an increase in the incorrect classification of many bankruptcies as "consumer cases" rather than "business cases".

Cases involving more than US$50 million in assets are almost always handled in federal bankruptcy court, and not in bankruptcy-like state proceeding.

=== Largest cases ===
The largest bankruptcy in history was of the US investment bank Lehman Brothers Holdings Inc., which listed $639 billion in assets as of its Chapter 11 filing in 2008. The 16 largest corporate bankruptcies as of December 13, 2011

- # Company did not emerge from Chapter 11 bankruptcy

| Company | Filing date | Total Assets pre-filing | Assets adjusted to the year 2012 | Filing court district |
|---|---|---|---|---|
| Lehman Brothers Holdings Inc. # | 15 September 2008 | $639,063,000,800 | $956 billion | NY-S |
| Washington Mutual # | 26 September 2008 | $327,913,000,000 | $490 billion | DE |
| Worldcom Inc. | 21 July 2002 | $103,914,000,000 | $186 billion | NY-S |
| General Motors Corporation | 1 June 2009 | $82,300,000,000 | $124 billion | NY-S |
| CIT Group | 1 November 2009 | $71,019,200,000 | $107 billion | NY-S |
| Enron Corp. #‡ | 2 December 2001 | $63,392,000,000 | $115 billion | NY-S |
| Conseco, Inc. | 18 December 2002 | $61,392,000,000 | $110 billion | IL-N |
| MF Global # | 31 October 2011 | $41,000,000,000 | $58.7 billion | NY-S |
| Chrysler LLC | 30 April 2009 | $39,300,000,000 | $59 billion | NY-S |
| Texaco, Inc. | 12 April 1987 | $35,892,000,000 | $102 billion | NY-S |
| Financial Corp. of America | 9 September 1988 | $33,864,000,000 | $92.2 billion | CA-C |
| Penn Central Transportation Company # | 21 June 1970 | $7,000,000,000 | $58 billion | PA-S |
| Refco Inc. # | 17 October 2005 | $33,333,172,000 | $54.9 billion | NY-S |
| Global Crossing Ltd. | 28 January 2002 | $30,185,000,000 | $54 billion | NY-S |
| Pacific Gas and Electric Co. | 6 April 2001 | $29,770,000,000 | $54.1 billion | CA-N |
| UAL Corp. | 9 December 2002 | $25,197,000,000 | $45.1 billion | IL-N |
| Delta Air Lines, Inc. | 14 September 2005 | $21,801,000,000 | $35.9 billion | NY-S |
| Delphi Corporation, Inc. | 8 October 2005 | $22,000,000,000 | $35.9 billion | NY-S |

Enron, Lehman Brothers, MF Global and Refco have all ceased operations while others were acquired by other buyers or emerged as a new company with a similar name.

‡ The Enron assets were taken from the 10-Q filed on November 11, 2001. The company announced that the annual financials were under review at the time of filing for Chapter 11.

== See also ==
- 722 redemption
- Administration (law) in the United Kingdom, Australia, and New Zealand
- Examinership in Ireland
- Insolvency law of Canada
- List of private equity owned companies that have filed for bankruptcy
