= Political positions of Kirsten Gillibrand =

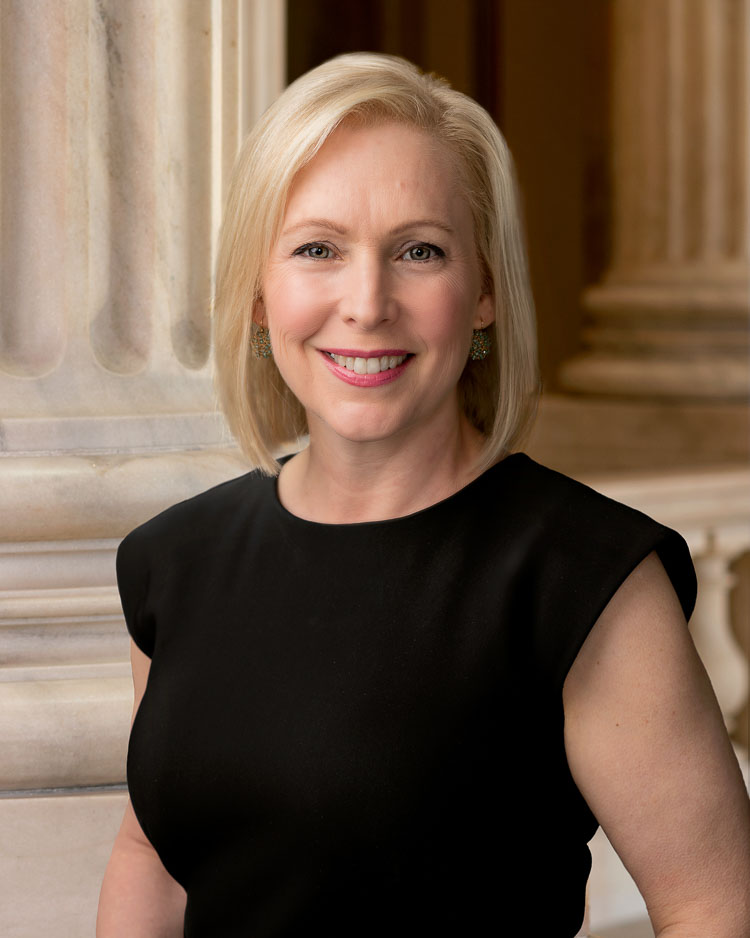
Senator Kirsten Gillibrand of New York.

Kirsten Gillibrand is the junior United States senator from New York and a member of the Democratic Party. Formerly a member of the United States House of Representatives from the generally conservative 20th congressional district, she was appointed to the Senate in 2009, representing a generally liberal state.

In the House, she was known as a conservative Democrat or centrist, serving at the will of a highly conservative electorate. She was a member of the Blue Dog Coalition, a caucus of conservative Democrats. In the Senate, she is known as one of the more liberal Senators, as she represents a heavily Democratic state. At the time of her appointment to the Senate, a Salon editorial said that her reputation in the House characterized her as "a hybrid politician who has remained conservative enough to keep her seat while appearing progressive enough to raise money downstate."

== Domestic policy ==
=== Social issues ===
==== LGBT ====
While running for New York's 20th congressional district in 2006, Gillibrand said in an interview she favors legalizing civil unions across the country and leaving the issue of same-sex marriage up the states to decide. As senator, Gillibrand said in 2010 that she supported the legalization of same-sex marriage in the State of New York.

The Human Rights Campaign, an LGBT advocacy group, gave Gillibrand a score of 80 out of 100 for the 110th Congress (when Gillibrand was in the House), and perfect scores of 100 out of 100 for the 111th, 112th, and 113th Congresses (when Gillibrand was in the Senate).

While in the House of Representatives, she voted for both the Sexual Orientation Employment Nondiscrimination Act (ENDA) and Local Law Enforcement Hate Crimes Prevention Act of 2007.

Following her appointment to the Senate, Gillibrand became the first New York Senator to support same-sex marriage. On the morning of her appointment to the Senate, she called the Empire State Pride Agenda to reiterate her full support for same-sex marriage. Gillibrand also supported the repeal of the Defense of Marriage Act (DOMA) and the "don't ask, don't tell" policy. In April 2009, Gillibrand endorsed Governor Paterson's proposed legislation to legalize same-sex marriage in New York.

In July 2009, Gillibrand announced she was considering introducing an amendment to the defense authorization bill that would impose an 18-month moratorium on the discharge of gays serving in the military. She decided against introducing the amendment, as she could not amass the 60 votes required to avoid a filibuster, but told The Daily Beast that she was able to secure the commitment of the Senate Armed Services Committee to hold hearings on "don't ask, don't tell" in the fall of 2009. However, the hearings were postponed and began on February 2, 2010. The repeal ultimately passed both Houses of Congress and was signed by President Obama on December 22, 2010. In 2010, the Human Rights Campaign gave her a 100% rating from the LGBT advocacy group.

On March 16, 2011, Gillibrand, along with Senators Dianne Feinstein and Patrick Leahy, introduced a bill to repeal DOMA.

In 2011, Gillibrand heavily lobbied undecided members of the New York State Senate to pass a bill legalizing same-sex marriage in New York. The bill ultimately passed the New York State Senate and the New York State Assembly, and was signed by New York Governor Andrew Cuomo, on June 24, 2011.

In May 2017, Gillibrand was one of 46 senators to introduce the Equality Act of 2017, described by Representative David Cicilline as ensuring "that every LGBT person can live their lives free from the fear of discrimination. Above all, it’s about honoring the values that have guided our nation since its founding. It’s critical that Congress pass the Equality Act into law."

In October 2018, Gillibrand was one of 20 senators to sign a letter to Secretary of State Mike Pompeo urging Pompeo to reverse the rolling back of a policy that granted visas to same-sex partners of LGBTQ diplomats who had unions which were not recognized by their home countries, writing that too many places around the world have seen LGBTQ individuals "subjected to discrimination and unspeakable violence, and receive little or no protection from the law or local authorities" and that the US refusing to let LGBTQ diplomats bring their partners to the US would be equivalent of America upholding "the discriminatory policies of many countries around the world."

In June 2019, Gillibrand was one of 18 senators to sign a letter to Secretary of State Pompeo requesting an explanation of a decision by the State Department to not issue an official statement that year commemorating Pride Month nor issue the annual cable outlining activities for embassies commemorating Pride Month. They also questioned why the LGBTQ special envoy position had remained vacant and asserted that "preventing the official flying of rainbow flags and limiting public messages celebrating Pride Month signals to the international community that the United States is abandoning the advancement of LGBTQ rights as a foreign policy priority."

In December 2024, Gillibrand voted to strip treatment for gender dysphoria from children of military personnel on TRICARE as part of the National Defense Authorization act.

==== Abortion and contraception ====
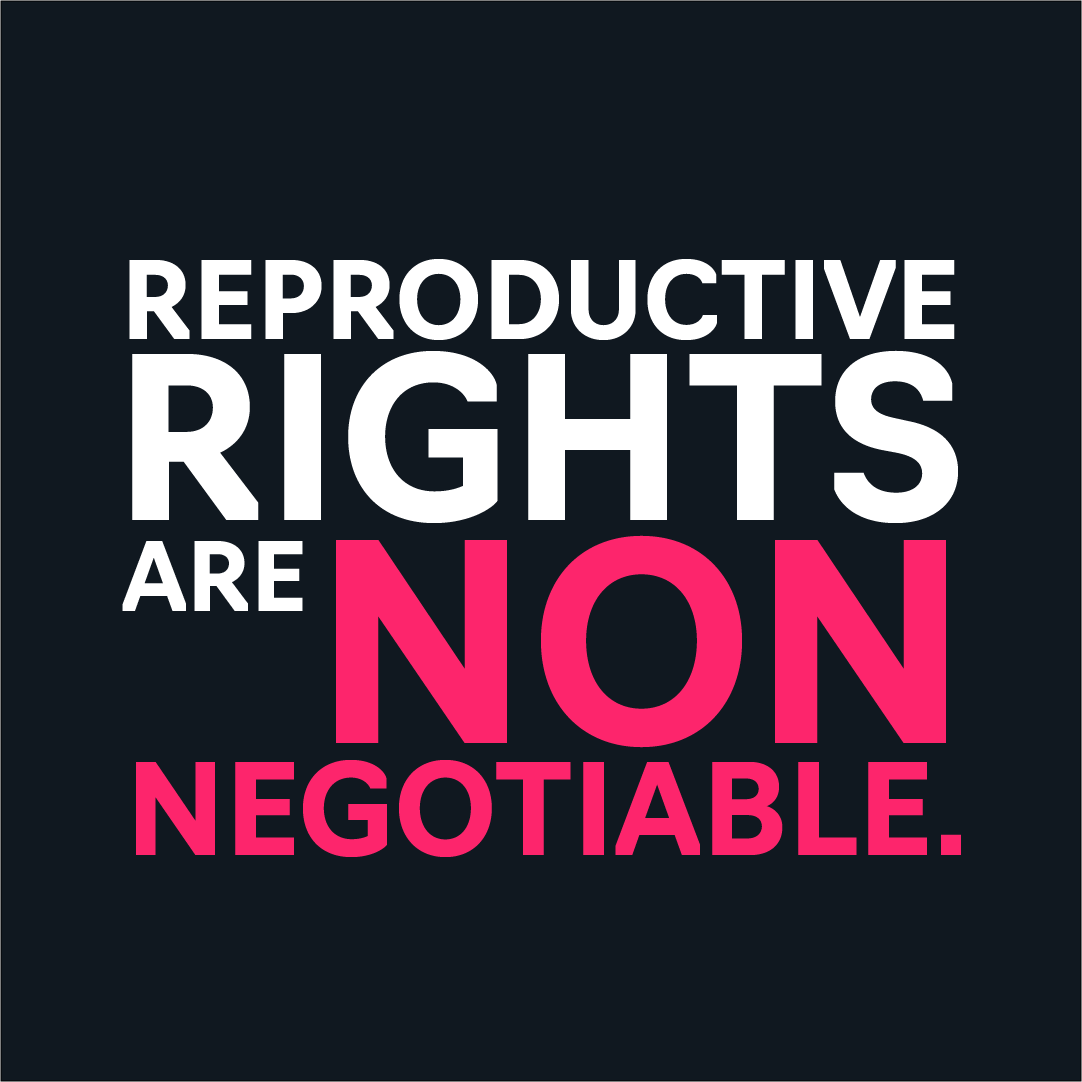
Gillibrand 2020 presidential campaign poster

Gillibrand supports abortion rights, stating on her Senate website, "I will always protect a woman's right to choose—no matter what." Gillibrand has voted in favor of federal funding of embryonic stem cell research, contraception, and supporting United Nations Population Fund programs. In 2010, she voted against Ben Nelson's proposed amendment to the Affordable Care Act which would have prohibited the government from allowing insurance plans that cover abortion in a national healthcare exchange. She expressed strong opposition to House Republicans' No Taxpayer Funding for Abortion Act in early 2011, stating, in her opinion, that the act "disregards women’s rights and restricts the ability of women to access affordable health care."

==== Agriculture ====
In March 2019, Gillibrand was one of 38 senators to sign a letter to Secretary of Agriculture Sonny Perdue warning that dairy farmers "have continued to face market instability and are struggling to survive the fourth year of sustained low prices" and urging his department to "strongly encourage these farmers to consider the Dairy Margin Coverage program."

In May 2019, Gillibrand and eight other Democratic senators sent a letter to Agriculture Secretary Perdue where they criticized the USDA for purchasing pork from JBS USA and wrote that it was "counterproductive and contradictory" for large foreign companies to receive funding from "U.S. taxpayer dollars intended to help American farmers struggling with this administration's trade policy." The senators requested the department "ensure these commodity purchases are carried out in a manner that most benefits the American farmer’s bottom line—not the business interests of foreign corporations."

In June 2019, Gillibrand and Republican Lisa Murkowski announced the Summer Meals Act of 2019, legislation altering the Summer Food Service Program of the Agriculture Department to grant more children access to summer meals in addition to providing transportation for children in rural and hard-to-reach areas to aid their access of summer meals along with imposing flexibility to the program so children can have more than one meal.

In June 2019, Gillibrand and 18 other Democratic senators sent a letter to USDA Inspector General (IG) Phyllis K. Fong with the request that the IG investigate USDA instances of retaliation and political decision-making and asserted that not conducting an investigation would mean these "actions could be perceived as a part of this administration’s broader pattern of not only discounting the value of federal employees but suppressing, undermining, discounting, and wholesale ignoring scientific data produced by their own qualified scientists."

In 2019, Gillibrand proposed a bill that would have enabled the government to make inspections of Concentrated Animal Farming Operations (referred to by critics as "factory farms") implicated in the outbreak of foodborne illness.

==== Gun laws ====
Gillibrand's position on gun rights has changed from being against strict gun control in the House to being more "flexible" on the issue since she joined the Senate. While in the House, she had received a 100% positive rating from the National Rifle Association of America, and sponsored an amendment to the 2008 Farm Bill that would have allowed expanded hunting on public lands. On the other hand, Gillibrand worked to strengthen the National Instant Criminal Background Check System Improvement Act.

Gillibrand's pro-gun rights positions received scrutiny after her appointment to the Senate and were the object of criticism by some of her fellow New York Democrats, particularly those in the New York City area. Within days of her being named to the Senate, Gillibrand indicated that her pro-gun rights position was "flexible". By late 2010, the NRA had regraded Gillibrand to an F rating, citing her votes against NRA-backed bills.

In one of her first votes as a senator, Gillibrand voted to reject a measure that would have expanded gun rights in the District of Columbia. While Gillibrand's spokesman characterized the vote as consistent with her previous view that local governments have the right to determine gun restrictions, the Albany Times Union noted that her position was counter to her vote just five months earlier on an almost identical House bill. She co-authored the Gun Trafficking Prevention Act of 2009 (Note: S. 2878; after being read twice on the floor, it was sent to the Committee on the Judiciary, where it died.) with Congresswoman Carolyn McCarthy, a longtime advocate of gun control. Gillibrand also opposed federal legislation that would have allowed American citizens to carry concealed firearms across state lines even if they were legally allowed to carry the weapons in their home states.

Gillibrand's support of gun rights has been characterized more specifically as support of hunters' rights. Despite her mother being an avid hunter, Gillibrand has never hunted before, though she has shot skeet.

In January 2016, Gillibrand was one of 18 senators to sign a letter to Thad Cochran and Barbara Mikulski requesting that the Labor, Health and Education subcommittee hold a hearing on whether to allow the Centers for Disease Control and Prevention (CDC) to fund a study of gun violence and "the annual appropriations rider that some have interpreted as preventing it" with taxpayer dollars. The senators noted their support for taking steps "to fund gun-violence research, because only the United States government is in a position to establish an integrated public-health research agenda to understand the causes of gun violence and identify the most effective strategies for prevention."

Following the Las Vegas shooting in October 2017, Gillibrand was one of 24 senators to sign a letter to National Institutes of Health Director Dr. Francis Collins espousing the view that it was critical the NIH "dedicate a portion of its resources to the public health consequences of gun violence" at a time when 93 Americans die per day from gun-related fatalities and noted that the Dickey Amendment did not prohibit objective, scientific inquiries into shooting death prevention.

In November 2017, Gillibrand was a cosponsor of the Military Domestic Violence Reporting Enhancement Act, a bill that would form a charge of Domestic Violence under the Uniform Code of Military Justice (UCMJ) and stipulate that convictions would have to be reported to federal databases with the authority to keep abusers from purchasing firearms within three days in an attempt to close a loophole in the Uniform Code of Military Justice (UCMJ) through which convicted abusers retained the ability to purchase firearms. Gillibrand stated that the bill would upgrade American military law and called on colleagues to join her and the other cosponsors "in fighting to pass this bill."

In January 2019, Gillibrand was one of 40 senators to introduce the Background Check Expansion Act, a bill that would require background checks for either the sale or transfer of all firearms including all unlicensed sellers. Exceptions to the bill's background check requirement included transfers between members of law enforcement, loaning firearms for either hunting or sporting events on a temporary basis, providing firearms as gifts to members of one's immediate family, firearms being transferred as part of an inheritance, or giving a firearm to another person temporarily for immediate self-defense.

In February 2019, Gillibrand was one of 38 senators to sign a letter to Senate Judiciary Committee Chairman Lindsey Graham calling on him to "hold a hearing" on universal background checks and noted Graham's statement in the press that he "intended to have the Committee work on ‘red flag’ legislation and potentially also background checks", actions the senators indicated their support for.

At a June 2019 town hall, Gillibrand referred to the NRA as "the worst organization" in the United States and charged the NRA with caring more about profits than Americans and cited the enactment of universal background checks and a federal gun trafficking law, and a ban on bump stocks, weapons that were military styled and high-capacity magazines as the steps she would take to address gun violence as U.S. president. She furthered that the NRA was lying to Americans and that sales were the organization's objective as opposed to protecting the Second Amendment.

==== Census ====
In June 2019, Gillibrand was one of 28 senators to sign a letter led by Brian Schatz to Secretary of Commerce Wilbur Ross warning that Ross would "further delay and jeopardize the Census Bureau’s ability to conduct a full, fair, and accurate decennial census as required by the U.S. Constitution and the Census Act" by continuing to attempt adding the citizenship question to 2020 census materials. The senators urged Ross to "allow the Census Bureau to proceed with preparation for a 2020 census without a citizenship question on the questionnaire."

==== Childcare ====
In 2019, Gillibrand and 34 other senators introduced the Child Care for Working Families Act, a bill that created 770,000 new childcare jobs and that ensured families under 75 percent of the state median income did not pay for childcare with higher-earning families having to pay "their fair share for care on a sliding scale, regardless of the number of children they have." The legislation also supported universal access to high-quality preschool programs for all 3 and 4-year-olds and gave the childcare workforce a changed compensation and training to aid both teachers and caregivers.

==== Children's programming ====
In 2019, following the announcement by the Federal Communications Commission (FCC) of rules changes to children's programming through modifying the Children's Television Act of 1990, Gillibrand and eight other Democratic senators signed a letter to FCC Chairman Ajit Pai that expressed concern that the proposed changes "would limit the reach of educational content available to children and have a particular damaging effect on youth in low-income and minority communities" and asserted that the new rules would see a reduction in access to valuable educational content through over-the-air services.

==== Criminal justice reform ====
In February 2013, Gillibrand was one of 24 senators to sign a letter asserting that Sikh, Hindu and Arab Americans were often targets of violence because they were mistaken for being radical Muslims and citing the importance of the federal government to "begin tracking information about anti-Sikh, anti-Hindu and anti-Arab hate crimes as soon as possible so that law enforcement can more effectively respond to this threat."

In December 2018, Gillibrand stated her hope that the No Cash Bail Act would be one of the first bills introduced in the 116th Congress, legislation that she said would require states to implement alternative pretrial systems along with a reduction in pretrial jail populations should they request receiving federal funding as part of an incentive program in addition to withholding grant funding from states that continue to utilize cash bail. Gillibrand furthered that the US should not imprison individuals that could not afford their bail and that the US "is much better than that and I believe we need to give people the opportunity to thrive, to help them when they're down, to make sure they actually have access to the rehabilitation they might need when things go wrong."

In December 2018, Gillibrand voted for the First Step Act, legislation aimed at reducing recidivism rates among federal prisoners through expanding job training and other programs in addition to forming an expansion of early-release programs and modifications on sentencing laws such as mandatory minimum sentences for nonviolent drug offenders, "to more equitably punish drug offenders."

==== Disaster relief ====
In April 2018, Gillibrand was one of five Democratic senators to sign a letter to FEMA administrator Brock Long calling on FEMA to enter an agreement with the United States Department of Housing and Urban Development that would "stand up the Disaster Housing Assistance Program and address the medium- and longer-term housing needs" of evacuees of Puerto Rico in the aftermath of Hurricane Maria. The senators asserted that "FEMA's refusal to use the tools at its disposal, including DHAP, to help these survivors is puzzling -- and profoundly troubling" and that hundreds of hurricane survivors were susceptible to being left homeless if FEMA and HUD continued to not work together.

==== Drug policy ====
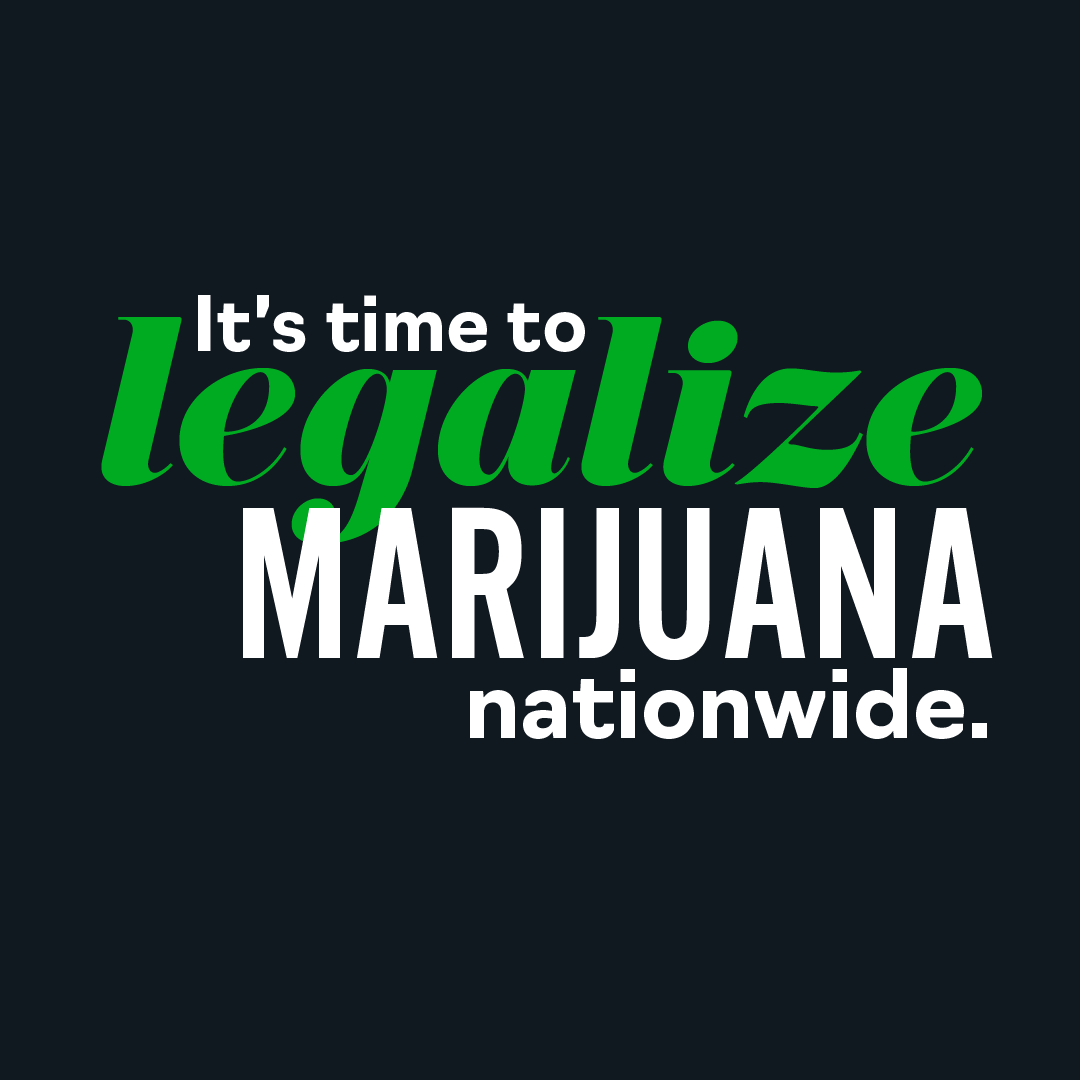
Gillibrand 2020 presidential campaign poster

In December 2018, Gillibrand was one of 21 senators to sign a letter to Food and Drugs Commissioner Scott Gottlieb stating their approval of the actions of the Food and Drugs Administration (FDA) to hinder youth access to e-cigarettes and urging the FDA "to take additional, stronger steps to prevent and reduce e-cigarette use among youth."

In June 2019, Gillibrand unveiled a proposal to legalize marijuana that included the establishment of a process that would both regulate and tax marijuana production in addition to expunging all nonviolent marijuana convictions and expanding medical access to marijuana to every private and most federal health plans. The proposal also included research into the drug's health benefits being financed and allocating funds gained through taxes to both communities of color and women and minority-owned small cannabis businesses. Gillibrand admitted the positive effects that had come through marijuana's statewide legalization in Washington and Colorado, but asserted that "a state-by-state patchwork is not enough to tackle the deeply rooted racial, social, and economic injustices within our marijuana laws, or to fully unleash the economic equity and opportunity of marijuana legalization."

==== Horse racing ====
In June 2019, Gillibrand and Arizona senator Martha McSally cosponsored the Horse Racing Integrity Act, a bill that would form a national standard for drug restrictions, testing, and enforcement at venues for horse racing that presently operated under both varied and conflicting regulations of their respective states and establish the U.S. Horseracing Anti-Doping and Medication Control Authority to enforce drug bans and rules. The bill was introduced in the aftermath of a spike in racehorse deaths at various tracks that had stirred controversy from animal rights groups.

==== Truck underride crashes ====
In March 2019, Gillibrand, along with senator Marco Rubio and Representatives Steve Cohen and Mark DeSaulnier, introduced the Stop Underrides Act. The bill would require underride guards on both the sides and front of a truck in addition to changing standards for underride guards on the back of trucks. Gillibrand spoke of the enabling of Congress "to make simple and commonsense changes that would save lives on the roads" and said that the bill would "protect passengers and help keep our roads safer."

==== Maternal mortality ====
In May 2019, Gillibrand was one of six senators to cosponsor the Healthy MOMMIES Act, legislation that would expand Medicaid coverage in an attempt to provide comprehensive prenatal, labor and postpartum care with an extension of the Medicaid pregnancy pathway from 60 days to a full year following birth for the purpose of assuring new mothers have access to services unrelated to pregnancy. The bill also directed Medicaid and the Children's Health Insurance Program's Payment and Access Commission report its data regarding doula care coverage under state Medicaid programs and subsequently develop strategies aimed at improving access to doula care.

==== Opioids ====
In February 2017, Gillibrand and 30 other senators signed a letter to Kaléo Pharmaceuticals in response to the opioid-overdose-reversing device Evzio rising in price from $690 in 2014 to $4,500 and requested the company answer what the detailed price structure for Evzio was, the number of devices Kaléo Pharmaceuticals set aside for donation, and the totality of federal reimbursements Evzio received in the previous year.

In March 2017, Gillibrand was one of 21 senators to sign a letter led by Ed Markey to Senate Majority Leader Mitch McConnell which noted that 12 percent of adult Medicaid beneficiaries had some form or a substance abuse disorder in addition to one third of treatment administered for opioid and other substance use disorders in the United States being financed through Medicaid and opined that the American Health Care Act could "very literally translate into a death spiral for those with opioid use disorders" due to the insurance coverage lacking and not having the adequate funds to afford care oftentimes resulting in individuals abandoning substance use disorder treatment.

In March 2019, Gillibrand and Colorado senator Cory Gardner introduced the John S. McCain Opioid Addiction and Prevention Act, a bill that would require doctors and other medical professionals to limit opioid prescriptions for the first treatment of acute pain to no more than a supply of seven days. Gillibrand stated that too many in her home state of New York and across the US had been affected by the opioid epidemic and they needed to be proactive in addressing the issue.

==== Workplace harassment ====
In March 2018, along with Amy Klobuchar and Patty Murray, Gillibrand led a letter signed by all 22 female U.S. senators to Senate Majority Leader Mitch McConnell and Senate Minority Leader Chuck Schumer that called for changes to a 1995 statute that formed the present policy for addressing workplace misconduct complaints on Capitol Hill and specified their support for an update to the policy that would streamline the process of reporting sexual harassment in addition to granting staffers more resources in filing reports.

In April 2019, Gillibrand signed onto the Be HEARD Act, legislation intended to abolish the tipped minimum wage along with ending mandatory arbitration and pre-employment nondisclosure agreements. The bill also gave workers additional time to report harassment and was said by co-sponsor Patty Murray to come at a time when too many workers are "still silenced by mandatory disclosure agreements that prevent them from discussing sexual harassment and longstanding practices like the tipped wages that keep workers in certain industries especially vulnerable."

In July 2019, Gillibrand signed a letter to Secretary of Labor Alexander Acosta that advocated for the U.S. Occupational Safety and Health Administration to initiate a full investigation into a complaint filed on May 20 by a group of Chicago-area employees of McDonald's, which detailed workplace violence incidents that included interactions with customers such as customers throwing hot coffee and threatening employees with firearms and more. The senators argued that McDonald's could and needed to "do more to protect its employees, but employers will not take seriously their obligations to provide a safe workplace if OSHA does not enforce workers rights to a hazard-free workplace."

In March 2021, Gillibrand appeared on PBS' NewsHour to speak on sexual assault/harassment in the military, calling it an 'epidemic'. In April 2021, Gillibrand supported the Vanessa Guillen Military Justice Improvement and Increasing Prevention Act. The bill would shift the decision to prosecute sexual crimes from military command. The bill was named after Vanessa Guillen, a soldier in the US Army who went missing from Fort Hood in April 2020 after experiencing sexual harassment at the hands of a sergeant.

=== Fiscal issues ===
==== Economy ====
During the 2008 financial crisis, Gillibrand, then a member of the House of Representatives, voted twice against the Emergency Economic Stabilization Act of 2008, calling it "fundamentally flawed". However, she did vote for the auto industry bailout in December 2008.

At a press conference on January 25, 2009, Gillibrand said that during her first week in the Senate, she would work to ensure that the stimulus bill included relief funds for New York State. She supported the President's recovery plan and budget, and voted for cram down to allow judges to write down mortgages of struggling homeowners. In 2009, as a senator, Gillibrand voted for the Stimulus Package.

In August 2011, Gillibrand voted against raising the U.S. debt ceiling, stating: "We could have gone further in reducing America’s debt with a sensible compromise that both cut discretionary spending and raised revenues. It is unfortunate Congress missed that opportunity".

In the House of Representatives, Gillibrand supported the Bush tax cuts. In 2012, while in the Senate, Gillibrand voted for extending them, but against an amendment extending them for those earning more than $200,000 or couples earning more than $250,000.

In 2017, Gillibrand worked with Sen. Bernie Sanders (among others) to advance employee stock ownership plans, introducing legislation that would help workers form employee-owned businesses.

In February 2019, Gillibrand was one of eight senators to sign a letter to the Federal Communications Commission and Department of Justice advocating for regulators to renounce a proposed $26 billion merger between T-Mobile and Sprint, writing that American enforcers have understood for the last thirty years "that fostering robust competition in telecommunications markets is the best way to provide every American with access to high-quality, cutting-edge communications at a reasonable price" and the merger would result in a return for "Americans to the dark days of heavily consolidated markets and less competition, with all of the resulting harms."

In May 2019, Gillibrand and Delaware senator Chris Coons introduced the Global Leadership in Advanced Manufacturing Act, a bill that would develop new institutes that supported American manufacturing in technology and grant more federal investment in the national network such as preexisting institutes being made to compete globally as well as continue American economic and national security. Gillibrand said the bill "would improve job training programs and support entrepreneurs, creating more opportunities for our workers to succeed in manufacturing."

In May 2019, Gillibrand unveiled the Family Bill of Rights, a proposal intended to protect adoption and IVF rights for all parents with disregard of religion, sexual orientation or gender identity through a provision meant to overturn state laws authorizing the aforementioned groups being discriminated against by private adoption agencies. The legislation also included the right to "a safe and healthy pregnancy" and entitlements to universal pre-K and affordable child care. Gillibrand stated that the bill would "make all families stronger — regardless of who you are or what your zip code is — with a fundamental set of rights that levels the playing field starting at birth" and that passing the Family Bill of Rights would be one of the priorities of her first one hundred days as president.

==== Government shutdown ====
In March 2019, Gillibrand was among 39 senators to have signed a letter to the Appropriations Committee opining that contractor workers and their families "should not be penalized for a government shutdown that they did nothing to cause" while noting that there were bills in both chambers of Congress that if enacted would provide back pay to compensate contractor employees for lost wages before urging the Appropriations Committee "to include back pay for contractor employees in a supplemental appropriations bill for FY2019 or as part of the regular appropriations process for FY2020."

==== Trade ====
In June 2019, along with Bob Menendez, Tom Cotton, and Marco Rubio, Gillibrand introduced the Equitable Act, a bill that would increase oversight of Chinese and other foreign companies that were listed on American exchanges along with delisting noncompliant firms for three years.

==== Health care ====
Gillibrand voted in favor of the Patient Protection and Affordable Care Act (Obamacare), the Senate's version of health care reform legislation, and also supported the public option, which did not make it into the bill.

New York Governor David Paterson and New York City Mayor Michael Bloomberg called the Affordable Care Act a "disgrace," because it gave more money under Medicaid to states like Nebraska, whose senator, Democrat Ben Nelson, held out for more financial support as a condition of voting for the bill. New York State, in contrast, would have a $5.5 billion cut over 10 years. Bloomberg said it would force New York City to close 100 health clinics, would create a $1 billion hole in New York State's budget, and threaten the existence of struggling hospitals, nursing homes and other facilities, and called Gillibrand to complain.

Gillibrand said that the problem is that there are more small states in the Senate, so funding formulas tend to favor small states, and New York only gets 79 cents back for every dollar it sends to Washington. The formulas were more favorable to New York in the House, so she and Sen. Chuck Schumer (D-NY) were trying to get the final bill closer to the House version in the Conference Committee.

Gillibrand said that the bill would be a net benefit for New York because it would bring in $40 billion to the state, insure 2.7 million New Yorkers, increase the use of preventative care by requiring that it is covered, and give tax credits to 250,000 small businesses to help them afford health care coverage.

In September 2017, Gillibrand joined Bernie Sanders and 14 other co-sponsors in submitting a single-payer health care plan to Congress called the "Medicare for All" bill. The plan also covers vision and dental care, not currently covered by Medicare.

In November 2018, amid an increase in cases of acute flaccid myelitis, Gillibrand held a press conference declaring it was "good news" that the Centers for Disease Control and Prevention had announced the formation of a task force to research acute flaccid myelitis before tracking it and called on Congress "to make sure they have the funding they need to get the job done."

In December 2018, Gillibrand was one of 42 senators to sign a letter to Trump administration officials Alex Azar, Seema Verma, and Steve Mnuchin arguing that the administration was improperly using Section 1332 of the Affordable Care Act to authorize states to "increase health care costs for millions of consumers while weakening protections for individuals with pre-existing conditions." The senators requested the administration withdraw the policy and "re-engage with stakeholders, states, and Congress."

In January 2019, during the 2018–19 United States federal government shutdown, Gillibrand was one of 34 senators to sign a letter to Food and Drugs Commissioner Scott Gottlieb recognizing the efforts of the FDA to address the effect of the government shutdown on the public health and employees while remaining alarmed "that the continued shutdown will result in increasingly harmful effects on the agency’s employees and the safety and security of the nation’s food and medical products."

In February 2019, Gillibrand and 22 other Democratic senators introduced the State Public Option Act, a bill that would authorize states to form a Medicaid buy-in program for all residents and thereby grant all denizens of the state the ability to buy into a state-driven Medicaid health insurance plan if they wished. Brian Schatz, a bill cosponsor, said the legislation would "unlock each state’s Medicaid program to anyone who wants it, giving people a high-quality, low-cost public health insurance option" and that its goal was "to make sure that every single American has comprehensive health care coverage."

In June 2019, Gillibrand was one of eight senators to cosponsor the Territories Health Equity Act of 2019, legislation that would remove the cap on annual federal Medicaid funding and increase federal matching rate for Medicaid expenditures of territories along with more funds being provided for prescription drug coverage to low-income seniors in an attempt to equalize funding for American territories Puerto Rico, the Virgin Islands, Guam, American Samoa and the Northern Mariana Islands with that of U.S. states.

In June 2019, Gillibrand was one of 15 senators to introduce the Affordable Medications Act, legislation intended to promote transparency through mandating pharmaceutical companies disclose the amount of money going toward research and development in addition to both marketing and executives' salaries. The bill also abolished the restriction that stopped the federal Medicare program from using its buying power to negotiate lower drug prices for beneficiaries and hinder drug company monopoly practices used to keep prices high and disable less expensive generics entering the market.

==== Housing ====
In April 2019, Gillibrand was one of 41 senators to sign a bipartisan letter to the housing subcommittee praising the U.S. Department of Housing and Urban Development's Section 4 Capacity Building program as authorizing "HUD to partner with national nonprofit community development organizations to provide education, training, and financial support to local community development corporations (CDCs) across the country" and expressing disappointment that President Trump's budget "has slated this program for elimination after decades of successful economic and community development." The senators wrote of their hope that the subcommittee would support continued funding for Section 4 in Fiscal Year 2020.

=== Security ===
==== Terrorism ====
Gillibrand has co-sponsored legislation restoring habeas corpus for detainees in the War on Terror. In 2011, she voted for extending provisions of the Patriot Act. She also voted for the NDAA of 2012. Gillibrand also supports closing Guantanamo Bay but, together with Senator Schumer (also of New York), vehemently opposed plans to try those accused of coordinating the 9/11 attacks in New York federal court.

==== Immigration ====
Gillibrand's views on illegal immigration have shifted since she joined the Senate. Noted for having relatively conservative viewpoints while in the House, she quickly switched some opinions upon entering the Senate.

As a Representative, Gillibrand opposed granting any sort of amnesty to illegal immigrants and supported empowering local police to enforce federal immigration laws. She also opposed giving federal contracts to employers that hire illegal immigrants and supported increasing the number of border patrol agents. She was a co-sponsor of the SAVE Act, which aimed to increase the number of border guards, increase surveillance, and hasten deportations. Breaking with former New York Governor Eliot Spitzer, Gillibrand opposed his plan to issue drivers licenses to illegal immigrants. She also voted in favor of legislation targeting and withholding federal funds from sanctuary cities. Americans for Better Immigration, an immigration reduction lobby, graded Gillibrand at a B.

Following her appointment to the Senate, Gillibrand's positions were criticized by immigration advocates and Democratic elected officials, especially in New York. She subsequently changed some of her positions, explaining that "it’s a case of learning more and expanding my view." She now opposes deporting illegal immigrants and cutting off funds to sanctuary cities. She also supports an earned path to citizenship for illegal immigrants. In 2010 she was a co-sponsor of the DREAM Act, which would have provided pathway to citizenship for undocumented immigrants who arrived under the age of 16, complete at least 2 years of college or 2 years of military service and are under age of 35 at the time of enactment; the proposal was subsequently filibustered in the Senate in December 2010. She also supports a moratorium on home raids until comprehensive immigration reform is passed.

In 2018, Gillibrand announced that she was in favor of abolishing ICE, making her the first US senator to do so. She called for a "new agency with a very different mission," one that "separate[d] the criminal justice from the immigration issues."

In August 2018, Gillibrand was one of 17 senators to sign a letter spearheaded by Kamala Harris to Secretary of Homeland Security Kirstjen Nielsen demanding that the Trump administration take immediate action in attempting to reunite 539 migrant children with their families, citing each passing day of inaction as intensifying "trauma that this administration has needlessly caused for children and their families seeking humanitarian protection."

In November 2018, Gillibrand was one of 11 senators to sign a letter to Secretary of Defense James Mattis concerning "the overt politicization of the military" with the Trump administration's deployment of 5,800 troops to the U.S.-Mexico border and requesting a briefing and written justification from the U.S. Northern Command for troop deployment while urging Mattis to "curb the unprecedented escalation of DOD involvement in immigration enforcement."

In January 2019, Gillibrand was one of 20 senators to sponsor the Dreamer Confidentiality Act, a bill imposing a ban on the Department of Homeland Security (DHS) from passing information collected on DACA recipients to Immigration and Customs Enforcement (ICE), Customs and Border Protection (CBP), the Department of Justice, or any other law enforcement agency with exceptions in the case of fraudulent claims, national security issues, or non-immigration related felonies being investigated.

In February 2019, Gillibrand was one of 16 senators to vote against legislation preventing a partial government shutdown and containing 1.375 billion for barriers along the U.S.-Mexico border that included 55 miles of fencing.

In March 2019, Gillibrand voted to block President Trump's national emergency declaration that would have granted him access to $3.6 billion in military construction funding to build border barriers.

In April 2019, Gillibrand signed a letter led by Catherine Cortez Masto to Immigrations and Customs Enforcement and Customs and Border Enforcement asserting that "the civil detention of an expectant mother for potential immigration offenses is never justified" due to the "absence of compelling evidence that the detention of a pregnant woman is necessary because she is a threat to herself or others, or is a threat to public safety or national security". The senators requested the CBP enact measures that would ensure "timely and appropriate treatment" for pregnant women in custody along with both agencies providing information on how available facilities and doctors are for pregnant immigrants and complete data on the number of those currently in custody.

In April 2019, Gillibrand was one of six Democratic senators to sign a letter to Acting Defense Secretary Patrick M. Shanahan expressing concern over memos by Marine Corps Gen. Robert Neller in which Neller critiqued deployments to the southern border and funding transfers under President Trump's national emergency declaration as having posed an "unacceptable risk to Marine Corps combat readiness and solvency" and noted that other military officials had recently stated that troop deployment did not affect readiness. The senators requested Shanahan explain the inconsistencies and that Shanahan provide both "a staff-level briefing on this matter within seven days" and an explanation on how he would address Neller's concerns.

In April 2019, Gillibrand was one of 19 senators to sign a letter to top members on the Appropriations Committee Richard Shelby and Patrick Leahy and top members of its Homeland Security subcommittee Shelley Moore Capito and Jon Tester indicating that they could not "support the appropriation of funds that would expand this administration’s unnecessarily cruel immigration enforcement policies, its inhumane immigrant detention systems, or its efforts to build the president’s vanity projects" and urging Congress to "resist efforts to raid critical and effective public safety programs in order to pay for political theatrics" as President Trump's "manufactured emergency" was not justification for "spending taxpayer dollars on an ineffective wall."

Gillibrand told Margaret Brennan in May 2019 that she would not use detention system for immigrants if elected president, citing that immigrants would follow the process granted to them as they did when immigration cases were handled by the Justice Department and that she would "fund the border security measures that are anti-terrorism, anti-human trafficking, anti-drug trafficking and anti-gun trafficking."

In June 2019, following the Housing and Urban Development Department's confirmation that DACA recipients did not meet eligibility for federally backed loans, Gillibrand and eleven other senators introduced The Home Ownership Dreamers Act, legislation that mandated that the federal government was not authorized to deny mortgage loans backed by the Federal Housing Administration, Fannie Mae, Freddie Mac, or the Agriculture Department solely due to the immigration status of an applicant.

In July 2019, along with Kamala Harris and Amy Klobuchar, Gillibrand sent a letter to the Office of Refugee Resettlement asserting that the agency "should be prioritizing reunification of every child as soon as possible, but instead it has been responsible for policies that are forcing longer stays in government custody for children" and that it was mandatory that the office "ensure that the custody and processing of [unaccompanied migrant children] is meeting the minimum standards required by domestic and international law."

In July 2019, Gillibrand and 15 other Senate Democrats introduced the Protecting Sensitive Locations Act which mandated that ICE agents get approval from a supervisor ahead of engaging in enforcement actions at sensitive locations with the exception of special circumstances and that agents receive annual training in addition to being required to report annually regarding enforcement actions in those locations.

==== Internet privacy ====
Gillibrand was a co-sponsor of the controversial PROTECT IP Act, which would restrict access to web sites judged to be infringing copyrights.

On January 18, 2012, the NY Tech Meetup and other cybertech organizations held a demonstration with 2,000 protesters in front of the offices of Gillibrand and Charles Schumer, New York's other senator, who also supported the bill. Some demonstrators complained that the bill had originated with wealthy campaign contributors who would reward legislators for passing the bill. Gillibrand received $611,141 in campaign contributions from the "TV/Movies/Music" industry according to OpenSecrets.org.

On her Facebook page, Gillibrand said that she would "work to strike a balance between ending online piracy to protect New York jobs & ensuring Internet freedom so our tech community can continue to flourish."

==== Net neutrality ====
In May 2014, days before the FCC was scheduled to rewrite its net neutrality rules, Gillibrand was one of eleven senators to sign a letter to FCC Chairman Tom Wheeler charging Wheeler's proposal with destroying net neutrality instead of preserving it and urged the FCC to "consider reclassifying Internet providers to make them more like traditional phone companies, over which the agency has clear authority to regulate more broadly."

In March 2018, Gillibrand was one of ten senators to sign a letter spearheaded by Jeff Merkley which lambasted a proposal from FCC Chairman Ajit Pai that would curb the scope of benefits from the Lifeline program, which provided access to high-speed internet to roughly 6.5 million people in poor communities, citing that it was Pai's "obligation to the American public, as the Chairman of the Federal Communications Commission, to improve the Lifeline program and ensure that more Americans can afford access, and have means of access, to broadband and phone service".

In May 2018, Gillibrand voted for a bill that would reinstate net neutrality rules and thereby overturn the FCC's repeal via a law authorizing Congress to reverse regulatory actions by a simple majority vote.

=== Government ===
Gillibrand expressed support for preserving the Senate filibuster during an interview in 2019, saying it's "useful" because it encourages bipartisan consensus seeking, and saying "if you’re not able to get 60 votes on something, it just means you haven’t worked hard enough, talking to enough people and trying to listen to their concerns and then coming up with a solution that they can support [...] it just means you haven’t done enough advocacy and you need to work a lot harder".

==== Campaign finance ====
Gillibrand opposed the Supreme Court Decision in Citizens United and supports the DISCLOSE Act.

In January 2016, Gillibrand was one of 29 senators to sign a letter to President Obama urging him to issue a final executive order that would require federal contractors to disclose political donations, arguing that form of disclosure was "a modest step that would expose an especially troubling type of secret money: campaign contributions that have the potential to influence government contracting practices."

==== Ethics ====
Gillibrand made ethics a central theme of her campaign in 2010, outlining a 4-part plan for reform:

- Make Federal Funding Requests Fully Transparent
  - An earmark database
- Reduce Corporate Special Interest Influence on Elections
  - If a corporation wants to run an advertisement during a political campaign, the CEO would have to appear at the end of the ad and approve the message.
  - If an advocacy organization is behind the ad, the head of the organization, and whoever is funding the ad would have to appear in the ad and approve it. They would also have to list the top five funders paying for the ad.
  - Foreign-owned companies would be banned from spending unlimited sums of money through their U.S.-based subsidiaries.
  - No company with government contracts with over $50,000 could spend money on elections, and no company taking any taxpayer-funded assistance, such as TARP money, could spend money on elections.
- End Automatic Congressional Pay Raises
- Ban Anonymous Holds on Legislation

==== Stock Trading ====
In 2026, Gillibrand, along with Senator Ashley Moody, introduced a bipartisan bill that would prohibit congressional members and their immediate family members from owning or trading individual stocks. The Restore Trust in Congress Act would give congressional members 180 days to divest current individual stocks, and 90 days for newly elected congressional members.

==== Transparency ====
Gillibrand's office has published a "Sunlight Report" since she began her tenure as a member of the House. This document compiles her financial report as well as all meetings and earmark requests. She also pledged as a House member to accept no lobbyist gifts. In May 2010, she cosponsored the Earmark Transparency Act of 2010, which would require hosting of earmark requests online and limit discussion on those requests until they were posted.

=== Other ===
- She was the only senator to vote against the confirmation of James Mattis as Secretary of Defense. The vote was held a few hours after Donald Trump was sworn in as president on Jan. 20, 2017. The Senate vote was 98–1 in favor of confirmation.
- She opposes the No Child Left Behind Act because she believes it "places an unmanageable strain on county and school budgets".
- She supports doubling the Child and Dependent Care Credit, and eliminating or permanently fixing the Alternative Minimum Tax.
- She supports a moratorium on the death penalty.
- On June 20, 2008, Congresswomen Gillibrand voted for the FISA Amendments Act of 2008.
- In June 2012, Gillibrand urged a blanket ban on all neodymium magnet toys in a letter to U.S. Consumer Product Safety Commission Chairwoman Inez Tenenbaum, citing serious injuries to children who swallowed them. Critics objected to these restrictions on libertarian grounds.
- In August 2013, Gillibrand was one of 23 Democratic senators to sign a letter to the Defense Department warning of some payday lenders "offering predatory loan products to service members at exorbitant triple digit effective interest rates and loan products that do not include the additional protections envisioned by the law" and asserting that service members along with their families "deserve the strongest possible protections and swift action to ensure that all forms of credit offered to members of our armed forces are safe and sound."
- In December 2018, Gillibrand was one of 21 senators to sign a letter to U.S. Veterans Affairs Secretary Robert Wilkie calling it "appalling that the VA is not conducting oversight of its own outreach efforts" in spite of suicide prevention being the VA's highest clinical priority and requesting Wilkie "consult with experts with proven track records of successful public and mental health outreach campaigns with a particular emphasis on how those individuals measure success."
- In April 2019, Gillibrand was one of six senators to send a letter to Director of the CFPB Kathy Kraninger expressing concern "CFPB leadership has abandoned its supervision and enforcement activities related to federal student loan servicers" and opined that such behavior displayed "a shocking disregard for the financial well-being of our nation's public servants, including teachers, first responders, and members of the military." The senators requested that Kraninger clarify the role of the CFPB in overseeing the Public Service Loan Forgiveness's student loan servicers handling since December 2017 such as examinations made by the CFPB.
- In April 2019, Gillibrand was one of 12 Democratic senators to sign a letter led by Mazie Hirono that questioned the decision of Attorney General William Barr to offer "his own conclusion that the President’s conduct did not amount to obstruction of justice" and called for both the Justice Department's inspector general and the Office of Professional Responsibility to launch an investigation into whether Barr's summary of the Mueller Report and his April 18 news conference were misleading.

== Environmental policy ==
In September 2018, Gillibrand was one of eight senators to sponsor the Climate Risk Disclosure Act, a bill described by cosponsor Elizabeth Warren as using "market forces to speed up the transition from fossil fuels to cleaner energy — reducing the odds of an environmental and financial disaster without spending a dime of taxpayer money."

In November 2018, Gillibrand was one of 25 Democratic senators to cosponsor a resolution specifying key findings of the Intergovernmental Panel On Climate Change report and National Climate Assessment. The resolution affirmed the senators' acceptance of the findings and their support for bold action toward addressing climate change.

In February 2019, in response to reports of the EPA intending to decide against setting drinking water limits for perfluorooctanesulfonic acid (PFOS) and perfluorooctanoic acid (PFOA) as part of an upcoming national strategy to manage the aforementioned class of chemicals, Gillibrand was one of twenty senators to sign a letter to Acting EPA Administrator Andrew R. Wheeler calling on the agency "to develop enforceable federal drinking water standards for PFOA and PFOS, as well as institute immediate actions to protect the public from contamination from additional per- and polyfluoroalkyl substances (PFAS)."

In June 2019, Gillibrand was one of forty-four senators to introduce the International Climate Accountability Act, legislation that would prevent President Trump from using funds in an attempt to withdraw from the Paris Agreement and directing the president's administration to instead develop a strategic plan for the United States that would allow it to meet its commitment under the Paris Agreement.

== Foreign policy ==
=== Afghanistan ===
In 2011, Gillibrand called for an immediate withdrawal of U.S. troops from Afghanistan. She stated that "America cannot afford an endless war in Afghanistan".

In August 2017, after President Trump gave an address recommitting the United States to involvement in Afghanistan, Gillibrand assailed the address for lacking "in details, lacking in substance and lacking in a vision of what success in Afghanistan looks like."

In a December 2019 interview with NCPR, Gillibrand said of White House officials and military leaders that testify on Capitol Hill about Afghanistan and other missions, "they're not being frank, they're not being direct and they're not being clear." She asserted their lack of transparency had led "Congress to keep spending billions and billions of dollars putting our men and women's lives on the line for missions that perhaps aren't working, for strategies that are ineffective."

=== Central America ===
In April 2019, Gillibrand was one of 34 senators to sign a letter to President Donald Trump encouraging him "to listen to members of your own Administration and reverse a decision that will damage our national security and aggravate conditions inside Central America", asserting that President Trump had "consistently expressed a flawed understanding of U.S. foreign assistance" since becoming president and that he was "personally undermining efforts to promote U.S. national security and economic prosperity" through preventing the use of Fiscal Year 2018 national security funding. The senators argued that foreign assistance to Central American countries created less migration to the U.S., citing the funding's helping to improve conditions in those countries.

=== China ===
In May 2019, Gillibrand was a cosponsor of the South China Sea and East China Sea Sanctions Act, a bipartisan bill reintroduced by Marco Rubio and Ben Cardin that was intended to disrupt China's consolidation or expansion of its claims of jurisdiction over both the sea and air space in disputed zones in the South China Sea.

=== Cuba ===
In 2015 Gillibrand supported lifting the travel ban on Cuba.

=== Iran ===
In 2010, she supported and voted for sanctions against Iran.

In July 2017, Gillibrand voted in favor of the Countering America's Adversaries Through Sanctions Act that grouped together sanctions against Iran, Russia and North Korea. In June 2019, Gillibrand criticized Trump's administration for escalating tensions with Iran. Gillibrand's spokesperson said it would be illegal for the Trump administration to rely on a 2001 law that authorized the use of U.S. Armed Forces against those responsible for the September 11 attacks and any "associated forces".

After the January 2020 airstrike that killed General Qasem Soleimani, Gillibrand accused Trump of ordering "military action that may precipitate another armed conflict in the Middle East" without either seeking congressional authorization or a clear strategy.

Gillibrand criticized the June 2025 military strikes on Iran's nuclear facilities for lacking congressional approval and expressed gratitude for no US service members being harmed during the operation.

After a February 2026 Tomahawk missile strike on the Shajarah Tayyebeh elementary school building in Minab killed mostly children, Gillibrand told Wolf Blitzer that she wanted to know what Defense Secretary Pete Hegseth knew about the strike, noted the lack of a hearing on the Iran conflict by the Armed Services Committee, and opined that Hegseth "should resign because of this failure in being more precise." During an April 2026 press conference introducing a war powers resolution, Gillibrand said, "The American people will not stand for this kind of presidency and this war. He doesn’t have a strategy. He is reckless, and quite frankly, he is insane." Gillibrand grilled Admiral Brad Cooper when he testified before the Armed Services Committee, during which she asked for a report from him and his team about the destruction of the schools and healthcare facilities. On May 15, Gillibrand attributed the rise in gas prices to the Iran war and noted Trump's campaign promises to lower prices and seek peace. She accused Trump of not telling "the American people why we are there or how it is making us safer, and he is spending $1 billion a day on bombs that this community and this country would rather he spend on healthcare or affordability or getting gas prices down.”

=== Iraq ===
On May 24, 2007, Gillibrand joined with Republicans in voting against the Democratic leadership for a bill to provide funding for U.S. efforts in Iraq without setting withdrawal deadlines for troops. Of the five freshman Democratic members of Congress from New York in 2007, Gillibrand was the only one to vote yes. In 2008, she once again voted to provide funding for the Iraq War and again was the only New York Democratic congressional delegate to vote with the Republicans. She later voted against the Iraq surge and supported a timeline for withdrawal from Iraq.

=== Israel ===
Gillibrand's website states "Specifically, Senator Gillibrand will continue to strengthen America's close relationship with the State of Israel." She voted for S.CON.RES.23 of 2011–2012, which was "A concurrent resolution declaring that it is the policy of the United States to support and facilitate Israel in maintaining defensible borders and that it is contrary to United States policy and national security to have the borders of Israel return to the armistice lines that existed on June 4, 1967."

In 2012, Gillibrand came out against Democrat Charles Barron, a candidate for the state's Eighth Congressional District, because she viewed him as anti-Israel. Barron compared Israel's treatment of Palestinians in Gaza to the Nazi's treatment of Jews. Her spokesman said "Any candidate who is anti-Israel does not share Senator Gillibrand's values," At the time, Politico wrote that Gillibrand was potentially facing a general election against Rep. Bob Turner (R-NY), "best known for winning a special election as something of a single-issue pro-Israel candidate."

In January 2016, Gillibrand was part of an all-Democratic congressional delegation that met with Prime Minister Benjamin Netanyahu during a trip to Israel. In December, Gillibrand urged President Obama to veto UN Security Council Resolution 2334, which condemned Israeli settlement building in the occupied Palestinian territories as a violation of international law.

In May 2017, Gillibrand co-sponsored the Israel Anti-Boycott Act (S.270), which made it a federal crime, punishable by a maximum sentence of 20 years imprisonment, for Americans to encourage or participate in boycotts against Israel and Israeli settlements in the occupied Palestinian territories if protesting actions by the Israeli government. This bill was criticized by the American Civil Liberties Union and other civil rights proponents including Amnesty International. In direct response to criticisms, Gillibrand said that she would urge changes to the bill so that it would only apply to companies, not individuals. In August 2017 she withdrew her support, and, in 2019, she ultimately voted against the legislation.

In 2022, amid heightened antisemitic attacks in New York, Gillibrand requested an additional $2 million for the US-Israel Homeland Security Program and $6 million for the US-Israel cybersecurity cooperation grant program.

In October 2023, Gillibrand urged Congress to allocate 500 million in funding for protection of synagogues, mosques, and other religious and nonprofit organizations. She said, "Anxiety levels are very high. Hate crimes have increased exponentially, and the targeting of Jewish people and antisemitic crimes has witnessed a sharp rise over the past year. They are very worried and are seeking support."

In January 2024, Gillibrand went with members of the Senate Intelligence Committee on a Middle East trip. She said her two goals for the trip were finding out the threat level of Hamas and what it would take to the end the war. In October, after Staten Island Advance asked Gillibrand about her position on the Israel-Hamas conflict, she replied, "I think the genocide accusation is inaccurate and inflammatory. I think people are rightly concerned about the loss of innocent life."

In a June 2025 appearance on The Brian Lehrer Show, Gillibrand was asked if she would hold New York mayoral candidate Zohran Mamdani accountable for "glorifying" Hamas. She answered that she would like to talk with him and called for Mamdani to condemn the phrase "globalize the intifada". Mamdani, who asserted the phrase had been purposefully misinterpreted to smear him and other Palestine supporters, spoke with Gillibrand in a call where they discussed the need to cool tensions on the issue of the Israel-Hamas war and she apologized for "not separating her own views from the radio show caller’s more clearly".

In April 2026, protestors led by the antiwar group Jewish Voice for Peace, which included whistleblower Chelsea Manning, actor Hari Nef and New York City Council Member Alexa Avilé, attempted to stage a sit-in inside Gillibrand and Schumer's offices in Manhattan in opposition to their support of the US selling bombs to Israel. The protestors were blocked by security, arrested, and loaded onto buses. Gillibrand was one of seven Democratic senators to join all Republicans in opposing a pair of resolutions that would have blocked sales of bulldozers and 1,000-pound bombs to Israel.

=== Libya ===
In 2011, Gillibrand supported limited American military action in Libya.

=== North Korea ===
In March 2018, Gillibrand stated that a potential meeting between President Trump and North Korean leader Kim Jong-un was "a positive step in the right direction because we're talking about engagement of diplomacy and political solutions as opposed to military ones" but that she was unsure if Trump would stay the course in negotiations.

Following the 2018 North Korea-United States summit in June, Gillibrand said, "I’m very grateful that President Trump is trying diplomacy as opposed to military action because that was what his first take was. So, I am grateful that he is making the effort to try diplomacy and to try to bring people together towards a peaceful resolution."

=== Russia and Ukraine ===
In December 2010, all senate Democrats including Gillibrand voted for the ratification of New START, a nuclear arms reduction treaty between the United States and Russian Federation obliging both countries to have no more than 1,550 strategic warheads as well as 700 launchers deployed during the next seven years along with providing a continuation of on-site inspections that halted when START I expired the previous year. It was the first arms treaty with Russia in eight years.

During December 2018, in response to President Trump's October announcement that he intended to withdraw the United States from the Intermediate-Range Nuclear Forces Treaty, Gillibrand was one of seven senators to cosponsor the Prevention of Arms Race Act of 2018, legislation prohibiting funding for a U.S. ground-launched or ballistic missile that had "a range of between 500 and 5,500 kilometers" until the administration provided a report meeting five specific conditions. Gillibrand also cosponsored this legislation when it was reintroduced by senator Jeff Merkley in the 116th United States Congress.

In December 2018, after U.S. Secretary of State Mike Pompeo announced the Trump administration was suspending its obligations in the Intermediate-Range Nuclear Forces Treaty in 60 days in the event that Russia continued to violate the treaty, Gillibrand was one of six senators to organize a letter expressing concern over the administration "now abandoning generations of bipartisan U.S. leadership around the paired goals of reducing the global role and number of nuclear weapons and ensuring strategic stability with America's nuclear-armed adversaries" and calling on President Trump to continue arms negotiations.

In March 2022, Gillibrand was part of a bipartisan group of senators that traveled to Poland and Germany for a meeting with military leaders and Ukrainian refugees. Gillibrand told a news conference the most important takeaway from the trip "was the deep level of desperation and urgency from the Ukrainian people, what they are feeling and what they are facing." She called the US's role in the conflict to assure allies of their commitment to Ukraine and to deter Russian actions that would widen the war.

=== Saudi Arabia ===
In June 2017, Gillibrand voted for a resolution by Rand Paul and Chris Murphy that would block President Trump's $510 million sale of precision-guided munitions to Saudi Arabia that made up a portion of the $110 billion arms sale Trump announced during his visit to Saudi Arabia the previous year.

In March 2019, Gillibrand was one of nine Democratic senators to sign a letter to Salman of Saudi Arabia requesting the release of human rights lawyer Waleed Abu al-Khair and writer Raif Badawi, women's rights activists Loujain al-Hathloul and Samar Badawi, and Dr. Walid Fitaih. The senators wrote, "Not only have reputable international organizations detailed the arbitrary detention of peaceful activists and dissidents without trial for long periods, but the systematic discrimination against women, religious minorities and mistreatment of migrant workers and others has also been well-documented."

=== Syria ===
In late August 2013 Gillibrand supported limited U.S. strikes against the Syrian Armed Forces after the Ghouta chemical attack, which she blamed on the Syrian government. The U.S. strikes ultimately did not occur.

=== United Nations ===
In July 2019, Gillibrand confirmed that as U.S. president she would seek the ratification of the Convention on the Elimination of All Forms of Discrimination Against Women, a United Nations treaty characterized as a global bill of rights for women, citing the importance of the US "to project our values & make sure the world knows we believe in women's equality."

=== Venezuela ===
In January 2019, following Juan Guaidó's self-declaration as interim President of Venezuela, a member of Gillibrand's staff told HuffPost that the senator supported recognizing Guaidó and imposing sanctions on the country but opposed military intervention.

After the January 2026 capture of Nicolas Maduro, Gillibrand said in a statement that the Trump administration would need to explain "why they would carry out this military operation to perform regime change without authorization by Congress and how the United States is going to 'run' Venezuela indefinitely without putting our service members in harm’s way." Gillibrand voted to advance the Venezuela War Powers Act. She charged the Trump administration with not presenting a "concrete plan to ensure peace and stability in Venezuela or in the Western Hemisphere for that matter" and expressed the view that Trump was making the US less safe as a result of the operation.
