= Tanya Tull =

Founder of Para Los Ninos in Los Angeles

Tanya Tull (born 1943) is a leading expert in family homelessness in America. In 1980 she founded Para Los Ninos (For the Children), in reaction to an article she read in the Los Angeles Times concerning children living in Skid Row hotels. Para Los Ninos began as a childcare center that blossomed into a full range family service center utilizing renovated warehouses in Skid Row, Los Angeles. Today Para Los Ninos also operates charter schools in Central Los Angeles.

In 1983 Tull co-founded L.A. Family Housing, a nonprofit that creates permanent housing and maintains emergency shelters. In 1988, she created and established two more nonprofit agencies: Beyond Shelter and A Community of Friends. A Community of Friends develops permanent supportive housing for the homeless mentally ill. “Housing first for families,” was Tull's mission statement for Beyond Shelter. Beyond Shelter became a workshop for social change and promoted the “housing first” approach for families nationally and internationally for the next two decades. The focus on helping families to relocate from shelters into rental housing as rapidly as possible introduced an innovation in the field at the time, represented today by Rapid Rehousing programs in the Helping Families Save Their Homes Act of 2009. In 2011, Tull founded Partnering for Change to: “ Promote and facilitate strategies in communities that ensure access to stable and adequate housing as the vital platform for child and family health and well-being.”

== Education ==
In 1964 Tull graduated with a B.A. from Scripps College with an additional teaching credential from the UCLA School of Education and Information Studies. From 2002 to 2008 Tull was as an adjunct professor for research at USC Suzanne Dworak-Peck School of Social Work. She served as a Senior Fellow at the UCLA Luskin School of Public Affairs 2005-2017. In 2009, she received an Ashoka Fellowship.

== Awards and honors ==
- 1983 Coro Public Affairs Award
- 1986 Distinguished Alumna of the Year for Community Service – Scripps College
- 1992 Honorary Doctorate in Social Sciences – Whittier College
- 1993 Coordinator for the Roundtable on Housing and Homelessness for the Clinton Transition Team.
- 1996 Committee Member on the U.S. National Preparatory Committee for the United Nations Conference on Human Settlements, Habitat II.
- 1996 Gleitsman National Citizen Activist Award from the Center for Public Leadership, Harvard Kennedy School, Harvard University.
- 2002 Mexican American Legal Defense and Educational Fund (MALDEF) – Community Service Award
