= Party City =

American party supply store chain

- Formerly: Party City Holdco, Inc.
- Type: Subsidiary
- Industry: Retail; Manufacturing; Distribution
- Predecessor: Party City Holdco, Inc.
- Founded: 1986; 40 years ago; in East Hanover Township, New Jersey, U.S.
- Founder: Steve Mandell
- Headquarters: Woodcliff Lake, New Jersey (original), United States
- Number of locations: 29 independently/franchise-owned stores (United States); 700+ shop-in-shop locations inside Staples stores (United States); 69 Canadian Tire-owned stores (Canada); 504 departments inside Canadian Tire stores (Canada); (2026)
- Area served: Worldwide
- Products: Party supplies; Balloons; Decorations; Tableware; Gift bags; Halloween costumes
- Brands: Party City; Halloween City; Toy City
- Services: Specialty retail; Franchising
- Parent: Ad Populum (United States; 2025–present); Canadian Tire (Canada; 2019–present)
- Divisions: United States – New Amscan PC LLC; Canada – Canadian Tire; Retail; Consumer Products Group
- Website: partycity.com partycity.ca partycity.com.mx

A former Party City store in Chattanooga, Tennessee

New AmScan PC LLC, formerly known as Party City Holdco Inc., is an American chain of party supply stores and shop-in-shop sections founded in 1986 by Steve Mandell in East Hanover, New Jersey. Party City's headquarters are in Woodcliff Lake, New Jersey. Party City was the largest retailer of party goods in Canada, Puerto Rico, and Mexico. Party City operated over 850 company-owned and franchise outlets in over 70 countries around the world under the Party City, Halloween City, Toy City, Factory Card and Party Outlet brands. In December 2024, Party City filed for Chapter 11 bankruptcy, laid off all administrative employees, and announced they would liquidate and close most remaining stores in the United States. As of 2025, stores not operated by Party City Holdco, such as those in Canada, Puerto Rico, and Hawaii, were unaffected and continue to operate.

== Retail history ==
Party City was founded by Steve Mandell in 1986. Mandell recognized that the market for party goods was highly fragmented, with many small mom-and-pop operations. He noticed that a large number of retailers carried limited supplies. Additionally, he saw that many big players were trying to dominate the party goods market. After scraping together $125,000, Mandell opened a 4,000 square feet (370 m^{2}) store in East Hanover, New Jersey, naming it Party City. The operation was immediately successful, and within a year, Mandell began planning for a second location. He also began to hear from people asking to franchise the Party City concept, and as a result, Party City began its evolution into a national chain. After his first year in business, Mandell also decided to concentrate on Halloween. In 1987, over a quarter of his store was turned into a "Halloween Costume Warehouse". The move proved highly successful and led to Party City's ongoing focus on the holiday, and the major impact that the month of October would have on Party City's bottom line. Year-round, Party City stocked an inventory of Halloween costumes for no reason other than to make customers aware of the items for the next Halloween season. One quarter ($560 million) of Party City's 2015 revenue came from Halloween; Halloween City operated about 300 Halloween City pop-up stores. Party City started franchising stores in 1989, with the first franchise store located in Hazlet, New Jersey. By 1990, Mandell also owned four Party City stores. At this point, he incorporated the business as a franchising operation, with his stores forming the core of the chain. By the end of 1990, Party City outlets numbered 11; five more franchised stores were added in 1991, 16 in 1992, and another 26 in 1993, bringing the total to 58. Party City was now a nationwide chain with store locations ranging from Hawaii to Puerto Rico. Party City's annual revenues in 1993 topped $2.4 million and net profits approached $235,000. During these first four years of operation, Mandell refined the Party City concept, including store design, product mix, choice of suppliers, and the implementation of systems. In late 1993, with a successful store model in hand, Mandell decided to de-emphasize franchising in favor of opening company-owned stores, which would generate greater returns for the corporation than it could receive on fees and royalties from franchised outlets, as well as allow Mandell to better control the destiny of Party City. While franchisees might maintain tighter inventory control, Mandell insisted that company-owned units would be amply stocked with a wide range of merchandise.

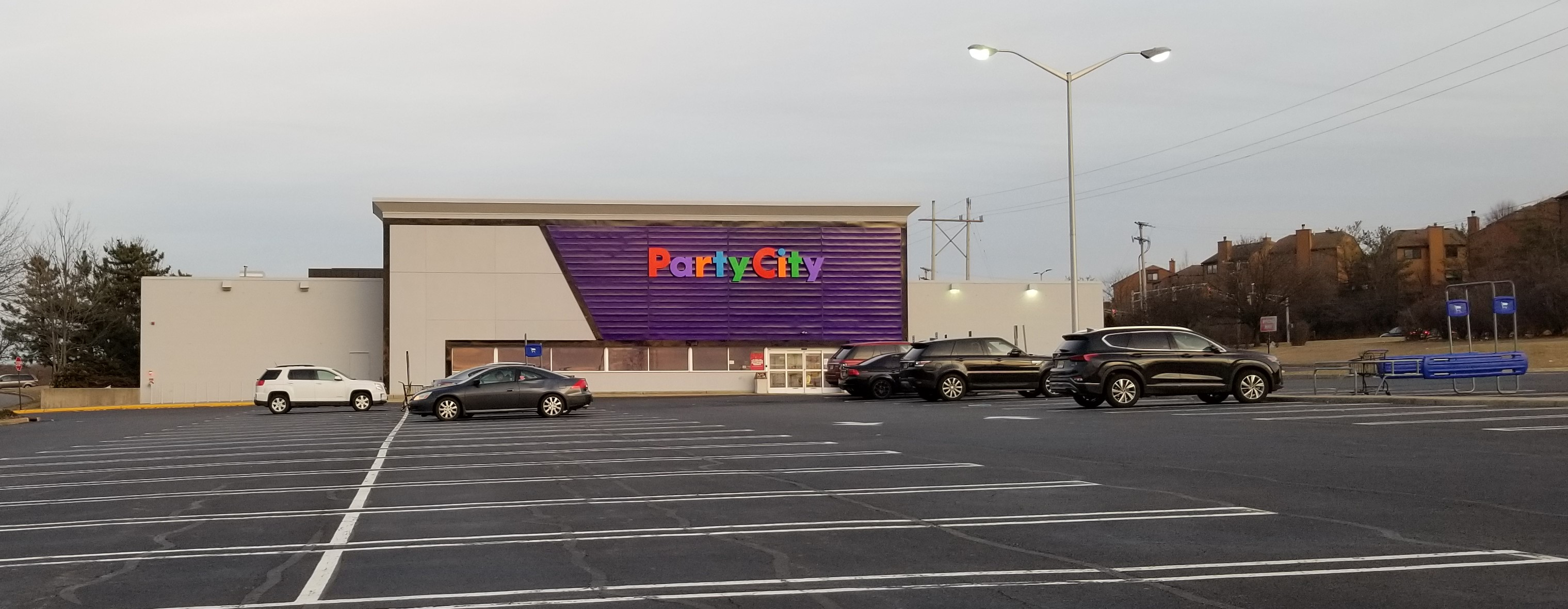
Party City in Rockaway, New Jersey

In 2005, Party City was sold to a subsidiary of AAH Holdings Corporation, owner of Amscan, a designer, manufacturer, and distributor of party goods in America. Amscan then went on to acquire the party retailers Party America in 2006 and Factory Card & Party Outlet in 2007. Both retail chains began to operate under the Party City network, thereby making Party City the largest party supplies retailer in the United States. With Amscan's 2011 acquisition of American Greetings' Designware party division, Party City added licensing agreements with Nickelodeon, Sesame Workshop, and Hasbro. In 2011, Amscan became a licensee for MLB, NBA, NFL, NHL, and NCAA party products and balloons, with Party City carrying all teams in their respective markets and offering the entire assortment in larger stores and online. In 2011, Party City expanded outside the United States with the acquisition of the Canadian retailer Party Packagers, making Party City the largest party goods retailer in North America. In 2012, these stores began to re-brand as Party City. In 2013, Party City bought iParty. In December 2017, Party City acquired MG Novelty Corporation for about $5.5 million; that Party City operated seven retail stores under the name Party Galaxy in the Oklahoma City metropolitan area. In 2017, Party City purchased its franchised locations in the Carolinas. In 2012, Advent International, Berkshire Partners LLC, and Weston Presidio sold a majority stake in Party City to Thomas H. Lee Partners. In 2015, Party City Holdco Inc. went public, with Thomas H. Lee Partners retaining 55% and Advent International owning 19 percent. In April 2017, a private equity firm approached Party City to acquire it. In response, Party City placed itself on the market.

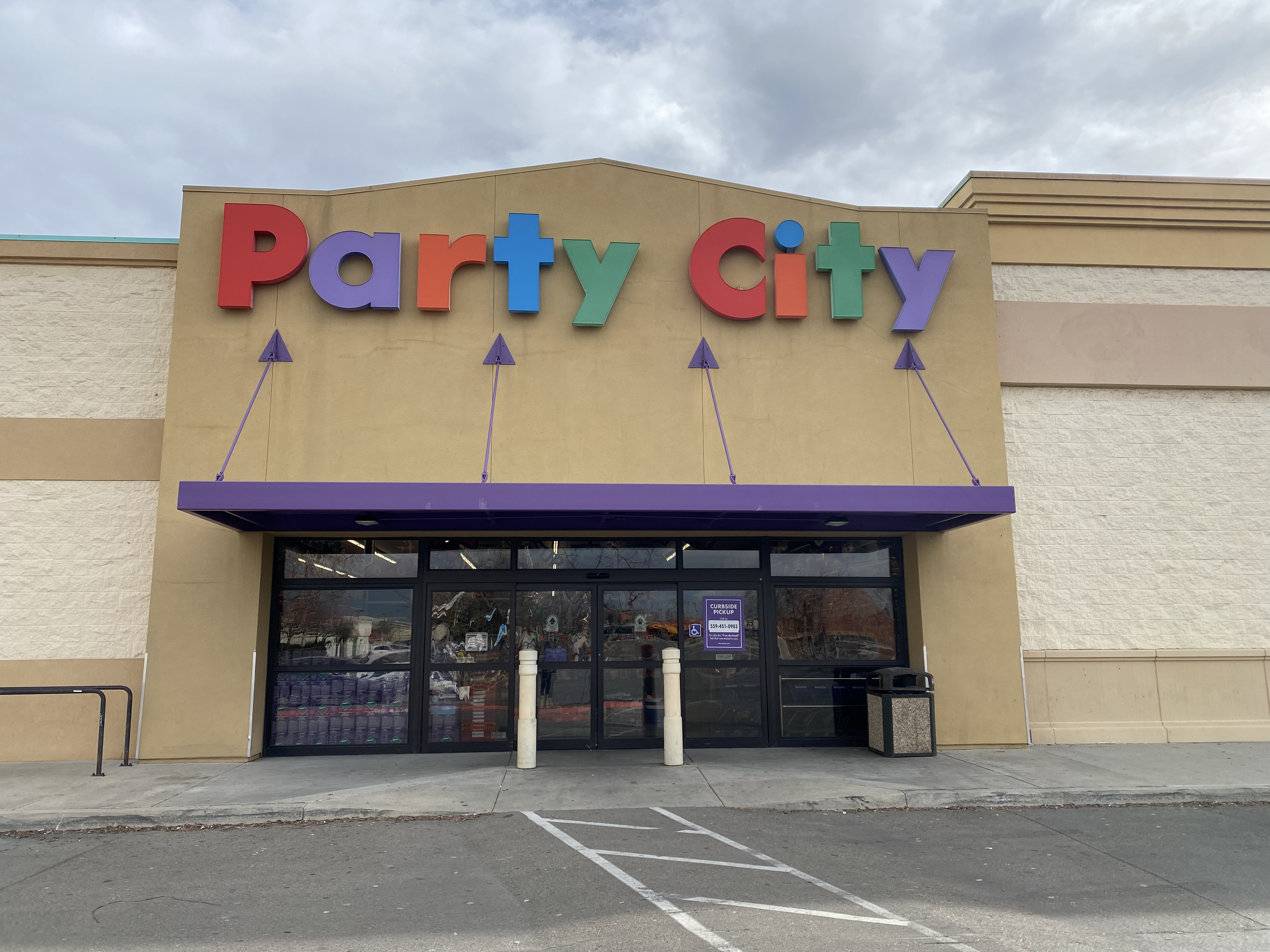
Party City store in Fresno, California

In June 2018, Party City announced that it would open around 50 Toy City pop-up stores beginning in September 2018, alongside its Halloween City stores. The stores operated through the conclusion of the holiday season and were meant to capitalize upon the closure of the U.S. locations of Toys "R" Us. Some of its locations used vacancies created by the Toys "R" Us shutdown. In May 2019, Party City announced that it would close 45 locations "to help optimize our market-level performance, focus on the most profitable locations, and improve the overall health of our store portfolio". In August 2019, Party City's Canadian operations were acquired by Canadian Tire for $174.4 million CAD. On January 17, 2023, Party City Holdco Inc. filed for Chapter 11 bankruptcy, weighed down by a confluence of factors including the COVID-19 pandemic and changing consumer behaviors. The move was part of an attempt to restructure and reduce Party City's debt. Party City secured $150 million in financing to keep its stores open and operations running. Party City said that the move would help it complete an "expedited restructuring" to reduce its debt, which should be done by the second quarter of 2023. On September 6, 2023, Party City officially announced they had completed their bankruptcy reorganization after a US judge approved their bankruptcy plans. Party City was able to eliminate over $1 billion of debt during the reorganization. Most of its stores were expected to stay open until 2025; however, a handful of its 800 stores had permanently shuttered by the end of 2023, notably underperforming and less productive locations, and stores in underdeveloped and obsolete areas.

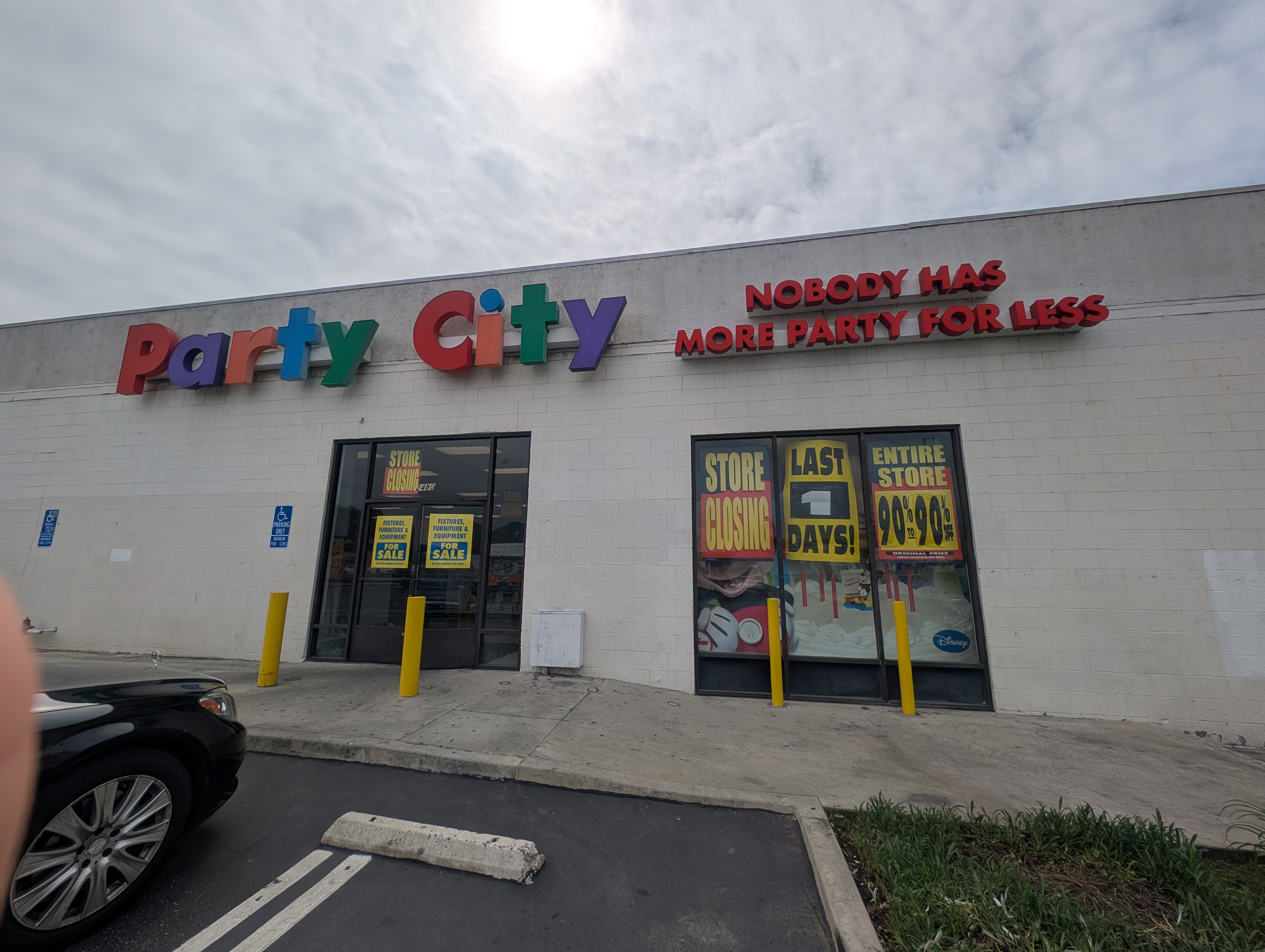
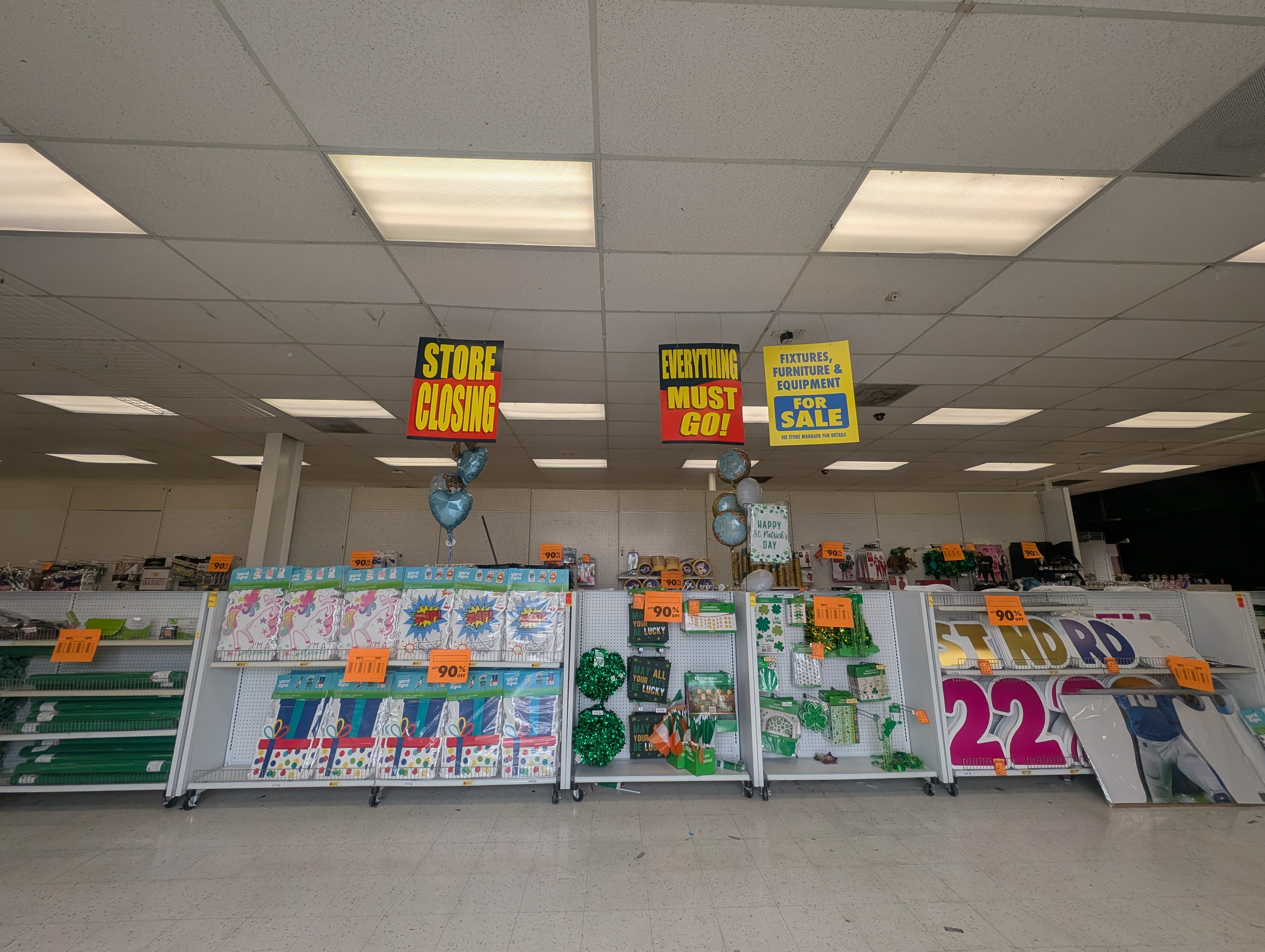
Exterior (top) and interior (bottom) of the Party City store on the last day of operation in West Los Angeles (March 27, 2025)

In December 2024, Party City warned that it would be preparing to file for bankruptcy for the second time in two years, as it was running out of cash to continue operating at several of its locations. Party City announced that it would close all of its corporate-owned US stores by February 28, 2025, as part of a winding-down procedure. Franchised locations not owned by Party City, as well as Canadian locations, will remain open, the latter of which is currently owned by Canadian Tire. On December 24, 2024, Party City reported that Mitch Modell, former CEO of Modell's Sporting Goods, was looking to buy Party City in an effort to save thousands of jobs. Modell planned to release financing sheets by the end of that week, but nothing further has been announced as of January 2025. Party City auctioned off leases for nearly 700 store locations across 45 states. By early 2025, these auctions had generated around $14.5 million. Among the top bidders for these store leases were Dollar Tree, which secured 150 leases, and Five Below, which acquired 40. Other participants in the bidding included Barnes & Noble, La-Z-Boy, and Rack Room Shoes. In addition to the physical assets, the intellectual property and wholesale business operations of Party City were sold to an affiliate of Ad Populum for $20 million. Ad Populum, known for products like the Chia Pet and The Clapper, now holds the rights to continue Party City's tradition in party goods manufacturing under the newly formed company New Amscan.

=== New ownership post-bankruptcy ===
As of June 2025, Party City's United States website was brought back into operation for online orders. In late 2025, it was announced that the US-based office supply store Staples would be launching a Party City store-within-a-store concept in its retail locations, similar to the Party City store-within-a-store concept that Canadian Tire has inside all of its department store locations.

In April 2026, Party City partnered with Staples to introduce Party City shop-in-shop sections at more than 700 Staples locations across the United States. The sections offer balloons, decorations, and other party supplies, alongside Staples' printing services for items such as invitations, banners, and signs. The companies announced plans to expand the Party City concept to additional Staples locations by the end of 2026.

== See also ==
- List of private equity owned companies that have filed for bankruptcy
- List of retailers affected by the retail apocalypse
