= 722 redemption =

Provision of United States bankruptcy law

722 Redemption is a process within the U.S. bankruptcy code under section 11 U.S.C. 722 that allows a debtor to redeem collateral based on the market value of the collateral. The bankruptcy code allows a debtor to pay the retail value of the collateral in a lump sum payment to the creditor in exchange for the lien on the collateral being released.

In order for 722 redemption to apply the item in question must be personal property intended primarily for personal, family or household use. The interest in the property must be exempted under the bankruptcy code or has to be abandoned by the bankruptcy estate in order for 722 redemption to be used. Once a bankruptcy case is filed a debtor must file a motion in court and obtain a court order to redeem the property. This process is most commonly used to redeem vehicles that are worth less than the outstanding loan on the vehicle. The process allows a debtor to pay the current market value of the vehicle versus the outstanding loan on the vehicle.
