= Helping Families Save Their Homes Act of 2009 =

- Other short titles: Homeless Emergency Assistance and Rapid Transition to Housing (HEARTH) Act of 2009 (as Division B)
- Long title: An Act To prevent mortgage foreclosures and enhance mortgage credit availability.
- Enacted by: the 111th United States Congress
- Effective: May 20, 2009 (upon signing)

Citations
- Public law: Pub. L. 111–22
- Statutes at Large: 123 Stat. 1632

Legislative history
- Introduced in the House of Representatives as H.R. 1106 (original version), S. 896 (final version) by John Conyers (H.R. 1106), Christopher J. Dodd (S. 896) on February 23, 2009 (H.R. 1106) April 27, 2009 (S. 896); Committee consideration by House Financial Services Committee, House Judiciary Committee, House Veterans' Affairs Committee (for H.R. 1106); Senate Committee on Banking, Housing and Urban Affairs (for S. 896); Passed the House on March 5, 2009 (H.R. 1106) (234–191 (H.R. 1106)); Passed the Senate on May 6, 2009 (S. 896) (91–5 (S. 896)) with amendment; Agreed to by the House on May 19, 2009 (amended S. 896) (367–54, 1 Present (amended S. 896)); Senate agreed to Senate amendment on May 19, 2009 (House amendment to S. 896) (Unanimous Consent (House amendment to S. 896)); Signed into law by President Barack Obama on May 20, 2009

The Helping Families Save Their Homes Act of 2009 (Pub. L. 111–22 (text) (PDF)) is an enacted public law in the United States. On May 20, 2009, the Senate bill was signed into law by President Barack Obama. The stated purpose of the act, a product of the 111th United States Congress, was to allow bankruptcy judges to modify mortgages on primary residences, among other purposes; however, that provision was dropped in the Senate and is not included in the version that was eventually signed into law. In addition, the bill amends the Hope for Homeowners Program as well as provide additional provisions to help borrowers avoid foreclosure.

On May 20, 2009, President Obama signed the Homeless Emergency Assistance and Rapid Transition to Housing (HEARTH) Act into law (Pub. L. 111–22 (text) (PDF)), reauthorizing HUD's Homeless Assistance programs. It was included as part of the Helping Families Save Their Homes Act of 2009. The HEARTH Act allows for the prevention of homelessness, rapid re-housing, consolidation of housing programs, and new homeless categories. In the eighteen months after the bill's signing, HUD must make regulations implementing this new McKinney program.

In late 2009, some homeless advocacy organizations, such as the National Coalition for the Homeless, reported and published perceived problems with the HEARTH Act of 2009 as a HUD McKinney-Vento Reauthorization bill, especially with regard to privacy, definitional ineligibility, community roles, and restrictions on eligible activities.

== Legislative history ==
In the wake of the bursting of the United States housing bubble and the collapse of the American subprime mortgage industry, this bill was introduced by Rep. John Conyers (D-Michigan) on February 23, 2009. It was then referred to the House Financial Services Committee, the House Judiciary Committee, and the House Veterans' Affairs Committee.

However, on February 25, the House passed a resolution, 224–198, which permitted the Speaker of the House to declare the House resolved into the Committee of the Whole House for exclusive consideration of the Helping Families Save Their Homes Act, waiving most points of order against consideration of the bill and all points of order against provisions of the bill.

On February 26, the House considered the bill under the provisions of the resolution passed the previous day, which provided for one hour of general debate. With Rep. José Serrano (D-New York) designated as chairman of the committee, the House debated the bill for one hour and then left it as unfinished business.

On March 5, the House voted to pass the bill, 234–191, with most Democrats supporting the bill and most Republicans opposing it.

The engrossed House legislation was referred to the Senate Committee on Banking, Housing and Urban Affairs on March 11, 2009. Similar legislation, S. 895 and S. 896 were both introduced on April 27, 2009, since then. On May 6, the Senate passed S.896 on a vote of 91–5. The key difference between H.R.1106 and S.896 is that the latter does not include a controversial cram down provision, which failed to garner majority support in the Senate. On May 19, the House approved an amended version of S. 896 by a 367–54 vote, with one member voting "present". The Senate promptly approved the House's amendment, and President Obama signed the bill into law the next day.

== Provisions ==
The Helping Families Save Their Homes Act will:

- Expand eligibility for Chapter 13 bankruptcy by excluding home mortgage debt from the current maximum debt limitations.
- Authorize the Secretary of Housing and Urban Development to pay out all or some of the balance owed on any Federal Housing Administration-insured loans that are modified under the legislation.
- Expand the HOPE for Homeowners program
- Provide a legal safe harbor from liability for lenders that enter into loan modifications or workouts with borrowers. (Under current law, lenders that have packaged and sold one or more mortgages to investors as securities may be held liable for losses suffered by the investor as a result of the loan modification.)
- Extend increased Federal Deposit Insurance Corporation (FDIC) and National Credit Union Administration (NCUA) deposit insurance limits until December 31, 2013. (The Emergency Economic Stabilization Act temporarily increased the FDIC and NCUA limits from $100,000 to $250,000 in 2008, but those increases were scheduled to expire on December 31, 2009.)

=== Cram down ===
H.R. 1106 contains a provision, frequently called "cram down," which would allow judges to modify the rights of a mortgage holder, whether that mortgage holder is a primary lender or an investor in a mortgage-backed security, with regard to delinquent mortgages on primary residences if the borrower has entered Chapter 13 bankruptcy proceedings. Among other modifications, the bill would allow bankruptcy judges to reduce the principal amount contractually owed by the borrower under the original mortgage. Proponents of cram down, chiefly Democrats, have cited studies saying that the provision could have helped 20% of homeowners facing foreclosures stay in their homes.

This provision drew extensive criticism because it would have allowed borrowers to abdicate their contractual obligation to repay the full amount of their loan. Many argued that cram down would have made it more costly for other individuals to purchase a home because lenders would have had to increase interest rates and down payments to supplement the loss from the loan modification. Opposition to cram down stalled H.R. 1106 and led to the introduction of S.896, which does not include cram down, in its place.

== See also ==
- Homelessness in the United States
- McKinney–Vento Homeless Assistance Act
