= Party store =

Retail store selling party supplies

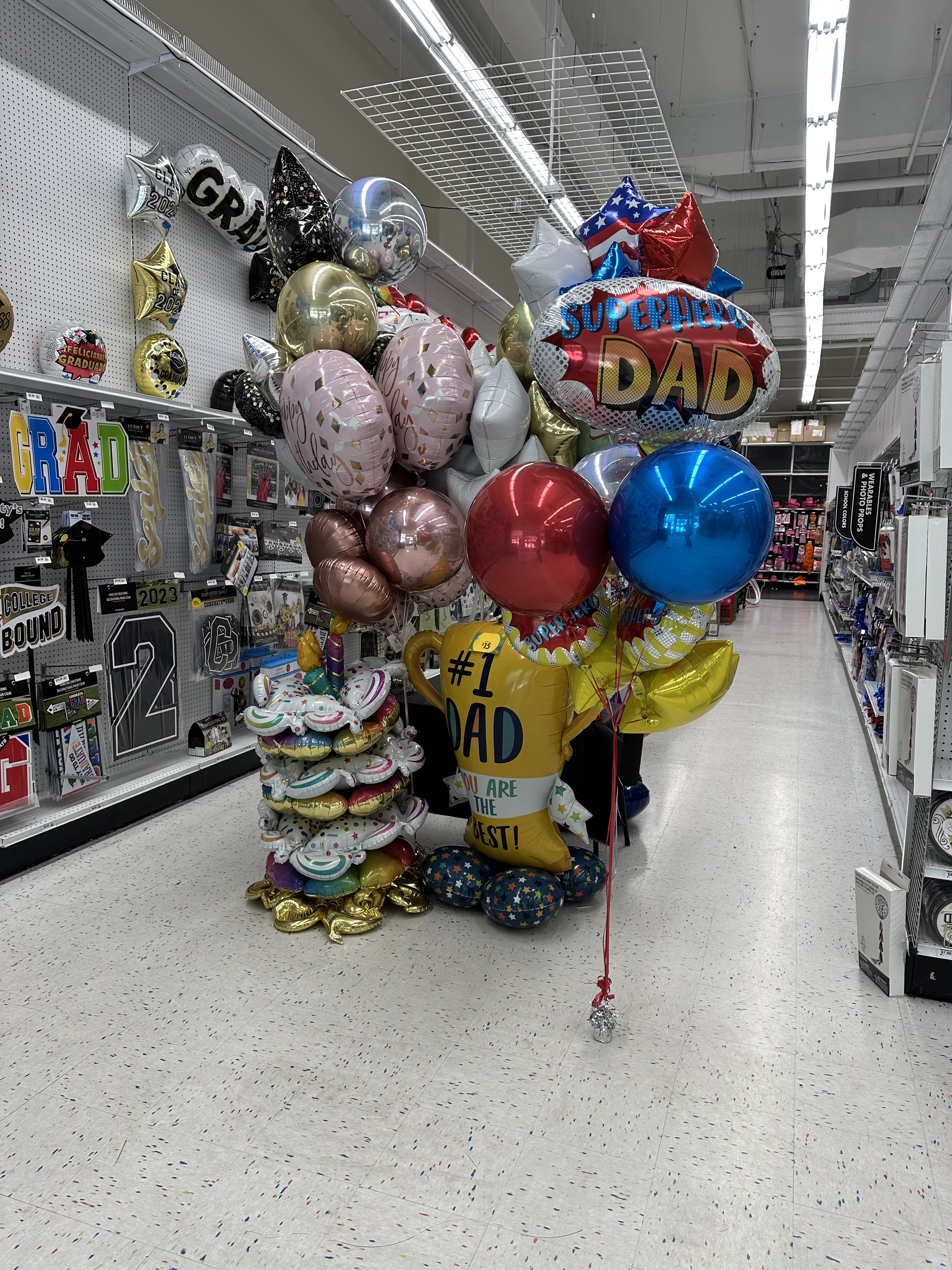
Interior of a party store

Specialist stores selling supplies for parties began developing in the late 1970s in the United States and rapidly expanded into the 1990s. They can offer a wide variety of products, and will often stock seasonal items for holidays—such as Christmas or New Year. Commonly stocked merchandise may include:

- Balloons and streamers
- Wrapping paper, greeting cards
- Cake decoration items
- Seasonal holiday items
- Candy and soft drinks
- Plates, utensils, cups (especially disposable ones for parties) and table decorations

In 2019 a global shortage of helium sharply reduced supply for helium-filled balloons, due to the US rationing helium because of a reduction in supply by 30% stemming from a Saudi-boycott of producer country Qatar, impacting party stores such as Party City, one of the reasons the company cited in closing 45 of its 870 stores.
