= List of private equity owned companies that have filed for bankruptcy =

The following private equity firm or hedge fund owned companies have filed for bankruptcy protection:

- A&P (grocery chain)
- At Home
- Big Lots
- Brookstone
- Claire's
- Envision Healthcare
- Friendly's
- GenesisCare
- Genesis HealthCare
- Hearthside Food Solutions - aka "H-Food Holdings LLC"
- Hooters
- Hudson's Bay Company
- Instant Brands (maker of Instant Pot and Pyrex)
- Joann
- Kmart
- On the Border Mexican Grill & Cantina
- Party City
- Payless Shoe Source
- Prospect Medical Holdings
- RadioShack
- Red Lobster
- RJR Nabisco
- Sears
- Sports Authority
- Sprinkles Cupcakes
- Steward Health Care
- TGI Fridays
- Thames Water
- The Limited
- Toys R Us
- True Value (hardware retailer)
- TWA
- Vice Media
- Wellpath
