= Cram down =

A cram down or cramdown is the involuntary imposition by a court of a reorganization plan over the objection of some classes of creditors.

== Home mortgage loans ==
While typically used in a corporate context, the phrase has gained popularity in the context of personal bankruptcies as a result of the subprime mortgage crisis. In the mortgage context, the term "cramdown" has a distinct meaning than in a chapter 11 corporate bankruptcy. Instead of referring to the confirmation of a plan over the objection of an impaired class of creditors, a mortgage cram-down refers to reducing the creditor's allowed secured claim to the value of the collateral property. This procedure, which is sometimes known as lien stripping or strip-down, has nothing to do with the plan confirmation process per se.

Under current United States law, bankruptcy courts are not allowed to perform cramdowns (i.e., reduce the principal amount or change the interest rate or other terms) on creditors who hold loans secured by mortgages on debtors' primary residences.

U.S. bankruptcy law provides for an automatic stay of any legal process against debtors or their assets (except perhaps legal process involving criminal law or family law) while bankruptcy is pending, but because U.S. bankruptcy courts cannot cram down loans secured by primary residences, creditors are able to file motions for relief from the stay. Once relief is granted, creditors may proceed with foreclosure immediately while debtors' other financial obligations await restructuring by the bankruptcy court. Debtors may eventually obtain discharges of their other debts, but by then, they may already have lost their homes.

=== Historical context ===
The prohibition on cramdowns on loans secured by primary residences was the result of a political compromise during the process of enacting the Bankruptcy Reform Act of 1978. At the time, Congress was confronted with brutal stagflation in which economic stagnation was combined with sky-high inflation and interest rates, which were severely frustrating the United States' long-term federal public policy of promoting homeownership (which goes back to the National Housing Act of 1934). Congress therefore decided to shield lenders on loans secured by primary residences from cramdowns because there was evidence that they perform "a valuable social service" through their loans.

Generally, under risk-based pricing, a rational lender will underwrite a loan with an interest rate that correlates directly to the borrower's credit risk. That is the risk that the lender cannot recover its entire expected return on investment, which in turn includes not only the probability of default, but also any external forces (like a bankruptcy court) that could delay repayment or force the lender to write off any part of the loan. The higher the risk, the higher the interest rate. Thus, Congress reasoned, if lenders knew their loans were protected from cramdowns, then they would offer loans at lower interest rates, which in turn would mean lower monthly payments, and thereby enable more Americans to afford homes. In plain English, Congress sacrificed the interests of the minority of borrower-homeowners who default on their loans for the sake of lowering the cost of homeownership for the majority of borrower-homeowners who successfully repay their loans.

This rule was fiercely litigated in the 1980s, but the prohibitions on cramdowns on primary residences in both Chapter 7 and Chapter 13 bankruptcy proceedings were eventually upheld by the U.S. Supreme Court in the early 1990s. Finding no relief in Chapters 7 or 13, some individual borrowers tried the creative move of filing under Chapter 11 (which is normally used by corporations). As a result, the home lending industry went back to Congress, which responded by extending the cramdown restriction for loans secured by primary residences to Chapter 11 with the Bankruptcy Reform Act of 1994.

=== Contemporary issues ===
As a potential solution to the subprime mortgage crisis, legislators and consumer advocates have advanced a proposal to allow cram downs on these loans, and legislation to that effect was introduced for potential inclusion in the Emergency Economic Stabilization Act of 2008.

However, the financial industry strongly voiced opposition to such a measure, claiming that it would create additional uncertainty as to the value of mortgage loans (and by extension, the collateralized debt obligations into which they are bundled). In addition, like in the late 1970s, the financial industry had powerful political leverage on its side: the risk that revoking the cramdown restriction would result in higher interest rates on home loans. It was impossible to simultaneously enact a law preventing the industry from jacking up interest rates on all home loans; that would have raised the possibility of bank runs, because few investors would keep their money at an institution that is legally prohibited from setting interest rates on its loans to accurately reflect the underlying credit risk. To prevent bank runs, Congress could have simultaneously imposed capital transfer restrictions, but that would have paralyzed the global economy. As few politicians wanted to be blamed by Wall Street for making homes unaffordable or causing even more bank failures or a second Great Depression, the proposals for revoking the prevention of cramdowns on loans secured by primary residences never found much traction in Congress.

== Early use of term ==
The term "cram down" in the reorganization context appears in case law as early as 1944.

== Informal use ==
The term (sometimes used in the phrase cram-down deal) has also gained currency to denote informally any transaction where existing investors (debt or equity) are forced by circumstance to accept an unappealing transaction, such as an expensive financing, a debt transaction that subordinates them, a dilutive equity raising, or an acquisition at an unappealingly low price.
