= 2026 United States Senate election in Massachusetts =

- November 3, 2026

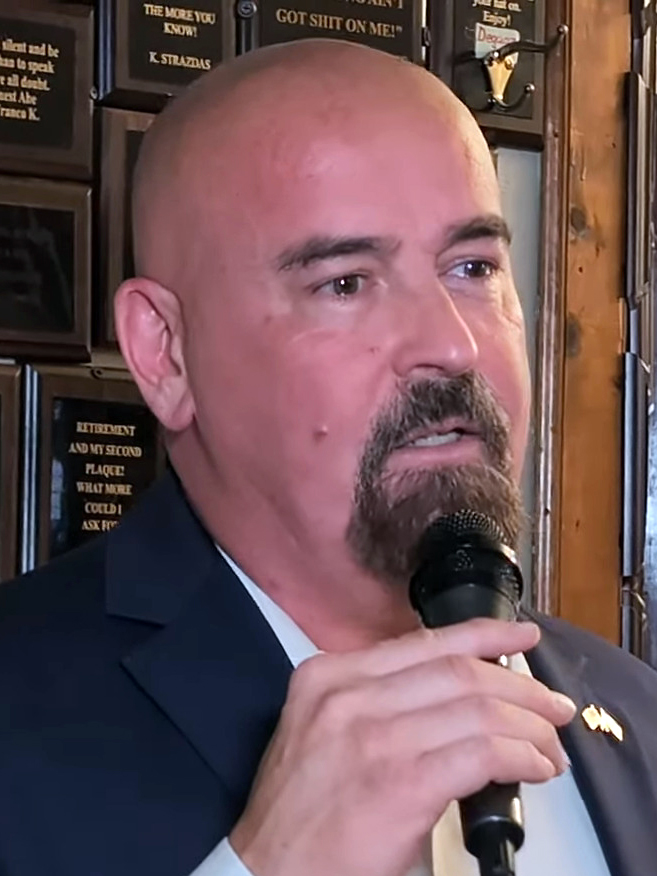
Nominee	Ed Markey	John Deaton
Party	Democratic	Republican
Popular vote	1,718,276	855,969
Percentage	63.68%	31.72%
- Markey: 40–50% 50–60% 60–70% 70–80% 80–90% 90–100% Deaton: 40–50% 50–60% No votes
U.S. senator before election
Ed Markey
Democratic
Elected U.S. senator
Ed Markey
Democratic

The 2026 United States Senate election in Massachusetts was held on November 3, 2026, to elect a member of the United States Senate to represent the Commonwealth of Massachusetts. Democratic incumbent Ed Markey was re-elected to a third full term, defeating Republican attorney John Deaton.

Primary elections were held on September 1. Markey won the Democratic nomination over Representative Seth Moulton with 64.9% of the vote. Deaton, the Republican nominee in 2024, was nominated a second time after running unopposed in the primary.

== Democratic primary ==
=== Candidates ===
==== Nominee ====
- Ed Markey, incumbent U.S. senator (2013–present)

==== Eliminated in primary ====
- Seth Moulton, U.S. representative from Massachusetts's 6th congressional district (2015–present) and candidate for president in 2020

==== Eliminated in convention ====
- William F. Gates Jr., professor and architect

==== Withdrawn ====
- Alex Rikleen, history teacher (endorsed Markey)

==== Declined ====
- Jake Auchincloss, U.S. representative for Massachusetts's 4th congressional district (2021–present) (running for re-election)
- Ayanna Pressley, U.S. representative for Massachusetts's 7th congressional district (2019–present) (running for re-election; endorsed Markey)

=== Endorsements ===
Ed Markey

U.S. senators

- Bernie Sanders, Vermont (2007–present) (Independent)
- Elizabeth Warren, Massachusetts (2013–present)

U.S. representatives

- Katherine Clark, House minority whip (2023–present) from MA-05 (2013–present)
- Bill Keating, MA-09 (2011–present)
- Jim McGovern, MA-02 (2013–present)
- Richard Neal, MA-01 (1989–present)
- Alexandria Ocasio-Cortez, NY-14 (2019–present)
- Lori Trahan, MA-03 (2019–present)
- Ayanna Pressley, MA-07 (2019–present)

Statewide officials

- Andrea Campbell, attorney general of Massachusetts (2023–present)
- Paul DePalo, governor's councilor from the 7th district (2021–present)

State legislators

- Michael Barrett, state senator from the 3rd Middlesex district (2013–present)
- William Brownsberger, president pro tempore of the Massachusetts Senate (2019–present) from the 2nd Suffolk and Middlesex district (2012–present)
- Nick Collins, state senator from the 1st Suffolk district (2018–present)
- Julian Cyr, state senator from the Cape and Islands district (2017–present)
- Sal DiDomenico, state senator from the Middlesex and Suffolk district (2010–present)
- Brandy Fluker-Reid, state representative from the 12th Suffolk district (2021–present)
- Homar Gomez, state representative from the 2nd Hampshire district (2025–present)
- Russell Holmes, state representative from the 6th Suffolk district (2011–present)
- Pat Jehlen, state senator from the 2nd Middlesex district (2005–present)
- Mary Keefe, state representative from the 15th Worcester district (2013–present)
- Edward Kennedy, former state senator from the 1st Middlesex district (2019–2025) (deceased)
- Robyn Kennedy, state senator from the 1st Worcester district (2023–present)
- David LeBoeuf, state representative from the 17th Worcester district (2019–present)
- Jason Lewis, state senator from the 5th Middlesex district (2014–present)
- Joan Lovely, state senator from the 2nd Essex district (2013–present)
- Liz Miranda, state senator from the 2nd Suffolk district (2023–present)
- Michael Moore, state senator from the 2nd Worcester district (2009–present)
- Susan Moran, former state senator from the Plymouth and Barnstable district (2020–2025)
- Therese Murray, former president of the Massachusetts Senate (2007–2015) from the Plymouth and Barnstable district (1993–2015)
- Marc Pacheco, former state senator from the 1st Plymouth and Bristol district (1993–2025)
- Michael Rodrigues, state senator from the 1st Bristol and Plymouth district (2011–present)
- Lindsay Sabadosa, state representative from the 1st Hampshire district (2019–present)
- Dan Wolf, former state senator from the Cape and Islands district (2011–2017)
- 29 other state representatives

Local officials

- Kevin Hayden, district attorney of Suffolk County (2022–present)
- Paul Heroux, sheriff of Bristol County (2023–present)
- Peter Koutoujian, sheriff of Middlesex County (2011–present) and former state representative from the 10th Middlesex district (1997–2011)
- Jon Mitchell, mayor of New Bedford (2012–present)
- Jared Nicholson, mayor of Lynn (2022–present)
- Joseph Petty, mayor of Worcester (2012–present)
- Marian Ryan, district attorney for Middlesex County (2013–present)
- Michelle Wu, mayor of Boston (2021–present)
- Ed Flynn, Boston city councilor from the 2nd district (2018–present)
- 10 other Boston city councilors

Individuals

- Ken Burns, filmmaker
- Alex Rikleen, history teacher and former candidate for this seat

Labor unions

- Massachusetts AFL-CIO
- American Federation of Government Employees
- American Federation of State, County, and Municipal Employees Council 93
- American Federation of Teachers Massachusetts
- Boston Teachers Union
- Association of Flight Attendants
- Brotherhood of Locomotive Engineers and Trainmen
- Committee of Interns and Residents
- International Brotherhood of Electrical Workers Local 103
- International Association of Machinists and Aerospace Workers State Council
- Massachusetts Teachers Association
- Massachusetts Nurses Association
- National Association of Government Employees Local 5000
- North Atlantic States Regional Council of Carpenters
- SEIU 32BJ
- SEIU Locals 1199, 888 and 509
- Teamsters Local 122
- UNITE HERE Local 26
- United Food and Commercial Workers Locals 328, 791, 1445, and 1459

Organizations

- Armenian National Committee of America
- Christopher Street Project
- College Democrats of Massachusetts
- End Citizens United
- Human Rights Campaign
- J Street
- Jewish Democratic Council of America
- Joint Action Committee for Political Affairs
- League of Conservation Voters
- Natural Resources Defense Council
- Our Revolution
- Planned Parenthood Action Fund
- Population Connection
- Progressive Change Campaign Committee
- Progressive Democrats of America
- Reproductive Freedom for All
- Sunrise Movement
- Voters of Tomorrow

Political parties

- Massachusetts Democratic Party

Newspapers

- The Berkshire Eagle
Seth Moulton

U.S. representatives

- Chrissy Houlahan, PA-06 (2019–present)
- Seth Magaziner, RI-02 (2023–present)
- Max Rose, former NY-11 (2019–2021)
- Pat Ryan, NY-18 (2023–present)
- Derek Tran, CA-45 (2025–present)

Statewide officials

- Mikie Sherrill, governor of New Jersey (2026–present)

State legislators

- John Cronin, state senator from the Worcester and Middlesex district (2021–present)

Individuals

- Tim Miller, political strategist and writer for The Bulwark

Labor unions

- Iron Workers Local 7
- International Brotherhood of Electrical Workers Locals 104, 1499, and 2325
- Plumbers and Gasfitters Local 12
- Teamsters Joint Council 10 and Locals 3, 25, 42, 59, 127, 170, 404, and 653
- Utility Workers Union of America

Organizations

- Democrats for Education Reform
- VoteVets

Newspapers

- The Boston Globe
Declined to endorse

Statewide officials

- Maura Healey, governor of Massachusetts (2023–present)

=== Fundraising ===
Italics indicate a withdrawn candidate

Campaign finance reports as of August 12, 2026
Candidate	Raised	Spent	Cash on hand
Ed Markey (D)	$8,051,970	$8,355,270	$1,348,676
Seth Moulton (D)	$6,213,103	$6,228,105	$1,835,336
Source: Federal Election Commission

=== Polling ===
Aggregate polls

Source of poll aggregation	Dates administered	Dates updated	Ed Markey	Seth Moulton	Undecided (Note: Calculated by taking the difference of 100% and all other candidates combined.)	Margin
270toWin	August 5–16, 2026	August 19, 2026	56.0%	35.0%	9.0%	Markey +21.0%
Race to the WH	through August 16, 2026	August 18, 2026	53.6%	35.4%	11.0% (Note: Alex Rikleen with 2.0%; William Francis Gates with 1.8%)	Markey +18.2%
Average			54.8%	35.2%	10.0%	Markey +19.6%

Poll source	Date(s) administered	Sample size (Note: Key: A – all adults RV – registered voters LV – likely voters V – unclear)	Margin of error	Ed Markey	Seth Moulton	Alex Rikleen	Other	Undecided
Emerson College	August 28–29, 2026	550 (LV)	± 4.1%	65% (Note: With voters who lean towards a given candidate)	35%	—	—	—
Emerson College	August 28–29, 2026	550 (LV)	± 4.1%	60%	33%	—	—	7%
University of New Hampshire	August 20–24, 2026	550 (LV)	± 4.2%	63%	28%	—	2% (Note: "Write in someone else" with 2%)	7%
Public Policy Polling (D) (Note: Poll sponsored by The Majority Institute)	August 17–18, 2026	645 (LV)	± 3.9%	59%	26%	—	—	15%
Public Policy Polling (D)	August 17–18, 2026	645 (LV)	± 3.9%	53%	22%	—	—	25%
Suffolk University (Note: Poll sponsored by The Boston Globe)	August 13–16, 2026	500 (RV)	± 4.4%	52%	38%	—	1% (Note: "Refused" with 1%)	9%
UMass Amherst/YouGov (Note: Poll sponsored by WCVB)	August 5–12, 2026	445 (LV)	± 5.8%	60%	32%	—	2% (Note: "Would not vote" with 2%)	7%
UMass Amherst/YouGov	August 5–12, 2026	445 (LV)	± 5.8%	54%	28%	—	1% (Note: "Would not vote" with 1%)	17%
University of New Hampshire	June 18–23, 2026	370 (LV)	± 5.1%	41%	35%	—	1%	23%
	May 27, 2026	Rikleen withdraws from the race, endorses Markey						
Emerson College	May 3–4, 2026	451 (LV)	± 4.5%	37%	32%	1%	1% (Note: William Gates with 1%)	29%
University of New Hampshire	April 16–20, 2026	353 (LV)	± 5.2%	46%	33%	6%	—	15%
Suffolk University	April 9–13, 2026	500 (RV)	± 4.4%	47%	30%	—	—	20%
University of New Hampshire	February 12–16, 2026	352 (LV)	± 5.2%	35%	23%	7%	5% (Note: "Another candidate" with 4%; William Francis Gates with 1%)	30%
Suffolk University	November 19–23, 2025	226 (LV)	± 6.5%	45%	22%	—	—	33%
University of New Hampshire	November 13–17, 2025	343 (LV)	± 5.3%	34%	25%	2%	3% (Note: 'Write in someone else' with 3%)	35%
Data for Progress (D)	October 23–26, 2025	652 (LV)	± 4.0%	53%	34%	—	—	13%
UMass Amherst/YouGov	October 21–29, 2025	416 (LV)	± 6.1%	51%	28%	6%	1%	14%
UMass Amherst/YouGov	October 21–29, 2025	416 (LV)	± 6.1%	44%	25%	5%	1%	25%

Hypothetical polling

Ed Markey vs. Seth Moulton vs. Ayanna Pressley

Poll source	Date(s) administered	Sample size	Margin of error	Ed Markey	Seth Moulton	Ayanna Pressley	Other	Undecided
Suffolk University	November 19–23, 2025	226 (LV)	± 6.5%	34%	16%	35%	—	15%

Ed Markey vs. Seth Moulton vs. Ayanna Pressley vs. Alex Rikleen

Poll source	Date(s) administered	Sample size	Margin of error	Ed Markey	Seth Moulton	Ayanna Pressley	Alex Rikleen	Other	Undecided
UMass Amherst/YouGov	October 21–29, 2025	416 (LV)	± 6.1%	35%	25%	21%	5%	1%	19%
UMass Amherst/YouGov	October 21–29, 2025	416 (LV)	± 6.1%	31%	24%	20%	4%	1%	24%

Seth Moulton vs. Ayanna Pressley vs. Michelle Wu vs. Joseph P. Kennedy III vs. Jake Auchincloss vs. Alex Rikleen

Poll source	Date(s) administered	Sample size	Margin of error	Seth Moulton	Ayanna Pressley	Michelle Wu	Joseph P. Kennedy III	Jake Auchincloss	Alex Rikleen	Other	Undecided
UMass Amherst/YouGov	October 21–29, 2025	416 (LV)	± 6.1%	29%	24%	19%	11%	6%	6%	1%	4%
UMass Amherst/YouGov	October 21–29, 2025	416 (LV)	± 6.1%	26%	23%	17%	9%	5%	3%	1%	16%

=== Debates ===
Democratic primary debates
No.	Date	Hosts	Moderators	Link	Democratic	Democratic
Key: P Participant A Absent N Not invited I Invited W Withdrawn						
Key: P Participant A Absent N Not invited I Invited W Withdrawn					Ed Markey	Seth Moulton
1	July 8, 2026	WWLP	Patrick Berry	YouTube	P	P
2	August 3, 2026	Boston 25 News; WGBH-FM	Kerry Kavanaugh; Adam Reilly	YouTube	P	P
3	August 20, 2026	WCVB-TV; WBUR-FM; The Boston Globe	Ed Harding	YouTube	P	P

=== Convention ===
Candidates must win at least 15% at the party convention in order to make it onto the primary ballot. The convention decides which candidate gets the party's endorsement for the primary election while the primary decides the party nominee for the general election.

Democratic convention vote, May 30
Party	Candidate	Votes	%
Democratic	Ed Markey (incumbent)	2,744	72.9
Democratic	Seth Moulton	1,018	27.1
Total votes		3,762	100.0

=== Results ===
Democratic primary results by county Markey: 50–60%; 60–70%; 70–80%

Democratic primary results
Party	Candidate	Votes	%
Democratic	Ed Markey (incumbent)	580,628	64.7
Democratic	Seth Moulton	314,198	35.0
Write-in		2,225	0.3
Total votes		897,051	100.0

== Republican primary ==
=== Candidates ===
==== Nominee ====
- John Deaton, attorney and nominee for U.S. Senate in 2024

==== Eliminated at convention or did not file ====
- Christopher Thrasher, Westport School Committee Chair and nominee for Massachusetts House of Representatives' 8th Bristol district in 2024

==== Withdrawn ====
- Nathan Bech, former West Springfield City Councilman and nominee for Massachusetts's 1st congressional district in 2008 (running as an independent)

==== Declined ====
- Charlie Baker, president of the National Collegiate Athletic Association (2023–present) and former Governor of Massachusetts (2015–2023)
- Michael Soter, state representative from the 8th Worcester district (2019–present)

=== Endorsements ===
John Deaton

Organizations

- Log Cabin Republicans

Political parties

- Massachusetts Republican Party

=== Fundraising ===
Italics indicate a withdrawn candidate.

Campaign finance reports as of August 12, 2026
Candidate	Raised	Spent	Cash on hand
John Deaton (R)	$1,561,360	$848,943	$712,417
Source: Federal Election Commission

=== Results ===
Republican primary results by county

Republican primary results
Party	Candidate	Votes	%
Republican	John Deaton	221,950	99.3
Write-in		1,555	0.7
Total votes		223,505	100.0

== Third parties and independents ==
=== Party for Socialism and Liberation ===
==== Candidates ====
===== Declared =====
- Joe Tache, organizer

==== Fundraising ====
Campaign finance reports as of September 3, 2026
Candidate	Raised	Spent	Cash on hand
Joe Tache (PSL)	$269,878	$176,871	$93,007
Source: Federal Election Commission

=== Independents ===
==== Candidates ====
===== Declared =====
- Shiva Ayyadurai, perennial candidate

===== Did not qualify =====
- Nathan Bech, former West Springfield City Councilman and Republican nominee for Massachusetts's 1st congressional district in 2008
- Morgan Dawicki
- Philip Devincentis

==== Fundraising ====
Campaign finance reports as of August 12, 2026
Candidate	Raised	Spent	Cash on hand
Shiva Ayyadurai (I)	$269,035	$150,776	$117,116
Nathan Bech (I)	$80,010	$56,107	$28,677
Morgan Dawicki (I)	$16,498	$7,743	$3,564
Source: Federal Election Commission

== General election ==
=== Predictions ===
Source	Ranking	As of
The Cook Political Report	Solid D	November 2, 2026
Decision Desk HQ	Safe D	November 3, 2026
The Economist (Note: The Economist's prediction model uses unconventional terminology. For the purpose of equivalency, their "Very Likely" ratings are formatted as a "Likely" rating while "Likely" ratings are formatted as a "Lean" rating.)	Safe D	November 3, 2026
FiftyPlusOne	Safe D	November 3, 2026
Fox News	Solid D	November 1, 2026
Inside Elections	Solid D	October 29, 2026
MS NOW	Safe D	October 29, 2026
NBC News	Solid D	November 3, 2026
RealClearPolitics	Solid D	November 2, 2026
Sabato's Crystal Ball	Safe D	November 2, 2026
Silver Bulletin	Solid D	November 3, 2026
Split Ticket	Safe D	November 2, 2026

=== Post-primary endorsements ===
Ed Markey (D)

Labor unions

- United Auto Workers
Joe Tache (PSL)

Organizations

- Berkshires Democratic Socialists of America

=== Fundraising ===
Campaign finance reports as of October 14, 2026
Candidate	Raised	Spent	Cash on hand
Ed Markey (D)	$8,685,207	$9,537,271	$799,913
John Deaton (R)	$1,674,460	$1,186,303	$488,156
Joe Tache (PSL)	$285,403	$261,623	$23,780
Shiva Ayyadurai (I)	$245,729	$159,434	$85,152
Source: Federal Election Commission

=== Debates ===
2026 Massachusetts U.S. Senate election debates and forums
No.	Date	Host	Moderator	Link	Democratic	Democratic	Republican	Socialism and Liberation
Key: P Participant A Absent N Not invited I Invited W Withdrawn								
Key: P Participant A Absent N Not invited I Invited W Withdrawn					Ed Markey	Seth Moulton	John Deaton	Joe Tache
1	June 16, 2026	WBZ-TV	Jon Keller	C-SPAN	A	P	P	N
2	October 13, 2026	WBZ-TV	Jon Keller	YouTube	P	N	P	N
3	October 27, 2026	BreakThrough News	Zoe Alexandra; Rania Khalek	YouTube	A	N	P	P

=== Polling ===
Aggregate polls

Source of poll aggregation	Dates administered	Dates updated	Ed Markey (D)	John Deaton (R)	Other/ Undecided (Note: Calculated by taking the difference of 100% and all other candidates combined.)	Margin
270toWin	October 5–31, 2026	November 2, 2026	56.0%	29.8%	14.2%	Markey +26.2%
Decision Desk HQ	through October 31, 2026	November 2, 2026	55.1%	29.2%	15.7%	Markey +25.9%
RealClearPolitics	October 5–31, 2026	November 1, 2026	56.0%	29.8%	14.2%	Markey +26.2%
Silver Bulletin	through October 31, 2026	November 3, 2026	56.7%	30.4%	12.9%	Markey +26.3%
Average			56.0%	29.8%	14.2%	Markey +26.2%

Poll source	Date(s) administered	Sample size	Margin of error	Ed Markey (D)	John Deaton (R)	Joe Tache (PSL)	Shiva Ayyadurai (I)	Other	Undecided
University of New Hampshire	October 27–31, 2026	905 (LV)	± 3.3%	53%	32%	7%	4%	<1%	4%
Suffolk University	October 14–18, 2026	500 (LV)	± 4.4%	60%	32%	1%	1%	—	6%
UMass Lowell	October 7–18, 2026	850 (LV)	± 4.4%	55%	26%	—	—	4%	12%
UMass Amherst/YouGov	October 5–12, 2026	800 (RV)	± 4.2%	56%	29%	3%	6%	2%	4%
UMass Amherst/YouGov	October 5–12, 2026	800 (RV)	± 4.2%	54%	28%	2%	5%	2%	9%
MassINC Polling Group	September 14–22, 2026	800 (LV)	± 4.0%	54%	28%	2%	3%	5% (Note: "Another candidate" with 3%; "Prefer not to say" with 2%)	9%
MassINC Polling Group	September 14–22, 2026	800 (LV)	± 4.0%	52%	26%	2%	2%	4% (Note: "Another candidate" with 3%; "Prefer not to say" with 1%)	14%
University of New Hampshire	September 17–21, 2026	564 (LV)	± 4.1%	53%	30%	9%	—	—	8%
	September 1, 2026	Primary elections							
University of New Hampshire	August 20–24, 2026	881 (LV)	± 2.2%	49%	30%	7%	—	1% (Note: "Write in someone else" with 1%)	12%
UMass Amherst/YouGov	August 5–12, 2026	800 (RV)	± 4.4%	51%	30%	—	—	3% (Note: "Would not Vote" with 3%)	15%
University of New Hampshire	June 18–23, 2026	623 (LV)	± 3.8%	50%	34%	—	—	—	16%
Suffolk University	June 8–12, 2026	500 (LV)	± 4.4%	55%	30%	—	—	1% (Note: "Refused" with 1%)	14%
University of New Hampshire	April 16–20, 2026	603 (LV)	± 4.0%	55%	32%	—	—	1% (Note: "Another candidate" with 1%)	12%
University of New Hampshire	February 12–16, 2026	620 (LV)	± 3.9%	56%	27%	—	—	2% (Note: "Another candidate with 2%)	15%
Cygnal (R) (Note: Poll sponsored by Deaton's campaign)	January 22–25, 2026	800 (LV)	± 3.5%	54%	30%	—	—	—	16%
Suffolk University	November 19–23, 2025	500 (RV)	± 4.4%	54%	31%	—	—	—	15%
SurveyUSA (Note: Poll sponsored by the Massachusetts Responsible Alliance)	February 28 – March 4, 2025	775 (RV)	—	45%	26%	—	—	—	30%

Hypothetical polling

Ed Markey vs. Charlie Baker

Poll source	Date(s) administered	Sample size	Margin of error	Ed Markey (D)	Charlie Baker (R)	Other	Undecided
UMass Amherst/YouGov	February 14–20, 2025	700 (A)	± 4.8%	35%	33%	—	33%
MassINC Polling Group	October 29 – November 1, 2024	582 (LV)	± 4.9%	34%	40%	7% (Note: "Would not vote for Senate" & "Another candidate" with 3%; "Prefer not to say" with 1%)	19%

Seth Moulton vs. John Deaton

Poll source	Date(s) administered	Sample size	Margin of error	Seth Moulton (D)	John Deaton (R)	Other	Undecided
University of New Hampshire	August 20–24, 2026	881 (LV)	± 2.2%	38%	25%	18% (Note: Joe Tache (PSL) with 16%; "Write in someone else" with 2%)	19%
UMass Amherst/YouGov	August 5–12, 2026	800 (RV)	± 4.4%	49%	25%	3% (Note: "Would not Vote" with 3%)	22%
University of New Hampshire	June 18–23, 2026	623 (LV)	± 3.8%	50%	30%	1%	19%
Suffolk University	June 8–12, 2026	500 (LV)	± 4.4%	54%	26%	2% (Note: "Refused" with 2%)	18%
University of New Hampshire	April 16–20, 2026	600 (LV)	± 4.0%	56%	25%	1%	18%
University of New Hampshire	February 12–16, 2026	620 (LV)	± 3.9%	59%	23%	2%	16%
Suffolk University	November 19–23, 2025	500 (RV)	± 4.4%	52%	29%	—	19%

=== Results ===
2026 United States Senate election in Massachusetts
Party	Candidate	Votes	%	±%
Democratic	Ed Markey (incumbent)	1,718,276	63.68	
Republican	John Deaton	855,969	31.72	
Independent	Shiva Ayyadurai	61,085	2.27	
Socialism and Liberation	Joe Tache	59,097	2.19	
Write-in		3,811	0.14	
Total votes		2,698,238	100.0	

== Notes ==
Partisan clients
