= 2026 United States House of Representatives elections in Massachusetts =

- November 3, 2026

All 9 Massachusetts seats to the United States House of Representatives
	Majority party	Minority party
Party	Democratic	Republican
Last election	9	0
Seats won	9	0
Seat change	Steady	Steady
Popular vote	1,724,771	508,513
Percentage	73.58%	21.69%
Swing	▼6.61%	▲11.46%

Democratic
50–60%
60–70%
70–80%
80–90%
90–100%
Republican
40–50%
50–60%
Independent
50–60%

The 2026 United States House of Representatives elections in Massachusetts were held on November 3, 2026, to elect the nine U.S. representatives from the Commonwealth of Massachusetts, one from all nine of the state's congressional districts. The elections coincided with other elections to the House of Representatives, elections to the United States Senate, and various state and local elections in Massachusetts. Primary elections took place on September 1, 2026.

== District 1 ==
2026 Massachusetts's 1st congressional district election
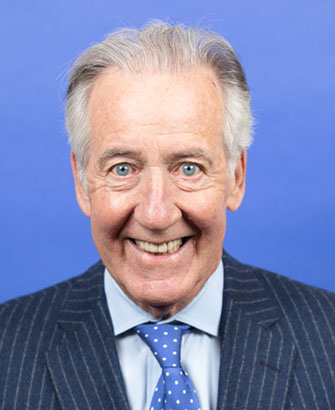

Nominee	Richard Neal	Nadia Milleron
Party	Democratic	Independent
- Neal: 50–60% 60–70% 70–80% Milleron: 50–60% No data
Incumbent U.S. Representative
Richard Neal
Democratic

The 1st congressional district is in western Massachusetts and includes Springfield and Pittsfield. The incumbent is Richard Neal, who was re-elected with 62.5% of the vote in 2024.

=== Democratic primary ===
==== Nominee ====
- Richard Neal, incumbent U.S. representative

==== Eliminated in primary ====
- Jeromie Whalen, teacher

==== Endorsements ====
Richard Neal

Labor unions

- American Federation of Government Employees
- Massachusetts AFL-CIO

Organizations

- AIPAC
- Democratic Majority for Israel
- Jewish Democratic Council of America
- J Street PAC
- Planned Parenthood Action Fund

State legislators

- William "Smitty" Pignatelli, former state representative (2003–2025)

Newspapers

- The Berkshire Eagle
Jeromie Whalen

Labor unions

- Massachusetts Teachers Association

Organizations

- College Democrats of Massachusetts
- Massachusetts Peace Action
- Our Revolution
- Peace Action
- Progressive Democrats of America
- Progressive Victory
- Track AIPAC

==== Fundraising ====
Campaign finance reports as of August 12, 2026
Candidate	Raised	Spent	Cash on hand
Richard Neal (D)	$2,462,685	$3,074,234	$3,276,321
Jeromie Whalen (D)	$335,864	$296,488	$39,375
Source: Federal Election Commission

==== Debate ====
2026 Massachusetts's 1st congressional district democratic primary debate
No.	Date	Host	Moderator	Link	Democratic	Democratic
Key: P Participant A Absent N Not invited I Invited W Withdrawn						
Key: P Participant A Absent N Not invited I Invited W Withdrawn					Richard Neal	Jeromie Whalen
1	August 19, 2026	WWLP-TV	Patrick Berry		P	P

==== Results ====
Primary results by town: Neal: 50–60%; 60–70%; 70–80%; Whalen: 50–60%; 60–70%; 70–80%; Tie: 50–60%

Democratic primary results
Party	Candidate	Votes	%
Democratic	Richard Neal (incumbent)	49,927	54.0
Democratic	Jeromie Whalen	42,488	45.9
Write-in		126	0.1
Total votes		92,541	100.0

=== Independents ===
==== Declared ====
- Nadia Milleron, consumer advocate and candidate for this district in 2024

==== Fundraising ====
Campaign finance reports as of March 31, 2026
Candidate	Raised	Spent	Cash on hand
Nadia Milleron (I)	$26,918	$18,042	$22,026
Source: Federal Election Commission

=== General election ===
==== Post-primary endorsements ====
Nadia Milleron

Individuals

- Ralph Nader, presidential candidate in 1996, 2000, 2004, and 2008 (candidate's uncle)

==== Predictions ====
Source	Ranking	As of
Decision Desk HQ	Safe D	July 14, 2026
The Cook Political Report	Solid D	February 6, 2025
Inside Elections	Solid D	March 7, 2025
Sabato's Crystal Ball	Safe D	July 15, 2025
Silver Bulletin	Solid D	August 20, 2026

== District 2 ==
2026 Massachusetts's 2nd congressional district election
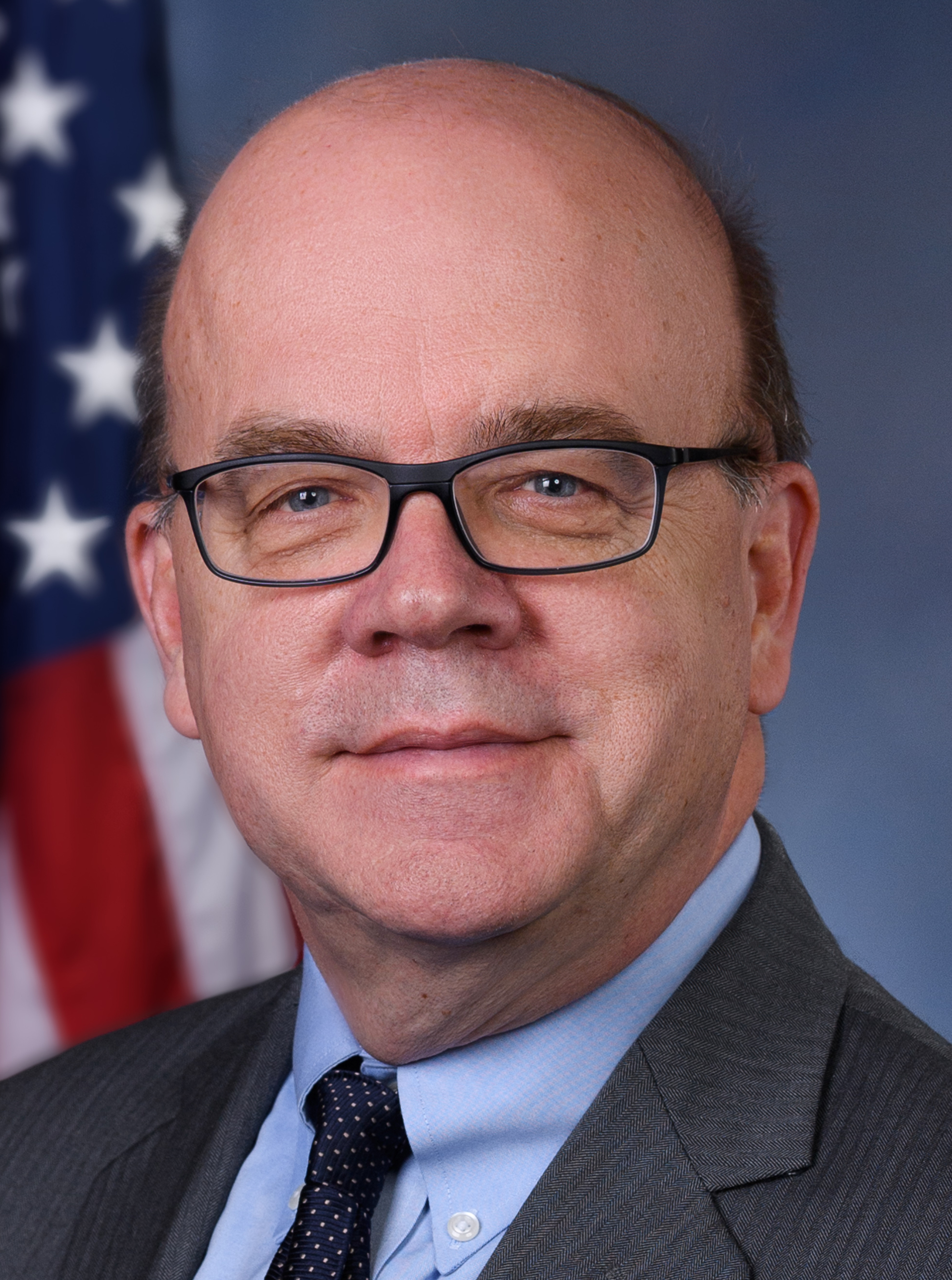
Nominee	Jim McGovern
Party	Democratic
- McGovern: 90–100%
U.S. Representative before election
Jim McGovern
Democratic
Elected U.S. Representative
Jim McGovern
Democratic

The 2nd congressional district is in central Massachusetts and includes Worcester. The incumbent is Democrat Jim McGovern, who was re-elected with 68.6% of the vote in 2024.

=== Democratic primary ===
==== Nominee ====
- Jim McGovern, incumbent U.S. representative

==== Endorsements ====
Jim McGovern

Labor unions

- American Federation of Government Employees
- Massachusetts AFL-CIO
- Massachusetts Teachers Association

Organizations

- End Citizens United
- Humane World Action Fund
- J Street PAC
- Peace Action
- Planned Parenthood Action Fund
- Progressive Democrats of America
- Sierra Club

==== Fundraising ====
Campaign finance reports as of March 31, 2026
Candidate	Raised	Spent	Cash on hand
Jim McGovern (D)	$515,774	$646,932	$263,006
Source: Federal Election Commission

==== Results ====
Democratic primary results
Party	Candidate	Votes	%
Democratic	Jim McGovern (incumbent)	80,813	99.6
Write-in		324	0.4
Total votes		81,137	100.0

=== General election ===
==== Predictions ====
Source	Ranking	As of
Decision Desk HQ	Safe D	July 14, 2026
The Cook Political Report	Solid D	February 6, 2025
Inside Elections	Solid D	March 7, 2025
Sabato's Crystal Ball	Safe D	July 15, 2025
Silver Bulletin	Solid D	August 20, 2026

== District 3 ==
2026 Massachusetts's 3rd congressional district election
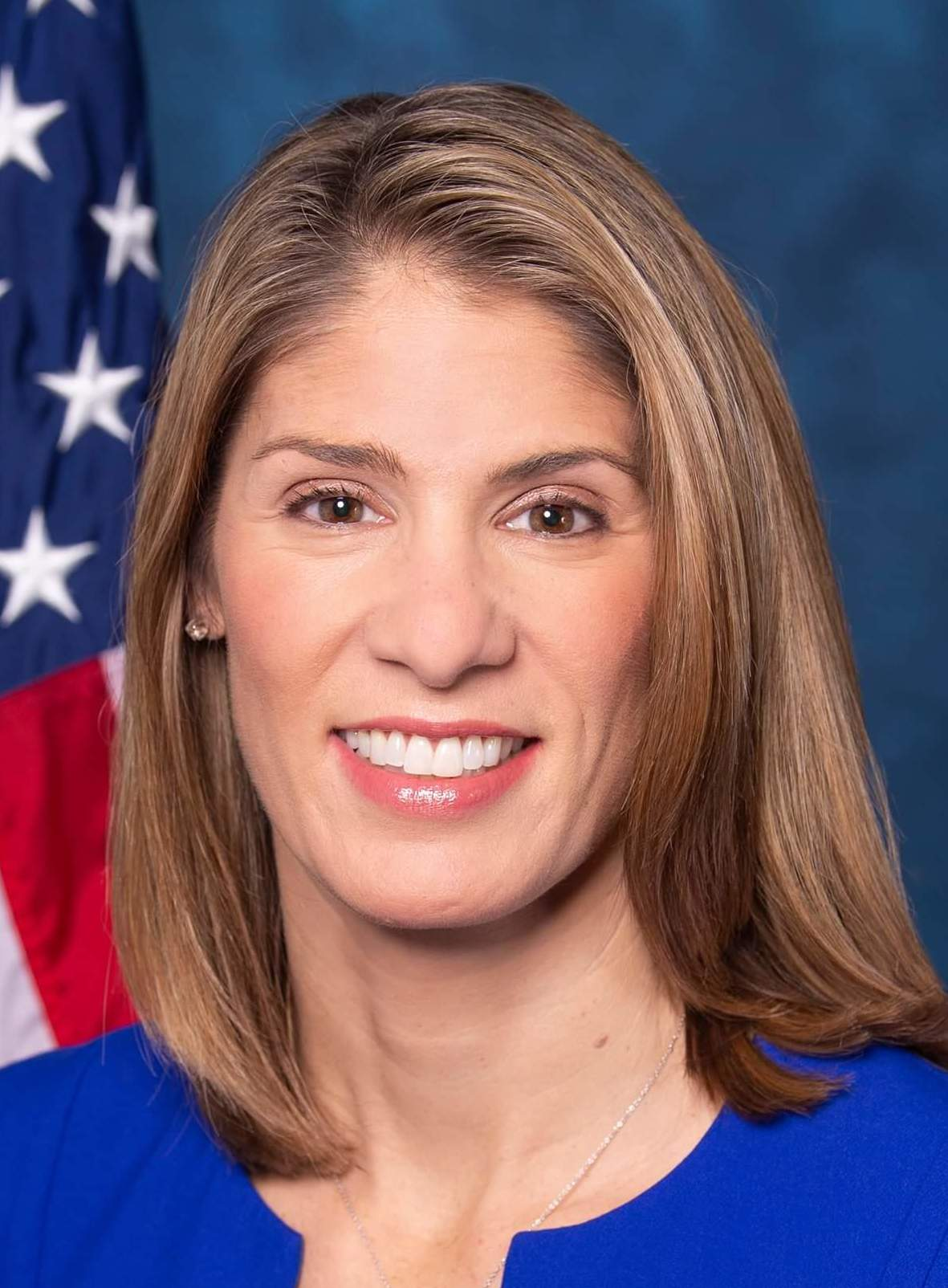

Nominee	Lori Trahan	Gary Grossi
Party	Democratic	Republican
- Trahan: 50–60% 60–70% 70–80% 80–90% Grossi: 40–50%
Incumbent U.S. Representative
Lori Trahan
Democratic

The 3rd congressional district is in northeastern and central Massachusetts and includes Lowell and Lawrence. The incumbent is Lori Trahan, who was re-elected uncontested in 2024.

=== Democratic primary ===
==== Nominee ====
- Lori Trahan, incumbent U.S. representative

==== Endorsements ====
Lori Trahan

Labor unions

- American Federation of Government Employees

Organizations

- J Street
- Planned Parenthood Action Fund

==== Fundraising ====
Campaign finance reports as of March 31, 2026
Candidate	Raised	Spent	Cash on hand
Lori Trahan (D)	$1,295,055	$1,067,021	$1,683,185
Source: Federal Election Commission

==== Results ====
Democratic primary results
Party	Candidate	Votes	%
Democratic	Lori Trahan (incumbent)	69,670	99.2
Write-in		527	0.8
Total votes		70,197	100.0

=== Republican primary ===
==== Nominee ====
- Gary Grossi, retired U.S. Army colonel

==== Fundraising ====
Campaign finance reports as of March 31, 2026
Candidate	Raised	Spent	Cash on hand
Gary Grossi (R)	$4,550	$21	$4,529
Source: Federal Election Commission

==== Results ====
Republican primary results
Party	Candidate	Votes	%
Republican	Gary Grossi	22,068	99.0
Write-in		218	1.0
Total votes		22,286	100.0

=== Independents ===
==== Declared ====
- Dennis R. Conlon

==== Did not qualify ====
- Kevin Ades, computer programmer

=== General election ===
==== Fundraising ====
Campaign finance reports as of September 30, 2026
Candidate	Raised	Spent	Cash on hand
Lori Trahan (D)	$1,295,055	$1,067,021	$1,683,185
Gary Grossi (R)	$4,347	$1,746	$6,600
Source: Federal Election Commission

==== Predictions ====
Source	Ranking	As of
Decision Desk HQ	Safe D	July 14, 2026
The Cook Political Report	Solid D	February 6, 2025
Inside Elections	Solid D	March 7, 2025
Sabato's Crystal Ball	Safe D	July 15, 2025
Silver Bulletin	Solid D	August 20, 2026

== District 4 ==
2026 Massachusetts's 4th congressional district election
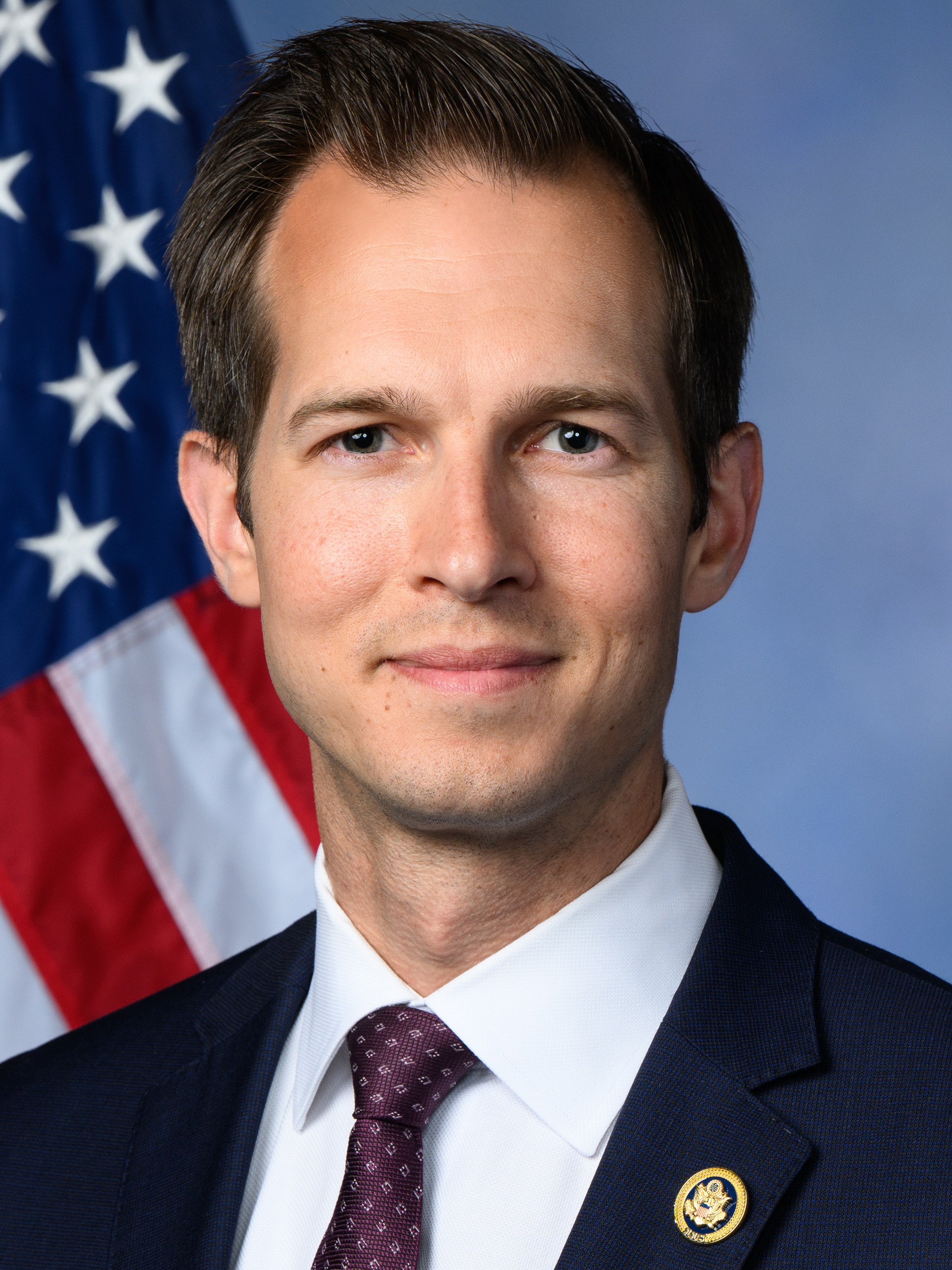

Nominee	Jake Auchincloss	Tom Stalcup
Party	Democratic	Republican
- Auchincloss: 50–60% 60–70% 70–80% 80–90% Stalcup: 50–60%
Incumbent U.S. Representative
Jake Auchincloss
Democratic

The 4th district contains much of southeastern Massachusetts and includes Newton, Attleboro, and Fall River. The incumbent is Jake Auchincloss, who was re-elected uncontested in 2024. Auchincloss is currently running for re-election, and ruled out running for U.S. Senate in 2026 despite speculation he might enter the contest.

=== Democratic primary ===
==== Nominee ====
- Jake Auchincloss, incumbent U.S. representative

==== Eliminated in primary ====
- Jason Poulos, AI researcher

==== Withdrawn ====
- Ihssane Leckey, consulting firm CEO and candidate for this district in 2020
- Chris Boyd, educator

==== Declined ====
- Jesse Mermell, former Brookline Board of Selectmen member and candidate for this district in 2020

==== Endorsements ====
Jake Auchincloss

State legislators

- James Arena-DeRosa, state representative from the 8th Middlesex district (2023–present)
- Cynthia Stone Creem, majority leader of the Massachusetts Senate (2018–present) from the Norfolk and Middlesex district (1999–present)
- Paul Feeney, state senator from the Bristol and Norfolk district (2017–present)
- Lisa Field, state representative from the 3rd Bristol district (2025–present)
- Carole Fiola, state representative from the 6th Bristol district (2013–present)
- Dennis Gallagher, state representative from the 8th Plymouth district (2025–present)
- Jim Hawkins, state representative from the 2nd Bristol district (2018–present)
- Brian Murray, state representative from the 10th Worcester district (2017–present)
- Steven Ouellette, state representative from the 8th Bristol district (2025–present)
- Alice Peisch, state representative from the 14th Norfolk district (2003–present)
- Ted Philips, state representative from the 8th Norfolk district (2021–present)
- Becca Rausch, state senator from the Norfolk, Worcester and Middlesex district (2019–present)
- Michael Rodrigues, state senator from the 1st Bristol and Plymouth district (2011–present)
- Jeffrey Roy, state representative from the 10th Norfolk district (2013–present)
- Amy Mah Sangiolo, state representative from the 11th Middlesex district (2025–present)
- Adam Scanlon, state representative from the 14th Bristol district (2021–present)
- Greg Schwartz, state representative from the 12th Middlesex district (2025–present)
- Alan Silvia, state representative from the 7th Bristol district (2013–present)
- Joshua Tarsky, state representative from the 13th Norfolk district (2025–present)
- Tommy Vitolo, state representative from the 15th Norfolk district (2019–present)

Labor unions

- American Federation of Government Employees
- Massachusetts AFL-CIO

Organizations

- AIPAC
- Giffords
- J Street
- Jewish Democratic Council of America
- Joint Action Committee for Political Affairs
- Planned Parenthood Action Fund
- Vote Vets
Jason Poulos

Labor unions

- Massachusetts Teachers Association

Organizations

- Progressive Democrats of America
- Track AIPAC

==== Fundraising ====
Italics indicate a withdrawn candidate.

Campaign finance reports as of August 12, 2026
Candidate	Raised	Spent	Cash on hand
Jake Auchincloss (D)	$3,630,329	$1,271,790	$7,341,766
Chris Boyd (D)	$2,945	$1,010	$1,935
Ihssane Leckey (D)	$24,575	$12,125	$12,450
Jason Poulos (D)	$68,414	$56,985	$11,430
Source: Federal Election Commission

==== Polling ====
Poll source	Date(s) administered	Sample size (Note: Key: A – all adults RV – registered voters LV – likely voters V – unclear)	Margin of error	Jake Auchincloss	Jason Poulos	Undecided
Global Strategy Group (D) (Note: Poll sponsored by Auchincloss's campaign)	June 25–29 2026	400 (LV)	—	64%	17%	19%

==== Results ====
Democratic primary results
Party	Candidate	Votes	%
Democratic	Jake Auchincloss (incumbent)	66,952	73.1
Democratic	Jason Poulos	24,524	26.8
Write-in		144	0.1
Total votes		91,620	100.0

=== Republican primary ===
==== Nominee ====
- Tom Stalcup, physicist and entrepreneur

==== Results ====
Republican primary results
Party	Candidate	Votes	%
Republican	Tom Stalcup	21,905	99.4
Write-in		125	0.6
Total votes		22,030	100.0

=== Independents ===
==== Did not qualify ====
- Steve Chasse, recovery therapist
- Matthew Cook

=== General election ===
==== Predictions ====
Source	Ranking	As of
Decision Desk HQ	Safe D	July 14, 2026
The Cook Political Report	Solid D	February 6, 2025
Inside Elections	Solid D	March 7, 2025
Sabato's Crystal Ball	Safe D	July 15, 2025
Silver Bulletin	Solid D	August 20, 2026

== District 5 ==
2026 Massachusetts's 5th congressional district election
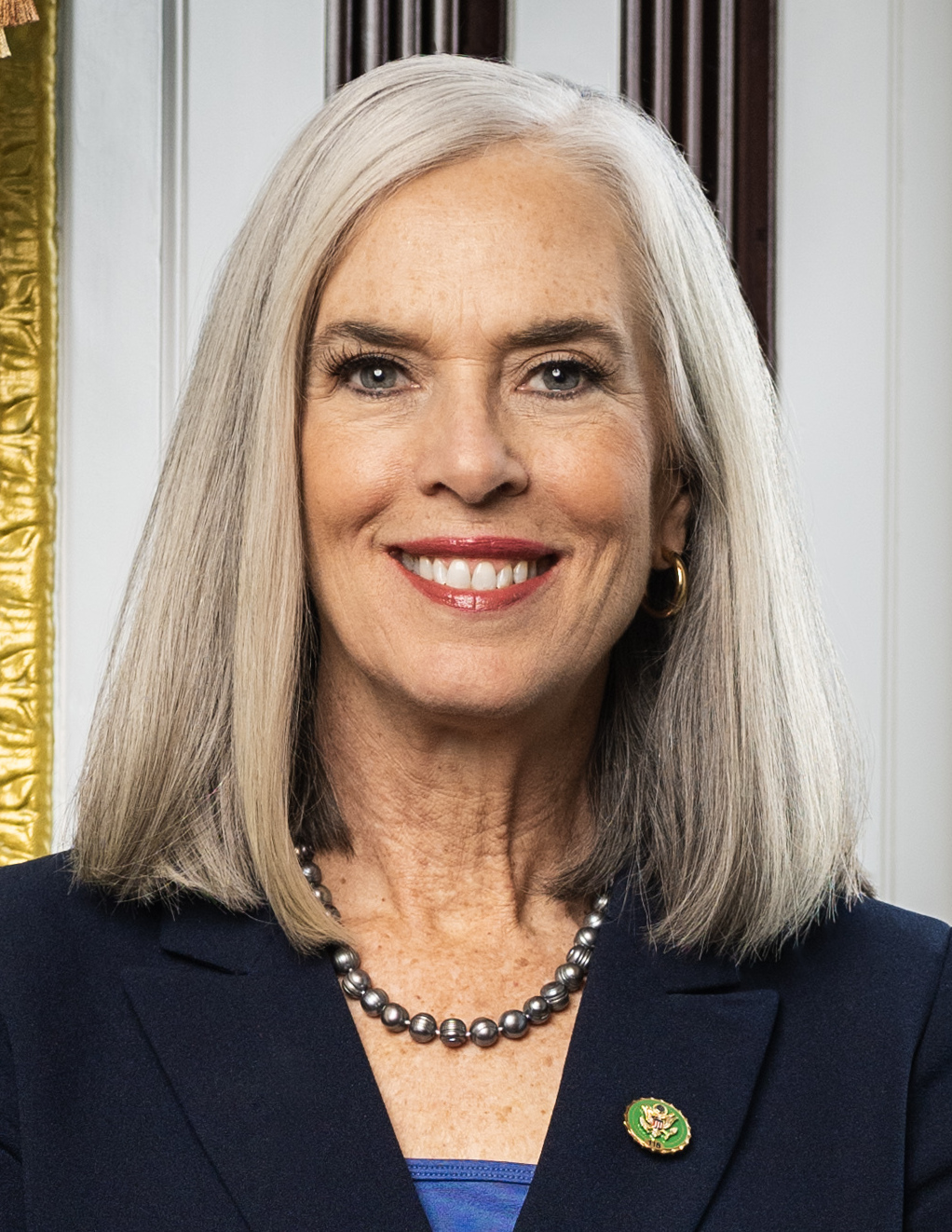
Nominee	Katherine Clark
Party	Democratic
- Clark: 90–100%
U.S. representative before election
Katherine Clark
Democratic
Elected U.S. representative
Katherine Clark
Democratic

The 5th district represents parts of eastern Massachusetts and includes Framingham, Medford, and parts of Cambridge. The incumbent is Democrat Katherine Clark, who was re-elected uncontested in 2024.

=== Democratic primary ===
==== Nominee ====
- Katherine Clark, incumbent U.S. representative

==== Eliminated in primary ====
- Jonathan Paz, former Waltham city councilor
- Tarik Samman, researcher at Harvard Law

==== Endorsements ====
Katherine Clark

Labor unions

- American Federation of Government Employees
- Massachusetts AFL-CIO

Organizations

- AIPAC
- Christopher Street Project
- Human Rights Campaign
- Jewish Democratic Council of America
- Joint Action Committee for Political Affairs
- J Street PAC
- League of Conservation Voters
- Planned Parenthood Action Fund
- Population Connection
- Reproductive Freedom for All
- Sierra Club
Jonathan Paz

Organizations

- CAIR Action
- IfNotNow Boston
- Massachusetts Peace Action
- Our Revolution Massachusetts
- Progressive Democrats of America

==== Fundraising ====
Campaign finance reports as of August 12, 2026
Candidate	Raised	Spent	Cash on hand
Katherine Clark (D)	$4,503,671	$3,781,770	$2,047,792
Jonathan Paz (D)	$88,524	$81,579	$11,897
Tarik Samman (D)	$43,812	$23,912	$19,900
Source: Federal Election Commission

==== Results ====
Democratic primary results
Party	Candidate	Votes	%
Democratic	Katherine Clark (incumbent)	85,802	73.6
Democratic	Jonathan Paz	22,904	19.7
Democratic	Tarik Samman	7,675	6.6
Write-in		171	0.1
Total votes		116,552	100.0

=== Independents ===
==== Filed paperwork ====
- Derek Fleming, small business owner

=== General election ===
==== Predictions ====
Source	Ranking	As of
Decision Desk HQ	Safe D	July 14, 2026
The Cook Political Report	Solid D	February 6, 2025
Inside Elections	Solid D	March 7, 2025
Sabato's Crystal Ball	Safe D	July 15, 2025
Silver Bulletin	Solid D	August 20, 2026

== District 6 ==
2026 Massachusetts's 6th congressional district election
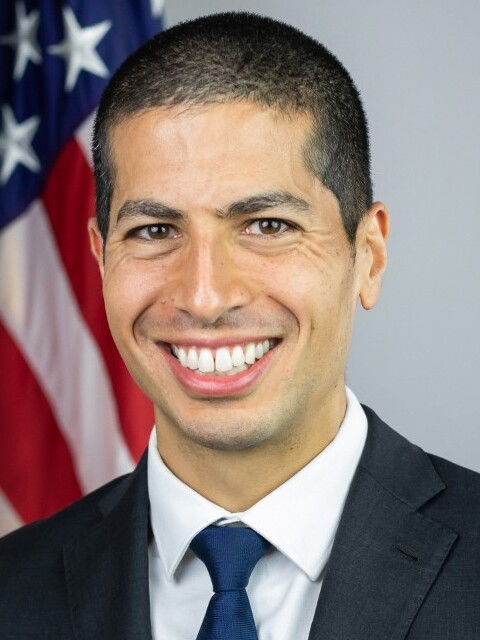

Nominee	Dan Koh	Micah Jones
Party	Democratic	Republican
- Koh: 50–60% 60–70% 70–80% Jones: 50–60%
Incumbent U.S. Representative
Seth Moulton
Democratic

The 6th district represents northeastern Massachusetts and includes Salem, Peabody, and Gloucester. The incumbent is Democrat Seth Moulton, who was re-elected uncontested in 2024.

Moulton's comments on transgender individuals following the 2024 United States presidential election drew condemnation from local and national Democrats, including Governor Maura Healey. Combined with his short-lived presidential campaign in the 2020 Democratic primaries and unsuccessful attempt to oust Nancy Pelosi as speaker in 2019, Moulton was seen as vulnerable to a primary challenger. On October 15, Moulton declared his candidacy for U.S. Senate in the Democratic primary against incumbent Senator Ed Markey.

=== Democratic primary ===
==== Nominee ====
- Dan Koh, former deputy director of the White House Office of Intergovernmental Affairs (2022–2025), former Andover selectman (2019–2021), and candidate for the 3rd district in 2018

==== Eliminated in primary ====
- Beth Andres-Beck, member of the Middleton Master Plan Committee
- John Beccia, lawyer and business executive
- Jamie Belsito, Topsfield Town Moderator (2023–present), former state representative from the 4th Essex district (2021–2023), and candidate for this district in 2020
- Tram Nguyen, state representative from the 18th Essex district (2019–present)

==== Withdrawn ====
- Rachel Creemers, progressive activist
- Rick Jakious, former chief of staff to incumbent Seth Moulton
- Mariah Lancaster, veterinarian (remained on ballot; endorsed Nguyen)
- Kevin Larivee, deputy general counsel at Massachusetts Executive Office of Health and Human Services

==== Declined ====
- Jenny Armini, state representative from the 8th Essex district (2023–present)
- Brendan Crighton, state senator from the 3rd Essex district (2018–present)
- Kim Driscoll, Lieutenant Governor of Massachusetts (2023–present) (running for re-election)
- Sally Kerans, state representative from the 13th Essex district (1991–1997, 2021–present)
- Thomas McGee, chair of the Massachusetts Bay Transportation Authority Board of Directors (2024–present) and former mayor of Lynn (2018–2022)
- Seth Moulton, incumbent U.S. representative (ran for U.S. Senate)
- Jared Nicholson, mayor of Lynn (2022–present)
- Dominick Pangallo, mayor of Salem (2023–present)

==== Endorsements ====
Beth Andres-Beck

Organizations

- Advocates for Trans Equality
- Progressive Victory
Jamie Belsito

Statewide officials

- Diana DiZoglio, state auditor of Massachusetts (2023–present)

Organizations

- Massachusetts Peace Action
- Track AIPAC (co-endorsement with Nguyen)
Dan Koh

Executive branch officials

- Joe Biden, former president of the United States (2021–2025)
- Pete Buttigieg, former secretary of transportation (2021–2025)
- Miguel Cardona, former secretary of education (2021–2025)
- Stephanie Cutter, former advisor to the President (2011)
- Jennifer Granholm, former secretary of energy (2021–2025)
- Kamala Harris, former vice president of the United States (2021–2025)
- Ron Klain, former White House chief of staff (2021–2023)
- Mitch Landrieu, former senior advisor to the President (2021–2024)
- Denis McDonough, former secretary of veterans affairs (2021–2025)
- Jen O'Malley Dillon, former White House deputy chief of staff (2021–2024)
- Tom Perez, former senior advisor to the President (2023–2025)
- Gina Raimondo, former secretary of commerce (2021–2025) and former governor of Rhode Island (2015–2021)
- Annie Tomasini, former White House deputy chief of staff (2024–2025)
- Marty Walsh, former secretary of labor (2021–2023) and former mayor of Boston (2014–2021)
- Jeff Zients, former White House chief of staff (2023–2025)

U.S. senators

- Chris Coons, Delaware (2011–present)
- Andy Kim, New Jersey (2024–present)

U.S. representatives

- Gabe Amo, RI-01 (2023–present)
- Michael Harrington, former MA-06 (1969–1979)
- John Tierney, former MA-06 (1997–2015)

Statewide officials

- Steven Grossman, former treasurer and receiver-general of Massachusetts (2011–2015)

Individuals

- Shannon Watts, founder of Moms Demand Action

Labor unions

- Massachusetts AFL–CIO
- American Federation of State, County, and Municipal Employees Council 93
- Boilermakers Local 29
- Electrical Workers Local 2222
- Building Wreckers Local 1421
- Heat and Frost Insulators Local 6
- International Brotherhood of Electrical Workers Locals 103 and 104
- International Union of Elevator Constructors Local 4
- International Union of Operating Engineers Local 4
- International Union of Painters and Allied Trades District Council 35
- Ironworkers Local 7
- Laborers Local 22
- National Association of Government Employees Local 5000
- Operative Plasterers' and Cement Masons' International Association Local 534
- Professional Fire Fighters of Massachusetts
- Plumbers and Gasfitters Local 12
- Roofers Local 33
- Sheet Metal Workers Local 17
- Sprinkler Fitters Local 550
- Tunnel Workers Local 88

Organizations

- End Citizens United
- Leading the Future
Tram Nguyen

U.S. representatives

- Ayanna Pressley, MA-07 (2019–present)
- Lori Trahan, MA-03 (2019–present)

Statewide officials

- Andrea Campbell, attorney general of Massachusetts (2023–present)

State legislators

- Manny Cruz, state representative from the 7th Essex district (2023–present)
- Lydia Edwards, state senator from the 1st Suffolk and Middlesex district (2022–present)
- Ken Gordon, state representative from the 21st Middlesex district (2013–present)
- Richard Haggerty, state representative from the 30th Middlesex district (2019–present)
- Ron Mariano, Speaker of the Massachusetts House of Representatives (2020–present) from the 3rd Norfolk district (1991–present)
- Dave Robertson, state representative from the 19th Middlesex district (2019–present)
- Dawne Shand, state representative from the 1st Essex district (2023–present)

Individuals

- Mariah Lancaster, veterinarian and former candidate for this seat

Labor unions

- Boston Carmen's Union Local 589
- International Brotherhood of Electrical Workers Locals 1505, 2321, and 2325
- SEIU Massachusetts state council
- United Auto Workers

Organizations

- Elect Democratic Women
- New American Leaders Action Fund
- People for the American Way
- Track AIPAC (co-endorsement with Belsito)

Newspapers

- The Boston Globe
Mariah Lancaster (withdrawn, remained on ballot)

Labor unions

- Massachusetts Teachers Association

Organizations

- Progressive Democrats of America

==== Fundraising ====
Italics indicate a withdrawn candidate.

Campaign finance reports as of August 12, 2026
Candidate	Raised	Spent	Cash on hand
Beth Andres-Beck (D)	$367,392 (Note: $149,133 of this total was self-funded by Andres-Beck)	$353,214	$14,428
John Beccia (D)	$4,513,050 (Note: $3,043,664 of this total was self-funded by Beccia)	$3,762,625	$750,426
Rick Jakious (D)	$354,696 (Note: $50,000 of this total was self-funded by Jakious)	$346,863	$7,832
Dan Koh (D)	$4,716,543 (Note: $93,504 of this total was self-funded by Koh)	$2,723,575	$1,994,307
Tram Nguyen (D)	$894,451 (Note: $0 of this total was self-funded by Nguyen)	$705,439	$189,011
Mariah Lancaster (D)	$348,466 (Note: $0 of this total was self-funded by Lancaster)	$292,795	$55,671
Jamie Belsito (D)	$309,082 (Note: $26,373 of this total was self-funded by Belsito)	$260,731	$48,351
Source: Federal Election Commission

==== Polling ====
Poll source	Date(s) administered	Sample size	Margin of error	Beth Andres-Beck	John Beccia	Jamie Belsito	Dan Koh	Mariah Lancaster	Tram Nguyen	Other	Undecided
	August 29, 2026	Mariah Lancaster withdraws, endorses Nguyen									
Global Strategy Group (D) (Note: Poll sponsored by Koh's campaign)	August 20–23, 2026	400 (LV)	± 4.9%	1%	12%	8%	35%	3%	20%	—	22%
Global Strategy Group (D)	July 30 – August 2, 2026	400 (LV)	—	4%	15%	6%	34%	3%	14%	—	24%
Workbench Strategy (D) (Note: Poll sponsored by Nguyen's campaign)	May 26–27, 2026	400 (LV)	± 4.9%	9%	6%	7%	18%	8%	28%	—	
Center for Strategic Politics (D) (Note: Poll sponsored by Andres-Beck's campaign) (Note: Poll conducted after having people read "balanced biographies" of the candidates)	May 10–15, 2026	487 (LV)	± 4.43%	14%	5%	14%	9%	10%	13%	—	35%
	April 15, 2026	Rick Jakious withdraws									
Schoen Cooperman Research (D) (Note: Poll sponsored by Beccia's campaign)	March 20–24, 2026	450 (LV)	± 4.6%	2%	10%	6%	10%	3%	13%	3% (Note: Rick Jakious with 3%)	46%

==== Results ====
Primary results by town: Koh: 30–40%; 40–50%; 50–60%; Nguyen: 30–40%; 40–50%; 50–60%; Beccia: 30–40%; Belsito: 50–60%

Democratic primary results
Party	Candidate	Votes	%
Democratic	Dan Koh	47,835	40.9
Democratic	Tram Nguyen	34,324	29.4
Democratic	John Beccia	14,215	12.2
Democratic	Jamie Belsito	11,268	9.6
Democratic	Mariah Lancaster (withdrawn)	4,725	4.0
Democratic	Beth Andres-Beck	4,385	3.8
Write-in		156	0.1
Total votes		116,908	100.0

=== Republican primary ===
==== Nominee ====
- Micah Jones, attorney and U.S. Army veteran

==== Endorsements ====
Micah Jones

Statewide officials

- Charlie Baker, former governor of Massachusetts (2015–2023)
- Karyn Polito, former lieutenant governor of Massachusetts (2015–2023)

==== Results ====
Republican primary results
Party	Candidate	Votes	%
Republican	Micah Jones	29,111	99.2
Write-in		225	0.8
Total votes		29,336	100.0

==== Fundraising ====
Campaign finance reports as of June 30, 2026
Candidate	Raised	Spent	Cash on hand
Micah Jones (R)	$400,168 (Note: $0 of this total was self-funded by Jones)	$149,312	$250,856
Source: Federal Election Commission

=== General election ===
==== Post-primary endorsements ====
Dan Koh (D)

U.S representatives

- Jake Auchincloss, MA-04 (2021–present)
- Greg Casar, TX-35 (2023–present)
- Katherine Clark, House minority whip (2023-present) from MA-05 (2013–present)
- Maxwell Frost, FL-10 (2023–present)
- Pramila Jayapal, WA-07 (2017–present)
- Jim McGovern, MA-02 (1997–present)
- Ayanna Pressley, MA-07 (2019–present)
- Lori Trahan, MA-03 (2019–present)

Statewide officials

- Andrea Campbell, attorney general of Massachusetts (2023–present)

Organizations

- Congressional Progressive Caucus PAC

==== Predictions ====
Source	Ranking	As of
Decision Desk HQ	Safe D	July 14, 2026
The Cook Political Report	Solid D	February 6, 2025
Inside Elections	Solid D	March 7, 2025
Sabato's Crystal Ball	Safe D	July 15, 2025
Silver Bulletin	Solid D	August 20, 2026

== District 7 ==
2026 Massachusetts's 7th congressional district election
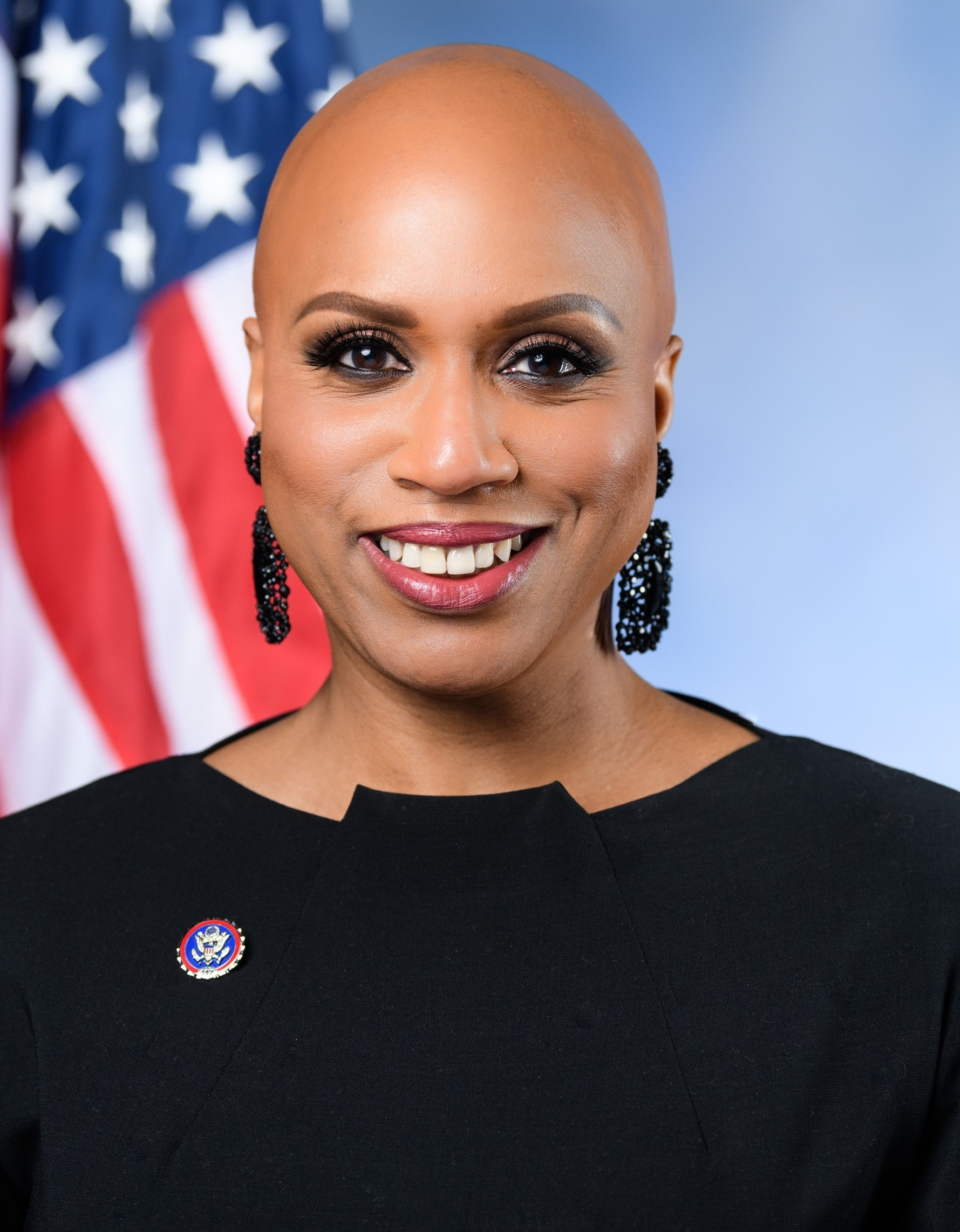
Nominee	Ayanna Pressley
Party	Democratic
- Pressley: 90–100%
U.S. Representative before election
Ayanna Pressley
Democratic
Elected U.S. Representative
Ayanna Pressley
Democratic

The 7th district represents much of Boston and its suburbs. The incumbent is Democrat Ayanna Pressley, who was re-elected uncontested in 2024.

=== Democratic primary ===
==== Nominee ====
- Ayanna Pressley, incumbent U.S. representative

==== Endorsements ====
Ayanna Pressley

Labor unions

- American Federation of Government Employees
- Massachusetts AFL-CIO
- Massachusetts Teachers Association

Organizations

- Reproductive Freedom for All
- Peace Action
- Planned Parenthood Action Fund
- Progressive Democrats of America
- Sierra Club
- Track AIPAC

==== Fundraising ====
Campaign finance reports as of March 31, 2026
Candidate	Raised	Spent	Cash on hand
Ayanna Pressley (D)	$914,493	$894,649	$138,065
Source: Federal Election Commission

==== Results ====
Democratic primary results
Party	Candidate	Votes	%
Democratic	Ayanna Pressley (incumbent)	74,100	98.4
Write-in		1,174	1.6
Total votes		75,274	100.0

=== General election ===
==== Predictions ====
Source	Ranking	As of
Decision Desk HQ	Safe D	July 14, 2026
The Cook Political Report	Solid D	February 6, 2025
Inside Elections	Solid D	March 7, 2025
Sabato's Crystal Ball	Safe D	July 15, 2025
Silver Bulletin	Solid D	August 20, 2026

== District 8 ==
2026 Massachusetts's 8th congressional district election
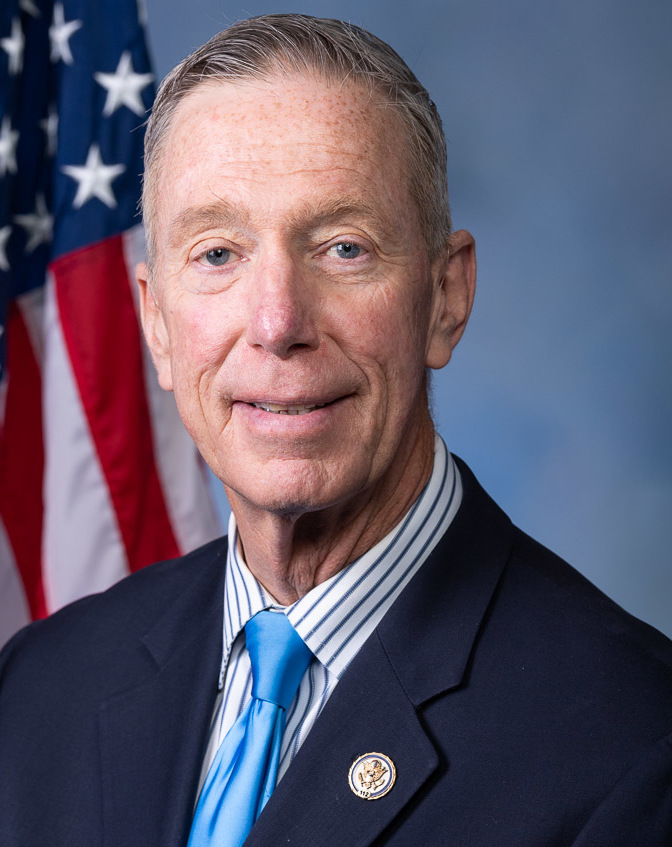

Nominee	Stephen Lynch	Robert Burke
Party	Democratic	Republican
- Lynch: 50–60% 60–70% 70–80%
Incumbent U.S. Representative
Stephen Lynch
Democratic

The 8th district consists of parts of Boston and eastern Massachusetts. The incumbent is Democrat Stephen Lynch, who was re-elected in 2024 after running unopposed.

=== Democratic primary ===
==== Nominee ====
- Stephen Lynch, incumbent U.S. representative

==== Eliminated in primary ====
- Patrick Roath, attorney

==== Withdrawn ====
- Andrew Zylberfink, manager

==== Endorsements ====
Stephen Lynch

Labor unions

- American Federation of Government Employees
- Massachusetts AFL-CIO
- Iron Workers Local 7
- International Brotherhood of Electrical Workers Local 2222
- North Atlantic States Regional Council of Carpenters
- Professional Firefighters of Massachusetts
- UNITE HERE Local 26

Organizations

- J Street
- Planned Parenthood Action Fund
Patrick Roath

Statewide officials

- Deval Patrick, former governor of Massachusetts (2007–2015)

State legislators

- Jay Livingstone, state representative from the 8th Suffolk district (2013–present)
- Sam Montaño, state representative from the 15th Suffolk district (2023–present)
- John F. Moran, state representative from the 9th Suffolk district (2023–present)

Party officials

- David Hogg, former vice chair of the Democratic National Committee (2025)

Labor unions

- American Federation of Teachers Massachusetts
- Boston Teachers Union
- Massachusetts Teachers Association

Organizations

- College Democrats of Massachusetts
- Indivisible
- Leaders We Deserve
- Our Revolution

Newspapers

- The Boston Globe

==== Fundraising ====
Italics indicate a withdrawn candidate.

Campaign finance reports as of August 12, 2026
Candidate	Raised	Spent	Cash on hand
Stephen Lynch (D)	$910,160	$1,356,628	$642,256
Patrick Roath (D)	$1,280,230	$1,060,408	$219,822
Andrew Zylberfink (D)	$1,261	$1,397	$0
Source: Federal Election Commission

==== Polling ====
Poll source	Date(s) administered	Sample size (Note: Key: A – all adults RV – registered voters LV – likely voters V – unclear)	Margin of error	Stephen Lynch	Patrick Roath	Undecided
Z to A Research (D) (Note: Poll sponsored by Leaders We Deserve, which supports Roath)	August 5–6, 2026	469 (LV)	± 4.5%	50%	43%	7%
Z to A Research (D)	July 12, 2026	–	–	54%	32%	14%
Workbench Strategy (D) (Note: Poll sponsored by Roath's campaign)	February 17–19, 2026	400 (LV)	± 4.9%	62%	36%	2%

==== Results ====
Primary results by town: Lynch: 50–60%; 60–70%; Roath: 50–60%

Democratic primary results
Party	Candidate	Votes	%
Democratic	Stephen Lynch (incumbent)	57,823	55.6
Democratic	Patrick Roath	45,946	44.2
Write-in		180	0.2
Total votes		103,949	100.0

=== Republican primary ===
==== Nominee ====
- Robert Burke, videographer and nominee for this district in 2022 and 2024

==== Results ====
Republican primary results
Party	Candidate	Votes	%
Republican	Robert Burke	20,362	99.0
Write-in		212	1.0
Total votes		20,574	100.0

=== Independents ===
==== Declared ====
- Rasheed Nicholas Walters

==== Withdrawn ====
- Michael Hammond, business owner

==== Fundraising ====
Italics indicate a withdrawn candidate.

Campaign finance reports as of March 31, 2026
Candidate	Raised	Spent	Cash on hand
Michael Hammond (I)	$1,800	$1,800	$0
Source: Federal Election Commission

=== General election ===
==== Predictions ====
Source	Ranking	As of
Decision Desk HQ	Safe D	July 14, 2026
The Cook Political Report	Solid D	February 6, 2025
Inside Elections	Solid D	March 7, 2025
Sabato's Crystal Ball	Safe D	July 15, 2025
Silver Bulletin	Solid D	August 20, 2026

== District 9 ==
2026 Massachusetts's 9th congressional district election
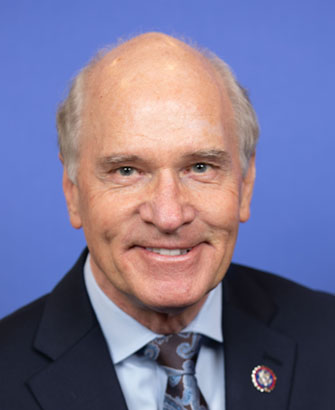

Nominee	Bill Keating	Tyler MacAllister
Party	Democratic	Republican
- Keating: 50–60% 60–70% 70–80% 80–90% 90–100% MacAllister: 50–60%
Incumbent U.S. Representative
Bill Keating
Democratic

The 9th district encompasses Cape Cod and the South Shore, and extends westward into New Bedford and surrounding suburbs. The incumbent is Democrat Bill Keating, who was re-elected with 56.2% of the vote in 2024.

=== Democratic primary ===
==== Nominee ====
- Bill Keating, incumbent U.S. representative

==== Eliminated in primary ====
- Craig Swallow, co-leader of Indivisible South Coast New England

==== Declined ====
- Andrea Campbell, Massachusetts Attorney General (2023–present) (running for re-election)

==== Organizations ====
Bill Keating

Labor unions

- American Federation of Government Employees
- Massachusetts AFL-CIO
- Massachusetts Teachers Association

Organizations

- AIPAC
- J Street
- Planned Parenthood Action Fund
Craig Swallow

Organizations

- Massachusetts Peace Action
- Progressive Democrats of America

==== Fundraising ====
Campaign finance reports as of August 12, 2026
Candidate	Raised	Spent	Cash on hand
Bill Keating (D)	$422,462	$592,807	$495,522
Craig Swallow (D)	$40,503	$33,246	$7,257
Source: Federal Election Commission

==== Results ====
Democratic primary results
Party	Candidate	Votes	%
Democratic	Bill Keating (incumbent)	81,847	77.5
Democratic	Craig Swallow	23,671	22.4
Write-in		96	0.1
Total votes		105,614	100.0

=== Republican primary ===
==== Nominee ====
- Tyler MacAllister, former Mattapoisett selectman

==== Fundraising ====
Campaign finance reports as of March 31, 2026
Candidate	Raised	Spent	Cash on hand
Tyler MacAllister (R)	$143,181	$88,365	$54,816
Source: Federal Election Commission

==== Results ====
Republican primary results
Party	Candidate	Votes	%
Republican	Tyler MacAllister	40,104	99.3
Write-in		278	0.7
Total votes		40,382	100.0

=== General election ===
==== Predictions ====
Source	Ranking	As of
Decision Desk HQ	Safe D	July 14, 2026
The Cook Political Report	Solid D	February 6, 2025
Inside Elections	Solid D	March 7, 2025
Sabato's Crystal Ball	Safe D	July 15, 2025
Silver Bulletin	Solid D	August 20, 2026

== Notes ==
Partisan clients
