= John Deaton =

American attorney and political candidate

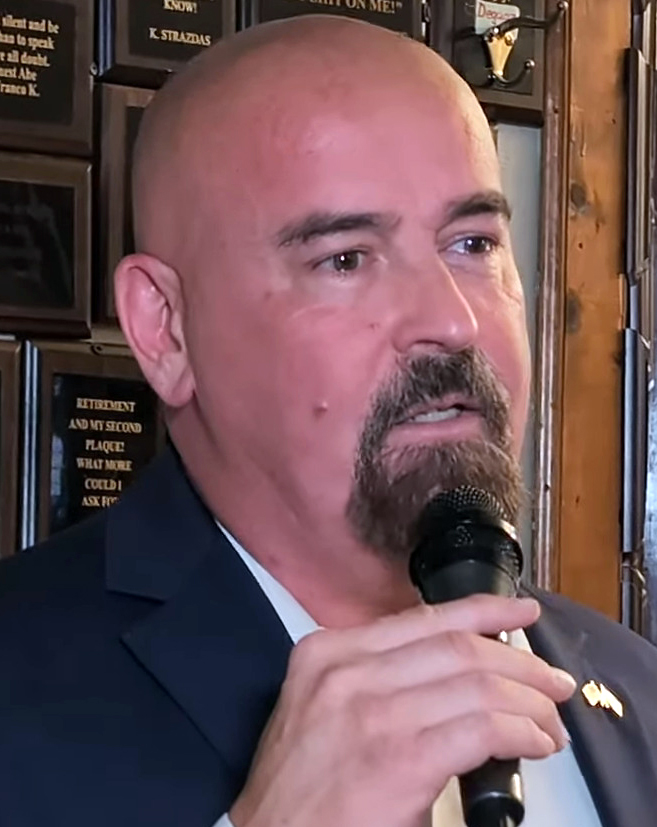
- Deaton in 2024

Personal details
- Born: 1966 or 1967 (age 59–60) Highland Park, Michigan, U.S.
- Party: Republican
- Children: 3
- Education: Eastern Michigan University (BA); New England Law Boston (JD)
- Website: Campaign website

John E. Deaton (born 1967) is an American attorney and political candidate. He was the Republican nominee in the 2024 United States Senate election in Massachusetts and the 2026 United States Senate election in Massachusetts, losing to incumbent Democratic senators Elizabeth Warren and Ed Markey, respectively.

== Early life, education, and military service ==
Born in Highland Park, Michigan, an enclave of Detroit, Deaton and five siblings were raised by a single mother. He has described his childhood as marked by poverty and violence, with his family relying in part on food stamps and welfare. He dropped out of high school, but later returned to finish his education, and was the first in his family to graduate from high school.

Deaton received a B.A., magna cum laude, from Eastern Michigan University in 1989, and while attending the university was diagnosed with testicular cancer, for which he underwent treatment while continuing his studies. He received a J.D. from the New England School of Law in Boston in 1995.

While attending law school, Deaton joined the United States Marine Corps and served for seven years as both a prosecutor and defense attorney in the United States Marine Corps Judge Advocate Division, also teaching evidence law and trial advocacy at the Naval Justice School and Naval War College in Newport, Rhode Island, before being medically retired from the Marine Corps in 2002, due to a non-combat injury.

== Legal career ==
After leaving the Marine Corps, Deaton joined a plaintiffs' law firm specializing in mesothelioma litigation, where he remained for four years, until March 2006, when he established the Deaton Law Firm in East Providence, Rhode Island, representing plaintiffs in asbestos and mesothelioma cases. In the 2018 "take-home" asbestos case of Nichols v. Allis Chalmers Product Liability Trust, Deaton represented a woman who alleged that asbestos fibers brought home on a family member's work clothing caused her mesothelioma, successfully obtaining a ruling from the Rhode Island Superior Court that a premises owner could owe a duty of care to a household member foreseeably exposed to asbestos brought home by a worker.

Deaton began investing in cryptocurrency in 2017 and subsequently became involved in litigation concerning the regulation of digital assets. When the U.S. Securities and Exchange Commission sued Ripple Labs in 2020 over an alleged unregistered offering of digital asset securities involving the XRP token, Deaton filed a petition for a writ of mandamus in the United States District Court for the District of Rhode Island, seeking to limit SEC claims to Ripple and exclude individual investors who had purchased and sold XRP on the secondary market. The SEC argued that the United States District Court for the Southern District of New York had exclusive jurisdiction over the dispute, and Deaton sought to intervene in the SEC's case against Ripple on behalf of XRP holders, leading the court to appoint Deaton as amicus curiae counsel, allowing him to participate in the case on behalf of over 75,000 XRP holders. Deaton handled the case pro bono, and in July 2023, judge Analisa Torres ruled on cross-motions for summary judgment, agreeing with Deaton's position that XRP was not in itself a contract, transaction, or scheme satisfying the requirements of an investment contract. For his work in the case, Rhode Island Lawyers Weekly named Deaton one of its 2023 Lawyers of the Year.

Deaton also represented several thousand customers of cryptocurrency exchange Coinbase, in separate litigation brought against that company by the SEC. In 2025, Deaton argued that China's dominance in the manufacture of Bitcoin mining equipment creates a potential vulnerability for U.S. users and investors, warning that Chinese restrictions on exports or manipulation of supply could disrupt the Bitcoin network.

== Political activity ==
Deaton lived in Barrington, Rhode Island, before moving to Massachusetts in January 2024, shortly before entering the race for the U.S. Senate.

In the 2024 United States Senate election in Massachusetts, Deaton ran as an anti-Trump centrist Republican. He stated his support for abortion rights, saying that he disagreed with the Supreme Court's decision in Dobbs v. Jackson Women's Health Organization, and also supported same-sex marriage and Massachusetts's gun laws, and said that climate change should be addressed through a combination of solar, wind, hydroelectric, and nuclear power, while opposing efforts to reach net-zero emissions by 2050, which he believed would eliminate jobs. Deaton also cited Warren's support for regulation of cryptocurrencies as a motivation to run against her. Deaton defeated two other candidates to win the Republican nomination in September 2024.

He was endorsed by entrepreneur Mark Cuban, former White House Communications Director Anthony Scaramucci, and Karyn Polito, former Lieutenant Governor of Massachusetts, as well as by the Massachusetts College Republicans. Warren defeated Deaton in the November general election, receiving 59.9 percent of the vote to Deaton's 40.1 percent.

In November 2025, Deaton declared his candidacy again for the 2026 United States Senate election in Massachusetts, challenging incumbent Democrat Ed Markey, receiving primary endorsements from the Log Cabin Republicans, and the Massachusetts Republican Party, which endorsed Deaton early to reduce chances of there being a contested primary. In May 2026, months before the primary, Deaton as the Republican presumptive nominee challenged the two main Democratic candidates, Markey and representative Seth Moulton, to a three-way debate. Moulton agreed to the debate, which was scheduled for June, and which was reported to be the first-ever interparty primary debate in Massachusetts. Markey did not attend. In the debate, Deaton sought to distance himself from both major parties, saying that he had never voted for Trump and had no loyalty to a political party.

On September 1, 2026, Deaton won the Republican primary, running unopposed, setting up a general election match with Markey, who won the Democratic primary. Markey defeated Deaton by a substantial margin.

== Electoral history ==
2024 United States Senate election in Massachusetts Republican primary
Party	Candidate	Votes	%
Republican	John Deaton	136,773	64.80%
Republican	Robert Antonellis	54,940	26.03%
Republican	Ian Cain	19,374	9.18%
Total votes		211,087	100%

2024 United States Senate election in Massachusetts
Party	Candidate	Votes	%	±%
Democratic	Elizabeth Warren (incumbent)	2,041,693	59.90%	−0.14
Republican	John Deaton	1,365,445	40.10%	+3.93
Total votes		3,407,138	100%	
Democratic hold				

2026 United States Senate election in Massachusetts Republican primary
Party	Candidate	Votes	%
Republican	John Deaton	TBD	100%

2026 United States Senate election in Massachusetts
Party	Candidate	Votes	%	±%
Democratic	Ed Markey (incumbent)	1,653,828	63.40%	TBA
Republican	John Deaton	838,035	32.13%	TBA
Total votes		TBA	TBA	
Democratic hold				

== Personal life ==
Deaton is reportedly a "cancer survivor and the father of three daughters". He and his wife, Maria F. Deaton, divorced in 2007. In 2023, he published the memoir Food Stamp Warrior, describing his childhood, military and legal careers, and his formative experiences with poverty, abuse and violence. The memoir also details Deaton committing statutory rape of a 15-year-old girl, as well as a potential homicide.

Party political offices
Preceded by Geoff Diehl	Republican nominee for U.S. Senator from Massachusetts (Class 1); 2024	Most recent
Preceded by Kevin O'Connor	Republican nominee for U.S. Senator from Massachusetts (Class 2); 2026	Most recent
