= 2024 United States Senate election in Massachusetts =

- November 5, 2024
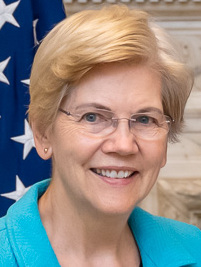

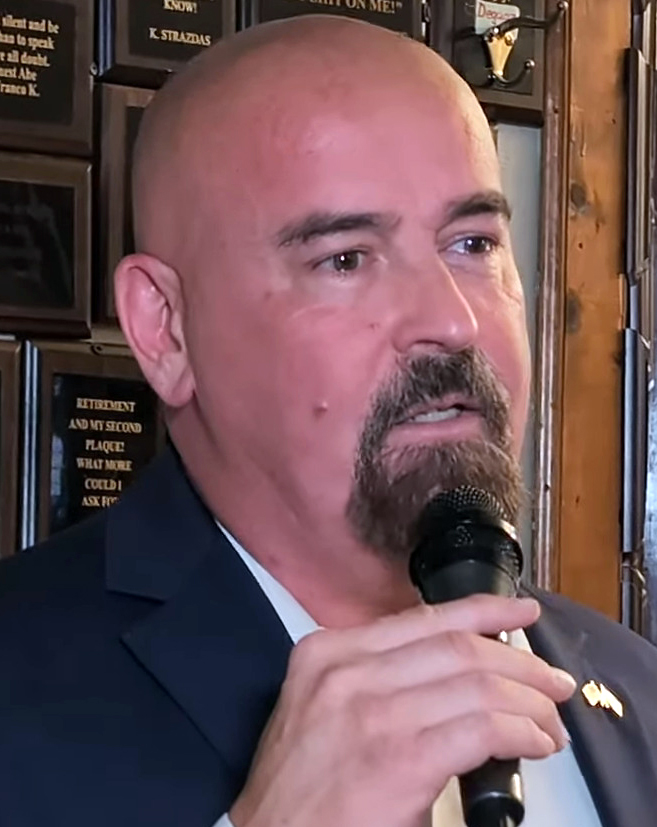
Nominee	Elizabeth Warren	John Deaton
Party	Democratic	Republican
Popular vote	2,041,668	1,365,440
Percentage	59.81%	40.00%
- Warren: 40–50% 50–60% 60–70% 70–80% 80–90% >90% Deaton: 40–50% 50–60% 60–70% No votes
U.S. senator before election
Elizabeth Warren
Democratic
Elected U.S. Senator
Elizabeth Warren
Democratic

The 2024 United States Senate election in Massachusetts took place on November 5, 2024. Democratic incumbent Senator Elizabeth Warren successfully ran for a third term, securing 59.81% of the vote. Warren was challenged by Republican attorney John Deaton. Primary elections took place on September 3, 2024.

This election marked the first time that Warren had lost Bristol County while running for the office. Warren underperformed Kamala Harris by 6 points in the concurrent presidential election, making her the second-worst Democratic Senate performer in the 2024 cycle after Angela Alsobrooks in Maryland.

Warren received 84,850 (1.4 percent) votes fewer than Harris. John Deaton ran as an anti-Trump centrist Republican.

== Democratic primary ==
=== Candidates ===
==== Nominee ====
- Elizabeth Warren, incumbent U.S. senator (2013–present)

==== Declined ====
- Jake Auchincloss, U.S. representative for Massachusetts's 4th congressional district (2021–present) (ran for re-election)
- Seth Moulton, U.S. representative for Massachusetts's 6th congressional district (2015–present) (ran for re-election)
- Ayanna Pressley, U.S. representative for Massachusetts's 7th congressional district (2019–present) (endorsed Warren, ran for re-election)
- Michelle Wu, mayor of Boston (2021–present) (endorsed Warren)

=== Endorsements ===
Elizabeth Warren

U.S. senators

- Ed Markey, Massachusetts (2013–present)

U.S. representatives

- Gabby Giffords, AZ-08 (2007–2012)
- Ayanna Pressley, MA-07 (2019–present)

State officials

- Maura Healey, Governor of Massachusetts (2023–present)

Local officials

- Michelle Wu, mayor of Boston (2021–present)

Organizations

- EMILY's List
- Feminist Majority PAC
- Giffords
- Harvard College Democrats
- Humane Society Legislative Fund
- J Street PAC
- Joint Action Committee for Political Affairs
- League of Conservation Voters
- National Women's Political Caucus
- Natural Resources Defense Council
- Planned Parenthood Action Fund
- Population Connection Action Fund
- Progressive Change Campaign Committee

Labor unions

- Association of Flight Attendants
- United Farm Workers

Political parties

- Working Families Party

=== Fundraising ===
Campaign finance reports as of June 30, 2024
Candidate	Raised	Spent	Cash on hand
Elizabeth Warren (D)	$18,486,081	$24,658,143	$4,920,625
Source: Federal Election Commission

=== Results ===
Democratic primary results
Party	Candidate	Votes	%
Democratic	Elizabeth Warren (incumbent)	562,709	98.58%
Write-in		8,078	1.42%
Total votes		570,787	100.0%

== Republican primary ==
=== Candidates ===
==== Nominee ====
- John Deaton, attorney

==== Eliminated in primary ====
- Robert Antonellis, nutrition software company owner and self-professed conspiracy theorist
- Ian Cain, president of the Quincy City Council

==== Declined ====
- Charlie Baker, former Governor of Massachusetts from 2015 to 2023
- Chris Doughty, manufacturing executive and candidate for governor in 2022

=== Endorsements ===
Ian Cain

Governors

- Jane Swift, former Governor of Massachusetts (2001–2003)

Local Officials

- Thomas Koch, Mayor of Quincy (2008–present)
John Deaton

Executive Branch officials

- Anthony Scaramucci, former White House Director of Communications (2017)

Statewide officials

- Karyn Polito, former Lieutenant Governor of Massachusetts (2015–2023)

Individuals

- Mark Cuban, entrepreneur (Independent)

Organizations

- Massachusetts College Republicans

=== Fundraising ===
Campaign finance reports as of June 30, 2024
Candidate	Raised	Spent	Cash on hand
Robert Antonellis (R)	$43,352 (Note: $24,296 of this total was self-funded by Antonellis)	$37,250	$9,667
Ian Cain (R)	$361,115	$312,722	$48,393
John Deaton (R)	$1,690,411 (Note: $1,000,000 of this total was self-funded by Deaton)	$715,642	$974,769
Source: Federal Election Commission

=== Polling ===
Poll source	Date(s) administered	Sample size (Note: Key: A – all adults RV – registered voters LV – likely voters V – unclear)	Margin of error	Robert Antonellis	Ian Cain	John Deaton	Other	Undecided
YouGov (Note: Poll commissioned by the University of Massachusetts Amherst and WCVB-TV)	May 17–30, 2024	292 (A)	± 4.4%	19%	5%	15%	25% (Note: Aaron Packard with 9%; "Other" with 16%)	36%
Suffolk University (Note: Poll commissioned by The Boston Globe)	April 16–20, 2024	99(LV)	± 4.4%	4%	2%	4%	1% (Note: Aaron Packard with 1%)	89%

=== Results ===
Results by municipality: Deaton—90–100% Deaton—80–90% Deaton—70–80% Deaton—60–70% Deaton—50–60% Antonellis—50–60% Antonellis—40–50% Cain—40–50% No Data/Vote

Republican primary results
Party	Candidate	Votes	%
Republican	John Deaton	136,773	64.51%
Republican	Robert Antonellis	54,940	25.91%
Republican	Ian Cain	19,374	9.14%
Write-in		924	0.44%
Total votes		212,011	100.0%

== Workers Party primary ==
=== Candidates ===
==== Withdrawn ====
- Brandon Griffin

== Libertarian primary ==
=== Candidates ===
==== Withdrew ====
- Louis Marino, former Chelmsford town meeting representative

== General election ==
=== Predictions ===
Source	Ranking	As of
The Cook Political Report	Solid D	November 9, 2023
Inside Elections	Solid D	November 9, 2023
Sabato's Crystal Ball	Safe D	November 9, 2023
Decision Desk HQ/The Hill	Safe D	June 8, 2024
Elections Daily	Safe D	May 4, 2023
CNalysis	Solid D	November 21, 2023
RealClearPolitics	Solid D	August 5, 2024
Split Ticket	Safe D	October 23, 2024
538	Solid D	October 23, 2024

=== Post-primary endorsements ===
John Deaton (R)

Statewide officials

- Bill Weld, former Governor of Massachusetts (1991–1997)

Notable Individuals

- Elon Musk, CEO of Tesla and SpaceX
- Mark Cuban, entrepreneur, Dallas Mavericks owner, philanthropist (Independent)
- Brad Garlinghouse, CEO of Ripple
- Chris Larsen, co-founder of Ripple (Democrat)

Newspapers

- Boston Herald

Organizations

- Log Cabin Republicans
- New England Police Benevolent Association nonprofit

=== Polling ===
Aggregate polls

Source of poll aggregation	Dates administered	Dates updated	Elizabeth Warren (D)	John Deaton (R)	Undecided (Note: Calculated by taking the difference of 100% and all other candidates combined.)	Margin
538	through November 2, 2024	November 3, 2024	57.0%	34.8%	8.2%	Warren +22.2%
RealClearPolitics	September 12 - October 26, 2024	November 3, 2024	56.5%	34.3%	9.2%	Warren +22.2%
270toWin	October 8 - November 3, 2024	November 3, 2024	57.5%	34.8%	7.7%	Warren +22.7%
TheHill/DDHQ	through November 2, 2024	November 3, 2024	58.4%	36.1%	5.5%	Warren +22.3%
Average			57.4%	35.0%	7.6%	Warren+22.4%

Poll source	Date(s) administered	Sample size	Margin of error	Elizabeth Warren (D)	John Deaton (R)	Other	Undecided
University of New Hampshire	October 29 – November 2, 2024	744 (LV)	± 3.6%	60%	37%	–	3%
MassINC Polling Group	October 29 – November 1, 2024	582 (LV)	± 4.9%	55%	33%	8% (Note: "Another candidate" with 3%, "Would not vote for Senate" with 3%, "Prefer not to say" with 2%)	4%
ActiVote	October 2–30, 2024	400 (LV)	± 4.9%	63%	37%	–	–
Emerson College (Note: Poll sponsored by WHDH)	October 24–26, 2024	1,000 (LV)	± 3.0%	56%	36%	1% (Note: "Someone else" with 1%)	7%
UMass Amherst/YouGov/WCVB	October 3–10, 2024	700 (A)	± 4.8%	56%	34%	3% (Note: "Other" with 3%)	7%
Suffolk University (Note: Poll sponsored by The Boston Globe)	October 2–6, 2024	500 (LV)	± 4.4%	59%	35%	–	6%
Opinion Diagnostics (R) (Note: Poll sponsored by Deaton's campaign)	September 19–21, 2024	638 (LV)	–	53%	32%	–	15%
MassINC Polling Group (Note: Poll sponsored by WBUR-FM and CommonWealth Beacon)	September 12–18, 2024	800 (LV)	± 4.1%	56%	35%	3% (Note: "Another candidate" with 1%, "Wouldn't Vote" with 1%, "Prefer not to say" with 1%)	7%
University of New Hampshire	September 12–16, 2024	564 (LV)	± 4.1%	58%	32%	7% (Note: "Another candidate" with 7%)	3%
YouGov	May 17–30, 2023	700 (A)	± 4.4%	47%	24%	8% (Note: "Would not vote" with 8%)	21%

Hypothetical polling

Elizabeth Warren vs. Robert Antonellis

Poll source	Date(s) administered	Sample size	Margin of error	Elizabeth Warren (D)	Robert Antonellis (R)	Other/Undecided
YouGov	May 17–30, 2023	700 (A)	± 4.4%	50%	23%	27%

Elizabeth Warren vs. Charlie Baker

Poll source	Date(s) administered	Sample size	Margin of error	Elizabeth Warren (D)	Charlie Baker (R)	Undecided
Fiscal Alliance Foundation	May 6–7, 2023	750 (LV)	± 3.6%	34%	49%	17%

Elizabeth Warren vs. Ian Cain

Poll source	Date(s) administered	Sample size	Margin of error	Elizabeth Warren (D)	Ian Cain (R)	Other/Undecided
YouGov	May 17–30, 2023	700 (A)	± 4.4%	48%	24%	28%

Elizabeth Warren vs. Jonathan Kraft

Poll source	Date(s) administered	Sample size	Margin of error	Elizabeth Warren (D)	Johnathan Kraft (R)	Undecided
Suffolk University	February 2–5, 2023	1000 (LV)	± 3.1%	56%	33%	11%

Elizabeth Warren vs. Aaron Packard

Poll source	Date(s) administered	Sample size	Margin of error	Elizabeth Warren (D)	Aaron Packard (R)	Other/Undecided
YouGov	May 17–30, 2023	700 (A)	± 4.4%	48%	23%	29%

Elizabeth Warren vs. Karyn Polito

Poll source	Date(s) administered	Sample size	Margin of error	Elizabeth Warren (D)	Karyn Polito (R)	Undecided
Fiscal Alliance Foundation	July 21–22, 2023	750 (LV)	± 3.6%	41%	29%	30%

=== Results ===
2024 United States Senate election in Massachusetts
Party	Candidate	Votes	%	±%
Democratic	Elizabeth Warren (incumbent)	2,041,668	59.81%	−0.53
Republican	John Deaton	1,365,440	40.00%	+3.83
Write-in		6,221	0.18%	+0.08
Total votes		3,413,329	100.00%	N/A
Democratic hold				

==== By county ====
By county

County	Elizabeth Warren Democratic		John Deaton Republican		All others	
County	#	%	#	%	#	%
Barnstable	81,395	55.26	65,709	44.61	183	0.12
Berkshire	46,803	70.01	19,984	29.89	65	0.1
Bristol	134,451	49.55	136,530	50.32	352	0.13
Dukes	8,792	72.89	3,260	27.03	10	0.08
Essex	228,303	57.83	165,907	42.03	568	0.14
Franklin	27,921	66.93	13,737	32.93	57	0.14
Hampden	110,375	53.99	93,677	45.83	370	0.18
Hampshire	58,099	69.29	25,644	30.58	108	0.13
Middlesex	532,646	66.54	266,265	33.27	1,523	0.19
Nantucket	4,513	64.47	2,479	35.41	8	0.11
Norfolk	225,378	59.25	154,068	40.51	920	0.24
Plymouth	147,813	49.86	148,292	50.02	341	0.12
Suffolk	219,769	75.41	70,676	24.25	1,006	0.35
Worcester	215,410	51.86	199,212	47.96	710	0.17
Totals	2,041,668	59.81	1,365,440	40.0	6,221	0.18

Counties that flipped from Democratic to Republican

- Bristol (largest municipality: New Bedford)

==== By congressional district ====
Warren won all nine congressional districts.

District	Warren	Deaton	Representative
1st	56%	44%	Richard Neal
2nd	59%	41%	Jim McGovern
3rd	58%	42%	Lori Trahan
4th	56%	44%	Jake Auchincloss
5th	70%	30%	Katherine Clark
6th	57%	43%	Seth Moulton
7th	82%	18%	Ayanna Pressley
8th	59%	40%	Stephen Lynch
9th	51%	49%	Bill Keating

== Notes ==
Partisan clients
