= Jared C. Nicholson =

American mayor (born 1985)

Jared Nicholson
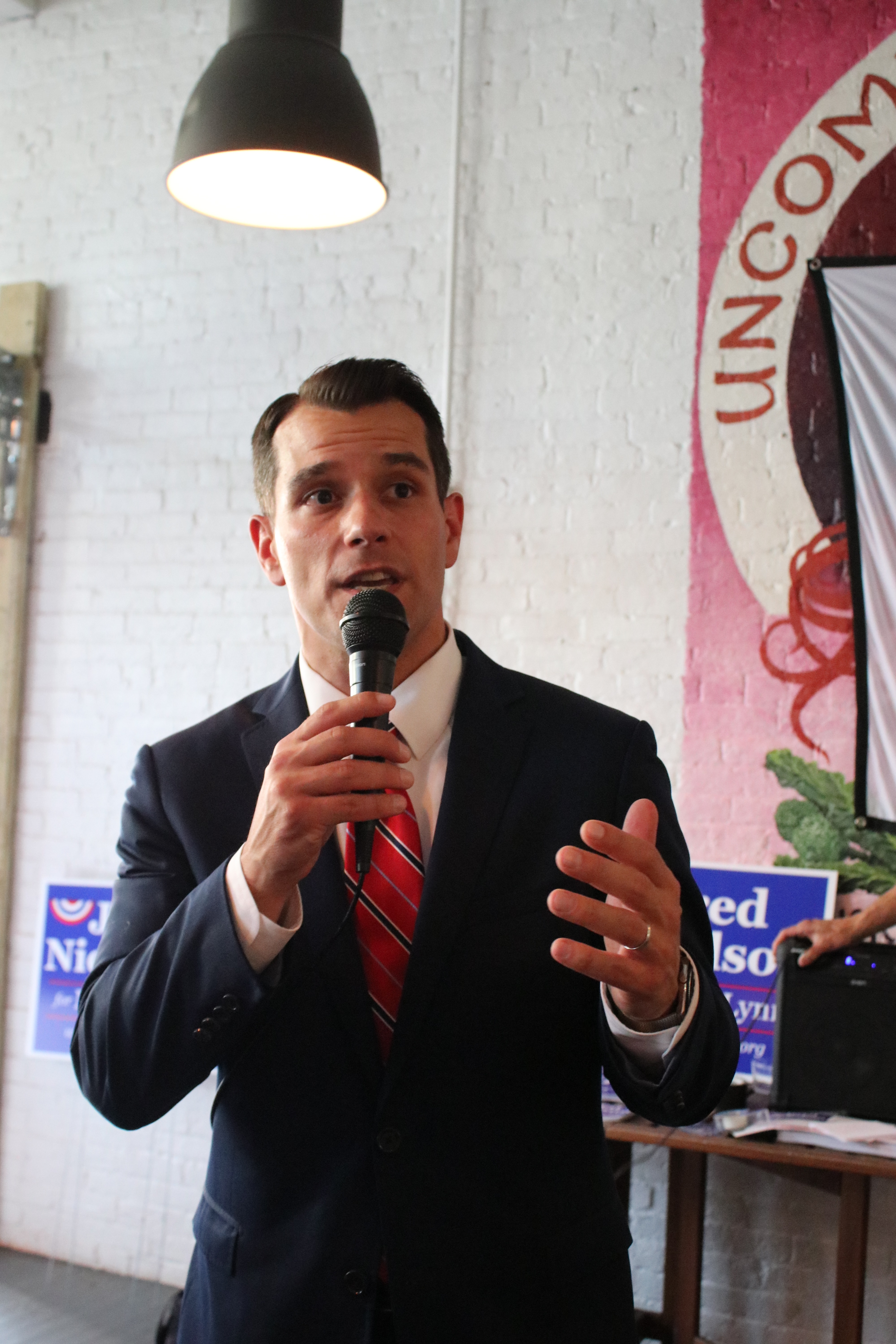

58th Mayor of Lynn
- Incumbent
- Assumed office January 4, 2022
- Preceded by: Thomas M. McGee

Personal details
- Born: December 3, 1985 (age 40) Framingham, Massachusetts, U.S.
- Party: Democratic
- Education: Princeton University (BA); Harvard University (JD)

Jared C. Nicholson (born December 3, 1985) is the 59th Mayor of the City of Lynn, Massachusetts.

== Early life and education ==
Nicholson was born on December 3, 1985, in Framingham, Massachusetts to Stephen and Lindsay Nicholson. He and his younger brother were raised in Sudbury. He attended Lincoln-Sudbury Regional High School, graduating in 2004. He went on to graduate from Princeton University summa cum laude in the Princeton School of Public and International Affairs in 2008. He earned his Juris Doctor cum laude from Harvard Law School in 2014, where he was executive director of the Harvard Legal Aid Bureau. Nicholson is bilingual in English and Spanish.

== Career ==
Nicholson received the Skadden Fellowship out of Harvard Law School, and designed, launched, and led a new community economic development practice in Lynn, Massachusetts. Here he represented underserved communities in entrepreneurial and small business legal matters. He also helped make recommendations adopted by the Lynn City Council to support economic development in the city. In 2016 he was elected to the Lynn School Committee, serving three two-year terms. During that time, he helped develop a new initiative for students across the district to learn job skills after school, and founded the city's wrestling team.

Since 2016, Nicholson, who wrestled at Princeton, has hosted a beach wrestling tournament every summer to support Lynn wrestling. Prior to being elected Mayor, Nicholson worked as a business lawyer for startups at Latham & Watkins and later as a law professor at Northeastern University, where he worked with and researched small businesses. He stopped teaching once elected as Mayor.

=== Mayor of Lynn ===
==== First Term ====
In 2021, Nicholson was elected mayor of Lynn defeating City Council President Darren Cyr in all 28 precincts of the city. Cyr had a significant fundraising advantage over Nicholson and Paris Alston of GBH reflected that "[s]ome wondered if Nicholson was too new to the city to become its top executive. But voters were persuaded by his ideas around the city's growth and development being inclusive for all."

===== Housing =====
One of the major policy issues in the campaign was affordable housing. Upon taking office, Nicholson made the cost of housing one of his administration's top priorities. In his first year in office, Nicholson delivered on a campaign commitment to deliver inclusionary zoning, working with the City Council, that has been calibrated to encourage continued growth while also creating affordable housing for Lynn residents. He also created an affordable housing trust fund with the City Council that has funded projects creating hundreds of affordable units. Property tax relief programs for senior citizens and veterans were increased by Nicholson's administration. Nicholson worked with the City Council to pass a housing stability ordinance to help make sure tenants are aware of their rights and available resources.

Governor Healey appointed Nicholson to her administration's statewide Housing Advisory Council, which produced the first ever statewide housing plan.

===== Education =====
Another of Nicholson's top priorities during his first term was the conditions of Lynn's schools. The Mayor also serves as the Chairperson of the School Committee of the Lynn Public Schools. To alleviate overcrowding, Nicholson is leading a multi-year process to build a new middle school scheduled to open in 2028 and worked with the state legislative delegation to improve state funding for school projects to make the project feasible. He focused on expanding access to quality pre-K education, with Lynn Public Schools adding 97 seats for the 2023 school year and another 118 for 2024. By 2025, the Lynn Public Schools had quadrupled the number of full-day pre-K seats.

Through the creative use of existing buildings, the City was able to add seats in alternative programs equivalent to building a new high school, increasing educational options for students and relieving overcrowding at the comprehensive high schools. In 2022 the Frederick Douglass Collegiate Academy, a pioneering partnership between the Lynn Public Schools and North Shore Community college that gives high school students the opportunity to attend college-level courses at no cost to them while still enrolled in high school, was initially opened on North Shore Community College's campus and then moved the former Eastern Bank headquarters that was purchased by the City. Lynn Public Schools moved the Harold Durgin Success Academy to the same bank building which allowed for the opening of a new design-focused secondary school devoted to science, technology, engineering, arts, and mathematics (or "STEAM") in the former Classical building on Lynn Commons. Moving the TEAMS special education program to another city-owned building that was renovated to meet the TEAMS program's needs allowed another 200 seats to be added to Lynn Vocational and Technical Institute, allowing for the addition of new shops, including biotechnology.

===== Economic Development =====
Nicholson made bringing good-paying jobs to Lynn a priority, including a major increase in the City's involvement in workforce development through programs such as funding Commercial Driver's License training to fill a City hiring need, expanding access to English classes, and supporting the vocational school's expansion of adult education in high demand trades.

One of Nicholson's first accomplishments in office was to reform the City's development process, working with the City Council, to allow for a more coherent and coordinated review by City officials. Nicholson also led the creation of the City's first comprehensive plan, "Vision Lynn." To reflect the goals articulated in Vision Lynn, in 2025 the City rewrote its zoning ordinance for the first time since adopted in 1926.

Another outgrowth of Vision Lynn was the South Harbor Implementation Plan, a planning process for Lynn's waterfront, a focal point for inclusive growth and the subject of an extensive, coordinated planning effort that has begun to become reality by attracting major investment. The City approved what would be the largest private sector development in the City's history, a $450 million mixed-use development of 850 units, 26,000 square feet of commercial space, and an 8-acre public park. A new 20+ acre public park opened on the waterfront on the site of a former landfill in 2025.

===== Community Safety and Inclusion =====
Nicholson has made inclusivity a hallmark of his Administration, leading an effort to improve language access to city services for multilingual residents by hiring a team of interpreters. His administration launched an independent, unarmed crisis response team to address mental health needs and further racial justice. Nicholson also increased the availability and utilization of lifesaving Nalaxone as part of the efforts to combat the opioid crisis and the City has experienced a promising downward trend in opioid overdose deaths. The schools dramatically increased their mental health support for students through the hiring of social workers and clinicians. A third party "equity audit" found that the City had made significant progress improving accessibility and inclusion.

In 2023, the City experienced a dangerous flare-up of gang violence. By 2025, law enforcement had dismantled the most threatening gang and successfully suppressed the wave of violence. The Nicholson administration instituted a door-to-door canvassing program for City officials to visit neighborhoods experiencing community violence, launched a mentor connection program, installed a community camera system at public intersections, and drastically expanded summer youth jobs.

Nicholson has repeatedly spoke out against the immigration enforcement tactics used by the Trump Administration and defended the contributions of Lynn's large immigrant population.

===== Infrastructure =====
Nicholson focused on improving the City's infrastructure, including major upgrades to the City's streets, an overhaul of the parks system, a noticeable escalation in the City's efforts to combat litter, decorative lighting for the City's train underpasses and downtown streets, the hiring of a full-time energy manager to improve energy efficiency, the establishment of a new senior center, and the rehabilitation of the Grand Army of the Republic Building and Fayette Street Fire Station. Nicholson has also overseen a marked improvement in the City's financial status, an area where it had long struggled, attaining a credit rating upgrade from Standard & Poor's from A to A+ and paying off ahead of schedule the debt the City had previously issued under state oversight to balance its budget. The Nicholson Administration led a rewrite of the City's charter that was approved in 2025 that modernized city governance, returned more home rule authority to the City, and enabled the City to make decisions more efficiently.

Nicholson has worked with the City's legislative delegation to successfully advocate for the return of the Lynn ferry service and a temporary platform after Lynn's commuter rail station was closed, as well as future expansion of service and electrification for near-rapid transit service.

The Nicholson Administration has led attempts to clean one of the last remaining consistently polluted beaches in Greater Boston, King's Beach, including a successful, innovative pilot of UV technology with the Town of Swampscott. Nicholson also finalized a conservation restriction for Lynn Woods, a 2,200 acre municipal forest park, permanently guaranteeing its preservation.

==== Second Term ====
In December 2024, Nicholson announced his intention to run for reelection. He ended up running unopposed and was reelected to a second term on November 4, 2025.

===== Housing =====
In his second term, Nicholson has continued advancing the production of housing, with Lynn becoming among Greater Boston’s largest housing producers. New projects breaking ground included Lynn’s first private affordable ownership project (located downtown on Market Street), a deeply affordable project with wrap-around services, and senior housing at the former Union Hospital.

===== Education =====
In June 2026, the new Frederick Douglass Collegiate Academy graduated its first senior class, including dozens of high school seniors who received both their high school diploma and associates degree from North Shore Community College. The renovation and conversion of 195 Market Street from a bank office to two schools (Frederick Douglass Collegiate Academy and Harold Durgin Success Academy) was completed for the 2026-2027 school year.

Lynn Public Schools’ new STEAM school, the City Arts and Sciences Academy (CASA) entered its second year and received a $250,000 grant. The district also developed a partnership between CASA and UMass Lowell to expand college and career pathways for students in science, technology, engineering, and math.

Lynn expanded its bilingual education program from elementary to middle school as the students who started the bilingual program as kindergarteners in 2020 entered Marshall Middle School as sixth graders in 2026.

Due to the increase in the number of LPS pre-K seats, a Nicholson Administration priority, the waitlist for four-year-olds was exhausted and the School Committee opened enrollment for three-year-olds.

Another of Nicholson’s educational priorities has been the addition of vocational seats and programs at Lynn Vocational Technical Institute, which opened new programs in construction craft laborers and environmental sciences.

===== Economic Development =====
Working with the Lynn City Council, Nicholson reconstituted the Lynn Redevelopment Authority to advance economic development on parcels on the waterfront with high potential but stunted progress and achieve the goals of the City’s South Harbor Implementation Plan. The new Lynn Redevelopment Authority received a state grant to hire a consultant to lead a process for the creation of an urban renewal plan.

Progress on access to the waterfront continued with the addition of a coastline pedestrian path along the harbor that connects Lynn Veterans Memorial Park, adjacent to the City’s downtown, to the ferry terminal on the Lynnway.

===== Community Safety and Inclusion =====
Mayor Nicholson has sought to prevent the recurrence of retaliatory gang violence by convening youth-serving organizations to address the root causes of community violence, launching the Youth Safety & Opportunity Collaborative in February 2026. He has continued his commitment to summer youth employment with additional programming for participants on topics such as financial literacy.

Nicholson funded the launch of a new motorcycle unit at the Lynn Police Department to support traffic control and community engagement.

In June 2026, the Nicholson Administration marked the one-year anniversary of the launch of the independent, unarmed alternative to police response, the Lynn Calm Team, marking over 1,000 service calls and resident interactions in its first year.

Mayor Nicholson has continued to take action to support Lynn’s immigrant community, issuing an executive order prohibiting civil immigration enforcement on City property, launching a community relief fund that provides assistance to affected families, and establishing a partnership with community advocates and the local legal aid provider to increase access to immigration legal aid.

===== Infrastructure =====
As a follow-up to the reform of the City’s Charter in 2025, the Nicholson Administration, working with the City Council, implemented a reorganization plan for City Hall in the form of a new administrative code that introduced a cabinet structure to streamline operations and increase accountability.

In 2026, Nicholson oversaw the completion of key accessibility improvements and restoration work at the Grand Army of the Republic Hall, a new turf athletic complex at McManus Field, a renovation of the Fayette Street Fire Station, and the renovation and opening of the second floor of the Senior Center. The Lynn Water & Sewer Commission also completed a $120 million combined sewer separation project in West Lynn.

Analysis of the results from the 2025 UV pilot at King’s Beach showed that the water cleared the safe-swimming threshold 90% of the summer, a marked improvement from prior years. For the summer of 2026, Nicholson led a collaborative follow-on study with the Town of Swampscott to continue the efforts to permanently clean the beach.

==== Recognition ====
Mayor Nicholson and his Administration have received multiple awards for leadership and distinctive performance during his time in office.

In 2024, Nicholson was awarded the Mayor Carpenter Award for Excellence in Gateway City Leadership by MassInc.

The Nicholson Administration’s comprehensive plan for the City, “Vision Lynn,” was awarded the Unbuilt Planning & Design Honor Award from the Boston Society of Architects, the highest award in the category, in 2024 and the Visionary Award from the Congress for New Urbanism’s New England chapter in 2023.

In January 2024, Nicholson accepted a Municipal Innovation Award on behalf of the City in recognition of its efforts to combat hunger through a collaborative, multi-service food hub.

On May 14, 2025, Mayor Nicholson marked the 175th anniversary of the day that Lynn became a City in a celebration on the Lynn Commons, at which Mayor Nicholson turned on the newly restored Commons Fountain for the first time in decades.

In 2026, Nicholson accepted an award for the City of Lynn’s designation as a Housing Hero by the Massachusetts Housing Partnership in honor of its multifaceted approach to tackling the housing shortage. That same year, the Harbor Park won Project of the Year from the Environmental Business Council of New England.

==== Other Offices ====
Nicholson was mentioned in various media outlets as a potential candidate for the Massachusetts Sixth Congressional District when Representative Seth Moulton declared he was running for U.S. Senate. Nicholson declined to run, citing his focus on his young family and the City of Lynn.

== Personal life ==
Nicholson lives in Lynn with his wife, Katherine, and their sons, Henry and Benjamin.
