= Christopher Street Project =

American nonprofit transgender rights organization

- Abbreviation: CSP
- Formation: January 13, 2025; 17 months ago
- Founder: Tyler Hack
- Type: Nonprofit Advocacy Organization and Political Action Committee
- Purpose: Transgender rights in the United States
- Region served: United States
- Executive Director: Tyler Hack
- Website: christopherstreetproject.org

The Christopher Street Project is a United States-based organization focused on advancing the rights of transgender individuals. The organization focuses on electing candidates who are proponents of transgender rights to the US Congress, unseating Democratic politicians who vote or speak out against trans rights, monitoring Democratic party lawmakers' commitments to the transgender community, and countering legislative actions that it perceives as harmful to transgender Americans.

== Mission ==
The project, named in reference to the 1969 Stonewall Riots and the location of the Stonewall Inn on Christopher Street, was founded in January 2025. The organization focuses on building and leveraging political power to advance equity for transgender individuals across the United States. It was founded as an electoral organization and a messaging resource, designed to influence Democratic policy positions and communications strategy related to transgender issues. The organization targets Democratic leaders who they believe have not consistently supported transgender rights, such as votes that have adversely affected healthcare access for military families with transgender children.

== Support ==
The Christopher Street Project has been publicly supported by members of the United States House of Representatives and the United States Senate, including U.S. Senator Andy Kim and Representatives Ayanna Pressley and Jasmine Crockett. Pressley said in a statement that she was "proud to help launch the Christopher Street Project and continue building a more just America where our transgender siblings are treated with respect, receive the healthcare they need, and can live their lives free from discrimination and violence."

== Fundraisers and events ==
On March 31, 2025, the Christopher Street Project led a collaboration with 12 organizations to host the primary Trans Day of Visibility (TDOV) rally and press conference on the National Mall. The rally featured over a dozen members of Congress, public figures such as last year’s Lena Dunham, and transgender activists such as Dr. Elijah Nicholas. More than 500 people attended the rally, and it was documented by 23 news outlets, including ABC, NBC, Washington Post, and Fox News.
