= Seth Moulton =

American politician (born 1978)

- Official portrait, 2015

Member of the U.S. House of Representatives from Massachusetts's 6th district
- Incumbent
- Assumed office January 3, 2015
- Preceded by: John F. Tierney

Personal details
- Born: Seth Wilbur Moulton; October 24, 1978 (age 48) Salem, Massachusetts, U.S.
- Party: Democratic
- Spouse: Liz Boardman (m. 2017)
- Children: 2
- Education: Harvard University (BS, MBA, MPA)
- Website: House website Campaign website

Military service
- Branch/service: United States Marine Corps
- Years of service: 2001–2008
- Rank: Captain
- Unit: 1st Battalion, 4th Marines
- Battles/wars: Iraq War
- Awards: Bronze Star Medal (2) with valor Navy and Marine Corps Commendation Medal with valor
- Moulton's voice Moulton at a hearing of the House Armed Services Subcommittee on Strategic Forces about the FY2024 nuclear forces budget request. Recorded March 28, 2023

Seth Wilbur Moulton (born October 24, 1978) is an American politician and Marine Corps combat veteran who has been the U.S. representative for Massachusetts's 6th congressional district since 2015. A member of the Democratic Party, his district includes many of Boston's northern suburbs, such as Andover, Marblehead, Peabody, and his hometown of Salem.

After graduating from Harvard College in 2001 with a bachelor of science in physics, Moulton joined the United States Marine Corps. He served four tours in Iraq and then earned his master's degrees in business and public administration in a dual program at Harvard. He entered politics in 2014, when he was elected to represent Massachusetts's 6th congressional district.

In November 2018, Moulton spearheaded an effort to oust Nancy Pelosi as House Democratic leader. Despite Moulton's efforts, Pelosi easily won the Democratic nomination for Speaker of the House on November 28, 2018, by a 203-to-32 vote of the Democratic caucus.

On April 22, 2019, Moulton announced he would pursue the Democratic nomination for president in the 2020 election. Moulton campaigned across Iowa, New Hampshire, and South Carolina during early 2019. Moulton's presidential campaign failed to garner support and he did not qualify for the primary debates. Moulton withdrew from the presidential race on August 23, 2019.

On October 15, 2025, Moulton announced a primary challenge to incumbent U.S. Senator Ed Markey in the Massachusetts Democratic primary for the 2026 U.S. Senate election in Massachusetts. On September 1, 2026, the incumbent Markey defeated Moulton in the Massachusetts Democratic primary by a 30-point margin. Dan Koh won the Democratic primary to replace Moulton in representing the 6th district, and defeated Republican candidate Micah Quinney Jones in the general election.

== Early life, education, and commission ==
Moulton was born on October 24, 1978, in Salem, Massachusetts, to Lynn Alice (née Meader), a secretary, and Wilbur Thomas Moulton, Jr., a real-estate attorney. He has two younger siblings, Eliza and Cyrus, and grew up in Marblehead, Massachusetts. He graduated from Phillips Academy in 1997, and attended Harvard College, where he earned a bachelor of science in physics in 2001. He gave the Undergraduate English Oration at his commencement, focusing on the importance of service.

Moulton joined the Marine Corps after graduation, a few months before the September 11 attacks. He attended the Officer Candidate School in Quantico, Virginia, and graduated in 2002 with the rank of second lieutenant. After he left the Marine Corps in 2008, Moulton attended a dual-degree program at the Harvard Business School and the Harvard Kennedy School, earning master's degrees in business and public policy in 2011. While a graduate student at Harvard, Moulton was a resident tutor in Quincy House.

== Military career ==
During the 2003 invasion of Iraq, Moulton led one of the first infantry platoons to enter Baghdad. He served a total of four tours of duty in Iraq from 2003 to 2008. Moulton took part in the 2003 Battle of Nasiriyah, leading a platoon that cleared a hostile stronghold. In that action, he went to the aid of a Marine wounded by friendly fire, and for his actions was awarded the Navy and Marine Corps Commendation Medal for valor. Moulton was active in combat against insurgent forces in Iraq, including the 2004 Battle of Najaf against the militia of Muqtada al-Sadr. Over two days, he "fearlessly exposed himself to enemy fire" as his platoon was pinned down under heavy fire and then directed the supporting fire that repelled the attack. He received the Bronze Star Medal for his actions in this battle.

In 2008, during Moulton's fourth tour of duty in Iraq, General David Petraeus requested that he be assigned to work as a special liaison with tribal leaders in southern Iraq. After that tour, Moulton was discharged from the Marine Corps with the rank of captain.

=== Media contributions ===
In 2003, Moulton co-hosted a television program with his Iraqi interpreter, Mohammed Harba, called Moulton and Mohammed, in which they discussed regional conditions in the period following the U.S. invasion before an audience of U.S. servicemen and Iraqi citizens. The show ended after three months when Moulton's unit left the area.

Between 2003 and 2008, Moulton was frequently interviewed about his experiences as an officer in Iraq by U.S. national media, including CNN, MSNBC, and NPR programs Morning Edition and All Things Considered.

Moulton was also prominently featured in the 2007 Academy Award-nominated documentary No End in Sight. In the film, he criticizes the U.S. government's handling of the occupation of Iraq. Director Charles H. Ferguson chose to include Moulton and two other Iraq veterans.

== Private sector career ==
After graduate school, he worked for one year as managing director of the Texas Central Railway, a transportation firm. In 2011, Moulton and a graduate-school classmate founded Eastern Healthcare Partners. The company raised investor funds and drafted a partnership agreement with Johns Hopkins School of Medicine, but in October 2014, the Boston Globe reported that by the time Moulton ran for Congress, EHP had no revenue, was still incubating, and had closed its only Massachusetts office.

== U.S. House of Representatives ==
=== Elections ===
==== 2012 speculation ====
Moulton considered running against Democratic Representative John F. Tierney of Massachusetts's 6th congressional district as an independent in 2012, but decided against it in July 2012, saying, "the time and the logistics of putting together all the campaign infrastructure, organizing the volunteers ... the fundraising—it's just too much to accomplish in three months." He told Roll Call that his own polling "showed there was in fact a clear path to victory" and said he might run for office in the future.

==== 2014 election ====
2014 Democratic primary results Moulton: 40–50%; 50–60%; 60–70%; 70–80%; Tierney: 40–50%; 50–60%

On July 8, 2013, Moulton announced his candidacy in the 2014 congressional race for Massachusetts's 6th district. The race had been recognized for its competitiveness by national and regional media throughout the election cycle. Moulton challenged Tierney in the Democratic primary.

Tierney's campaign claimed in campaign advertisements that Moulton received campaign contributions from a New Hampshire political action committee that previously donated only to Republicans, implying that Moulton must hold conservative views. Moulton denied being more conservative than Tierney, and said that the Republican PAC donation was returned. Public Federal Election Commission filings confirmed that the donation was returned in February 2014.

Moulton said that he opposed the Iraq War in which he served. A Tierney campaign staff member said that Moulton had "changed his mind" on the war, and highlighted Tierney's vote in Congress to oppose the 2002 resolution authorizing the U.S. Invasion of Iraq from the start. Moulton also received Retired General Stanley McChrystal's first-ever political endorsement during the campaign.

Moulton won the primary with 50.8% of the vote to Tierney's 40.1%.

For the general election, Moulton was endorsed by Senator Elizabeth Warren. In October 2014, he received criticism from his Republican opponent when he withdrew from a debate sponsored by radio station WGBH to instead attend a series of New York fundraisers hosted by Democratic National Committee chairwoman Debbie Wasserman Schultz.

The campaigns of Moulton and his Republican opponent, state Senator Richard Tisei, were held up as an example of a race where voters could respect both candidates and choose the better one, instead of having to choose the less undesirable one.

Moulton won the general election with 55.0% of the vote to Tisei's 41.1%.

==== 2016 election ====
Moulton was unopposed for reelection in 2016.

==== 2018 election ====
Moulton ran against Republican nominee Joseph Schneider in 2018. He won with 65.2% of the vote. In 2018 Moulton created the Serve America PAC, which helped elect Democratic candidates with national service experience.

==== 2020 election ====
Moulton faced his first primary challenge since taking office. He defeated Democratic challengers Angus McQuilken and Jamie Belsito with 78% of the vote, and defeated Republican nominee John Paul Moran with 65.4% of the vote.

==== 2022 election ====
Moulton faced Republican nominee Bob May in 2022. He won with 62.9% of the vote. Moulton refused to debate May, calling him an "election denier," citing the Republican candidate's refusal to recognize that President Joe Biden had won the 2020 presidential election.

==== 2024 election ====
Moulton ran for re-election in 2024. He was unopposed and won re-election.

=== Tenure ===
Moulton was sworn into the 114th United States Congress on January 3, 2015.

==== Challenge to Nancy Pelosi as House Democratic Leader ====
After the Democrats captured a majority in the House of Representatives in the 2018 midterm elections, Moulton spearheaded an effort to oust Nancy Pelosi as House Democratic leader and called for a "new generation of leadership". Moulton stated he was "100 percent confident" that Pelosi lacked the votes to remain as Democratic leader. He offered Representative Karen Bass as his first choice for Democratic leader, though Bass rejected such nomination and continued her support of Pelosi. On November 28, 2018, Pelosi easily won the Democratic nomination for Speaker of the House by a 203-to-32 vote of the Democratic caucus, with Moulton reversing himself and voting for Pelosi.

On August 24, 2021, Moulton, together with Republican representative Peter Meijer, flew unannounced into Hamid Karzai International Airport amid the evacuation of Americans and allies after the fall of Kabul. The two explained that their visit was kept secret to minimize disruption, and that its goal was "to provide guidance" to the Biden administration. Several government officials said that the surprise visit produced unhelpful distraction from the ongoing work of evacuating people. The next day, Pelosi sent a letter to all House members saying that "the Departments of Defense and State have requested that Members not travel to Afghanistan and the region during this time of danger" because such travel "would unnecessarily divert needed resources" from the evacuation efforts. Moulton defended his Kabul trip, saying, "At the end of the day, I don’t care what pundits in Washington are saying...They’ve been wrong about this war for 20 years."

=== Committee assignments ===
- Committee on Armed Services
  - Subcommittee on Strategic Forces
  - Subcommittee on Cyber, Information Technologies, and Innovation
- Committee on Transportation and Infrastructure
  - Subcommittee on Highways and Transit
  - Subcommittee on Railroads, Pipelines, and Hazardous Materials
  - Subcommittee on Water Resources and Environment
- Committee on Strategic Competition between the United States and the Chinese Communist Party

=== Caucus memberships ===
- Congressional Arts Caucus
- Congressional Taiwan Caucus
- Black Maternal Health Caucus
- Congressional Equality Caucus
- Congressional Ukraine Caucus
- New Democrat Coalition
- Blue Collar Caucus
- For Country Caucus
- Rare Disease Caucus

== Serve America PAC ==
In 2017, Moulton founded Serve America, a political action committee that aims to help elect candidates with national service experience, focusing primarily, but not exclusively, on military service. The organization offers a network for candidates to build a community and receive advice from each other and Moulton. This was beneficial for candidates like Abigail Spanberger who said, "[Moulton has] created a network of people who are able to lean on each other, share experiences, and discuss what the campaigns are like."

In 2018, Serve America worked towards flipping the U.S. House of Representatives majority from Republican to Democrat. In the 2018 election cycle, the PAC raised over $7.5 million for the candidates it endorsed. It raised the third largest amount of money among Democrats (after House majority leader Steny Hoyer and Senator Kamala Harris), according to campaign-finance non-profit Issue One. During the midterm cycle, Serve America publicly supported 34 congressional Democratic candidates, out of which 18 were elected. Out of those 18, 15 had flipped from Republican to Democratic, representing more than half of the 28 seats Democrats gained.

First-time candidates endorsed by Serve America who won their elections in the 2020 cycle included Mark Kelly from Arizona and Jake Auchincloss from Massachusetts' 4th District. They also re-endorsed 21 successful incumbent candidates. In the 2022 cycle, Serve America endorsed six first-time candidates who won their election.

== 2020 U.S. presidential campaign ==
Moulton's 2020 presidential campaign logo

Early in 2019, Moulton began to recruit staff for a potential campaign for the 2020 Democratic presidential nomination. He traveled to early primary states such as Iowa and New Hampshire in March 2019. Moulton sought to become just the second sitting U.S. representative to be elected president.

Moulton officially announced his candidacy for the U.S. presidency on April 22, 2019. During the primary campaign, Moulton criticized the Democratic frontrunner, former Vice President Joe Biden, over his vote in favor of authorizing the Iraq War in 2002. Moulton criticized progressive candidate Senator Bernie Sanders, stating "Bernie wants to change us into a socialist country, and we're not a socialist country." Moulton challenged Senator Elizabeth Warren's proposal to break up the largest U.S. tech companies, arguing "She’s completely ignored what’s going on in China. If we just break up all the American tech companies, China’s going to eat our lunch." A Suffolk University/Boston Globe poll for the New Hampshire primary conducted from August 1–4 surveyed 500 voters and did not find a single Moulton supporter.

On August 7, 2019, Moulton laid off approximately half of his 30 person campaign staff amid low polling and fundraising. The Moulton presidential campaign raised just $1 million during the 2019 calendar year. On August 23, 2019, Moulton withdrew from the race. During his campaign, Moulton never polled above 2% in any Democratic presidential opinion poll, and was not invited to the first two Democratic presidential debates, having failed to meet the criteria for invitation.

After Moulton dropped out of the race, then-President Donald Trump sarcastically tweeted in response: "The Dow is down 573 points on the news that Representative Seth Moulton, whoever that may be, has dropped out of the 2020 Presidential Race!"

The Moulton campaign expressed hope that Moulton would be considered for a key administration post if a Democrat won the White House in 2020, such as secretary of veterans affairs, defense secretary or United Nations ambassador. However, President-elect Joe Biden did not offer Moulton any executive nomination or role in his presidential cabinet in 2021.

== 2026 U.S. Senate campaign ==
On October 15, 2025, Moulton announced his candidacy in the 2026 U.S. Senate election in Massachusetts, challenging incumbent Senator Ed Markey in the Democratic primary. Moulton cited Markey's age (79) as a factor in his decision to challenge him. On October 16, 2025, Moulton announced his campaign would return recent donations from AIPAC, citing the organization's support of the current Israeli government. Jewish Insider reported that he wanted AIPAC's endorsement for the 2026 Senate race and spurned it after failing to secure the endorsement. However, Moulton dismissed the claim.

Moulton was criticized by Markey for his moderate policy positions on issues such as transgender rights, including saying that he would not want his daughters to play sports against transgender athletes. Moulton lost the Democratic primary to Markey on September 1, winning 35.2% of the vote to Markey's 64.8%.

== Political positions ==
Moulton has been called a moderate Democrat who has urged compromise and bipartisanship as well as open debate on controversial topics to push back against what he says is the "extremist" agenda of the Trump administration. Moulton is a member of the New Democrat Coalition, a congressional caucus of Democrats who call themselves "moderate", "pro-growth", and "fiscally responsible", and whom others call "centrist." Moulton has previously commented that a "fear of backlash" stops many Democratic lawmakers from changing their positions on cultural issues and criticized what he described as "Democratic purity tests."

Moulton was ranked the 34th most bipartisan member of the U.S. House of Representatives during the 114th United States Congress by the Lugar Center and the McCourt School of Public Policy's Bipartisan Index, which ranks members by their degree of bipartisanship (by measuring how often each member's bills attract co-sponsors from the opposite party and how often each member co-sponsors bills by members of the opposite party).

=== Economics ===
According to The Boston Globe, "one of Moulton’s biggest focuses is addressing the long-term impact of automation on the economy, which he says will disproportionately affect working-class communities."

In September 2018, Moulton, Elise Stefanik, and Dan Donovan co-sponsored the "Cyber Ready Workforce Act", advanced by Jacky Rosen. The legislation would create a grant program within the Department of Labor to "create, implement and expand registered apprenticeships" in cybersecurity. It aims to offer certifications and connect participants with businesses to "boost the number" of workers for federal cybersecurity jobs.

In January 2019, Moulton sponsored a bill to increase the minimum wage to $15 an hour over five years.

In 2019, Moulton criticized Trump's withdrawal from the Trans-Pacific Partnership and said that, if elected president, he would reengage in negotiations for "a strong, fair trade deal for the Pacific on our terms, not China's". He also criticized Trump's use of tariffs, telling The Hill that although tariffs remain an option for trade policy the emphasis should be "a comprehensive strategy" and building "our alliances in the Pacific".

In November 2025, following the election of Zohran Mamdani as mayor of New York City, Moulton voted with 85 other House Democrats on a Republican-led resolution "denouncing the horrors of socialism".

=== Energy and environmental policy ===
Moulton supports the expansion of renewable energy and the diversification of the energy grid. He is supportive of carbon pricing and banning fossil fuel extraction on federal lands. Moulton voted in favor of the Inflation Reduction Act in 2022, which included historic funding into renewable energy innovation and implementation. Moulton is also a supporter of nuclear energy. In a 2019 interview, he called nuclear energy "a safe, good investment...for the future of our country." He has also expressed support for the expansion of research and development for fusion power.

=== Gun control ===
On June 15, 2016, Moulton appeared on the cover of the New York Daily News with the headline "No Civilian Should Own This Gun", in reference to semi-automatic assault weapons. Moulton penned an opinion piece promoting gun control, including the statement: "There's simply no reason for a civilian to own a military-style assault weapon. It's no different than why we outlaw civilian ownership of rockets and landmines."

=== Military and foreign policy ===
Moulton opposed sending U.S. troops back to Iraq in 2014. He also supported strengthening NATO against Russia and keeping troops in Afghanistan temporarily to execute a counterterrorist mission in 2019.

In a November 2022 Hudson Institute event, Moulton stated "Every new weapons system should have sort of an AI component or capability or the ability to integrate that, because the reality is that this is the future of warfare."

Moulton criticized President Joe Biden for the withdrawal of U.S. troops from Afghanistan, citing the chaotic evacuation of Afghans who had supported the U.S. in the effort to fight terrorism. In June 2025, Moulton co-signed a letter led by Rep. Josh Gottheimer, asking Trump to comply with the TikTok divest-or-ban law and not grant further extensions to the deadline.

The same month, Moulton broke from other Democrats in supporting the U.S. strikes on Iran in the Twelve-Day War.

In October 2025, Moulton announced he would be returning donations from AIPAC, a pro-Israel lobbying group, citing the group's support for Israeli prime minister Benjamin Netanyahu. However Jewish Insider subsequently reported that, prior to denouncing AIPAC, Moulton had "spent months seeking a promise that the group would endorse him upon the announcement of his Senate campaign," and "made multiple explicit requests for an endorsement throughout the summer", but AIPAC leaders ultimately were not willing to provide such a guarantee. His campaign did not deny Jewish Insider's reporting, but Moulton stated that the lack of an endorsement was not a factor in his decision.

=== Presidents ===
==== Donald Trump ====
In a March 2016 interview, Moulton compared the rise of Republican presidential front-runner Donald Trump to Adolf Hitler's rise to power in the 1930s. Moulton said that, to understand how an educated society "can elect a demagogue", voters should read about how the German people elected Hitler in the early 20th century.

Moulton walked out of Trump's 2020 State of the Union address, citing the part of the address about the administration's contributions to the military and service members. Moulton said: "Trump—a draft dodger who has mocked Senator John McCain, Gold Star families, and soldiers with traumatic brain injury—started talking about the good he has done for our military."

==== Joe Biden ====
During the 2020 presidential campaign, Moulton endorsed Joe Biden and campaigned for him in Iowa and New Hampshire after ending his own bid for the Democratic nomination. On July 4, 2024, Moulton was the third U.S. representative to call for Biden to withdraw from the 2024 United States presidential election. On July 19, 2024, Moulton published an Op-Ed in the Boston Globe elaborating on President Joe Biden's mental decline and the need for a new Democratic Party nominee in 2024. Moulton explained, "Recently, I saw [President Biden] in a small group at Normandy for the 80th anniversary of D-Day. For the first time, he didn’t seem to recognize me. Of course, that can happen as anyone ages, but as I watched [Biden's] disastrous debate a few weeks ago, I have to admit that what I saw in Normandy was part of a deeper problem."

=== Social issues ===
Moulton supports abortion rights and same-sex marriage. He supports legal immigration and advocates for immigration reform, but opposes illegal immigration and has called it "something we have to confront".

In August 2023, Moulton was one of nine House Democrats who voted in favor of a Republican-led amendment to the National Defense Authorization Act (NDAA) prohibiting the teaching of "race-based theories" in schools operated by the Department of Defense Education Activity, introduced by Rep. Chip Roy. It was opposed by most Democrats as part of a broader Republican effort to target so-called "Critical Race Theory".

==== Animal welfare ====
Moulton endorsed a 2016 Massachusetts ballot measure, Question 3, designed to protect the welfare of farmed animals. The measure prohibited Massachusetts farmers from "knowingly cause any covered animal to be confined in a cruel manner" and prohibited the sale of eggs or meat from animals that did not meet the standards.

In 2022, Moulton was among a bipartisan group of 19 members of Congress who called on the National Institutes of Health (NIH) and the Department of Health and Human Services (HHS) to enact federal protections for cephalopods (such as octopuses, squid, and cuttlefish) used in laboratory research and to update federal animal welfare policies to include these species, and he helped lead congressional letters to NIH and HHS reiterating these requests.

==== Cannabis ====
Moulton has acknowledged having used cannabis and supports its legalization, saying, "If you're not buying your marijuana from a dealer who sells heroin, who sells opioids, it's much less likely to be a gateway drug. The problem is now that it operates in the shadows. There's no control whatsoever. Someone goes and buys an edible, for example, there's no regulation about what's in that. It's like moonshine under Prohibition."

==== Mental health ====
In 2022, Moulton wrote the legislation which shortened the phone number for the National Suicide and Mental Health Crisis Hotline to 988. He also introduced the Brandon Act, a law intended to improve mental health access for active duty armed service members.

==== Transgender issues ====
In 2022 and 2023, Moulton cosponsored the Transgender Bill of Rights and voted in favor of the Equality Act.

Following Kamala Harris's loss to Donald Trump in the 2024 presidential election, Moulton expressed opposition to transgender participation in girls' sports. Moulton commented: "'I have two little girls, I don't want them getting run over on a playing field by a male or formerly male athlete, but as a Democrat I'm supposed to be afraid to say that'". Following his remarks, his campaign manager, Matt Chilliak, resigned in protest, and his comments were condemned by Salem mayor Dominick Pangallo, Massachusetts state Rep. Manny Cruz, the vice-chair of the Salem School Committee, and Governor Maura Healey. He also faced protest from constituents. Moulton released a response on November 8, 2024 defending his statement.

Moulton said in a follow-up interview that it was "kind of weird" to include pronouns after signatures in emails. He later asserted that Trump's policies would be "extremely harmful" to transgender children and that transgender children "deserve our support", but still described Democrats as "out of touch" on transgender issues. On November 13, 2024 the Salem Democratic City Committee vowed to find someone to run against Moulton in the Democratic primaries for the 2026 midterm elections due to his comments, with the chair of the local Democratic committee in Salem referring to him in an email as a "cooperator" in "Nazi times." On November 17, hundreds of people in Salem gathered at his office in the town at a rally held in protest at his remarks, co-organized by city councillor Kyle Davis.

On November 25, 2024 Moulton said in an interview with the Rolling Stone that the media, in particular The New York Times, had misrepresented his position on transgender issues following the election. Moulton clarified that he still supports transgender rights, but simply wanted Democrats to be more open to talking about the issue. Moulton additionally said that he was not proposing that Democrats should ban transgender women from women's sports, but instead just "wanted [Democrats] to have a message to fight back against attacks". He also described Nancy Mace's attacks on transgender rights following the election as "abhorrent".

In January 2025 Moulton voted against the "Protection of Women and Girls in Sports Act" which would have banned trans women and girls from competing in women's sports nationwide, commenting that the bill was "too extreme". Moulton condemned Donald Trump's Executive Order 14168, but said the Democratic Party should "stop denying that this is an issue" and "have a response". In September 2025, Moulton co-sponsored the 988 LGBTQ+ Youth Access Act of 2025, a House bill seeking to restore funding to the 988 Suicide and Crisis Lifeline, specifically for LGBTQ+ services.

In November 2025, after announcing his bid for the US Senate, Moulton said he supported trans rights and vowed to "support and lead legislation like the Transgender Bill of Rights" if he is elected to the Senate. Moulton also said that there "is no room in the Democratic Party for complete opposition to trans rights" and he vowed to "fight to pass full federal LGBTQ+ anti-discrimination policies" and support the Equality Act. Moulton mentioned that he had listened to feedback from people who "were hurt by how [he] framed [his] comments in the past about the best way to protect the trans community". Moulton reiterated that his "intent has always been to push our party to have honest, tough conversations so we can fight back more effectively against the far-right attacks on LGBTQ Americans. I remain committed to protecting the rights and dignity of transgender Americans".

In August 2026, when his Democratic primary opponent Ed Markey, attacked Moulton for abandoning trans children with his earlier remarks, Moulton accused Markey of being "just like the Republicans" for "injecting a divisive social issue into the primary campaign". Moulton also said that despite his previous apology, he was "not sorry for the substance of his earlier remarks".

== Personal life ==
On June 23, 2017, Moulton announced his engagement to his girlfriend Liz Boardman, a senior client partner at an executive search firm. They were married at the Old North Church in Marblehead, Massachusetts, on September 22, 2017. She changed her surname to his, becoming Liz Moulton. Their first child was born in October 2018. In 2019, Moulton announced that he was suffering from post-traumatic stress disorder (PTSD) following his service in the Marine Corps. On August 29, 2020, Moulton announced that the family was expecting a second child, who was born in February 2021.

== Electoral history ==
Massachusetts's 6th congressional district Democratic primary, 2014
Party	Candidate	Votes	%
Democratic	Seth Moulton	36,575	50.8
Democratic	John F. Tierney (incumbent)	28,915	40.1
Democratic	Marisa Defranco	4,293	6.0
Democratic	John Devine	1,527	2.1
Democratic	John Gutta	691	1.0
Total votes		72,001	100.0

Massachusetts's 6th congressional district general election, 2014
Party	Candidate	Votes	%
Democratic	Seth Moulton	149,638	55.0
Republican	Richard Tisei	111,989	41.1
Unenrolled	Christopher Stockwell	10,373	3.8
Total votes		272,000	100.0

Massachusetts's 6th congressional district general election, 2016
Party	Candidate	Votes	%
Democratic	Seth Moulton (incumbent)	308,923	98.4
Write-in		5,132	1.6
Total votes		314,055	100.0

Massachusetts's 6th congressional district general election, 2018
Party	Candidate	Votes	%
Democratic	Seth Moulton (incumbent)	217,703	65.2
Republican	Joseph Schneider	104,798	31.4
Unenrolled	Mary Jean Charbonneau	11,309	3.4
Total votes		333,810	100.0

Massachusetts's 6th congressional district Democratic primary, 2020
Party	Candidate	Votes	%
Democratic	Seth Moulton (incumbent)	124,928	78.0
Democratic	Jamie Belsito	19,492	12.2
Democratic	Angus McQuilken	15,478	9.7
Total votes		159,898	100.0

Massachusetts's 6th congressional district general election, 2020
Party	Candidate	Votes	%
Democratic	Seth Moulton (incumbent)	286,377	65.4
Republican	John Paul Moran	150,695	34.4
Total votes		437,072	100.0

Massachusetts's 6th congressional district general election, 2022
Party	Candidate	Votes	%
Democratic	Seth Moulton (incumbent)	198,119	62.9
Republican	Bob May	110,770	35.2
Unenrolled	Mark Tashjian	5,995	1.9
Total votes		314,884	100.0

Massachusetts's 6th congressional district general election, 2024
Party	Candidate	Votes	%
Democratic	Seth Moulton (incumbent)	321,186	97.8
Write-in		7,191	2.2
Total votes		328,377	100.0

2026 United States Senate election in Massachusetts - Democratic Primary
Party	Candidate	Votes	%
Democratic	Ed Markey (incumbent)	574,030	64.8
Democratic	Seth Moulton	311,151	35.2
Total votes		885,181	100.0

U.S. House of Representatives
Preceded by John F. Tierney	Member of the U.S. House of Representatives from Massachusetts's 6th congressional district 2015–present	Incumbent
U.S. order of precedence (ceremonial)
Preceded by John Moolenaar	United States representatives by seniority 140th	Succeeded by Dan Newhouse
