= 2014 United States Senate election in Massachusetts =

- November 4, 2014
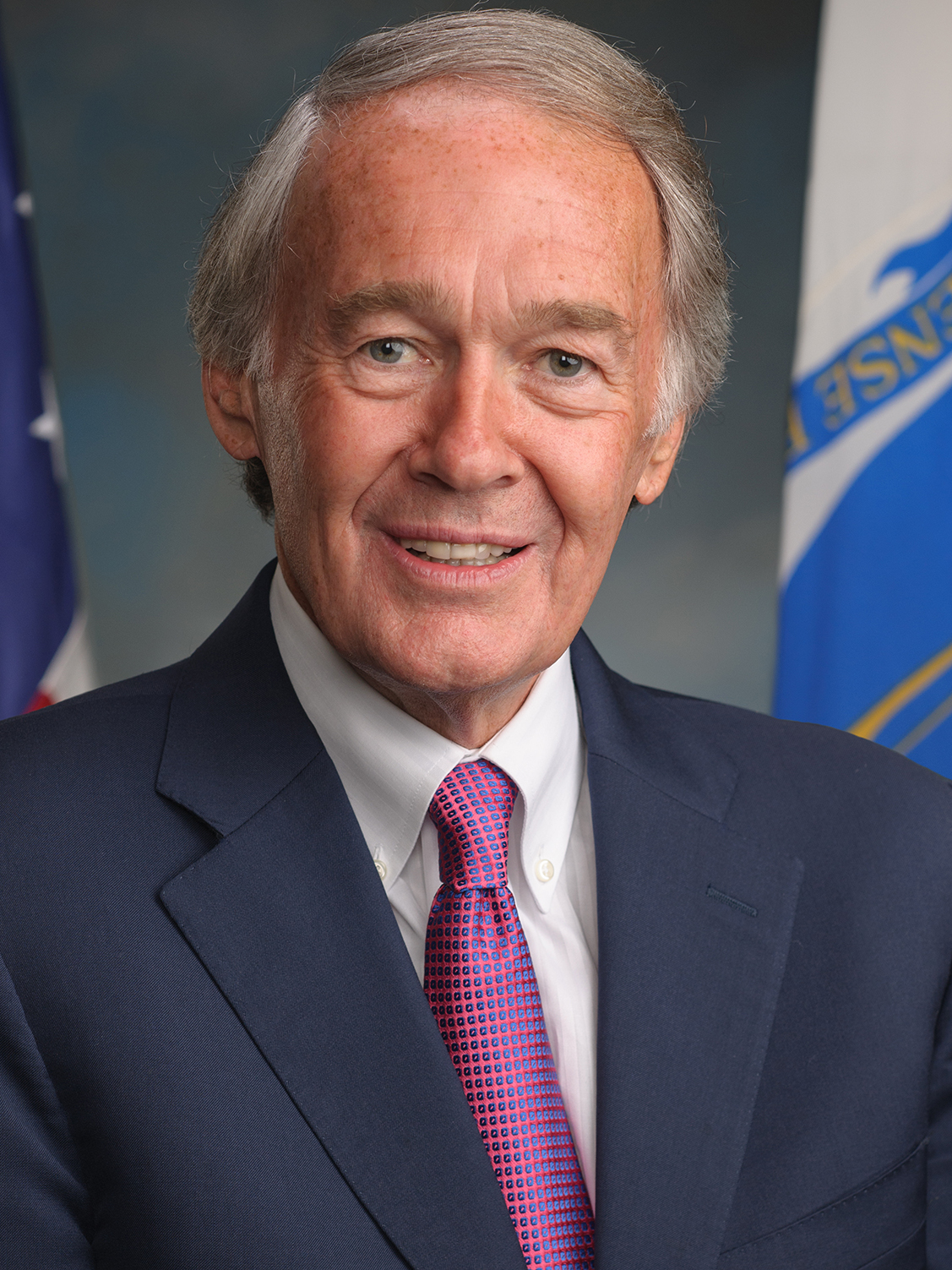

Nominee	Ed Markey	Brian Herr
Party	Democratic	Republican
Popular vote	1,289,944	791,950
Percentage	61.87%	37.98%
- Markey: 40–50% 50–60% 60–70% 70–80% 80–90% >90% Herr: 40–50% 50–60% 60–70% Tie: 40–50%
U.S. senator before election
Ed Markey
Democratic
Elected U.S. Senator
Ed Markey
Democratic

The 2014 United States Senate election in Massachusetts was held on November 4, 2014, to elect a member of the United States Senate to represent the Commonwealth of Massachusetts, concurrently with the election of the Governor of Massachusetts, other elections to the United States Senate in other states and elections to the United States House of Representatives and various state and local elections.

Incumbent Democratic Senator Ed Markey ran for re-election to a first full term in office. Primary elections were held on September 9, 2014. Markey was unopposed for the Democratic nomination; Hopkinton Selectman Brian Herr was also unopposed for the Republican nomination.

== Background ==
Incumbent Democratic Senator John Kerry, serving since 1985, had planned to run for re-election to a sixth term, but on December 15, 2012, it was announced that the long-time Massachusetts senator and 2004 presidential nominee would be nominated as United States Secretary of State under President Barack Obama. Massachusetts Governor Deval Patrick appointed Mo Cowan as a temporary replacement for Kerry, after he was confirmed as secretary of state and therefore resigned his senate seat. There was a special election on June 25, 2013, to finish the term, which was won by Ed Markey, the 37-year Democratic incumbent from Massachusetts's 5th congressional district.

== Democratic primary ==
=== Candidates ===
==== Declared ====
- Ed Markey, incumbent U.S. Senator

==== Withdrew ====
- John Kerry, U.S. Secretary of State and former U.S. Senator

==== Declined ====
- Mo Cowan, former U.S. Senator

== Republican primary ==
=== Candidates ===
==== Declared ====
- Brian Herr, Hopkinton Selectman

==== Did not qualify ====
- Frank Addivinola, attorney, candidate for Massachusetts's 5th congressional district in 2012 and 2013
- J. Mark Inman, contestant on The X Factor in 2011

==== Declined ====
- Keith Ablow, psychiatrist and Fox News contributor
- Charlie Baker, former state cabinet secretary and nominee for governor in 2010 (ran for governor)
- Scott Brown, former U.S. Senator (ran for the U.S. Senate in New Hampshire)
- Gabriel E. Gomez, businessman, former Navy SEAL and nominee for the U.S. Senate in 2013
- Richard Tisei, former State Senate Minority Leader, nominee for lieutenant governor in 2010 and nominee for MA-06 in 2012 (ran for Congress)
- William Weld, former governor of Massachusetts and nominee for the U.S. Senate in 1996
- Daniel Winslow, former state representative and candidate for the U.S. Senate in 2013

== Independent ==
=== Candidates ===
==== Withdrew ====
- Bruce Skarin, government research scientist

== General election ==
=== Predictions ===
Source	Ranking	As of
The Cook Political Report	Solid D	November 3, 2014
Sabato's Crystal Ball	Safe D	November 3, 2014
Rothenberg Political Report	Safe D	November 3, 2014
Real Clear Politics	Safe D	November 3, 2014

=== Polling ===
Poll source	Date(s) administered	Sample size	Margin of error	Ed Markey (D)	Brian Herr (R)	Other	Undecided
CBS News/NYT/YouGov	July 5–24, 2014	1,846	± 4.9%	61%	34%	2%	3%
Boston Globe	September 14–16, 2014	407	± 4.85%	53%	27%	—	21%
Rasmussen Reports	September 16–17, 2014	750	± 4%	49%	31%	5%	15%
WBUR/MassINC	September 16–21, 2014	502	± 4.4%	58%	30%	1%	11%
WNEU	September 20–28, 2014	416 LV	± 5%	56%	34%	—	10%
WNEU	September 20–28, 2014	536 RV	± 4%	52%	34%	—	14%
Suffolk University	September 25–28, 2014	500	± 4.4%	54%	30%	—	16%
CBS News/NYT/YouGov	September 20 – October 1, 2014	2,389	± 2%	54%	31%	1%	14%
WBUR/MassINC	October 1–4, 2014	504	± 4.4%	56%	30%	1%	13%
CBS News/NYT/YouGov	October 16–23, 2014	2,218	± 3%	54%	32%	0%	14%
WBUR/MassINC	October 22–25, 2014	494	± 4.4%	57%	32%	1%	9%
Umass Amherst	October 20–27, 2014	591 LV	± 4.4%	53%	37%	—	9%
Umass Amherst	October 20–27, 2014	800 RV	± 3.8%	52%	32%	—	15%
Suffolk University	October 27–29, 2014	500	± 4.4%	49%	34%	—	17%
WNEU	October 21–30, 2014	430 LV	± 5%	54%	34%	—	12%
WNEU	October 21–30, 2014	522 RV	± 4%	53%	31%	—	17%
Public Policy Polling	October 30 – November 2, 2014	887	± 3.3%	52%	38%	—	10%

Hypothetical polling

With Markey

Poll source	Date(s) administered	Sample size	Margin of error	Ed Markey (D)	Frank Addivinola (R)	Other	Undecided
CBS News/NYT/YouGov	July 5–24, 2014	1,901	± 4.9%	59%	34%	2%	5%
CBS News/NYT/YouGov	August 18 – September 2, 2014	3,361	± 2%	53%	28%	2%	17%

Poll source	Date(s) administered	Sample size	Margin of error	Ed Markey (D)	Scott Brown (R)	Other	Undecided
MassInc	July 17–20, 2013	500	± 4.4%	43%	38%	2%	17%
Public Policy Polling	September 20–23, 2013	616	± 4%	46%	45%	—	9%

Poll source	Date(s) administered	Sample size	Margin of error	Ed Markey (D)	Gabriel Gomez (R)	Other	Undecided
Public Policy Polling	September 20–23, 2013	616	± 4%	53%	35%	—	12%

Poll source	Date(s) administered	Sample size	Margin of error	Ed Markey (D)	Richard Tisei (R)	Other	Undecided
Public Policy Polling	September 20–23, 2013	616	± 4%	54%	27%	—	19%

Poll source	Date(s) administered	Sample size	Margin of error	Ed Markey (D)	Bill Weld (R)	Other	Undecided
Public Policy Polling	September 20–23, 2013	616	± 4%	47%	41%	—	11%

Poll source	Date(s) administered	Sample size	Margin of error	Ed Markey (D)	Generic Republican	Other	Undecided
WBUR/MassINC	March 14–16, 2014	500	± 4.4%	50%	29%	—	21%

With Kerry

Poll source	Date(s) administered	Sample size	Margin of error	John Kerry (D)	Generic Republican	Other	Undecided
Public Policy Polling	September 13–16, 2012	1,051	± 3.3%	54%	33%	—	13%
Public Policy Polling	October 9–11, 2012	1,051	± 3.0%	53%	32%	—	15%
Public Policy Polling	November 1–2, 2012	1,089	± 3.0%	54%	30%	—	15%

=== Results ===
United States Senate election in Massachusetts, 2014
Party	Candidate	Votes	%	±%
Democratic	Ed Markey (incumbent)	1,289,944	61.87%	+7.07%
Republican	Brian Herr	791,950	37.98%	−6.62%
Write-in		3,078	0.15%	-0.06%
Total votes		2,084,972	100.00%	N/A
Democratic hold				

==== By county ====
By county

County	Ed Markey Democratic		Brian Herr Republican		Write-in	
County	#	%	#	%	#	%
Barnstable	51,317	53.5	44,534	46.4	60	0.1
Berkshire	28,871	74.9	9,626	25.0	26	0.1
Bristol	84,226	59.4	57,513	40.5	150	0.1
Dukes	5,161	71.9	2,010	28.0	4	0.1
Essex	146,869	59.4	99,944	40.4	303	0.1
Franklin	18,785	73.1	6,899	26.8	28	0.1
Hampden	76,816	59.7	51,664	40.1	296	0.2
Hampshire	38,451	71.8	15,036	28.1	65	0.1
Middlesex	337,553	65.9	173,537	33.9	794	0.2
Nantucket	2,233	61.7	1,386	38.3	3	0.1
Norfolk	144,086	59.4	98,027	40.4	331	0.1
Plymouth	91,682	52.8	81,740	47.1	149	0.1
Suffolk	134,704	79.5	34,189	20.2	542	0.3
Worcester	129,190	52.7	115,845	47.2	327	0.1
Totals	1,289,944	61.87	791,950	37.98	3,078	0.15

Counties that flipped from Republican to Democratic

- Barnstable (largest municipality: Barnstable)
- Bristol (largest municipality: New Bedford)
- Hampden (largest municipality: Springfield)
- Plymouth (largest municipality: Brockton)
- Worcester (largest municipality: Worcester)

==== By congressional district ====
Markey won all nine congressional districts.

District	Markey	Herr	Representative
1st	62%	38%	Richard Neal
2nd	58%	42%	Jim McGovern
3rd	58%	42%	Niki Tsongas
4th	59%	41%	Joe Kennedy III
5th	69%	31%	Katherine Clark
6th	58%	42%	John F. Tierney
7th	84%	16%	Michael Capuano
8th	61%	39%	Stephen Lynch
9th	55%	45%	Bill Keating

== See also ==
- 2013 United States Senate special election in Massachusetts
- 2014 United States Senate elections
- 2014 Massachusetts gubernatorial election
- 2014 United States elections
