= Representative Tsongas =

Representative Tsongas may refer to:

- Niki Tsongas, former U.S. Representative from MA-05, then MA-03
- Paul Tsongas, former U.S. Representative from MA-05
