= 2012 United States House of Representatives elections in Massachusetts =

- November 6, 2012

All 9 Massachusetts seats in the United States House of Representatives
	Majority party	Minority party
Party	Democratic	Republican
Last election	10	0
Seats won	9	0
Seat change	▼1	Steady
Popular vote	1,544,103	693,624
Percentage	66.04%	29.67%
Swing	▲8.56%	▼9.18%
- Democratic 40–50% 50–60% 60–70% 70–80% 80–90% 90>%

The 2012 United States House of Representatives elections in Massachusetts were held on Tuesday, November 6, 2012, to elect the nine U.S. representatives from the state of Massachusetts, a loss of one seat following the 2010 census, for service in the 113th Congress from January 3, 2013, to January 3, 2015. The elections coincided with the elections of other federal and state offices, including a quadrennial presidential election. The candidate elected in each of the state's congressional districts was a member the Democratic Party.

Primary elections were held on September 6, 2012. This primary was on a Thursday, which is rare in Massachusetts, and it was moved from Tuesday, September 18, 2012, because of a conflicting religious holiday.

== Overview ==
United States House of Representatives elections in Massachusetts, 2012
Party	Votes	Percentage	Seats	+/–
Democratic	1,544,103	66.04%	9	-1
Republican	693,624	29.67%	0	—
Libertarian	16,668	0.71%	0	—
Independents	83,580	3.57%	0	—
Totals	2,337,975	100.00%	9	-1

== District 1 ==
2012 Massachusetts's 1st congressional district election
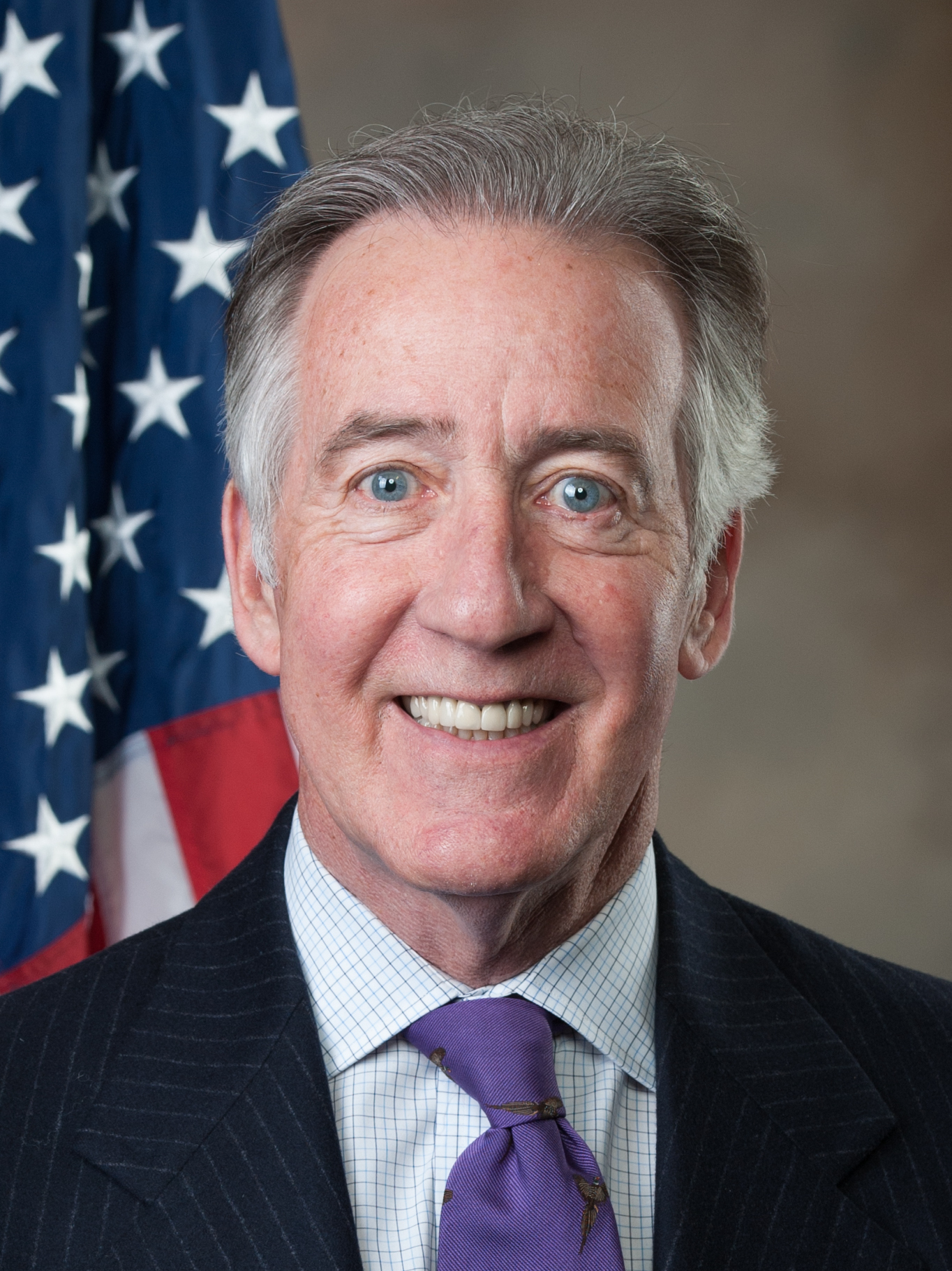
Nominee	Richard Neal
Party	Democratic
Popular vote	261,936
Percentage	98.4%
U.S. Representative before election
Richard Neal
Democratic
Elected U.S. Representative
Richard Neal
Democratic

Democrat Richard Neal, who has represented the 2nd district since 1989, was redistricted into the 1st district. He ran for re-election.

=== Democratic primary ===
==== Candidates ====
===== Nominee =====
- Richard Neal, incumbent U.S. Representative

===== Eliminated in primary =====
- Andrea F. Nuciforo Jr., Middle Berkshire Register of Deeds and former state senator
- Bill Shein, writer

==== Primary results ====
Democratic primary results
Party	Candidate	Votes	%
Democratic	Richard Neal (incumbent)	40,295	65.5
Democratic	Andrea F. Nuciforo, Jr.	15,159	24.6
Democratic	Bill Shein	6,059	9.8
Democratic	Write-ins	33	0.1
Total votes		61,546	100.0

=== General election ===
==== Predictions ====
Source	Ranking	As of
The Cook Political Report	Safe D	November 5, 2012
Rothenberg	Safe D	November 2, 2012
Roll Call	Safe D	November 4, 2012
Sabato's Crystal Ball	Safe D	November 5, 2012
NY Times	Safe D	November 4, 2012
RCP	Safe D	November 4, 2012
The Hill	Safe D	November 4, 2012

==== Results ====
Massachusetts's 1st congressional district, 2012
Party	Candidate	Votes	%
Democratic	Richard Neal (incumbent)	261,936	98.4
n/a	Write-ins	4,197	1.6
Total votes		266,133	100.0
Democratic hold			

== District 2 ==
2012 Massachusetts's 2nd congressional district election
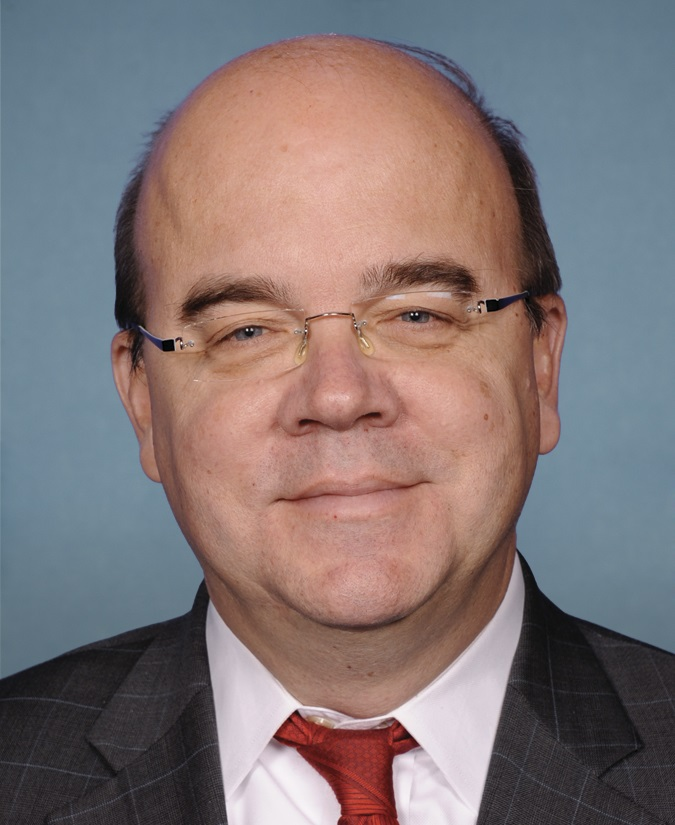
Nominee	Jim McGovern
Party	Democratic
Popular vote	259,257
Percentage	98.5%
U.S. Representative before election
Jim McGovern
Democratic
Elected U.S. Representative
Jim McGovern
Democratic

Since 1991, Democrat John Olver, has represented the 1st district, most of which remains in the proposed new 1st district. He was to have been redistricted to the 2nd district, except that he announced his retirement two weeks before the new districts were proposed.

Democrat Jim McGovern, who was redistricted from the 3rd district, ran for re-election.

=== Democratic primary ===
==== Candidates ====
===== Nominee =====
- Jim McGovern, incumbent U.S. Representative

===== Eliminated in primary =====
- William Feegbeh

===== Declined =====
- John Olver, incumbent U.S. Representative
- Dennis Rosa, state representative

==== Primary results ====
Democratic primary results
Party	Candidate	Votes	%
Democratic	James McGovern (incumbent)	24,375	91.3
Democratic	William Feegbeh	2,265	8.5
Democratic	Write-ins	44	0.2
Total votes		26,684	100.0

=== Republican primary ===
==== Declined ====
- Gregg Lisciotti, real estate developer
- Dean Mazzarella, Mayor of Leominster

=== General election ===
==== Predictions ====
Source	Ranking	As of
The Cook Political Report	Safe D	November 5, 2012
Rothenberg	Safe D	November 2, 2012
Roll Call	Safe D	November 4, 2012
Sabato's Crystal Ball	Safe D	November 5, 2012
NY Times	Safe D	November 4, 2012
RCP	Safe D	November 4, 2012
The Hill	Safe D	November 4, 2012

==== Results ====
Massachusetts's 2nd congressional district, 2012
Party	Candidate	Votes	%
Democratic	Jim McGovern (incumbent)	259,257	98.5
n/a	Write-ins	4,078	1.5
Total votes		263,335	100.0
Democratic hold			

== District 3 ==
2012 Massachusetts's 3rd congressional district election
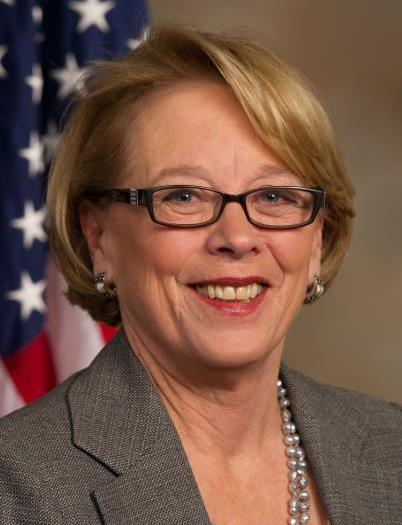

Nominee	Niki Tsongas	Jon Golnik
Party	Democratic	Republican
Popular vote	212,119	109,372
Percentage	65.9%	34.0%
- County results Tsongas: 60–70%
U.S. Representative before election
Niki Tsongas
Democratic
Elected U.S. Representative
Niki Tsongas
Democratic

Democrat Niki Tsongas, who was redistricted from the 5th district, ran for re-election. She was unopposed in the primary.

=== Democratic primary ===
==== Candidates ====
===== Nominee =====
- Niki Tsongas, incumbent U.S. Representative

==== Primary results ====
Democratic primary results
Party	Candidate	Votes	%
Democratic	Nicola Tsongas (incumbent)	24,105	99.2
Democratic	Write-ins	196	0.8
Total votes		24,301	100.0

=== Republican primary ===
==== Candidates ====
===== Nominee =====
- Jon Golnik, business consultant and nominee for the 5th district in 2010

===== Eliminated in primary =====
- Tom Weaver, businessman and candidate for the 5th district in 2010

==== Primary results ====
Republican primary results
Party	Candidate	Votes	%
Republican	Jonathan Golnik	12,928	66.3
Republican	Thomas Weaver	6,527	33.5
Republican	Write-ins	38	0.2
Total votes		19,493	100.0

=== General election ===
==== Polling ====
Poll source	Date(s) administered	Sample size	Margin of error	Niki Tsongas (D)	Jon Golnik (R)	Undecided
Stinson (R-Golnik)	September 16, 2012	549	± 4.0%	52%	45%	3%

==== Predictions ====
Source	Ranking	As of
The Cook Political Report	Safe D	November 5, 2012
Rothenberg	Safe D	November 2, 2012
Roll Call	Safe D	November 4, 2012
Sabato's Crystal Ball	Safe D	November 5, 2012
NY Times	Safe D	November 4, 2012
RCP	Safe D	November 4, 2012
The Hill	Safe D	November 4, 2012

==== Results ====
Massachusetts's 3rd congressional district, 2012
Party	Candidate	Votes	%
Democratic	Niki Tsongas (incumbent)	212,119	65.9
Republican	Jon Golnik	109,372	34.0
n/a	Write-ins	262	0.1
Total votes		321,753	100.0
Democratic hold			

== District 4 ==
2012 Massachusetts's 4th congressional district election
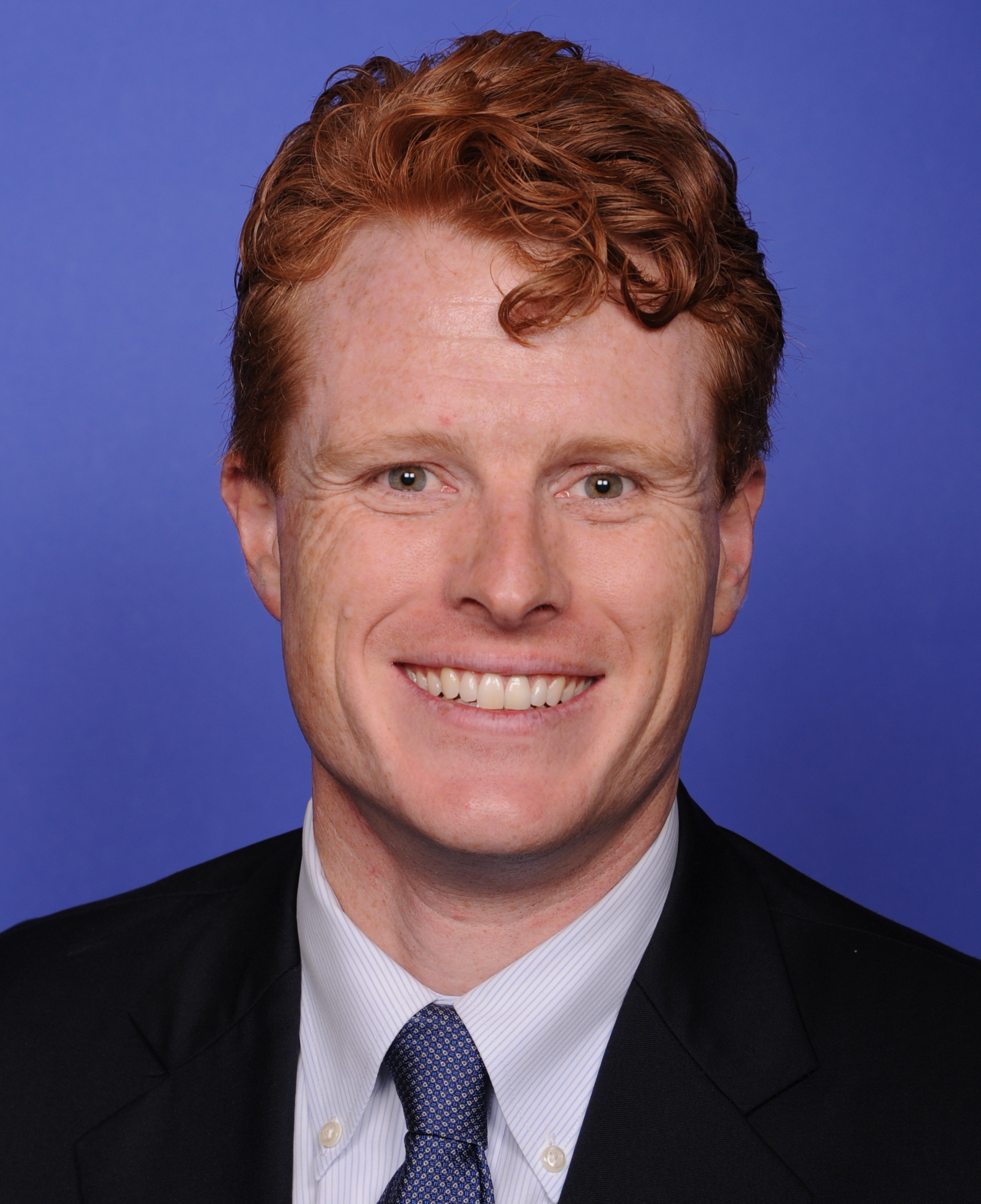

Nominee	Joseph Kennedy III	Sean Bielat
Party	Democratic	Republican
Popular vote	221,303	129,936
Percentage	61.1%	35.9%
- County results Kennedy: 50–60% 60–70% 70–80% Bielat: 50–60%
U.S. Representative before election
Barney Frank
Democratic
Elected U.S. Representative
Joseph Kennedy III
Democratic

Democrat Barney Frank, who has represented the 4th district since 1981, retired rather than run for re-election.

=== Democratic primary ===
==== Candidates ====
===== Nominee =====
- Joseph Kennedy III, Middlesex County assistant district attorney

===== Eliminated in primary =====
- Rachel Brown, LaRouche activist and candidate for this seat in 2010
- Herb Robinson, software engineer

===== Withdrawn =====
- Paul Heroux, businessman

===== Declined =====
- Ruth Balser, state representative
- Michael Burstein, author and member of the Brookline Town Meeting
- Cynthia Creem, state senator
- William A. Flanagan, Mayor of Fall River
- Barney Frank, incumbent U.S. Representative
- Deborah Goldberg, former chair of the Brookline Board of Selectmen
- Alan Khazei, co-founder of the City Year non-profit
- Jesse Mermell, Brookline Selectwoman
- Marc Pacheco, state senator
- Michael P. Ross, Boston City Councilor
- James Segel, former state representative
- David Simas, former policy adviser to Governor Deval Patrick
- Sam Sutter, Bristol County district attorney
- James E. Timilty, state senator
- Setti Warren, mayor of Newton
- Mike Rodrigues, state senator
- James Vallee, state representative

==== Primary results ====
Democratic primary results
Party	Candidate	Votes	%
Democratic	Joseph P. Kennedy, III	36,557	90.0
Democratic	Rachel Brown	2,635	6.5
Democratic	Herb Robinson	6,059	3.4
Democratic	Write-ins	73	0.1
Total votes		45,324	100.0

=== Republican primary ===
==== Candidates ====
===== Nominee =====
- Sean Bielat, technology executive and nominee for this seat in 2010

===== Eliminated in primary =====
- Elizabeth Childs, psychiatrist and member of the Brookline School Committee
- David Steinhof, dentist

===== Declined =====
- Jay Barrows, state representative
- Brian Herr, former Hopkinton Selectman
- Richard J. Ross, state senator
- Tom Wesley, businessman and nominee for the 2nd district in 2010

==== Primary results ====
Republican primary results
Party	Candidate	Votes	%
Republican	Sean Bielat	14,834	73.2
Republican	Elizabeth Childs	2,735	13.5
Republican	David L. Steinhof	2,669	13.2
Republican	Write-ins	25	0.1
Total votes		20,263	100.0

=== General election ===
==== Endorsements ====
Sean Bielat (R)

Organizations

- National Republican Congressional Committee "On the Radar" Program

==== Polling ====
Poll source	Date(s) administered	Sample size	Margin of error	Joseph Kennedy III (D)	Sean Bielat (R)	Other	Undecided
UMass Lowell/Boston Herald	February 2–8, 2012	408	± 6.4%	60%	28%	4%	7%

==== Predictions ====
Source	Ranking	As of
The Cook Political Report	Safe D	November 5, 2012
Rothenberg	Safe D	November 2, 2012
Roll Call	Safe D	November 4, 2012
Sabato's Crystal Ball	Safe D	November 5, 2012
NY Times	Safe D	November 4, 2012
RCP	Safe D	November 4, 2012
The Hill	Safe D	November 4, 2012

==== Results ====
Massachusetts's 4th congressional district, 2012
Party	Candidate	Votes	%
Democratic	Joseph Kennedy III	221,303	61.1
Republican	Sean Bielat	129,936	35.9
Independent	David Rosa	10,741	3.0
n/a	Write-ins	265	0.1
Total votes		362,245	100.0
Democratic hold			

== District 5 ==
2012 Massachusetts's 5th congressional district election
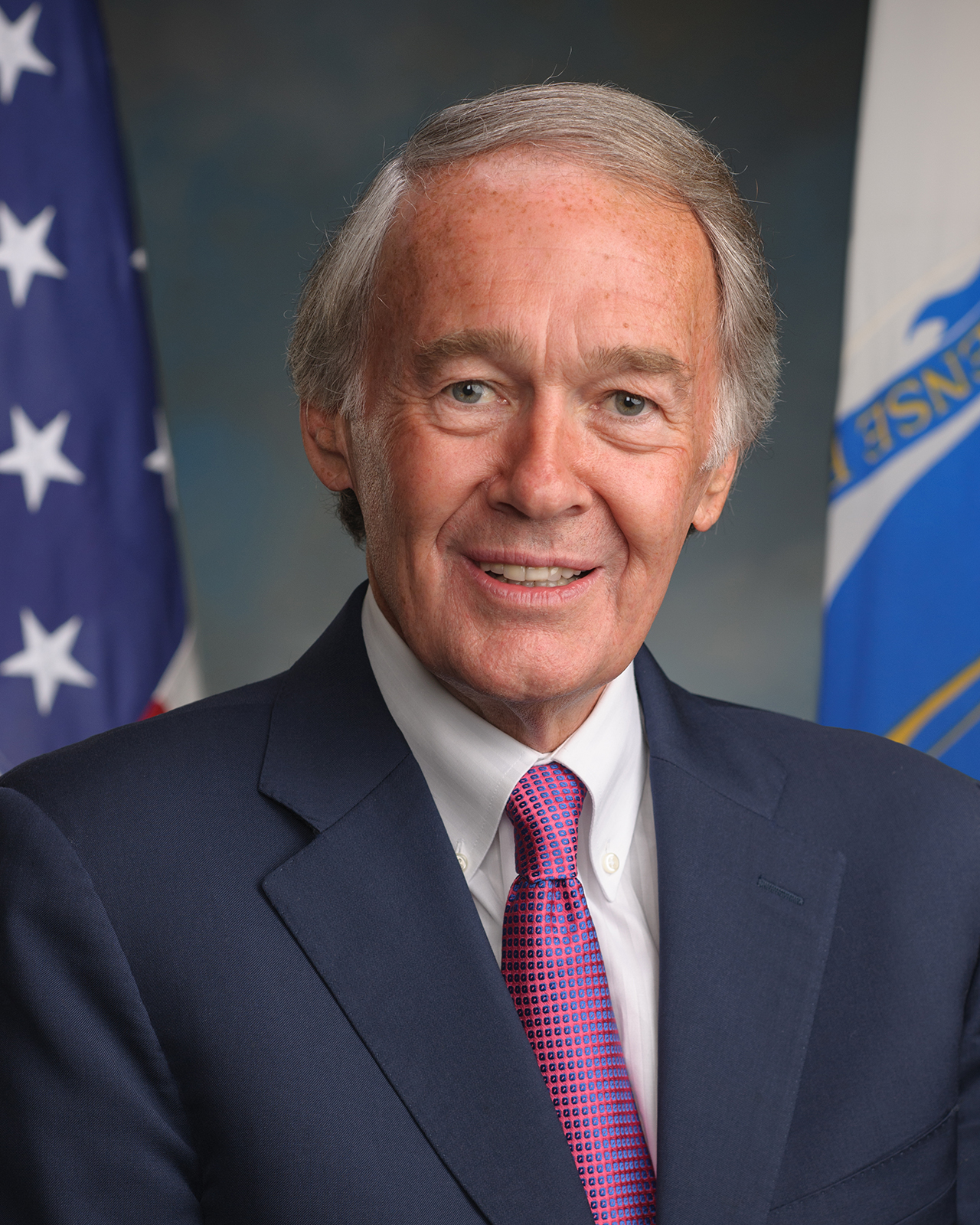

Nominee	Ed Markey	Tom Tierney
Party	Democratic	Republican
Popular vote	257,490	82,944
Percentage	75.5%	24.3%
- County results Markey: 50–60% 70–80%
U.S. Representative before election
Ed Markey
Democratic
Elected U.S. Representative
Ed Markey
Democratic

Democrat Ed Markey was redistricted from the 7th district, having represented it since 1976.

=== Democratic primary ===
==== Candidates ====
===== Nominee =====
- Ed Markey, incumbent U.S. Representative

==== Primary results ====
Democratic primary results
Party	Candidate	Votes	%
Democratic	Ed Markey (incumbent)	38,196	99.2
Democratic	Write-ins	316	0.8
Total votes		38,512	100.0

=== Republican primary ===
==== Candidates ====
===== Nominee =====
- Tom Tierney, consulting actuary

===== Eliminated in primary =====
- Frank John Addivinola Jr., attorney
- Jeff Semon, financial consultant

===== Withdrawn =====
- Gerry Dembrowski, physician and nominee for the 7th district in 2010

==== Primary results ====
Republican primary results
Party	Candidate	Votes	%
Republican	Tom Tierney	4,789	41.2
Republican	Frank John Addivinola, Jr.	3,531	30.3
Republican	Jeffrey Semon	3,250	27.9
Republican	Write-ins	65	0.6
Total votes		11,635	100.0

=== General election ===
==== Predictions ====
Source	Ranking	As of
The Cook Political Report	Safe D	November 5, 2012
Rothenberg	Safe D	November 2, 2012
Roll Call	Safe D	November 4, 2012
Sabato's Crystal Ball	Safe D	November 5, 2012
NY Times	Safe D	November 4, 2012
RCP	Safe D	November 4, 2012
The Hill	Safe D	November 4, 2012

==== Results ====
Massachusetts's 5th congressional district, 2012
Party	Candidate	Votes	%
Democratic	Ed Markey (incumbent)	257,490	75.5
Republican	Tom Tierney	82,944	24.3
n/a	Write-ins	675	0.2
Total votes		341,109	100.0
Democratic hold			

== District 6 ==
2012 Massachusetts's 6th congressional district election
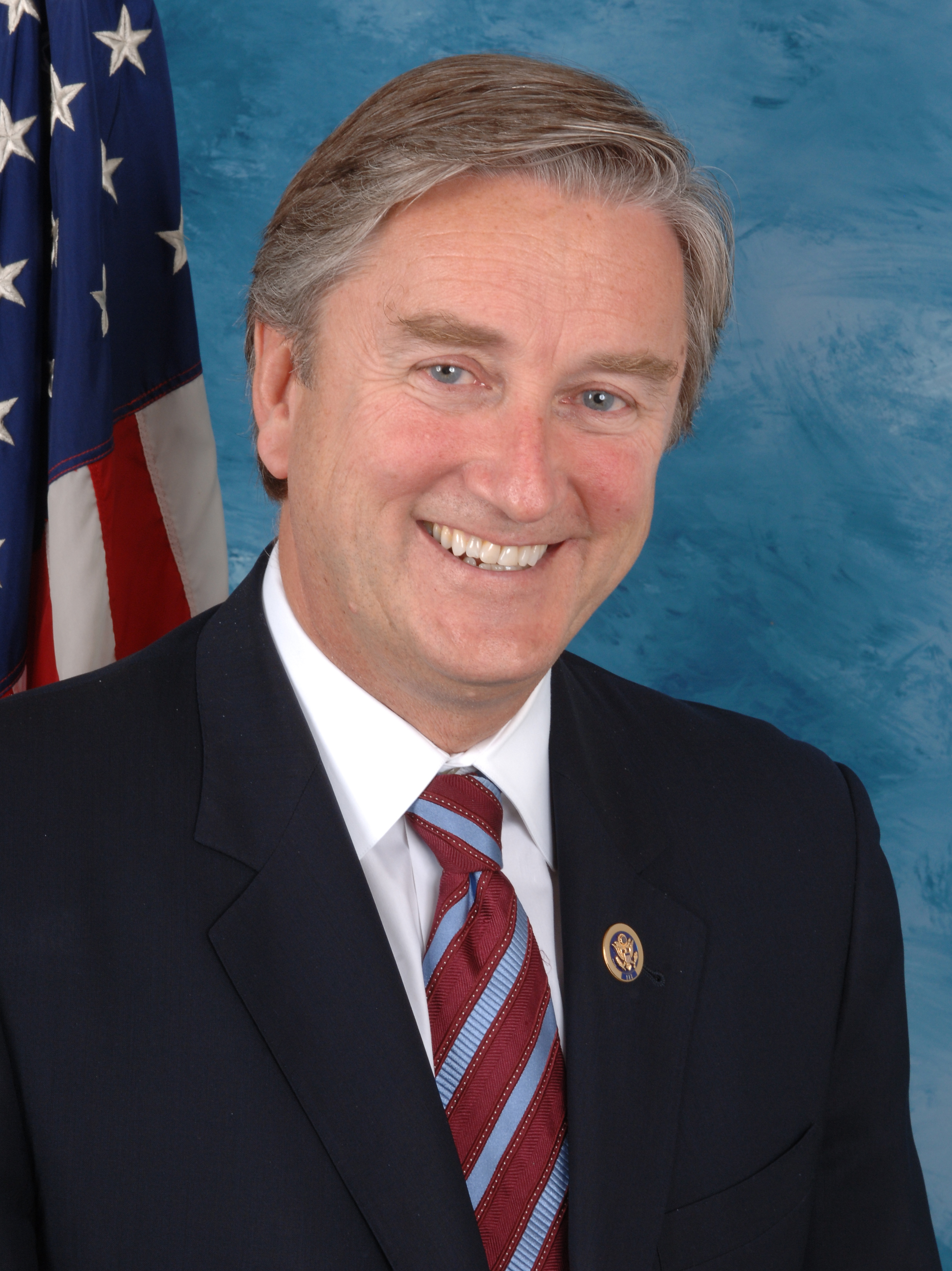

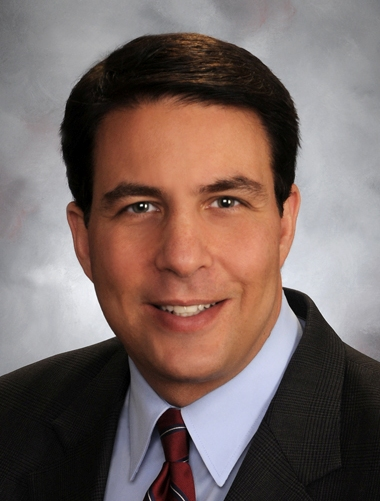
Nominee	John F. Tierney	Richard Tisei
Party	Democratic	Republican
Popular vote	180,942	176,612
Percentage	48.3%	47.1%
- Municipality results Tierney: 40–50% 50–60% 60–70% Tisei: 40–50% 50–60% 60–70% 70–80%
U.S. Representative before election
John F. Tierney
Democratic
Elected U.S. Representative
John F. Tierney
Democratic

At the time of the election, Democrat John F. Tierney had represented the 6th district since 1997. Daniel Fishman, a Libertarian candidate, who has never run for office before also ran. Veteran and military commentator Seth Moulton considered running in the general election as an independent, but decided against it in July 2012, citing the short time frame left for him to mount a serious campaign.

=== Democratic primary ===
==== Candidates ====
===== Nominee =====
- John F. Tierney, incumbent U.S. Representative

==== Primary results ====
Democratic primary results
Party	Candidate	Votes	%
Democratic	John F. Tierney (incumbent)	28,395	98.2
Democratic	Write-ins	517	1.8
Total votes		28,912	100.0

=== Republican primary ===
==== Candidates ====
===== Nominee =====
- Richard R. Tisei, former Minority Leader of the Massachusetts Senate and nominee for lieutenant governor in 2010

===== Withdrawn =====
- Bill Hudak, Tea Party-endorsed lawyer and candidate for this seat in 2010 but withdrew on January 23, 2012, to pursue "a business opportunity".

==== Primary results ====
Republican primary results
Party	Candidate	Votes	%
Republican	Richard R. Tisei	18,331	99.0
Republican	Write-ins	186	1.0
Total votes		19,493	100.0

=== General election ===
==== Endorsements ====
Richard Tisei (R)

Organizations

- National Republican Congressional Committee "Young Guns" Program

==== Debates ====
- Complete video of debate, October 10, 2012

==== Polling ====
Poll source	Date(s) administered	Sample size	Margin of error	John Tierney (D)	Richard Tisei (R)	Daniel Fishman (L)	Undecided
Boston Globe/UNH	September 21–27, 2012	371	± 5.1%	31%	37%	2%	30%
North Star Opinion Research (R-YG Action)	September 25–26, 2012	400	± 4.9%	37%	45%	—	18%
MassINC/WBUR	September 8–10, 2012	401	± 4.9%	46%	34%	7%	11%
McLaughlin (R-Tisei)	May 2–3, 2012	400	± 4.9%	33%	40%	—	27%

==== Predictions ====
Source	Ranking	As of
The Cook Political Report	Lean R (flip)	November 5, 2012
Rothenberg	Lean R (flip)	November 2, 2012
Roll Call	Lean R (flip)	November 4, 2012
Sabato's Crystal Ball	Lean R (flip)	November 5, 2012
NY Times	Tossup	November 4, 2012
RCP	Lean R (flip)	November 4, 2012
The Hill	Lean R (flip)	November 4, 2012

==== Results ====
Massachusetts's 6th congressional district, 2012
Party	Candidate	Votes	%
Democratic	John F. Tierney (incumbent)	180,942	48.3
Republican	Richard Tisei	176,612	47.1
Libertarian	Daniel Fishman	16,739	4.5
n/a	Write-ins	514	0.1
Total votes		374,807	100.0
Democratic hold			

== District 7 ==
2012 Massachusetts's 7th congressional district election
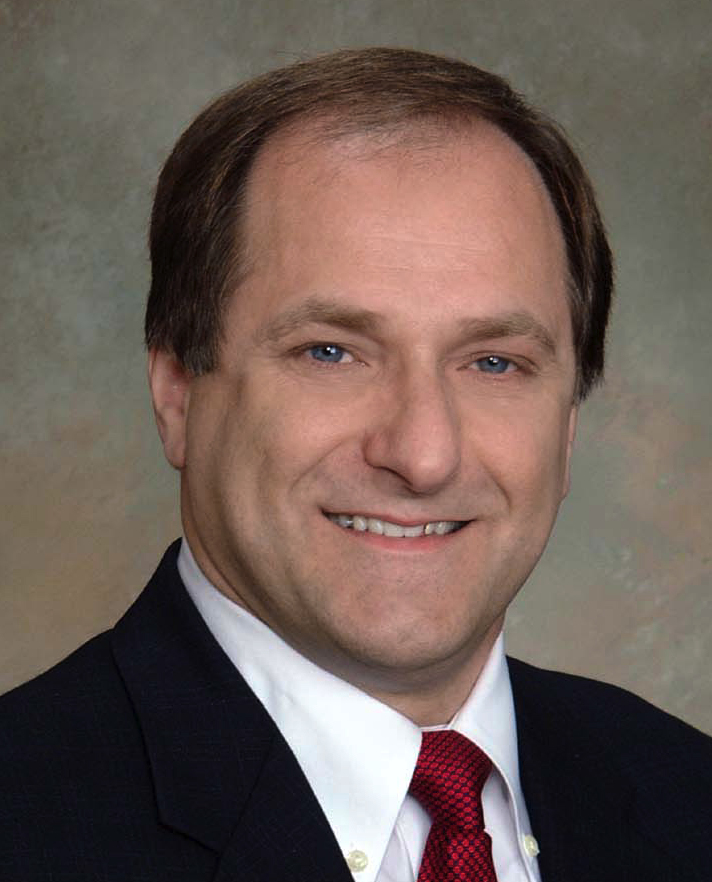

Nominee	Mike Capuano	Karla Romero
Party	Democratic	Independent
Popular vote	210,794	41,199
Percentage	83.4%	16.3%
- County results Capuano: 70–80% 80–90%
U.S. Representative before election
Mike Capuano
Democratic
Elected U.S. Representative
Mike Capuano
Democratic

In the redistricting Act, this district became a majority-minority district, increasing its reach over several minority precincts near Boston. Democrat Mike Capuano, who was redistricted from the 8th district, having represented it since 1999, ran for re-election.

=== Democratic primary ===
==== Candidates ====
===== Nominee =====
- Mike Capuano, incumbent U.S. Representative

==== Primary results ====
Democratic primary results
Party	Candidate	Votes	%
Democratic	Mike Capuano (incumbent)	32,445	98.6
Democratic	Write-ins	446	1.4
Total votes		32,891	100.0

=== Independents ===
- Karla Romero, founding President and CEO of the non-profit Mass Appeal International and a former Miss USA contestant

=== General election ===
==== Predictions ====
Source	Ranking	As of
The Cook Political Report	Safe D	November 5, 2012
Rothenberg	Safe D	November 2, 2012
Roll Call	Safe D	November 4, 2012
Sabato's Crystal Ball	Safe D	November 5, 2012
NY Times	Safe D	November 4, 2012
RCP	Safe D	November 4, 2012
The Hill	Safe D	November 4, 2012

==== Results ====
Massachusetts's 7th congressional district, 2012
Party	Candidate	Votes	%
Democratic	Mike Capuano (incumbent)	210,794	83.4
Independent	Karla Romero	41,199	16.3
n/a	Write-ins	843	0.2
Total votes		252,836	100.0
Democratic hold			

== District 8 ==
2012 Massachusetts's 8th congressional district election
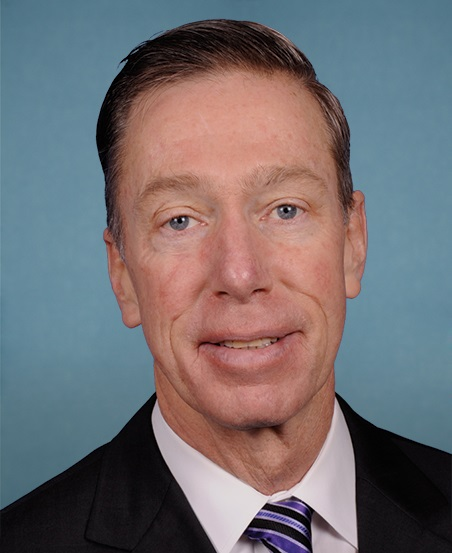

Nominee	Stephen Lynch	Joe Selvaggi
Party	Democratic	Republican
Popular vote	263,999	82,242
Percentage	76.1%	23.7%
- County results Lynch: 60–70% 70–80% 80–90%
U.S. Representative before election
Stephen Lynch
Democratic
Elected U.S. Representative
Stephen Lynch
Democratic

Democrat Stephen Lynch, who was redistricted from the old 9th district, ran in the 8th district.

Democrat William R. Keating, who was redistricted from the old 10th district, announced that he would move to Cape Cod, and run there, putting him in the new 9th district (most of which includes his incumbent district) instead of competing against Lynch.

=== Democratic primary ===
==== Candidates ====
===== Nominee =====
- Stephen Lynch, incumbent U.S. Representative

===== Declined =====
- William R. Keating, incumbent U.S. Representative

==== Primary results ====
Democratic primary results
Party	Candidate	Votes	%
Democratic	Stephen Lynch (incumbent)	29,352	98.8
Democratic	Write-ins	369	1.2
Total votes		29,721	100.0

=== Republican primary ===
==== Candidates ====
===== Nominee =====
- Joe Selvaggi, US Navy veteran of the first Gulf War and small business owner

===== Eliminated in primary =====
- Matias Temperley, Iraq War veteran and student

==== Primary results ====
Democratic primary results
Party	Candidate	Votes	%
Republican	Joe Selvaggi	5,968	59.1
Republican	Matias Temperley	4,081	40.4
Republican	Write-ins	47	0.5
Total votes		10,096	100.0

=== General election ===
==== Predictions ====
Source	Ranking	As of
The Cook Political Report	Safe D	November 5, 2012
Rothenberg	Safe D	November 2, 2012
Roll Call	Safe D	November 4, 2012
Sabato's Crystal Ball	Safe D	November 5, 2012
NY Times	Safe D	November 4, 2012
RCP	Safe D	November 4, 2012
The Hill	Safe D	November 4, 2012

==== Results ====
Massachusetts's 8th congressional district, 2012
Party	Candidate	Votes	%
Democratic	Stephen Lynch (incumbent)	263,999	76.1
Republican	Joe Selvaggi	82,242	23.7
n/a	Write-ins	570	0.2
Total votes		346,811	100.0
Democratic hold			

== District 9 ==
2012 Massachusetts's 9th congressional district election
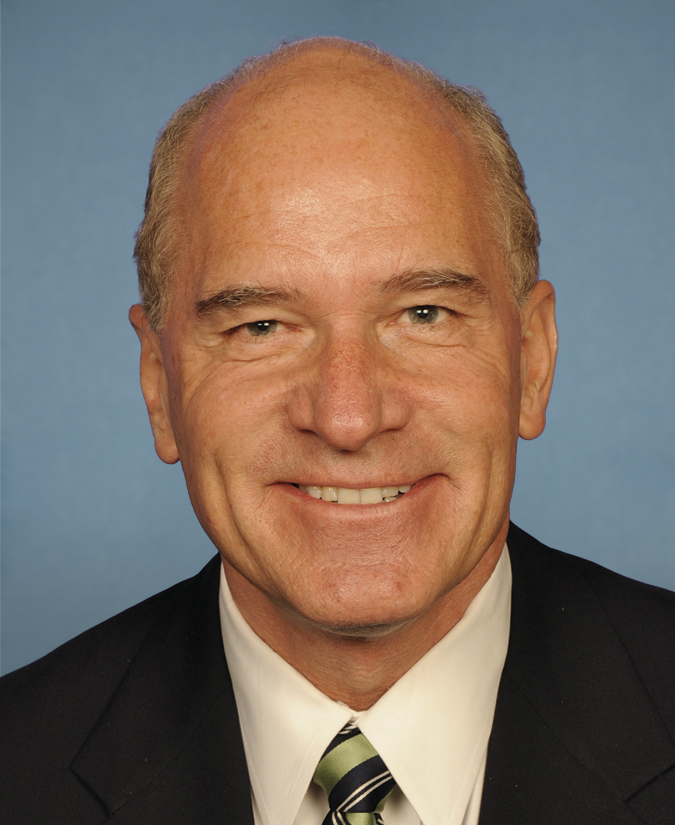

Nominee	William R. Keating	Christopher Sheldon	Daniel Botelho
Party	Democratic	Republican	Independent
Popular vote	212,754	116,531	32,655
Percentage	58.7%	32.2%	9.0%
- Municipality results Keating: 40–50% 50–60% 60–70% 70–80% 80–90% 90–100%
U.S. Representative before election
William R. Keating
Democratic
Elected U.S. Representative
William R. Keating
Democratic

There was no incumbent currently residing in this district, but incumbent Democrat William R. Keating, who has represented most of the district for the last two years when it was the 10th district, has a summer home there. As discussed above, he moved to the 9th District. Bristol County

=== Democratic primary ===
==== Candidates ====
===== Nominee =====
- William R. Keating, incumbent

===== Eliminated in primary =====
- Sam Sutter, Bristol County District Attorney

===== Declined =====
- Mark Montigny, state senator
- William A. Flanagan, Mayor of Fall River
- Scott W. Lang, former mayor of New Bedford
- Therese Murray, President of the Massachusetts Senate
- Robert O'Leary, former state senator

==== Primary results ====
Democratic primary results
Party	Candidate	Votes	%
Democratic	William Richard Keating (incumbent)	31,366	59.1
Democratic	Samuel Sutter	21,675	40.8
Democratic	Write-ins	47	0.1
Total votes		53,088	100.0

=== Republican primary ===
==== Candidates ====
===== Nominee =====
- Christopher Sheldon, businessman

===== Eliminated in primary =====
- Adam Chaprales, former Sandwich Selectman

===== Declined =====
- Timothy Cruz, Plymouth County District Attorney
- Vinny deMacedo, state representative
- Thomas Hodgson, Bristol County Sheriff
- Jeff Perry, former state representative 2010 Republican nominee for Massachusetts' 10th congressional district will not run.

=== General election ===
==== Predictions ====
Source	Ranking	As of
The Cook Political Report	Safe D	November 5, 2012
Rothenberg	Safe D	November 2, 2012
Roll Call	Safe D	November 4, 2012
Sabato's Crystal Ball	Safe D	November 5, 2012
NY Times	Safe D	November 4, 2012
RCP	Safe D	November 4, 2012
The Hill	Safe D	November 4, 2012

==== Results ====
Massachusetts's 9th congressional district, 2012
Party	Candidate	Votes	%
Democratic	William R. Keating (incumbent)	212,754	58.7
Republican	Christopher Sheldon	116,531	32.2
Independent	Daniel Botelho	32,655	9.0
n/a	Write-ins	465	0.1
Total votes		359,060	100.0
Democratic hold			

== See also ==
- United States Senate election in Massachusetts, 2012

Preceded by 2010 elections	United States House elections in Massachusetts; 2012	Succeeded by 2014 elections
