= 2010 United States House of Representatives elections in Massachusetts =

- November 2, 2010

All 10 Massachusetts seats in the United States House of Representatives
	Majority party	Minority party
Party	Democratic	Republican
Last election	10	0
Seats won	10	0
Seat change	Steady	Steady
Popular vote	1,335,738	808,305
Percentage	60.05%	36.34%
Swing	▼26.16%	▲24.22%
- Democratic 40–50% 50–60% 60–70% 90>%

The 2010 United States House of Representatives elections in Massachusetts were held on November 2, 2010, to determine who would represent the state of Massachusetts in the U.S. House of Representatives. Massachusetts has ten seats in the House, apportioned according to the 2000 United States census. Representatives are elected for two-year terms; those elected will serve in the 112th Congress from January 3, 2011, until January 3, 2013. All current representatives are member of the Democratic Party and none of the ten faced major party opposition in 2008.

== Overview ==
United States House of Representatives elections in Massachusetts, 2010
Party	Votes	Percentage	Seats	+/–
Democratic	1,335,738	60.05%	10	—
Republican	808,305	36.34%	0	—
Independents	80,212	3.61%	0	—
Totals	2,224,255	100.00%	10	—

=== By district ===
Results of the 2010 United States House of Representatives elections in Massachusetts by district:

District	Democratic		Republican		Others		Total		Result
District	Votes	%	Votes	%	Votes	%	Votes	%	Result
District 1	128,011	60.00%	74,418	34.88%	10,935	5.12%	213,364	100.0%	Democratic hold
District 2	122,751	57.33%	91,209	42.60%	164	1.80%	214,124	100.0%	Democratic hold
District 3	122,708	56.46%	85,124	39.16%	9,520	4.38%	217,352	100.0%	Democratic hold
District 4	126,194	53.90%	101,517	43.36%	6,416	2.74%	234,127	100.0%	Democratic hold
District 5	122,858	54.84%	94,646	42.25%	6,525	2.91%	224,029	100.0%	Democratic hold
District 6	142,732	56.85%	107,930	42.99%	419	0.17%	251,081	100.0%	Democratic hold
District 7	145,696	66.42%	73,467	33.49%	194	0.09%	219,357	100.0%	Democratic hold
District 8	134,974	98.05%	0	0.00%	2,686	1.95%	137,660	100.0%	Democratic hold
District 9	157,071	68.30%	59,965	26.08%	12,928	5.62%	229,964	100.0%	Democratic hold
District 10	132,743	46.87%	120,029	42.38%	30,425	10.74%	283,197	100.0%	Democratic hold
Total	1,335,738	60.05%	808,305	36.34%	80,212	3.61%	2,224,255	100.0%	

== District 1 ==
2010 Massachusetts's 1st congressional district election
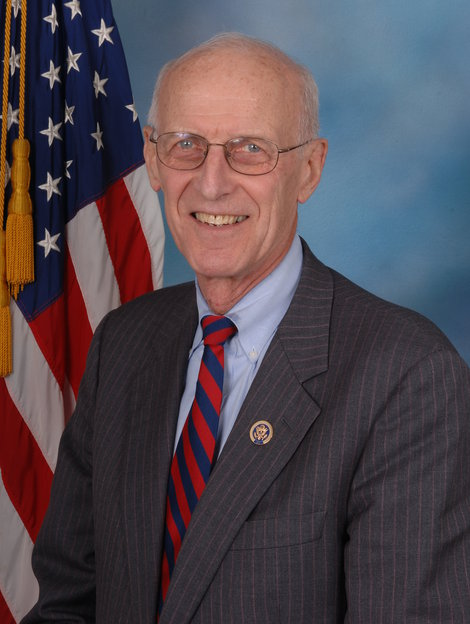

Nominee	John Olver	Bill Gunn	Michael Engel
Party	Democratic	Republican	Independent
Popular vote	127,474	73,952	10,841
Percentage	60.1%	34.8%	5.1%
- Municipality results Olver: 40–50% 50–60% 60–70% 70–80% 80–90% Gunn: 40–50% 50–60%
U.S. Representative before election
John Olver
Democratic
Elected U.S. Representative
John Olver
Democratic

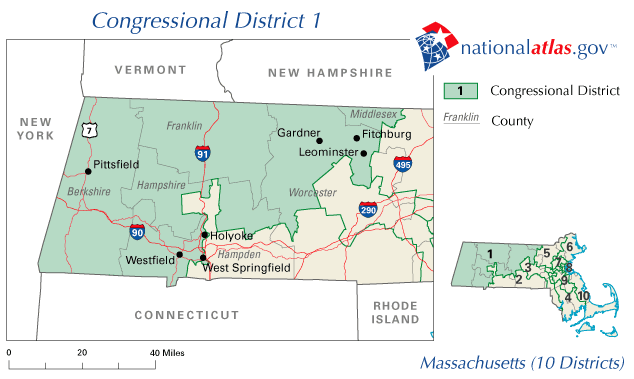

Massachusetts's 1st congressional district covers roughly the northwest half of the state. It has been represented by Democrat John Olver since June 1991.

=== Predictions ===
Source	Ranking	As of
The Cook Political Report	Safe D	November 1, 2010
Rothenberg	Safe D	November 1, 2010
Sabato's Crystal Ball	Safe D	November 1, 2010
RCP	Safe D	November 1, 2010
CQ Politics	Safe D	October 28, 2010
New York Times	Safe D	November 1, 2010
FiveThirtyEight	Safe D	November 1, 2010

Massachusetts's 1st congressional district election, 2010
Party	Candidate	Votes	%
Democratic	John Olver (incumbent)	127,474	60.1
Republican	Bill Gunn	73,952	34.8
Independent	Michael Engel	10,841	5.1
Total votes		212,267	100
Turnout			

== District 2 ==
2010 Massachusetts's 2nd congressional district election
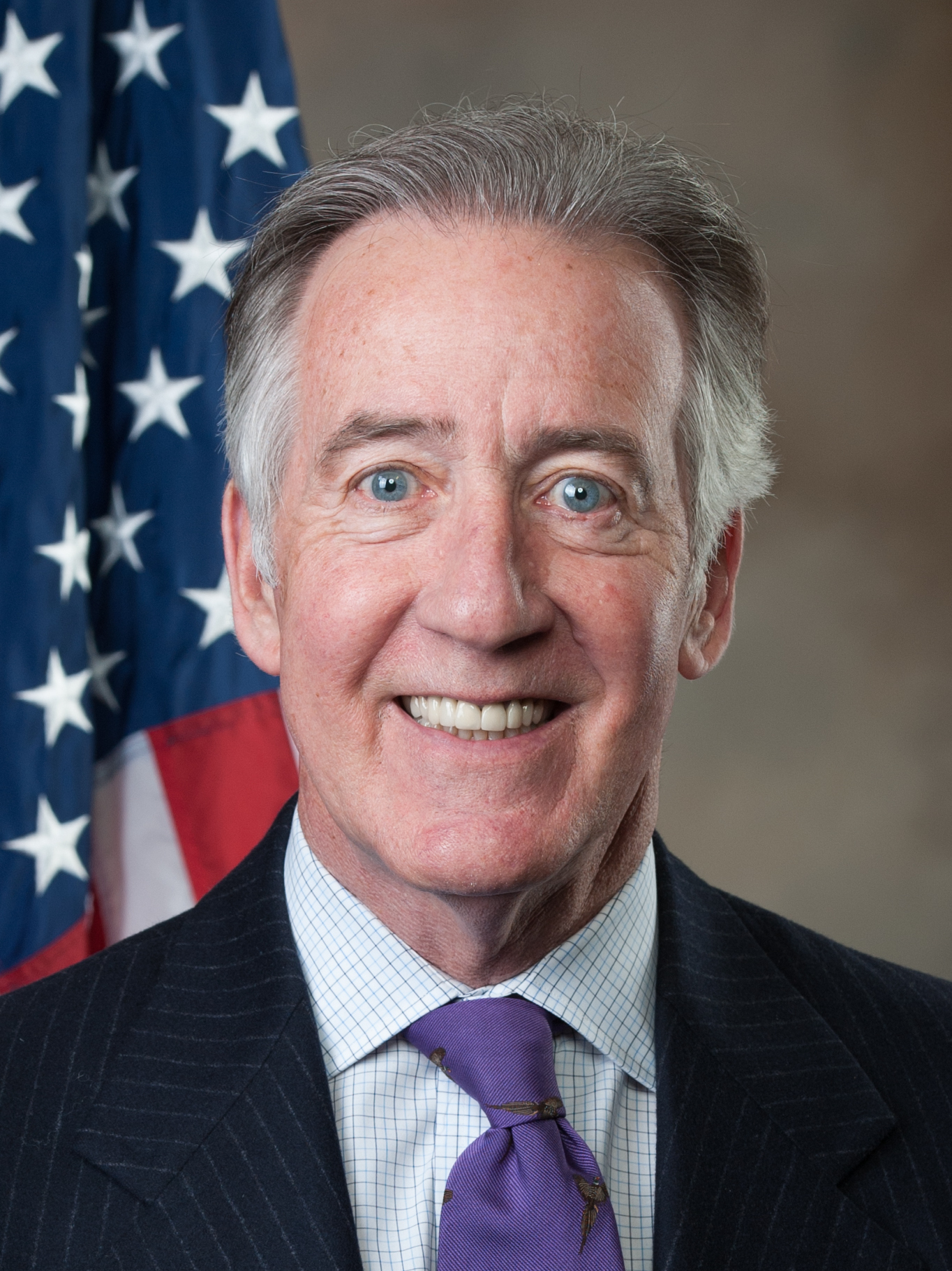
Nominee	Richard Neal
Party	Democratic
Popular vote	122,547
Percentage	57.3%
U.S. Representative before election
Richard Neal
Democratic
Elected U.S. Representative
Richard Neal
Democratic

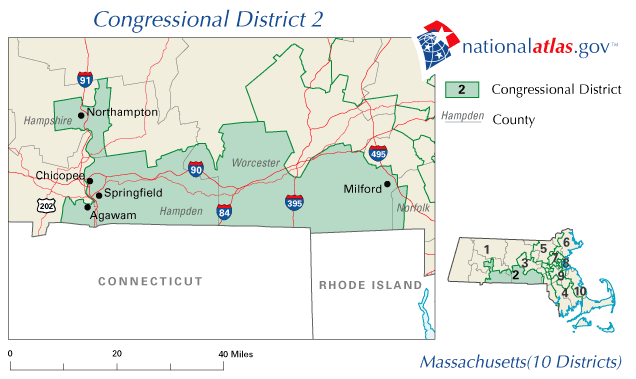

Massachusetts's 2nd congressional district lies in the south-central part of the state. It has been represented by Democrat Richard Neal since 1989.

The Republican Party nominee is Tom Wesley, who defeated Jay Fleitman in the September primary. Democrat Neal has not faced a Republican challenger since 1996.

=== Predictions ===
Source	Ranking	As of
The Cook Political Report	Safe D	November 1, 2010
Rothenberg	Safe D	November 1, 2010
Sabato's Crystal Ball	Safe D	November 1, 2010
RCP	Safe D	November 1, 2010
CQ Politics	Safe D	October 28, 2010
New York Times	Safe D	November 1, 2010
FiveThirtyEight	Safe D	November 1, 2010

Massachusetts's 2nd congressional district election, 2010
Party	Candidate	Votes	%
Democratic	Richard Neal (incumbent)	122,547	57.3
Republican	Tom Wesley	91,181	42.7
Total votes		213,728	100
Turnout			

== District 3 ==
2010 Massachusetts's 3rd congressional district election
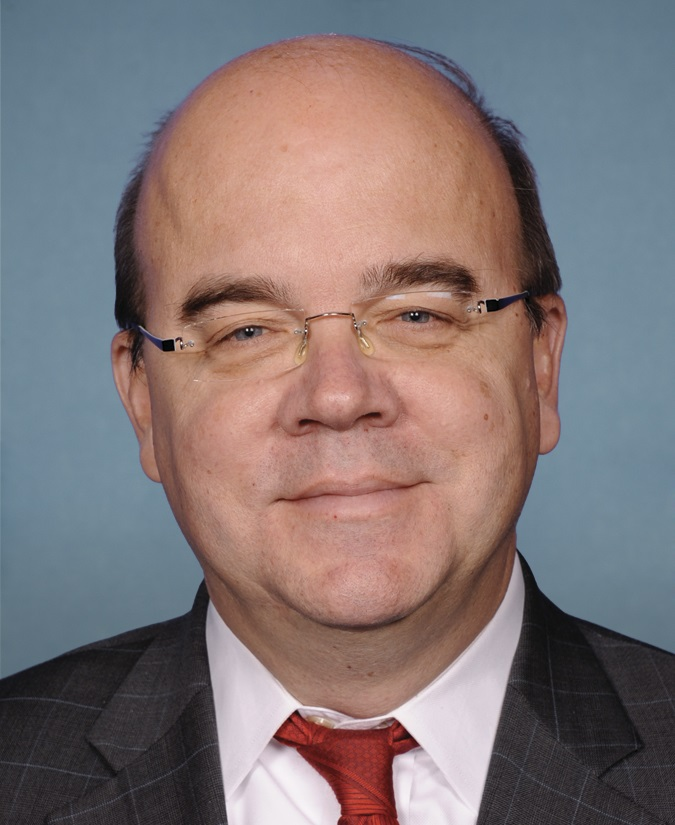

Nominee	Jim McGovern	Marty Lamb
Party	Democratic	Republican
Popular vote	122,357	84,972
Percentage	56.5%	39.2%
- Municipality results McGovern: 40–50% 50–60% 60–70% 70–80% Lamb: 40–50% 50–60%
U.S. Representative before election
Jim McGovern
Democratic
Elected U.S. Representative
Jim McGovern
Democratic

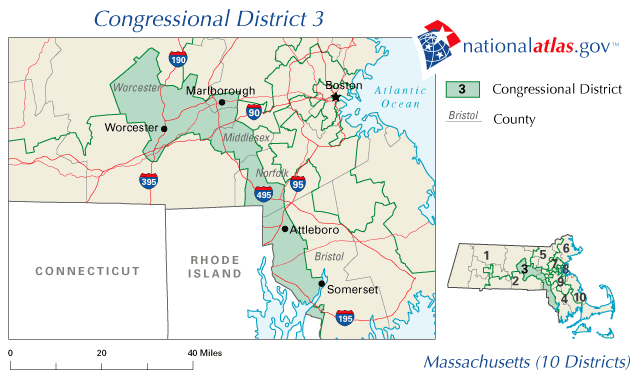

Massachusetts's 3rd congressional district lies in the central and southeastern part of the state. It has been represented by Democrat Jim McGovern since 1997.

=== Predictions ===
Source	Ranking	As of
The Cook Political Report	Safe D	November 1, 2010
Rothenberg	Safe D	November 1, 2010
Sabato's Crystal Ball	Safe D	November 1, 2010
RCP	Safe D	November 1, 2010
CQ Politics	Safe D	October 28, 2010
New York Times	Safe D	November 1, 2010
FiveThirtyEight	Safe D	November 1, 2010

Massachusetts's 3rd congressional district election, 2010
Party	Candidate	Votes	%
Democratic	Jim McGovern (incumbent)	122,357	56.5
Republican	Marty Lamb	84,972	39.2
Independent	Patrick Barron	9,304	4.3
Total votes		216,633	100
Turnout			

== District 4 ==
2010 Massachusetts's 4th congressional district election
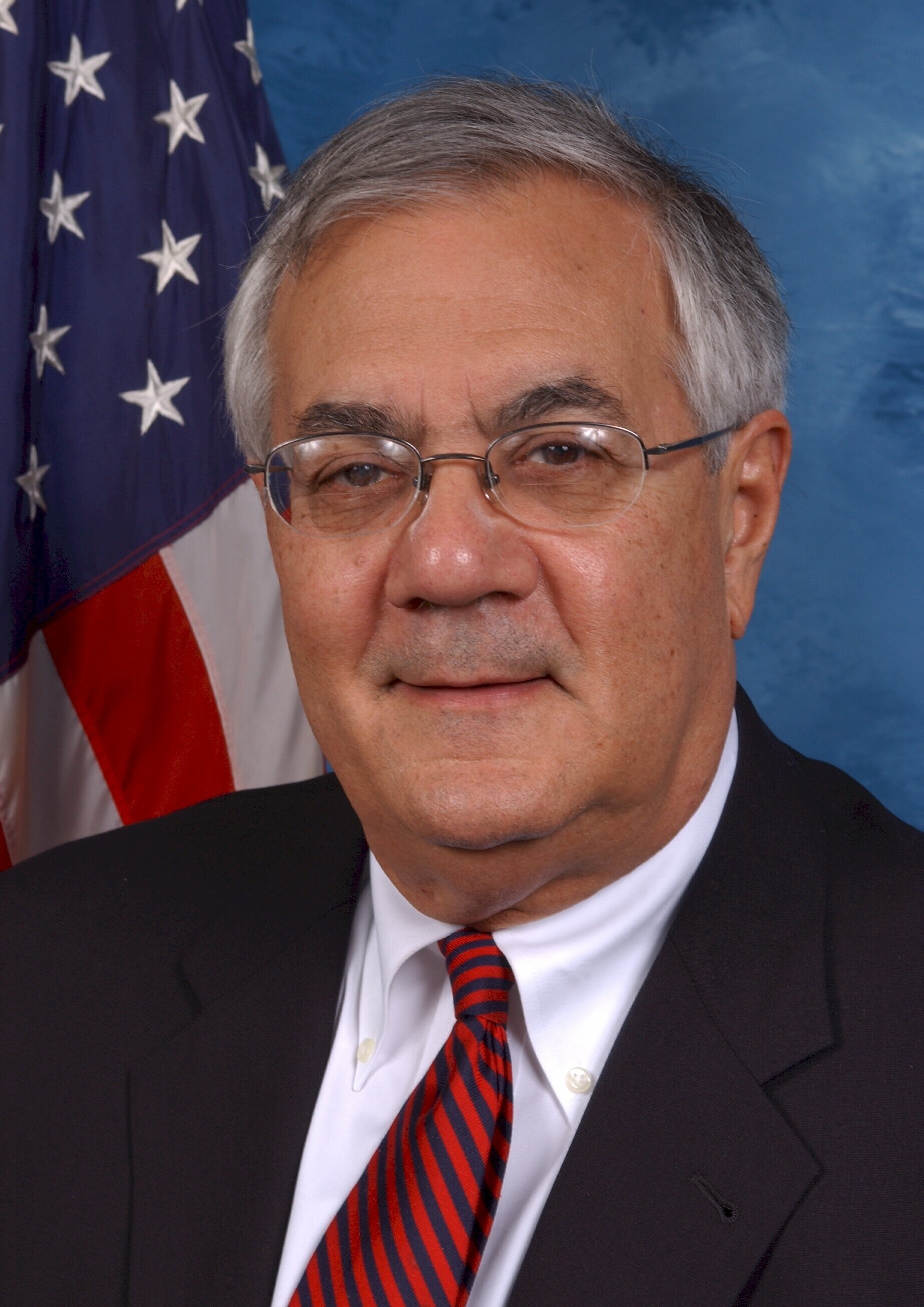

Nominee	Barney Frank	Sean Bielat
Party	Democratic	Republican
Popular vote	125,823	101,315
Percentage	53.9%	43.4%
- Municipality results Frank: 40–50% 50–60% 60–70% 70–80% Bielat: 40–50% 50–60% 60–70%
U.S. Representative before election
Barney Frank
Democratic
Elected U.S. Representative
Barney Frank
Democratic

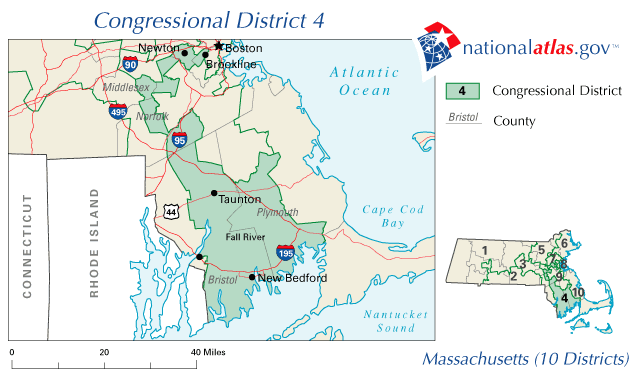

Massachusetts's 4th congressional district lies in the southern part of the state, including the South Coast region. It has been represented by Democrat Barney Frank since 1981. CQ Politics had forecast the race as 'Safe Democrat'. Rachel Brown, famous for comparing health care reform to a Nazi in front of Frank during a 2009 Town Hall meeting, ran unsuccessfully against Frank in the Democratic primary, losing 39,974 to 10,289. Sean Bielat, a technology executive from Brookline, won the Republican primary to challenge Frank, defeating Earl Sholley, the Republican Nominee from Norfolk in 2008, by a vote of 11,797 to 7,782.

=== Polling ===
Poll Source	Dates administered	Barney Frank (D)	Sean Bielat (R)	Undecided
Boston Globe/UNH	October 17–22, 2010	46%	33%	-
WPRI/Fleming	October 14–17, 2010	49%	37%	12%
Kiley & Co.	October 13–14, 2010	56%	37%	-
OnMessage Inc.	September 15–16, 2010	48%	38%	-

==== Predictions ====
Source	Ranking	As of
The Cook Political Report	Lean D	November 1, 2010
Rothenberg	Safe D	November 1, 2010
Sabato's Crystal Ball	Likely D	November 1, 2010
RCP	Lean D	November 1, 2010
CQ Politics	Likely D	October 28, 2010
New York Times	Lean D	November 1, 2010
FiveThirtyEight	Safe D	November 1, 2010

Massachusetts's 4th congressional district election, 2010
Party	Candidate	Votes	%
Democratic	Barney Frank (incumbent)	125,823	53.9
Republican	Sean Bielat	101,315	43.4
Independent	Susan Allen	3,430	1.5
Independent	Donald Jordan	2,871	1.2
Total votes		233,439	100
Turnout			

== District 5 ==
2010 Massachusetts's 5th congressional district election
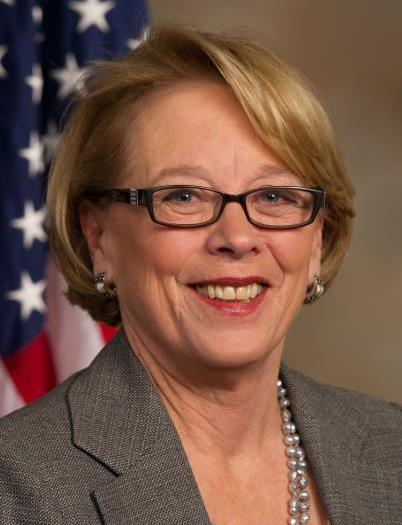
Nominee	Niki Tsongas
Party	Democratic
Popular vote	122,676
Percentage	54.9%
U.S. Representative before election
Niki Tsongas
Democratic
Elected U.S. Representative
Niki Tsongas
Democratic

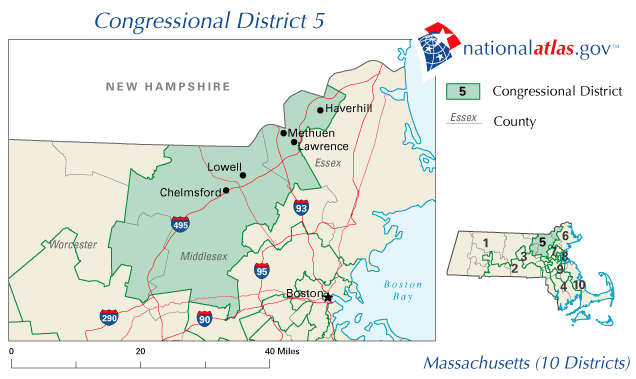

Massachusetts's 5th congressional district lies in the north-east part of the state. It has been represented by Democrat Niki Tsongas since she won a special election on October 16, 2007, upon the resignation of Marty Meehan (D).

=== Predictions ===
Source	Ranking	As of
The Cook Political Report	Likely D	November 1, 2010
Rothenberg	Likely D	November 1, 2010
Sabato's Crystal Ball	Safe D	November 1, 2010
RCP	Likely D	November 1, 2010
CQ Politics	Likely D	October 28, 2010
New York Times	Safe D	November 1, 2010
FiveThirtyEight	Safe D	November 1, 2010

Massachusetts's 5th congressional district election, 2010
Party	Candidate	Votes	%
Democratic	Niki Tsongas (incumbent)	122,676	54.9
Republican	Jon Golnik	94,501	42.3
Independent	Dale Brown	4,376	2.0
Independent	Bob Clark	1,986	0.9
Total votes		223,539	100
Turnout			

== District 6 ==
2010 Massachusetts's 6th congressional district election
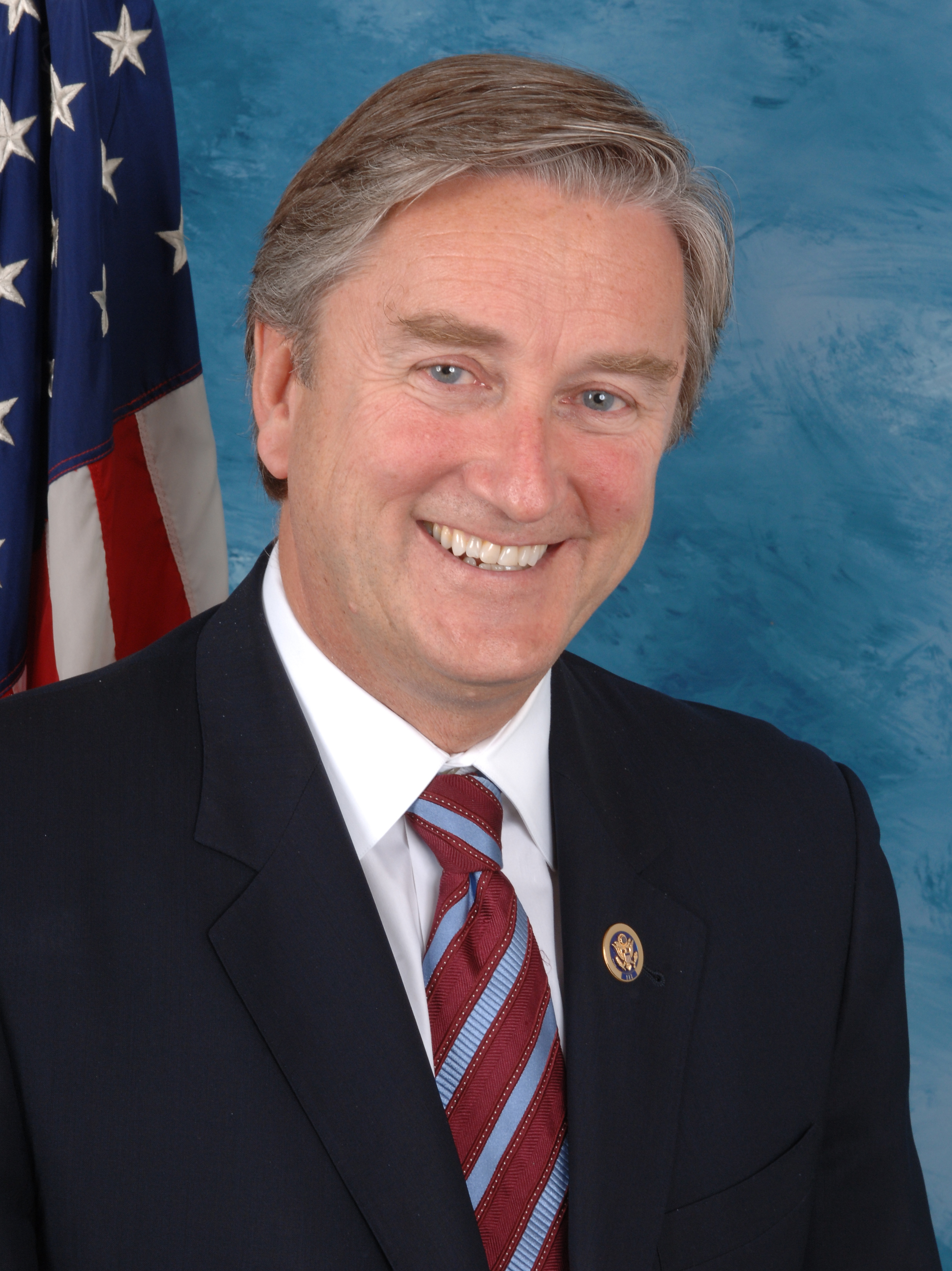

Nominee	John F. Tierney	Bill Hudak
Party	Democratic	Republican
Popular vote	142,456	107,739
Percentage	56.9%	43.1%
- Municipality results Tierney: 50–60% 60–70% 70–80% Hudak: 50–60%
U.S. Representative before election
John F. Tierney
Democratic
Elected U.S. Representative
John F. Tierney
Democratic

Massachusetts's 6th congressional district covers the north-east corner of the state. At the time of the election it had been represented by Democrat John F. Tierney since 1997.

=== Predictions ===
Source	Ranking	As of
The Cook Political Report	Likely D	November 1, 2010
Rothenberg	Safe D	November 1, 2010
Sabato's Crystal Ball	Safe D	November 1, 2010
RCP	Likely D	November 1, 2010
CQ Politics	Safe D	October 28, 2010
New York Times	Safe D	November 1, 2010
FiveThirtyEight	Safe D	November 1, 2010

Massachusetts's 6th congressional district election, 2010
Party	Candidate	Votes	%
Democratic	John F. Tierney (incumbent)	142,456	56.9
Republican	Bill Hudak	107,739	43.1
Total votes		250,195	100
Turnout			

== District 7 ==
2010 Massachusetts's 7th congressional district election
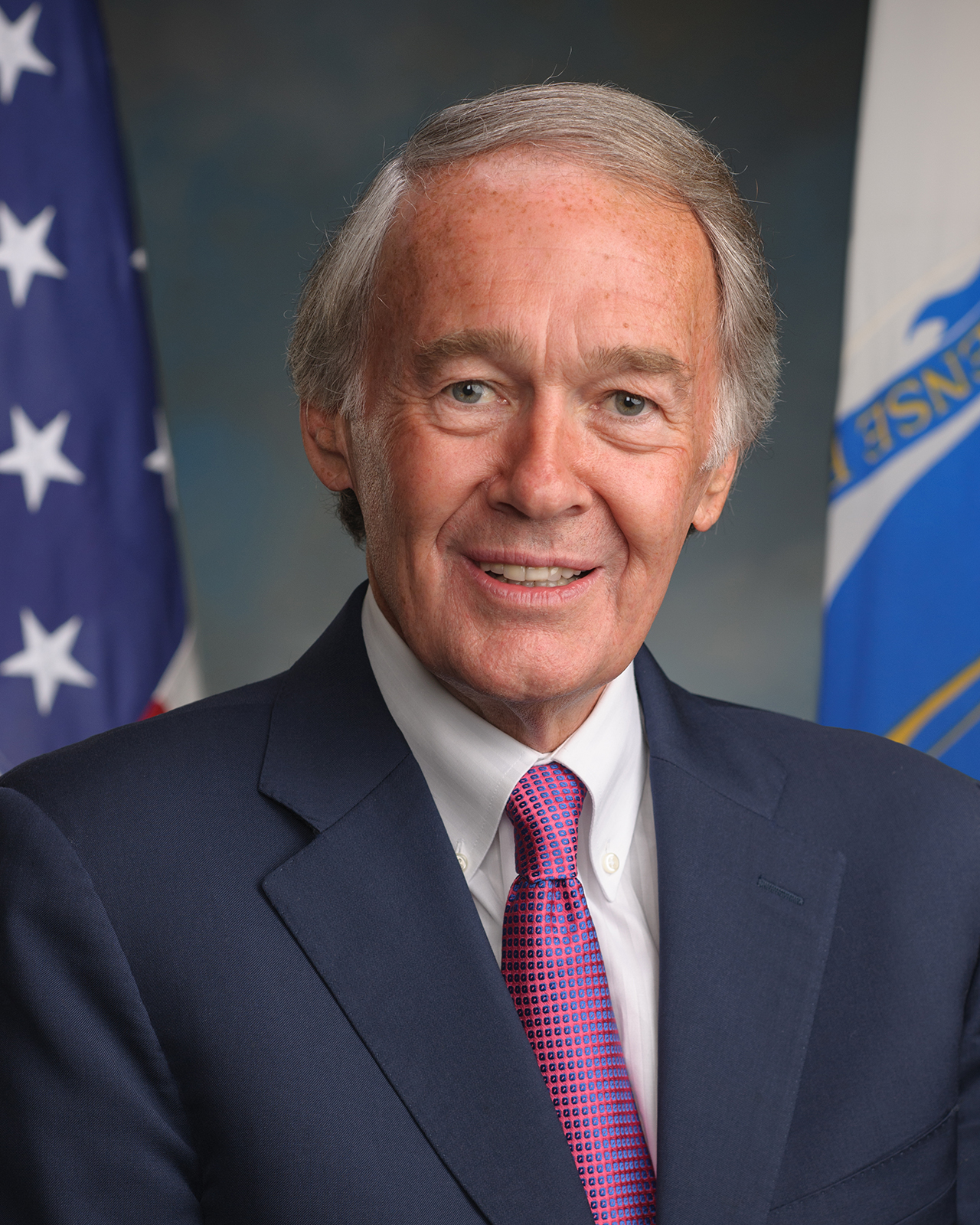

Nominee	Edward J. Markey	Gerry Dembrowski
Party	Democratic	Republican
Popular vote	141,364	73,006
Percentage	65.9%	34.1%
U.S. Representative before election
Edward J. Markey
Democratic
Elected U.S. Representative
Edward J. Markey
Democratic

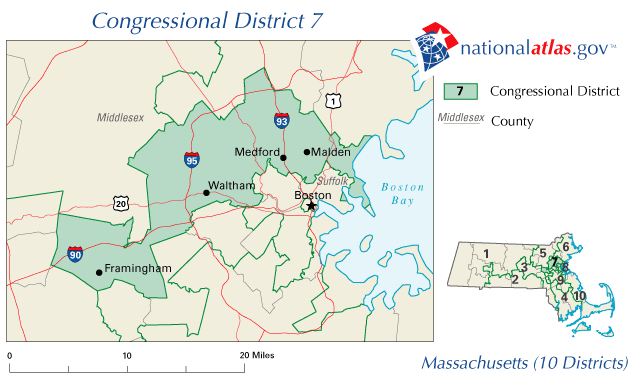

Massachusetts's 7th congressional district lies in the eastern part of the state, including some Boston suburbs. It was represented by Democrat Edward J. Markey from 1976 to 2013.

=== Predictions ===
Source	Ranking	As of
The Cook Political Report	Safe D	November 1, 2010
Rothenberg	Safe D	November 1, 2010
Sabato's Crystal Ball	Safe D	November 1, 2010
RCP	Safe D	November 1, 2010
CQ Politics	Safe D	October 28, 2010
New York Times	Safe D	November 1, 2010
FiveThirtyEight	Safe D	November 1, 2010

Massachusetts's 7th congressional district election, 2010
Party	Candidate	Votes	%
Democratic	Edward J. Markey (incumbent)	141,364	65.9
Republican	Gerry Dembrowski	73,006	34.1
Total votes		214,370	100
Turnout			

== District 8 ==
2010 Massachusetts's 8th congressional district election
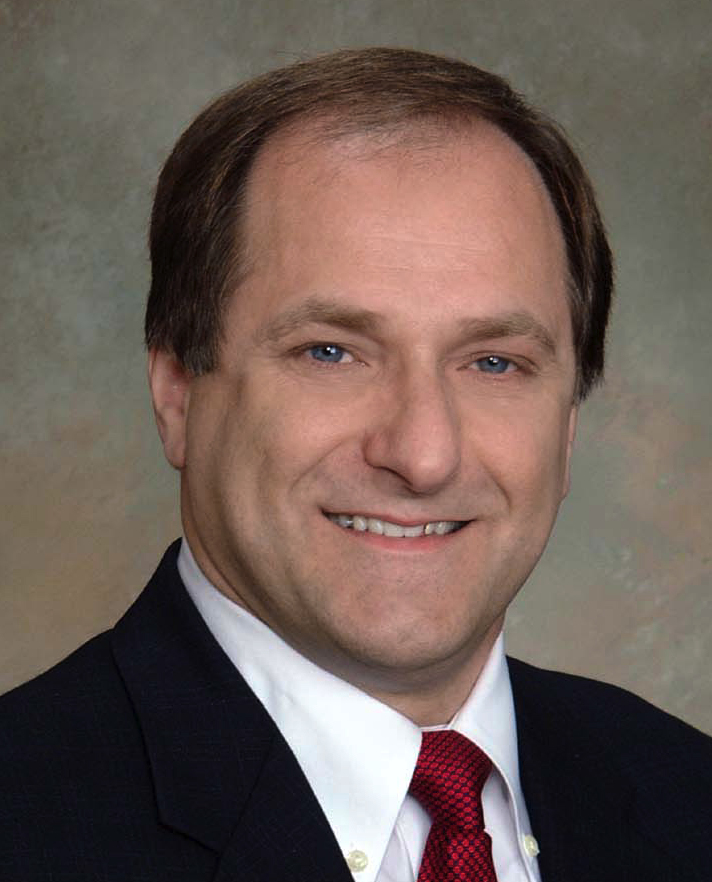
Nominee	Mike Capuano
Party	Democratic
Popular vote	Unopposed
U.S. Representative before election
Mike Capuano
Democratic
Elected U.S. Representative
Mike Capuano
Democratic

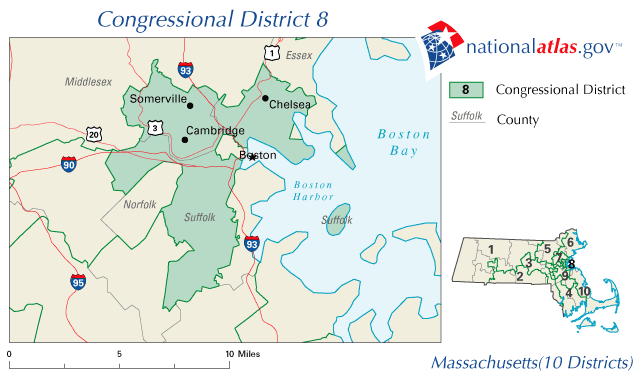

Massachusetts's 8th congressional district lies in the eastern part of the state, including part of Boston and the immediately adjacent cities of Cambridge, Somerville, and Chelsea. It has been represented by Democrat Mike Capuano since 1999. Capuano ran unopposed.

=== Predictions ===
Source	Ranking	As of
The Cook Political Report	Safe D	November 1, 2010
Rothenberg	Safe D	November 1, 2010
Sabato's Crystal Ball	Safe D	November 1, 2010
RCP	Safe D	November 1, 2010
CQ Politics	Safe D	October 28, 2010
New York Times	Safe D	November 1, 2010
FiveThirtyEight	Safe D	November 1, 2010

== District 9 ==
2010 Massachusetts's 9th congressional district election
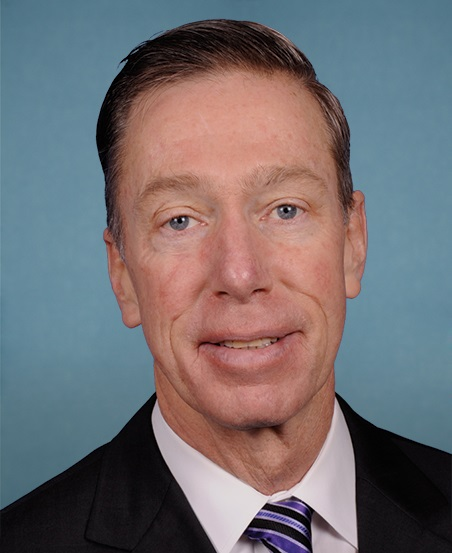

Nominee	Stephen Lynch	Vemon Harrison	Philip Dunkelbarger
Party	Democratic	Republican	Independent
Popular vote	156,079	60,120	12,833
Percentage	68.1%	26.2%	5.6%
U.S. Representative before election
Stephen Lynch
Democratic
Elected U.S. Representative
Stephen Lynch
Democratic

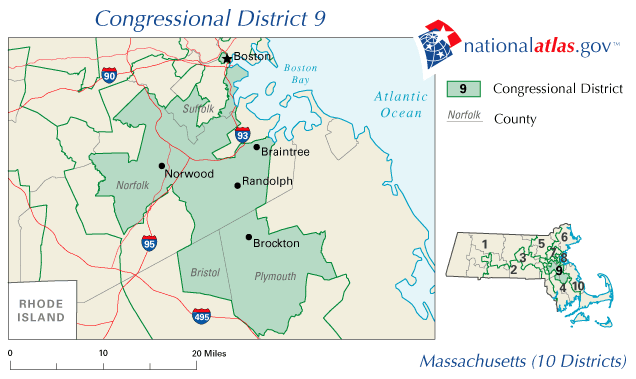

Massachusetts's 9th congressional district lies in the eastern part of the state, including part of Boston and some of its southern suburbs. It has been represented by Democrat Stephen Lynch since October 2001. CQ Politics forecasted the race as 'Safe Democrat'.

In response to Lynch's vote against health care reform, Needham selectwoman Harmony Wu announced she was considering a run against Lynch in the Democratic Primary, but announced on April 7, 2010, that she decided not to run. On April 22 Mac D'Alessandro, the New England political director of SEIU, announced his intention to challenge Lynch. Polling has indicated that Lynch is vulnerable to such a challenge.

=== Predictions ===
Source	Ranking	As of
The Cook Political Report	Safe D	November 1, 2010
Rothenberg	Safe D	November 1, 2010
Sabato's Crystal Ball	Safe D	November 1, 2010
RCP	Safe D	November 1, 2010
CQ Politics	Safe D	October 28, 2010
New York Times	Safe D	November 1, 2010
FiveThirtyEight	Safe D	November 1, 2010

Massachusetts's 9th congressional district election, 2010
Party	Candidate	Votes	%
Democratic	Stephen Lynch (incumbent)	156,079	68.1
Republican	Vemon Harrison	60,120	26.2
Independent	Philip Dunkelbarger	12,833	5.6
Total votes		229,032	100
Turnout			

== District 10 ==
2010 Massachusetts's 10th congressional district election
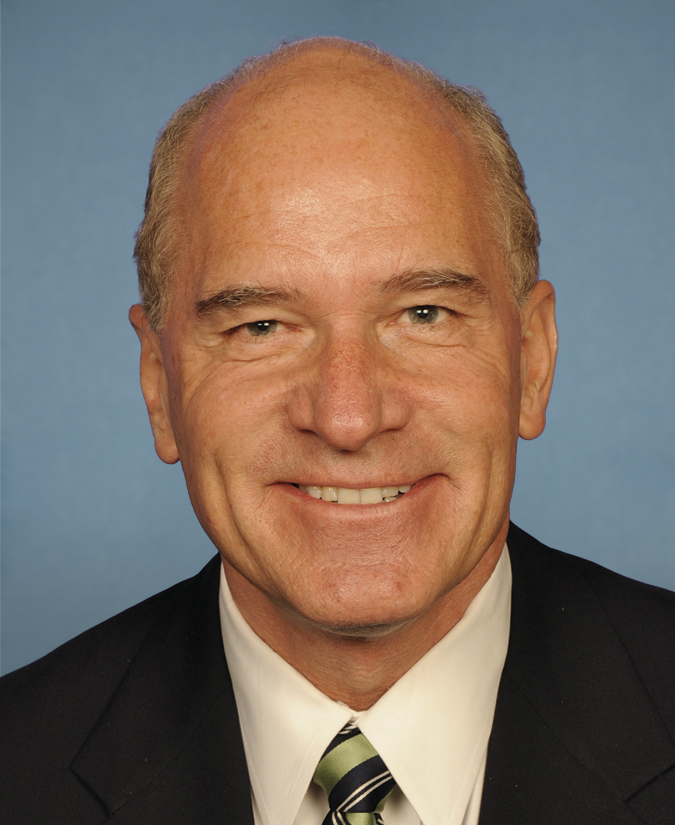

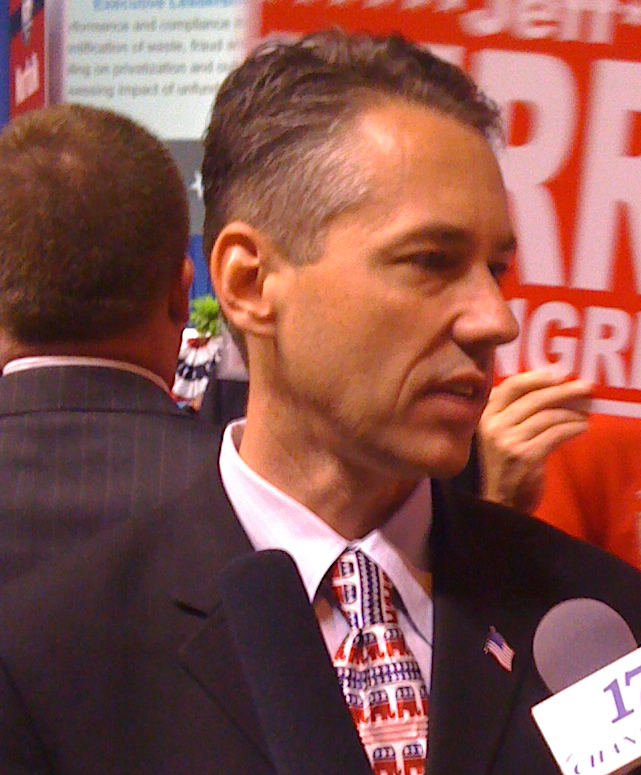

Nominee	William R. Keating	Jeff Perry	Maryanne Lewis
Party	Democratic	Republican	Independent
Popular vote	132,582	119,820	16,673
Percentage	46.9%	42.4%	5.9%
- Municipality results Keating: 40–50% 50–60% 60–70% 70–80% 80–90% Perry: 40–50% 50–60% 60–70%
U.S. Representative before election
Bill Delahunt
Democratic
Elected U.S. Representative
William R. Keating
Democratic

This was an open seat. Candidates were Democratic nominee William R. Keating, Republican nominee Jeff Perry, and Independents Maryanne Lewis and Jim Sheets.

Massachusetts's 10th congressional district covers the south-east part of the state, including parts of the South Shore and all of Cape Cod and The Islands. Democrat Bill Delahunt, who has represented the seat since 1997, announced in March 2010 that he did not plan to run for re-election. The Boston Globe, on April 30, 2010, reported that Democratic State Senator Robert O'Leary would announce his candidacy for the Democratic nomination for the seat on the day following. Joseph P. Kennedy III was considered a likely Democratic contender, but he chose not to run. It was reported in the Boston Globe, that District Attorney of Norfolk County William R. Keating also sought the Democratic nomination for the seat.

Republican Joe Malone, who ran against Ted Kennedy in 1988 and served as state treasurer from 1991 to 1999, unsuccessfully ran for the seat. Republican State Representative Jeff Perry also ran. Despite a movement to draft him into running, Republican State Senator Bob Hedlund decided not to enter this race. Ray Kasperowicz of Cohasset had also filed to run as a Republican, but also lost in the primary.

Malone received a donation from US-Cuba Democracy PAC. Perry received donations from the Sandwich and Nantucket Republican Town Committees, the Cape Cod Republican Club, as well as other PACs such as the committee to Elect Greer Swiston and the Cummings Committee.

=== Polling ===
Poll Source	Dates administered	Bill Keating (D)	Jeff Perry (R)	Undecided
Boston Globe/UNH	October 17–22, 2010	37%	33%	23%
NMB Research	October 20–21, 2010	43%	45%	-
MassINC Polling Group	October 13–15, 2010	46%	43%	4%
NMB Research	October 6–7, 2010	42%	44%	-

==== Predictions ====
Source	Ranking	As of
The Cook Political Report	Lean D	November 1, 2010
Rothenberg	Tossup	November 1, 2010
Sabato's Crystal Ball	Lean D	November 1, 2010
RCP	Tossup	November 1, 2010
CQ Politics	Tossup	October 28, 2010
New York Times	Tossup	November 1, 2010
FiveThirtyEight	Tossup	November 1, 2010

Massachusetts's 10th congressional district election, 2010
Party	Candidate	Votes	%
Democratic	William R. Keating	132,582	46.9
Republican	Jeff Perry	119,820	42.4
Independent	Maryanne Lewis	16,673	5.9
Independent	Jim Sheets	10,438	3.7
Bring Home Troops	Joe Van Nes	3,075	1.1
Total votes		282,588	100
Turnout			

== Campaign financing ==
District 1

Fundraising totals for Olver and Gunn are as of October 13, 2010. Totals for Engel are as of September 30. Source: Federal Election Commission

Candidate (party)	Receipts	Disbursements	Cash on hand	Debt
John Olver (D)	$819,402	$842,892	$79,980	$0
Bill Gunn (R)	$39,731	$24,203	$15,528	$0
Michael Engel (I)	$18,295	$3,640	$14,654	$0

District 2

As of October 13, 2010. Source: Federal Election Commission

Candidate (party)	Receipts	Disbursements	Cash on hand	Debt
Richard Neal (D)	$2,131,010	$1,937,756	$2,400,446	$0
Tom Wesley (R)	$123,203	$86,455	$1,660	$0

District 3

As of October 13, 2010. Source: Federal Election Commission

Candidate (party)	Receipts	Disbursements	Cash on hand	Debt
Jim McGovern (D)	$1,591,426	$1,570,083	$353,622	$0
Marty Lamb (R)	$98,331	$60,089	$38,242	$27,200

District 4

As of October 13, 2010. Source: Federal Election Commission

Candidate (party)	Receipts	Disbursements	Cash on hand	Debt
Barney Frank (D)	$3,001,877	$2,525,757	$649,561	$0
Sean Bielat (R)	$1,297,433	$834,520	$462,914	$0

District 5

As of October 15, 2010. Source: Federal Election Commission

Candidate (party)	Receipts	Disbursements	Cash on hand	Debt
Niki Tsongas (D)	$1,703,083	$1,197,751	$520,827	$27,100
Jon Golnik (R)	$300,652	$232,044	$68,608	$105,000
Dale Brown (I)	$3,459	$3,515	$-57	$1,500

District 6

As of October 13, 2010. Source: Federal Election Commission

Candidate (party)	Receipts	Disbursements	Cash on hand	Debt
John F. Tierney (D)	$766,196	$611,356	$1,437,451	$0
Bill Hudak (R)	$723,614	$628,743	$94,871	$19,923

District 7

Totals for Markey are as of October 13; totals for Dembrowski are as of October September 30. Source: Federal Election Commission

Candidate (party)	Receipts	Disbursements	Cash on hand	Debt
Edward J. Markey (D)	$1,424,700	$951,075	$3,299,910	$0
Gerry Dembrowski (R)	$22,455	$18,723	$3,732	$0

District 8

As of October 13, 2010. Source: Federal Election Commission

Candidate (party)	Receipts	Disbursements	Cash on hand	Debt
Mike Capuano (D)	$822,047	$1,894,452	$91,474	$48,250
Frederick Golder (R)	$0	$0	$0	$0

District 9

As of October 13, 2010. Source: Federal Election Commission

Candidate (party)	Receipts	Disbursements	Cash on hand	Debt
Stephen Lynch (D)	$844,965	$1,391,385	$755,272	$0
Vernon McKinley Harrison (R)	$5,305	$6,383	$-1,078	$2,207

District 10

As of October 13, 2010. Source: Federal Election Commission

Candidate (party)	Receipts	Disbursements	Cash on hand	Debt
William R. Keating (D)	$1,169,722	$945,441	$224,281	$420
Jeff Perry (R)	$948,634	$714,930	$233,703	$0
Maryanne Lewis (I)	$59,914	$50,516	$9,398	$0
Jim Sheets (I)	$47,940	$34,437	$13,502	$0

Preceded by 2008 elections	United States House of Representatives elections in Massachusetts; 2010	Succeeded by 2012 elections
