= John F. Tierney =

American politician (born 1951)

John Tierney
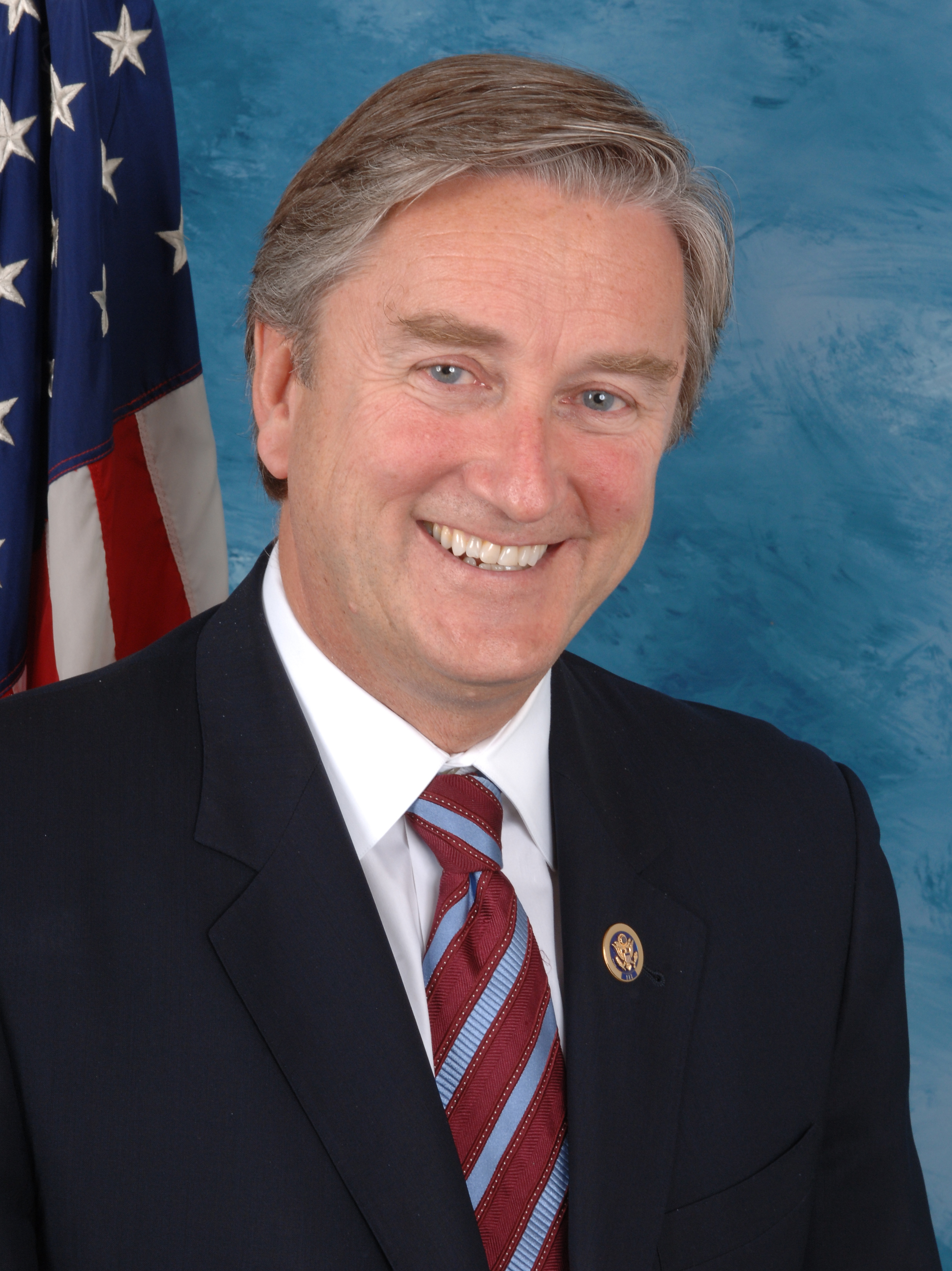
- Official portrait, 2009

Member of the U.S. House of Representatives from Massachusetts's 6th district
- In office January 3, 1997 – January 3, 2015
- Preceded by: Peter G. Torkildsen
- Succeeded by: Seth Moulton

Personal details
- Born: September 18, 1951 (age 74) Salem, Massachusetts, U.S.
- Party: Democratic
- Spouse: Patrice Eremian (m. 1997)
- Education: Salem State College (BA); Suffolk University (JD)
- Occupation: Attorney

John F. Tierney (born September 18, 1951) is an American politician who served as a U.S. Representative from Massachusetts from 1997 to 2015. He is a Democrat who represented the state's 6th district, which includes the state's North Shore and Cape Ann.

Born and raised in Salem, Massachusetts, Tierney graduated from Salem State College and Suffolk University Law School. He worked in private law and served on the Salem Chamber of Commerce from 1976 to 1997. Tierney first ran for the House of Representatives in 1994 against Republican incumbent Peter G. Torkildsen, losing by a small margin. He defeated Torkildsen in a rematch in 1996.

A liberal member of Congress, Tierney voted along with other Democratic Representatives from Massachusetts. He sat on the House Committee on Education and Labor, where his priorities included green energy and increased college access. He co-authored several pieces of legislation, including the Green Jobs Act of 2007 and the College Affordability and Accountability Act of 2008. He is the former chairman of the Subcommittee on National Security and Foreign Affairs, where he helped establish the Commission on Wartime Contracting in Iraq and Afghanistan. From 1998 to 2010, Tierney comfortably won re-election in each cycle. He faced tougher challenges after his wife Patrice was convicted of felony tax fraud in 2010, narrowly defeating his Republican opponent in 2012. In the 2014 election, he lost the Democratic primary to Seth Moulton, who went on to hold the seat in the general election. In February 2016, Tierney was appointed the executive director of the Council for a Livable World and the Center for Arms Control and Non-Proliferation, the council's affiliated education and research organization.

== Early life, education, and career ==
John F. Tierney was born September 18, 1951, in Salem, Massachusetts. His mother, Doris H. (née Gelineau) Tierney, was a Salem native who worked a split shift at the New England Telephone Company, where she remained for 42 years. His father, Albert R. Tierney, was a bookkeeper for Nabisco and a local fuel company. Tierney was one of three children, along with his brother Michael A. and sister Catherine. His father was of Irish descent and his mother was of half French-Canadian and half Irish ancestry. He moved with his family to his grandmother's home when he was five years old. He began working at the Kernwood Country Club in Salem as a caddie when he was 8 and soon adopted a paper route. He later attended Salem High School. When he was young, Tierney campaigned for his uncle, a Peabody ward councilor, and he ascribes his political interest in part to this experience.

Tierney attended Salem State College, majoring in political science. While in college he performed work study, while also stocking shelves at a grocery store, working in sales at a clothing store, and performing deliveries. For three years he was president of his class, and in his final year he served as President of the Salem State Student Government Association (SGA). As SGA president Tierney responded to racial incidents on campus by organizing a school-wide meeting leading to several days of discussion. He graduated in 1973, and returned in 2009 to give a commencement address, receiving an honorary degree.

While working as a law office clerk and a State House janitor, Tierney attended Suffolk University Law School. Tierney graduated with a Juris Doctor in 1976, and was admitted to the Massachusetts bar. Tierney worked as a solo practitioner until 1981, when he became a partner at the North Shore community law firm Tierney, Kalis, & Lucas. Tierney remained at the firm until taking office in 1997. Tierney served on the Salem Chamber of Commerce from 1976 to 1997, becoming the organization's president in 1995.

== U.S. House of Representatives ==
=== Elections ===
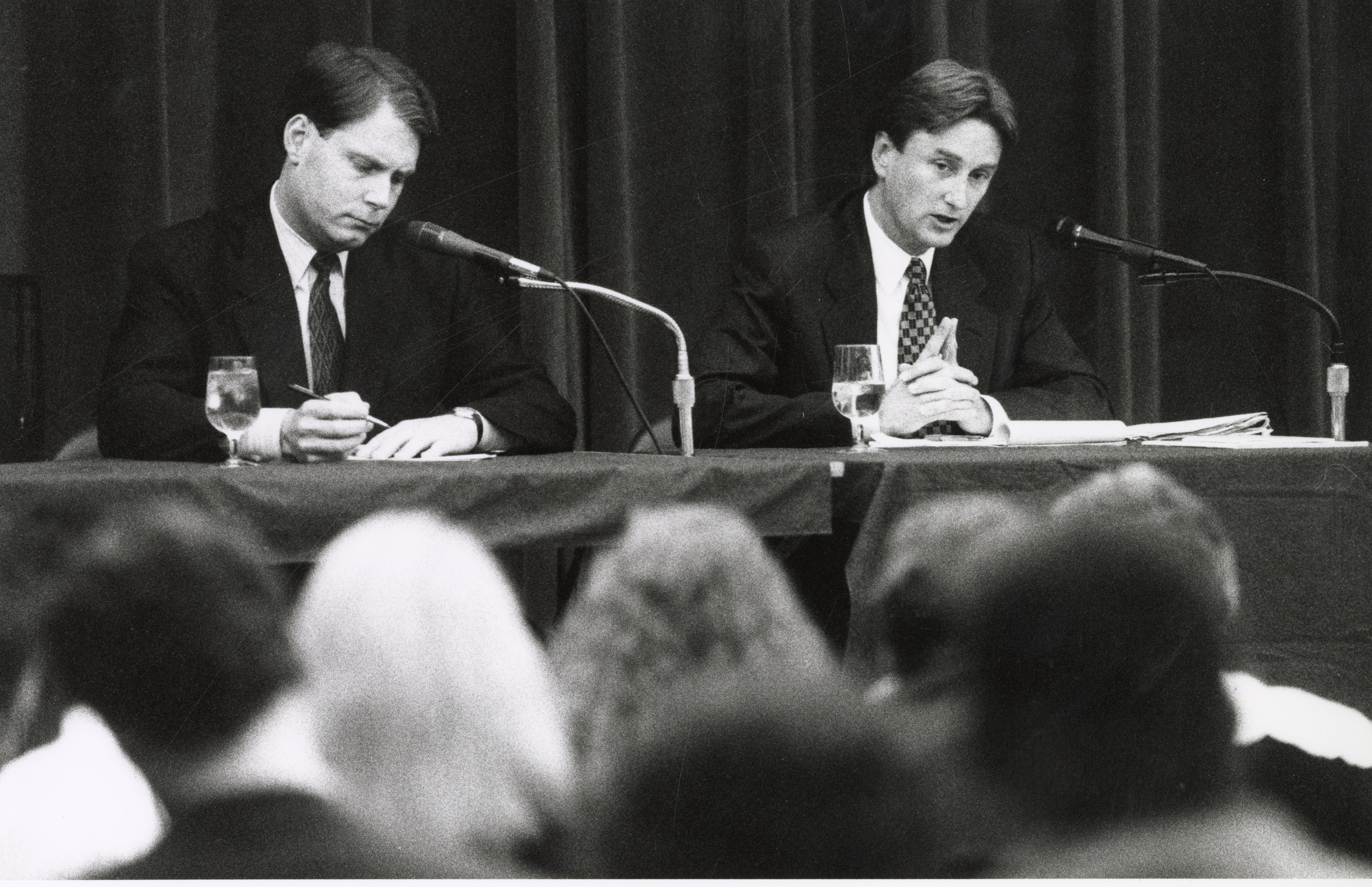
Tierney (right) debating Peter Torkildsen during their 1994 congressional election

Tierney first ran for Congress in 1994 against one-term Republican incumbent Peter G. Torkildsen, having won a competitive Democratic primary with a plurality of 33.8 percent. He ran on a platform promoting a stronger federal focus on drug abuse, federal aid to promote after-school programs, consideration of means testing for Social Security, and single-payer health care. A primary issue in the campaign was crime: Tierney criticized Torkildsen for his vote against a 1994 crime bill, and advocated stronger gun control, while Torkildsen criticized Tierney's positions on gun control and drug legalization. Tierney was defeated in the general election by 4%. Tierney successfully ran for Congress in 1996, defeating Torkildsen by a narrow margin and increasing his margin in a 1998 rematch. Over the next five elections, Tierney won with over 68% of the vote. In 2010, he faced a stronger challenge from Republican candidate Bill Hudak, after his wife Patrice was convicted of felony tax fraud; he won with 57% of the vote.

In his 2012 race for re-election, Tierney faced former State Senator and 2010 nominee for Lieutenant Governor Richard Tisei. Tisei, who is openly gay, was endorsed by the Log Cabin Republicans. He was also endorsed by The Rainbow Times, a Boston-based LGBT newspaper. Gay Democratic Congressman Barney Frank endorsed Tierney, likening gay Republicans to Uncle Tom. Tierney narrowly won re-election on November 6, 2012, with 48% of the vote to Tisei's 47%.

Tierney ran for re-election against four challengers for the Democratic nomination in 2014. With 27 percent of precincts reporting, Tierney trailed Seth Moulton 51 percent to 40 percent and conceded.

=== Tenure ===
Committee assignments
113th Congress (2013–15)
- Education and the Workforce
  - Higher Education and Workforce Training
  - Employment, Labor, and Pensions
- Oversight and Government Reform
  - National Security, Homeland Defense and Foreign Operations (Ranking member)

Tierney, described as "an unwavering liberal" by CQ's Politics in America, has consistently high approval ratings from Democratic and liberal interest groups such as Americans for Democratic Action, and low approval ratings from conservative groups such as the American Conservative Union. His votes have been closely aligned with the other Democratic representatives from his state. Described as "a favorite of the House Democratic leadership," he maintains a close relationship with former House Speaker Nancy Pelosi; her daughter Christine Pelosi served as his chief of staff from 2001 to 2005. Tierney was speculated as a candidate to succeed United States Senator Ted Kennedy in a special election after Kennedy's death in 2009, but he decided not to run. In 2010 Washington paper The Hill published a speculation that Tierney, with a $1.3 million war chest, was a likely candidate to run against Kennedy's successor Scott Brown in the 2012 election. Tierney later stated that he would not contest the Senate seat and would instead seek a ninth term as Congressman.

==== Domestic policy ====
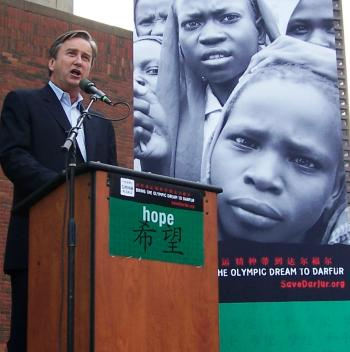
Congressman John Tierney speaks at an Olympic Dream for Darfur torch relay event in Boston, Massachusetts, in October 2007.

Tierney and Rep. Hilda Solis coauthored the Green Jobs Act of 2007, which allocated $125 million to green jobs training. The bill was incorporated into the Energy Independence and Security Act of 2007 and signed into law. Tierney was initially opposed to the Troubled Asset Relief Program proposal of 2008, although he ultimately voted for the bill, saying, "The state of panic in the markets compels Congress to act."

The House included several of his proposals in the Higher Education Opportunity Act of 2008, one which prevented states from cutting education funding as federal aid increased, and one which forgave federal loans for students who went into some public service professions. Throughout his career, Tierney has repeatedly introduced a bill called "Clean Money, Clean Elections", which would create a national, publicly financed clean elections system. With little support in Congress, the proposal has been unsuccessful.

Tierney is a supporter of universal health care. In early 2010, Tierney came under fire from some in his district for his support of the Patient Protection and Affordable Care Act.

On March 6, 2013 Tierney and several House Democrats walked out on a Committee on Education and the Workforce vote, accusing Republican counterparts on the committee of not negotiating "in a bipartisan manner." Tierney has introduced a version of Elizabeth Warren's "Bank on Student Loans Fairness Act" into the House, which would reduce federally subsidized education loans to 0.75%, the rate paid by banks.

A February 2012 Washington Post report revealed that 33 members of Congress helped direct more than $300 million in earmarks to public projects in close proximity to commercial and residential real estate owned by the lawmakers or their family members. According to the investigation, Tierney has helped direct about $3.5 million toward a 950-space parking garage and commuter rail station in Salem, Mass. The facility will be located roughly 1/4 mile from a commercial building Tierney co-owns.

==== Foreign policy ====
Tierney was a member of the House Committee on Oversight and Government Reform and chairman of the Subcommittee on National Security and Foreign Affairs during the 110th and 111th Congresses. Tierney introduced the 2007 House legislation that created the Commission on Wartime Contracting in Iraq and Afghanistan to study government contracting related to the Afghanistan War and the Iraq War. The same year Tierney chaired a congressional hearing over conditions at Walter Reed Army Medical Center. The center had been criticized in the press for its dilapidated conditions and inadequate care, as well as for prioritizing a "VIP ward" for non-soldiers. The House approved Tierney's amendment to direct $75,000,000 to secular school construction in Pakistan to compete against Islamic madrassas.

Tierney is a critic of U.S. investment in missile defense, and has called for large budget cuts to the Missile Defense Agency. He introduced an amendment to redirect $966 million in funding from missile defense systems to other military initiatives. The proposal, opposed by Armed Services Committee leaders as "going too far", was rejected in a House vote.

== Personal life ==
Tierney dated Patrice M. (Eremian) Chew of Marblehead throughout his 1996 campaign. They married in a small ceremony in April 1997 and now live in Salem, where Patrice works as a jewelry designer. Tierney has three stepchildren from his wife's first marriage.

=== Wife's tax fraud conviction ===
In August 2010, Tierney's wife Patrice's brothers Robert and Daniel Eremian were indicted in federal court for operating an illegal internet gambling business. Robert had allegedly, with Daniel's help, operated the business out of St. John's, Antigua and Barbuda, and funneled a portion of the profits into a Bank of America account in Massachusetts. In October 2010, Patrice was charged in U.S. District Court with four counts of "aiding and abetting the filing of false tax returns" by Robert. John Tierney issued a statement announcing his wife's intention to plead guilty, stating that Patrice accepted "full responsibility for being 'willfully blind' to what her brother was doing." Patrice pleaded guilty on October 6, 2010, and on January 13, 2011, was sentenced to 30 days in prison followed by five months of house arrest. The conviction bolstered the campaign of Bill Hudak, Tierney's Republican opponent in the November 2010 election, but Tierney was re-elected. In June 2012, a federal judge ordered Daniel Eremian to forfeit $7.7 million in assets for his role in the illegal offshore sports betting scheme. Following his sentencing, Daniel Eremian told reporters that the congressman "knew everything that was going on", a charge which Tierney rebutted.

== Electoral history ==
U.S. House, 6th District of Massachusetts (General Election)
Year	Winning candidate	Party	Pct	Opponent	Party	Pct	Opponent	Party	Pct	
1994	Peter G. Torkildsen (inc.)	Republican	50.5%	John F. Tierney	Democratic	47.4%	Benjamin A. Gatchell	Independent	2.1%	
1996	John F. Tierney	Democratic	49.3%	Peter G. Torkildsen (inc.)	Republican	49.2%	Martin J. McNulty	Independent	1.6%	
1998	John F. Tierney (inc.)	Democratic	54.6%	Peter G. Torkildsen	Republican	42.4%	Randal C. Fritz	Independent	3.0%	
2000	John F. Tierney (inc.)	Democratic	71.1%	Paul McCarthy	Republican	28.9%				
2002	John F. Tierney (inc.)	Democratic	68.3%	Mark C. Smith	Republican	31.7%				
2004	John F. Tierney (inc.)	Democratic	70.0%	Stephen P. O'Malley, Jr.	Republican	30.0%				
2006	John F. Tierney (inc.)	Democratic	69.7%	Richard W. Barton	Republican	30.3%				
2008	John F. Tierney (inc.)	Democratic	70.5%	Richard A. Baker	Republican	29.5%				
2010	John F. Tierney (inc.)	Democratic	56.9%	Bill Hudak	Republican	43.1%				
2012	John F. Tierney (inc.)	Democratic	48.2%	Richard Tisei	Republican	47.2%	Daniel Fishman	Libertarian	4.6%	
U.S. House, 6th District of Massachusetts (Democratic Primary)
Year	Candidate	Result	Opponent	Result	Opponent	Pct	Opponent	Pct	Opponent	Pct
2014	Seth Moulton	50.8%	John F. Tierney	40.1%	Marisa DeFranco	6.1%	John Devine	2.1%	John Gutta	1.0%

U.S. House of Representatives
Preceded by Peter G. Torkildsen	Member of the U.S. House of Representatives from Massachusetts's 6th congressional district January 3, 1997 – January 3, 2015	Succeeded by Seth Moulton
U.S. order of precedence (ceremonial)
Preceded by John Linder as Former US Representative	Order of precedence of the United States as Former US Representative	Succeeded by Wayne Gilchrest as Former US Representative
