= Richard Tisei =

American politician (born 1962)

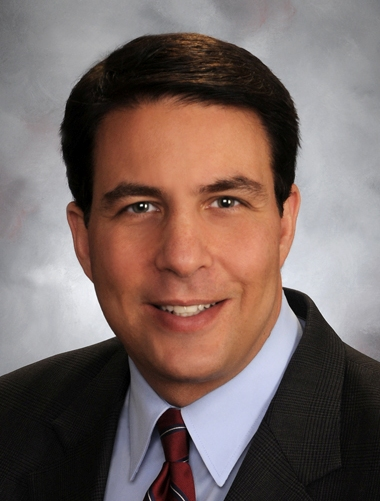

Minority Leader of the Massachusetts Senate
- In office January 3, 2007 – January 3, 2011
- Preceded by: Brian Lees
- Succeeded by: Bruce Tarr

Member of the Massachusetts Senate
- In office January 3, 1991 – January 3, 2011
- Preceded by: John A. Brennan, Jr.
- Succeeded by: Katherine Clark
- Constituency: 3rd Middlesex (1991–2003); Middlesex and Essex (2003–2011)

Member of the Massachusetts House of Representatives from the 22nd Middlesex district
- In office January 3, 1985 – January 3, 1991
- Preceded by: Alfred Minahan
- Succeeded by: William F. Cass

Personal details
- Born: August 13, 1962 (age 64) Somerville, Massachusetts, U.S.
- Party: Republican
- Spouse: Bernie Starr (m. 2013)
- Education: American University (BA)
- Website: Campaign website

Richard R. Tisei (/tɪˈseɪ/; born August 13, 1962) is an American politician from Massachusetts. A Republican, he served in both chambers of the Massachusetts General Court for a combined 26 years, eventually becoming Minority Leader in the Massachusetts Senate. He was the Republican nominee for Lieutenant Governor of Massachusetts in 2010 and the nominee for Congress from Massachusetts's 6th district in 2012 and 2014.

A graduate of American University, Tisei was elected to the Massachusetts House of Representatives in 1984. At 22, he was the youngest Republican ever elected to the Massachusetts General Court. Tisei served in the House until 1990, when he was elected to the Massachusetts Senate. He was elected Assistant Minority Leader in 1997 and Minority Leader in January 2007. He did not run for re-election in 2010, instead running for Lieutenant Governor alongside Republican gubernatorial nominee Charlie Baker. The two lost to Democratic incumbents Deval Patrick and Tim Murray by 6.41%.

Tisei ran for the United States House of Representatives in 2012, narrowly losing to seven-term Democratic incumbent John F. Tierney by 1.2%. He ran again in 2014 and faced former U.S. Marine Seth Moulton in the general election after Moulton defeated Tierney in the Democratic primary. Tisei was defeated again, this time by almost 14%.

== Early life, education, and early career ==
Tisei was born in Somerville, Massachusetts. Tisei's grandparents were immigrants from Tivoli, Italy. The son of a builder, he graduated from Lynnfield High School in Lynnfield, Massachusetts in 1981.

Tisei received his B.A. from American University in 1984. A high school visit to the Massachusetts State House gave Tisei "the political bug." In 1982, Tisei was an intern at the White House at the domestic office of Vice President George H. W. Bush. Later, Tisei interned at the office of Massachusetts House Minority Leader William G. Robinson.

== Massachusetts House of Representatives (1985–1991) ==
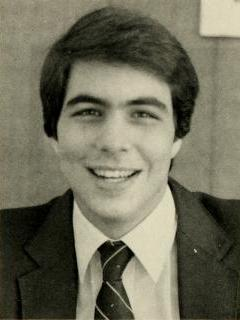
Tisei as a State Representative in 1985

In 1984, Tisei ran for the open 22nd Middlesex district seat of the Massachusetts House of Representatives. Running as a Republican, Tisei defeated Democratic candidate Donald Flanagan, of Wakefield 11,189 to 8,263 and took office the following year. Tisei was the youngest Republican ever elected to the Massachusetts House. He won re-election in 1986 and 1988 with 77% of the vote.

In 1990, he voted against Republican Minority Leader Steven Pierce's budget.

== Massachusetts Senate (1991–2011) ==
The district included Lynnfield, Malden, Melrose, Reading, Stoneham, and Wakefield.

=== Elections ===
In 1990, incumbent Democratic State Senator John A. Brennan decided to retire. Tisei decided to retire his seat in the lower chamber to run for that open senate seat. He defeated Democrat Mike Festa and Independent Paul Maisano 54%–37%–9%. He won re-election unopposed in 1992, 1994, 1996, 1998, 2002, 2006, and 2008. In 2000, he defeated Democrat Steve Spain 73%–27%. In 2004, he defeated Katherine Clark 57%–43%. In 2010, he decided to retire in order to run statewide. Clark ran again and won the seat.

=== Tenure ===
As a member of the State Senate, Tisei served for many years as a member of the Joint Committee on Human Services and Elder Affairs. He was named legislator of the Year by the Massachusetts Alliance for the Mentally Ill, The Human Service Providers of Massachusetts and the Home Health Care Association Of Massachusetts. Tisei had a 100% rating from MASS NARAL and Planned Parenthood of Massachusetts. He was also a supporter of same-sex marriage.

Tisei is known best for sponsoring the 1993 Welfare Reform Law and the Whistleblower Protection Law. He also sponsored legislation that would limit the amount of campaign funds candidates can rollover from year to year.

He is a fiscal conservative and strongly supported a sales tax holiday.

In a Washington Post article, he described himself as "a live-and-let-live Republican. My philosophy is, the government should get off your back, out of your wallet and away from the bedroom."

=== Committee assignments ===
- Bills in the Third Reading
- Elder Affairs
- Election Laws
- Mental Health and Substance Abuse
- Municipalities and Regional Government
- State Administration and Regulatory Oversight
- Steering and Policy
- Tourism, Arts and Cultural Development
- Ways and Means
- Redistricting

== Campaigns for higher office ==
In 1995, U.S. Senator Arlen Specter (R-PA) encouraged Tisei to run against Democratic U.S. Congressman Ed Markey of Massachusetts's 7th congressional district. He decided not to challenge him in 1996.

=== 2010 statewide election ===
On July 28, 2009, Tisei was named the campaign chair for Charlie Baker's 2010 gubernatorial run. On November 23, 2009, Baker named Tisei as his running mate, and thus as a candidate for lieutenant governor.

Just prior to the announcement of Tisei as Baker's running mate, Tisei publicly disclosed that he is gay for the first time in an interview with the Boston Globe. Baker and Tisei, unopposed in the Republican primary, were defeated in the general election.

The Patrick/Murray ticket defeated Baker/Tisei 48%–42%.

=== 2012 congressional election ===
In November 2011, Tisei announced his plans to challenge eight-term U.S. Congressman John F. Tierney (D-MA 6th). The newly redrawn Massachusetts's 6th congressional district remained largely the same, but added Billerica, Tewksbury, and Andover. This was a swing district where Scott Brown got 58% of the vote in January 2010 and where Baker/Tisei got 50% in the November 2010 gubernatorial election. Tierney barely came out on top over Tisei, by 3,500 votes out of 374,244 cast. The race was the closest in New England.

Tisei’s campaign made a number of payments for a political consultant, campaign aides, a fundraiser, and a digital marketing firm in 2011 from a state campaign fund. David Scharfenberg of The Boston Globe speculated that the payments were to support his campaign for Congress. The Tisei campaign has noted that the payments were all made prior to his official declaration of candidacy for Congress and that they were for activities in support of a potential run for state-level office.

=== 2014 congressional election ===
Tisei ran against Democratic nominee Seth Moulton in 2014. It was widely thought that he would face incumbent Congressman John F. Tierney in a rematch from the 2012 race. But on September 9, Tierney became the fourth member of the U.S. House of Representatives to lose a primary election in the 2014 cycle. Roll Call previously called the race between Tierney and Tisei a "Toss up", but did not re-evaluate the race after the primary upset. Tisei was notably endorsed by Marisa DeFranco, a Democrat who unsuccessfully ran for United States Senate in the 2012 election.

Tisei boycotted the Republican state convention because of the "socially conservative platform the party adopted." But the National Republican Congressional Committee has given him "On the Radar" status, meaning that the NRCC "will help to provide candidates and their campaigns the tools they need to run successful, winning campaigns."

He was endorsed by the Gay and Lesbian Victory Fund but was soundly beaten by Moulton in the general election, by 149,638 votes (54.97%) to 111,989 (41.13%).

== Political views ==
Tisei has stated about his political ideology: "I have a pretty independent voting record. I try not to be an ideologue. I look at every issue that comes up individually..." The Martha's Vineyard Times reported that Tisei "sees himself as a traditional Republican, believing in individualism, limited government involvement in people's personal lives, and an emphasis on the role of the individual" and as "a libertarian on social issues."

== Personal life ==
In July 2013 Tisei and his longtime partner Bernie Starr were married. They reside in Wakefield. They also own a home at the Katama neighborhood of Edgartown, Massachusetts, at Martha's Vineyard. Since 1992, Tisei has been a real estate broker with Northrup Associate Realtors. In 2000, Tisei became co-owner of Northrup with Starr.

Massachusetts Senate
Preceded by Brian Lees	Minority Leader of the Massachusetts Senate; 2007–2011	Succeeded by Bruce Tarr
Party political offices
Preceded by Reed V. Hillman	Republican nominee for Lieutenant Governor of Massachusetts; 2010	Succeeded by Karyn Polito
