= Niki Tsongas =

American politician (born 1946)

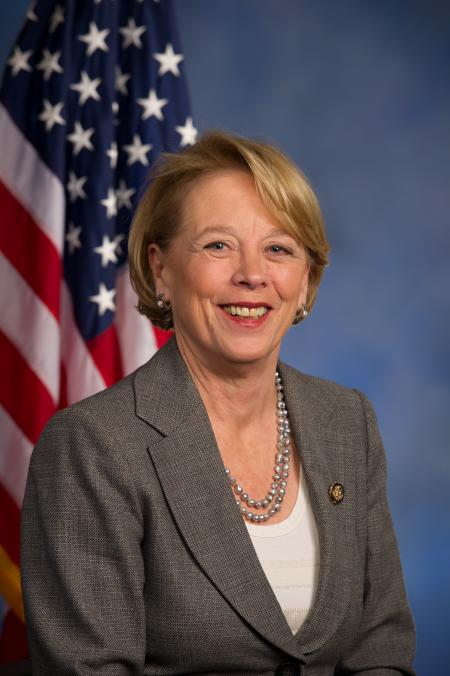
- Official portrait, 2012

Member of the U.S. House of Representatives from Massachusetts
- In office October 16, 2007 – January 3, 2019 (Note: Tsongas's official service begins on the date of the special election, while she was not sworn in until October 18, 2007.)
- Preceded by: Marty Meehan
- Succeeded by: Lori Trahan
- Constituency: 5th district (2007–2013); 3rd district (2013–2019)

Personal details
- Born: Nicola Dickson Sauvage; April 26, 1946 (age 80) Chico, California, U.S.
- Party: Democratic
- Spouse: Paul Tsongas (m. 1969; died 1997)
- Children: 3
- Education: Smith College (BA); Boston University (JD)
- Website: House website (archived)

Nicola Dickson "Niki" Tsongas (/ˈsɒŋɡəs/; née Sauvage; born April 26, 1946) is an American politician who served as a U.S. representative from Massachusetts from 2007 to 2019. She held the seat formerly held by her husband, the late Paul Tsongas, for the district numbered as Massachusetts's 5th congressional district from 2007 to 2013 and as Massachusetts's 3rd congressional district from 2013 to 2019. She is a member of the Democratic Party. In August 2017 Tsongas announced that she would not seek another term in the November 2018 election.

== Early life and education ==
Tsongas was born Nicola Dickson Sauvage on April 26, 1946, in Chico, California. Her mother, Marian Susan (née Wyman), was an artist and copywriter, and her father, Colonel Russell Elmer Sauvage, was an engineer in the United States Army Air Forces who survived the attack on Pearl Harbor. Tsongas graduated in 1964 from Narimasu American High School in Japan while her father was stationed at Fuchu Air Force Base. She spent one year at Michigan State University, then transferred to Smith College in Northampton, Massachusetts, graduating in 1968 with a Bachelor of Arts in religion. After college she moved to New York City, where she took a job as a social worker for the Department of Welfare. Tsongas earned her Juris Doctor from Boston University and started Lowell's first all-female law practice. She is an Episcopalian.

== Early career ==
Tsongas interned in Arlington, Virginia, for presidential candidate Eugene McCarthy during summer 1967; at a party there she met Paul Tsongas, then an aide to Republican Congressman Brad Morse. In 1969, she married Paul; they had three daughters: Ashley, Katina, and Molly. Paul served in the House from Massachusetts's 5th congressional district from 1975 to 1979, and the Senate from 1979 to 1985. After being diagnosed with non-Hodgkin lymphoma, he declined to seek a second term in the Senate; he resigned the day before his term expired. The Tsongases moved from Washington, D.C., back to Massachusetts for Paul to undergo treatments. After seemingly being cured of his disease, in 1992 Paul ran for the Democratic nomination for president; he came in third behind former California Governor Jerry Brown and eventual winner Bill Clinton. Paul's cancer later returned; he died of pneumonia and liver failure on January 18, 1997.

Before her election to the House, Tsongas worked as the dean of external affairs at Middlesex Community College, as a board member of Fallon Health and on the Lowell Civic Stadium and Arena Commission, which oversees several sites, including the Tsongas Arena. In 2001, Representative Marty Meehan appointed Tsongas to head a foundation to provide education funding for children of the victims of the September 11 attacks.

== U.S. House of Representatives ==
=== Elections ===
After Marty Meehan resigned in 2007 to serve as chancellor of the University of Massachusetts Lowell, Tsongas ran in the special election. She defeated four other candidates to win the Democratic primary with 36% of the vote. During her initial campaign Tsongas received endorsements from The Boston Globe, the Boston Herald, and the Lowell Sun. During the general election, former President Bill Clinton, who defeated her husband for the Democratic nomination in 1992, campaigned for her. At an event in Lowell Massachusetts, Clinton remarked: "Congress will be a better place because she is there." Tsongas won the special election against Republican Jim Ogonowski with 51% of the vote on October 17; she became the only female representative from Massachusetts, and the first from that state since the 1983 retirement of Margaret Heckler, who became Secretary of Health and Human Services under Ronald Reagan.

After running unopposed in 2008, in 2010 Tsongas faced Republican Jon Golnik, a small businessman and former Wall Street currency trader. During the campaign Tsongas attacked Golnik's history as a Vice President of AIG, which Golnik called hypocritical as she owned stock in AIG and other large corporations. Tsongas defeated Golnik with 52% of the vote. Following redistricting after the 2010 census, Tsongas ran for reelection in the reconfigured Massachusetts's 3rd congressional district in 2012. In a rematch, she again defeated Golnik.

=== Tenure ===
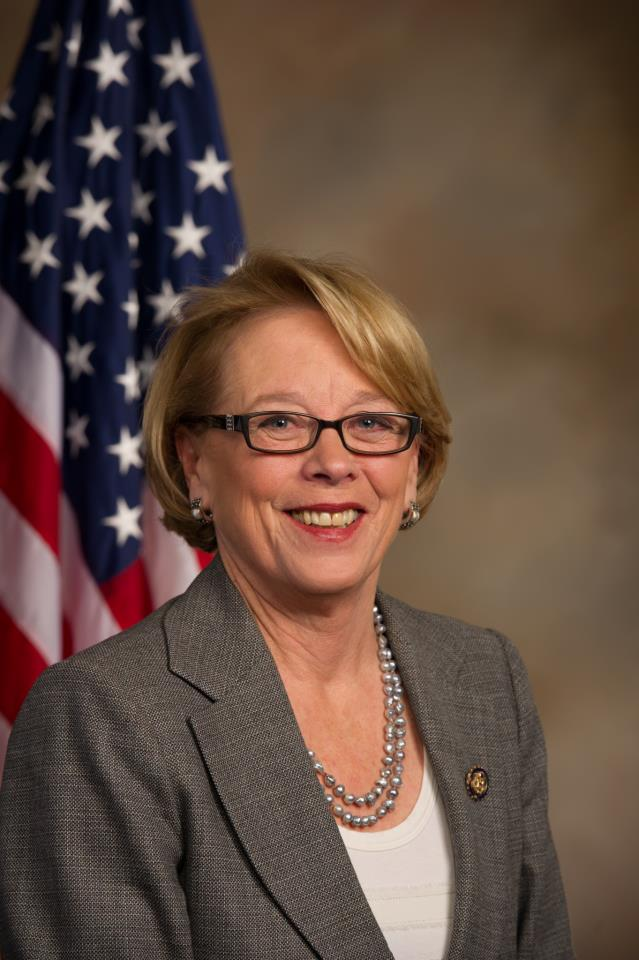
Tsongas' official 5th District portrait

Committee assignments
114th Congress (2015–2017)
- Armed Services
  - Military Personnel
  - Tactical Air and Land Forces
- Natural Resources
  - Energy and Mineral Resources
  - Federal Lands

A major issue in her initial election was whether the two candidates would vote to override President George W. Bush's veto of an expansion of the State Children's Health Insurance Program. Tsongas said she would, and it was reported that Ogonowski would not. Hours after being sworn into office on October 18, Tsongas voted to override, but the vote failed to achieve the necessary two-thirds majority.

As a candidate in 2007, Tsongas promised to withdraw troops and end the Iraq War. The first bill she introduced aimed to do this by implementing a timetable for withdrawal from Iraq. In 2010, along with other women in Congress, including House Speaker Nancy Pelosi, Tsongas visited Afghanistan to oversee the war effort. Upon returning, she spoke of the need for the involvement of women in rebuilding of government.

Tsongas is an advocate for universal health care and supports a public health insurance option. In 2010 she voted for the Patient Protection and Affordable Care Act and Health Care and Education Reconciliation Act. In 2012 Tsongas joined a Republican-led effort to repeal a 2.3% sales tax on medical-device manufacturers, which passed the House 270–146; 36 other Democrats voted for it. Tsongas is pro-choice and received a 100% approval rating from Planned Parenthood in 2008. A supporter of LGBT rights, she cosponsored the Respect for Marriage Act to repeal the Defense of Marriage Act; and voted for the Don't Ask, Don't Tell Repeal Act of 2010, which allows gays and lesbians to serve openly in the United States Armed Forces.

Following Anthony Weiner's first sexting scandal, Tsongas was the only Representative from Massachusetts to call for his resignation, saying, "it would be appropriate for [him] to step down." In the 2012 Massachusetts Senate election Tsongas was the first major Democratic politician to endorse Elizabeth Warren, whom she called "a fighter for middle-class families". After President Barack Obama appointed John Kerry as United States Secretary of State, there was much speculation that Tsongas would run in the special election for his seat, which her husband had also previously held. She briefly considered a run, but decided she would best be able to serve the people of Massachusetts by staying in the House, and endorsed fellow Representative Ed Markey.

In January 2013 Tsongas introduced the Nashua River Wild and Scenic River Study Act (H.R. 412; 113th Congress), a bill that would amend the Wild and Scenic Rivers Act to designate certain segments of the Nashua River in Massachusetts for study for potential addition to the National Wild and Scenic Rivers System. Tsongas discussed the river's history and past pollution problems in her testimony about the bill. She argued that the study would allow stakeholders to work together to "ensure that it remains a great place for canoeing, fishing, and enjoying the outdoors."

Tsongas was a member of the Congressional Arts Caucus and the U.S.-Japan Caucus.

== Legacy ==
Opened in 2022, the 87-foot Niki Tsongas bridge in Lowell was named after her.

== Electoral history ==
2007 Special election, 2007
Party	Candidate	Votes	%	±%
Democratic	Niki Tsongas	54,363	51.32	−47.66
Republican	Jim Ogonowski	47,770	45.10	+45.10
Independent	Patrick Murphy	2,170	2.05	+2.05
Independent	Kurt Hayes	1,125	1.06	+1.06
Constitution	Kevin Thompson	494	0.47	+0.47
Turnout		105,922		
Democratic hold		Swing	-47.66	

2008 election
Party	Candidate	Votes	%	±%
Democratic	Niki Tsongas (incumbent)	225,947	98.71	+37.39
N/A	Write-in	2,960	1.29	−2.29
Turnout		302,397		
Democratic hold		Swing	+37.39	

2010 election
Party	Candidate	Votes	%	±%
Democratic	Niki Tsongas (incumbent)	122,858	54.84	−43.87
Republican	Jonathan A. Golnik	94,646	42.25	+42.25
Independent	Dale E. Brown	4,387	1.96	+1.96
Independent	Robert M. Clark	1,991	0.89	+0.89
All Others		147	0.07	−1.22
Turnout		229,647		
Democratic hold		Swing	-43.87	

2012 Democratic primary results
Party	Candidate	Votes	%
Democratic	Nicola Tsongas (incumbent)	24,105	99.2
Democratic	Write-ins	196	0.8
Total votes		24,301	100.0

Massachusetts's 3rd congressional district, 2014
Party	Candidate	Votes	%
Democratic	Niki Tsongas (incumbent)	139,104	60.3
Republican	Ann Wofford	81,638	35.4
n/a	Write-ins	204	0.1
Total votes		230,789	100.0
Democratic hold			

Massachusetts's 3rd congressional district, 2016
Party	Candidate	Votes	%
Democratic	Niki Tsongas (incumbent)	236,713	68.7
Republican	Ann Wofford	107,519	31.2
n/a	Write-ins	360	0.1
Total votes		344,592	100.0
Democratic hold			

== See also ==
- Women in the United States House of Representatives

U.S. House of Representatives
Preceded by Marty Meehan	Member of the U.S. House of Representatives from Massachusetts's 5th congressional district 2007–2013	Succeeded by Ed Markey
Preceded by Jim McGovern	Member of the U.S. House of Representatives from Massachusetts's 3rd congressional district 2013–2019	Succeeded by Lori Trahan
U.S. order of precedence (ceremonial)
Preceded by Joseph P. Kennedy II as Former U.S. Representative	Order of precedence of the United States as Former U.S. Representative	Succeeded by Bob Inglis as Former U.S. Representative
