= Dan Sullivan (U.S. senator) =

American politician and lawyer (born 1964)

Dan S. Sullivan
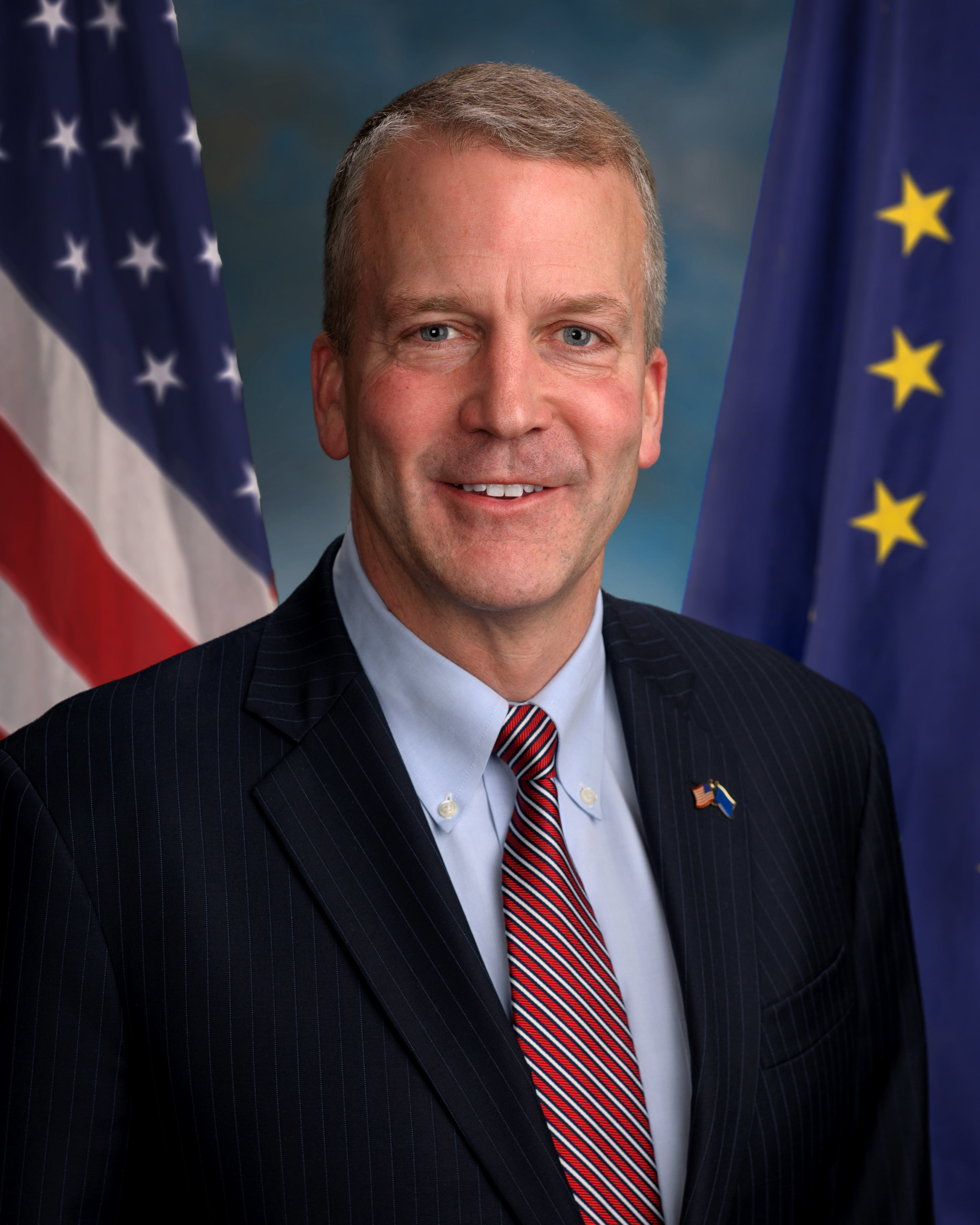
- Official portrait, 2015

United States Senator from Alaska
- Incumbent
- Assumed office January 3, 2015 Serving with Lisa Murkowski
- Preceded by: Mark Begich

Commissioner of the Alaska Department of Natural Resources
- In office December 6, 2010 – September 24, 2013
- Governor: Sean Parnell
- Preceded by: Thomas E. Irwin
- Succeeded by: Joseph Balash

27th Attorney General of Alaska
- In office June 17, 2009 – November 30, 2010
- Governor: Sarah Palin; Sean Parnell
- Preceded by: Talis J. Colberg
- Succeeded by: John J. Burns

22nd Assistant Secretary of State for Economic and Business Affairs
- In office June 6, 2006 – January 1, 2009
- President: George W. Bush
- Preceded by: Earl Anthony Wayne
- Succeeded by: Jose W. Fernandez

Personal details
- Born: Daniel Scott Sullivan; November 13, 1964 (age 62) Fairview Park, Ohio, U.S.
- Party: Republican
- Spouse: Julie Fate (m. 1994)
- Children: 3
- Relatives: Hugh Fate (father-in-law); Mary Jane Fate (mother-in-law)
- Education: Harvard University (BA); Georgetown University (MS, JD)
- Website: Senate website Campaign website

Military service
- Allegiance: United States
- Branch/service: United States Marine Corps; United States Marine Corps Reserve
- Years of service: 1993–1997, 2004–2006 (active); 1997–2004, 2006–2024 (reserve)
- Rank: Colonel
- Commands: 6th Air Naval Gunfire Liaison Company; 4th Marine Division's Anti-Terrorism Battalion
- Battles/wars: War in Afghanistan
- Awards: Legion of Merit; Defense Meritorious Service Medal
- Sullivan's voice Sullivan proposing an amendment for rail workers' contracts to avert a freight rail strike Recorded December 1, 2022

Daniel Scott Sullivan (born November 13, 1964) is an American politician, attorney, and Marine Corps veteran serving as the junior United States senator from Alaska, a seat he has held since 2015. A member of the Republican Party, he served from 2010 to 2013 as commissioner of the Alaska Department of Natural Resources and from 2009 to 2010 as attorney general of Alaska.

Sullivan grew up in a suburb of Cleveland, Ohio, and graduated from Culver Academies in Indiana. He studied economics at Harvard University, then earned joint foreign service and Juris Doctor degrees from Georgetown University. He was on active duty for the United States Marine Corps from 1993 to 1997, 2004 to 2006, and in 2009 and 2013.

Between 1997 and 1999, he clerked for judges on the United States Court of Appeals for the Ninth Circuit and the Alaska Supreme Court. He worked as an attorney in private practice in Anchorage, Alaska, from 2000 to 2002. In 2002, Sullivan joined the Bush administration; he worked with the National Economic Council and the National Security Council and later served as Assistant Secretary of State for Economic and Business Affairs.

Sullivan was first elected to the U.S. Senate in 2014, defeating Democratic incumbent Mark Begich after winning the Republican primary against Mead Treadwell and Joe Miller. He was reelected in 2020, and lost reelection to Democratic challenger Mary Peltola in 2026.

== Early life and education ==
Sullivan's 1983 high school portrait

Sullivan was born and raised in Fairview Park, Ohio, the son of Sandra (née Simmons) and Thomas C. Sullivan. Sullivan's father was the president and CEO of RPM International, a publicly traded multinational corporation with over 15,000 employees that was founded by Sullivan's grandfather, Frank C. Sullivan. Sullivan's brother, Frank C. Sullivan, became the president and CEO of RPM in 2002.

Sullivan graduated from the Culver Military Academy in Indiana in 1983. He studied economics at Harvard University, graduating in 1987 with a Bachelor of Arts degree magna cum laude. He went to Georgetown University, where he studied at both the Walsh School of Foreign Service and Georgetown University Law Center, receiving joint Juris Doctor and Master of Science in Foreign Service degrees in 1993. Sullivan was a member of the Georgetown Law Journal and earned a Juris Doctor degree with cum laude honors.

== Early career ==
=== Military service ===
Sullivan commissioned into the United States Marine Corps as an Infantry Officer in 1993 after completing graduate school. He was on active duty from 1993 to 1997, when he transitioned to the U.S. Marine Corps Reserve as a Recon Marine. He was recalled to active duty three times: from 2004 to 2006, again in early 2009, and for a six-week tour in Afghanistan in July 2013. Sullivan was a colonel in the Marine Corps Reserve. He received the Defense Meritorious Service Medal. In late 2023, Politico called Sullivan "the Senate's only serving military officer". Sullivan retired as a Marine in 2024.

=== Early legal career ===
After leaving active duty in the Marines, Sullivan served as a law clerk to Judge Andrew Kleinfeld of the U.S. Court of Appeals for the Ninth Circuit from 1997 to 1998 and to Chief Justice Warren Matthews of the Alaska Supreme Court from 1998 to 1999. In 2000, Sullivan joined the Anchorage office of the law firm Perkins Coie, where he worked in commercial law and corporate law. He joined the Alaska bar that same year.

=== White House and State Department ===
In 2002, Sullivan was selected to be a White House Fellow, where he served at the National Security Council. He then headed the International Economics Directorate of the National Economic Council (NEC) and National Security Council staffs at the White House. He advised President George W. Bush, the National Security Advisor, and the NEC chairman. He left the White House in 2004.

In 2006, Bush appointed Sullivan as United States Assistant Secretary of State for Economic, Energy, and Business Affairs. The United States Senate unanimously confirmed Sullivan in May of that year. He served in this capacity until January 2009. While serving as Assistant Secretary of State he owned a house in Anchorage and continued to vote in Alaska elections by absentee ballot, while claiming Bethesda, Maryland, as his primary residence for tax purposes; the State of Maryland determined that "the property tax benefits received were properly granted."

=== Alaska Attorney General ===
Alaska Attorney General Talis Colberg resigned in February 2009 over the Alaska Public Safety Commissioner dismissal scandal. Governor Sarah Palin nominated Wayne Anthony Ross for attorney general, but the Alaska Legislature rejected Ross. Palin nominated Sullivan. He was sworn into office in June 2009, while the Alaska Legislature was out of session. The Alaska Legislature unanimously confirmed Sullivan's appointment on April 9, 2010.

During his tenure as Alaska's attorney general and later as a U.S. senator, a particular focus of his efforts was the problem of domestic violence. According to Sullivan, "If you are a perpetrator of a crime, say an accused rapist, you get a 6th amendment right to counsel. That's under the constitution, but the victim of that crime gets nothing, and I think most Alaskans think that that victim should also have an attorney".

Sullivan was retained by Palin's successor, Governor Sean Parnell. He stepped down as attorney general on December 5, 2010, to be replaced by John J. Burns.

=== Commissioner of the Alaska Department of Natural Resources ===
On November 18, 2010, shortly after being elected, Alaska Governor Sean Parnell appointed Sullivan as Commissioner of the Alaska Department of Natural Resources, replacing former Commissioner Thomas E. Irwin. In 2013, during his term in office, Sullivan was deployed to Afghanistan for six weeks, in his role as the executive officer of the 4th Marine Division's Anti-Terrorism Battalion.

== U.S. Senate ==
=== Elections ===
==== 2014 ====
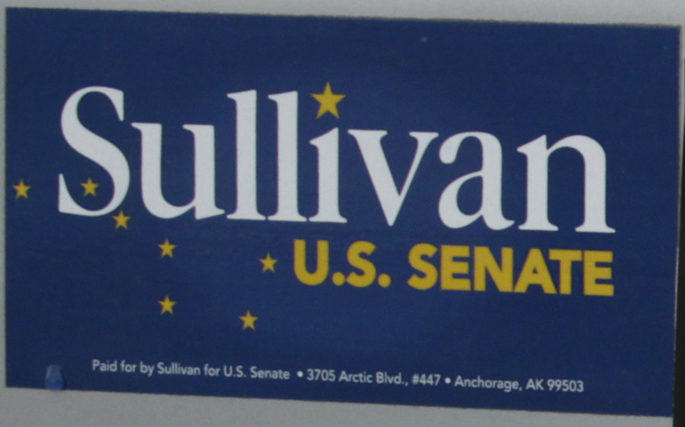
Bumper sticker from Sullivan's Senate campaign

On October 15, 2013, Sullivan announced his candidacy for the U.S. Senate seat held by Democratic incumbent Mark Begich in the 2014 election. He was endorsed by the Club for Growth. Begich had narrowly defeated longtime incumbent Ted Stevens in the previous election. Stevens had filed for the election in 2009 following his exoneration, and was widely expected to win, but died in a plane crash on August 9, 2010. This left the race for the Republican nomination wide open.

On June 10, 2014, Sullivan offered Begich the Alaska Agreement. This was a modified version of the People's Pledge. This tactic had previously been used in the Massachusetts 2012 U.S. Senate race between Elizabeth Warren and Scott Brown to drastically limit outside, third-party spending. Begich rejected the agreement. According to Ballotpedia, outside spending in the race hit nearly $40 million.

Despite former Governor Sarah Palin's late-race endorsement of 2010 party nominee Joe Miller, Sullivan won the August 19 Republican primary with 40% of the vote to Miller's 32% and Treadwell's 25%.

On November 12, 2014, the Associated Press and CNN declared that Sullivan had defeated Begich in the general election by about 8,000 votes—48.6% to 45.4%. At the time, there were approximately 31,000 votes left to count and Begich refused to concede. Begich eventually conceded on November 17. Final results showed that Sullivan won by 6,014 votes out of 282,400 cast, 47.96% to 45.83%.

==== 2020 ====
In the 2020 election, after running unopposed in the Republican primary election, Sullivan faced independent candidate Al Gross, an orthopedic surgeon and former commercial fisherman who had been nominated by the Alaska Democratic Party. The race was considered "unexpectedly close," with some polls indicating that the two candidates were neck-and-neck. Gross touted his "deep roots" in the state and published several campaign videos that received national attention. In addition to the Democratic Senatorial Campaign Committee's funding of Gross's candidacy, Gross reportedly did "an excellent job fundraising", outraising Sullivan between July 1 and the end of September 2019.

While the race was considered "too early to call" for several days after the November 3 election, Gross called Sullivan to concede on November 13. Ultimately, Sullivan defeated Gross 54% to 41%, with Alaskan Independence Party nominee John Howe receiving nearly 5% of the vote.

==== 2026 ====
Sullivan ran for reelection in 2026. In the general election, he faced Democratic nominee Mary Peltola and independent Daniel J. Sullivan Jr, who is unrelated to Senator Sullivan. The election was conducted by instant-runoff voting.

According to Alaska Public Media, AIPAC helped steer about $250,000 in individual donations to Sullivan's campaign during the first quarter of 2026.

In the 2026 election, two Senate candidates were named Dan Sullivan. The New York Times reported that Dan J. Sullivan Jr. was recruited by Peltola's campaign in a "ballot stacking" attempt to confuse voters. Peltola and her campaign denied these allegations.

Peltola won the election with 50.1% of the vote to Sullivan's 45.8%.

=== Tenure ===
Sullivan was sworn into office on January 6, 2015, by Vice President Joe Biden. According to The Washington Post, Sullivan has been "an ardent defender of Alaska Native Corporations, for-profit entities whose shares are held by Alaska Natives and provide Native communities land and economic support, and has successfully pushed to renew exceptions to bans on whale hunting and approve infrastructure projects that helped connect isolate Native communities."

=== 119th United States Congress committee assignments ===
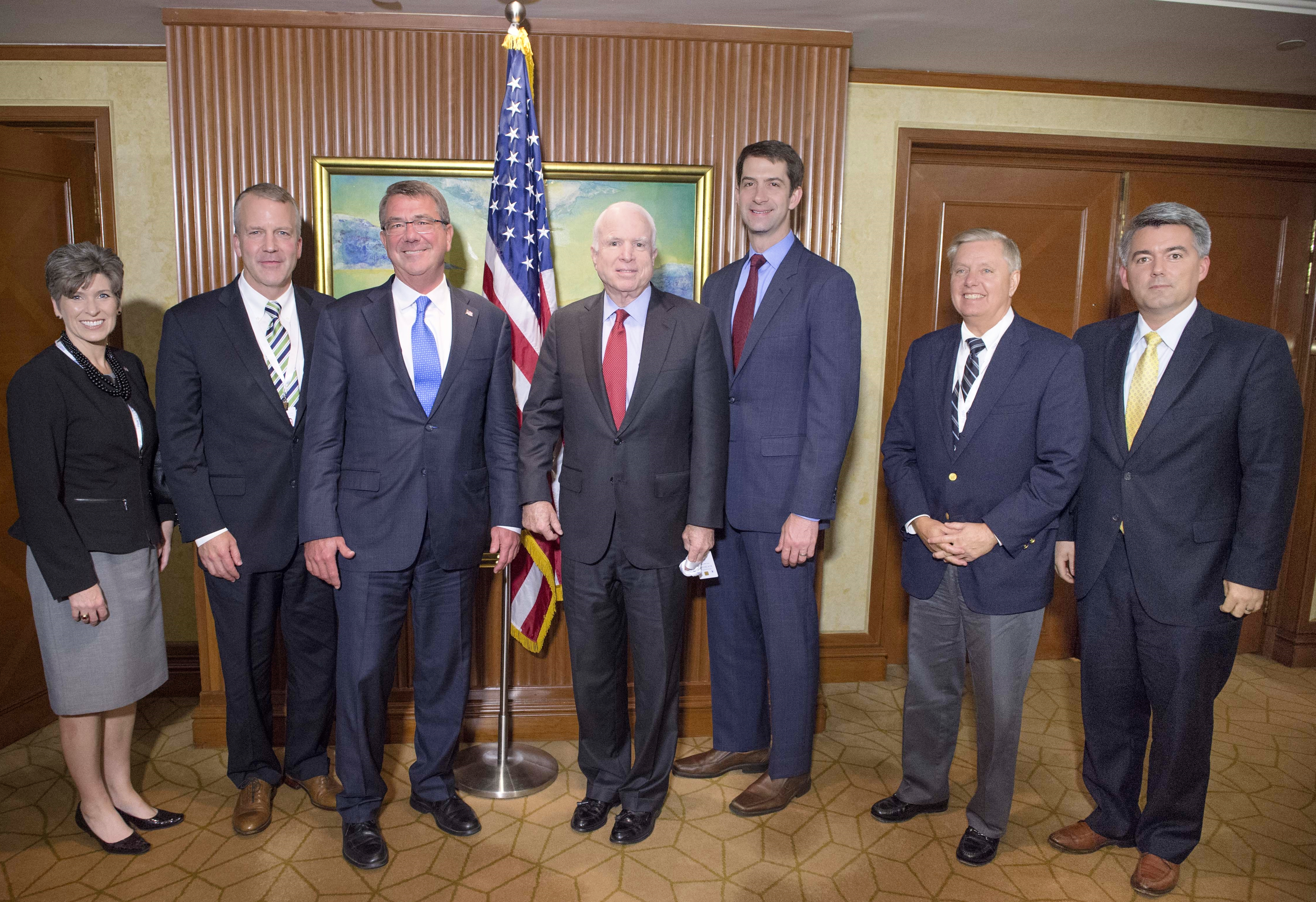
U.S. Secretary of Defense Ash Carter and Senators Joni Ernst, Dan Sullivan, John McCain, Tom Cotton, Lindsey Graham, and Cory Gardner attending the 2016 International Institute for Strategic Studies Asia Security Summit in Singapore

- Committee on Armed Services
  - Subcommittee on Airland
  - Subcommittee on Readiness and Management Support (chairman)
  - Subcommittee on Seapower
- Committee on Commerce, Science, and Transportation
- Committee on Environment and Public Works
- Committee on Veterans' Affairs

=== Caucuses ===
- Senate Republican Conference
- Senate Taiwan Caucus

== Political positions ==
According to Govtrack, Sullivan's voting record in the 118th Congress (2023-2025) was less conservative than 36 Republican senators, and more conservative than the 12 other Republican senators.

=== Donald Trump ===
Sullivan opposed Donald Trump during the 2016 United States presidential election, releasing a statement that said, "We need national leaders who can lead by example" on issues of sexual assault and violence against women. Sullivan added, "The reprehensible revelations about Donald Trump have shown that he can't. Therefore, I am withdrawing my support for his candidacy. Because I love Alaska and our country, I cannot and will not support Hillary Clinton."

Sullivan voted to acquit Trump in his first impeachment trial. During Sullivan's reelection bid, Trump endorsed him, saying Sullivan supported Trump's agenda.

On October 5, 2020, Sullivan announced that he would vote for Trump, saying the choice was "very clear". Sullivan also voted to acquit Trump in his second impeachment trial.

On May 28, 2021, Sullivan voted against creating an independent commission to investigate the 2021 United States Capitol attack.

Sullivan criticized the federal classified documents case against Trump in 2023. In 2024, he said the verdict in the prosecution of Donald Trump in New York "sets a dangerous precedent and pushes our great nation even further into banana republic territory."

In his 2025 annual address to the Alaska Legislature, Sullivan endorsed many policies of the second Trump administration, including DOGE's proposed spending cuts. Of DOGE's impact on the employment of federal workers, he said: "These are difficult decisions. Job losses are always difficult on the family, in communities, especially in tight-knit states like ours. There has been a successful historical precedent. President Clinton launched the National Partnership for Reinventing Government during his first year in office. Its goal was to dramatically shrink the government and make it more efficient, which he did during his presidency. That initiative saved over $108 billion, and it eliminated over 426,000 federal jobs." Sullivan voted for the Rescissions Act of 2025 that Trump requested congressional approval of. The Act defunded the Corporation for Public Broadcasting, which supported public radio and television stations. It also cut foreign aid.

Sullivan voted for the One Big Beautiful Bill Act (OBBBA), Trump's budget and tax bill, in July 2025.

In a June 2026 vote-a-rama, Sullivan voted with Senate Democrats and two other Senate Republicans for an amendment to ban the "Anti-Weaponization Fund" proposed by the U.S. Department of Justice. The amendment did not pass. Sullivan supported Trump's 2026 nomination of Todd Blanche for U.S. Attorney General. Sullivan was a decisive vote as Blanche was confirmed, 50–49. The Department of Justice subsequently launched an investigation into the 2026 United States Senate election in Alaska.

=== Environment ===
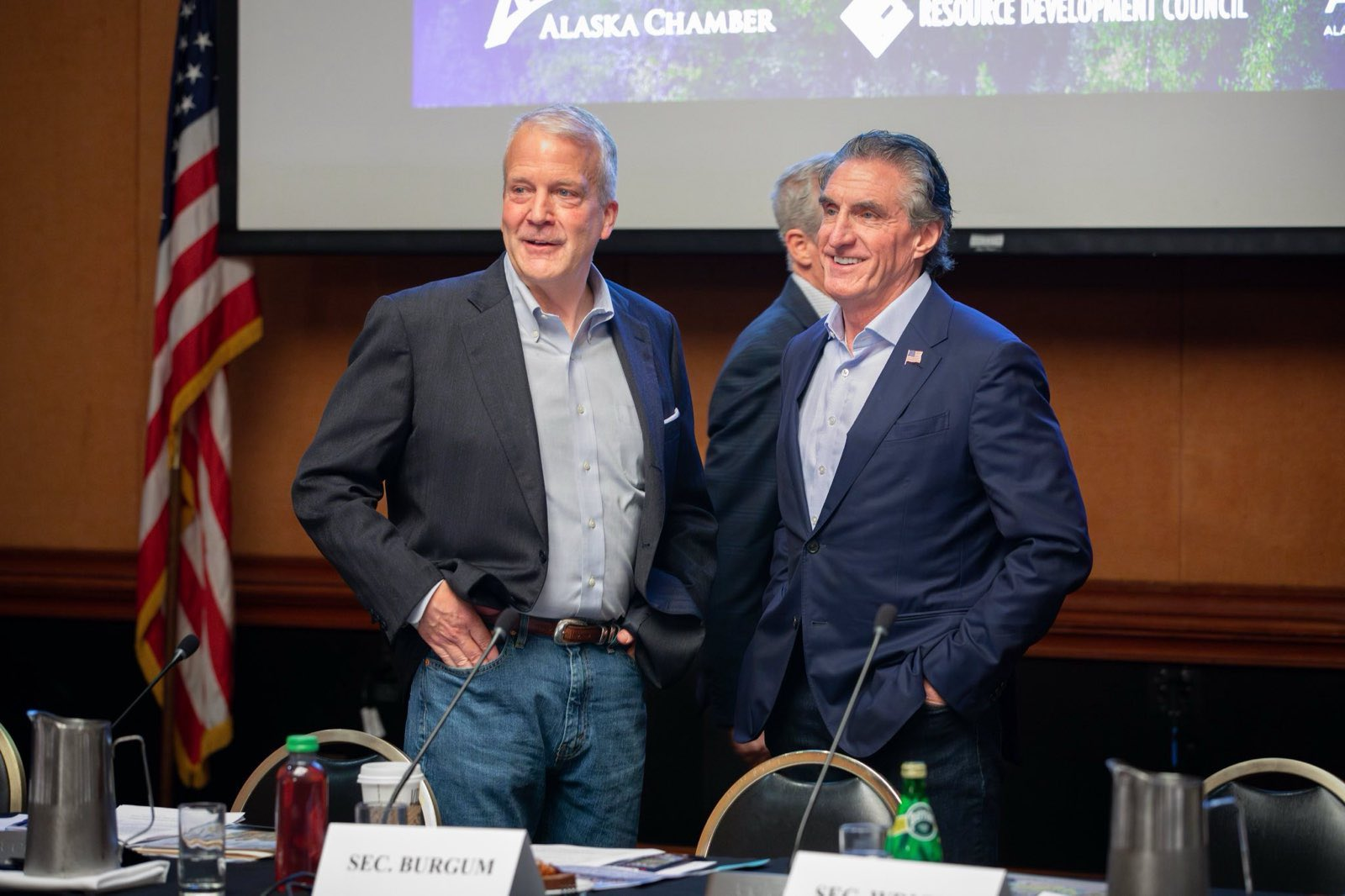
Sullivan with Interior Secretary Doug Burgum in Anchorage in June 2025

Sullivan rejects that there is a scientific consensus on climate change. He has argued that "the verdict is still out on the human contribution to climate change"; the scientific consensus is that human activity is the primary contributor to climate change.

In October 2020, the Environmental Investigation Agency recorded and published conversations between undercover actors, who pretended to be potential investors in Pebble Mine in Alaska, and corporate executives. In the recordings, the executives made clear that they intended to expand the mine substantially beyond their previously stated intentions, and that they believed Sullivan would surreptitiously support this project after the election. In response, Sullivan expressed his opposition to the project.

Sullivan lobbied the first Trump administration to open up the Tongass National Forest in Alaska to logging and other forms of development. In October 2020, the Trump administration permitted such projects, allowing logging companies to build roads on public lands.

In June 2024, Sullivan added a rider to the National Defense Authorization Act for Fiscal Year 2025 that would have required the Bureau of Land Management (BLM) to grant the Ambler Access Project right-of-way within 30 days of the act's passage, citing national security interests. The BLM had previously halted the project through a supplemental environmental impact statement. Sullivan's amendment was not included in the legislation's final version.

=== Foreign policy ===
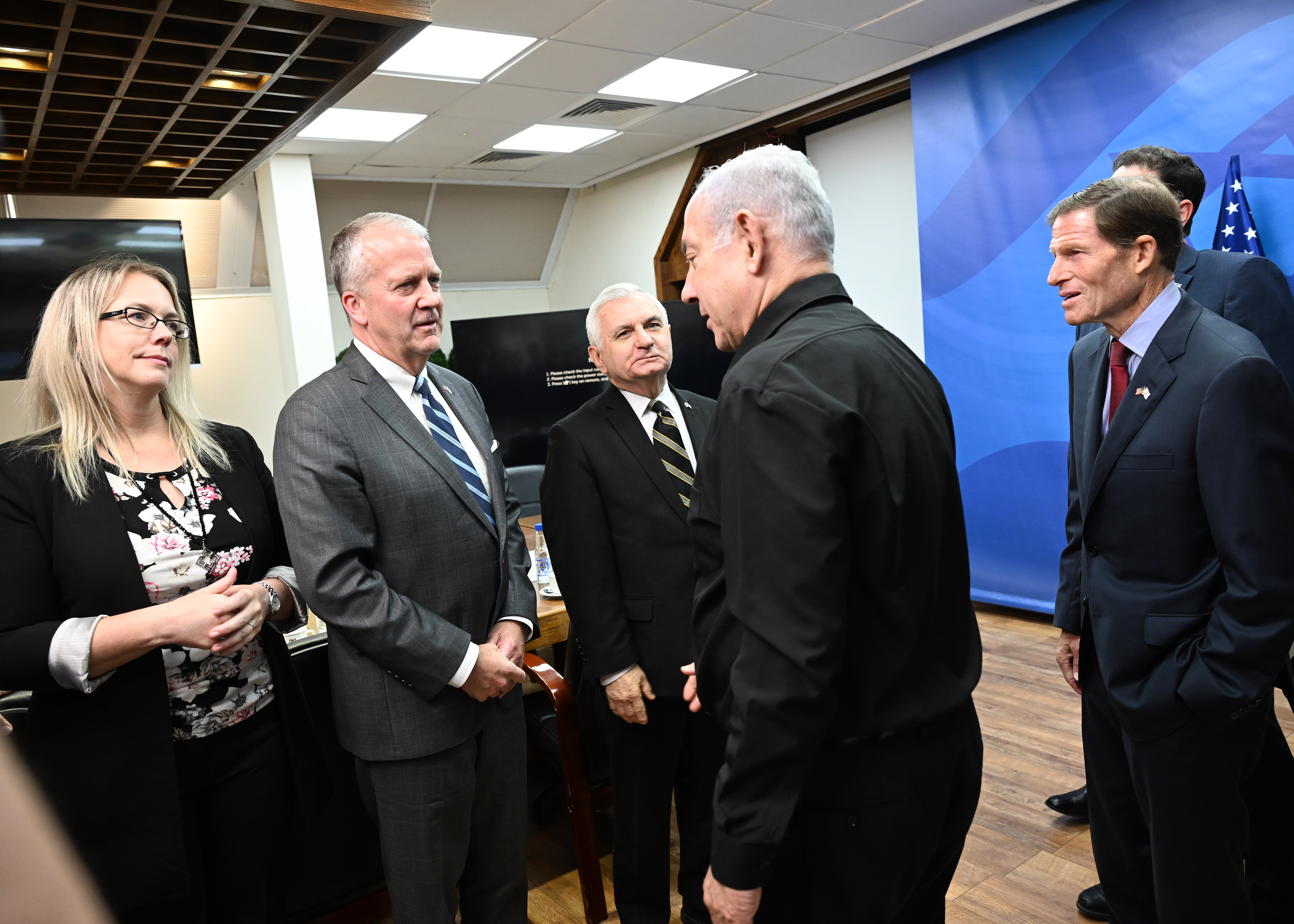
Sullivan with Israeli Prime Minister Benjamin Netanyahu in Israel on October 22, 2023

In July 2017, Sullivan co-sponsored the Israel Anti-Boycott Act (s. 720), which would have made it a federal crime for Americans to encourage or participate in boycotts against Israel and Israeli settlements in the occupied territories if protesting actions by the Israeli government.

On June 6, 2021, Sullivan and Senators Tammy Duckworth and Christopher Coons visited Taipei in an U.S. Air Force C-17 Globemaster III transport to meet President Tsai Ing-wen and Minister Joseph Wu during the pandemic outbreak of Taiwan to announce President Joe Biden's donation plan of 750,000 COVID-19 vaccines included in the global COVAX program.

In November 2023, Sullivan introduced an amendment blocking Russian seafood processed in China from being used in federal school lunch programs. The amendment passed the Senate.

In March 2025, during the 2025–2026 United States trade wars with Canada and Mexico, Sullivan said the federal government might suspend a rule (in the Passenger Vessel Services Act of 1886) so that Alaskan cruises could bypass Canadian ports: "Canada, you don't want to mess with Alaska. If you do, we're going to work hard on having our cruise ships bypass your ports, and that'll help our economy tremendously, it'll help our tourism industry tremendously, and it'll really hurt their tourism." In April 2025, Sullivan voted in support of Trump's tariffs on Canada.

Sullivan has supported the Trump administration in the 2026 Iran war. Sullivan's stated rationale for the war is that Iran has been hostile to the US for decades and should be prevented from having nuclear weapons or ballistic missiles. He voted against war powers resolutions that were intended to limit the war unless congressional consent was obtained. Sullivan's office defended his vote, saying he has supported broad presidential authority in protecting US national security interests regardless of the president's political party.

=== Gun policy ===
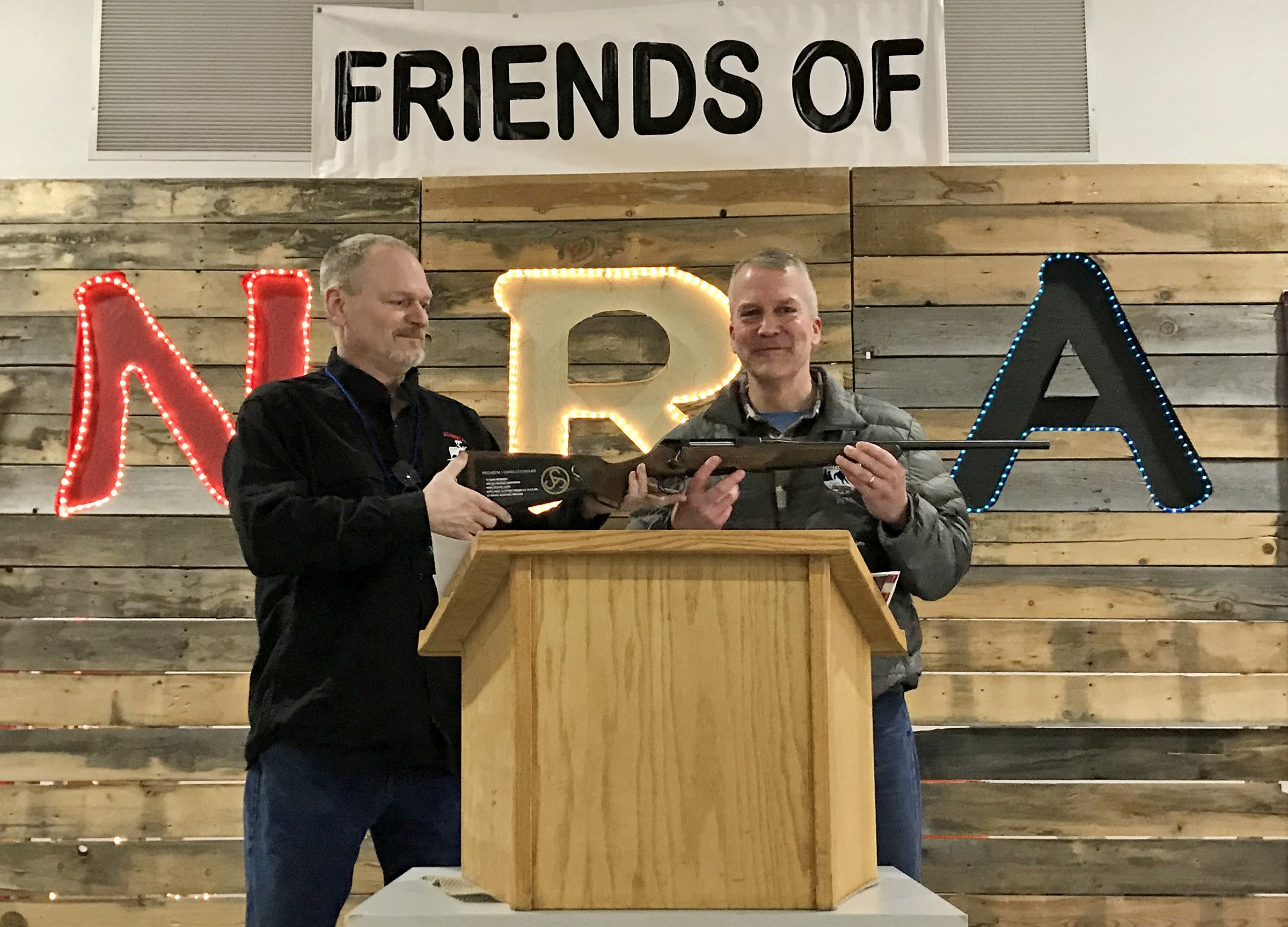
Dan Sullivan receiving a commemorative gun during a Friends of NRA event in Alaska

In the 2014 Senate campaign in Alaska, the NRA Political Victory Fund declined to make an endorsement. The NRA gave Begich an "A−" grade and Sullivan an "AQ" rating, the "Q" indicating the rating was qualified because Sullivan had no voting record at the time.

=== Health care ===
Sullivan opposed the Affordable Care Act and has voted to repeal it.

In 2021, Sullivan condemned President Joe Biden for his administration's policy that imposed mandatory COVID-19 vaccination requirements on approximately 80 million unvaccinated Americans by executive order. Sullivan said the Biden administration's assertion of a vaccine mandate's legitimacy was at odds with its own previous position. He added that such a measure would be an unwarrranted expansion of executive power, and that the federal government lacked a constitutional basis for mandating vaccines for tens of millions of individuals, companies, and families.

=== Judiciary ===
In 2016, Sullivan defended the Republican refusal to hold a hearing for President Barack Obama's Supreme Court nominee, Merrick Garland, on the basis that the nomination was made "in the midst of an important national election." Sullivan said it was not "about the individual, it's about the principle" and "Alaskans deserve to have a voice in that direction through their vote, and we will ensure that they have one." In October 2020, in the last few weeks before the 2020 presidential election, Sullivan defended Trump's decision to nominate a Supreme Court justice—saying he was "well within his constitutional authority"—and voted to confirm the nominee, Amy Coney Barrett.

In 2017, Sullivan voted to confirm Trump's Supreme Court nominee Neil Gorsuch. In 2018, he voted to confirm Trump's Supreme Court nominee Brett Kavanaugh. In 2022, he voted not to confirm President Biden's Supreme Court nominee Ketanji Brown Jackson.

=== National security ===
In 2017, after North Korean leader Kim Jong-un threatened the United States with an intercontinental ballistic missile (ICBM) strike and conducted an ICBM test in which its missile landed about 200 miles (320 km) off the coast of Japan, Sullivan called for improvements to the U.S. missile defense system.

In December 2020, during his lame-duck period, Trump vetoed the National Defense Authorization Act for Fiscal Year 2021. The veto left new Coast Guard cutters that were scheduled to be homeported in Alaska without port facilities to maintain them. Sullivan questioned the veto, because it put in question whether the cutters could be placed in Alaska.

=== Social policy ===
Sullivan has not made social issues a major part of his platform. In 2014, his abortion policy was that "abortion should be illegal except when necessary to save the life of the mother, or when the pregnancy is a result of rape or incest." In 2017, Sullivan supported defunding Planned Parenthood, according to his spokesman. He supported the 2022 Supreme Court decision Dobbs v. Jackson Women's Health Organization, which overruled Roe v. Wade. In 2025, he co-signed a letter from Senate Republicans to the United States Department of Health and Human Services (HHS) and Food and Drug Administration (FDA). The letter asked the HHS and FDA to reevaluate generic mifepristone (used in medication abortion) and to reinstate a requirement that it be prescribed in person.

In 2014, Sullivan supported "a constitutional amendment to ban gay marriage". In 2022, he voted for the Respect for Marriage Act, along with 11 other Senate Republicans. The bill protected same-sex marriage, but Sullivan said it was "much more about promoting and expanding religious liberty protections than same-sex marriage."

Sullivan introduced the bipartisan criminal justice reform legislation, the FIRST STEP Act, but opposed the act after it was amended by the House of Representatives. The amended bill passed the Senate 87–12 on December 18, 2018. Trump signed the bill into law three days later.

Sullivan cosponsored Senator Tim Scott's JUSTICE Act, which Scott said would provide "long-term solutions focused on police reform, accountability and transparency, while also promoting efforts to find solutions to systemic issues affecting people of color such as education and health disparities."

Sullivan has cosponsored the bipartisan STATES Act proposed in the 115th U.S. Congress by Senators Elizabeth Warren and Cory Gardner that would exempt individuals or corporations in compliance with state cannabis laws from federal enforcement of the Controlled Substances Act.

== Personal life ==
While at Georgetown, Sullivan met fellow law student Julie Fate, a staffer for U.S. Senator Ted Stevens. Sullivan and Fate married and had three daughters. Fate is the daughter of retired dentist and former Alaska State Representative Hugh "Bud" Fate and Mary Jane Fate, who was once the co-chair of the Alaska Federation of Natives. Sullivan is a Roman Catholic.

== Electoral history ==
Republican primary for the 2014 United States Senate election in Alaska
Party	Candidate	Votes	%
Republican	Dan Sullivan	44,740	40.05
Republican	Joe Miller	35,904	32.14
Republican	Mead Treadwell	27,807	24.90
Republican	John M. Jaramillo	3,246	2.91
Total votes		113,752	100.0

2014 United States Senate election in Alaska
Party	Candidate	Votes	%
Republican	Dan Sullivan	135,445	47.96
Democratic	Mark Begich (incumbent)	129,431	45.83
Libertarian	Mark S. Fish	10,512	3.72
Independent	Ted Gianoutsos	5,636	2.00
Write-in		1,376	0.49
Total votes		282,400	100.00

Republican primary for the 2020 United States Senate election in Alaska
Party	Candidate	Votes	%
Republican	Dan Sullivan (incumbent)	65,257	100.00%
Total votes		65,257	100.00%

2020 United States Senate election in Alaska
Party	Candidate	Votes	%
Republican	Dan Sullivan (incumbent)	191,112	53.90
Independent	Al Gross	146,068	41.19
Independence	John Howe	16,806	4.74
Write-in		601	0.17
Total votes		354,587	100.0%

== See also ==
- List of United States senators from Alaska

Legal offices
Preceded by Talis Colberg	Attorney General of Alaska; 2009–2010	Succeeded by John Burns
Party political offices
Preceded by Ted Stevens	Republican nominee for U.S. Senator from Alaska (Class 2); 2014, 2020, 2026; Served alongside: Gerald Heikes (2026)	Most recent
U.S. Senate
Preceded by Mark Begich	United States Senator (Class 2) from Alaska; 2015–present Served alongside: Lisa Murkowski	Incumbent
Preceded by Chris Smith	Chair of the Joint China Commission; 2025–present	Incumbent
U.S. order of precedence (ceremonial)
Preceded by James Lankford	Order of precedence of the United States as United States Senator	Succeeded by Chris Van Hollen
Preceded by Joni Ernst	United States senators by seniority 55th	Succeeded by Chris Van Hollen
