= You didn't build that =

Phrase from Barack Obama speech

"You didn't build that" is a phrase from a 2012 election campaign speech delivered by United States President Barack Obama on July 13, 2012, in Roanoke, Virginia. In the speech, Obama said: "Somebody helped to create this unbelievable American system that we have that allowed you to thrive. Somebody invested in roads and bridges. If you've got a business, you didn't build that."

The sentence "If you've got a business, you didn't build that" was publicized by his political opponents during the 2012 presidential campaign as an attack by Obama on business and entrepreneurs. The Obama campaign responded that the criticisms were taking the phrase out of context, and the word "that" in the phrase was referring to the construction of "roads and bridges" in the previous sentence.

Fact-checking organizations reported that Obama's remarks were incorrectly used out of context to criticize him. The Washington Post commented that his remarks reflected the belief, common among Democrats, that successful citizens owed their success partly to public infrastructure and government spending, and that they should contribute to finance public works. The Republican Party continued to use the phrase to criticize Obama throughout the 2012 presidential campaign.

== Background ==
In August 2011, while contemplating a run for the U.S. Senate, former White House financial reform adviser Elizabeth Warren gave a defense of progressive economic theory at an event in Andover, Massachusetts. On September 21, a video of Warren making the case for progressive economics received attention on the Internet and became a viral video. In the video, Warren aggressively rebuts the argument that asking the rich to pay more taxes is "class warfare", by arguing that no one grew rich in America without depending on government services paid for by the rest of society. Warren said:

I hear all this, you know, 'Well, this is class warfare, this is whatever.' No. There is nobody in this country who got rich on his own — nobody. You built a factory out there? Good for you. But I want to be clear. You moved your goods to market on the roads the rest of us paid for. You hired workers the rest of us paid to educate. You were safe in your factory because of police-forces and fire-forces that the rest of us paid for. You didn't have to worry that marauding bands would come and seize everything at your factory — and hire someone to protect against this — because of the work the rest of us did. Now look, you built a factory and it turned into something terrific, or a great idea. God bless — keep a big hunk of it. But part of the underlying social contract is, you take a hunk of that and pay forward for the next kid who comes along.

Obama later echoed Warren's thoughts when he spoke in Roanoke, Virginia, about how private businesses rely on government investments in infrastructure. In her victory speech on November 6, 2012, after winning the Senate election in Massachusetts, Elizabeth Warren made a callback, stating that it had been "an amazing campaign, and let me be clear, I didn't build that, you built that."

== Speech ==
On July 13, 2012, during a campaign swing through Virginia, Obama stopped in Roanoke to speak to supporters. In his remarks Obama noted that while he was willing to cut government waste, he would not gut investments that grow the economy or give tax breaks to millionaires like himself or Mitt Romney. Obama went on to say that rich people did not get rich solely due to their own talent and hard work, but that, to varying degrees, they owe some of their success to good fortune and the contributions of government. Obama said in this context:

There are a lot of wealthy, successful Americans who agree with me – because they want to give something back. They know they didn't – look, if you've been successful, you didn't get there on your own. You didn't get there on your own. I'm always struck by people who think, well, it must be because I was just so smart. There are a lot of smart people out there. It must be because I worked harder than everybody else. Let me tell you something – there are a whole bunch of hardworking people out there. (Applause.)

If you were successful, somebody along the line gave you some help. There was a great teacher somewhere in your life. Somebody helped to create this unbelievable American system that we have that allowed you to thrive. Somebody invested in roads and bridges. If you've got a business, you didn't build that. Somebody else made that happen. The Internet didn't get invented on its own. Government research created the Internet so that all the companies could make money off the Internet.

The point is, is that when we succeed, we succeed because of our individual initiative, but also because we do things together. There are some things, just like fighting fires, we don't do on our own. I mean, imagine if everybody had their own fire service. That would be a hard way to organize fighting fires.

Obama then cited the funding of the G.I. Bill, the creation of the middle class, the construction of the Golden Gate Bridge and Hoover Dam, creation of the Internet, and landing on the Moon as examples.

== Campaign statements ==
=== Romney campaign ===
The following Monday, July 16, former Massachusetts governor Mitt Romney spoke about the "you didn't build that" statement in a campaign stump speech. The following day, Romney rebuffed Obama's statement in Pennsylvania by saying:

To say that Steve Jobs didn't build Apple, that Henry Ford didn't build Ford Motors, that Papa John didn't build Papa John Pizza ... To say something like that, it's not just foolishness. It's insulting to every entrepreneur, every innovator in America.

— Mitt Romney

This was followed by campaign events with small business owners in multiple states (Pennsylvania, Wisconsin, Virginia, Ohio, Iowa, Missouri, North Carolina, Michigan, New Hampshire, New Mexico and Nevada); two small business owners who spoke at one of the campaign events in Florida have government contracts. A new part of the Romney campaign website was created, and merchandise related to the statement was produced.

The second day of the 2012 Republican National Convention was themed "We Built It" as both a celebration of small businesses and an attack on Obama's comments. Salon, Political Wire, and a humor website later commented on the fact that the stadium where the GOP hosted the "We Built It" theme at the convention was constructed using 62% taxpayer financing. Country music singer Lane Turner also performed a song at the event inspired from the speech called "I Built It".

=== Obama campaign ===
On July 17, 2012, the Obama campaign stated that the statement was taken out of context, and that the phrase referred to "roads and bridges" from the previous sentence. As the statement gained traction, the campaign ran new ads in multiple states (Virginia, North Carolina, Florida, Ohio, Iowa, and Nevada) where the President directly countered Romney's claims. In the ad Obama says while looking directly at the camera:

Those ads taking my words about small business out of context? They're flat out wrong ... Of course Americans build their own businesses.

— President Barack Obama

While speaking at the Oregon Convention Center in Portland, Oregon, on July 24, Obama rebuked the Romney campaign by saying:

And Mr. Romney disagrees with this, and he is entitled to his opinion. But the approach that he is talking about is not going to help small businesses and it's not going to create more markets for large businesses. He is wrong. We did not build this country on our own. We built it together. And if Mr. Romney doesn't understand that, then he doesn't understand what it takes to grow this economy in the 21st century for everybody.

— President Obama

In early September, Obama reflected on the controversy of the slogan's wording in an interview on Virginia's NBC 12:

I had talked about how we all have to invest in schools and roads and bridges for businesses to grow, for small businesses to be successful, that there is a part of our economy that is dependent on all of us making common cause. This is an example, I think, of the tendency of the other side to shade the truth a little bit to try to win political points.

— President Obama

== Response ==
The remark soon gained traction among Republicans, and was used as a hashtag on Twitter. The phrase was used by the Romney campaign to build a political meme. The Washington Post identified the quote in full in the Top 10 political quotes of 2012 in their article of December 28, 2012.

=== Conservative commentators ===
An opinion piece in The Wall Street Journal on July 17, 2012, stated that the speech is a "burst of ideological candor" and that the statement meant that "the self-made man is an illusion". In another Wall Street Journal piece, James Taranto wrote that "The president's remark was a direct attack on the principle of individual responsibility, the foundation of American freedom." Later, Kimberley Strassel wrote that the portion of the speech that spoke about Obama's views on the relationship between business and government was similar to statements made by Massachusetts Senate candidate Elizabeth Warren and that the effect of the speech was to "suck away the president's momentum".

In The Washington Post, Jennifer Rubin wrote that the statement showed that Obama "revealed a level of resentment toward the private sector that was startling, even to his critics", and that the speech reflects that "the anti-business assaults become the campaign. Meanwhile, his affection for government becomes a chip on his shoulder, prompting him to dare those private-sector wise guys to deny the centrality of government in their success." Glenn Kessler later said that the Obama statement was taken out of context and that he was speaking about higher taxes for the wealthy, comparing individual initiative to the system of many people working to create supporting infrastructure.

In The Atlantic, Andrew Cline wrote that what Obama said was an "enormous controversy – a philosophical rewriting of the American story" and that "With his Roanoke speech, Obama turned Jefferson on his head. In Obama's formulation, government is not a tool for the people's use, but the very foundation upon which all of American prosperity is built. Government is not dependent upon the people; the people are dependent upon the government." This, Cline writes, is fundamentally non-Jeffersonian. Earlier in the same publication, Clive Crook wrote that Obama's statements did not mean what his critics wrote they meant, but that the caricature resonates due to it being recognizable as part of his theme of the "rich aren't paying their fair share". Jonah Goldberg, in the National Review, wrote that Obama's "gaffe" was at best truism, and the reason for Obama's supporters attacking others, for taking Obama's words and progressive roots seriously, is because they do not portray Obama as a pragmatist and a moderate.

Guy Benson, on Townhall.com, wrote that the Romney campaign did not take Obama's words out of context since "Obama essentially posits that no private or individual success is possible in America without the government's help." Rachael Larimore, in Slate, wrote that it did not matter what Obama meant to say, as conservatives heard "You didn't get credit for your hard work", and even with the context of the entire speech, the reaction would be largely the same. More importantly, it damaged his relations with small-business owners. Rush Limbaugh commented that business owners did build the roads and bridges through their taxes, and that Obama wants to socialize private profit. Mark Levin, in reaction to the speech, said that Obama was "disrespecting the American people" and that "he despises the capitalist system". Josh Barro, in Bloomberg, wrote that Obama's speech was needlessly insulting, and that the statement resonated badly with people of all income levels.

=== Liberal commentators ===
In researching the 2002 Winter Olympics, NBC News' Domenico Montanaro posited that Romney had made a similar statement during his speech during those games' opening ceremony, where he said:

Tonight we cheer the Olympians, who only yesterday were children themselves. As we watch them over the next 16 days, we affirm that our aspirations, and those of our children and grandchildren, can become reality. We salute you Olympians – both because you dreamed and because you paid the price to make your dreams real. You guys pushed yourself, drove yourself, sacrificed, trained and competed time and again at winning and losing.
You Olympians, however, know you didn't get here solely on your own power. For most of you, loving parents, sisters or brothers, encouraged your hopes, coaches guided, communities built venues in order to organize competitions. All Olympians stand on the shoulders of those who lifted them. We've already cheered the Olympians, let's also cheer the parents, coaches, and communities. All right!

— Mitt Romney

In The Huffington Post, Michael Smerconish wrote that the Romney campaign did take the words out of context, but also that the message of the importance of social contracts was better worded by Warren. Nelson Davis, president of Nelson Davis Productions, rebuked the conservatives' take on what Obama had said in Roanoke, saying that the reason why the United States has become great is due to business and government working together. Keeping with the "You didn't build that" meme, Alan Colmes wrote that Romney will not have sewed his suit, would not have built the stage used during the 2012 Republican National Convention in Tampa Bay, Florida, and that his success at Bain Capital would not have been possible without government assistance. Anthony Gregory, of The Independent Institute, wrote that the implication of the speech was that the "state protects business interests so taxpayers have a partial claim on the wealth produced." Michael Cohen writing for The Guardian stated that the Republicans' usage of the phrase exemplifies that they "not only toil in their own narrowly and misleadingly constructed world, but really are just making stuff up."

In the New York Magazine, Jonathan Chait wrote that Romney's use of the words from the Roanoke speech as a "plan of blatantly lying" about it, and the reason why it works is because of a "broader subtext" of the speech due to Obama not using his normal voice, but speaking with a "black dialect". In Bloomberg Businessweek, Charles Kenny of the Center for Global Development also criticized the Romney campaign for taking the word out of context, and went on to state that American businesses benefit from infrastructure, and other elements of the "system" that Obama was speaking about in the speech. Media Matters made several posts targeting Fox News, and other news sources that Media Matters claimed were using Obama's words out of context through "deceptive" editing. Ezra Klein, on The Rachel Maddow Show, said that the political statements made in the Roanoke speech were not particularly controversial, and that people rely on others and themselves.

=== Fact-checking organizations ===
FactCheck.org said that the Romney campaign and Republicans have used quotations from the speech out of context, failing to include Obama's remarks about how infrastructure and education promote business success. In an update to the post, responses from the Obama campaign were added, explaining the president's intended meanings of infrastructure and education. FactCheck.org said "We don't know what the president had in mind when he uttered those words, and his intent is not clear. Regardless, our conclusion is the same: Taking snippets of his speech ignores the larger context of the president's meaning that a business owner does not become successful 'on your own.'" Romney was commended, however, for acknowledging Obama's wider context in a July 17 campaign speech Romney gave criticizing Obama's "You didn't build that" remark.

Politifact also criticized Romney advertisements, saying that the Romney campaign, "cherry-picked a quote that made it sound like Obama was dismissive of businesses when in fact he was making a point that success comes from the combination of 'individual initiative' and the fact that 'we do things together'", and that by doing so "Romney and his supporters have misled viewers and given a false impression."

=== Comedic commentators ===
On The Daily Show, a news satire program, Jon Stewart said that the Romney campaign was centering its campaign on a grammatical misstep taken out of context; he additionally said that both campaigns are guilty of focusing on gaffes, though Romney had taken it "one giant step further". On The Colbert Report, another news satire program, Stephen Colbert attempted to demonstrate that he is the only one responsible for his show's success by doing a segment of the program as a one man show, using an iPhone, desk lamp, and a whiteboard. "It didn't go so well", Meredith Blake of the LA Times reported. On The Tonight Show, Jay Leno during his opening monologue made a play on Obama's statement in regards to unemployment. Additionally, the controversy created by the speech has become the subject of numerous editorial cartoons. At the 2012 Alfred E. Smith Memorial Foundation Dinner, both Obama's and Romney's comedy routines included jokes with the punchline, "You [didn't] build that."
