= Attorney General Burns =

Attorney General Burns may refer to:

- Chris Burns (politician) (born 1949), Attorney General of the Northern Territory
- John J. Burns (Alaska politician) (born 1959), Attorney General of Alaska

== See also ==
- General Burns (disambiguation)
