= Margaret F. Nelson =

American Cherokee academic (1922–2018)

- Born: August 16, 1922; Claremore, Oklahoma, U.S.
- Died: August 2, 2018 (aged 95); Tahlequah, Oklahoma, U.S.
- Occupations: Academic; community organizer; politician

Academic background
- Education: Northwestern Oklahoma State University; Oklahoma State University
- Thesis: Ethnic identity in the prose works of N. Scott Momaday (1979)
- Doctoral advisor: Gordon Weaver

Academic work
- Discipline: Native American studies
- Institutions: Oklahoma State University

Margaret Faye Dawson Nelson (August 16, 1922 – August 2, 2018) was an American Cherokee Nation academic, community organizer, and politician. Born and raised in Claremore, Oklahoma, she studied at Northwestern Oklahoma State University and Oklahoma State University (OSU), where she had originally dropped out of after her marriage. She then worked as a professor at OSU, collaborated on Ohoyo Ikhana: A Bibliography of American Indian-Alaska Native Curriculum Materials (1982), and was a book reviewer for the American Indian Quarterly. She was a member of the National Advisory Council on Indian Education and the Cherokee Nation Election Commission, as well as the president of the North American Indian Women's Association's Oklahoma branch.

== Biography ==
Margaret Faye Dawson was born on August 16, 1922 in Claremore, Oklahoma; she was one of four children. After her parents' divorce, she was raised by her Cherokee paternal grandmother, who "did not encourage either the Cherokee language or customs". After graduating from Claremore High School in 1940, she began studying at Oklahoma State University (OSU). On August 1, 1942, she married William Ellis Nelson (died 1984), an aviation pedagogue at OSU and commercial pilot, and she subsequently dropped out of OSU. The family spent some time in Long Island during World War II, and they had five children.

In 1968, Nelson resumed her higher education studies, and in 1969 she obtained her BA in English in Northwestern Oklahoma State University, having to drive 40 miles back and forth to class every day; she later recalled that was "the hardest decision [she] ever had to make, to leave home and go back to school to complete my education, [but] one [she] never regretted" In addition to one Indiana University summer class on American folklore, where she was inspired to explore her Native American heritage, she also returned to OSU, where she joined their Department of English as a professor, got her MA in English in 1971 and her PhD in American folklore in 1979. Her doctoral dissertation Ethnic identity in the prose works of N. Scott Momaday was supervised by Gordon Weaver. She was promoted to assistant professor in 1980 and associate professor in 1984, remaining in that position until her retirement in 1990.

As an academic, Nelson worked in Native American studies. She and M. Frances Walton worked on Ohoyo Ikhana: A Bibliography of American Indian-Alaska Native Curriculum Materials, which was published by the Ohoyo Resource Center in 1982. She worked as an advisor for Native American students at OSU, and in 1984, she voiced her support for more Native American higher education students, concerned about financial issues and endemic dropouts. She wrote several book reviews for the American Indian Quarterly. She was also the benefactor of the Dawson-Nelson Akanadi Scholarship Fund. In 1988, she was appointed to the National Advisory Council on Indian Education by President Ronald Reagan, Helen Jaskoski said that she had "contributed significantly to furthering American Indian education".

Although she did not self-identify as a Native American activist, Nelson advocated for Native American issues. She worked as a community organizer for Native American community events in Oklahoma. In 1984, the Oklahoma Federation of Indian Women named her the 1984 Indian Woman of the Year. She also served in the North American Indian Women's Association in leadership roles, including as president of their Oklahoma branch and member of their national board, and she represented her state as a National Education Association delegate. She held enrolled Cherokee Nation citizenship, and chaired their Election Commission twice (1991 and 1994).

Nelson died on August 2, 2018 in Tahlequah, Oklahoma, where she had lived following her retirement, two weeks before her 96th birthday.

Nelson was part of the Tahlequah United Methodist Church.
