= 2012 United States Senate election in Massachusetts =

- November 6, 2012
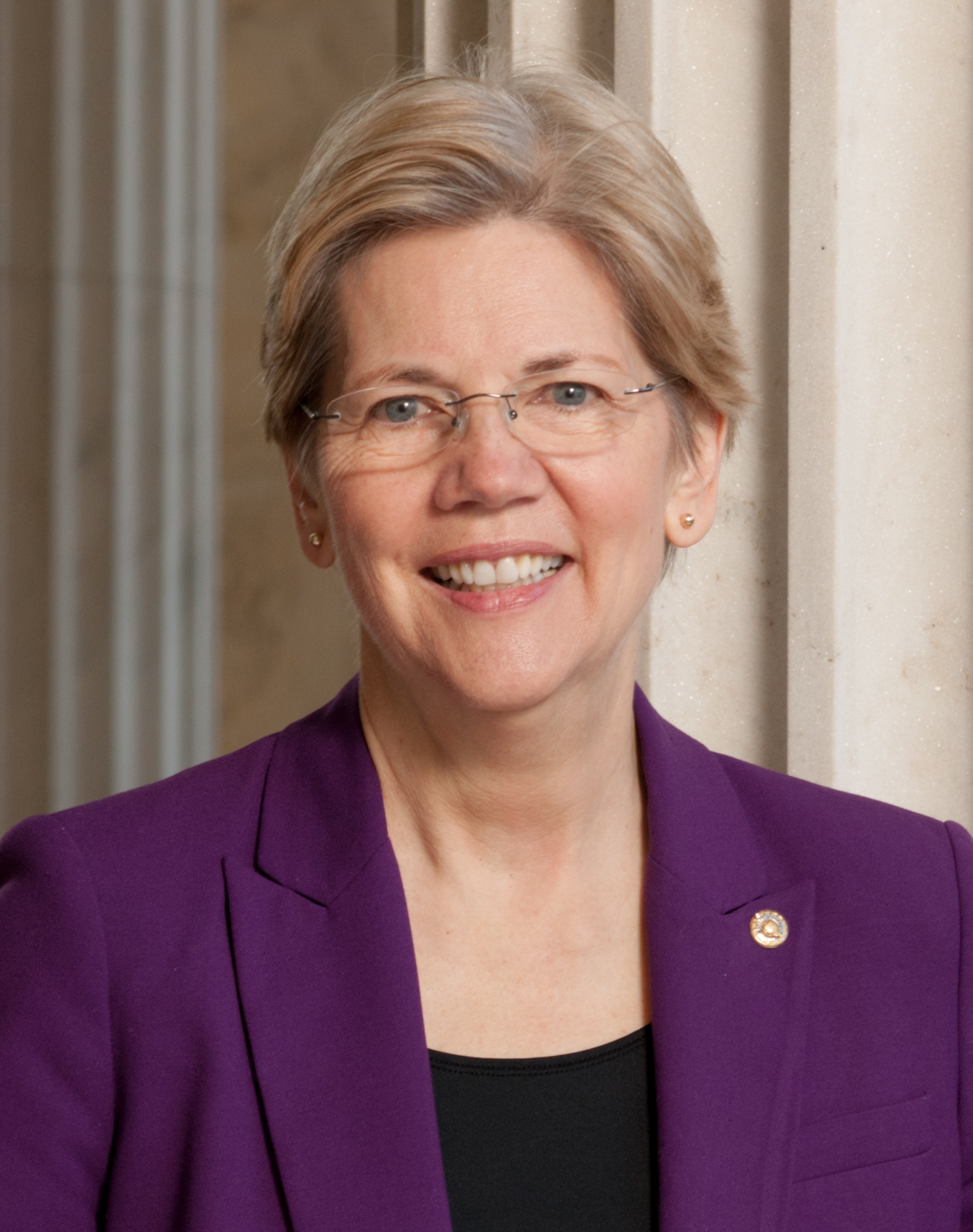

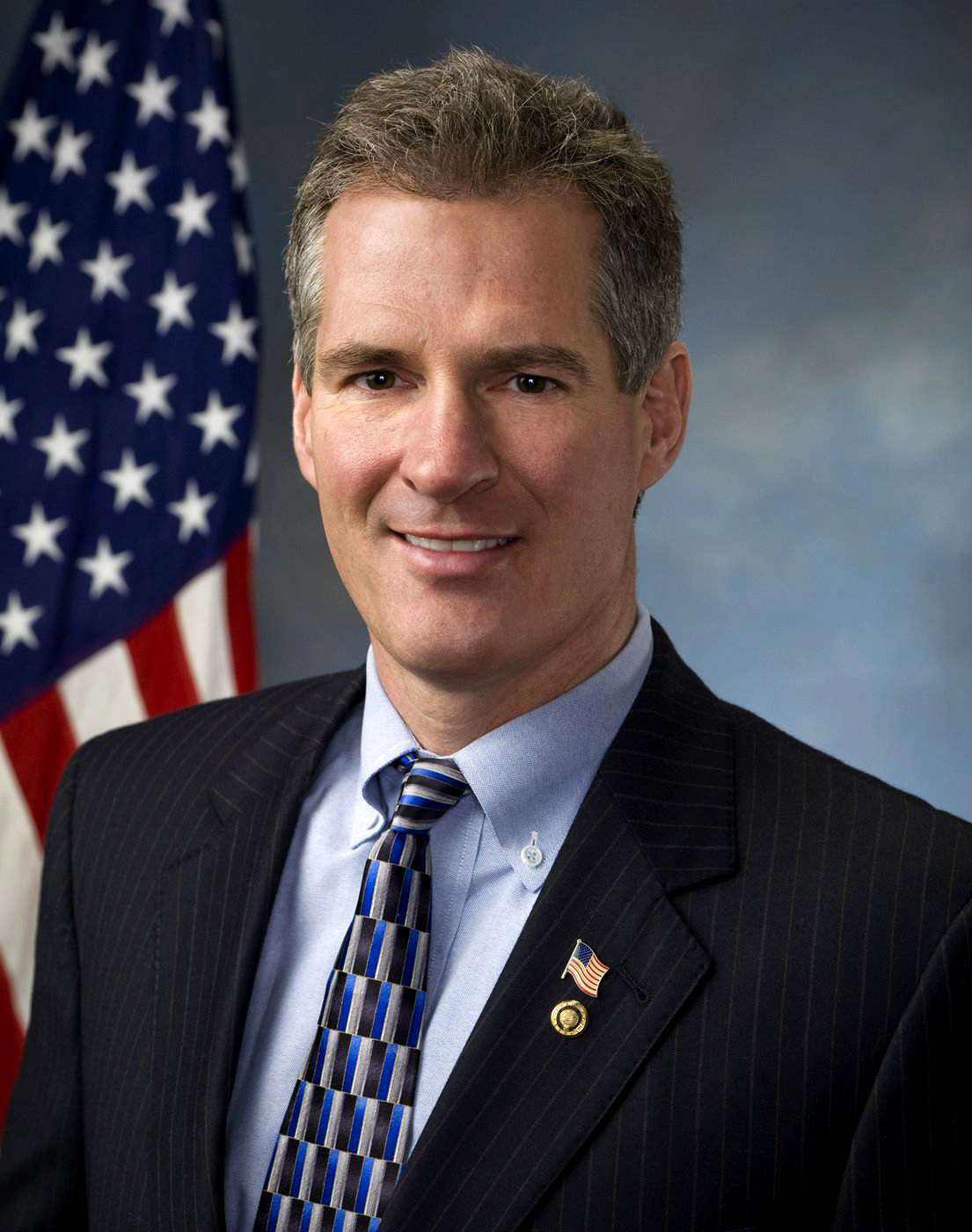
Nominee	Elizabeth Warren	Scott Brown
Party	Democratic	Republican
Popular vote	1,696,346	1,458,048
Percentage	53.74%	46.19%
- Warren: 40–50% 50–60% 60–70% 70–80% 80–90% >90% Brown: 40–50% 50–60% 60–70% 70–80% Tie: 40–50%
U.S. senator before election
Scott Brown
Republican
Elected U.S. Senator
Elizabeth Warren
Democratic

The 2012 United States Senate election in Massachusetts was held in Massachusetts on November 6, 2012, to elect a member of the United States Senate to represent the Commonwealth of Massachusetts. Democrat Elizabeth Warren defeated incumbent Republican Senator Scott Brown. This election was held concurrently with the U.S. presidential election and elections to the U.S. Senate in other states, elections to the House of Representatives, and various state and local elections.

Brown ran for re-election to a first full term. He was first elected in a 2010 special election triggered by the death of incumbent Democratic senator Ted Kennedy. Brown was unopposed in the 2012 Republican primary. For the Democrats, an initial wide field of prospective candidates narrowed after the entry of Harvard Law School professor Elizabeth Warren, the architect of the Consumer Financial Protection Bureau. Warren clinched near-unanimous party support, with all but one of the other Democratic candidates withdrawing following her entrance. After winning her party's nomination, she faced Brown in the general election.

The election was one of the most-followed races in 2012 and cost approximately $82 million, which made it the most expensive election in Massachusetts history and the second-most expensive in the entire 2012 election cycle, next to the presidential race; this was despite the two candidates' having agreed not to allow outside money to influence the race. Opinion polling indicated a close race for much of the campaign, though Warren opened up a small but consistent lead in the final few weeks. She went on to defeat Brown by over 236,000 votes, 54% to 46%. Despite his loss, Brown received 8.6% more of the state vote than Republican former governor of Massachusetts Mitt Romney did in the concurrent presidential election and won five counties that voted Democratic in the concurrent presidential race: Barnstable, Essex, Norfolk, Plymouth, and Worcester.

This is the last Massachusetts U.S. Senate race that was decided by a single-digit margin or where the incumbent was defeated. Brown was the only incumbent U.S. senator to lose a general election in 2012. He later moved to New Hampshire, where he ran for the U.S. Senate and lost in 2014. Warren was sworn in on January 3, 2013.

== Background ==
Democratic U.S. Senator Ted Kennedy was re-elected in 2006, and died on August 25, 2009, from a malignant brain tumor. On September 24, 2009, Massachusetts Governor Deval Patrick appointed longtime friend of Kennedy and former Democratic National Committee chairman Paul G. Kirk to succeed Kennedy until a special election could be held. Kirk's appointment was especially controversial, as the governor's ability to appoint an interim senator was removed during the Romney administration by the Democratic-controlled legislature, as a precaution if senator and presidential nominee John Kerry was elected president in 2004. Laws surrounding Senate appointment were quickly changed following Kennedy's death. The Massachusetts Republican Party sued in an attempt to halt Kirk's appointment, but it was rejected by Suffolk Superior Court Judge Thomas Connolly.

In the special election held on January 19, 2010, Republican state senator Scott Brown defeated Democratic state attorney general Martha Coakley in an upset victory. Brown thus became the first Republican to be elected from Massachusetts to the United States Senate since Edward Brooke in 1972, and he began serving the remainder of Kennedy's term on February 4, 2010.

== Republican primary ==
The National Republican Trust PAC, a group integral to Brown's 2010 election, vowed to draft a conservative opponent, citing dissatisfaction with his vote in support of the New START nuclear arms treaty. However, Brown went unopposed in the Republican primary.

=== Candidates ===
==== Nominee ====
- Scott Brown, incumbent U.S. senator

=== Polling ===
Poll source	Date(s) administered	Sample size	Margin of error	Scott Brown	More conservative challenger	Other	Undecided
Public Policy Polling	September 16–18, 2011	255	±6.1%	70%	21%	—	9%

=== Results ===
Republican primary results
Party	Candidate	Votes	%
Republican	Scott Brown (incumbent)	133,860	99.46
Republican	Write-ins	733	0.54
Total votes		134,593	100.00

== Democratic primary ==
The Massachusetts Democratic Convention was held on June 2, 2012, where Warren received 95.77% of delegate votes. As the only candidate with 15% of delegate votes necessary to qualify for the primary ballot, Warren eliminated her challenger Marisa DeFranco, becoming the de facto nominee. The Democratic primary was held on September 6, 2012, with Warren running unopposed.

=== Candidates ===
==== Nominee ====
- Elizabeth Warren, Harvard Law School professor and architect of the Consumer Financial Protection Bureau

==== Eliminated at convention ====
- Marisa DeFranco, immigration lawyer

==== Withdrawn ====
- Tom Conroy, state representative (withdrew December 12, 2011)
- Alan Khazei, founder of City Year (withdrew October 26, 2011)
- James Coyne King, corporate lawyer (withdrew March 21, 2012)
- Bob Massie, entrepreneur and nominee for Lieutenant Governor of Massachusetts in 1994 (withdrew October 7, 2011)
- Herb Robinson, engineer (withdrew December 15, 2011)
- Setti Warren, mayor of Newton (withdrew September 29, 2011; endorsed E. Warren, no relation)

==== Declined ====
- Mike Capuano, U.S. representative
- Kim Driscoll, mayor of Salem
- Barney Frank, U.S. representative
- Joseph P. Kennedy II, former U.S. representative
- Victoria Reggie Kennedy, Ted Kennedy's widow
- Stephen Lynch, U.S. representative
- Rachel Maddow, television host and political commentator
- Marty Meehan, former U.S. representative
- Thomas Menino, mayor of Boston
- Deval Patrick, governor of Massachusetts
- John F. Tierney, U.S. representative
- Warren Tolman, former state senator and former state representative

=== Polling ===
Poll source	Date(s) administered	Sample size	Margin of error	Tom Conroy	Marisa DeFranco	Jim King	Alan Khazei	Bob Massie	Herb Robinson	Elizabeth Warren	Setti Warren	Other	Undecided
Public Policy Polling	September 16–18, 2011	461	±4.6%	7%	2%	—	9%	2%	1%	55%	1%	—	22%
UMass Lowell	September 22–28, 2011	1,005	±3.8%	5%	4%	—	3%	3%	1%	36%	3%	1%	32%
YouGov for UMass Amherst	November 9–22, 2011	122	±4.6%	7%	6%	—	—	—	2%	73%	—	13%	—
Suffolk University/7NEWS	February 11–15, 2012	218	±?%	—	5%	1%	—	—	—	72%	—	—	20%
Suffolk University/7NEWS	May 20–22, 2012	284	±?%	—	6%	—	—	—	—	71%	—	—	12%

=== Results ===
Democratic convention vote
Party	Candidate	Votes	%
Democratic	Elizabeth Warren	3,352	95.77
Democratic	Marisa DeFranco	148	4.23
Total votes		3,500	100.00

Democratic primary vote
Party	Candidate	Votes	%
Democratic	Elizabeth Warren	308,979	97.59
Democratic	Write-ins	7,638	2.41
Total votes		316,617	100.00

== General election ==
=== Campaign ===
On September 14, 2011, Warren declared her intention to run for the Democratic nomination for the 2012 election in Massachusetts for the United States Senate. The seat had been won by Republican Scott Brown in a 2010 special election after the death of Ted Kennedy.

Warren won the Democratic nomination on June 2, 2012, at the state Democratic convention with a record 95.77% of the votes of delegates. She was endorsed by the governor of Massachusetts, Deval Patrick. Warren and her opponent Scott Brown agreed to engage in four televised debates, including one with a consortium of media outlets in Springfield and one on WBZ-TV in Boston.

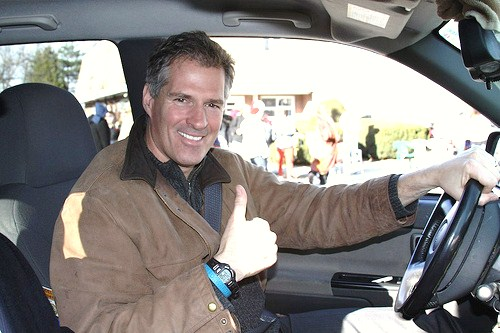
Brown campaigning in his truck

Brown ran as a moderate, stressing his ability to cross party lines and highlighting his votes for the Dodd-Frank financial reform law and to repeal "don't ask, don't tell". Warren campaigned on a platform championing the middle class, and supporting Wall Street regulation. Warren criticized Brown for continually voting with Republican leadership, and argued that he was not the bipartisan moderate he claimed to be. A staple of Brown's attack tactics against Warren was his consistent reference to her as "Professor Warren", in attempt to portray her as an elitist academic. Brown faced blowback after the second debate, during which he claimed conservative Antonin Scalia was a "model" Supreme Court Justice, prompting boos from the debate audience.

Warren spoke at the 2012 Democratic National Convention immediately before Bill Clinton on the penultimate night of the convention. Warren contrasted President Obama's economic plan with Mitt Romney's in the 2012 election and rebuked the Republican Party's economic policy, stating: "Their vision is clear: 'I've got mine, and the rest of you are on your own.'" Warren positioned herself as a champion of a beleaguered middle class that, as she said, "has been chipped, squeezed and hammered." According to Warren, "People feel like the system is rigged against them. And here's the painful part: They're right. The system is rigged." Warren said that Wall Street CEOs "wrecked our economy and destroyed millions of jobs" and that they "still strut around congress, no shame, demanding favors, and acting like we should thank them." Brown attended the 2012 Republican National Convention, but was not a speaker there. According to Brown, he had rejected an offer to play a larger role, and limited his attendance to a single day because of scheduling demands.

Following Todd Akin's controversial "legitimate rape" comments, Brown was the first sitting senator to demand he drop out of the Missouri U.S. Senate race. He also called on his party to "recognize in its platform that you can be pro-choice and still be a good Republican." Brown's campaign had been endorsed by many Massachusetts Democrats, many of whom were prominently featured in his campaign ads.

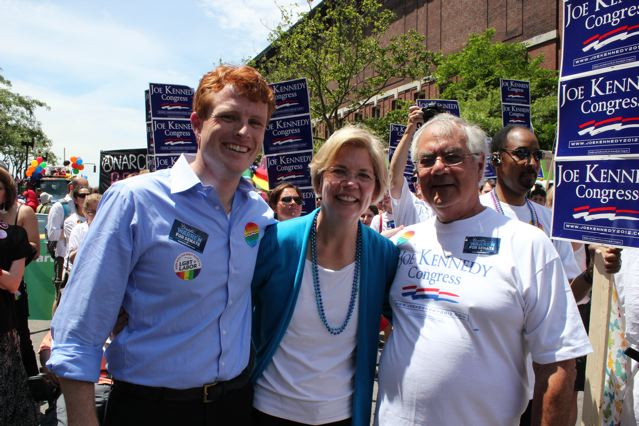
Warren campaigning with retiring Congressman Barney Frank (right) and his eventual successor, Joe Kennedy III (left)

In September 2011, a video of Warren explaining her approach to economic policy gained popularity on the internet. In the video, Warren rebuts the charge that asking the rich to pay more taxes is "class warfare", pointing out that no one grew rich in America without depending on infrastructure paid for by the rest of society, stating:

There is nobody in this country who got rich on his own. Nobody. ... You moved your goods to market on the roads the rest of us paid for; you hired workers the rest of us paid to educate; you were safe in your factory because of police forces and fire forces that the rest of us paid for. You didn't have to worry that marauding bands would come and seize everything at your factory, and hire someone to protect against this, because of the work the rest of us did. Now look, you built a factory and it turned into something terrific, or a great idea. God bless. Keep a big hunk of it. But part of the underlying social contract is, you take a hunk of that and pay forward for the next kid who comes along.

On July 13, 2012, President Obama sparked a controversy when he echoed her thoughts in a campaign speech saying, "Somebody helped to create this unbelievable American system that we have that allowed you to thrive. Somebody invested in roads and bridges. If you've got a business—you didn't build that. Somebody else made that happen."

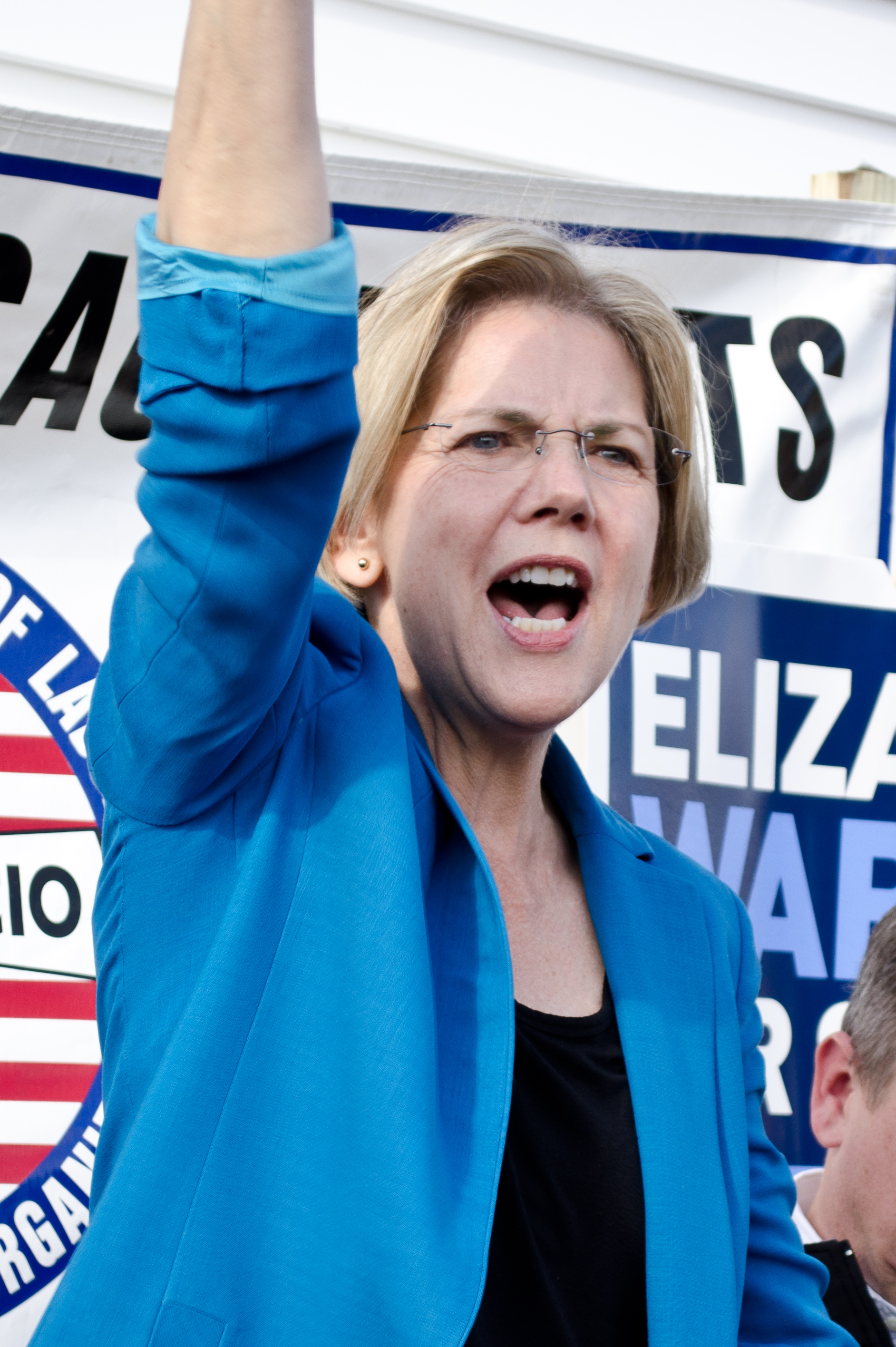
Warren at a campaign event, November 2012

Warren encountered significant opposition from business interests. In August 2012, Rob Engstrom, political director for the United States Chamber of Commerce, claimed that "no other candidate in 2012 represents a greater threat to free enterprise than Professor Warren." She nonetheless raised $39 million for her campaign, the most of any Senate candidate in 2012.

Results by municipality

==== Native American ancestry controversy ====
In April 2012, the Boston Herald sparked an election controversy when it drew attention to Warren's Association of American Law Schools (AALS) directory entries from 1986 to 1995, which listed her as a minority professor. According to the AALS, the directory was compiled by information supplied by law school deans, based on questionnaires filled out by individual teachers. Warren stated that she had self-identified as having Native American ancestry in order to meet others with a similar background. Harvard Law School had listed her as a minority professor in response to criticisms about a lack of faculty diversity, but Warren said that she was unaware of this until she read about it in a newspaper during the 2012 election.

Her opponent Scott Brown speculated that she had fabricated a native ancestry to gain an advantage in the employment market; the Brown campaign used Warren's lineage in several attack ads. In response, Warren's brothers issued a joint statement stating that they "grew up listening to our mother and grandmother and other relatives talk about our family's Cherokee and Delaware heritage". Brian Leiter of the Chicago Law School dismissed the allegations against Warren, noting that law schools have "no pressure to hire Native Americans for affirmative action reasons", and that Warren's record of scholarship was "clearly sufficient to get her appointed at Harvard". Several Brown staffers mocked Warren by doing the "tomahawk chop" at a Brown campaign rally, which Brown said he did not condone.

According to the New England Historical Genealogical Society, several members of Warren's maternal family claim Cherokee heritage; the society found a family newsletter that alluded to a marriage license application that listed Elizabeth Warren's great-great-great-grandmother as a Cherokee, but could not find the primary document and found no proof of Warren's Native American heritage. Some members of the Cherokee Nation protested her claim to Native American ancestry and questioned whether she benefitted from it. Former colleagues and supervisors at the universities where she had worked (including Charles Fried, former solicitor general under President Ronald Reagan) said Warren's ancestry was either not mentioned, or played no role in her hiring.

The question of Warren's ancestry was pressed by the Brown campaign throughout the election. However, polls showed that most voters said that the controversy would not impact their vote in the election. Warren's 2014 autobiography devoted a section to the allegations, describing them as untrue and hurtful. In 2018, Warren released the results of a DNA test that strongly suggests that she had a Native American ancestor six to ten generations ago, and suggests Warren is between 1/64th and 1/1,024th Native American.

=== Endorsements ===
Scott Brown

Politicians

- Bob Ambler, Democratic former state representative
- Robert A. Antonioni, Democratic former state senator
- Kelly Ayotte, U.S. senator (R-NH)
- Michael Bloomberg, mayor of New York City
- Arthur Broadhurst, Democratic former state representative
- Paul C. Casey, Democratic former state representative
- Paul Cellucci, former governor of Massachusetts and U.S. ambassador to Canada
- Chris Christie, governor of New Jersey
- Susan Collins, U.S. senator (R-ME)
- Robert Durand, Democratic former state representative
- Lewis Evangelidis, Worcester County sheriff
- Christopher Fallon, Democratic state representative, 33rd Middlesex District
- Kimberly Ferguson, state representative, 1st Worcester District
- Raymond Flynn, former mayor of Boston and U.S. ambassador to the Holy See
- Larry Giordano, Democratic former state representative
- Rudy Giuliani, former mayor of New York City
- Geoff Hall, Democratic former state representative
- Bradley Jones, Jr., minority leader of the Massachusetts House of Representatives
- Judith Flanagan Kennedy, mayor of Lynn
- Michael Knapik, state senator, 2nd Hampden and Hampshire District
- Richard Lugar, U.S. senator (R-IN)
- Konstantina Lukes, Democratic City Councilor and former mayor of Worcester
- John McCain, U.S. senator (R-AZ)
- David Nangle, Democratic state representative, 17th Middlesex District
- Shaunna O'Connell, state representative, 3rd Bristol District
- Keiko Orrall, state representative, 12th Bristol District
- Marie Parente, Democratic former state representative
- Karyn Polito, former state representative
- Marco Rubio, U.S. senator (R-FL)
- Charles Ryan, Democratic former mayor of Springfield
- Olympia Snowe, U.S. senator (R-ME)
- Philip Travis, Democratic former state representative
- Anthony Verga, Democratic former state representative
- William Weld, former governor of Massachusetts
- Christine Todd Whitman, former governor of New Jersey
- Donald Wong, state representative, 9th Essex District

Labor unions

- Boston Police Superior Officers Federation
- MBTA Police Patrolmen's Association
- MBTA Police Sergeants Association
- State Police Association of Massachusetts

Military

- Thomas J. Hudner, Jr., Medal of Honor recipient
- Thomas G. Kelley, Medal of Honor recipient and former Massachusetts secretary of veterans' services

Newspapers

- Boston Herald
- Cape Cod Times
- The Daily Free Press
- The Eagle-Tribune
- The Enterprise
- Gloucester Daily Times
- Newburyport Daily News
- The Patriot Ledger
- The Salem News
- Sentinel & Enterprise
- The Sun
- Worcester Telegram & Gazette

Individuals

- Drew Bledsoe, retired New England Patriots player
- Lenny Clarke, comedian
- Bob Cousy, retired Boston Celtics player
- Dave Cowens, retired Boston Celtics player
- Steve DeOssie, retired New England Patriots player
- Steve Grogan, retired New England Patriots player
- Wendy Murphy, newspaper columnist and co-host on WRKO talk radio
- Fred Smerlas, retired New England Patriots player
- JoJo White, retired Boston Celtics player

Organizations

- ConservAmerica
- GOProud
- Humane Society Legislative Fund
- Log Cabin Republicans
- Massachusetts Citizens for Life
- National Federation of Independent Business
- Republican Majority for Choice
- United States Chamber of Commerce

Rescinded

- Micky Ward, boxer
Elizabeth Warren

Politicians

- Sheila Bair, Republican former chair of the Federal Deposit Insurance Corporation
- Bill Bradley, former U.S. senator (D-NJ)
- Gary Christenson, mayor of Malden
- Max Cleland, former U.S. senator (D-GA)
- Bill Clinton, former president of the United States
- Tom Conroy, state representative, 13th Middlesex District
- Joseph Curtatone, mayor of Somerville
- Howard Dean, 2004 presidential candidate and former governor of Vermont and chairman of the DNC
- Rosa DeLauro, member of the U.S. House of Representatives from Connecticut
- Robert DeLeo, speaker of the Massachusetts House of Representatives, 19th Suffolk District
- Michael Dukakis, former governor of Massachusetts
- Russ Feingold, former U.S. senator (D-WI)
- Barney Frank, member of the U.S. House of Representatives from Massachusetts
- Al Franken, U.S. senator (D-MN)
- Kamala Harris, attorney general of California
- Patrick J. Kennedy, former U.S. representative from Rhode Island and son of Ted Kennedy
- John Kerry, U.S. senator (D-MA)
- Alan Khazei, social entrepreneur
- John Lewis, member of the U.S. House of Representatives from Georgia
- Raymond Mariano, former mayor of Worcester
- Michael J. McGlynn, mayor of Medford
- Jim McGovern, member of the U.S. House of Representatives from Massachusetts
- Thomas Menino, mayor of Boston
- Barbara Mikulski, U.S. senator (D-MD)
- Alex Morse, mayor of Holyoke
- Patrick O. Murphy, mayor of Lowell
- Therese Murray, president of the Massachusetts Senate, Plymouth and Barnstable District
- Tim Murray, lieutenant governor of Massachusetts
- Richard Neal, member of the U.S. House of Representatives from Massachusetts
- Barack Obama, president of the United States
- Joseph C. O'Brien, former mayor of Worcester
- John Olver, member of the U.S. House of Representatives from Massachusetts
- Deval Patrick, governor of Massachusetts
- Joseph Petty, mayor of Worcester
- Sharon Pollard, former mayor of Methuen
- Ayanna Pressley, member of the Boston City Council
- Stan Rosenberg, president pro tempore of the Massachusetts Senate, Hampshire and Franklin District
- Bernie Sanders, U.S. senator (I-VT)
- John Scibak, state representative, 2nd Hampshire District
- Kathleen Sebelius, U.S. secretary of health and human services and former governor of Kansas
- Jeanne Shaheen, U.S. senator (D-NH)
- Ellen Story, state representative, 3rd Hampshire District
- Niki Tsongas, member of the U.S. House of Representatives from Massachusetts
- Setti Warren, mayor of Newton

Labor unions

- Massachusetts AFL–CIO
- Massachusetts Nurses Association
- Massachusetts Service Employees International Union
- National Education Association
- United Auto Workers

Newspapers

- The Berkshire Eagle
- The Boston Globe
- The Harvard Crimson
- The MetroWest Daily News
- The Republican
- The Standard-Times
- The Sun Chronicle

Individuals

- Ben Affleck, actor
- Timothy Paul Baymon, archbishop, president of the Council of Churches of Greater Springfield
- Cher, singer and actress
- Sandra Fluke, women's rights activist
- Jennifer Garner, actress
- Caroline Kennedy, daughter of John F. Kennedy
- Edward M. Kennedy, Jr., investment banker and son of Ted Kennedy
- Joseph P. Kennedy III, candidate for the U.S. House of Representatives from Massachusetts
- Bob Massie, priest, author, and social activist
- Reverend Eugene Rivers, co-founder of the Boston TenPoint Coalition
- Bruce Springsteen, singer
- James Taylor, singer

Organizations

- Clean Water Action
- Council for a Livable World
- Democracy for America
- EMILY's List
- Human Rights Campaign
- Massachusetts Democratic Party
- NARAL Pro-Choice America
- National Organization for Women
- Planned Parenthood
- Progressive Democrats of America
- Sierra Club
- Young Democrats of America

=== Debates ===
Both candidates agreed to four televised debates, three of which were held. The candidates agreed to a fourth debate which was to be held on October 30 in WGBH-TV's studio, hosted by a Boston media^{B} consortium, and moderated by John King, but the day before both pulled out due to Hurricane Sandy. Victoria Kennedy, widow of Ted Kennedy, had proposed an additional debate with Tom Brokaw as moderator, but Brown would only accept the invitation if she pledged not to endorse Brown's opponent, which she refused.

Debate 1: September 20 at WBZ-TV studio, hosted by WBZ and WBZ Newsradio 1030. Moderated by the station's political reporter Jon Keller.

- Complete video of debate – C-SPAN

Debate 2: October 1 at UMass Lowell, co-hosted by UMass and the Boston Herald. Moderated by David Gregory.

- Complete video of debate – C-SPAN

Debate 3: October 10 at Springfield Symphony Hall, hosted by a Western Massachusetts^{A} consortium. Moderated by WGBY-TV's Jim Madigan.

- Complete video of debate – C-SPAN

=== Fundraising ===
The election cost approximately $82 million, making it the most expensive election in Massachusetts' history and of any Congressional race in history up to that point, as well as the second-most expensive election in the 2012 election cycle, behind only the 2012 presidential election.

==== The People's Pledge ====
Both Warren and Brown stated early in the race that they would not accept television advertisement assistance from Super PACs and interest groups. On January 23, 2012, both candidates signed the agreement, or People's Pledge. While no outside groups were obligated by the agreement, both candidates agreed to donate a sum equal to 50% of an advertisement run by any groups to a charity of the other candidate's choice. The pledge was broken twice, by Brown supporters. In March the American Petroleum Institute and Coalition of Americans for Political Equality launched ads supporting Brown, and as a result, the Brown campaign agreed to make donations of $1,000 and $34,545, respectively, to the charity of Warren's choice: the Autism Consortium.

==== Top donors ====
Contributions by affiliation^{C}
Source: OpenSecrets 2012

Scott Brown		Elizabeth Warren	
Contributor	Contribution	Contributor	Contribution
Fidelity Investments	$289,455	EMILY's List	$507,095
EMC Corporation	$169,800	Moveon.org	$448,517
Goldman Sachs	$119,400	Harvard University	$304,050
VoteSane PAC	$113,250	MIT	$77,200
State Street Corp	$106,650	Boston University	$73,700
MassMutual	$106,198	Brown Rudnick LLP	$68,077
Raytheon	$89,350	University of California	$63,600
Liberty Mutual	$85,500	League of Conservation Voters	$54,551
JPMorgan Chase	$80,855	Ropes & Gray	$52,950
PricewaterhouseCoopers	$79,800	Thornton & Naumes	$44,450

Contributions by industry
Source: OpenSecrets 2012

Scott Brown		Elizabeth Warren	
Industry	Contribution	Industry	Contribution
Retired	$3,574,088	Retired	$3,374,569
Securities & investment	$3,370,618	Lawyers/law firms	$2,196,972
Lawyers/law firms	$1,332,582	Women's issues	$1,588,383
Real estate	$1,192,258	Education	$1,335,058
Insurance	$914,504	Democratic/Liberal	$1,253,375
Health professionals	$877,878	Securities & investment	$534,275
Misc. finance	$828,501	TV/movies/music	$476,814
Business services	$661,647	Health professionals	$456,006
Computer industry/Internet	$637,825	Business services	$455,291
Republican/Conservative	$616,158	Printing & publishing	$387,031

=== Predictions ===
Source	Ranking	As of
The Cook Political Report	Tossup	November 1, 2012
Sabato's Crystal Ball	Lean D (flip)	November 5, 2012
Rothenberg Political Report	Tilt D (flip)	November 2, 2012
Real Clear Politics	Tossup	November 5, 2012

=== Polling ===
View source data.

Poll source	Date(s) administered	Sample size	Margin of error	Scott Brown (R)	Elizabeth Warren (D)	Other	Undecided
W. New England U.	March 6–10, 2011	472 RV	±4.5%	51%	34%	—	14%
Public Policy Polling	June 2–5, 2011	957 RV	±3.2%	47%	32%	—	21%
WBUR MassInc	August 30 – September 1, 2011	500	±4.4%	44%	35%	2%	19%
Public Policy Polling	September 16–18, 2011	957 RV	±3.2%	44%	46%	—	10%
UMass Lowell	September 22–28, 2011	1,005 RV	±3.8%	41%	38%	3%	14%
W. New England U.	September 29 – October 5, 2011	475 RV	±4.5%	47%	42%	—	10%
YouGov for UMass Amherst	November 9–22, 2011	433 RV	±4.4%	39%	43%	4%	14%
UMass Lowell /Boston Herald	December 1–6, 2011	505 RV	±5.3%	42%	49%	3%	6%
Opinion Dynamics for Mass Insight	January 31 – February 4, 2012	456 RV	±4.6%	52%	42%	—	6%
MassINC for WBUR	February 6–9, 2012	505 LV	±4.4%	43%	46%	1%	11%
Suffolk/WHDH	February 11–15, 2012	600 LV	±4%	49%	40%	2%	9%
Rasmussen Reports	February 29, 2012	500 LV	±4.5%	49%	44%	2%	5%
W. New England U.	February 23 – March 1, 2012	527 RV	±4.3%	49%	41%	—	10%
Public Policy Polling	March 16–18, 2012	936 RV	±3.2%	41%	46%	—	13%
Boston Globe	March 21–27, 2012	544 LV	±4.2%	37%	35%	—	26%
Rasmussen Reports	April 9, 2012	500 LV	±4.5%	45%	46%	1%	8%
MassINC for MassLive	April 25–28, 2012	438 LV	±4.7%	41%	43%	1%	12%
Rasmussen Reports	May 7, 2012	500 LV	±4.5%	45%	45%	2%	8%
Suffolk/WHDH	May 20–22, 2012	600 LV	±4%	48%	47%	—	5%
Boston Globe	May 25–31, 2012	651 LV	±3.8%	39%	37%	2%	23%
W. New England U.	May 29–31, 2012	504 RV	±4.4%	43%	45%	—	11%
Public Policy Polling	June 22–24, 2012	902 RV	±3.3%	46%	46%	—	8%
MassINC	July 19–22, 2012	445 RV	±4.4%	38%	40%	—	16%
Public Policy Polling	August 16–19, 2012	1,115 LV	±4.4%	49%	44%	—	8%
Kimball Political Consulting	August 21, 2012	1,500 RV	±4%	49%	43%	—	9%
Kimball Political Consulting	September 7–9, 2012	756 LV	±3.5%	46%	45%	—	9%
W. New England U.	September 6–13, 2012	444 LV	±4.6%	44%	50%	—	6%
Public Policy Polling	September 13–16, 2012	876 LV	±3.3%	46%	48%	—	6%
Suffolk/WHDH	September 13–16, 2012	600 LV	±4%	44%	48%	—	8%
UMass Lowell /Boston Herald	September 13–17, 2012	497 LV	±4%	49%	45%	1%	4%
MassINC for WBUR	September 15–17, 2012	507 LV	±4.4%	40%	45%	2%	12%
Kimball Political Consulting	September 20, 2012	868 LV	±3.25%	48%	47%	1%	3%
UMass Lowell /Boston Herald	September 20, 2012	524 RV	±5.3%	50%	44%	1%	5%
Rasmussen Reports	September 24, 2012	500 LV	±4.5%	48%	48%	—	5%
Boston Globe	September 21–27, 2012	502 LV	±4.4%	38%	43%	1%	18%
WBUR	September 26–28, 2012	504 LV	±4.4%	45%	49%	1%	6%
Opinion Dynamics for Mass Insight	September 25–30, 2012	329 LV	±5.4%	44%	48%	—	8%
W. New England U.	September 28 – October 4, 2012	440 LV	±4.3%	45%	50%	—	5%
MassINC for WBUR	October 5–7, 2012	501 LV	±4.4%	48%	45%	1%	8%
YouGov for UMass Amherst	October 2–8, 2012	436 LV	±5.4%	45%	48%	—	6%
Rasmussen Reports	October 10, 2012	500 LV	±4.5%	47%	49%	—	4%
YouGov	October 4–11, 2012	669 LV	±4.9%	39%	46%	—	15%
Public Policy Polling	October 9–11, 2012	1,051 LV	±3%	44%	50%	—	6%
Public Policy Polling for the LCV	October 15–16, 2012	709 LV	±3.5%	44%	53%	—	—
Kimball Political Consulting	October 18–21, 2012	761 LV	±3.5%	45%	48%	—	7%
MassINC for WBUR	October 21–22, 2012	516 LV	±4.4%	44%	50%	1%	4%
Rasmussen Reports	October 25, 2012	500 LV	±4.5%	47%	52%	—	—
Boston Globe	October 24–28, 2012	583 LV	±4.1%	47%	47%	—	6%
Suffolk/WHDH	October 25–28, 2012	600 LV	±4%	46%	53%	—	1%
W. New England U.	October 26 – November 1, 2012	535 LV	±4%	46%	50%	—	4%
Public Policy Polling	November 1–2, 2012	1,089 LV	±3%	46%	52%	—	2%
UMass Lowell/Boston Herald	October 31 – November 3, 2012	800 LV	±4.1%	49%	48%	1%	1%

* RV= Registered voters; LV= Likely voters

Hypothetical polling

Poll source	Date(s) administered	Sample size	Margin of error	Scott Brown (R)	Mike Capuano (D)	Other	Undecided
Public Policy Polling	November 29 – December 1, 2010	500	±4.4%	52%	36%	—	12%
Western N.E. College	March 6–10, 2011	472	±4.5%	51%	38%	—	10%
7News/Suffolk University	April 3–5, 2011	500	±4.4%	52%	26%	1%	21%
Public Policy Polling	June 2–5, 2011	957	±3.2%	48%	38%	—	14%

Poll source	Date(s) administered	Sample size	Margin of error	Scott Brown (R)	Martha Coakley (D)	Other	Undecided
Public Policy Polling	June 2–5, 2011	957	±3.2%	49%	40%	—	10%
UMass Lowell	September 22–28, 2011	1,005	±3.8%	41%	40%	4%	15%

Poll source	Date(s) administered	Sample size	Margin of error	Scott Brown (R)	Tom Conroy (D)	Other	Undecided
Public Policy Polling	September 16–18, 2011	957	±3.2%	50%	31%	—	18%
UMass Lowell	September 22–28, 2011	499	±5.4%	46%	25%	5%	24%

Poll source	Date(s) administered	Sample size	Margin of error	Scott Brown (R)	Marisa DeFranco (D)	Other	Undecided
UMass Lowell	September 22–28, 2011	499	±5.4%	48%	22%	4%	26%
Suffolk/WHDH	February 11–15, 2012	600	±4%	55%	22%	2%	22%
Suffolk/WHDH	May 20–22, 2012	600	±4%	49%	28%	—	24%

Poll source	Date(s) administered	Sample size	Margin of error	Scott Brown (R)	Alan Khazei (D)	Other	Undecided
Public Policy Polling	June 2–5, 2011	957	±3.2%	50%	31%	—	19%
WBUR MassInc	August 30 – September 1, 2011	500	±4.4%	45%	30%	2%	22%
Public Policy Polling	September 16–18, 2011	957	±3.2%	48%	33%	—	18%
UMass Lowell	September 22–28, 2011	506	±5.3%	40%	28%	6%	26%
Western N.E. College	September 29 – October 5, 2011	475	±4.5%	52%	35%	—	13%

Poll source	Date(s) administered	Sample size	Margin of error	Scott Brown (R)	Joseph P. Kennedy II (D)	Other	Undecided
7News/Suffolk University	April 3–5, 2011	500	±4.4%	45%	40%	—	14%
UMass Lowell	September 22–28, 2011	499	±5.4%	37%	45%	4%	14%

Poll source	Date(s) administered	Sample size	Margin of error	Scott Brown (R)	Vicki Kennedy (D)	Other	Undecided
Public Policy Polling	November 29 – December 1, 2010	500	±4.4%	48%	41%	—	11%
7News/Suffolk University	April 3–5, 2011	500	±4.4%	52%	30%	—	18%

Poll source	Date(s) administered	Sample size	Margin of error	Scott Brown (R)	Jim King (D)	Other	Undecided
Suffolk/WHDH	February 11–15, 2012	600	±4%	57%	21%	2%	20%

Poll source	Date(s) administered	Sample size	Margin of error	Scott Brown (R)	Stephen Lynch (D)	Other	Undecided
Public Policy Polling	November 29 – December 1, 2010	500	±4.4%	49%	30%	—	20%

Poll source	Date(s) administered	Sample size	Margin of error	Scott Brown (R)	Rachel Maddow (D)	Other	Undecided
Public Policy Polling	June 2–5, 2011	957	±3.2%	49%	29%	—	21%

Poll source	Date(s) administered	Sample size	Margin of error	Scott Brown (R)	Ed Markey (D)	Other	Undecided
Public Policy Polling	November 29 – December 1, 2010	500	±4.4%	49%	39%	—	13%
7News/Suffolk University	April 3–5, 2011	500	±4.4%	53%	26%	—	20%
Public Policy Polling	June 2–5, 2011	957	±3.2%	47%	37%	—	16%

Poll source	Date(s) administered	Sample size	Margin of error	Scott Brown (R)	Bob Massie (D)	Other	Undecided
Public Policy Polling	June 2–5, 2011	957	±3.2%	48%	25%	—	27%
WBUR MassInc	August 30 – September 1, 2011	500	±4.4%	45%	29%	3%	23%
Public Policy Polling	September 16–18, 2011	957	±3.2%	49%	31%	—	21%
UMass Lowell	September 22–28, 2011	506	±5.4%	43%	27%	5%	26%

Poll source	Date(s) administered	Sample size	Margin of error	Scott Brown (R)	Tim Murray (D)	Other	Undecided
7News/Suffolk University	April 3–5, 2011	500	±4.4%	51%	23%	1%	24%

Poll source	Date(s) administered	Sample size	Margin of error	Scott Brown (R)	Deval Patrick (D)	Other	Undecided
Public Policy Polling	November 29 – December 1, 2010	500	±4.4%	49%	42%	—	9%
7News/Suffolk University	April 3–5, 2011	500	±4.4%	52%	37%	—	11%
UMass Lowell	September 22–28, 2011	506	±5.4%	36%	43%	5%	16%

Poll source	Date(s) administered	Sample size	Margin of error	Scott Brown (R)	Herb Robinson (D)	Other	Undecided
UMass Lowell	September 22–28, 2011	499	±5.4%	51%	18%	5%	25%

Poll source	Date(s) administered	Sample size	Margin of error	Scott Brown (R)	Setti Warren (D)	Other	Undecided
7News/Suffolk University	April 3–5, 2011	500	±4.4%	52%	9%	3%	36%
Public Policy Polling	June 2–5, 2011	957	±3.2%	48%	23%	—	29%
WBUR MassInc	August 30 – September 1, 2011	500	±4.4%	46%	28%	3%	24%
Public Policy Polling	September 16–18, 2011	957	±3.2%	47%	32%	—	21%
UMass Lowell	September 22–28, 2011	506	±5.4%	43%	28%	6%	23%

=== Results ===
Despite the Obama campaign's easy victory in the state, and winning all of the state's counties, Warren significantly underperformed Obama's margin. As expected, Warren performed very well in Suffolk County, which is home to the state's largest city and its capital Boston. Brown performed well in the southern part of the state near Cape Cod. Warren made history by becoming the first woman from Massachusetts elected to the U.S. Senate.

United States Senate election in Massachusetts, 2012
Party	Candidate	Votes	%	±%
Democratic	Elizabeth Warren	1,696,346	53.74	+6.67
Republican	Scott Brown (incumbent)	1,458,048	46.19	−5.64
Write-in		2,159	0.07	+0.02
Total votes		3,156,553	100.00	N/A
Democratic gain from Republican				

==== By county ====
By county

County	Elizabeth Warren Democratic		Scott Brown Republican		All others	
County	#	%	#	%	#	%
Barnstable	63,277	47.6	69,597	52.4	42	0.01
Berkshire	45,256	70.7	18,683	29.2	32	0.1
Bristol	125,906	52.4	114,277	47.6	108	0.01
Dukes	7,387	67.7	3,520	32.3	5	0.01
Essex	180,861	49.5	184,225	50.4	189	0.1
Franklin	25,114	66.7	12,495	33.2	27	0.1
Hampden	108,414	54.4	90,538	45.5	216	0.1
Hampshire	52,417	65.7	27,827	34.2	75	0.1
Middlesex	420,142	55.9	331,004	44.0	545	0.1
Nantucket	3,435	56.4	2,653	43.6	3	0.01
Norfolk	174,269	49.0	181,187	50.9	2,584	0.1
Plymouth	111,643	43.6	144,172	56.3	137	0.1
Suffolk	208,779	72.6	78,469	27.3	293	0.1
Worcester	168,446	45.8	199,401	54.2	264	0.1
Totals	1,696,346	53.74	1,458,048	46.19	2,159	0.07

Counties that flipped from Republican to Democratic

- Bristol (largest municipality: New Bedford)
- Hampden (largest municipality: Springfield)

==== By congressional district ====
Warren won five of nine congressional districts, while Brown won four, which all elected Democrats.

District	Brown	Warren	Representative
1st	42.83%	57.17%	John Olver (112th Congress)
1st	42.83%	57.17%	Richard Neal (113th Congress)
2nd	48.55%	51.45%	Richard Neal (112th Congress)
2nd	48.55%	51.45%	Jim McGovern (113th Congress)
3rd	50.82%	49.18%	Jim McGovern (112th Congress)
3rd	50.82%	49.18%	Niki Tsongas (113th Congress)
4th	50.35%	49.65%	Barney Frank (112th Congress)
4th	50.35%	49.65%	Joe Kennedy III (113th Congress)
5th	41.22%	58.78%	Niki Tsongas (112th Congress)
5th	41.22%	58.78%	Ed Markey (113th Congress)
6th	53.62%	46.38%	John F. Tierney
7th	21.36%	78.64%	Ed Markey (112th Congress)
7th	21.36%	78.64%	Michael Capuano (113th Congress)
8th	49.90%	50.10%	Michael Capuano (112th Congress)
8th	49.90%	50.10%	Stephen Lynch (113th Congress)
9th	51.12%	48.88%	Stephen Lynch (112th Congress)
9th	51.12%	48.88%	Bill Keating (113th Congress)

== Aftermath ==
A report by Common Cause found that the People's Pledge resulted in fewer attack ads on the airwaves. A People's Pledge was implemented in the Democratic primary for the 2013 Senate special election in Massachusetts and the Democratic primary for the 2014 Rhode Island gubernatorial election.

Less than two months after the election, President Barack Obama nominated Senator John Kerry to become United States Secretary of State. Kerry was sworn in on February 1, making newly inaugurated Warren the state's senior senator, and the Senate's most-junior senior senator. In the special election to replace Kerry the following year, Democratic nominee Ed Markey asked his Republican rival Gabriel E. Gomez to sign a similar pledge with him, although Gomez refused.

The election was a critical event in both candidates' political careers, with Warren becoming a political icon after entering the Senate. After rebuffing significant efforts to draft her into running for president in 2016, Warren ran for president in 2020. She was also shortlisted as a potential running mate by the Democratic presidential nominees in both 2016 and 2020. Warren was re-elected to the senate in 2018 and 2024. After the election loss, Brown remained considered the most prominent Republican in Massachusetts and was heavily anticipated to run again in Massachusetts in either the special Senate election the following year or for governor in 2014, though he declined to run in either. He instead moved to New Hampshire and ran for the Senate there in 2014 against Democratic incumbent Jeanne Shaheen. He lost, 51% to 48%, becoming the first male candidate to lose two Senate races to female candidates. In 2016, Brown was earliest former or current senator to endorse the ultimately-successful presidential campaign of Donald Trump, and served as ambassador to New Zealand and Samoa during Trump's first presidency. Brown ran again for New Hampshire's Senate seat in 2026 but lost the Republican primary to fellow former senator John E. Sununu, only receiving 26% of the vote to Sununu's 68%.

== See also ==
- 2012 United States Senate elections
- 2012 United States House of Representatives elections in Massachusetts
- 2013 United States Senate special election in Massachusetts
