= Mary Jane Fate =

Koyukon Athabascan activist (1933–2020)

- Fate in 2014
- Born: Mary Jane Evans; September 4, 1933; Rampart, Territory of Alaska
- Died: April 10, 2020 (aged 86); Fairbanks, Alaska
- Occupation: Native American activist
- Years active: 1962–2020
- Political party: Alaska Federation of Natives
- Spouse: Hugh Fate (m. 1954)
- Children: 3
- Relatives: Dan Sullivan (son-in-law)

Mary Jane Fate (née Evans; September 4, 1933 — April 10, 2020) was a Koyukon Athabascan activist. She was a founding member of the Fairbanks Native Association and the Institute of Alaska Native Arts and worked as a lobbyist for the Alaska Native Claims Settlement Act. She co-founded the Tundra Times newspaper and served as a director of the corporate board for Alaska Airlines for over two decades. She served as co-chair of the Alaska Federation of Natives between 1988 and 1989, the first woman to serve in the capacity, and was the third president and a founding member of the North American Indian Women's Association. Fate has served on various commissions and national studies of issues which affect indigenous people. She was the project manager of a study of women and disability, served as the only indigenous member of the U.S. Arctic Research Commission and was a member of U.S. Census Advisory Committee on indigenous populations. She has received numerous honors and awards for her activism on behalf of Native Americans and was inducted into the Alaska Women's Hall of Fame in 2014.

== Early life ==
Mary Jane Evans was born in 1933 in Rampart, in the United States Territory of Alaska, to Sally (née Woods, later Hudson) and Thomas George Evans, Jr. She was born into a subsistence life on the Yukon River, living with her family in tents in the winter during trapping season, fishing to survive in the summers. Her father was a trapper and mail carrier. After completing her primary education, Evans attended Bureau of Indian Affairs Boarding School Mount Edgecumbe in Sitka, as part of the US's Federal Indian Residential School policy. She graduated in 1952. She then went on to study accounting at the University of Alaska and simultaneously worked at Wien Alaska Airlines to pay her way through school. On October 29, 1954, she married Hugh Fate, Jr., who would become a dentist and Native American rights activist. The couple had three daughters, Janine, Jennifer and Julie. Their daughter Julie married United States Senator Dan Sullivan of Alaska. She raised her family in the Athabascan way, spending every summer at their subsistence fish camp on the Yukon River.

== Career ==
After her marriage, Fate returned to work at Wien Alaska Airlines. Fate and her husband were part of the founding members of the Fairbanks Native Association which organized in 1962 and 1963. Around the same time, she became involved in the Tundra Times, the first news organization written by and for Native Alaskans, which served not only to inform the community of important issues throughout the state, but the state's congressional leaders of those issues the indigenous population felt were imperative. Fate was on the executive board of the paper and also served as the secretary to the board for the newspaper.

Recognizing the limited educational opportunities for Native Alaskans, Fate became involved in the Fairbanks Native Association's education committee in 1962. She worked on a six-year study of the educational system to evaluate the reasons why education was substandard in Alaska. Fate testified at a state congressional hearing on their findings, showing that the majority of rural students either attended no high school or attended at inadequate facilities located long distances from their homes. The committee pressed for dormitories to be built for student housing in urban areas to enable students from rural areas to attend high schools. She served on the executive committee of the Native Alaskan Village for the Alaska 67 Centennial Exposition and worked on the Hospital Foundation of Fairbanks, before becoming involved in the Alaska Native claims settlement. Provisions of the Alaska Native Claims Settlement Act (ANCSA) for the first time gave indigenous villages both land and capital to invest in education. The settlement awarded 44 million acres of land and $962.5 million to allow Native Alaskans to establish twelve regional corporations to manage the assets. Fate became president of the Rampart Village Corporation, established in 1971 as one of those regional entities and worked to ensure that indigenous people enrolled to share in the settlement.

Fate was one of the founders of the North American Indian Women's Association (NAIWA) which formed in 1970 in Fort Collins, Colorado. The organization was the first pan-Indian group of indigenous women to organize with a national platform. In 1975, Fate became the third president of the NAIWA, succeeding Agnes Dill. and served until 1977. Concern over the health of Native Alaskans was also an issue for Fate, and in the 1970s, she both spoke at conferences regarding the problems and with Nancy Murkowski and others founded a Breast Cancer Detection Center in Fairbanks in 1975. She headed a federal program Special Needs of Handicapped Indian Children and Indian Women's Problems which began in 1977, to collect and collate data concerning child abuse, nutrition, physical and mental handicaps, rape, single parenting, and violence towards women. In addition, the program evaluated social service availability to deal with these types of issues, including assessment of the facilities and qualifications required for caregivers. In 1978, she participated in the national conference of Rural American Women Inc., held in Washington, D. C. The purpose of the meeting was to discuss problems faced by women, but specifically those, like isolation and lack of services, that compounded issues for women not living in urban centers.

In 1981 Fate was appointed to serve on the Alaska Judicial Council and served until 1987. She was elected as co-chair with Henry Ivanoff of the Alaska Federation of Natives between 1988 and 1989 and was the first woman to hold the post. In 1990, she was named to the Alaska Natives Commission and two years later was elected co-chair of the commission with Perry Eaton. The goal of the commission, part of the joint Federal-State Commission on Policies and Programs Effecting Alaska Natives, was to complete a two-year study and make recommendations for a strategic plan for governmental interaction with native populations. In 1991, Fate served on the transition team for governor-elect Wally Hickel and in 1993, was named to serve on the Board of Regents for the University of Alaska.

In 1998, Fate received the national Cancer Awareness Award from the Congressional Families Action for Cancer Awareness for her work in health care. She was named by President George H. W. Bush to serve on the United States Arctic Research Commission in 2001. The commission's purpose, was to establish national scientific research policy for the Arctic region, which was sensitive to residents and natural resources. Fate was the only Native American who served on the commission during her term which lasted until 2006. In 2003, she was appointed by President George W. Bush to serve on the U.S. Census Advisory Committee on American Indian and Alaska Native Populations. In 2012 Fate was honored by the Alaska Federation of Natives with two President's Awards, receiving both the Public Service Award and the Citizen of the Year Award, the highest honor the board bestows. She was inducted into the Alaska Women's Hall of Fame in 2014.

== See also ==
- List of Native American politicians
- Native American women in politics
