= Marie C. Cox =

Native American activist (1920–2005)

- 1971
- Born: Marie Cerday; January 17, 1920; Lawton, Oklahoma, U.S.
- Died: May 10, 2005 (aged 85); Midwest City, Oklahoma, U.S.
- Occupations: Native American, children's and women's rights activist
- Years active: 1970–1990
- Known for: founding the North American Indian Women's Association and foster care reform
- Spouse: James M. Cox (m. 1938)

Marie C. Cox (January 17, 1920 – May 10, 2005) was a Comanche activist who worked on legislation for Native American children. She received many accolades for her efforts including the 1974 Indian Leadership Award from the Bureau of Indian Affairs and state recognition that same year as the Outstanding Citizen of Oklahoma from Governor David Hall. She was named as an Outstanding Indian Woman of 1977 by the North American Indian Women's Association, and served on the National Advisory Council on Indian Education from 1983 to 1990. In 1993, she was inducted into the Oklahoma Women's Hall of Fame for her work with foster children and the founding of the North American Indian Women's Association.

== Early life ==
Marie Cerday was born on January 17, 1920, at the Lawton, Oklahoma Indian Hospital to Herlinda (née Portillo) and Dave Cerday. She attended the Ft. Sill Indian Boarding School and later went to Walters High School. Cerday went on to further her education, studying at Central State University in Edmond, Oklahoma. On June 6, 1938, in Lawton, Cerday married James M. Cox. James was the grandson of Chief Quanah Parker and later served as chair of the Comanche Nation.

== Years of activism ==
In 1970, Cox founded the North American Indian Women's Association (NAIWA) and served as its first national president. She identified the goals of the organization as improvement of home and community, healthcare and education, and intertribal communication, as well as cultural preservation and fellowship. It was one of the first national organizations of Native American women and sought intertribal solutions for women's issues. In 1971, the organization held its first conference in Ft. Sill, Oklahoma, followed a few months later by one in Albuquerque, New Mexico, establishing education as its focus for the coming year. Cox served as national president of the organization through 1973.

In the early 1970s, Cox began touring Native American communities throughout the United States collecting data on the needs of Indian children. She specifically focused on institutionalized children, who were part of the Foster Care System, in group homes, or those living in American Indian boarding schools. The study, conducted by the NAIWA and funded by the Bureau of Indian Affairs (BIA), was made for the U.S. Congress. In 1972, Cox served on the Health, Education and Welfare (HEW) Department's National Action for Foster Children Committee, which evaluated the care given to children under the program. She signed the Bill of Rights for Foster Children, drafted in 1973, which was ratified by Congress and attended the White House Conference on Mental Retardation. In 1974, she received the Indian Leadership Award from the BIA for her work as chair of the National Action for Foster Children Committee, drafting the Foster Children's Bill of Rights, and her direction of studies on how the BIA handled native children's care. That same year, she was recognized by Oklahoma Governor David Hall as the Outstanding Citizen of Oklahoma.

In 1975, Cox was a speaker in Window Rock, Arizona, at the Southwest Indian Women's Conference. More than 800 native women attended the conference, which looked at both political and cultural mechanisms that fostered discrimination against Native American women, but their goals were to empower women within their traditional tribal identity. In 1977, at a banquet hosted at the Chilocco Indian Agricultural School by the NAIWA, Cox was honored as the "Outstanding Indian Woman of 1977" for her work in establishing the NAIWA and with children's needs. That same year, she attended the NAIWA conference which was investigating the sterilization of Native American women by the Indian Health Service. Other issues examined included the provisions of the Indian Child Welfare Act, which had long been a focus for Cox.

In 1983, Cox was appointed by President Ronald Reagan to succeed Nadine Chase on the National Advisory Council on Indian Education. She was reappointed in 1985, 1987, and 1989, serving until she was replaced in 1990 by Terry Neese. In 1984, Cox was appointed to the board of the Child Welfare League of America and in 1988 she served as a member for the Oklahoma Indian Affairs Commission. In 1993, Cox was inducted into the Oklahoma Women's Hall of Fame and in 1999 she and her husband James were interviewed as part of the Museum of the Great Plains Oral History Project.

She died in Midwest City, Oklahoma, on May 10, 2005, aged 85.
