= Hugh Fate =

American politician (1929–2021)

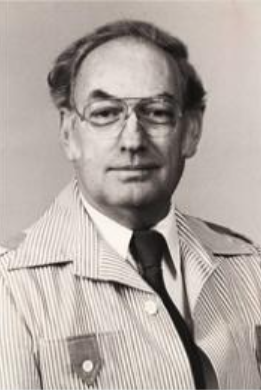
- Fate in the 1970s

Member of the Alaska House of Representatives from the 33rd district
- In office 2002–2005

Personal details
- Born: Hugh Berry Fate; December 4, 1929 Mountain View, California, U.S.
- Died: February 25, 2021 (aged 91) Fairbanks, Alaska, U.S.
- Party: Republican
- Spouse: Mary Jane Evans
- Relations: Dan Sullivan (son-in-law)
- Children: 3
- Education: University of Washington; University of Alaska; University of Oregon
- Occupation: Dentist, heavy equipment operator/oil driller, fisherman, real estate developer

Hugh Berry "Bud" Fate (December 4, 1929 – February 25, 2021) was an American politician and dentist in the state of Alaska.

== Early life and career ==
Fate was born in Mountain View, California. He graduated from La Grande High School in La Grande, Oregon in 1948. In 1951, he moved to Alaska, living in Fairbanks and Umiat. From 1951 to 1953, he served in the United States Army Signal Corps.

In addition to his career in politics and military service, Fate worked as a dentist, gold miner, carpenter, fisherman, dog musher, bush pilot, real estate developer, and author. In a speech on the floor of the U.S. Senate, his son-in-law Dan Sullivan referred to Fate as "an Alaskan renaissance man" and a "legend across Alaska." He was the chairman of the Fairbanks Chamber of Commerce.

== Political career ==
Fate represented Fairbanks in the Alaska House of Representatives from 2002 to 2005, serving as a Republican. Fate served as vice chair of the House Committees on Resources, State Affairs, Oil and Gas, and the Legislative Budget & Audit Committee. He additionally served on Finance subcommittees on Fish & Game, Transportation & Public Facilities, and Revenue.

Fate also served as vice chair of the Alaska Republican Party. Outside of office, he also served as the president of the University of Alaska Board of Regents, trustee of the University of Alaska Foundation, president of the Alaska State Board of Dental Examiners, chairman of the Alaska Land Use Council Advisory Committee, and member of the Alaska Local Boundary Commission.

== Family ==
He was married to Mary Jane Fate, an Athabascan leader. They had three daughters. Their daughter Julie is married to United States Senator Dan Sullivan of Alaska.
