= General Burns =

General Burns may refer to:

- E. L. M. Burns (1897–1985), Canadian Army lieutenant general
- George Burns (British Army officer) (1911–1997), British Army major general
- Joseph Burns (U.S. politician) (1800–1875), Ohio Militia major general
- Robert Whitney Burns (1908–1964), U.S. Air Force lieutenant general
- William F. Burns (1932–2021), U.S. Army major general
- William Wallace Burns (1825–1892), Union Army brigadier general

== See also ==
- Attorney General Burns (disambiguation)
