= John J. Burns (Alaska politician) =

American politician

28th Attorney General of Alaska
- In office December 2010 – 2 January 2012
- Governor: Sean Parnell
- Preceded by: Dan Sullivan
- Succeeded by: Michael Geraghty

Personal details
- Education: University of Alaska (BA); Seattle University (JD)

John J. Burns (born 1959) is an American politician who served as the Attorney General of Alaska from 2010 to 2012. He was appointed by Sean Parnell in December 2010 and resigned on 2 January 2012.
