= North American Indian Women's Association =

The North American Indian Women's Association (NAIWA) is a non-profit educational and service association, which seeks to promote intertribal communications, betterment of home, family life and community, betterment of health and education, awareness of Indian cultures, and fellowship among North American Indian people. NAIWA was founded in the summer of 1970 and was the first national Native American women's group. Marie Cox (Comanche), from Midwest City, Oklahoma, served as founding president at the inaugural meeting, which was held in Fort Collins, Colorado. During the 1970s adoption reform was one of its greatest concerns. Cox's presidency was followed by Agnes Dill of the Isleta Pueblo in New Mexico in 1973, who was in turn succeeded by Mary Jane Fate (Koyukon Athabaskan) from Fairbanks, Alaska, in 1975. Only women from federally recognized Indian tribes can be members.

The association named Muriel Hazel Wright the outstanding Indian woman of the 20th century in 1971.
