= Stuart Rothenberg =

American writer and political analyst

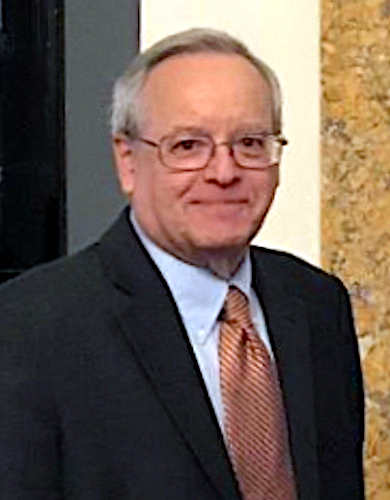
- Rothenberg in 2018
- Born: 1948 (age 77–78)
- Occupation: Writer, editor, analyst
- Education: Colby College; University of Connecticut
- Subject: Politics
- Notable works: Inside Elections newsletter

Stuart Rothenberg (born 1948) is an American editor, publisher, and political analyst. He is best known for his biweekly political newsletter The Rothenberg Political Report, now known as Inside Elections. He was also a regular columnist at Roll Call and an occasional op-ed contributor to other publications, including The Wall Street Journal, The Washington Post, The New York Times, and the Orlando Sentinel.

== Biography ==
Rothenberg lived in Waterville, Maine, while attending Colby College before relocating to Connecticut to earn his Ph.D. at the University of Connecticut. For a time, he settled in Lewisburg, Pennsylvania, to teach political science at Bucknell University. He also taught at the Catholic University of America.

In addition to his writing, he has been frequently featured in news broadcasts and worked with CNN as a political analyst for over ten years. He has served as a political analyst for CBS News and Voice of America. He is also a guest contributor for Political Wire.

Rothenberg is known for his prediction in early 2009 that the GOP's chances of winning back the U.S. House of Representatives in 2010 were "zero". Rothenberg later would change his prediction as the economy worsened and polls reflected increasing support for Republicans through the Tea Party protests. The Rothenberg Political Report projected Republicans would gain 55–65 seats in the House of Representatives (they gained 63) and 6–8 seats in the Senate (they gained 6).

In 2016, the weeks before the election of Donald Trump as U.S. President, Rothenberg wrote an opinion piece for The Washington Post headlined "Trump's path to an electoral college victory isn't narrow. It's nonexistent". Rothenberg stated, "Pennsylvania, Michigan and Wisconsin, once part of the Trump scenario, have never been 'in play'". Trump would go on to win all three of the battleground states.

In 2015, the Rothenberg Political Report changed its name to The Rothenberg & Gonzales Political Report, with long-time collaborator Nathan Gonzales taking over as editor and publisher. In 2017, the publication was renamed to Inside Elections with Nathan L. Gonzales. Despite the name change, Rothenberg continued to work with Inside Elections as a senior editor.

Rothenberg is married and the father of two children. He is currently a resident of Potomac, Maryland.
