= People's Pledge (United States) =

United States people's pledge

The People's Pledge is a formal campaign finance agreement between all candidates and their campaigns in a given election. It aims to reduce non-party group spending in an election by limiting expenditures to candidates’ campaigns and party committees. The Pledge requires candidates to pay a penalty if outside spending groups spend on behalf of their campaign. Outside spending is defined as any independent expenditure by a non-party group to benefit a candidate.

The People's Pledge was developed by Sen. Elizabeth Warren and Sen. Scott Brown during the 2012 U.S. Senate election in Massachusetts. The candidates publicly called on outside groups to stop spending in support of either candidate. They then agreed to pay a penalty equal to half the amount of any outside expenditure from their campaign account to a charity of the opponent's choice.

In the 2012 U.S Senate election in Massachusetts, the Pledge significantly reduced outside spending. People's Pledges have been implemented in 2014 primary elections and proposed in numerous federal races. Common Cause, Public Citizen Common Cause, Public Campaign Action Fund, and the Public Interest Research Group launched a campaign to promote the People's Pledge in the 2014 election cycle.

In addition to the 2012 U.S. Senate election in Massachusetts, a People's Pledge was implemented in the Democratic primary for the 2013 U.S. Senate election in Massachusetts and the Democratic primary for the 2014 gubernatorial election in Rhode Island. The Pledge has been proposed by at least one candidate in the 2012 U.S. Senate election in Maine, the 2013 mayoral election in Los Angeles and the 2014 U.S. Senate elections in Kentucky, New Hampshire, and Alaska.
