= Political Wire =

Political blog in the US

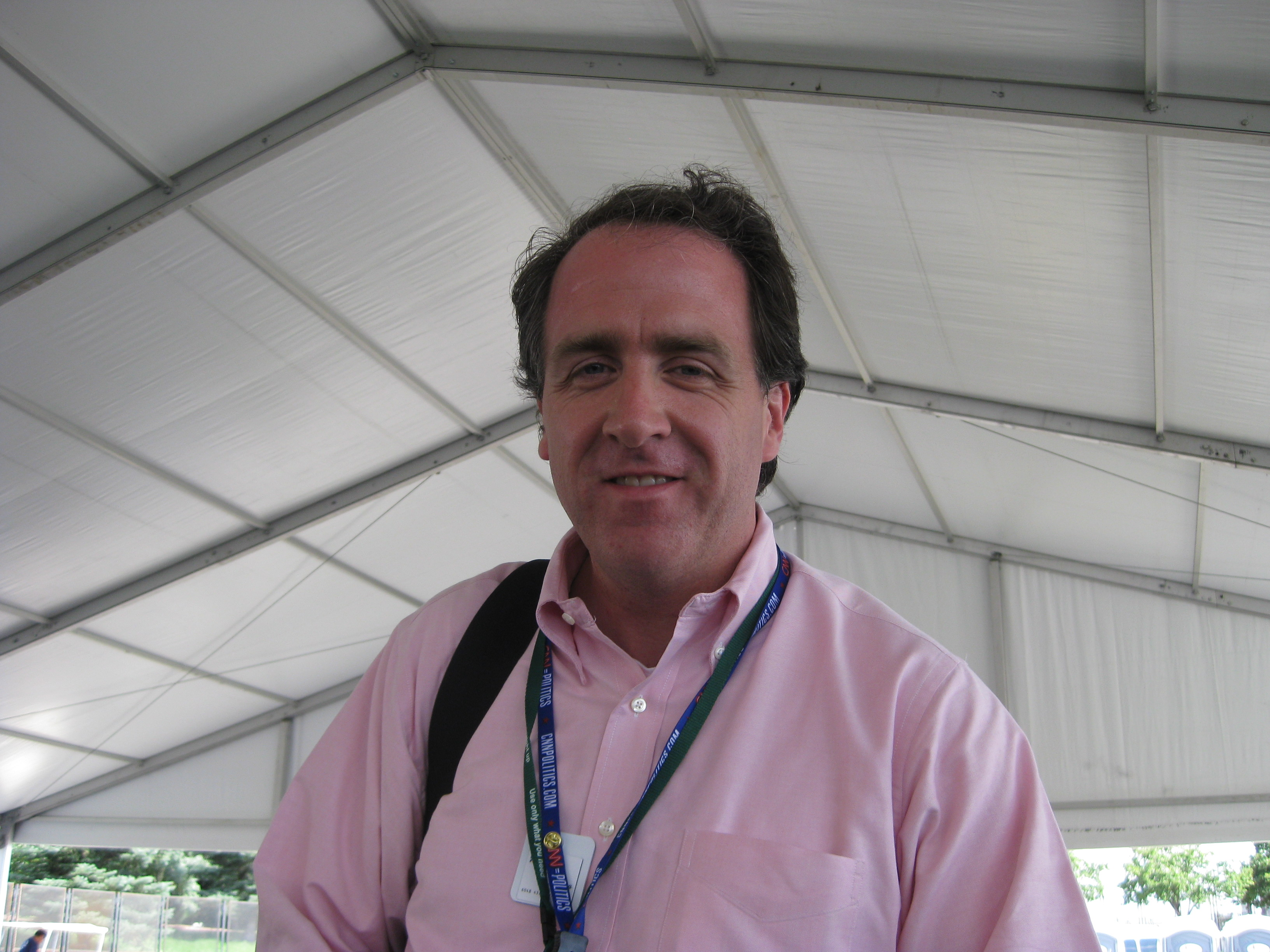
Taegan Goddard in 2008

Political Wire is an American political blog. It was founded in 1999 and published by Taegan (/ˈteɪɡən/) Goddard, a former policy adviser to Democratic U.S. Senator Donald Riegle and Independent Governor Lowell Weicker, and the co-author of the 1998 political management book You Won: Now What? How Americans Can Make Democracy Work from City Hall to the White House with political commentator Chris Riback.

== History ==
As the son of a lawyer, teacher and writer, Goddard grew up in a household that regularly discussed politics and the role of journalists in communicating the behind the scenes workings of the government. He further cultivated that interest at Vassar College and the Harvard Kennedy School.

He was inspired to create Political Wire by a print Wall Street Journal column called Washington Wire. In an interview with PR Week, called Making it in the Political Blogosphere Goddard explained why he created the site: "I do it for the same people who, going back a dozen years, always wanted that political page. So, in a practical sense, it’s for people who’re very similar to me, who like politics to the same degree that I do and also enjoy it almost as a game. While some people might read the sports page first every day, there’s a whole group of people who read Political Wire first every day, because that’s something that gets them going in the morning. Those people, I find, are professionally employed in politics or public affairs. They work either in political offices or on campaigns, or are elected and appointed officials themselves. In many cases they’re journalists who cover politics and, obviously, there are also the political junkies out there who just find it interesting."

Blog topics are typically drawn from a curated list of writers rather than websites although left and right sources including the Democratic forum Daily Kos and the conservative blog Hot Air provide additional perspectives.

== Readership ==
Although Political Wire is officially non-partisan, its readers are predominantly left leaning.The people who read Political Wire tend to be the political insiders and political junkies, the lawmakers and their staffs, journalists, and people who make a living in the world of public affairs." It is a subscription service with a nominal fee for membership, though most of the content is accessible for free.

By 2016, it was attracting upwards of ten million readers per month. Goddard told Fishbowl DC that people sometimes get confused by his politics because he's fiercely independent in his views and "not a joiner by nature."

== In the media ==
In 2006, Goddard formed a content partnership with Congressional Quarterly. The partnership was expanded in early 2009 so that CQ sold all advertising on Political Wire. The agreement expired in 2013 and the site is still owned and published by Goddard.

During the 2008 presidential election, PC Magazine named Political Wire one of the 20 best political web sites of 2008. In 2012, Time named @politicalwire as one of the top Twitter 140 Twitter feeds. Political Wire's Twitter site has also received acclaim outside the country and was named one of the "Top 50 US Politics Twitter Accounts to Follow."

The site has also been praised by political analysts such as Chuck Todd, Stuart Rothenberg, Charlie Cook and Larry Sabato.

Goddard has appeared as a guest to discuss political headlines on The Daily Beast and MSNBC. He has been a panelist for numerous political roundtables.

== Related sites ==
Goddard also created Taegan Goddard's Wonk Wire, a site focused on the latest public policy news, Taegan Goddard's Political Dictionary, which explores the language of politics, as well as Taegan Goddard's Political Job Hunt, which helps people interested in working in politics and public affairs. On January 13, 2013, Goddard agreed to maintain a daily blog for The Week, titled The Cloakroom.

One of Goddard's newest projects has been a new portal for examining possible future Presidential election outcomes called Electoral Vote Map.
