= 2016 United States House of Representatives elections in Massachusetts =

- November 8, 2016

All 9 Massachusetts seats to the United States House of Representatives
	Majority party	Minority party
Party	Democratic	Republican
Last election	9	0
Seats won	9	0
Seat change	Steady	Steady
Popular vote	2,344,518	451,121
Percentage	79.73%	15.34%
Swing	▼1.72%	▼1.70%

Democratic
40–50%
50–60%
60–70%
70–80%
80–90%
90–100%
Republican
40–50%

The 2016 United States House of Representatives elections in Massachusetts were held on November 8, 2016, electing the nine U.S. representatives from the Commonwealth of Massachusetts, one from each of the state's nine congressional districts. The elections coincided with the 2016 U.S. presidential election, as well as other elections to the House of Representatives, elections to the United States Senate and various state and local elections. The primaries were held on September 8. All incumbents were re-elected to office.

== Overview ==
=== Statewide ===
Popular vote
Democratic	79.73%
Republican	15.34%
Other	4.93%

House seats
Democratic	100.00%
Republican	0.00%

=== By district ===
Results of the 2016 United States House of Representatives elections in Massachusetts by district:

District	Democratic		Republican		Others		Total		Result
District	Votes	%	Votes	%	Votes	%	Votes	%	Result
District 1	235,803	73.34%	0	0.00%	85,736	26.66%	321,539	100.0%	Democratic hold
District 2	275,487	98.24%	0	0.00%	4,924	1.76%	280,411	100.0%	Democratic hold
District 3	236,713	68.69%	107,519	31.20%	360	0.10%	344,592	100.0%	Democratic hold
District 4	265,823	70.10%	113,055	29.81%	335	0.09%	379,213	100.0%	Democratic hold
District 5	285,606	98.55%	0	0.00%	4,201	1.45%	289,807	100.0%	Democratic hold
District 6	308,923	98.37%	0	0.00%	5,132	1.63%	314,055	100.0%	Democratic hold
District 7	253,354	98.62%	0	0.00%	3,557	1.38%	256,911	100.0%	Democratic hold
District 8	271,019	72.41%	102,744	27.45%	502	0.13%	374,265	100.0%	Democratic hold
District 9	211,790	55.75%	127,803	33.64%	40,302	10.61%	379,895	100.0%	Democratic hold
Total	2,344,518	79.73%	451,121	15.34%	145,049	4.93%	2,940,688	100.0%	

== District 1 ==
2016 Massachusetts's 1st congressional district election
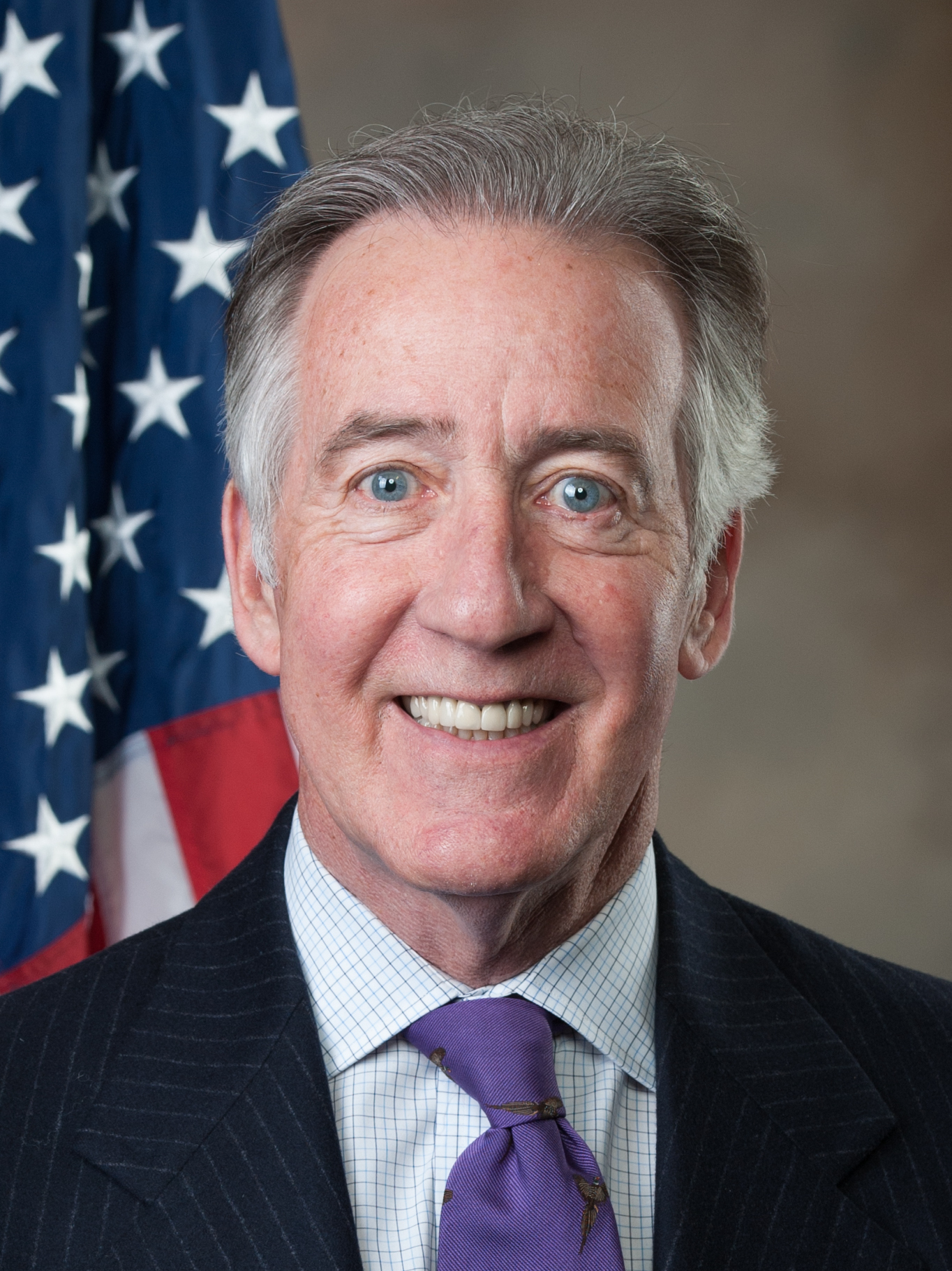

Nominee	Richard Neal	Frederick Mayock	Thomas Simmons
Party	Democratic	Independent	Libertarian
Popular vote	235,803	57,504	27,511
Percentage	73.3%	17.9%	8.6%
- Neal: 50–60% 60–70% 70–80% 80–90% >90%
U.S. Representative before election
Richard Neal
Democratic
Elected U.S. Representative
Richard Neal
Democratic

The 1st congressional district is located in western and central Massachusetts. The largest Massachusetts district in area, it covers about one-third of the state and is more rural than the rest. It has the state's highest point, Mount Greylock. The district includes the cities of Springfield, West Springfield, Pittsfield, Holyoke, and Westfield. Incumbent Democrat Richard Neal, who has represented the district since 2013 and previously represented the 2nd district from 1989 to 2013, ran for re-election. He was re-elected unopposed with 98% of the vote in 2014 and the district had a PVI of D+13.

=== Democratic primary ===
==== Candidates ====
===== Nominee =====
- Richard Neal, incumbent U.S. Representative

==== Results ====
Democratic primary results
Party	Candidate	Votes	%
Democratic	Richard Neal (incumbent)	44,857	98.5
Write-in		706	1.5
Total votes		45,563	100.0

=== Republican primary ===
No Republicans filed

=== Libertarian primary ===
==== Candidates ====
===== Nominee =====
- Thomas Simmons, professor of business and economics at Greenfield Community College

=== Independents ===
- Frederick Mayock

=== General election ===
==== Predictions ====
Source	Ranking	As of
The Cook Political Report	Safe D	November 7, 2016
Daily Kos Elections	Safe D	November 7, 2016
Rothenberg	Safe D	November 3, 2016
Sabato's Crystal Ball	Safe D	November 7, 2016
RCP	Safe D	October 31, 2016

==== Results ====
Massachusetts's 1st congressional district, 2016
Party	Candidate	Votes	%
Democratic	Richard Neal (incumbent)	235,803	73.3
Independent	Frederick O. Mayock	57,504	17.9
Libertarian	Thomas T. Simmons	27,511	8.6
Write-in		721	0.2
Total votes		321,539	100.0
Democratic hold			

== District 2 ==
2016 Massachusetts's 2nd congressional district election
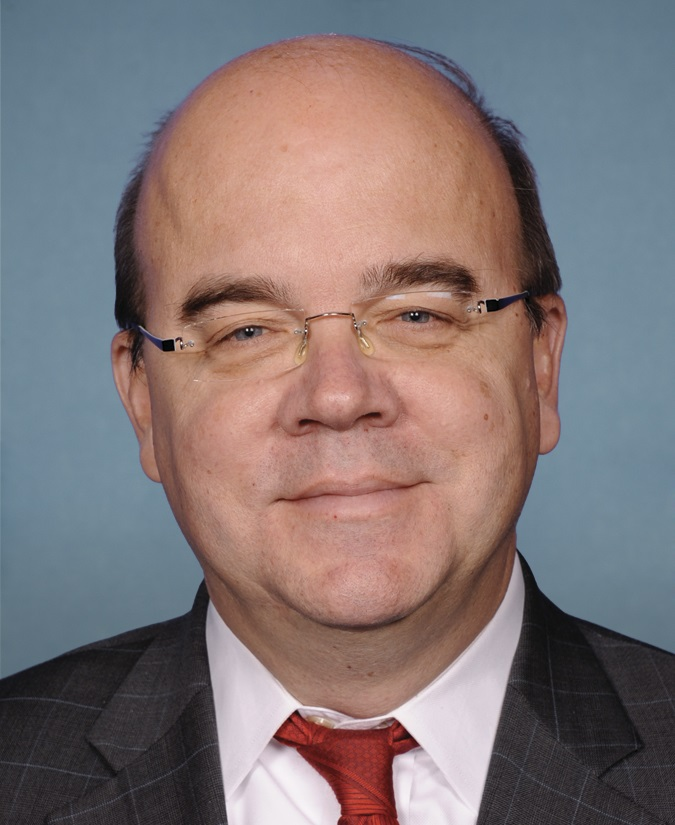
Nominee	Jim McGovern
Party	Democratic
Popular vote	275,487
Percentage	98.2%
U.S. Representative before election
Jim McGovern
Democratic
Elected U.S. Representative
Jim McGovern
Democratic

The 2nd congressional district is located in central Massachusetts. It contains the cities of Worcester, which is the second-largest city in New England after Boston, and Northampton in the Pioneer Valley. Incumbent Democrat Jim McGovern, who has represented the district since 2013 and previously represented the 3rd district from 1997 to 2013, ran for re-election. He was re-elected unopposed with 98% of the vote in 2014 and the district had a PVI of D+8.

=== Democratic primary ===
==== Candidates ====
===== Nominee =====
- Jim McGovern, incumbent U.S. Representative

==== Results ====
Democratic primary results
Party	Candidate	Votes	%
Democratic	Jim McGovern (Incumbent)	21,562	99.2
Write-in		166	0.8
Total votes		21,728	100.0

=== Republican primary ===
No Republicans filed

=== General election ===
==== Predictions ====
Source	Ranking	As of
The Cook Political Report	Safe D	November 7, 2016
Daily Kos Elections	Safe D	November 7, 2016
Rothenberg	Safe D	November 3, 2016
Sabato's Crystal Ball	Safe D	November 7, 2016
RCP	Safe D	October 31, 2016

==== Results ====
Massachusetts's 2nd congressional district, 2016
Party	Candidate	Votes	%
Democratic	Jim McGovern (incumbent)	275,487	98.2
Write-in		4,924	1.8
Total votes		280,411	100.0
Democratic hold			

== District 3 ==
2016 Massachusetts's 3rd congressional district election
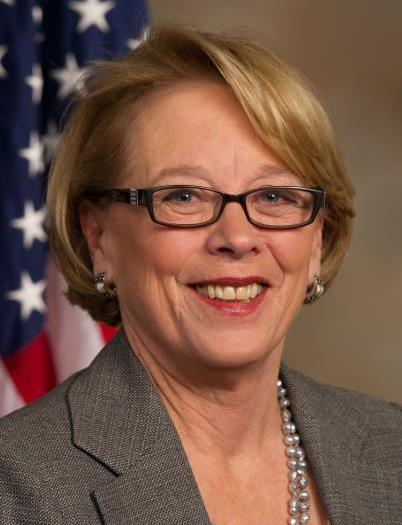

Nominee	Niki Tsongas	Ann Wofford
Party	Democratic	Republican
Popular vote	236,713	107,519
Percentage	68.7%	31.2%
- Tsongas: 50–60% 60–70% 70–80% 80–90% >90% Wofford: 50–60%
U.S. Representative before election
Niki Tsongas
Democratic
Elected U.S. Representative
Niki Tsongas
Democratic

The 3rd congressional district is located in northeastern and central Massachusetts. It contains the Merrimack valley including Lowell, Lawrence and Haverhill. The incumbent is Democrat Niki Tsongas, who has represented the district since 2013 and previously represented the 5th district from 2007 to 2013. She was re-elected with 63% of the vote in 2014 and the district has a PVI of D+6.

=== Democratic primary ===
==== Candidates ====
===== Nominee =====
- Niki Tsongas, incumbent U.S. Representative

==== Results ====
Democratic primary results
Party	Candidate	Votes	%
Democratic	Niki Tsongas (incumbent)	21,047	98.6
Write-in		291	1.4
Total votes		21,338	100.0

=== Republican primary ===
==== Candidates ====
===== Nominee =====
- Ann Wofford, nominee for this seat in 2014

==== Results ====
Republican primary results
Party	Candidate	Votes	%
Republican	Ann Wofford	5,774	99.1
Write-in		54	0.9
Total votes		5,828	100.0

=== General election ===
==== Predictions ====
Source	Ranking	As of
The Cook Political Report	Safe D	November 7, 2016
Daily Kos Elections	Safe D	November 7, 2016
Rothenberg	Safe D	November 3, 2016
Sabato's Crystal Ball	Safe D	November 7, 2016
RCP	Safe D	October 31, 2016

==== Results ====
Massachusetts's 3rd congressional district, 2016
Party	Candidate	Votes	%
Democratic	Niki Tsongas (incumbent)	236,713	68.7
Republican	Ann Wofford	107,519	31.2
Write-in		360	0.1
Total votes		344,592	100.0
Democratic hold			

== District 4 ==
2016 Massachusetts's 4th congressional district election
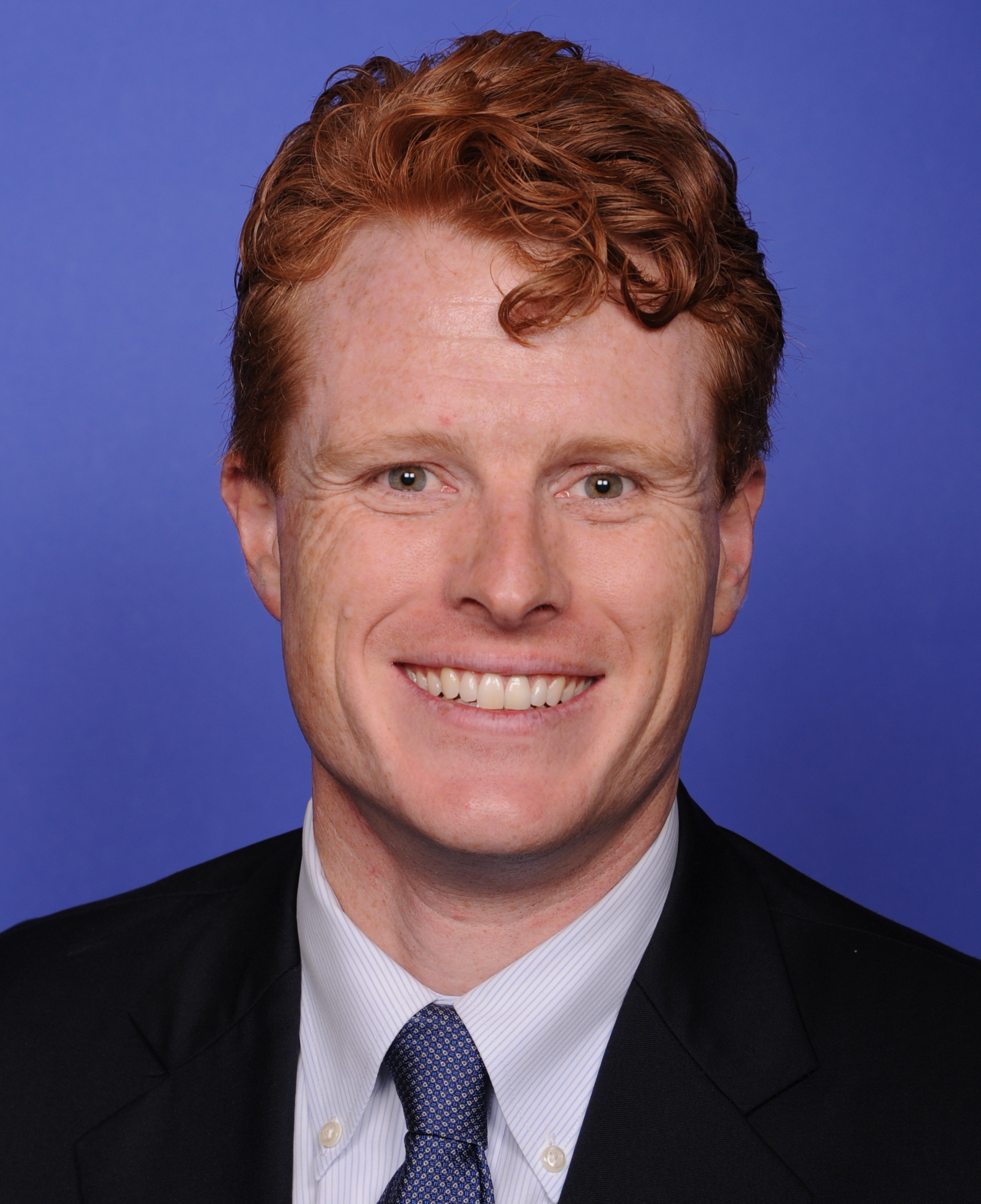

Nominee	Joe Kennedy III	David Rosa
Party	Democratic	Republican
Popular vote	265,823	113,055
Percentage	70.1%	29.8%
- Kennedy: 50–60% 60–70% 70–80% 80–90% >90%
U.S. Representative before election
Joe Kennedy III
Democratic
Elected U.S. Representative
Joe Kennedy III
Democratic

The 4th congressional district is located mostly in southern Massachusetts. It contains Bristol, Middlesex, Norfolk, Plymouth and Worcester counties. Incumbent Democrat Joseph P. Kennedy III, who had represented the district since 2013, ran for re-election. He was elected with 98% of the vote in 2014 and the district had a PVI of D+6.

=== Democratic primary ===
==== Candidates ====
===== Nominee =====
- Joseph P. Kennedy III, incumbent U.S. Representative

==== Results ====
Democratic primary results
Party	Candidate	Votes	%
Democratic	Joseph P. Kennedy III (incumbent)	15,849	98.7
Write-in		216	1.3
Total votes		16,065	100.0

=== Republican primary ===
==== Candidates ====
===== Nominee =====
- David Rosa

==== Results ====
Republican primary results
Party	Candidate	Votes	%
Republican	David A. Rosa	4,299	98.0
Write-in		87	2.0
Total votes		4,386	100.0

=== General election ===
==== Predictions ====
Source	Ranking	As of
The Cook Political Report	Safe D	November 7, 2016
Daily Kos Elections	Safe D	November 7, 2016
Rothenberg	Safe D	November 3, 2016
Sabato's Crystal Ball	Safe D	November 7, 2016
RCP	Safe D	October 31, 2016

==== Results ====
Massachusetts's 4th congressional district, 2016
Party	Candidate	Votes	%
Democratic	Joseph P. Kennedy III (incumbent)	265,823	70.1
Republican	David A. Rosa	113,055	29.8
Write-in		335	0.1
Total votes		379,213	100.0
Democratic hold			

== District 5 ==
2016 Massachusetts's 5th congressional district election
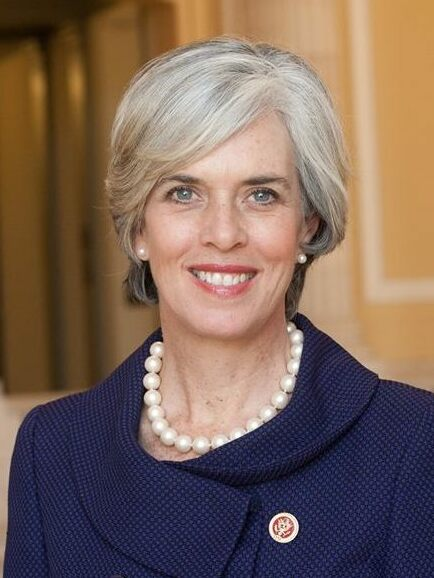
Nominee	Katherine Clark
Party	Democratic
Popular vote	285,606
Percentage	98.6%
U.S. Representative before election
Katherine Clark
Democratic
Elected U.S. Representative
Katherine Clark
Democratic

The 5th congressional district is located in eastern Massachusetts. It contains Middlesex, Suffolk and Worcester counties. Incumbent Democrat Katherine Clark, who had represented the district since 2013, ran for re-election. She was re-elected with 98% of the vote in 2014 and the district had a PVI of D+14.

=== Democratic primary ===
==== Candidates ====
===== Nominee =====
- Katherine Clark, incumbent U.S. Representative

==== Results ====
Democratic primary results
Party	Candidate	Votes	%
Democratic	Katherine Clark (incumbent)	30,066	98.5
Write-in		455	1.5
Total votes		30,521	100.0

=== Republican primary ===
No Republicans filed

=== General election ===
==== Predictions ====
Source	Ranking	As of
The Cook Political Report	Safe D	November 7, 2016
Daily Kos Elections	Safe D	November 7, 2016
Rothenberg	Safe D	November 3, 2016
Sabato's Crystal Ball	Safe D	November 7, 2016
RCP	Safe D	October 31, 2016

==== Results ====
Massachusetts's 5th congressional district, 2016
Party	Candidate	Votes	%
Democratic	Katherine Clark (Incumbent)	285,606	98.6
Write-in		4,201	1.4
Total votes		289,807	100.0
Democratic hold			

== District 6 ==
2016 Massachusetts's 6th congressional district election
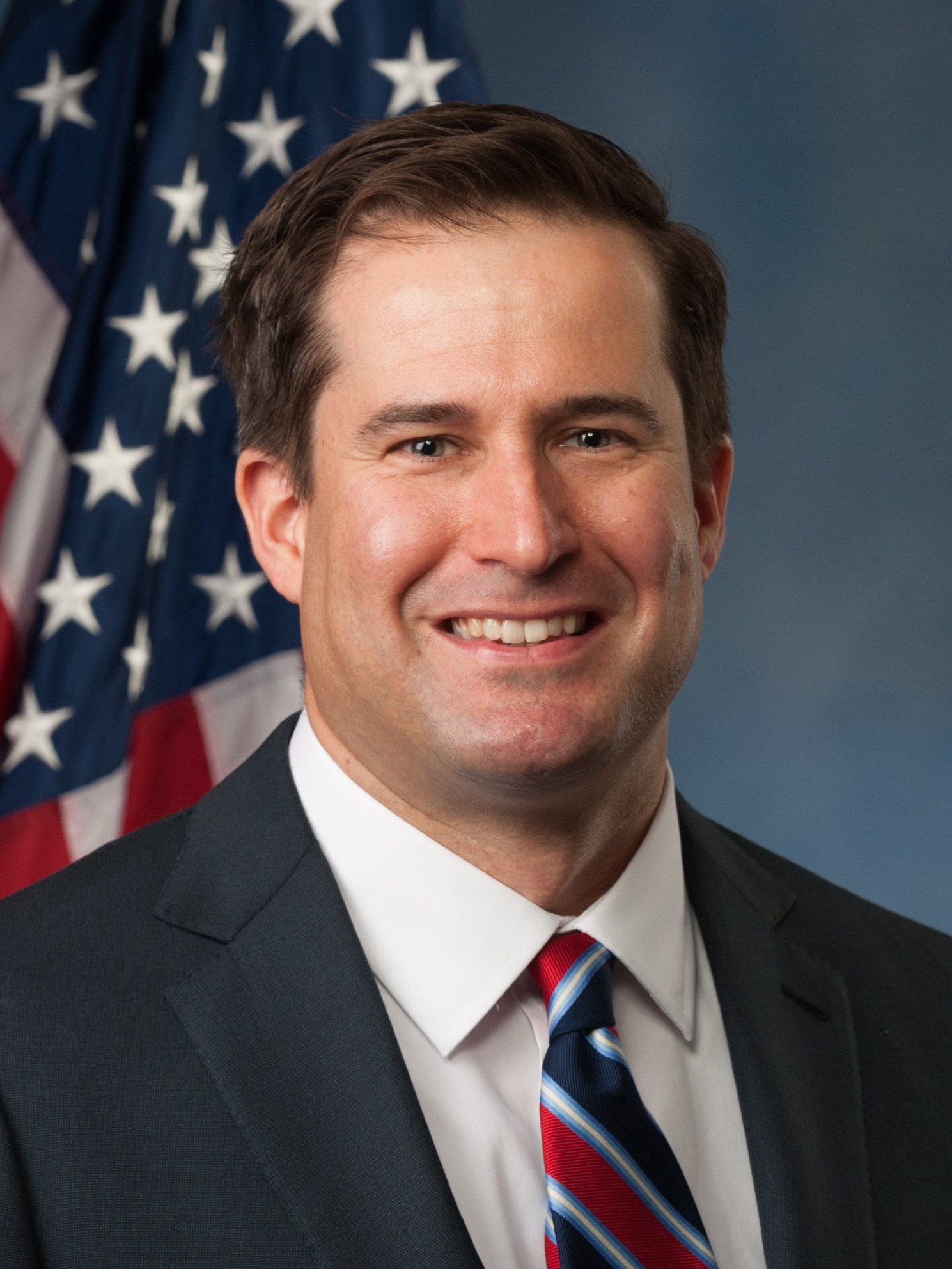
Nominee	Seth Moulton
Party	Democratic
Popular vote	308,923
Percentage	98.4%
U.S. Representative before election
Seth Moulton
Democratic
Elected U.S. Representative
Seth Moulton
Democratic

The 6th congressional district is located in northeastern Massachusetts. It contains most of Essex County, including the North Shore and Cape Ann. Incumbent Democrat Seth Moulton, who had represented the district since 2015, ran for re-election. He was elected with 55% of the vote in 2014 and the district had a PVI of D+4.

=== Democratic primary ===
==== Candidates ====
===== Nominee =====
- Seth Moulton, incumbent U.S. Representative

==== Results ====
Democratic primary results
Party	Candidate	Votes	%
Democratic	Seth Moulton (incumbent)	28,206	99.1
Write-in		267	0.9
Total votes		28,473	100.0

=== Republican primary ===
No Republicans filed

=== General election ===
==== Predictions ====
Source	Ranking	As of
The Cook Political Report	Safe D	November 7, 2016
Daily Kos Elections	Safe D	November 7, 2016
Rothenberg	Safe D	November 3, 2016
Sabato's Crystal Ball	Safe D	November 7, 2016
RCP	Safe D	October 31, 2016

==== Results ====
Massachusetts's 6th congressional district, 2016
Party	Candidate	Votes	%
Democratic	Seth Moulton (incumbent)	308,923	98.4
Write-in		5,132	1.6
Total votes		314,055	100.0
Democratic hold			

== District 7 ==
2016 Massachusetts's 7th congressional district election
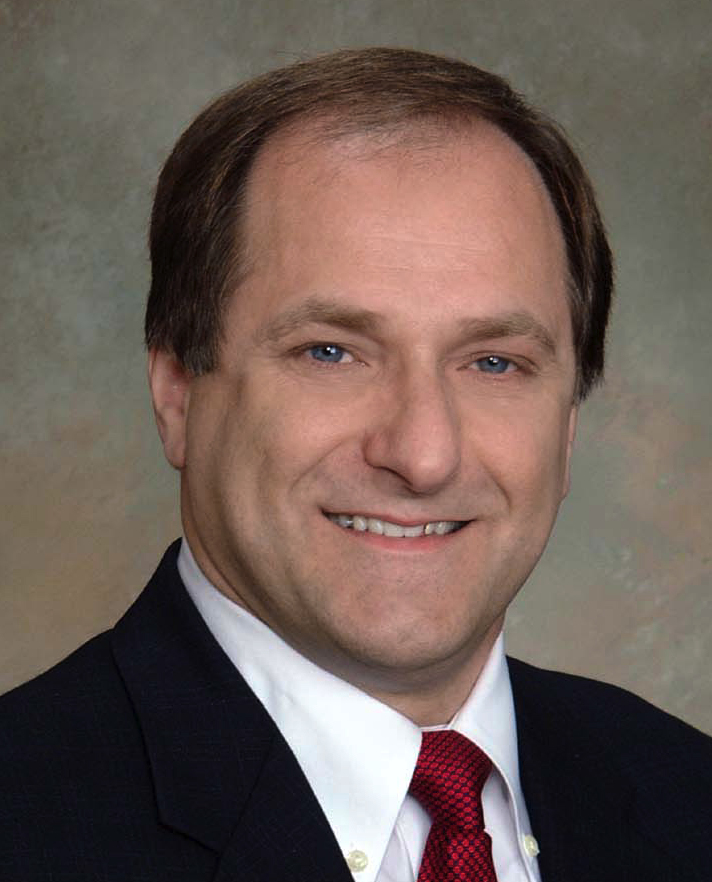
Nominee	Mike Capuano
Party	Democratic
Popular vote	253,354
Percentage	98.6%
U.S. Representative before election
Mike Capuano
Democratic
Elected U.S. Representative
Mike Capuano
Democratic

The 7th congressional district is located in eastern Massachusetts. It contains the northern three-quarters of the city of Boston, the city of Somerville and parts of the city of Cambridge. Incumbent Democrat Mike Capuano, who had represented the district since 2013 and previously represented the 8th district from 1999 to 2013, ran for re-election. He was re-elected with 98% of the vote in 2014 and the district had a PVI of D+31.

=== Democratic primary ===
==== Candidates ====
===== Nominee =====
- Mike Capuano, incumbent U.S. Representative

==== Results ====
Democratic primary results
Party	Candidate	Votes	%
Democratic	Mike Capuano (Incumbent)	37,547	98.3
Write-in		666	1.7
Total votes		38,213	100.0

=== Republican primary ===
No Republicans filed

=== General election ===
==== Predictions ====
Source	Ranking	As of
The Cook Political Report	Safe D	November 7, 2016
Daily Kos Elections	Safe D	November 7, 2016
Rothenberg	Safe D	November 3, 2016
Sabato's Crystal Ball	Safe D	November 7, 2016
RCP	Safe D	October 31, 2016

==== Results ====
Massachusetts's 7th congressional district, 2016
Party	Candidate	Votes	%
Democratic	Mike Capuano (incumbent)	253,354	98.6
Write-in		3,557	1.4
Total votes		256,911	100.0
Democratic hold			

== District 8 ==
2016 Massachusetts's 8th congressional district election
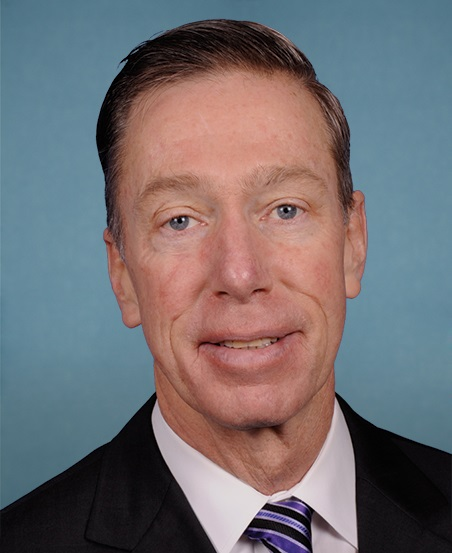

Nominee	Stephen Lynch	William Burke
Party	Democratic	Republican
Popular vote	271,019	102,744
Percentage	72.4%	27.5%
- Lynch: 50–60% 60–70% 70–80% 80–90% >90%
U.S. Representative before election
Stephen Lynch
Democratic
Elected U.S. Representative
Stephen Lynch
Democratic

The 8th congressional district is located in eastern Massachusetts. It contains the southern quarter of the city of Boston and many of its southern suburbs. Incumbent Democrat Stephen Lynch, who had represented the district since 2013 and previously represented the 9th district from 2001 to 2013. He was re-elected with 99% of the vote in 2014 and the district had a PVI of D+6.

=== Democratic primary ===
==== Candidates ====
===== Nominee =====
- Stephen Lynch, incumbent U.S. Representative

==== Results ====
Democratic primary results
Party	Candidate	Votes	%
Democratic	Stephen Lynch (incumbent)	27,335	97.4
Write-in		737	2.6
Total votes		28,072	100.0

=== Republican primary ===
==== Candidates ====
===== Nominee =====
- William Burke, small business owner

==== Results ====
Republican primary results
Party	Candidate	Votes	%
Republican	William Burke	5,856	95.3
Write-in		291	4.7
Total votes		6,147	100.0

=== General election ===
==== Predictions ====
Source	Ranking	As of
The Cook Political Report	Safe D	November 7, 2016
Daily Kos Elections	Safe D	November 7, 2016
Rothenberg	Safe D	November 3, 2016
Sabato's Crystal Ball	Safe D	November 7, 2016
RCP	Safe D	October 31, 2016

==== Results ====
Massachusetts's 8th congressional district, 2016
Party	Candidate	Votes	%
Democratic	Stephen Lynch (incumbent)	271,019	72.4
Republican	William Burke	102,744	27.5
Write-in		502	0.1
Total votes		374,265	100.0
Democratic hold			

== District 9 ==
2016 Massachusetts's 9th congressional district election
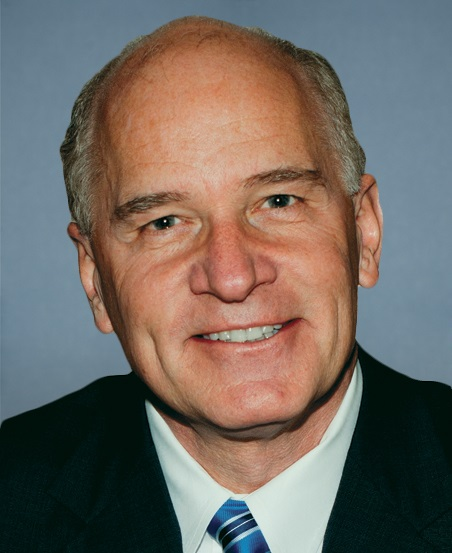

Nominee	Bill Keating	Mark Alliegro	Paul Harrington
Party	Democratic	Republican	Independent
Popular vote	211,790	127,803	26,233
Percentage	55.8%	33.6%	6.9%
- Keating: 40–50% 50–60% 60–70% 70–80% 80–90% Alliegro: 40–50%
U.S. Representative before election
Bill Keating
Democratic
Elected U.S. Representative
Bill Keating
Democratic

The 9th congressional district is located in eastern Massachusetts, including Cape Cod and the South Coast. It contains all of Barnstable, Dukes and Nantucket counties and parts of Bristol and Plymouth counties. Incumbent Democrat Bill Keating, who has represented the district since 2013 and previously represented the 10th district from 2011 to 2013, ran for re-election. He was re-elected with 55% of the vote in 2014 and the district has a PVI of D+5.

=== Democratic primary ===
==== Candidates ====
===== Nominee =====
- Bill Keating, incumbent U.S. Representative

==== Results ====
Democratic primary results
Party	Candidate	Votes	%
Democratic	Bill Keating (incumbent)	31,074	99.3
Write-in		215	0.7
Total votes		31,289	100.0

=== Republican primary ===
==== Candidates ====
===== Nominee =====
- Mark Alliegro, biologist, educator and candidate for this seat in 2014

===== Eliminated in primary =====
- Tom O'Malley, retired U.S. Navy officer

==== Results ====
Republican primary results
Party	Candidate	Votes	%
Republican	Mark C. Alliegro	12,467	61.9
Republican	Thomas Joseph O'Malley, Jr	7,632	37.9
Write-in		55	0.2
Total votes		20,154	100.0

=== General election ===
==== Predictions ====
Source	Ranking	As of
The Cook Political Report	Safe D	November 7, 2016
Daily Kos Elections	Safe D	November 7, 2016
Rothenberg	Safe D	November 3, 2016
Sabato's Crystal Ball	Safe D	November 7, 2016
RCP	Safe D	October 31, 2016

==== Results ====
Massachusetts's 9th congressional district, 2016
Party	Candidate	Votes	%
Democratic	Bill Keating (incumbent)	211,790	55.8
Republican	Mark C. Alliegro	127,803	33.6
Independent	Paul J. Harrington	26,233	6.9
Independent	Christopher D. Cataldo	8,338	2.2
Independent	Anna Grace Raduc	5,320	1.4
Write-in		411	0.1
Total votes		379,895	100.0
Democratic hold			
