= Joe Kennedy III =

American politician (born 1980)

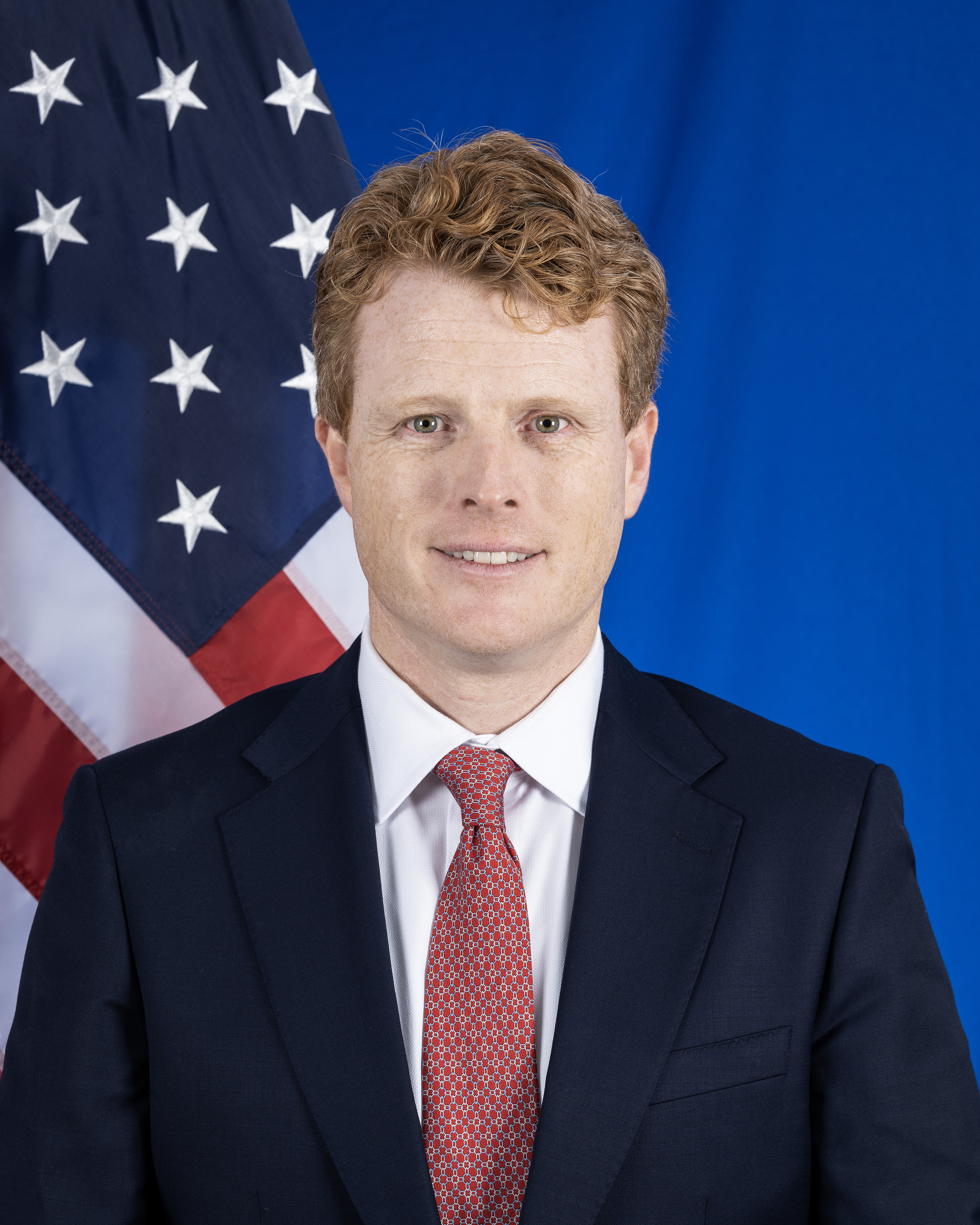
- Official portrait, 2023

United States Special Envoy for Northern Ireland
- In office December 19, 2022 – December 13, 2024
- President: Joe Biden
- Preceded by: Mick Mulvaney (2021)
- Succeeded by: Vacant

Member of the U.S. House of Representatives from Massachusetts's 4th district
- In office January 3, 2013 – January 3, 2021
- Preceded by: Barney Frank
- Succeeded by: Jake Auchincloss

Personal details
- Born: Joseph Patrick Kennedy III; October 4, 1980 (age 46) Boston, Massachusetts, U.S.
- Party: Democratic
- Spouse: Lauren Birchfield (m. 2012)
- Children: 2
- Parent: Joseph P. Kennedy II (father)
- Relatives: Kennedy family
- Education: Stanford University (BS); Harvard University (JD)
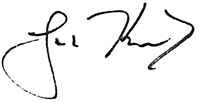
- Signature
- Kennedy's voice Kennedy on Dalip Singh Saund; Recorded February 2020

Joseph Patrick Kennedy III (born October 4, 1980) is an American politician and former diplomat who served as the United States Special Envoy for Northern Ireland from 2022 to 2024. From 2013 to 2021, Kennedy served as the U.S. representative for Massachusetts's 4th congressional district. A member of the Democratic Party, he represented a district that extends from Boston's western suburbs to the state's South Coast. He worked as an assistant district attorney in the Cape and Islands and Middlesex County, Massachusetts, offices before his election to Congress. In January 2021, he became a CNN commentator.

A member of the Kennedy family, he is a son of U.S. Representative Joseph P. Kennedy II, a grandson of U.S. Senator and U.S. Attorney General Robert F. Kennedy, a nephew of U.S. Secretary of Health and Human Services Robert F. Kennedy Jr., a grandnephew of U.S. President John F. Kennedy and U.S. Senator Ted Kennedy, and a great-grandson of U.S. Ambassador to the United Kingdom Joseph P. Kennedy Sr.

Born in Boston, Kennedy was raised in the area with his twin brother, Matthew Rauch Kennedy. After graduating from Stanford University with a bachelor's degree, he spent two years in the Dominican Republic as a member of the Peace Corps before earning a Juris Doctor at Harvard Law School in 2009. He resigned as assistant district attorney in 2012 to run for the U.S. House of Representatives seat held by the retiring Barney Frank. Kennedy was sworn into office in January 2013, and sat on the House Committee on Energy and Commerce. In 2020, he unsuccessfully challenged incumbent Senator Ed Markey for the Democratic nomination in the Massachusetts U.S. Senate election. He was succeeded by his distant cousin-in-law Jake Auchincloss.

Since leaving office, Kennedy has founded Groundwork Project, which focuses on boosting local community organizing efforts nationwide. He has also joined several advisory boards and appeared as a political commentator for CNN. On June 4, 2021, President Joe Biden appointed him to the President's Commission on White House Fellowships. In December 2022, Biden named Kennedy the United States Special Envoy to Northern Ireland for Economic Affairs.

== Early life and career ==
Kennedy was born on October 4, 1980, in Brigham and Women's Hospital in Boston, to Sheila Brewster (Rauch) (b. 1949) and Joseph P. Kennedy II. He was born eight minutes after his fraternal twin brother, Matthew. The twins are the eldest grandsons of Senator Robert F. Kennedy and Ethel Kennedy. Kennedy is also the great-great-grandson of Benjamin Brewster, one of the original trustees of Standard Oil, and a direct descendant of Mayflower Pilgrim William Brewster. They were raised in Brighton and the coastal town of Marshfield, Massachusetts, also spending summers on Cape Cod. From birth, Kennedy was surrounded by politics; in 1980, his parents worked on the presidential campaign of U.S. Senator Ted Kennedy, the boys' grand-uncle. Kennedy's father was elected to the U.S. House of Representatives in 1986. His parents divorced in 1991. The twins spent the following years moving between Brighton and Cambridge, Massachusetts.

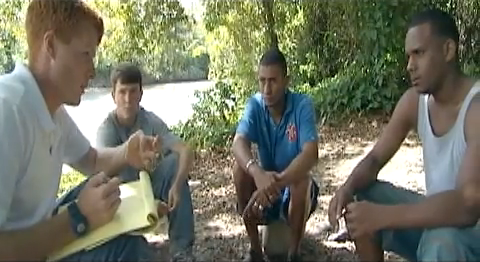
Kennedy (left) in the Dominican Republic as part of the Peace Corps

After graduating from Buckingham Browne & Nichols School in Cambridge, Kennedy and his brother enrolled at Stanford University, where he majored in management science and engineering. Kennedy's reputation as a teetotaler earned him the college nickname "Milkman", as his teammates on the club lacrosse team would jokingly order him glasses of milk at bars. At Stanford, Kennedy roomed with future NBA player Jason Collins.

After graduating in 2003, Kennedy joined the Peace Corps; a fluent Spanish speaker, he worked in the Dominican Republic's Puerto Plata province from 2004 to 2006, helping local tour guides in the 27 Charcos reserve in the Río Damajagua Park. He reorganized the group with some outside backing, directing the guides to rebuild parts of the park and develop skills to make the operation more attractive to tourists. "We basically created a union," said Kennedy, who reported that the group's efforts won higher wages for employees while increasing the tour companies' revenue. According to a press release, his other activities in the Peace Corps included "stints as an Anti-Poverty Consultant for the Office of the President of the Democratic Republic of Timor-Leste and a Research Analyst for the United Nations Development Program."

=== Entry into law and politics ===
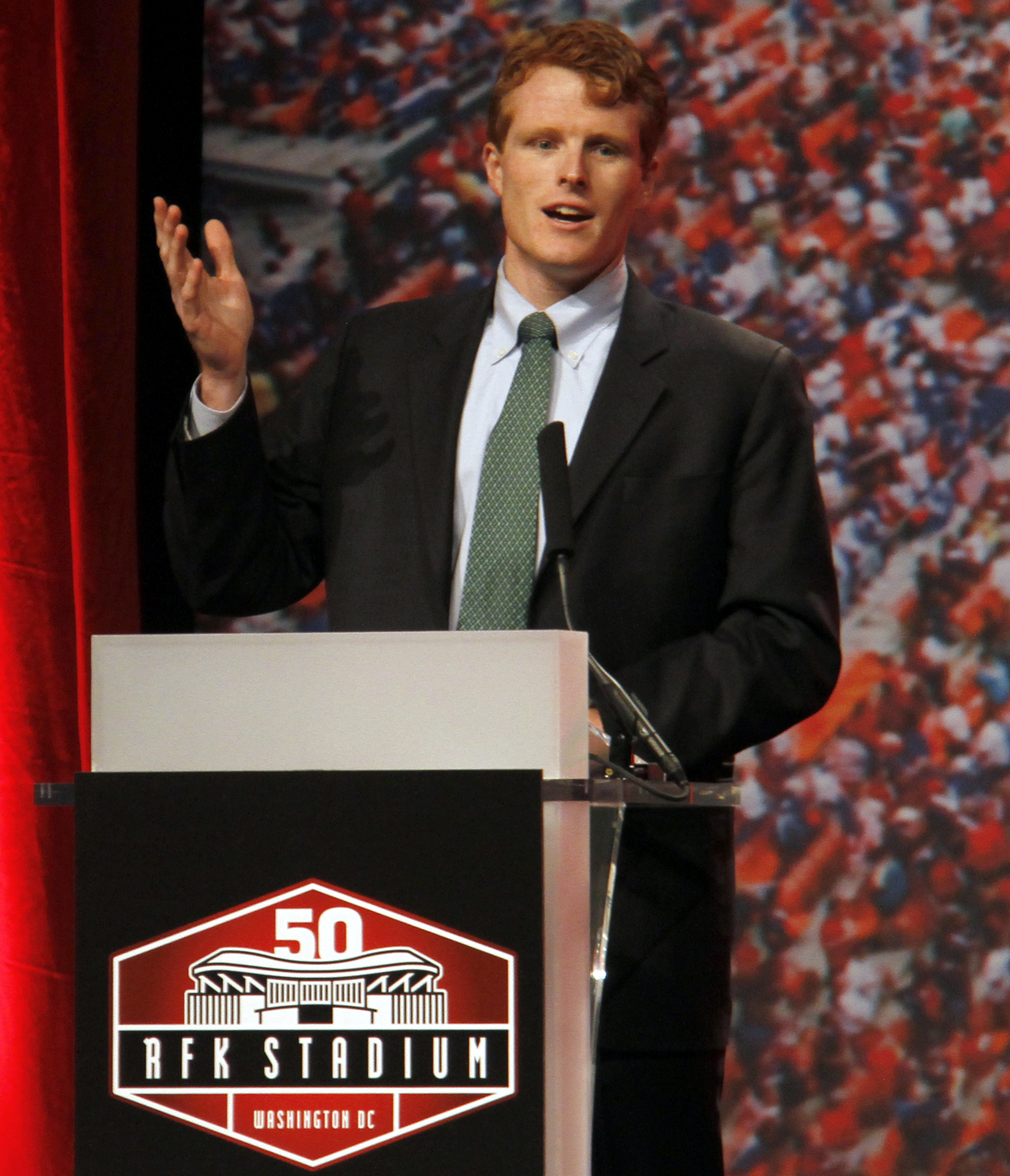
Kennedy speaking at the 50th Anniversary of the Robert F. Kennedy Memorial Stadium (2011)

In April 2006, Kennedy returned to Massachusetts, where he and his brother co-chaired Ted Kennedy's re-election campaign. The same month, Kennedy enrolled in Harvard Law School. There, he worked for the Harvard Legal Aid Bureau, providing legal aid to low-income tenants with foreclosure cases during the 2008 financial crisis, and as a technical editor for the Harvard Human Rights Journal, on a staff with his classmate and future wife, Lauren Anne Birchfield. In 2007, he and Birchfield co-founded Picture This: Justice and Power, an after-school program for youths in Boston's Jamaica Plain neighborhood. He began an internship at the Cape and Islands District Attorney's Office in 2008.

After earning his Juris Doctor in 2009, Kennedy was hired at the Cape and Islands District Attorney's Office as an assistant district attorney (ADA). He considered running for the Cape-based U.S. House seat held by retiring Rep. Bill Delahunt in early 2010 but decided against it. In September 2011, he joined the Middlesex County, Massachusetts District Attorney's Office, also as an ADA. He resigned several months later, in preparation for the announcement that he would seek political office.

== U.S. House of Representatives ==
=== Elections ===
==== 2012 ====
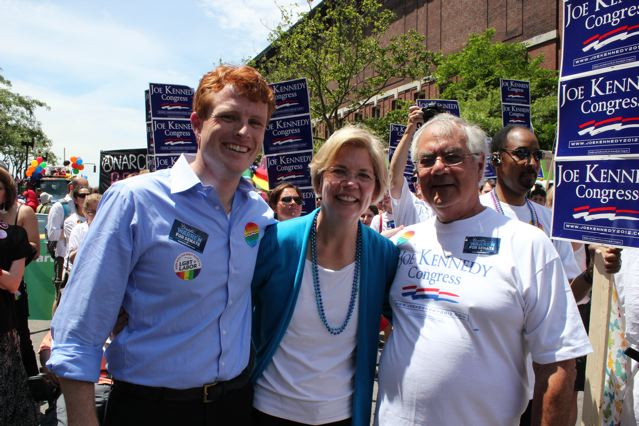
Kennedy (left) campaigning with Elizabeth Warren (center), and his predecessor Barney Frank (right), 2012 Boston Pride Parade

In January 2012, Kennedy announced he would form an exploratory committee to run in the newly redrawn 4th congressional district of Massachusetts. Kennedy explained, "I will then begin to reach out to the people of the Fourth District, in order to hear directly from them about the challenges they are facing and their ideas on how we can restore fairness to our system. I will make a final decision about entering the race in the weeks thereafter."

He officially entered the election in February 2012. In an announcement video, Kennedy declared, "I believe this country was founded on a simple idea: that every person deserves to be treated fairly, by each other and by their government". In the same video, Kennedy vowed to fight for a "fair job plan", a "better educational system", a "fair tax code", and a "fair housing policy".

While several Democratic candidates had prepared to enter the race, the field nearly cleared once Kennedy announced his candidacy. His family roots made him the overwhelming favorite among Massachusetts Democrats. In the September 6 primary, he faced Rachel Brown, a Lyndon LaRouche acolyte, and Herb Robinson, an engineer and musician, winning the primary with around 90 percent of the vote. He was elected to the House of Representatives on November 6, 2012, defeating Republican candidate Sean Bielat, winning over 60% of the vote.

==== 2014 ====
In the 2014 election, Kennedy ran unopposed in the primary and general elections. On November 4, 2014, he was re-elected to a second term with 184,158 votes (98%).

==== 2016 ====
In 2016, after running unopposed in the Democratic primary, Kennedy was re-elected to a third term, defeating Republican David Rosa by more than 40 percentage points.

==== 2018 ====
Kennedy was mentioned as a potential candidate for the 2018 Massachusetts gubernatorial election but declined, running for re-election to the House and saying he had no plans to run for any other office. He was re-elected unopposed.

Committee assignments
115th Congress (2017–19)
- Energy and Commerce
  - Commerce, Manufacturing, and Trade
  - Health
  - Oversight and Investigations

=== Tenure ===
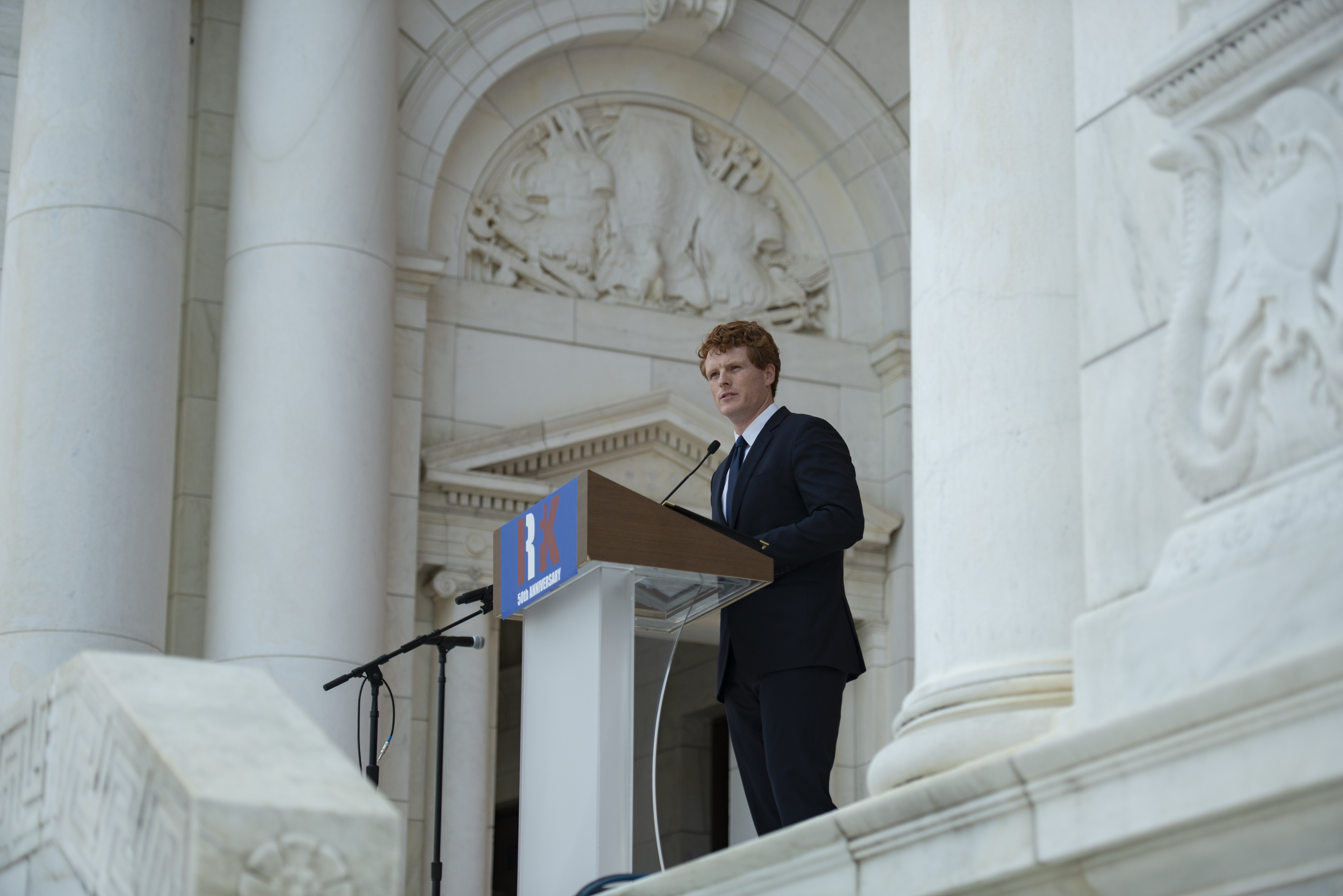
Joe Kennedy III speaks during a ceremony celebrating the life of his grandfather, Robert F. Kennedy, in 2018.

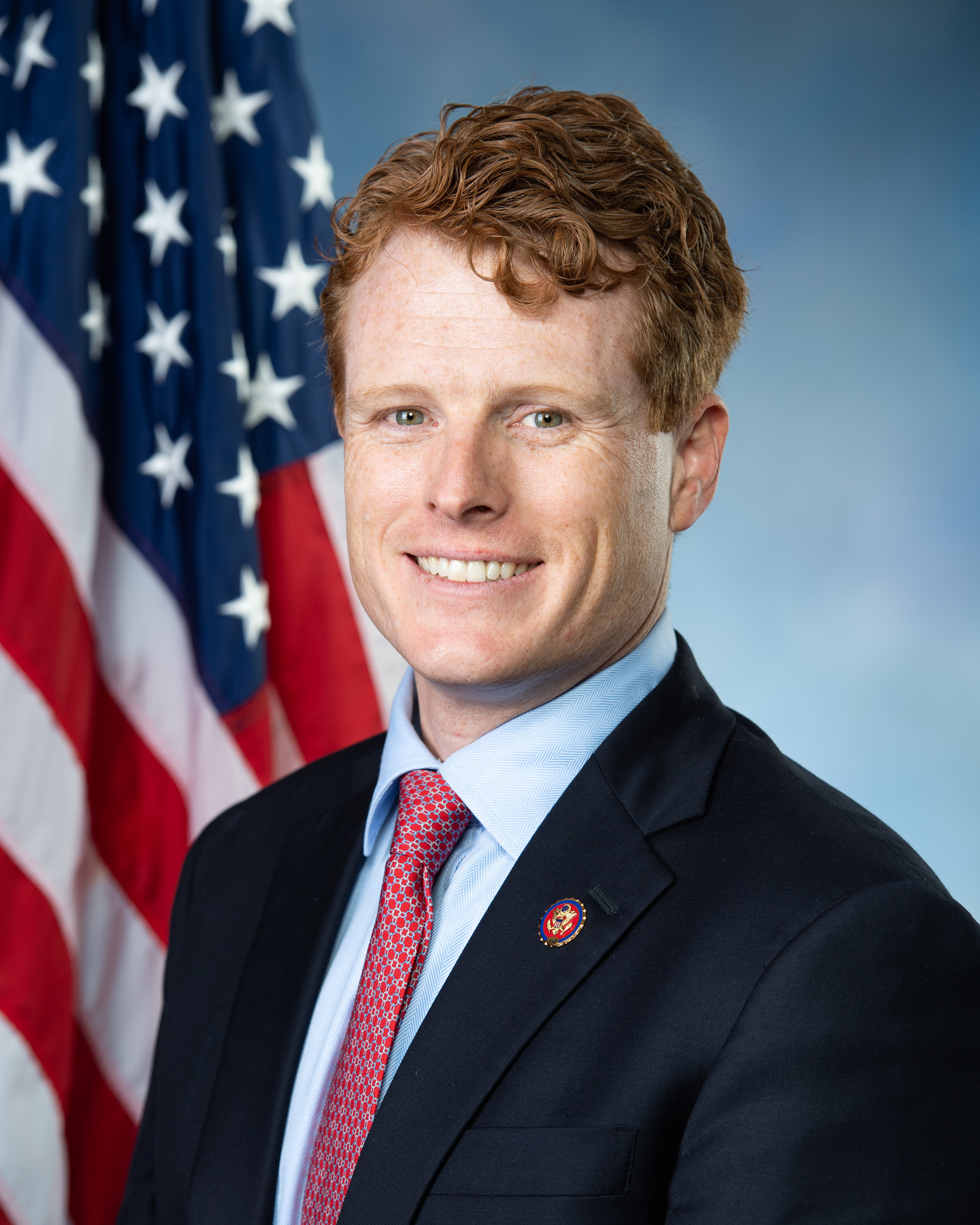
Kennedy's official portrait during the 116th United States Congress

Kennedy was sworn in to the 113th U.S. Congress on January 3, 2013, and assigned to the Committee on Foreign Affairs and the Committee on Science, Space, and Technology. He praised the technology committee assignment as an opportunity to secure federal funding, including National Science Foundation and Small Business Innovation Research grants, for life sciences companies in his district. As a freshman in his party, he was unable to secure a seat he had sought on the Education Committee.

During a February science committee hearing, Kennedy questioned Texas Instruments president Richard Templeton about the company's efforts to compensate cancer-stricken former employees of its Attleboro, Massachusetts, nuclear facility. A prolific fundraiser, he launched his political action committee, the 4MA PAC, in April. As a member of the Foreign Affairs Committee, he traveled in May with four other legislators to Afghanistan, where they met with President Hamid Karzai and members of the military. That month, he was named chairman of Governor Deval Patrick's STEM Advisory Council.

On July 24, 2013, Kennedy was one of seven members of the Congressional Progressive Caucus (CPC) to vote against the Amash-Conyers amendment to limit Section 215 of the Patriot Act, which tried to restrict NSA surveillance programs. In contrast, a majority of both CPC members and of Democratic members of Congress voted for the amendment, while Kennedy stood out as a supporter of the party leadership. His vote has been criticized as a sign for a lack of commitment to civil liberties.

Kennedy was a member of the U.S.-Japan Caucus.

==== Response to the 2018 State of the Union ====
On January 26, 2018, House Minority Leader Nancy Pelosi and Senate Minority Leader Chuck Schumer announced that Kennedy would deliver the Democratic response to President Donald Trump's 2018 State of the Union address. His selection came after criticism that the Democratic Party had relied too heavily on its oldest leaders since the 2016 presidential election. In choosing Kennedy, the party was seen as trying to bridge the gap with a new face attached to one of the most famous names in American politics. On January 30, he gave the response to television cameras and a live studio audience in the automotive body shop of Diman Regional Vocational Technical High School at Fall River, Massachusetts. The location was meant to emphasize the role immigrants have in American society. He spent the opening minutes of his speech boasting about the economy and industrial history of Fall River, a city in his district. His audience included Diman Regional Technical School students. He praised Black Lives Matter, and spoke in Spanish about children who were brought into the United States illegally when they were minors. He also took numerous swings at Trump, criticizing the Department of Justice for "rolling back civil rights by the day" and attacking the administration for "targeting the very idea that we are all worthy of protection". He accused Trump of turning American life "into a zero-sum game", and said that Democrats intended to aid the middle and lower classes. He closed by characterizing the state of the union as "hopeful, resilient, enduring".

== 2020 U.S. Senate campaign ==
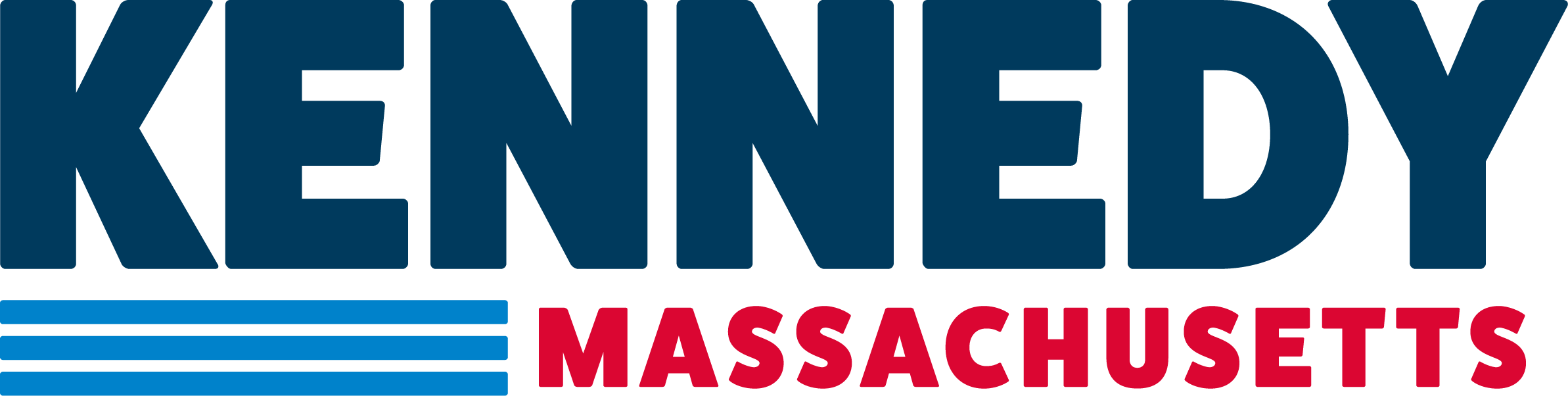
Logo for Kennedy's 2020 Senate Campaign

On August 26, 2019, Kennedy announced he was considering a primary challenge against incumbent Senator Ed Markey, and on September 21, he formally announced his candidacy. He announced that he would not seek re-election, instead challenging Markey in the Democratic primary for the 2020 United States Senate election in Massachusetts. On September 1, 2020, Markey defeated him in the Democratic primary. Kennedy became the first member of his family to lose an election in Massachusetts.

His defeat was widely attributed to his inability to explain his reasons for running. Additionally, Markey had strength among progressives and younger voters, buoyed by active youth involvement. Kennedy was endorsed by House Speaker Nancy Pelosi, while Markey had the support of Senate Minority Leader Chuck Schumer, former Vice President Al Gore, Senator Elizabeth Warren, Representative Alexandria Ocasio-Cortez, the youth-led Sunrise Movement, and The Boston Globe. The race was considered a showdown between the Democratic establishment and its new and growing progressive wing, although the lines between the two were blurred, as Kennedy was a member of the Congressional Progressive Caucus, endorsed by many members, and Markey had been in Congress 43 years at the time.

== Biden administration ==
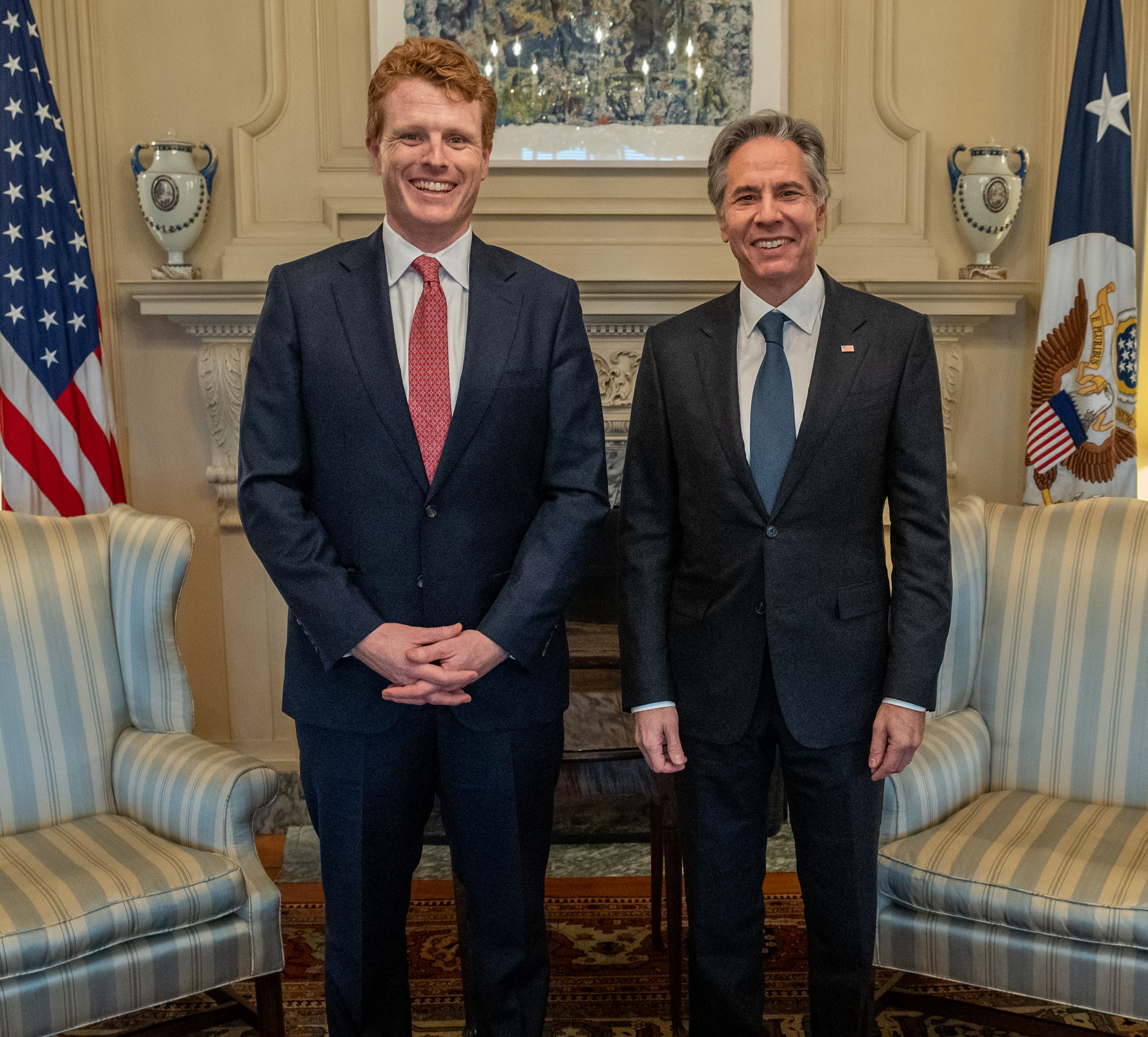
Kennedy with Secretary of State Antony Blinken in 2023

=== United States Special Envoy to Northern Ireland for Economic Affairs ===
On December 19, 2022, President Biden announced Kennedy would replace Mick Mulvaney as U.S. Special Envoy for Northern Ireland. Mulvaney retired in 2021.

Although not strictly a diplomatic role, he is the sixth Kennedy family member to serve as a diplomat/foreign envoy. Cousin Caroline Kennedy was U.S. Ambassador to Japan from 2013 to 2017 and U.S. Ambassador to Australia from 2022 to 2024. Aunt Victoria Reggie Kennedy was U.S. Ambassador to Austria from 2022 to 2025. Aunt Jean Kennedy Smith was U.S. Ambassador to Ireland from 1993 to 1998. Uncle Sargent Shriver was U.S. Ambassador to France from 1968 to 1970. Great-grandfather Joseph P. Kennedy Sr. was U.S. Ambassador to the United Kingdom from 1938 to 1940.

Kennedy vacated the position on December 13, 2024, ahead of the impending end of the Biden administration.

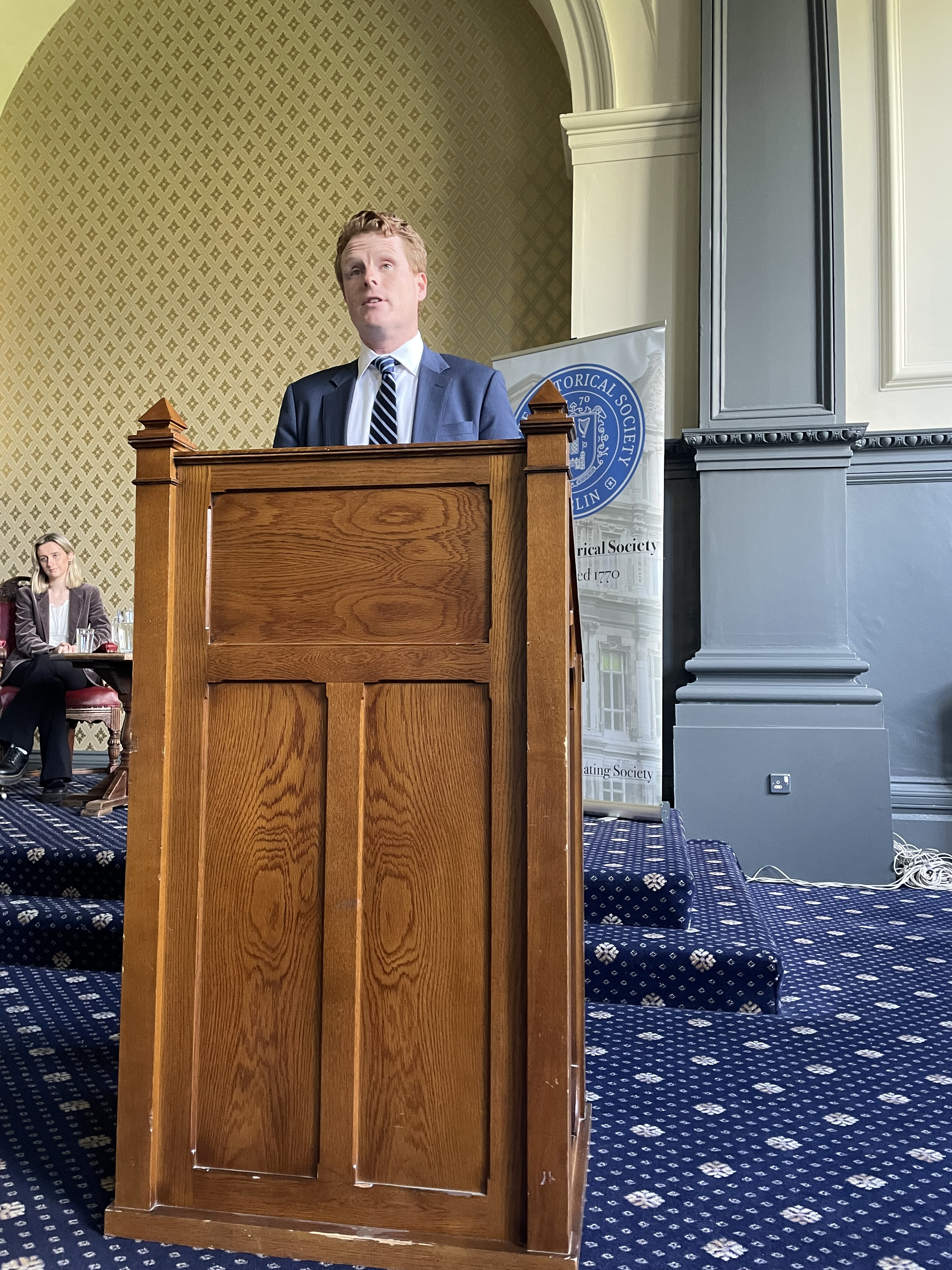
Kennedy speaking at a College Historical Society event in 2023

== Political positions ==
=== Civil rights ===
Kennedy has co-sponsored legislation to study reparations for slavery, supports measures to expand the civil rights of Native Americans, opposes discrimination in employment, housing, education, and health care, and supports removing barriers to equal opportunities for people with disabilities, including improving access to public transit, housing, voting, and education. He supports LGBTQIA+ rights, recognition of a national Transgender Day of Remembrance and was a member of the Congressional Transgender Equality Task Force. In the area of gender equity, he is an advocate of legislation to end workplace discrimination and wage discrimination and is a supporter of the Me Too movement.

=== Marijuana legalization ===
Kennedy helped raise funds in 2016 for the defeat of Question 4 to legalize cannabis for recreational use in Massachusetts. He also voted against the Rohrabacher–Farr amendment in 2015 which limits the enforcement of federal law in states that have legalized medical cannabis. In November 2018 he changed his stance towards cannabis and endorsed its legalization at the federal level, however. In January 2020 he co-sponsored a bill to federally legalize cannabis known as the Marijuana Opportunity Reinvestment and Expungement (MORE) Act.

=== Climate change ===
Kennedy co-sponsored the Green New Deal, and supports aggressive action to reduce carbon emissions, enforce pollution control standards, protect public lands from fossil fuel extraction, promote clean energy alternatives to pipelines and compressor stations, and invest in related infrastructure and scientific research. He supports strict fuel efficiency standards and the elimination of exemptions to the Clean Air Act, and opposed the United States' withdrawal from the Paris Agreement under President Donald Trump.

=== Racial inequality ===
Kennedy has helped pass legislation to guarantee access to STEM and vocational education, and co-sponsored legislation to eliminate most student debt. He has also co-sponsored legislation to reduce racial discrimination in housing, favors increasing the portion of federal grants earmarked for minority-owned small businesses, and supports criminal justice reform.

=== Health care ===
Kennedy supports strengthening Social Security and Medicare, and favors having Medicare negotiate prescription drug prices directly with drug manufacturers. Kennedy is also a supporter of universal health-care.

== Electoral history ==
Massachusetts's 4th congressional district, results 2012–2018
Year	Democrat			Republican			3rd party			
Year	Candidate	Votes	Pct.	Candidate	Votes	Pct.	Candidate	Party	Votes	Pct.
2012	Joseph P. Kennedy III	221,303	61.1%	Sean D. Bielat	129,936	35.9%	David A. Rosa	Independent	10,741	3.0%
2014	Joseph P. Kennedy III (incumbent)	184,158	97.9%	(no candidate)			write-ins		3,940	2.1%
2016	Joseph P. Kennedy III (incumbent)	265,823	70.1%	David A. Rosa	113,055	29.8%	write-ins		335	0.1%
2018	Joseph P. Kennedy III (incumbent)	245,289	97.7%	(no candidate)			write-ins		5,727	2.3%

2020 U.S. Senate Democratic primary results
Party	Candidate	Votes	%
Democratic	Ed Markey (incumbent)	782,694	55.35
Democratic	Joseph P. Kennedy III	629,359	44.51
Total votes			100.0%

== Personal life ==
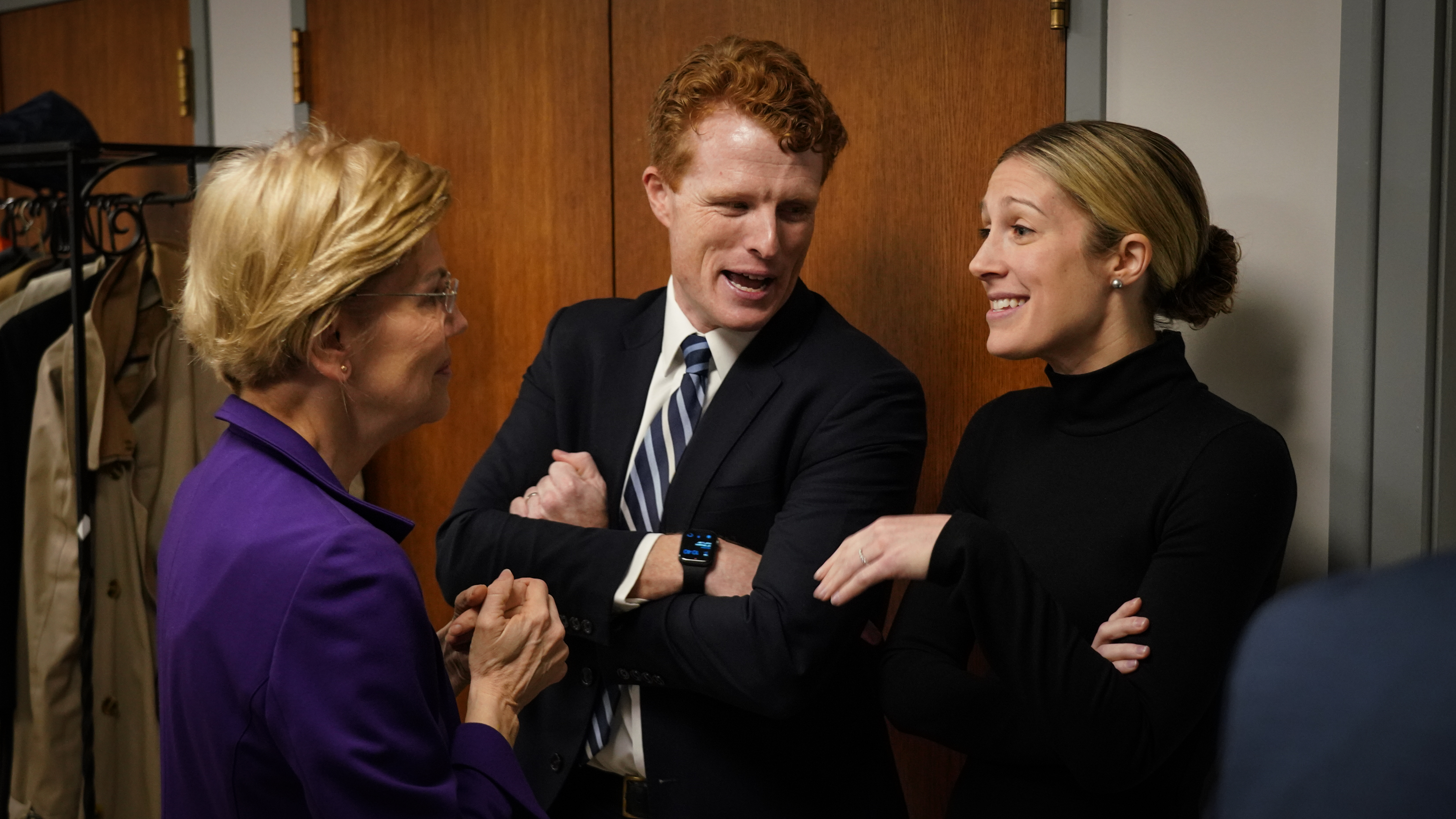
Elizabeth Warren (left) speaking with Kennedy (center) and his wife, Lauren, in 2019

Kennedy married health policy lawyer Lauren Anne Birchfield, a graduate of the University of California, Los Angeles and a finalist for the Rhodes Scholarship, in Corona del Mar, California, on December 1, 2012. The couple met in Harvard Law School, where they took a class taught by future U.S. Senator Elizabeth Warren. On December 29, 2015, Birchfield gave birth to their daughter, Eleanor. On December 20, 2017, Kennedy announced the birth of their second child, a son, James. The family lives in Newton, Massachusetts.

Kennedy's net worth is about $43 million, which made him among the wealthiest members of Congress.

== See also ==
- Kennedy family
- List of Harvard University politicians
- List of Stanford University alumni

U.S. House of Representatives
Preceded by Barney Frank	Member of the U.S. House of Representatives from Massachusetts's 4th congressional district 2013–2021	Succeeded by Jake Auchincloss
Party political offices
Preceded by Steve Beshear	Response to the State of the Union address 2018	Succeeded by Stacey Abrams
Diplomatic posts
Vacant Title last held by Mick Mulvaney; 2021	United States Special Envoy for Northern Ireland; 2022–2024	Vacant
U.S. order of precedence (ceremonial)
Preceded by Chester G. Atkins as Former U.S. Representative	Order of precedence of the United States as Former U.S. Representative	Succeeded by Robert Bauman as Former U.S. Representative
