= 2014 United States House of Representatives elections in Massachusetts =

- November 4, 2014

All 9 Massachusetts seats to the United States House of Representatives
	Majority party	Minority party
Party	Democratic	Republican
Last election	9	0
Seats won	9	0
Seat change	Steady	Steady
Popular vote	1,475,442	308,598
Percentage	81.45%	17.04%
Swing	▲15.41%	▼12.63%
- Democratic 50–60% 60–70% 90>%

The 2014 United States House of Representatives elections in Massachusetts were held on Tuesday, November 4, 2014, to elect the nine U.S. representatives from the Commonwealth of Massachusetts, one from each of the state's nine congressional districts. The elections coincided with the election of Massachusetts' class II U.S. senator and other elections to the United States Senate in other states and elections to the United States House of Representatives and various state and local elections, including the governor of Massachusetts.

Democratic nominees were victorious in all nine Massachusetts districts in 2014, bringing the Republican losing streak in Bay State U.S. House general and special elections to a state record 101 contests in a row.

== Overview ==
Results of the 2014 United States House of Representatives elections in Massachusetts by district:

District	Democratic		Republican		Others		Total		Result
District	Votes	%	Votes	%	Votes	%	Votes	%	Result
District 1	167,612	97.96%	0	0.00%	3,498	2.04%	171,110	100.0%	Democratic hold
District 2	169,640	98.20%	0	0.00%	3,105	1.80%	172,745	100.0%	Democratic hold
District 3	139,104	62.96%	81,638	36.95%	204	0.09%	220,946	100.0%	Democratic hold
District 4	184,158	97.91%	0	0.00%	3,940	2.09%	188,098	100.0%	Democratic hold
District 5	182,100	98.29%	0	0.00%	3,160	1.71%	185,260	100.0%	Democratic hold
District 6	149,638	54.97%	111,989	41.14%	10,592	3.89%	272,219	100.0%	Democratic hold
District 7	142,133	98.33%	0	0.00%	2,413	1.67%	144,546	100.0%	Democratic hold
District 8	200,644	98.67%	0	0.00%	2,707	1.33%	203,351	100.0%	Democratic hold
District 9	140,413	54.95%	114,971	44.99%	157	0.06%	255,541	100.0%	Democratic hold
Total	1,475,442	81.35%	308,598	17.01%	29,776	1.64%	1,813,816	100.0%	

== District 1 ==
2014 Massachusetts's 1st congressional district election
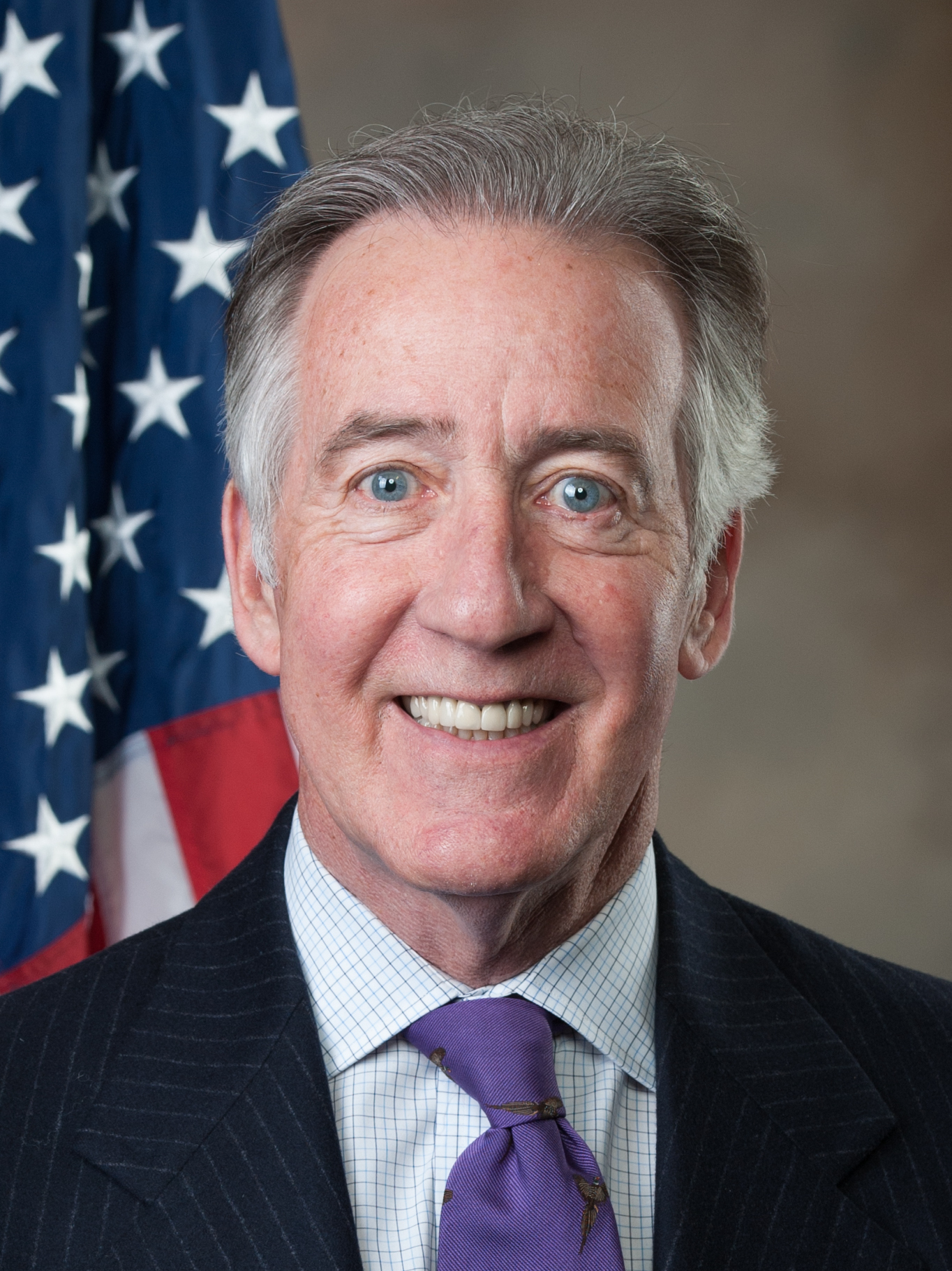
Nominee	Richard Neal
Party	Democratic
Popular vote	167,612
Percentage	98.0%
- County results Neal: 90–100%
U.S. Representative before election
Richard Neal
Democratic
Elected U.S. Representative
Richard Neal
Democratic

The 1st congressional district is located in western and central Massachusetts. The largest Massachusetts district in area, it covers about one-third of the state and is more rural than the rest. It has the state's highest point, Mount Greylock. The district includes the cities of Springfield, West Springfield, Pittsfield, Holyoke, and Westfield. Incumbent Democrat Richard Neal, who has represented the district since 2013 and previously represented the 2nd district from 1989 to 2013, ran for re-election. He was re-elected unopposed with 98% of the vote in 2012 and the district had a PVI of D+13.

=== Democratic primary ===
==== Candidates ====
===== Nominee =====
- Richard Neal, incumbent U.S. Representative

=== General election ===
==== Predictions ====
Source	Ranking	As of
The Cook Political Report	Safe D	November 3, 2014
Rothenberg	Safe D	October 24, 2014
Sabato's Crystal Ball	Safe D	October 30, 2014
RCP	Safe D	November 2, 2014
Daily Kos Elections	Safe D	November 4, 2014

==== Results ====
Massachusetts's 1st congressional district, 2014
Party	Candidate	Votes	%
Democratic	Richard Neal (incumbent)	167,612	98.0
n/a	Write-ins	3,498	2.0
Total votes		171,110	100.0
Democratic hold			

== District 2 ==
2014 Massachusetts's 2nd congressional district election
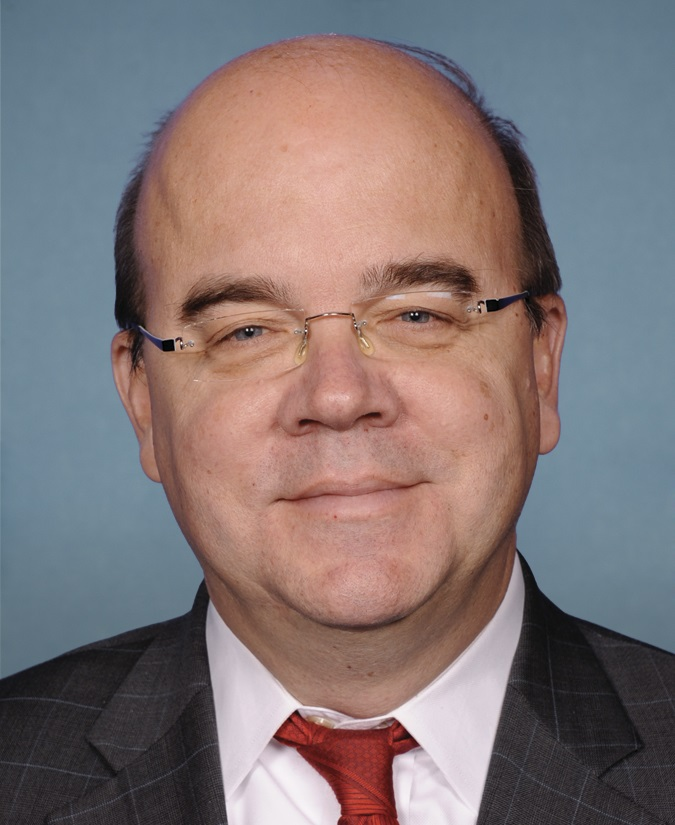
Nominee	Jim McGovern
Party	Democratic
Popular vote	169,640
Percentage	98.2%
- County results Mcgovern: 90–100% 100–110%
U.S. Representative before election
Jim McGovern
Democratic
Elected U.S. Representative
Jim McGovern
Democratic

The 2nd congressional district is located in central Massachusetts. It contains the cities of Worcester, which is the second-largest city in New England after Boston, and Northampton in the Pioneer Valley. The incumbent is Democrat Jim McGovern, who has represented the district since 2013 and previously represented the 3rd district from 1997 to 2013, ran for re-election. He was re-elected unopposed with 99% of the vote in 2012 and the district had a PVI of D+8.

=== Democratic primary ===
==== Candidates ====
===== Nominee =====
- Jim McGovern, incumbent U.S. Representative

=== Republican primary ===
==== Candidates ====
===== Nominee =====
- Dan Dubrule

Due to state ballot law, Dubrule ran as a write-in candidate in the general election.

=== General election ===
==== Predictions ====
Source	Ranking	As of
The Cook Political Report	Safe D	November 3, 2014
Rothenberg	Safe D	October 24, 2014
Sabato's Crystal Ball	Safe D	October 30, 2014
RCP	Safe D	November 2, 2014
Daily Kos Elections	Safe D	November 4, 2014

==== Results ====
Massachusetts's 2nd congressional district, 2014
Party	Candidate	Votes	%
Democratic	Jim McGovern (incumbent)	169,640	98.2
n/a	Write-ins	3,105	1.8
Total votes		172,745	100.0
Democratic hold			

== District 3 ==
2014 Massachusetts's 3rd congressional district election
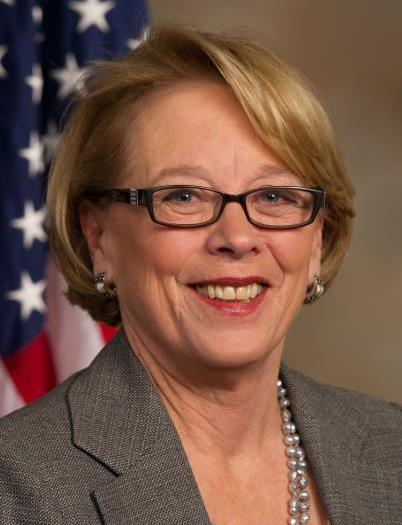

Nominee	Niki Tsongas	Ann Wofford
Party	Democratic	Republican
Popular vote	139,104	81,638
Percentage	63.0%	36.9%
- County results Tsongas: 50–60% 60–70%
U.S. Representative before election
Niki Tsongas
Democratic
Elected U.S. Representative
Niki Tsongas
Democratic

The 3rd congressional district is located in northeastern and central Massachusetts. It contains the Merrimack valley including Lowell, Lawrence and Haverhill. TIncumbent Democrat Niki Tsongas, who has represented the district since 2013 and previously represented the 5th district from 2007 to 2013, ran for re-election. She was re-elected with 66% of the vote in 2012 and the district had a PVI of D+6.

=== Democratic primary ===
==== Candidates ====
===== Nominee =====
- Niki Tsongas, incumbent U.S. Representative

=== Republican primary ===
==== Candidates ====
===== Nominee =====
- Ann Wofford

=== General election ===
==== Predictions ====
Source	Ranking	As of
The Cook Political Report	Safe D	November 3, 2014
Rothenberg	Safe D	October 24, 2014
Sabato's Crystal Ball	Safe D	October 30, 2014
RCP	Safe D	November 2, 2014
Daily Kos Elections	Safe D	November 4, 2014

==== Results ====
Massachusetts's 3rd congressional district, 2014
Party	Candidate	Votes	%
Democratic	Niki Tsongas (incumbent)	139,104	63.0
Republican	Ann Wofford	81,638	36.9
n/a	Write-ins	204	0.1
Total votes		220,946	100.0
Democratic hold			

== District 4 ==
2014 Massachusetts's 4th congressional district election
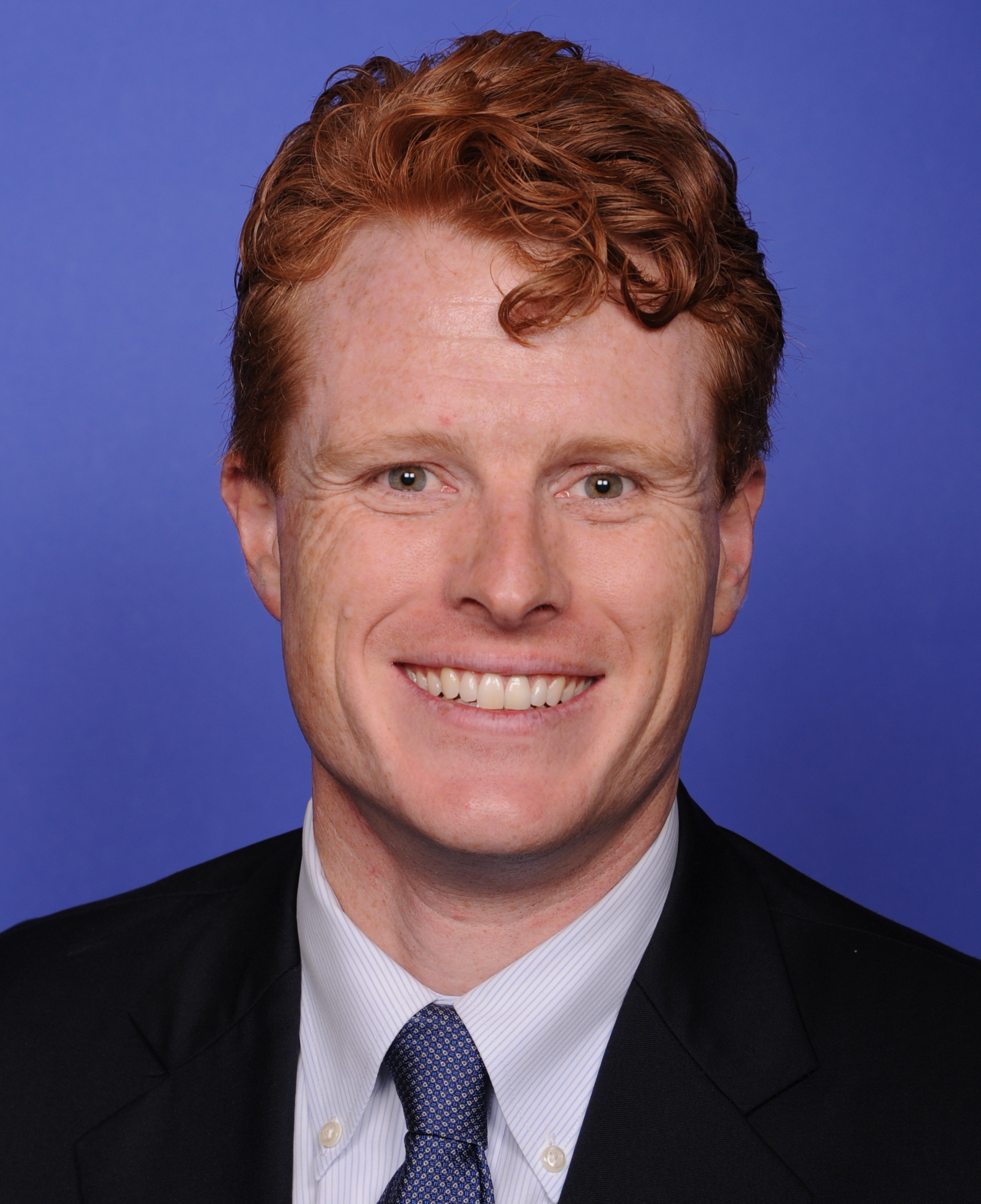
Nominee	Joe Kennedy III
Party	Democratic
Popular vote	184,158
Percentage	97.9%
- County results Kennedy: 90–100%
U.S. Representative before election
Joe Kennedy III
Democratic
Elected U.S. Representative
Joe Kennedy III
Democratic

The 4th congressional district is located mostly in southern Massachusetts. It contains Bristol, Middlesex, Norfolk, Plymouth and Worcester counties. Incumbent Democrat Joseph P. Kennedy III, who had represented the district since 2013, ran for re-election. He was elected with 61% of the vote in 2012 and the district had a PVI of D+6.

=== Democratic primary ===
==== Candidates ====
===== Nominee =====
- Joe Kennedy III, incumbent U.S. Representative

=== General election ===
==== Predictions ====
Source	Ranking	As of
The Cook Political Report	Safe D	November 3, 2014
Rothenberg	Safe D	October 24, 2014
Sabato's Crystal Ball	Safe D	October 30, 2014
RCP	Safe D	November 2, 2014
Daily Kos Elections	Safe D	November 4, 2014

==== Results ====
Massachusetts's 4th congressional district, 2014
Party	Candidate	Votes	%
Democratic	Joe Kennedy III (incumbent)	184,158	97.9
n/a	Write-ins	3,940	2.1
Total votes		188,098	100.0
Democratic hold			

== District 5 ==
2014 Massachusetts's 5th congressional district election
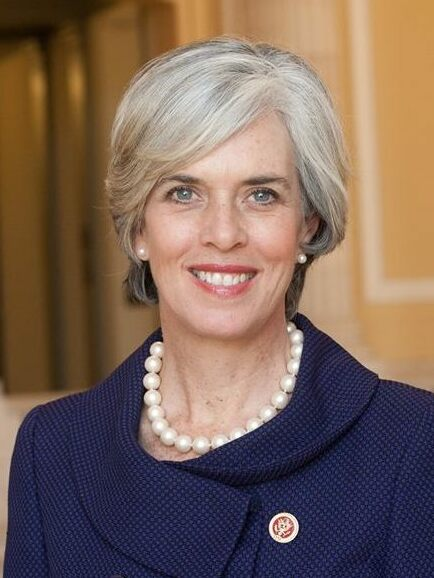
Nominee	Katherine Clark
Party	Democratic
Popular vote	182,100
Percentage	98.3%
- County results Clark: 90–100%
U.S. Representative before election
Katherine Clark
Democratic
Elected U.S. Representative
Katherine Clark
Democratic

The 5th congressional district is located in eastern Massachusetts. It contains Middlesex, Suffolk and Worcester counties. Incumbent Democrat Katherine Clark, who had represented the district since 2013, ran for re-election. She was elected with 66% of the vote in a special election in 2013 to succeed Ed Markey and the district had a PVI of D+14.

=== Democratic primary ===
==== Candidates ====
===== Nominee =====
- Katherine Clark, incumbent U.S. Representative

===== Eliminated in primary =====
- Sheldon Schwartz

==== Results ====
Democratic primary results
Party	Candidate	Votes	%
Democratic	Katherine Clark (incumbent)	57,014	81.2
Democratic	Sheldon Schwartz	13,070	18.6
Democratic	All others	140	0.2
Total votes		70,224	100.0

=== Republican primary ===
==== Candidates ====
===== Withdrawn =====
- Mike Stopa

=== General election ===
==== Predictions ====
Source	Ranking	As of
The Cook Political Report	Safe D	November 3, 2014
Rothenberg	Safe D	October 24, 2014
Sabato's Crystal Ball	Safe D	October 30, 2014
RCP	Safe D	November 2, 2014
Daily Kos Elections	Safe D	November 4, 2014

==== Results ====
Massachusetts's 5th congressional district, 2014
Party	Candidate	Votes	%
Democratic	Katherine Clark (incumbent)	182,100	98.3
n/a	Write-ins	3,159	1.7
Total votes		185,259	100.0
Democratic hold			

== District 6 ==
2014 Massachusetts's 6th congressional district election
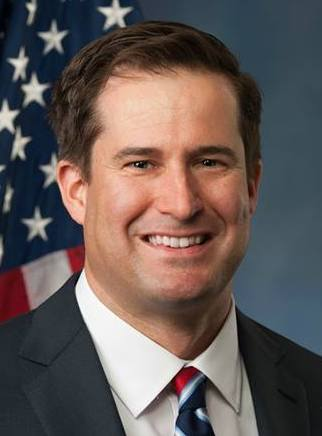

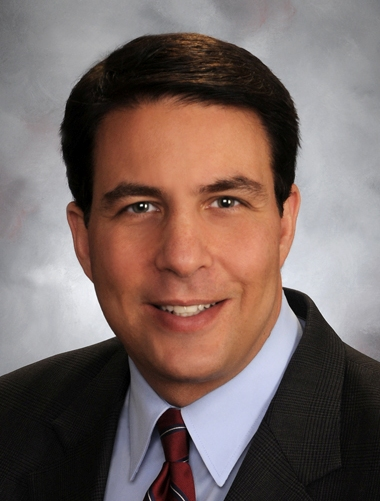
Nominee	Seth Moulton	Richard Tisei
Party	Democratic	Republican
Popular vote	149,638	111,989
Percentage	55.0%	41.1%
- Municipality results Moulton: 40–50% 50–60% 60–70% 70–80% Tisei: 40–50% 50–60% 60–70%
U.S. Representative before election
John F. Tierney
Democratic
Elected U.S. Representative
Seth Moulton
Democratic

The 6th congressional district is located in northeastern Massachusetts. It contains most of Essex County, including the North Shore and Cape Ann. Incumbent Democrat John F. Tierney, who had represented the district since 1997, ran for re-election, but was defeated in the primary by U.S. Marine Seth Moulton. Tierney was re-elected with 48% of the vote in 2012, and the district had a PVI of D+4.

=== Democratic primary ===
==== Candidates ====
===== Nominee =====
- Seth Moulton, Marine Veteran and military commentator

===== Eliminated in primary =====
- Marisa DeFranco, immigration attorney
- John Devine
- John Gutta
- John F. Tierney, incumbent U.S. Representative

===== Declined =====
- Kim Driscoll, Mayor of Salem
- John D. Keenan, state representative
- Steven Walsh, state representative

==== Polling ====
Poll source	Date(s) administered	Sample size	Margin of error	John F. Tierney	Marisa DeFranco	John Devine	John Gutta	Seth Moulton	Undecided
Remington	September 3–6, 2014	777	±3.53%	43%	4%	1%	1%	42%	9%
Public Policy Polling (D-Moulton)	September 2–3, 2014	592	± 4%	45%	—	—	—	47%	8%
Emerson College	September 2–4, 2014	343	±5.25%	47%	4%	1%	—	44%	6%
Emerson College	June 12–18, 2014	—	—	59%	9%	2%	—	17%	13%
Emerson College	April 3–7, 2014	—	—	64%	10%	—	—	10%	14%
DCCC	March 26–27, 2014	402	±4.9%	64%	—	—	—	17%	20%

==== Results ====
Primary results: Moulton: 40–50%; 50–60%; 60–70%; 70–80%; Tierney: 40–50%; 50–60%

Moulton defeated Tierney in the primary.

Democratic primary results
Party	Candidate	Votes	%
Democratic	Seth Moulton	34,575	50.8
Democratic	John F. Tierney (incumbent)	28,912	40.1
Democratic	Marisa DeFranco	4,293	6.0
Democratic	John Devine	1,527	2.1
Democratic	John Gutta	691	1.0
Total votes		74,170	100.0

=== Republican primary ===
==== Candidates ====
===== Nominee =====
- Richard Tisei, former minority leader of the Massachusetts Senate, nominee for lieutenant governor in 2010 and nominee for this seat in 2012

=== General election ===
==== Polling ====
Poll source	Date(s) administered	Sample size	Margin of error	Seth Moulton (D)	Richard Tisei (R)	Chris Stockwell (I)	Other	Undecided
Emerson College	October 26–29, 2014	400	± 4.85%	40%	42%	3%	15%	
0ptimus	October 22–25, 2014	1,807	± 2%	41%	43%	12%	—	6%
0ptimus	October 16–19, 2014	2,994	± 1.77%	48%	46%	—	—	6%
GarinHartYang/HMP	October 16–17, 2014	406	± 5%	47%	36%	9%	—	8%
Emerson College	October 13–14, 2014	400	± 4.85%	40%	43%	2%	—	10%
0ptimus	October 6–9, 2014	6,929	± ?	45%	47%	—	—	8%
Voter Consumer Research	October 6–9, 2014	400	± 4.9%	42%	44%	—	14%	
Emerson College	September 26–29, 2014	429	± 4.68%	39%	41%	3%	—	17%
GarinHartYang/HMP	September 24–27, 2014	400	± 5%	43%	33%	11%	—	13%
Tarrance Group (R-Tisei)	September 23–25, 2014	400	± 4.9%	40%	41%	—	9%	10%
MassINC/WBUR	September 22–24, 2014	400	± 4.9%	47%	39%	—	1%	14%
Municipoll	September 12–14, 2014	490	± 4.4%	49%	31%	—	—	20%
DCCC (D)	September 13, 2014	432	± 4.7%	49%	41%	—	—	10%
Emerson College	September 2–4, 2014	500	± 4.33%	44%	36%	—	—	20%

Hypothetical polling

Poll source	Date(s) administered	Sample size	Margin of error	John F. Tierney (D)	Richard Tisei (R)	Other	Undecided
Emerson College	September 2–4, 2014	500	± 4.33%	43%	51%	—	6%
Emerson College	June 12–18, 2014	253	± 6.12%	40%	45%	—	15%
Emerson College	April 3–7, 2014	326	± 5.4%	44%	44%	—	13%

==== Predictions ====
Source	Ranking	As of
The Cook Political Report	Lean D	November 3, 2014
Rothenberg	Tilt D	October 24, 2014
Sabato's Crystal Ball	Lean D	October 30, 2014
RCP	Lean D	November 2, 2014
Daily Kos Elections	Tilt D	November 4, 2014

==== Results ====
Massachusetts's 6th congressional district, 2014
Party	Candidate	Votes	%
Democratic	Seth Moulton	149,638	55.0
Republican	Richard Tisei	111,989	41.1
Independent	Chris Stockwell	10,373	3.8
n/a	Write-ins	219	0.1
Total votes		272,219	100.0
Democratic hold			

== District 7 ==
2014 Massachusetts's 7th congressional district election
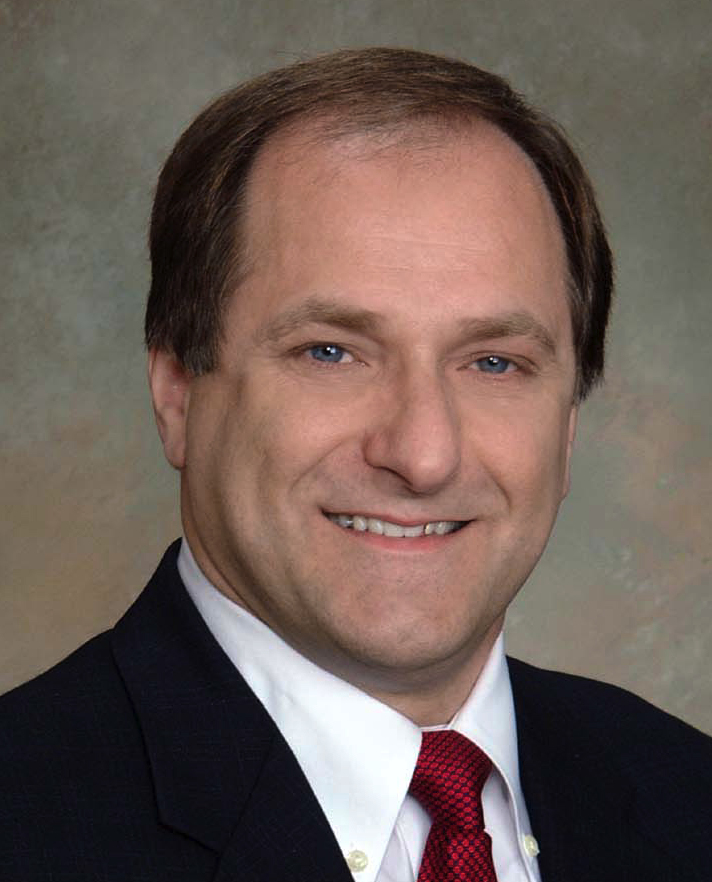
Nominee	Mike Capuano
Party	Democratic
Popular vote	142,133
Percentage	98.3%
- County results Capuano: 90–100%
U.S. Representative before election
Mike Capuano
Democratic
Elected U.S. Representative
Mike Capuano
Democratic

The 7th congressional district is located in eastern Massachusetts. It contains the northern three-quarters of the city of Boston, the city of Somerville and parts of the city of Cambridge. Incumbent Democrat Mike Capuano, who had represented the district since 2013 and previously represented the 8th district from 1999 to 2013, ran for re-election. He was re-elected with 83% of the vote in 2012 and the district had a PVI of D+31.

Capuano considered running for Governor of Massachusetts in the 2014 election, however, he instead chose to run for re-election to the House.

=== Democratic primary ===
==== Candidates ====
===== Nominee =====
- Mike Capuano, incumbent U.S. Representative

=== Green primary ===
==== Candidates ====
===== Disqualified =====
- Jason Lowenthal

=== General election ===
Lowenthal, the only minor party candidate to file to run, was told the 3,000 signatures on his petition were invalid because the petitions he was given and used to collect the signatures were for the primary election, rather than the petition designated for the general election.

==== Predictions ====
Source	Ranking	As of
The Cook Political Report	Safe D	November 3, 2014
Rothenberg	Safe D	October 24, 2014
Sabato's Crystal Ball	Safe D	October 30, 2014
RCP	Safe D	November 2, 2014
Daily Kos Elections	Safe D	November 4, 2014

==== Results ====
Massachusetts's 7th congressional district, 2014
Party	Candidate	Votes	%
Democratic	Mike Capuano (incumbent)	142,133	98.3
n/a	Write-ins	2,413	1.7
Total votes		144,546	100.0
Democratic hold			

== District 8 ==
2014 Massachusetts's 8th congressional district election
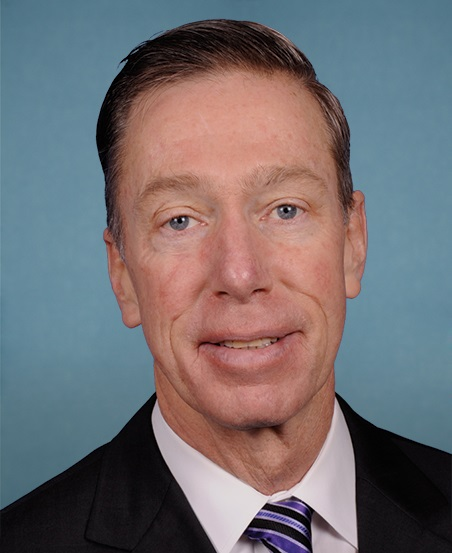
Nominee	Stephen Lynch
Party	Democratic
Popular vote	200,644
Percentage	98.7%
- County results Lynch: 90–100% 100–110%
U.S. Representative before election
Stephen Lynch
Democratic
Elected U.S. Representative
Stephen Lynch
Democratic

The 8th congressional district is located in eastern Massachusetts. It contains the southern quarter of the city of Boston and many of its southern suburbs. Incumbent Democrat Stephen Lynch, who had represented the district since 2013 and previously represented the 9th district from 2001 to 2013, ran for re-election. He was re-elected with 76% of the vote in 2012 and the district had a PVI of D+6.

=== Democratic primary ===
==== Candidates ====
===== Nominee =====
- Stephen Lynch, incumbent U.S. Representative

=== General election ===
==== Predictions ====
Source	Ranking	As of
The Cook Political Report	Safe D	November 3, 2014
Rothenberg	Safe D	October 24, 2014
Sabato's Crystal Ball	Safe D	October 30, 2014
RCP	Safe D	November 2, 2014
Daily Kos Elections	Safe D	November 4, 2014

==== Results ====
Massachusetts's 8th congressional district, 2014
Party	Candidate	Votes	%
Democratic	Stephen Lynch (incumbent)	200,644	98.7
n/a	Write-ins	2,707	1.3
Total votes		203,351	100.0
Democratic hold			

== District 9 ==
2014 Massachusetts's 9th congressional district election
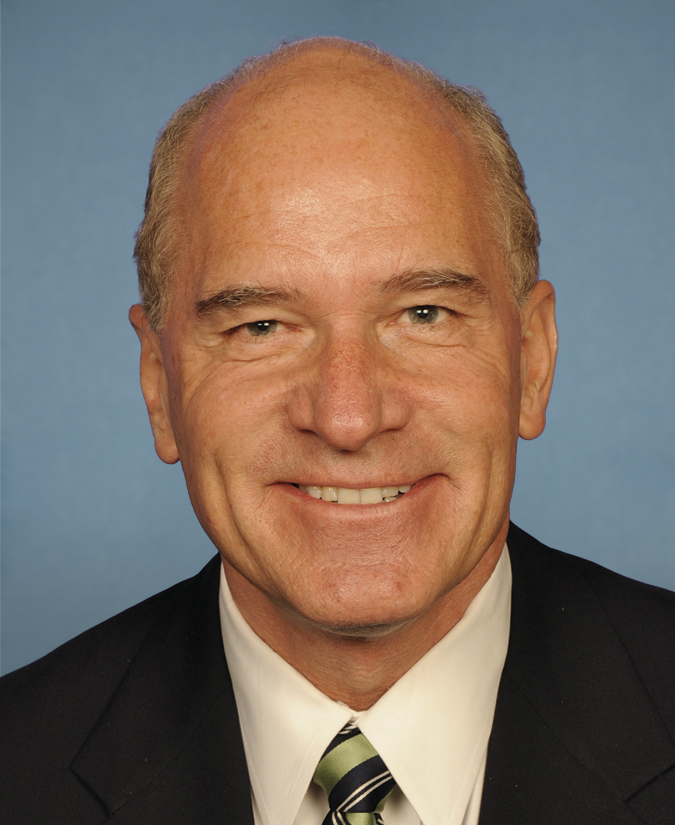

Nominee	Bill Keating	John Chapman
Party	Democratic	Republican
Popular vote	140,413	114,971
Percentage	54.9%	45.0%
- Municipality results Keating: 50–60% 60–70% 70–80% 80–90% >90% Chapman: 50–60% Tie: 50%
U.S. Representative before election
William R. Keating
Democratic
Elected U.S. Representative
William R. Keating
Democratic

The 9th congressional district is located in eastern Massachusetts, including Cape Cod and the South Coast. It contains all of Barnstable, Dukes and Nantucket counties and parts of Bristol and Plymouth counties. Incumbent Democrat Bill Keating, who had represented the district since 2013 and previously represented the 10th district from 2011 to 2013, ran for re-election. He was re-elected with 59% of the vote in 2012 and the district had a PVI of D+5.

=== Democratic primary ===
==== Candidates ====
===== Nominee =====
- Bill Keating, incumbent U.S. Representative

=== Republican primary ===
==== Candidates ====
===== Nominee =====
- John Chapman, former State Industrial Accidents Commissioner, Reagan White House Aide and Attorney

===== Eliminated in primary =====
- Mark Alliegro, biologist
- Vincent Cogliano Jr, Plymouth County GOP Chair
- Dan Shores, attorney

==== Results ====
Republican primary results
Party	Candidate	Votes	%
Republican	John Chapman	9,567	32.3
Republican	Mark Alliegro	9,049	30.6
Republican	Daniel Shores	6,973	23.6
Republican	Vincent Anthony Cogliano, Jr.	3,917	13.2
Republican	All Others	69	0.2
Total votes		29,575	100.0

=== General election ===
==== Polling ====
Poll source	Date(s) administered	Sample size	Margin of error	William R. Keating (D)	John Chapman (R)	Other	Undecided
Emerson College	October 26–29, 2014	400	± 4.85%	46%	41%	13%	
Emerson College	October 6–7, 2014	343	± 5.25%	40%	45%	—	16%

==== Predictions ====
Source	Ranking	As of
The Cook Political Report	Likely D	November 3, 2014
Rothenberg	Likely D	October 24, 2014
Sabato's Crystal Ball	Likely D	October 30, 2014
RCP	Lean D	November 2, 2014
Daily Kos Elections	Likely D	November 4, 2014

==== Results ====
Massachusetts's 9th congressional district, 2014
Party	Candidate	Votes	%
Democratic	Bill Keating (incumbent)	140,413	54.9
Republican	John Chapman	114,971	45.0
n/a	Write-ins	157	0.1
Total votes		255,541	100.0
Democratic hold			
