= Electoral history of Richard Neal =

List of elections featuring Richard Neal as a candidate

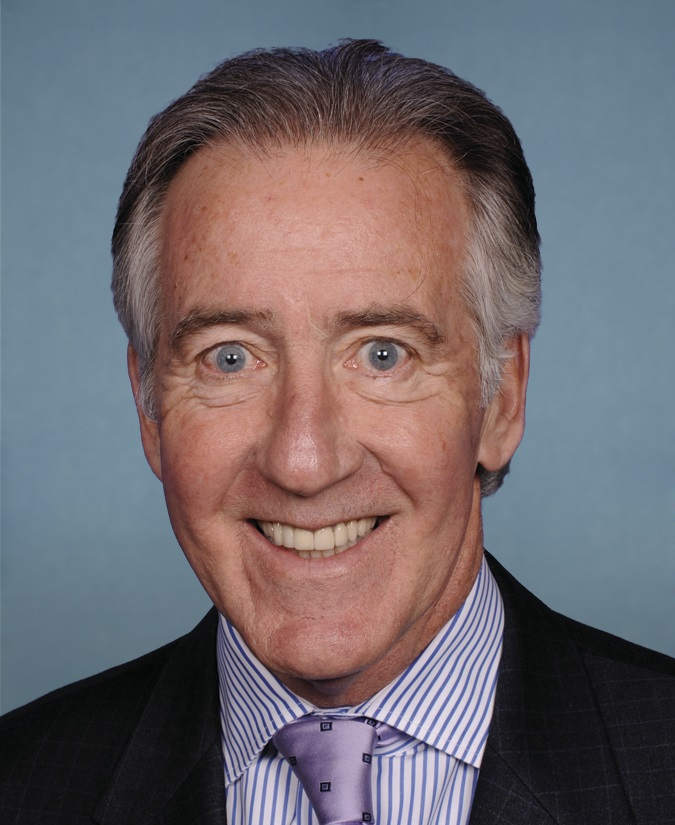
Neal during the 113th Congress

Since 1977, Richard Neal has won 3 city council elections, 3 mayoral elections, and 18 United States House of Representatives elections.

Neal began his career in elected office after winning election in 1977 to the city council of Springfield, Massachusetts. After twice winning reelection to the city council (in 1979 and 1981), Neal was elected mayor of the city in 1983. He was twice reelected mayor, in 1985 and 1987.

In 1988, Neal was elected as a Democrat to represent Massachusetts 2nd district in the United States House of Representatives. He was reelected to this district eleven times. In 2012, he was redistricted to Massachusetts 1st district, to which he was elected. He has been reelected to this district six times, with his latest re-election occurring in 2024.

== City council elections ==
=== 1977 ===
1977 Springfield city councilors at-large election
Candidates	Primary		General election	
	Votes	%	Votes	%
Vincent Di Monaco	9,507	7.39	16,174	8.34
Paul M. Kalill	8,702	6.77	15,552	8.02
Richard E. Neal	6,875	5.35	13,416	6.92
Philip A. Contant	5,689	4.43	12,867	6.63
Leonard J. Collamore	7,756	6.03	12,781	6.59
Paul R. Mason	6,169	4.80	12,624	6.51
Thomas J. Costello III	5,903	4.59	11,974	6.17
Rose Marie Coughlin	6,324	4.92	11,821	6.09
Robert T. Markel	3,881	3.02	11,414	5.88
James H. Bloom	6,572	5.11	11,359	5.86
Daniel M. Walsh III	5,972	4.65	10,638	5.48
James A. Murray	5,397	4.20	10,165	5.24
Donald C. Keavany	2,893	2.25	9,001	4.64
Peter J. Jurzynski	4,606	3.58	8,637	4.45
Romeo J. Cyr	4,993	3.88	8,171	4.21
Daniel J. Manning	3,880	3.02	6,611	3.41
Daniel E. O'Malley	3,769	2.93	6,485	3.34
Thomas J. Costello III	2,893	2.25	4,319	2.23
Francis P. Coughlin	2,866	2.23		
Edward F. Cass	2,624	2.04		
Sidney Chet Chernice	2,439	1.90		
Theodore Piwowarczyk	1,892	1.47		
Millicent V. Abner	1,827	1.42		
Candice Early Lopes	1,625	1.26		
Joseph B. Flynn Jr	1,594	1.24		
Edward T. Sullivan	1,544	1.20		
John A. Wanat	1,496	1.16		
William A. Grant	1,421	1.11		
Philip J. Glarneau	1,328	1.03		
Sidney Silverman	978	0.76		
Robert J. Wihbey	957	0.74		
George Williams	949	0.74		
August Lucia	897	0.70		
Paul Sacharczyk	894	0.70		
Joseph H. Kirby	538	0.42		
Archibald Strong	473	0.37		
David J. Peterson	453	0.35		
Hindes	1	0.00		
Total	128,577	100	194,009	100

=== 1979 ===
1979 Springfield city councilors at-large election
Candidates	Votes	%
Richard E. Neal	15,902	9.93
Vincent DiMonaco	15,020	9.38
Brian Santaniello	14,828	9.26
Rose Marie Coughlin	14,420	9.00
Mary Hurley	13,337	8.33
Philip A. Contant	12,993	8.11
Robert T. Markel	11,679	7.29
Paul R. Mason	11,425	7.13
Peter J. Jurzynski	10,300	6.43
Phillip Hart	10,096	6.30
Morris Jones	6,358	3.97
Cesar Ruiz, Jr.	6,337	3.96
Thomas M. Moriarty	4,884	3.05
Daniel J. Manning	4,692	2.93
Thomas A. Bridges	3,243	2.02
Philip J. Galarneau	3,056	1.90
Alfred J. Rivers	1,634	1.02
Total	160,204	100

=== 1981 ===
1981 Springfield city councilors at-large election
Candidates	Primary		General election	
	Votes	%	Votes	%
Richard E. Neal	13,109	9.63	24,452	9.59
Mary Hurley	11,451	8.41	22,032	8.64
Vincent Dimonaco	10,903	8.01	21,790	8.55
Brian A. Santaniello	10,796	7.93	21,360	8.38
Rose Marie Coughlin	10,628	7.81	20,278	7.96
Andrew M. Scibelli	10,583	7.77	19,176	7.52
Robert T. Markel	8,656	6.36	18,618	7.30
Philip A. Contant	9,217	6.77	18,490	7.25
Paul R. Mason	9,879	7.26	17,103	6.71
Francis W. Bloom	7,295	5.36	16,801	6.59
Nicola "Nick" Gioscia	5,602	4.12	11,637	4.57
Michael F. Crowley	6,653	4.89	11,414	4.48
Miguel Rivas Jr.	3,881	2.85	7,349	2.88
Morris Jones	4,882	3.59	6,689	2.62
Harold F. Langford Jr.	3,237	2.38	6,113	2.40
Floyd Narcisse	3,277	2.41	5,390	2.12
Ernest R. Duteau	1,719	1.26	3,197	1.25
Alferd J. Rivers	1,560	1.15	3,031	1.19
Normand W. Oliver	1,552	1.14		
Lewis M. Brown	1,255	0.92		
Total	136,135	100	254,911	100

== Mayoral elections ==
=== 1983 ===
1983 Springfield, Massachusetts mayoral election
Candidates	Primary		General election	
	Votes	%	Votes	%
Richard E. Neal	11,315	85.58	25,462	85.34
William G. Montana	1,113	8.42	4,373	14.66
Joseph D. Harrington	793	6.00		
Total	13,221	100	29,835	100

=== 1985 ===
1985 Springfield, Massachusetts mayoral election
Candidate	Votes	%
Richard E. Neal (incumbent)	19,382	92.12
Joseph D. Harrington	1,658	7.88
Total votes	21,040	100

=== 1987 ===
1987 Springfield, Massachusetts mayoral election
Candidate	Votes	%
Richard E. Neal (incumbent)	20,612	91.65
Joseph D. Harrington	1,879	8.36
Total votes	22,491	100

== Congressional elections ==
General election summary table

U.S. House, Massachusetts' 2nd congressional district general elections
Year	Winning candidate	Party	Pct	Opponent	Party	Pct	Opponent	Party	Pct	Opponent	Party	Pct	Opponent	Party	Pct
1988	Richard E. Neal	Democratic	80.23%	Mark Augusti	Peace, Jobs, Justice	19.75%	Write-ins		0.07%						
1990	Richard E. Neal	Democratic	67.97%	Write-ins		32.01%									
1992	Richard E. Neal	Democratic	53.09%	Anthony W. Ravosa	Republican	31.07%	Thomas R. Sheehan	For the People	15.76%	Write-ins		0.08%			
1994	Richard E. Neal	Democratic	58.52%	John M. Braire	Republican	36.32%	Kate Ross	Natural Law	5.08%	Write-ins		0.08%			
1996	Richard E. Neal	Democratic	71.67%	Mark Steele	Republican	21.94%	Scott Andrichak	Independent	4.04%	Richard Kaynor	Natural Law	2.25%	Write-ins		0.10%
1998	Richard E. Neal	Democratic	98.94%	Write-ins		1.06%									
2000	Richard E. Neal	Democratic	98.91%	Write-ins		1.09%									
2002	Richard E. Neal	Democratic	99.13%	Write-ins		0.87%									
2004	Richard E. Neal	Democratic	98.73%	Write-ins		1.27%									
2006	Richard E. Neal	Democratic	99.27%	Write-ins		0.73%									
2008	Richard E. Neal	Democratic	98.47%	Write-ins		1.53%									
2010	Richard E. Neal	Democratic	57.32%	Thomas A. Wesley	Republican	42.61%	Write-ins		0.08%						
U.S. House, Massachusetts' 1st congressional district general elections
Year	Winning candidate	Party	Pct	Opponent	Party	Pct	Opponent	Party	Pct	Opponent	Party	Pct			
2012	Richard E. Neal	Democratic	98.42%	Write-ins		1.58%									
2014	Richard E. Neal	Democratic	98.45%	Write-ins		1.55%									
2016	Richard E. Neal	Democratic	73.34%	Frederick O. Mayock	Independent	17.88%	Thomas T. Simmons	Libertarian	8.56%	Write-ins		0.22%			
2018	Richard E. Neal	Democratic	97.64%	Write-ins		2.36%									
2020	Richard E. Neal	Democratic	96.51%	Alex Morse	Write-in	0.45%	Other write-ins		3.04%						
2022	Richard E. Neal	Democratic	59.97	Dean Martilli	Republican	37.32	Other write-ins		0.14%						
2024	Richard E. Neal	Democratic	62.37	Nadia Milleron	Independent	37.30	Other write-ins		0.33%						

=== 1988 ===
1988 Massachusetts's 2nd congressional district Democratic primary
Party	Candidate	Votes	%
Democratic	Richard E. Neal	24,523	99.93
Write-in	Other	18	0.07
Total votes		24,541	100

1988 Massachusetts's 2nd congressional district election
Party	Candidate	Votes	%
Democratic	Richard E. Neal	156,262	80.23
Peace, Jobs Justice	Louis R. Godena	38,466	19.75
Write-in	Other	52	0.03
Total votes		194,780	100

=== 1990 ===
1990 Massachusetts's 2nd congressional district Democratic primary
Party	Candidate	Votes	%
Democratic	Richard E. Neal (incumbent)	51,615	63.61
Democratic	Theodore E. DiMauro	29,520	36.38
Write-in	Other	5	0.01
Total votes		81,140	100

1990 Massachusetts's 2nd congressional district election
Party	Candidate	Votes	%
Democratic	Richard E. Neal (incumbent)	134,152	67.97
Write-in	Other	63,169	32.01
Total votes		197,321	100

=== 1992 ===
1992 Massachusetts's 2nd congressional district Democratic primary
Party	Candidate	Votes	%
Democratic	Richard E. Neal (incumbent)	30,370	47.72
Democratic	Kateri B. Walsh	21,709	34.11
Democratic	Charles A. Platten, Jr.	11,513	18.09
Write-in	Other	49	0.08
Total votes		63,641	100

1992 Massachusetts's 2nd congressional district election
Party	Candidate	Votes	%
Democratic	Richard E. Neal (incumbent)	131,215	53.09
Republican	Anthony W. Ravosa	76,795	31.07
For the People	Thomas R. Sheehan	38,963	15.76
Write-in	Other	190	0.08
Total votes		247,163	100

=== 1994 ===
1994 Massachusetts's 2nd congressional district Democratic primary
Party	Candidate	Votes	%
Democratic	Richard E. Neal (incumbent)	25,472	99.82
Write-in	Other	46	0.18
Total votes		25,518	100

1994 Massachusetts's 2nd congressional district election
Party	Candidate	Votes	%
Democratic	Richard E. Neal (incumbent)	117,178	58.52
Republican	John M. Braire	72,732	36.32
Natural Law	Kate Ross	10,167	5.08
Write-in	Other	161	0.08
Total votes		200,238	100

=== 1996 ===
1996 Massachusetts's 2nd congressional district Democratic primary
Party	Candidate	Votes	%
Democratic	Richard E. Neal (incumbent)	11,048	99.01
Write-in	Other	111	1.00
Total votes		11,159	100

1996 Massachusetts's 2nd congressional district election
Party	Candidate	Votes	%
Democratic	Richard E. Neal (incumbent)	162,995	71.67
Republican	Mark Steele	49,885	21.94
Independent	Scott Andrichak	9,181	4.04
Natural Law	Richard Kaynor	5,124	2.25
Write-in	Other	226	0.10
Total votes		227,411	100

=== 1998 ===
1998 Massachusetts's 2nd congressional district Democratic primary
Party	Candidate	Votes	%
Democratic	Richard E. Neal (incumbent)	30,785	99.45
Write-in	Other	169	0.55
Total votes		30,954	100

1998 Massachusetts's 2nd congressional district election
Party	Candidate	Votes	%
Democratic	Richard E. Neal (incumbent)	130,550	98.94
Write-in	Other	1,393	1.06
Total votes		131,943	100

=== 2000 ===
2000 Massachusetts's 2nd congressional district Democratic primary
Party	Candidate	Votes	%
Democratic	Richard E. Neal (incumbent)	20,253	86.45
Democratic	Joseph R. Fountain	3,149	13.44
Write-in	Other	26	0.11
Total votes		23,428	100

2000 Massachusetts's 2nd congressional district election
Party	Candidate	Votes	%
Democratic	Richard E. Neal (incumbent)	196,670	98.91
Write-in	Other	2,176	1.09
Total votes		198,846	100

=== 2002 ===
2002 Massachusetts's 2nd congressional district Democratic primary
Party	Candidate	Votes	%
Democratic	Richard E. Neal (incumbent)	47,369	99.45
Write-in	Other	260	0.55
Total votes		47,629	100

2002 Massachusetts's 2nd congressional district election
Party	Candidate	Votes	%
Democratic	Richard E. Neal (incumbent)	153,387	99.13
Write-in	Other	1,341	0.87
Total votes		154,728	100

=== 2004 ===
2004 Massachusetts's 2nd congressional district Democratic primary
Party	Candidate	Votes	%
Democratic	Richard E. Neal (incumbent)	29,707	99.14
Write-in	Other	259	0.55
Total votes		29,966	100

2004 Massachusetts's 2nd congressional district election
Party	Candidate	Votes	%
Democratic	Richard E. Neal (incumbent)	217,682	98.73
Write-in	Other	2,802	1.27
Total votes		220,484	100

=== 2006 ===
2006 Massachusetts's 2nd congressional district Democratic primary
Party	Candidate	Votes	%
Democratic	Richard E. Neal (incumbent)	60,953	99.27
Write-in	Other	446	0.73
Total votes		61,399	100

2006 Massachusetts's 2nd congressional district election
Party	Candidate	Votes	%
Democratic	Richard E. Neal (incumbent)	164,939	98.65
Write-in	Other	2,254	1.35
Total votes		167,193	100

=== 2008 ===
2008 Massachusetts's 2nd congressional district Democratic primary
Party	Candidate	Votes	%
Democratic	Richard E. Neal (incumbent)	30,017	98.82
Write-in	Other	360	1.19
Total votes		30,377	100

2008 Massachusetts's 2nd congressional district election
Party	Candidate	Votes	%
Democratic	Richard E. Neal (incumbent)	234,369	98.47
Write-in	Other	3,631	1.53
Total votes		238,000	100

=== 2010 ===
2010 Massachusetts's 2nd congressional district Democratic primary
Party	Candidate	Votes	%
Democratic	Richard E. Neal (incumbent)	31,053	98.68
Write-in	Other	416	1.32
Total votes		31,469	100

2010 Massachusetts's 2nd congressional district election
Party	Candidate	Votes	%
Democratic	Richard E. Neal (incumbent)	122,708	57.32
Republican	Thomas A. Wesley	91,209	42.61
Write-in	Other	164	0.08
Total votes		214,081	100

=== 2012 ===
2012 Massachusetts's 1st congressional district Democratic primary
Party	Candidate	Votes	%
Democratic	Richard Neal (redistricted incumbent)	40,295	65.40
Democratic	Andrea F. Nuciforo, Jr.	15,159	24.63
Democratic	Bill Shein	6,059	9.85
Write-in	Other	33	0.05
Total votes		61,546	100

2012 Massachusetts's 1st congressional district election
Party	Candidate	Votes	%
Democratic	Richard E. Neal (redistricted incumbent)	261,936	98.42
Write-in	Other	4,197	1.58
Total votes		266,133	100

=== 2014 ===
2016 Massachusetts's 1st congressional district Democratic primary
Party	Candidate	Votes	%
Democratic	Richard Neal (incumbent)	44,857	98.45
Write-in	Other	706	1.55
Total votes		45,563	100

2014 Massachusetts's 1st congressional district election
Party	Candidate	Votes	%
Democratic	Richard E. Neal (incumbent)	167,612	97.97
Write-in	Other	3,498	2.04
Total votes		171,110	100

=== 2016 ===
2016 Massachusetts's 1st congressional district Democratic primary
Party	Candidate	Votes	%
Democratic	Richard Neal (incumbent)	44,857	98.45
Write-in	Other	706	1.55
Total votes		45,563	100

2016 Massachusetts's 1st congressional district election
Party	Candidate	Votes	%
Democratic	Richard E. Neal (incumbent)	235,803	73.34
Independent	Frederick O. Mayock	57,504	17.88
Libertarian	Thomas T. Simmons	27,511	8.56
Write-in	Other	721	0.22
Total votes		321,539	100

=== 2018 ===
2018 Massachusetts's 1st congressional district Democratic primary
Party	Candidate	Votes	%
Democratic	Richard Neal (incumbent)	49,696	70.64
Democratic	Tahirah Amatul-Wadud	20,565	29.23
Write-in	Other	93	0.13
Total votes		70,354	100

2018 Massachusetts's 1st congressional district election
Party	Candidate	Votes	%
Democratic	Richard E. Neal (incumbent)	211,790	97.64
Write-in	Other	5,110	2.36
Total votes		216,900	100

=== 2020 ===
2020 Massachusetts's 1st congressional district Democratic primary
Party	Candidate	Votes	%
Democratic	Richard E. Neal (incumbent)	84,092	58.64
Democratic	Alex Morse	59,110	41.22
Write-in	Other	191	0.13
Total votes		143,393	100

2020 Massachusetts's 1st congressional district election
Party	Candidate	Votes	%
Democratic	Richard E. Neal (incumbent)	275,376	96.51
Write-in	Alex Morse	1,274	0.45
Write-in	Other	8,682	3.04
Total votes		285,332	100

=== 2022 ===
2022 Massachusetts's 1st congressional district Democratic primary
Party	Candidate	Votes	%
Democratic	Richard E. Neal (incumbent)	71,928	99.16
Write-in	Other	606	0.84
Total votes		72,534	100

2022 Massachusetts's 1st congressional district election
Party	Candidate	Votes	%
Democratic	Richard E. Neal (incumbent)	157,635	59.97
Republican	Dean Martilli	98,386	37.32
Write-in		378	0.14
Total votes		263,651	100

=== 2024 ===
2024 Massachusetts's 1st congressional district Democratic primary
Party	Candidate	Votes	%
Democratic	Richard E. Neal (incumbent)	56,364	99.07
Write-in		528	0.92
Total votes		56,892	100

2024 Massachusetts's 1st congressional district election
Party	Candidate	Votes	%
Democratic	Richard E. Neal (incumbent)	223,325	62.37
Independent	Nadia Milleron	133,552	37.30
Write-in		1,181	0.33
Total votes		358,058	100

=== 2026 ===
2026 Massachusetts's 1st congressional district Democratic primary
Party	Candidate	Votes	%
Democratic	Richard E. Neal (incumbent)	49,927	53.95
Democratic	Jeromie Whalen	42,488	45.91
Write-in		126	0.14
Total votes		92,541	100
