= Richard Neal =

American politician (born 1949)

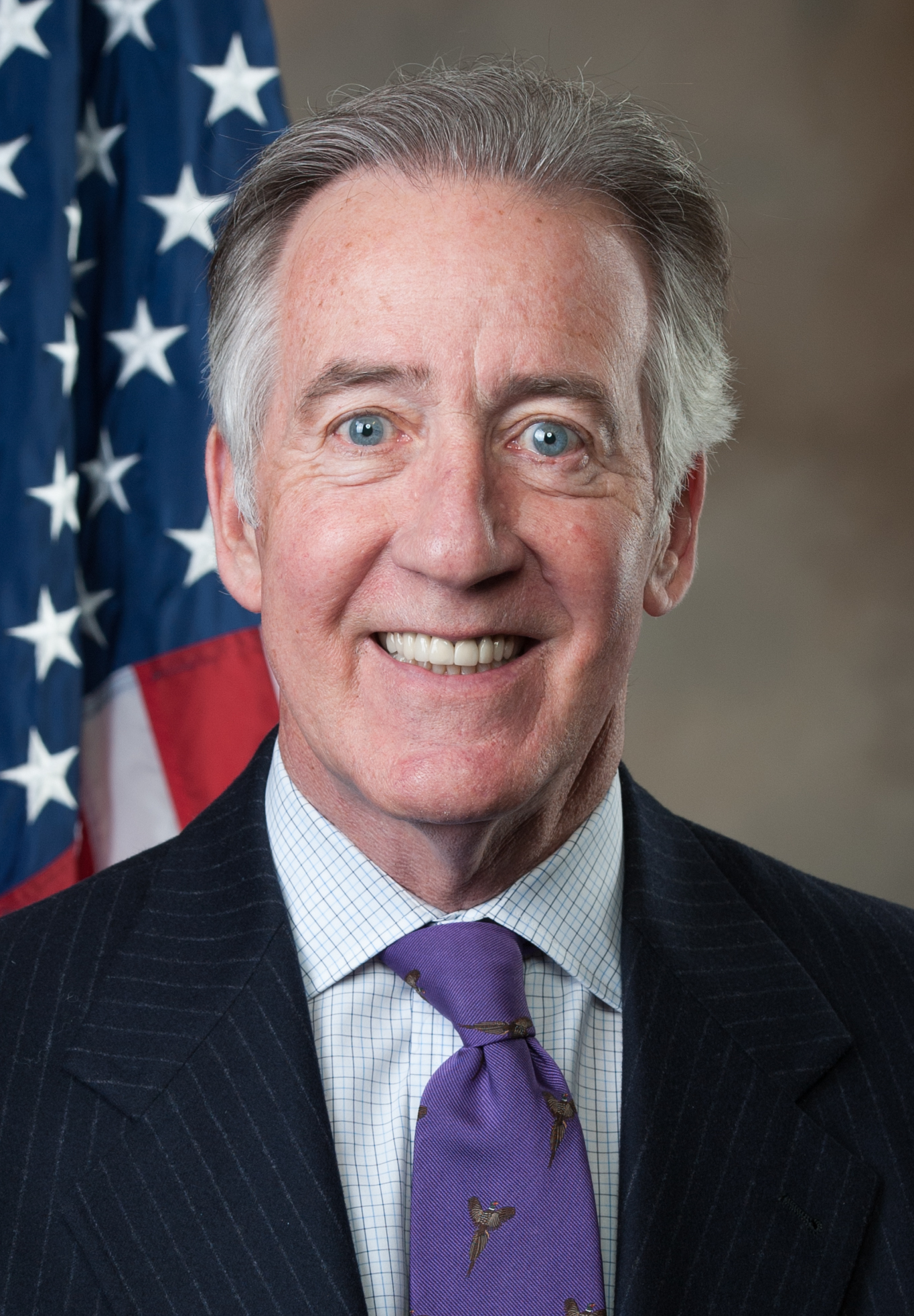
- Official portrait, 2012

Ranking Member of the House Ways and Means Committee
- Incumbent
- Assumed office January 3, 2023
- Preceded by: Kevin Brady
- In office January 3, 2017 – January 3, 2019
- Preceded by: Sander Levin
- Succeeded by: Kevin Brady

Chair of the House Ways and Means Committee
- In office January 3, 2019 – January 3, 2023
- Preceded by: Kevin Brady
- Succeeded by: Jason Smith

Member of the U.S. House of Representatives from Massachusetts
- Incumbent
- Assumed office January 3, 1989
- Preceded by: Edward Boland
- Constituency: 2nd district (1989–2013); 1st district (2013–present)

50th Mayor of Springfield
- In office January 2, 1984 – January 3, 1989
- Preceded by: Theodore Dimauro
- Succeeded by: Mary Hurley

Member of the Springfield City Council
- In office January 1978 – January 1984

Personal details
- Born: Richard Edmund Neal; February 14, 1949 (age 77) Worcester, Massachusetts, U.S.
- Party: Democratic
- Spouse: Maureen Conway (m. 1975; died 2025)
- Children: 4
- Education: Holyoke Community College (attended); American International College (BA); University of Hartford (MA)
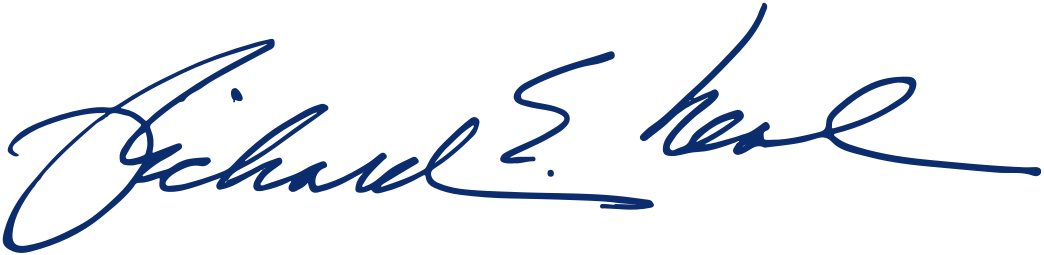
- Signature
- Website: House website Campaign website
- Neal's voice Neal supporting the Build Back Better Act. Recorded November 18, 2021

Richard Edmund Neal (born February 14, 1949) is an American politician serving as the U.S. representative for Massachusetts's 1st congressional district since 1989. The district, numbered as the 2nd district from 1989 to 2013, includes Springfield, West Springfield, Pittsfield, Holyoke, Agawam, Chicopee, and Westfield. A member of the Democratic Party, Neal has been the dean of Massachusetts's delegation to the United States House of Representatives since 2013, and is dean of the New England House delegations.

Neal was the president of the Springfield City Council from 1979 to 1983 and the mayor of Springfield from 1983 to 1989. He was nearly unopposed when he ran for the House of Representatives in 1988, and took office in 1989.

Neal chaired the House Ways and Means Committee from 2019 to 2023 and chaired the Subcommittee on Select Revenue Measures. He has also dedicated much of his career to U.S.–Ireland relations and maintaining American involvement in the Northern Ireland peace process, for which he has won several acclamations. In January 2020, Neal was inducted into the Irish American Hall of Fame.

== Early life, education, and academic career ==
Richard Edmund Neal was born in 1949, in Worcester, Massachusetts, the oldest of three children of Mary H. (Garvey) and Edmund John Neal. He and his two younger sisters were raised in Springfield by their mother, a housewife, and their father, a custodian at MassMutual. Neal's maternal grandparents were from Northern Ireland and his paternal grandparents were from Ireland. Neal's mother died when he was 13, and he was attending Springfield Technical High School when his father died. Neal and his two younger sisters moved in with their grandmother and later their aunt, relying on Social Security checks as they grew up.

After graduating from high school, Neal attended Holyoke Community College in Holyoke, Massachusetts, and then American International College in Springfield, with the assistance of survivor's benefits. He graduated in 1972 with a Bachelor of Arts in political science. He then attended the University of Hartford's Barney School of Business and Public Administration, where he was a member of Tau Kappa Epsilon fraternity, graduating in 1976 with a Master of Arts in public administration. Early in his career Neal taught history at Cathedral High School.

== Local government ==
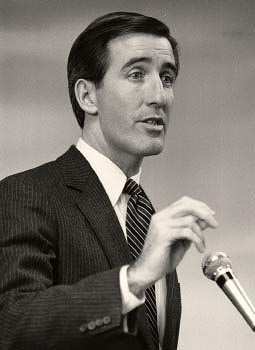
Neal during his tenure as Mayor of Springfield

Neal began his political career as co-chairman of Democratic presidential candidate George McGovern's 1972 election campaign in Western Massachusetts. In 1973 he became an assistant to Springfield Mayor William C. Sullivan. Neal was elected to the Springfield City Council in 1978 and was named President of the City Council in 1979. The following year he was named as a delegate for presidential candidate Ted Kennedy at the 1980 Democratic National Convention. While a city councilor, Neal taught history at Cathedral High School, and gave lectures at Springfield College, American International College, Springfield Technical Community College, and Western New England College.

In 1983, Neal made plans to challenge Theodore Dimauro, the Democratic incumbent mayor of Springfield. The pressure led Dimauro to retire and Neal was elected mayor. Neal was reelected in 1985 and 1987. As mayor, Neal oversaw a period of significant economic growth, with over $400 million of development and investment in the city, and a surplus in the city budget. He worked to strengthen Springfield's appearance, pushing to revive and preserve the city's historic homes and initiating a Clean City Campaign to reduce litter.

== U.S. House of Representatives ==
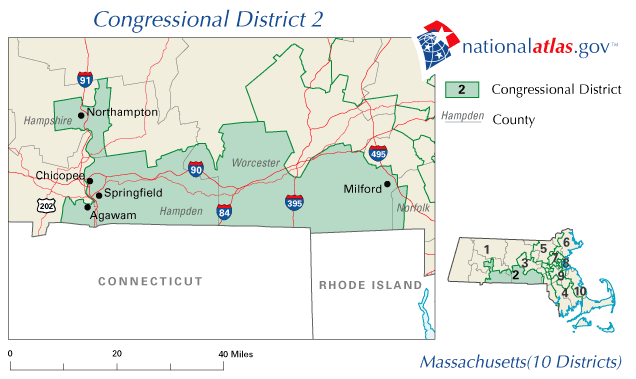
The 2nd congressional district of Massachusetts from 2003 to 2013

=== Elections ===
Neal ran for the United States House of Representatives in Massachusetts's 2nd congressional district in 1988 after 18-term Democratic incumbent Edward Boland retired. Boland had alerted Neal of his impending retirement, giving him a head start on his campaign. Neal raised $200,000 in campaign contributions and collected signatures across the district before the retirement was formally announced. He was unopposed in the Democratic primary, and his only general election opponent was Communist Party candidate Louis R. Godena, whom he defeated with over 80 percent of the vote.

Neal has won reelection every two years since. Former Springfield mayor Theodore Dimauro, reflecting sentiments that Neal had an unfair advantage in the previous election, ran as a challenger in the 1990 Democratic primary. Dimauro's campaign was sullied by a false rumor he spread about the Bank of New England's financial situation, and Neal won the primary easily. He was unopposed in the general election, winning 68 percent of the vote. In 1992, his popularity was threatened by the House banking scandal, in which he had made dozens of unpenalized overdrafts at the House Bank. After narrowly defeating two Democratic opponents, he was challenged by Republican Anthony W. Ravosa Jr., and Independent Thomas R. Sheehan. Neal won with 53 percent of the vote.

In a Springfield Union-News poll taken in mid-October 1994, Neal was ahead of John Briare by only 6 percentage points. Neal went on to spend nearly $500,000 in the last two weeks of the campaign to defeat Briare. The 1994 general election also featured a third-party candidate, Kate Ross, who received 6% of the vote. Neal received 59% of the vote in 1994.

Since 1994 Neal has had little electoral opposition. He was challenged by Mark Steele in 1996 and easily dispatched him with 71 percent of the vote and ran unopposed in 1998. In 2000 he won the Democratic primary against Joseph R. Fountain, who challenged Neal's positions as "anti-choice" and "anti-gun". Neal had been unopposed in the general election since 1996, but faced Republican opponent Tom Wesley in the 2010 U.S. congressional elections, which Neal won by a margin of 57% to 43%.

For his first 12 terms in Congress, Neal represented a district centered on Springfield and stretching as far east as the southern and western suburbs of Worcester. When Massachusetts lost a congressional district after the 2010 census, the bulk of Neal's territory, including his home in Springfield, was merged with the 1st district, held by fellow Democrat John Olver. While it retained Olver's district number, it was geographically and demographically more Neal's district; it now covered almost all of the Springfield metropolitan area. The prospect of an incumbent vs. incumbent contest was averted when Olver retired. The new 1st was no less Democratic than the old 2nd, and Neal was reelected without much difficulty in 2012, 2014 and 2016.

==== 2018 ====
In the 2018 Democratic primary, Neal defeated Springfield attorney Tahirah Amatul-Wadud, 70.7% to 29.3%. In the final days of the campaign Neal had $3.1 million in the bank to Amatul-Wadud's $20,000. Neal ran unopposed in the general election, winning a sixteenth term in the U.S. House.

==== 2020 ====
Holyoke mayor Alex Morse unsuccessfully challenged Neal in the 2020 Democratic primary election. In the 2020 election, Neal received the most PAC money of any candidate: $3.1 million out of his $4.9 million total raised. Neal was unopposed in the general election, winning a seventeenth term in the U.S. House.

==== 2022 ====
Neal ran for an eighteenth term and defeated Republican Dean Martilli in the general election, winning 61.4% of the vote.

==== 2024 ====
Neal ran for a nineteenth term and defeated independent candidate Nadia Milleron in the general election, winning 62.4% of the vote.

==== 2026 ====
Jeromie Whalen unsuccessfully challenged Neal in the primary for his bid for a twentieth term. The general election was a rematch with independent candidate Nadia Milleron in which Neal won by a larger margin.

==== Electoral history ====
Electoral history of Richard Neal
Year	Office		Party	Primary			General			Result	Swing	Ref.
Year	Office		Party	Total	%	P.	Total	%	P.	Result	Swing	Ref.
1983	Mayor of Springfield		Democratic	11,315	85.58	1st	25,462	85.34	1st	Won	Hold	
1985	Mayor of Springfield		Democratic	N/A			19,382	92.12	1st	Won	Hold	
1987	Mayor of Springfield		Democratic	N/A			20,612	91.65	1st	Won	Hold	
1988	U.S. House	2nd	Democratic	24,523	99.93	1st	156,262	80.23	1st	Won	Hold	
1990	U.S. House	2nd	Democratic	51,615	63.61	1st	134,152	99.79	1st	Won	Hold	
1992	U.S. House	2nd	Democratic	30,370	47.72	1st	131,215	53.09	1st	Won	Hold	
1994	U.S. House	2nd	Democratic	25,472	99.82	1st	117,178	58.55	1st	Won	Hold	
1996	U.S. House	2nd	Democratic	11,048	99.01	1st	163,010	71.67	1st	Won	Hold	
1998	U.S. House	2nd	Democratic	30,785	99.45	1st	130,550	98.95	1st	Won	Hold	
2000	U.S. House	2nd	Democratic	20,253	86.45	1st	196,670	98.91	1st	Won	Hold	
2002	U.S. House	2nd	Democratic	47,369	99.45	1st	153,387	99.13	1st	Won	Hold	
2004	U.S. House	2nd	Democratic	29,707	99.14	1st	217,682	98.73	1st	Won	Hold	
2006	U.S. House	2nd	Democratic	60,953	99.27	1st	164,939	98.65	1st	Won	Hold	
2008	U.S. House	2nd	Democratic	30,017	98.81	1st	234,369	98.47	1st	Won	Hold	
2010	U.S. House	2nd	Democratic	31,053	98.68	1st	122,751	57.33	1st	Won	Hold	
2012	U.S. House	1st	Democratic	40,295	65.47	1st	261,936	98.42	1st	Won	Hold	
2014	U.S. House	1st	Democratic	43,225	99.07	1st	167,612	97.96	1st	Won	Hold	
2016	U.S. House	1st	Democratic	44,857	98.45	1st	235,803	73.34	1st	Won	Hold	
2018	U.S. House	1st	Democratic	49,696	70.64	1st	211,790	97.64	1st	Won	Hold	
2020	U.S. House	1st	Democratic	84,092	58.64	1st	275,376	96.51	1st	Won	Hold	
2022	U.S. House	1st	Democratic	71,928	99.16	1st	157,635	61.48	1st	Won	Hold	
2024	U.S. House	1st	Democratic	56,364	99.07	1st	223,325	62.37	1st	Won	Hold	
2026	U.S. House	1st	Democratic	49,927	53.95	1st	180,528	65.03	1st	Won	Hold	
Source: Secretary of the Commonwealth of Massachusetts | Election Results

=== Tenure ===
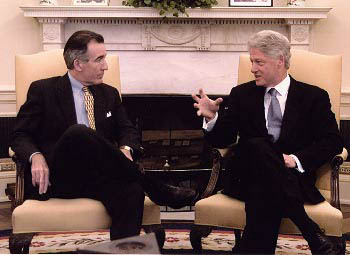
Neal with President Bill Clinton at the White House

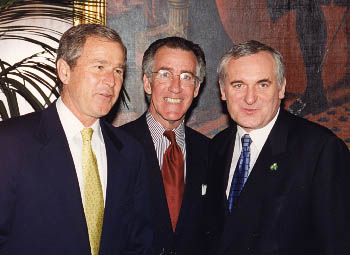
Neal with President George W. Bush and Bertie Ahern in 2002

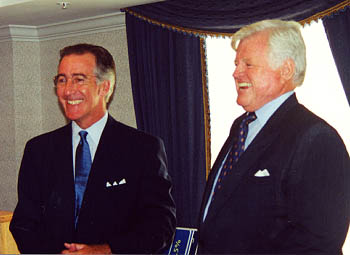
Neal with Senator Ted Kennedy

Neal has a generally liberal political record. He was given a 100 percent "Liberal Quotient" by Americans for Democratic Action (ADA) for his 2008 voting record, and the organization named him one of the year's "ADA Heroes". He was given an 8.19 percent "Lifetime Rating" by the American Conservative Union (ACU) based on his votes from 1989 to 2009. In the 110th United States Congress Neal voted with the Democratic Party leadership on 98.9 percent of bills; in the 111th United States Congress, Neal voted with the Democratic party leadership 95% of the time.

Neal voted with President Joe Biden's stated position 100% of the time in the 117th Congress, according to a FiveThirtyEight analysis.

Neal served as a member of the House Democratic Steering Committee in the 105th Congress and was an at-large whip for the House Democrats. He is a co-chair of the New England Congressional Caucus, a group aiming to advance the regional interests of New England.

==== Economy and budget ====
With several committee posts, Neal has made economic policy the focus of his career, although his success has been mixed. He served his first two terms on the House Banking Committee, where he served on the Financial Services Subcommittee. As the banking reform law of 1991 was being drafted, he cautioned that President George H. W. Bush's proposal could negatively affect small businesses and minority-owned businesses. He introduced an amendment to require reports on lending to these businesses, which was adopted.

In 1993 Neal moved to the House Ways and Means Committee, where he currently serves. He has been chairman of the Subcommittee on Select Revenue Measures since 2008 and is a member of the Subcommittee on Trade. Previously he served on the Oversight and Social Security subcommittees. In the late 2000s analysts considered Neal a likely frontrunner for chairman of the Ways and Means Committee, and in the wake of Charles B. Rangel's 2010 departure he began actively seeking the post. In June 2010, while pursuing the chairmanship, he invited campaign contributors to a $5,000-per-person weekend fundraiser in Cape Cod. This drew fire from The Boston Globe, which criticized him for "[acceding] to the capital's money culture."

According to Congressional Quarterly's Politics in America, one of Neal's longstanding legislative priorities is to simplify the tax code. Neal has long advocated repealing the Alternative Minimum Tax (AMT), believing its effects have reached unreasonably low income brackets. He led an unsuccessful movement to reform the AMT in 2007. In 1998 he successfully pushed to exempt a child tax credit from being affected by the AMT, and in 2001 Congress made the exemption permanent at his urging. He voted against the tax cuts of 2001 and 2003, saying they would force millions onto the AMT. Another priority of Neal's is to eliminate tax "loopholes" that favor higher-income individuals. He was the lead proponent of a bill to require federal contractors to pay federal taxes for workers hired through offshore shell headquarters. The bill, H.R. 6081, passed both houses of Congress unanimously and was signed into law in May 2008.

On trade policy, Neal has a moderate record, supporting lower trade barriers. He voted against the North American Free Trade Agreement (NAFTA) in 1993. In 1995 and 2002 he voted against fast track bills that gave the president the authority to negotiate trade deals without amendments by Congress. In 2007 he voted in favor of the Peru–United States Trade Promotion Agreement despite some Democratic opposition.

Neal is a strong supporter of the Social Security program. He moved from the Trade subcommittee to the Social Security subcommittee in 2005 to challenge President George W. Bush's attempts to partially privatize it. He pushed a proposal to automatically enroll employees in Individual Retirement Accounts (IRAs), and successfully lobbied President Barack Obama to include it in a proposed 2009 budget outline.

In February 2019, Neal came under criticism for failing to promptly exercise his authority as Ways and Means Committee chair to subpoena Donald Trump's tax returns. Citing a need to build a strong case in a potential lawsuit, Neal delayed taking this step until May 2019.

In 2019 the House Ways and Means Committee led by Neal passed a bill that would prohibit the IRS from creating a free electronic tax filing system. During his 2016 and 2018 campaigns, Neal received $16,000 in contributions from Intuit and H&R Block, two tax preparation companies that have lobbied against the creation of free tax filing systems.

For his tenure as the chairman of the House Ways and Means Committee in the 116th Congress, Neal earned an "F" grade from the non-partisan Lugar Center's Congressional Oversight Hearing Index.

==== Foreign policy ====
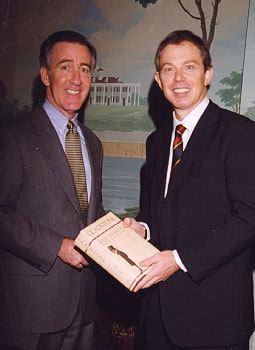
Neal with Tony Blair

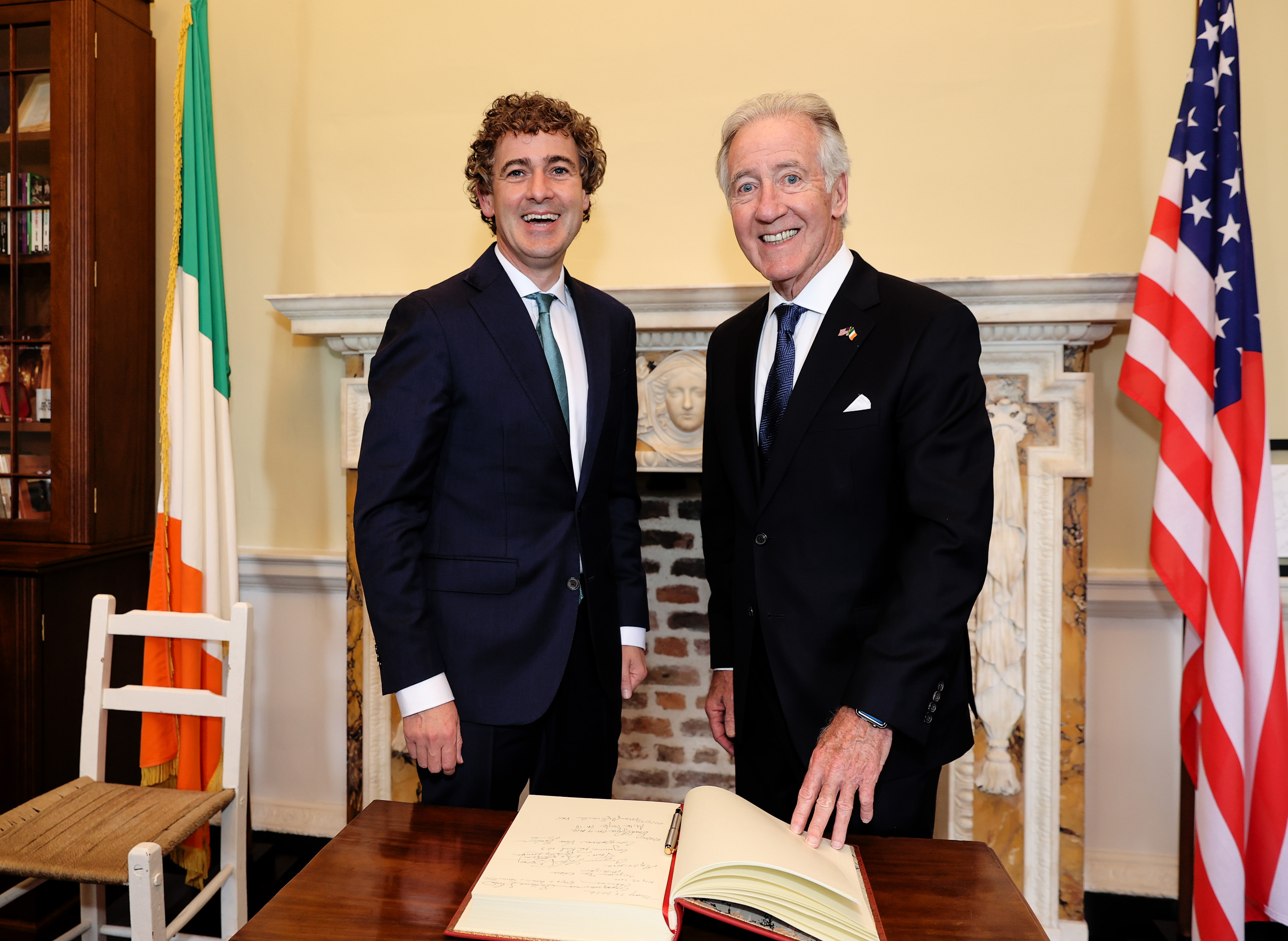
Neal with the deputy chair of the Irish Senate Mark Daly in May 2022 during a visit to the Republic of Ireland

Descended from Irish nationalist grandparents on both sides, Neal has been an advocate for Irish concerns throughout his Congressional career, pushing to keep the United States involved in the Northern Ireland peace process. He is the co-chair of the ad hoc Committee on Irish Affairs, has been chairman of the Friends of Ireland since 2007, and was considered as a candidate for United States Ambassador to Ireland in 1998. After the disarmament of the Irish Republican Army (IRA) in September 2005, Neal was among a group of Congressmen who met with Sinn Féin MP Martin McGuinness to congratulate him on the disarmament and ensure a lasting peace had been reached. Neal invited Sinn Féin President Gerry Adams to the inauguration of Barack Obama in January 2009. Neal has been named as one of the top 100 Irish-Americans by Irish America magazine and received the International Leadership Award from The American Ireland Fund in 2002.

Neal is an opponent of the Iraq War, saying it was based on false intelligence. He voted against the original invasion in 2003 and opposed President Bush's 2006 request to send additional troops. He cited veterans' affairs as his top priority in 2010.

In 2017, Neal backed the Israeli Anti-Boycott Act, aimed to punish companies that boycott Israel.

===== Health care =====
A longtime advocate of health care reform, Neal was involved in the major health care reform efforts of 1993–94 and 2009–10. In working on the unsuccessful Clinton health care plan of 1993, he served the interests of the major health insurance and medical companies in his district, achieving a compromise allowing insurance companies to charge small businesses higher premiums. He was later involved writing the House's 2009 health care reform bill, the Affordable Health Care for America Act. As chairman of the Select Revenue Measures subcommittee, he had a hand in developing the bill's financing plan. He explained that his priorities were to address "pre-existing conditions, capping out-of-pocket expenses and making sure people don't lose their health care if they lose their job". Despite his support for the act, he spoke about his preference for a "piecemeal" approach to health care reform, saying it would allow for a more reasonable debate.

As chairman of the House Ways and Means Committee, before a March 2019 hearing on Medicare for All, Neal told Democrats on the panel that he didn't want the phrase "Medicare for All" to be used. He argued that Medicare for All was wrong on policy and a political loser. In December 2019, some blamed Neal for killing legislation that would have ended surprise medical bills, suspecting it may have been because of industry lobbyist donations to his reelection campaign. As of the 2019–20 election cycle, Neal is third-highest among House members in campaign contributions from the health services/HMO industry. The insurance and pharmaceutical industries are among the top contributors to his campaign committee.

===== Retirement planning =====
Neal introduced the bipartisan SECURE Act of 2019, which contained a number of provisions to expand access to retirement planning options and encourage employers to set up retirement plans for workers. The bill, originally introduced in late March 2019, became law in December 2019 as part of the fiscal year 2020 federal appropriations bill.

===== Ukraine =====
In 2023, Neal was among 49 Democrats to break with President Joe Biden, by voting for a ban on cluster munitions to Ukraine.

===== Abortion =====
Representing a relatively Catholic district, Neal has a more conservative record on abortion than other representatives from Massachusetts. He said in 2010, "I have always opposed taxpayer funding of abortion. I'd keep Roe v. Wade and restrict it. I've always thought: keep abortion, with restrictions for late-term abortion. [Given] the voting pattern I have, both sides would say I'm mixed, and guess what? That's where the American people are." He voted for the Partial-Birth Abortion Ban Act of 2003, which made the intact dilation and extraction abortion procedure illegal in most cases. During debate on the House health care reform bill, he voted in favor of the Stupak–Pitts Amendment to restrict government funding of abortion. In 2021 Neal was listed as an original co-sponsor of the Women's Health Protection Act.

===== Other social issues =====
On other social issues Neal has a moderate record: he supports a proposed Constitutional amendment to ban desecration of the U.S. flag, and has twice voted against an amendment to ban same-sex marriage.

=== Committee assignments ===
- Committee on Ways and Means (Ranking Member)
  - As the chair of the committee, Rep. Neal is entitled to sit as an ex officio member in all subcommittee meetings, per the committee's rules.
- Joint Committee on Taxation

=== Caucus memberships ===
- Congressional Arts Caucus
- Afterschool Caucuses
- U.S.-Japan Caucus
- New England Congressional Caucus (Co-chair)
- Friends of Ireland
- Rare Disease Caucus

== Personal life ==
Neal is a Roman Catholic and lives in Springfield. He was married to his wife Maureen Neal (née Conway) until her death. They had four children. In addition to his duties as a congressman, Neal teaches a journalism course at the University of Massachusetts Amherst called "The Politician and the Journalist".

== See also ==
- Electoral history of Richard Neal

U.S. House of Representatives
Preceded by Edward Boland	Member of the U.S. House of Representatives from Massachusetts's 2nd congressional district 1989–2013	Succeeded by Jim McGovern
Preceded by John Olver	Member of the U.S. House of Representatives from Massachusetts's 1st congressional district 2013–present	Incumbent
Preceded by Sander Levin	Ranking Member of the House Ways and Means Committee; 2017–2019	Succeeded by Kevin Brady
Preceded by Kevin Brady	Chair of the House Ways and Means Committee; 2019–2023	Succeeded by Jason Smith
Preceded by Orrin Hatch	Chair of the Joint Taxation Committee; 2019–2020	Succeeded by Chuck Grassley
Preceded by Chuck Grassley	Chair of the Joint Taxation Committee; 2021–2022	Succeeded by Ron Wyden
Preceded by Kevin Brady	Ranking Member of the House Ways and Means Committee; 2023–present	Incumbent
U.S. order of precedence (ceremonial)
Preceded by Frank Pallone	United States representatives by seniority 7th	Succeeded by Rosa DeLauro
Preceded by Frank Pallone	Order of precedence of the United States	Succeeded by Rosa DeLauro
