= 2006 United States House of Representatives elections in Massachusetts =

- November 7, 2006

All 10 Massachusetts seats in the United States House of Representatives
	Majority party	Minority party
Party	Democratic	Republican
Last election	10	0
Seats won	10	0
Seat change	Steady	Steady
Popular vote	1,632,307	198,550
Percentage	84.85%	10.32%
Swing	▲5.04%	▼6.54%
- Democratic 60–70% 70–80% 90>%

The Massachusetts congressional elections of 2006 were held on Tuesday, November 7, 2006. The terms of all ten representatives to the United States House of Representatives were to expire on January 3, 2007, and therefore all were put up for contest. The winners of the elections served in the 110th United States Congress from January 3, 2007, to January 3, 2009.

== Overview ==
United States House of Representatives elections in Massachusetts, 2006
Party	Votes	Percentage	Seats	+/–
Democratic	1,632,307	84.85%	10	—
Republican	198,550	10.32%	0	—
Independents	92,800	4.82%	0	—
Totals	1,923,657	100.00%	10	—

== District 1 ==
2006 Massachusetts's 1st congressional district election
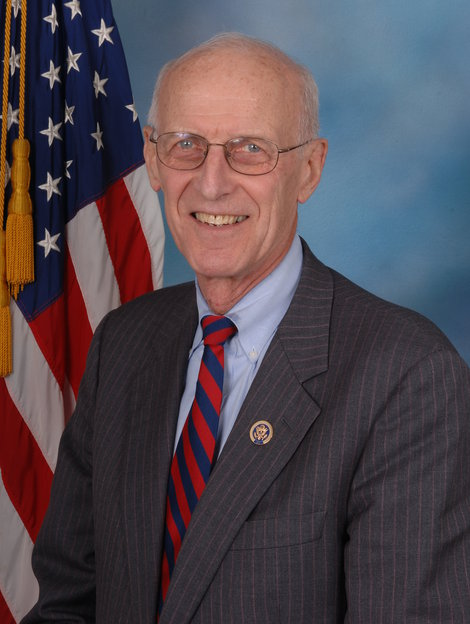

Nominee	John Olver	William H. Szych
Party	Democratic	Independent
Popular vote	158,057	48,574
Percentage	76.4%	23.5%
- County results Olver: 60–70% 70–80% 80–90%
U.S. Representative before election
John Olver
Democratic
Elected U.S. Representative
John Olver
Democratic

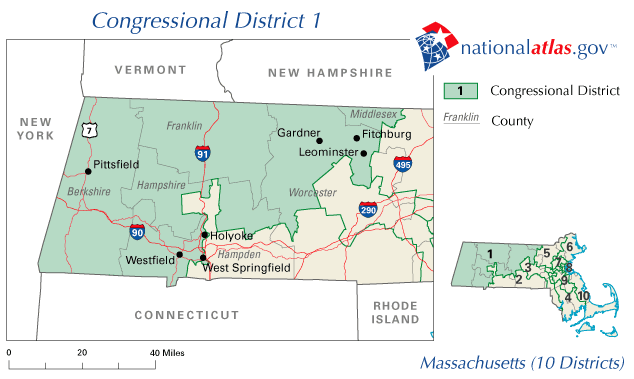

In this solidly liberal district based in western Massachusetts, incumbent Democratic Congressman John Olver ran for a ninth term in Congress. Olver faced independent candidate William Szych in the general election, whom he handily defeated to return to Congress for another term.

=== Predictions ===
Source	Ranking	As of
The Cook Political Report	Safe D	November 6, 2006
Rothenberg	Safe D	November 6, 2006
Sabato's Crystal Ball	Safe D	November 6, 2006
Real Clear Politics	Safe D	November 7, 2006
CQ Politics	Safe D	November 7, 2006

Massachusetts's 1st congressional district election, 2006
Party	Candidate	Votes	%
Democratic	John Olver (incumbent)	158,057	76.40
Independent	William H. Szych	48,574	23.48
Write-ins		253	0.12
Total votes		206,884	100.00
Democratic hold			

== District 2 ==
2006 Massachusetts's 2nd congressional district election
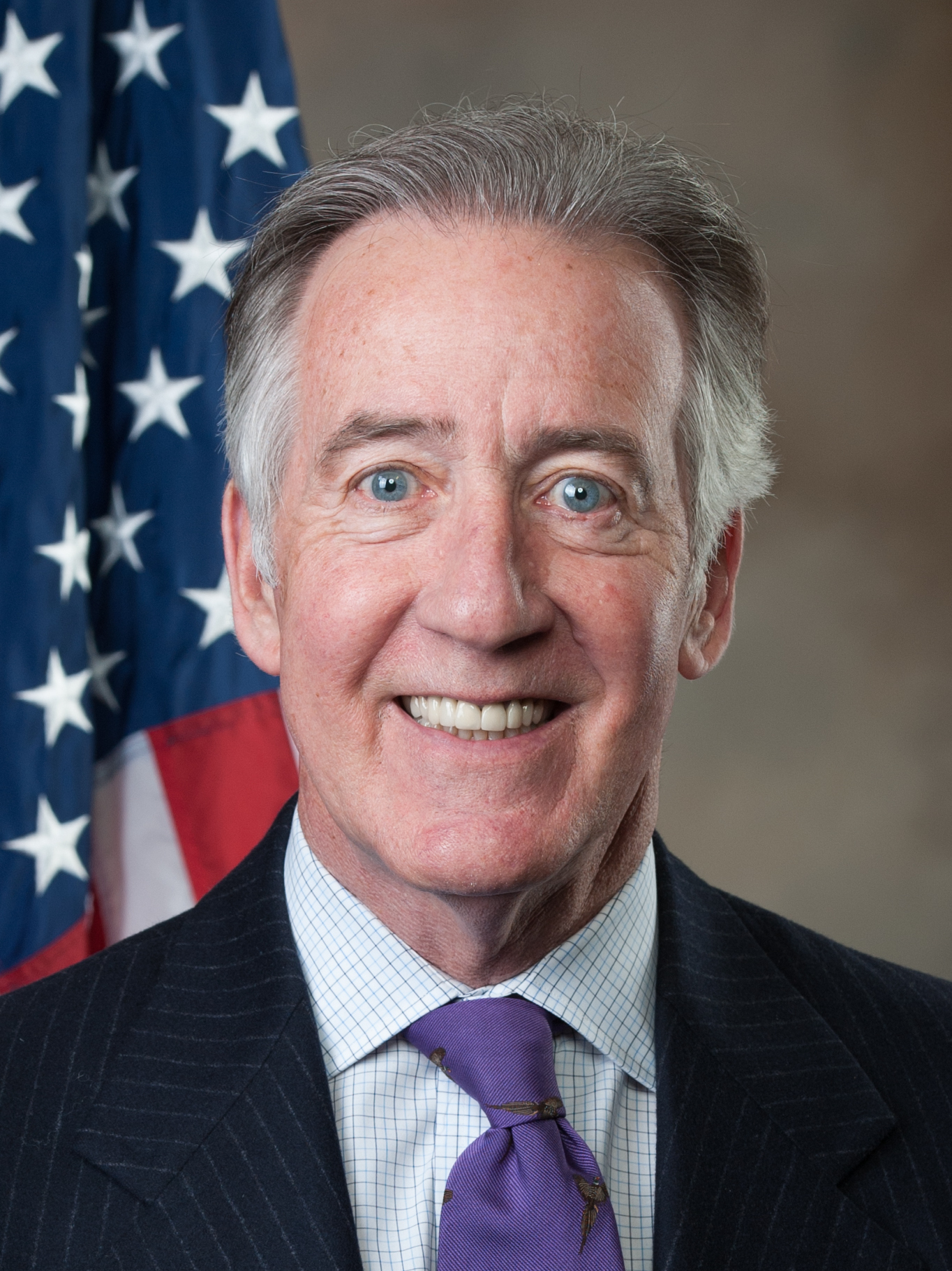
Nominee	Richard Neal
Party	Democratic
Popular vote	164,939
Percentage	98.7%
U.S. Representative before election
Richard Neal
Democratic
Elected U.S. Representative
Richard Neal
Democratic

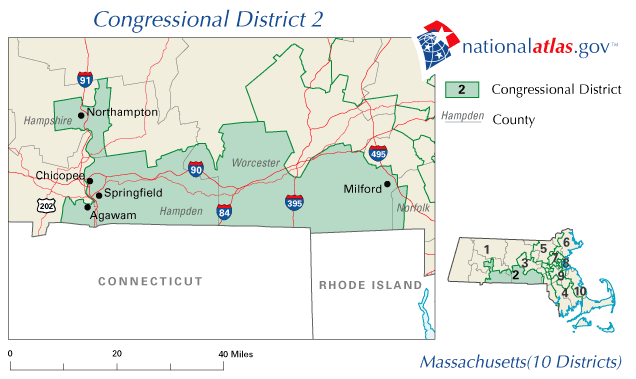

Incumbent Democratic Congressman Richard Neal has represented this liberal, south-central Massachusetts-based district since his initial election in 1988. Seeking a tenth term, Congressman Neal faced no opposition other than write-in candidates and easily won re-election.

=== Predictions ===
Source	Ranking	As of
The Cook Political Report	Safe D	November 6, 2006
Rothenberg	Safe D	November 6, 2006
Sabato's Crystal Ball	Safe D	November 6, 2006
Real Clear Politics	Safe D	November 7, 2006
CQ Politics	Safe D	November 7, 2006

Massachusetts's 2nd congressional district election, 2006
Party	Candidate	Votes	%
Democratic	Richard Neal (incumbent)	164,939	98.65
Write-ins		2,254	1.35
Total votes		167,193	100.00
Democratic hold			

== District 3 ==
2006 Massachusetts's 3rd congressional district election
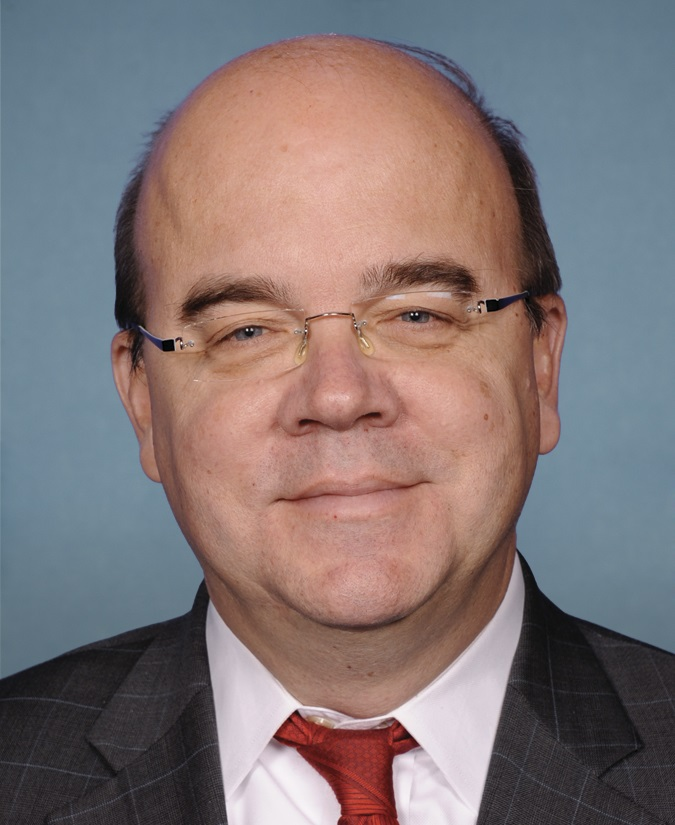
Nominee	Jim McGovern
Party	Democratic
Popular vote	166,973
Percentage	98.8%
U.S. Representative before election
Jim McGovern
Democratic
Elected U.S. Representative
Jim McGovern
Democratic

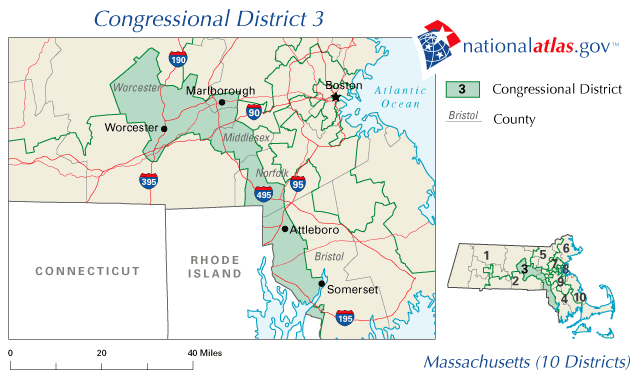

Congressman Jim McGovern, who built a reputation as an advocate for international human rights and as one of the most liberal members of Congress, has represented this solidly Democratic district since 1997. Facing no opposition in his bid for a sixth term, McGovern easily returned to Congress.

=== Predictions ===
Source	Ranking	As of
The Cook Political Report	Safe D	November 6, 2006
Rothenberg	Safe D	November 6, 2006
Sabato's Crystal Ball	Safe D	November 6, 2006
Real Clear Politics	Safe D	November 7, 2006
CQ Politics	Safe D	November 7, 2006

Massachusetts's 3rd congressional district election, 2006
Party	Candidate	Votes	%
Democratic	Jim McGovern (incumbent)	166,973	98.83
Write-ins		1,983	1.17
Total votes		168,956	100.00
Democratic hold			

== District 4 ==
2006 Massachusetts's 4th congressional district election
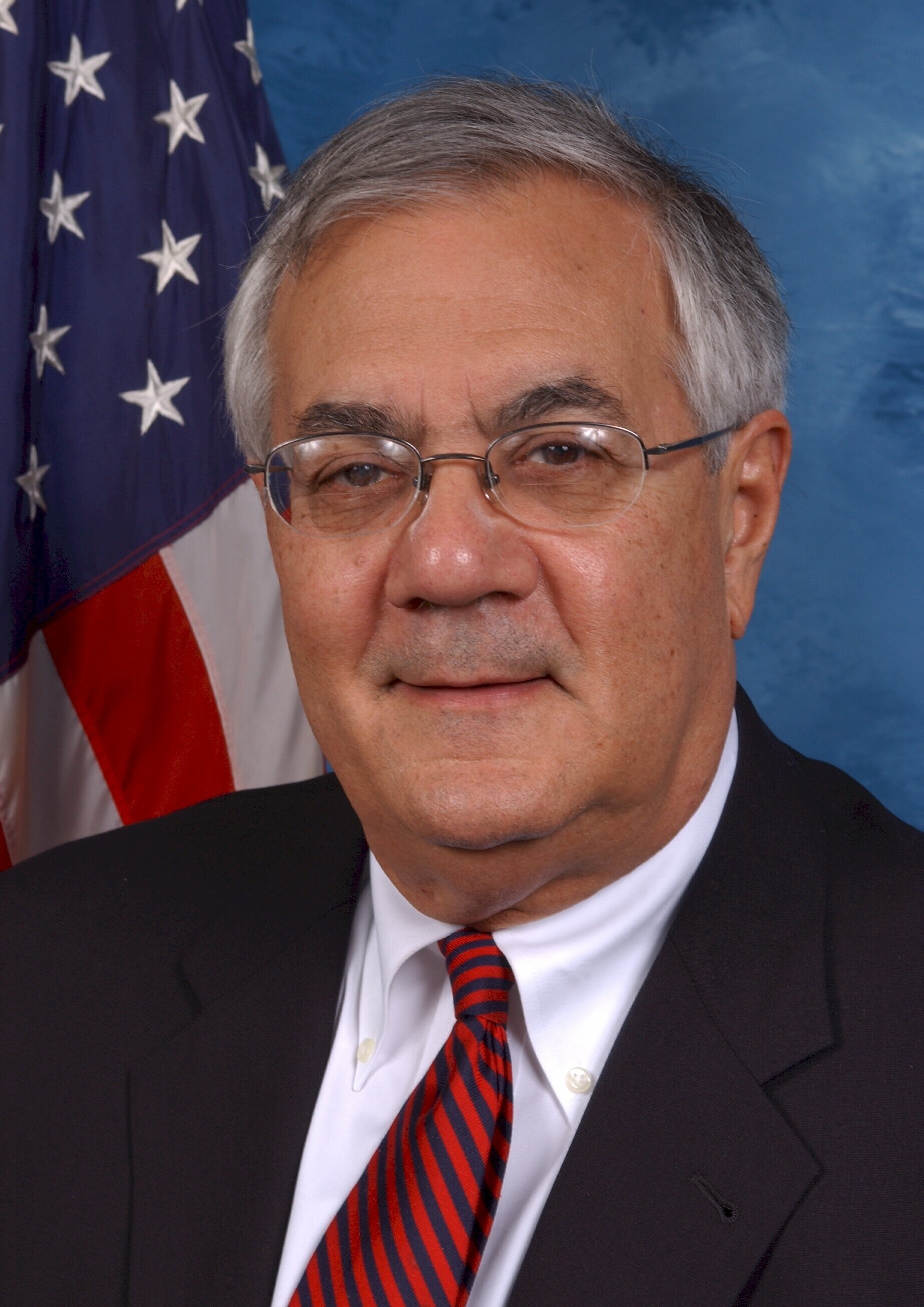
Nominee	Barney Frank
Party	Democratic
Popular vote	176,513
Percentage	98.5%
U.S. Representative before election
Barney Frank
Democratic
Elected U.S. Representative
Barney Frank
Democratic

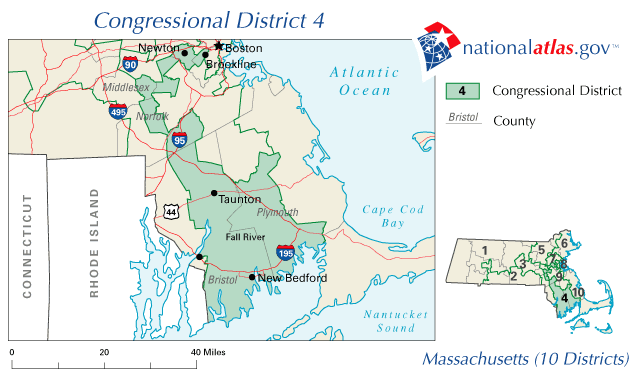

Long-serving incumbent Democratic Congressman Barney Frank, first elected in 1980, was one of the first openly gay prominent politicians in American history. Congressman Frank represents a solidly liberal district that extends from the southern suburbs of Boston to the South Coast.

=== Predictions ===
Source	Ranking	As of
The Cook Political Report	Safe D	November 6, 2006
Rothenberg	Safe D	November 6, 2006
Sabato's Crystal Ball	Safe D	November 6, 2006
Real Clear Politics	Safe D	November 7, 2006
CQ Politics	Safe D	November 7, 2006

Massachusetts's 4th congressional district election, 2006
Party	Candidate	Votes	%
Democratic	Barney Frank (incumbent)	176,513	98.48
Write-ins		2,730	1.52
Total votes		179,243	100.00
Democratic hold			

== District 5 ==
2006 Massachusetts's 5th congressional district election
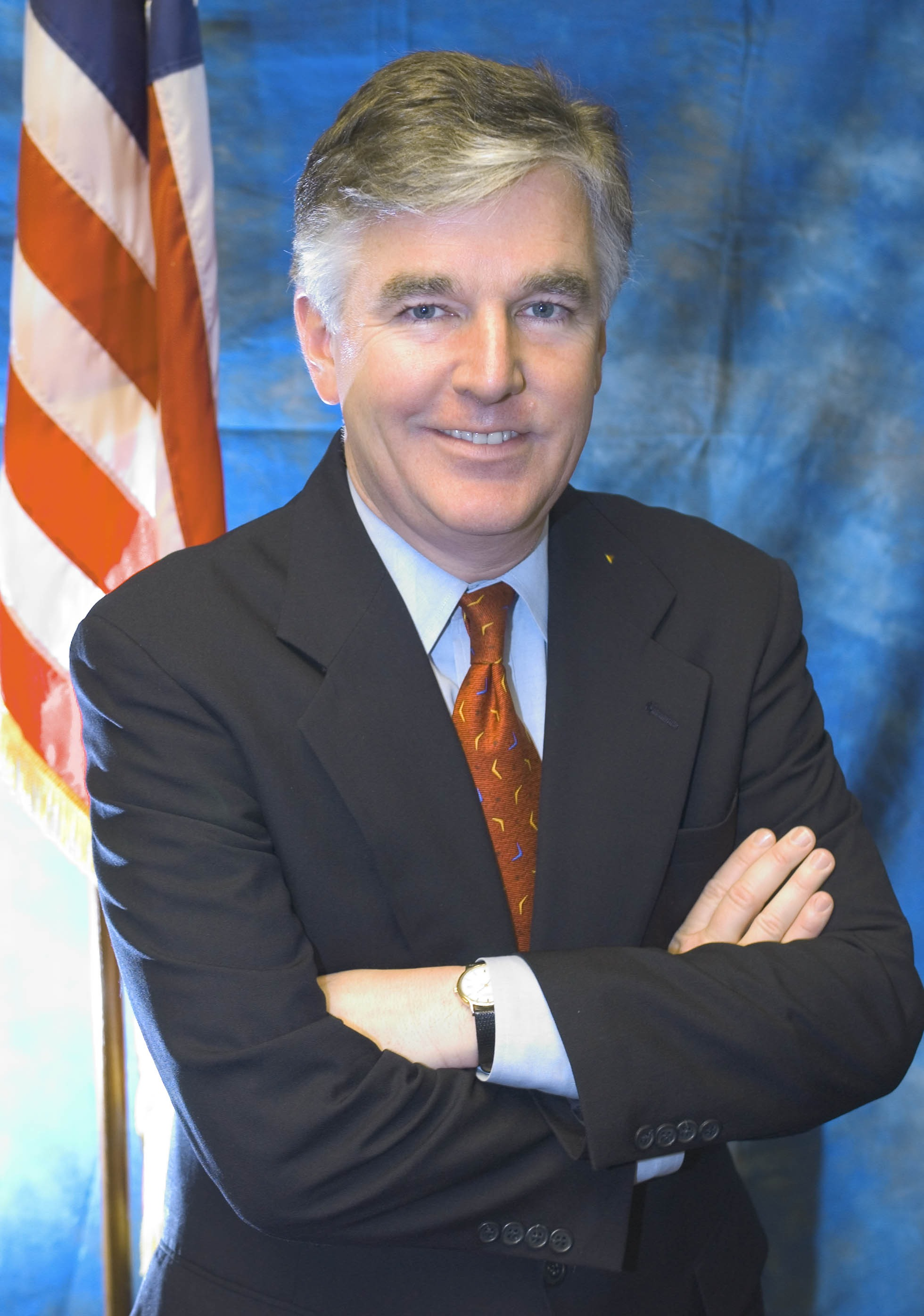
Nominee	Marty Meehan
Party	Democratic
Popular vote	159,120
Percentage	98.1%
U.S. Representative before election
Marty Meehan
Democratic
Elected U.S. Representative
Marty Meehan
Democratic

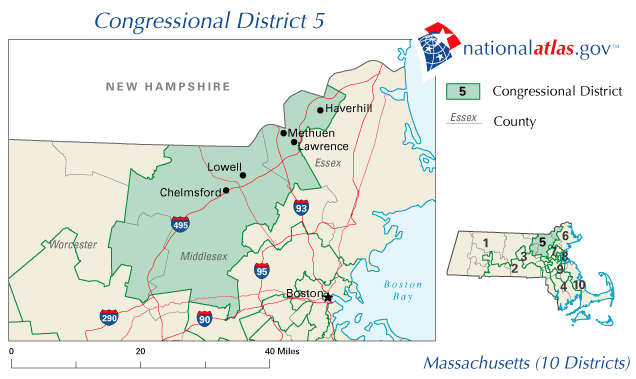

Incumbent Democratic Congressman Marty Meehan has represented this district that includes the northeastern suburbs of Boston since 1993, and he faced no opposition in his bid for an eighth term. Though Meehan was overwhelmingly re-elected, he did not fully serve out his term and resigned in July 2007 to become the Chancellor of the University of Massachusetts Lowell.

=== Predictions ===
Source	Ranking	As of
The Cook Political Report	Safe D	November 6, 2006
Rothenberg	Safe D	November 6, 2006
Sabato's Crystal Ball	Safe D	November 6, 2006
Real Clear Politics	Safe D	November 7, 2006
CQ Politics	Safe D	November 7, 2006

Massachusetts's 5th congressional district election, 2006
Party	Candidate	Votes	%
Democratic	Marty Meehan (incumbent)	159,120	98.06
Write-ins		3,152	1.94
Total votes		162,272	100.00
Democratic hold			

== District 6 ==
2006 Massachusetts's 6th congressional district election
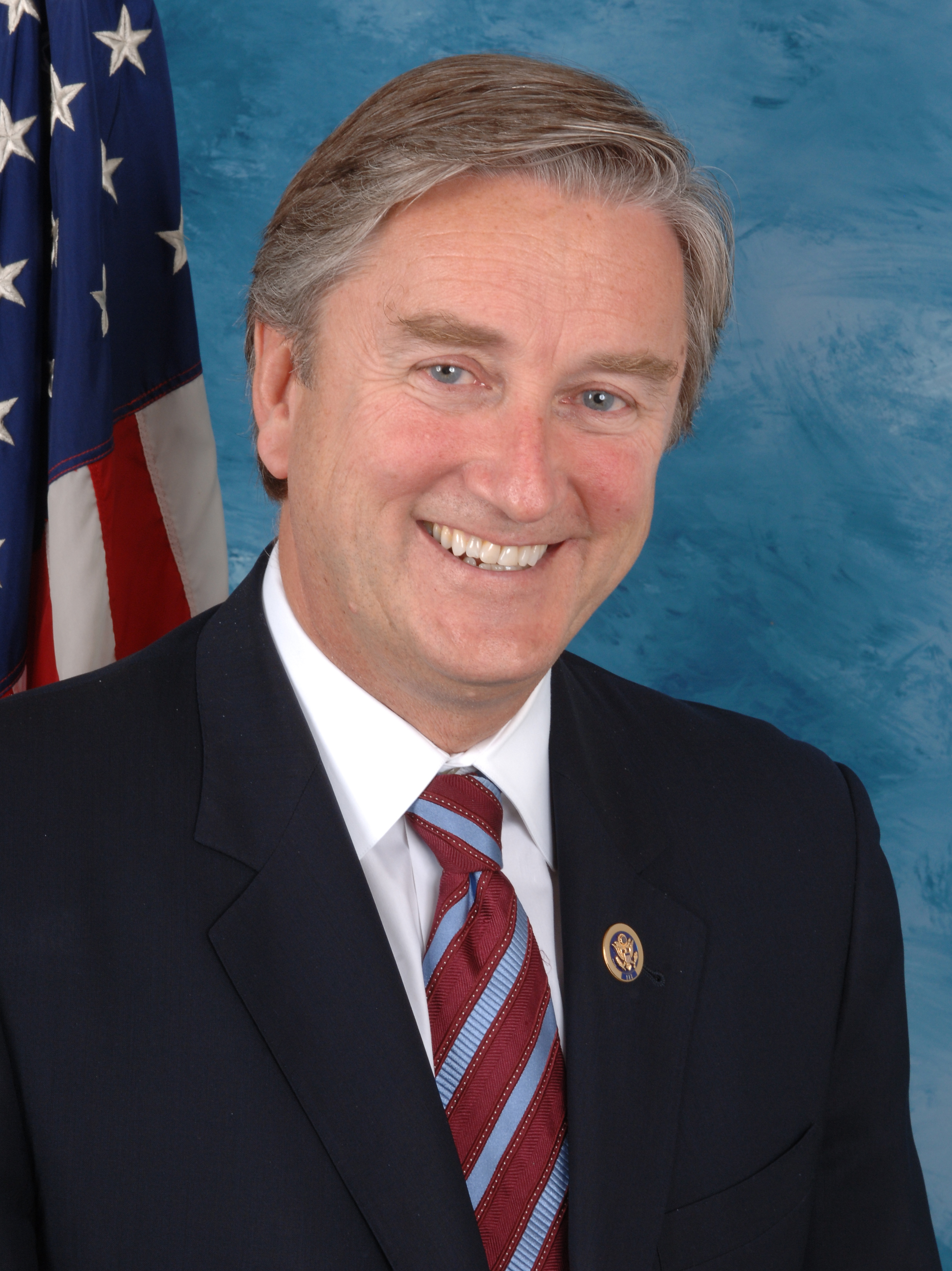

Nominee	John Tierney	Richard W. Barton
Party	Democratic	Republican
Popular vote	168,056	72,997
Percentage	69.5%	30.2%
- Municipality results Tierney: 50–60% 60–70% 70–80% 80–90%
U.S. Representative before election
John Tierney
Democratic
Elected U.S. Representative
John Tierney
Democratic

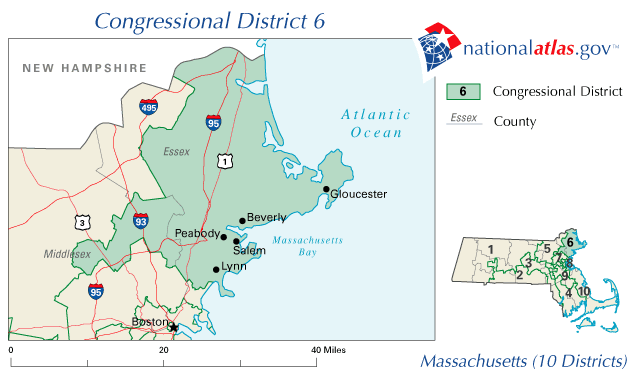

Incumbent Democratic Congressman John Tierney, who was first elected in 1996 by defeating Republican Congressman Peter Torkildsen, sought a sixth term in Congress. Congressman Tierney faced Republican candidate Rick Barton in the general election, whom he was able to easily defeat.

=== Predictions ===
Source	Ranking	As of
The Cook Political Report	Safe D	November 6, 2006
Rothenberg	Safe D	November 6, 2006
Sabato's Crystal Ball	Safe D	November 6, 2006
Real Clear Politics	Safe D	November 7, 2006
CQ Politics	Safe D	November 7, 2006

Massachusetts's 6th congressional district election, 2006
Party	Candidate	Votes	%
Democratic	John Tierney (incumbent)	168,056	69.55
Republican	Richard W. Barton	72,997	30.21
Write-ins		572	0.24
Total votes		241,625	100.00
Democratic hold			

== District 7 ==
2006 Massachusetts's 7th congressional district election
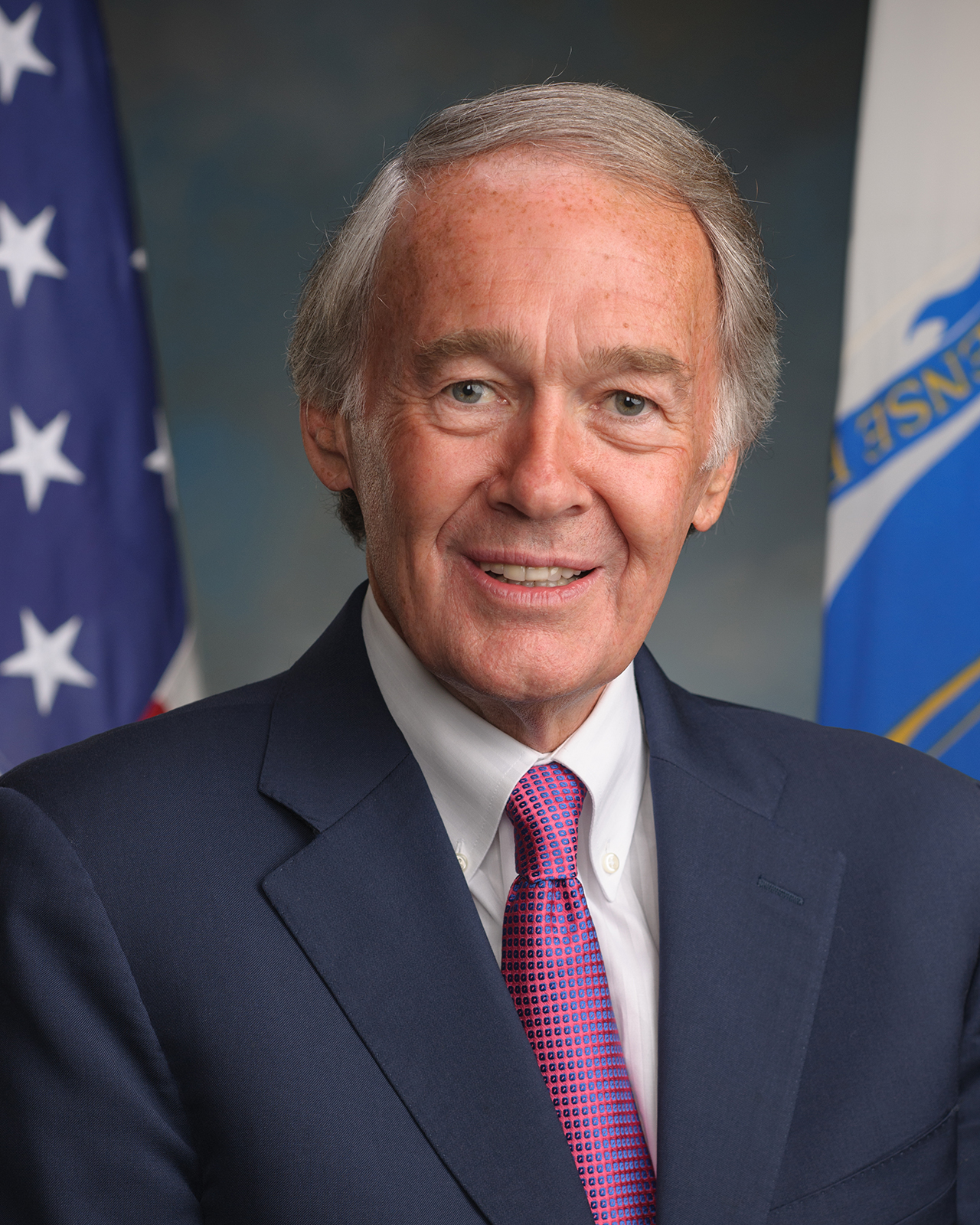
Nominee	Ed Markey
Party	Democratic
Popular vote	171,902
Percentage	98.3%
U.S. Representative before election
Ed Markey
Democratic
Elected U.S. Representative
Ed Markey
Democratic

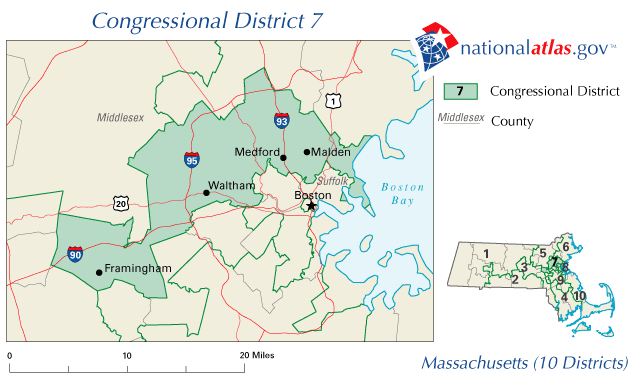

This heavily liberal district, based in the northern and eastern suburbs of Boston, has been represented by incumbent Democratic Congressman Ed Markey since he was first elected in a 1976 special election. Congressman Markey sought a seventeenth term and faced no opponent in the general election, allowing him to return to Congress with ease.

=== Predictions ===
Source	Ranking	As of
The Cook Political Report	Safe D	November 6, 2006
Rothenberg	Safe D	November 6, 2006
Sabato's Crystal Ball	Safe D	November 6, 2006
Real Clear Politics	Safe D	November 7, 2006
CQ Politics	Safe D	November 7, 2006

Massachusetts's 7th congressional district election, 2006
Party	Candidate	Votes	%
Democratic	Ed Markey (incumbent)	171,902	98.35
Write-ins		2,889	1.65
Total votes		174,791	100.00
Democratic hold			

== District 8 ==
2006 Massachusetts's 8th congressional district election
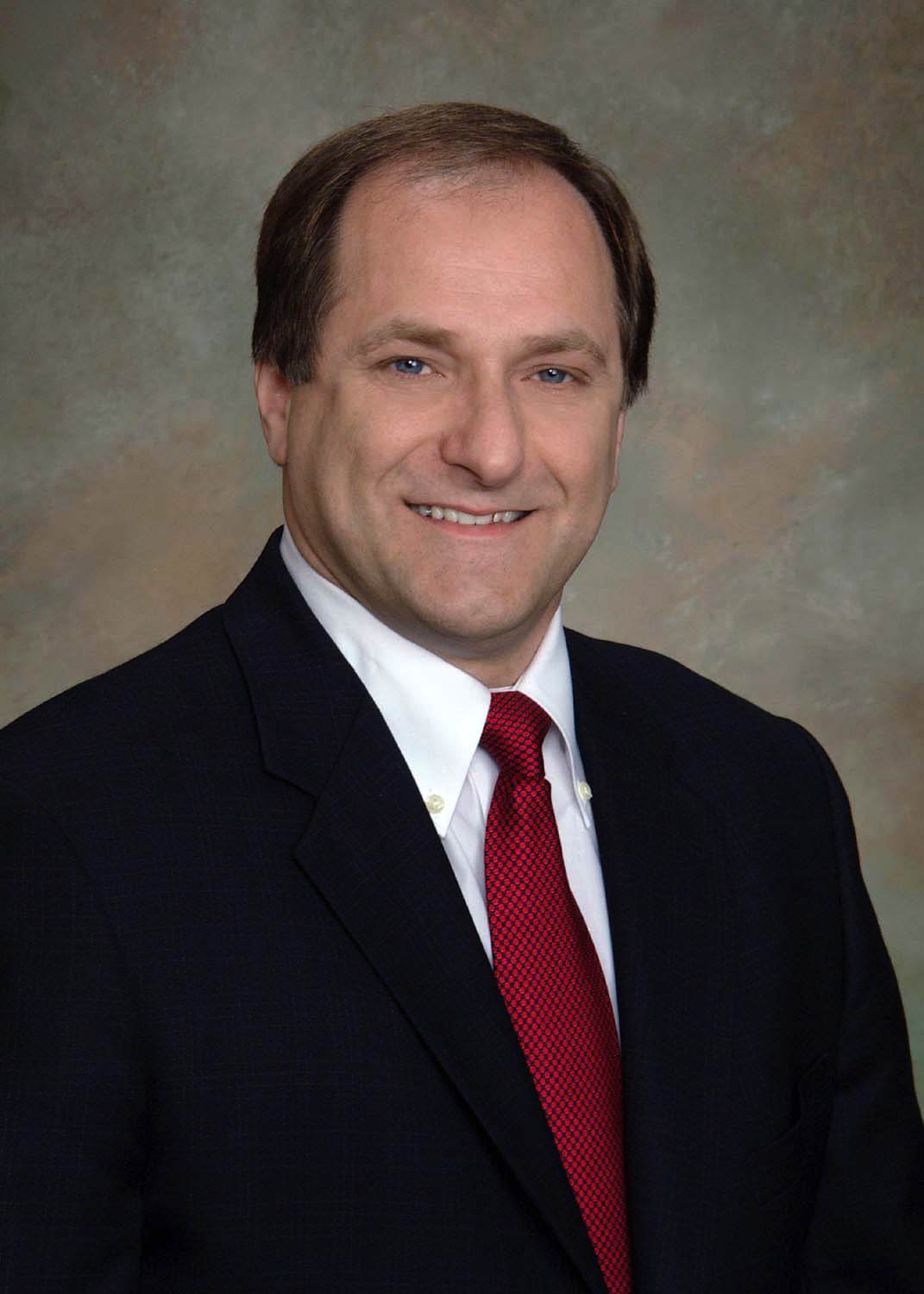

Nominee	Mike Capuano	Laura Garza
Party	Democratic	Socialist Workers
Popular vote	125,515	12,449
Percentage	90.7%	9.0%
- County results Capuano: 90–100%
U.S. Representative before election
Mike Capuano
Democratic
Elected U.S. Representative
Mike Capuano
Democratic

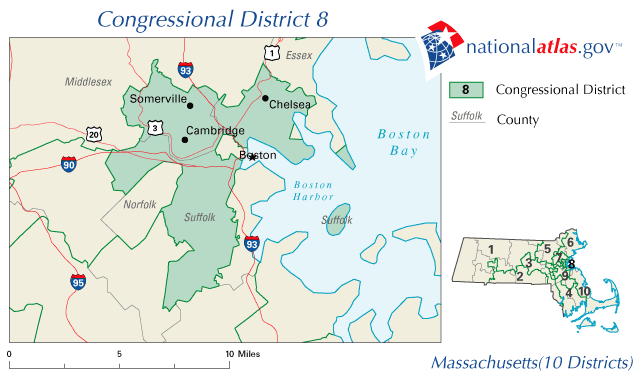

This strongly liberal district based in the city of Boston and some of its suburbs, has been represented by Democratic Congressman Mike Capuano since he was first elected in 1998. Congressman Capuano faced no Republican opponent in his bid for a fifth term, but was easily re-elected over Socialist Workers Party candidate Laura Garza and garment worker.

=== Predictions ===
Source	Ranking	As of
The Cook Political Report	Safe D	November 6, 2006
Rothenberg	Safe D	November 6, 2006
Sabato's Crystal Ball	Safe D	November 6, 2006
Real Clear Politics	Safe D	November 7, 2006
CQ Politics	Safe D	November 7, 2006

Massachusetts's 8th congressional district election, 2006
Party	Candidate	Votes	%
Democratic	Mike Capuano (incumbent)	125,515	90.65
Socialist Workers	Laura Garza	12,449	8.99
Write-ins		491	0.35
Total votes		138,455	100.00
Democratic hold			

== District 9 ==
2006 Massachusetts's 9th congressional district election
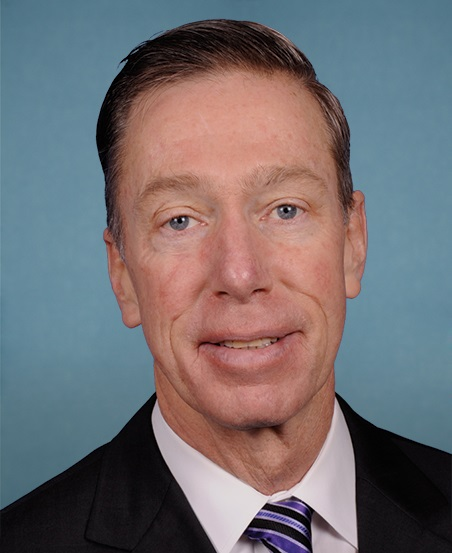

Nominee	Stephen Lynch	Jack Robinson
Party	Democratic	Republican
Popular vote	169,420	47,114
Percentage	78.1%	21.7%
- County results Lynch: 60–70% 70–80% 80–90%
U.S. Representative before election
Stephen Lynch
Democratic
Elected U.S. Representative
Stephen Lynch
Democratic

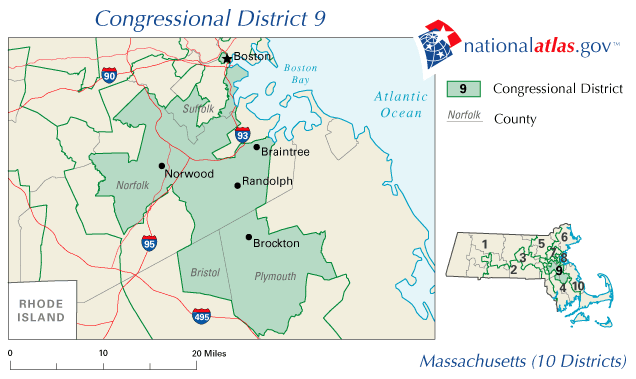

Congressman Stephen Lynch has represented this staunchly liberal, south Boston district since a 2001 special election. Lynch has established a reputation as being a moderate-liberal in Congress, holding anti-abortion views that separate him from the mainstream of the Democratic Party. Congressman Lynch faced Republican candidate Jack Robinson in the general election and coasted towards a fourth term in Congress.

=== Predictions ===
Source	Ranking	As of
The Cook Political Report	Safe D	November 6, 2006
Rothenberg	Safe D	November 6, 2006
Sabato's Crystal Ball	Safe D	November 6, 2006
Real Clear Politics	Safe D	November 7, 2006
CQ Politics	Safe D	November 7, 2006

Massachusetts's 9th congressional district election, 2006
Party	Candidate	Votes	%
Democratic	Stephen Lynch (incumbent)	169,420	78.06
Republican	Jack Robinson	47,114	21.71
Write-ins		502	0.23
Total votes		217,036	100.00
Democratic hold			

== District 10 ==
2006 Massachusetts's 10th congressional district election
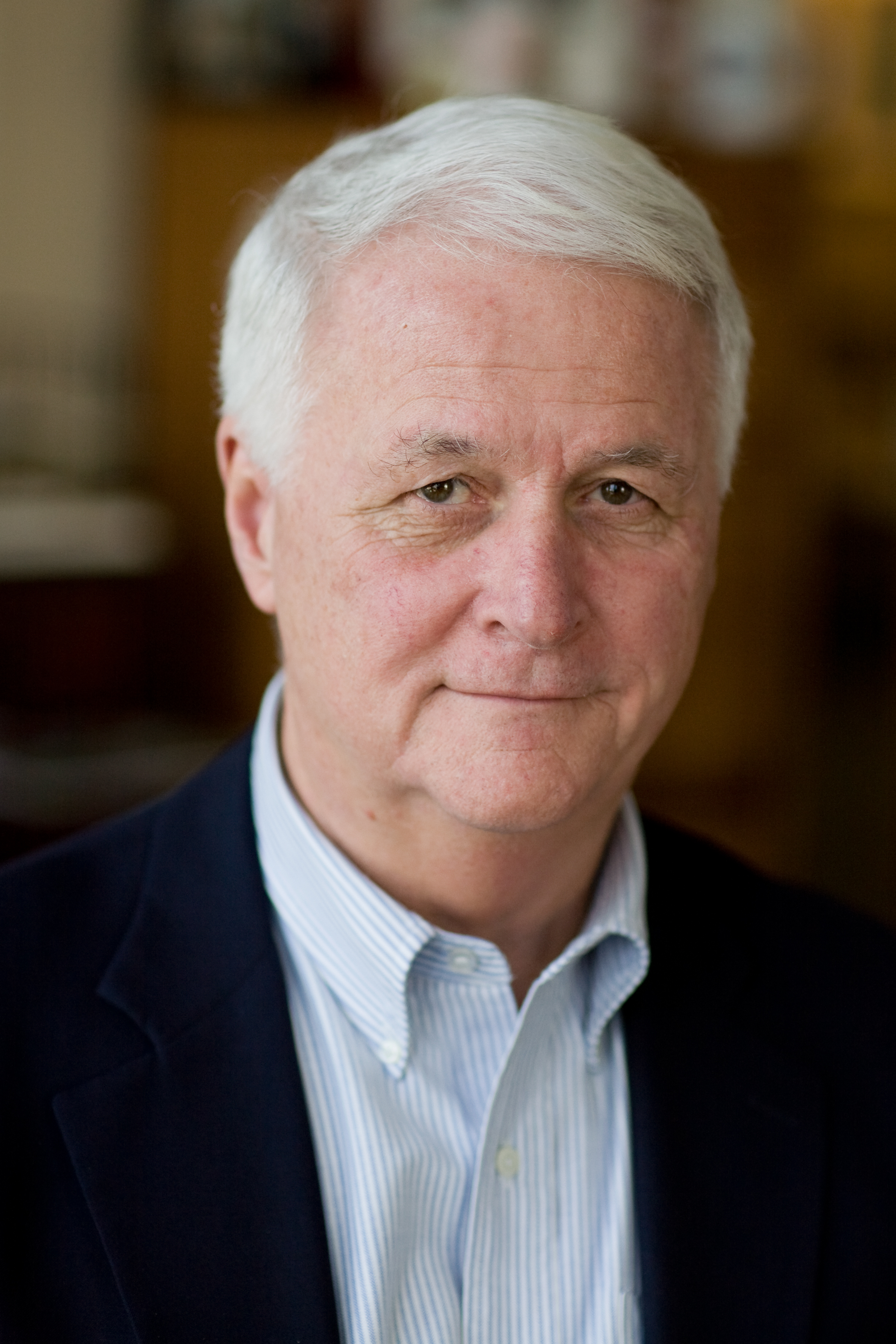

Nominee	Bill Delahunt	Jeff Beatty	Peter A. White
Party	Democratic	Republican	Independent
Popular vote	171,812	78,439	16,808
Percentage	64.3%	29.4%	6.3%
- Municipality results Delahunt: 50–60% 60–70% 70–80% 80–90%
U.S. Representative before election
Bill Delahunt
Democratic
Elected U.S. Representative
Bill Delahunt
Democratic

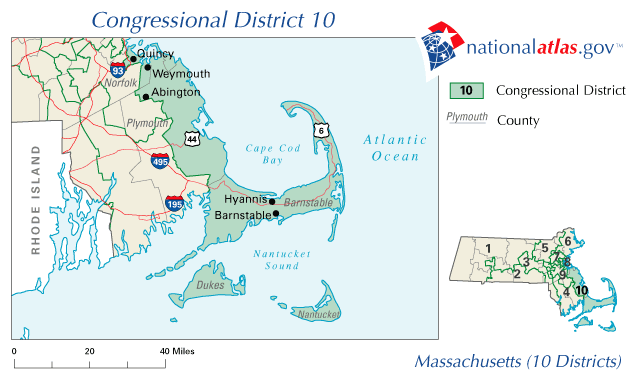

This district, the most moderate in the commonwealth, but still decidedly liberal, consists of the South Shore, Cape Cod, and the Islands, along with some southern parts of Metropolitan Boston. This district has been represented by Democratic Congressman Bill Delahunt for the past ten years. Delahunt, seeking a sixth term in Congress, ran against Republican businessman Jeff Beatty and independent candidate Peter White, whom he was able to crush in the general election.

=== Predictions ===
Source	Ranking	As of
The Cook Political Report	Safe D	November 6, 2006
Rothenberg	Safe D	November 6, 2006
Sabato's Crystal Ball	Safe D	November 6, 2006
Real Clear Politics	Safe D	November 7, 2006
CQ Politics	Safe D	November 7, 2006

Massachusetts's 10th congressional district election, 2006
Party	Candidate	Votes	%
Democratic	Bill Delahunt (incumbent)	171,812	64.30
Republican	Jeff Beatty	78,439	29.36
Independent	Peter A. White	16,808	6.29
Write-ins		143	0.05
Total votes		267,202	100.00
Democratic hold			

== See also ==
- United States House elections, 2006
- United States House election, 2006 complete list

Preceded by 2004 elections	United States House elections in Massachusetts; 2006	Succeeded by 2008 elections
