= Nadia Milleron =

American aviation safety advocate

- Born: Nadia Donya Milleron; 1964 (age 61–62); California, U.S.
- Education: Smith College (BA); University of Iowa (JD)
- Political party: Independent
- Spouse: Michael Stumo (m. 1992)
- Relatives: Laura Nader (mother); Ralph Nader (uncle)

Nadia Donya Milleron (born 1964) is an American aviation safety and consumer advocate. She is also the niece of four time U.S. presidential candidate Ralph Nader.

== Early life and education ==
Nadia Milleron was born in California in 1964 to American anthropologist Laura Nader. She is the granddaughter of Lebanese-American activist Rose Nader.

Milleron moved to Massachusetts in 1982 to attend Smith College for her undergraduate degree and then studied at the University of Iowa School of Law where she graduated with a Juris Doctor degree. Milleron co-authored the book, "Canada Firsts" along with her uncle Ralph Nader in 1992.

That same year Nadia married attorney Michael Stumo, who is the CEO of the Coalition For A Prosperous America. The pair had 4 children. In 1999 the couple moved to Sheffield, Massachusetts.

== Consumer advocacy ==
On March 10, 2019, Milleron's 24-year-old daughter Samya Rose Stumo was killed in the Ethiopian Airlines Flight 302 crash. Samya Stumo was a humanitarian and global health professional. She was one of 157 fatalities in the crash that left no survivors. The day of the crash, Milleron and her family traveled to Addis Ababa, not knowing if there were survivors. During this trip they met many families who had lost loved ones in the crash.

After the accident, Milleron, along with her uncle Ralph Nader, called for a boycott of the Boeing 737 Max and for whistleblowers at Boeing to come forward regarding safety issues. They also called on the F.A.A. not to let the 737 Max jets back in the air until more research was conducted regarding the crashes the planes were involved in. Milleron and her husband filed a civil lawsuit against Boeing for the wrongful death of their daughter. On May 13, 2026, the jury awarded the family $49.5 M in damages.

Milleron was featured on a special episode of ABC's 20/20 titled Falling From the Sky. She and her husband continued to lead the consumer safety campaign against Boeing and became major public critics of the company. Milleron confronted Boeing CEO Dennis Muilenburg during his testimony in front of the United States Senate regarding the crash. She later met with the United States Department of Justice regarding Boeing's criminal conduct.

Milleron herself met numerous times with members of the United States House of Representatives, the Federal Aviation Administration, the National Transportation Safety Board and Illinois House of Representatives. Her advocacy and testimony led in part to the passage of the bi-partisan Aircraft Certification, Safety, and Accountability Act passed by Congress in 2020 and in 2021 Boeing was criminally charged with fraud related to the death of her daughter.

== Political career ==
On March 13, 2024, Milleron announced her candidacy for Congress, running as an independent against Rep. Richard Neal in Massachusetts's 1st congressional district. She gathered 3,000 signatures from voters in 80 towns in order to appear on the ballot. Milleron raised $70,000 in donations as of June 2024. On December 12, 2025, she filed to run in Massachusetts's 1st congressional district again. According to FEC reports she had raised 20,455 dollars and spent 14,847.
