= 2008 United States House of Representatives elections in Massachusetts =

- November 4, 2008

All 10 Massachusetts seats in the United States House of Representatives
	Majority party	Minority party
Party	Democratic	Republican
Last election	10	0
Seats won	10	0
Seat change	Steady	Steady
Popular vote	2,245,778	318,461
Percentage	86.21%	12.22%
Swing	▲1.36%	▲1.90%
- Democratic 60–70% 70–80% 90>%

The 2008 congressional elections in Massachusetts were held on November 4, 2008, to determine who will represent the U.S. state of Massachusetts in the United States House of Representatives. Representatives are elected for two-year terms; whoever is elected will serve in the 111th Congress from January 4, 2009, until January 3, 2011. The election coincides with the 2008 U.S. presidential election.

Massachusetts has ten seats in the House, apportioned according to the 2000 United States census. Its 2007-2008 congressional delegation consisted of ten Democrats. This remains unchanged, and CQ Politics had forecasted all districts safe for its Democratic incumbent.

== Overview ==
United States House of Representatives elections in Massachusetts, 2008
Party	Votes	Percentage	Seats	+/–
Democratic	2,245,778	86.21%	10	+1.36%
Republican	318,461	12.22%	0	+1.90%
Independents	40,875	1.57%	0	-3.25%
Totals	2,605,114	100.00%	10	—

== District 1 ==
2008 Massachusetts's 1st congressional district election
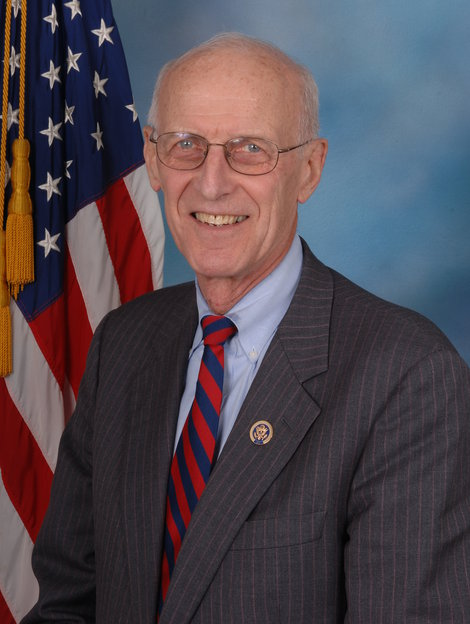

Nominee	John Olver	Nathan A. Bech
Party	Democratic	Republican
Popular vote	215,696	80,067
Percentage	72.8%	27.0%
- County results Olver: 50–60% 60–70% 70–80% 80–90%
U.S. Representative before election
John Olver (inc.)
Democratic
Elected U.S. Representative
John Olver
Democratic

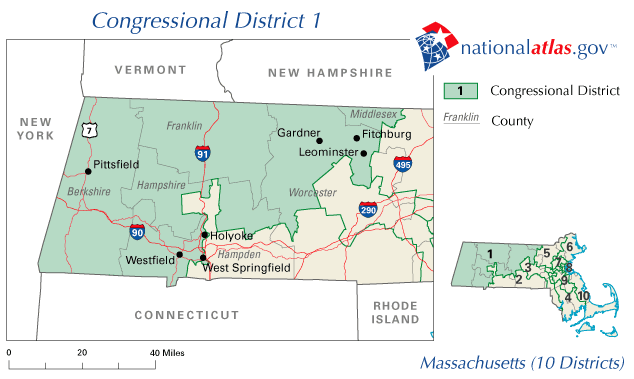

Massachusetts's 1st congressional district covers roughly the northwest half of the state. It has been represented by Democrat John Olver since June, 1991.

=== Predictions ===
Source	Ranking	As of
The Cook Political Report	Safe D	November 6, 2008
Rothenberg	Safe D	November 2, 2008
Sabato's Crystal Ball	Safe D	November 6, 2008
Real Clear Politics	Safe D	November 7, 2008
CQ Politics	Safe D	November 6, 2008

Massachusetts's 1st congressional district election, 2008
Party	Candidate	Votes	%
Democratic	John Olver (inc.)	215,696	72.85
Republican	Nathan A. Bech	80,067	27.04
Write-ins		336	0.11
Total votes		296,099	100.00
Democratic hold			

== District 2 ==
2008 Massachusetts's 2nd congressional district election
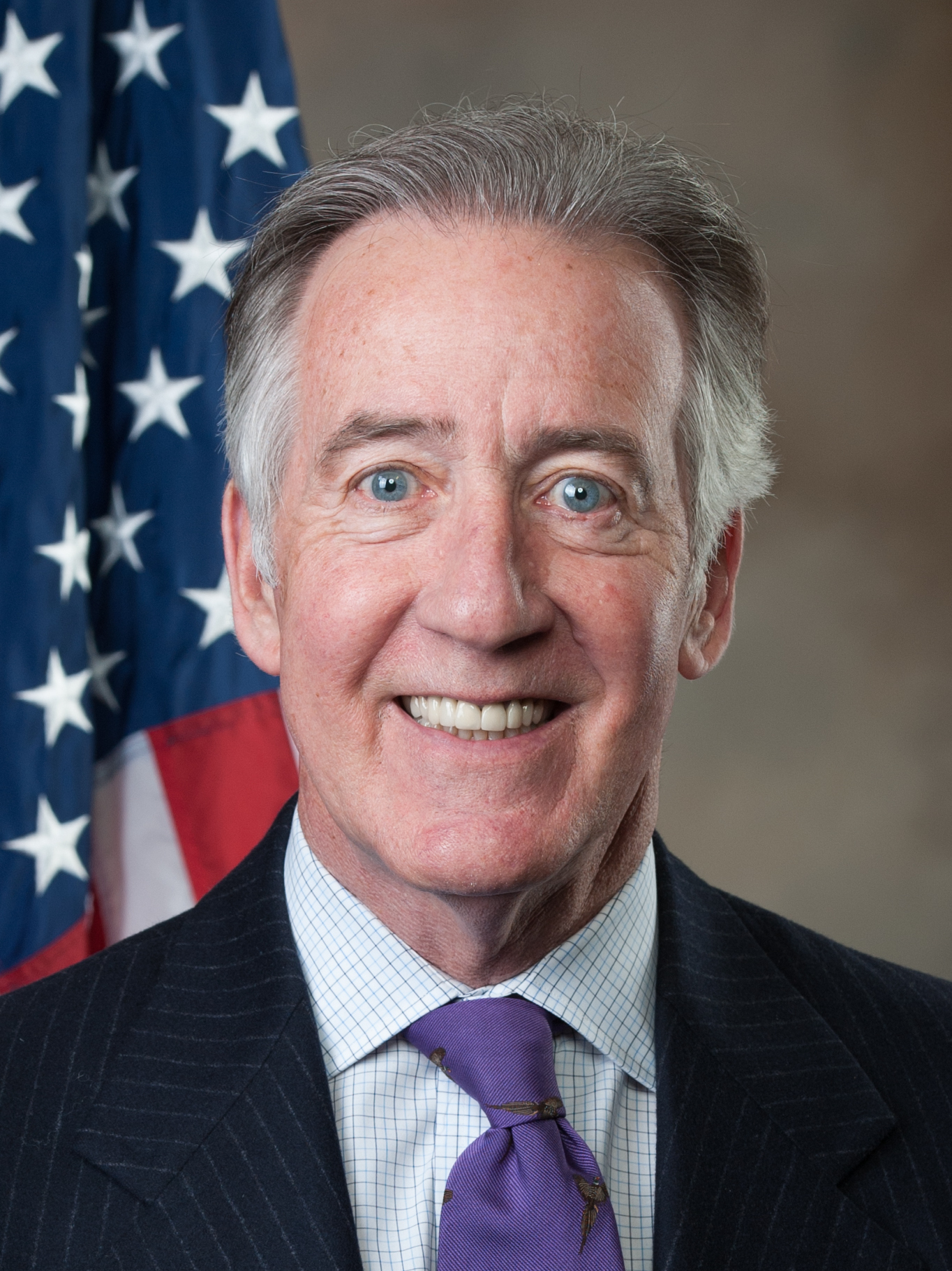
Nominee	Richard Neal
Party	Democratic
Popular vote	234,369
Percentage	98.5%
U.S. Representative before election
Richard Neal (inc.)
Democratic
Elected U.S. Representative
Richard Neal
Democratic

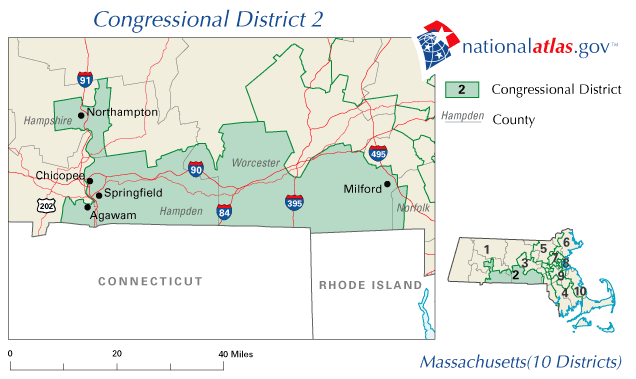

Massachusetts's 2nd congressional district lies in the south-central part of the state. It has been represented by Democrat Richard Neal since 1989.

=== Predictions ===
Source	Ranking	As of
The Cook Political Report	Safe D	November 6, 2008
Rothenberg	Safe D	November 2, 2008
Sabato's Crystal Ball	Safe D	November 6, 2008
Real Clear Politics	Safe D	November 7, 2008
CQ Politics	Safe D	November 6, 2008

Massachusetts's 2nd congressional district election, 2008
Party	Candidate	Votes	%
Democratic	Richard Neal (inc.)	234,369	98.47
Write-ins		3,631	1.53
Total votes		238,000	100.00
Democratic hold			

== District 3 ==
2008 Massachusetts's 3rd congressional district election
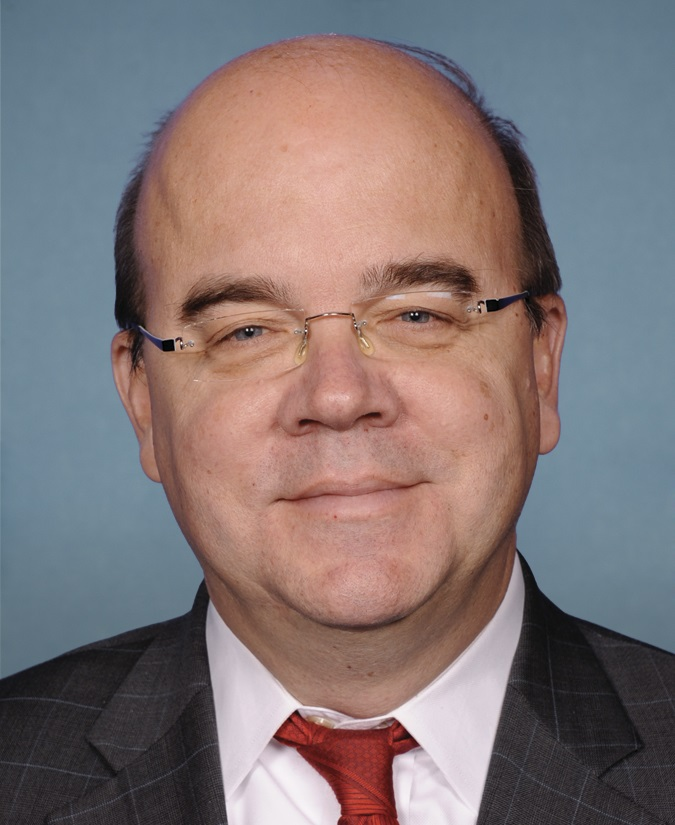
Nominee	Jim McGovern
Party	Democratic
Popular vote	227,619
Percentage	98.5%
U.S. Representative before election
Jim McGovern (inc.)
Democratic
Elected U.S. Representative
Jim McGovern
Democratic

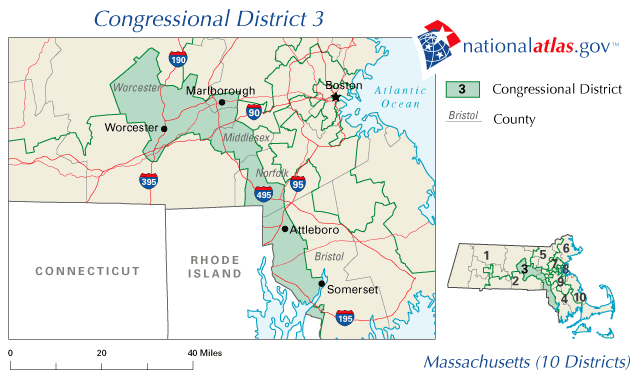

Massachusetts's 3rd congressional district lies in the central and southeastern part of the state. It has been represented by Democrat Jim McGovern since 1997.

=== Predictions ===
Source	Ranking	As of
The Cook Political Report	Safe D	November 6, 2008
Rothenberg	Safe D	November 2, 2008
Sabato's Crystal Ball	Safe D	November 6, 2008
Real Clear Politics	Safe D	November 7, 2008
CQ Politics	Safe D	November 6, 2008

Massachusetts's 3rd congressional district election, 2008
Party	Candidate	Votes	%
Democratic	Jim McGovern (inc.)	227,619	98.49
Write-ins		3,488	1.51
Total votes		231,107	100.00
Democratic hold			

== District 4 ==
2008 Massachusetts's 4th congressional district election
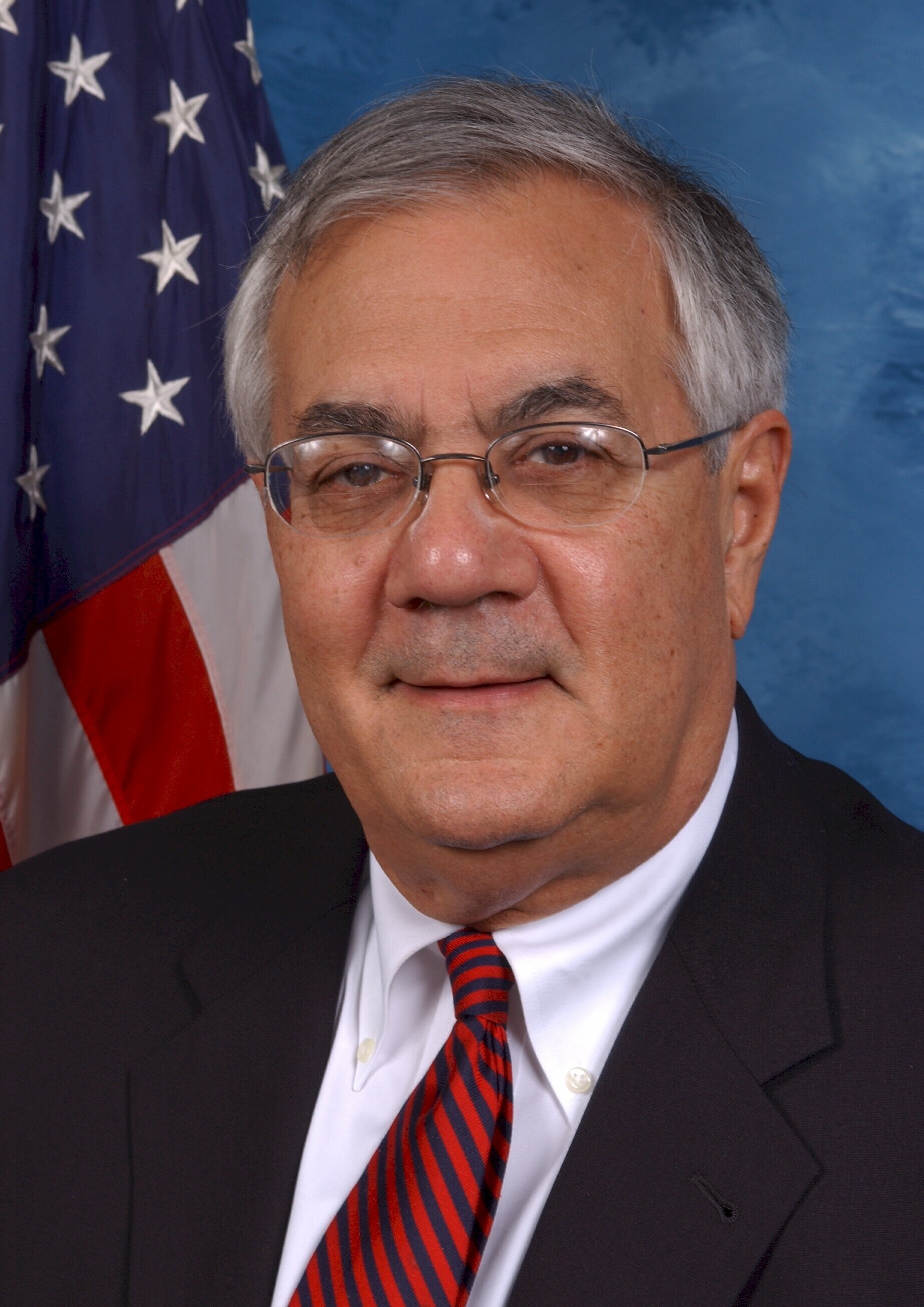

Nominee	Barney Frank	Earl Henry Sholley	Susan Allen
Party	Democratic	Republican	Independent
Popular vote	203,032	75,571	19,848
Percentage	68.0%	25.3%	6.6%
- County results Frank: 50–60% 60–70% 70–80%
U.S. Representative before election
Barney Frank (inc.)
Democratic
Elected U.S. Representative
Barney Frank
Democratic

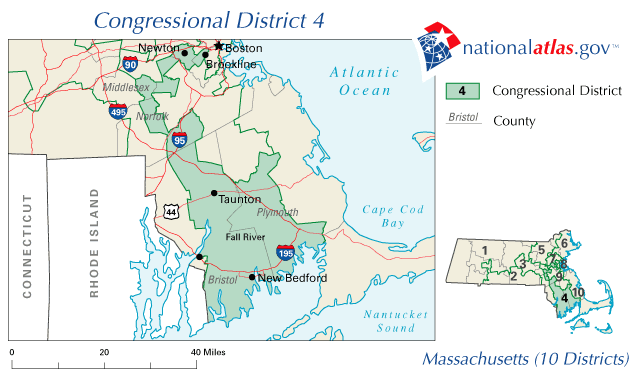

Massachusetts's 4th congressional district lies in the southern part of the state, including the South Coast region. It has been represented by Democrat Barney Frank since 1981.

=== Predictions ===
Source	Ranking	As of
The Cook Political Report	Safe D	November 6, 2008
Rothenberg	Safe D	November 2, 2008
Sabato's Crystal Ball	Safe D	November 6, 2008
Real Clear Politics	Safe D	November 7, 2008
CQ Politics	Safe D	November 6, 2008

Massachusetts's 4th congressional district election, 2008
Party	Candidate	Votes	%
Democratic	Barney Frank (inc.)	203,032	67.95
Republican	Earl Henry Sholley	75,571	25.29
Independent	Susan Allen	19,848	6.64
Write-ins		337	0.11
Total votes		298,788	100.00
Democratic hold			

== District 5 ==
2008 Massachusetts's 5th congressional district election
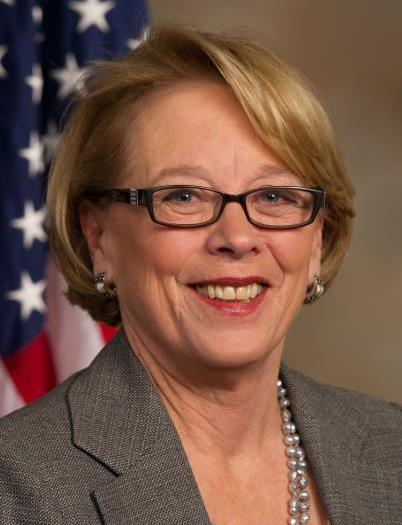
Nominee	Niki Tsongas
Party	Democratic
Popular vote	225,947
Percentage	98.7%
U.S. Representative before election
Niki Tsongas
Democratic
Elected U.S. Representative
Niki Tsongas
Democratic

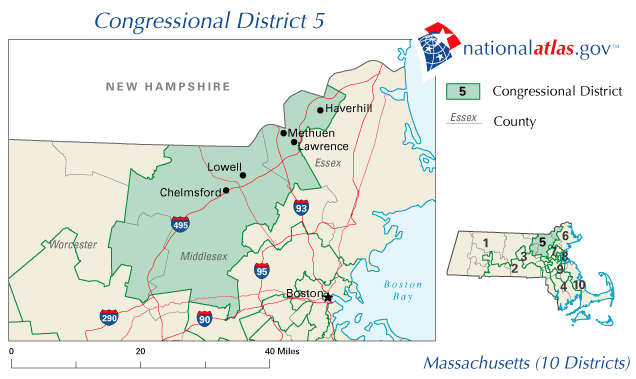

Massachusetts's 5th congressional district lies in the north-east part of the state. It has been represented by Democrat Niki Tsongas since October, 2007.

=== Predictions ===
Source	Ranking	As of
The Cook Political Report	Safe D	November 6, 2008
Rothenberg	Safe D	November 2, 2008
Sabato's Crystal Ball	Safe D	November 6, 2008
Real Clear Politics	Safe D	November 7, 2008
CQ Politics	Safe D	November 6, 2008

Massachusetts's 5th congressional district election, 2008
Party	Candidate	Votes	%
Democratic	Niki Tsongas (incumbent)	225,947	98.71
Write-ins		2,960	1.29
Total votes		228,907	100.00
Democratic hold			

== District 6 ==
2008 Massachusetts's 6th congressional district election
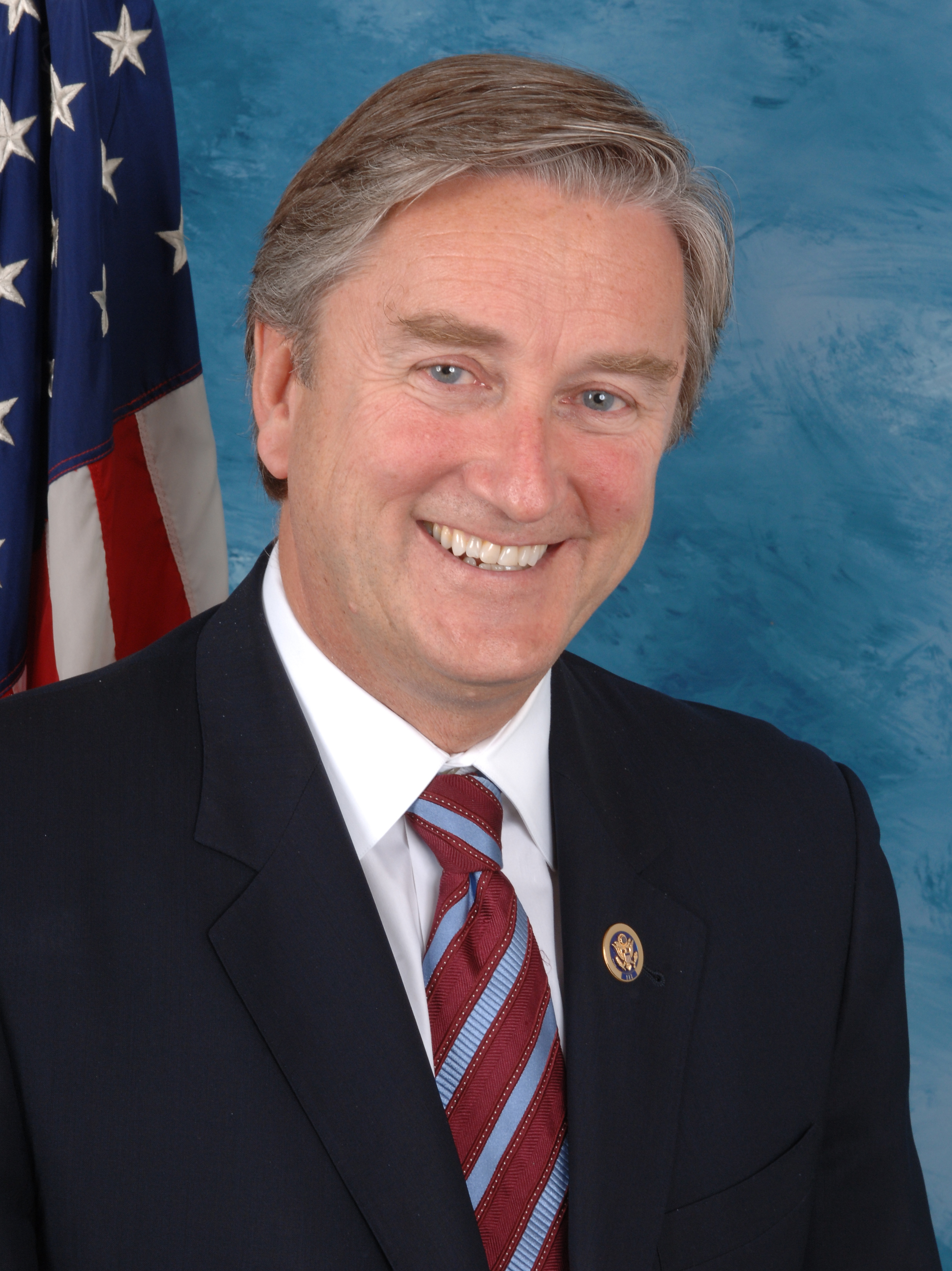

Nominee	John Tierney	Richard A. Baker
Party	Democratic	Republican
Popular vote	226,216	94,845
Percentage	70.4%	29.5%
- Municipality results Tierney: 50–60% 60–70% 70–80% 80–90%
U.S. Representative before election
John Tierney (inc.)
Democratic
Elected U.S. Representative
John Tierney
Democratic

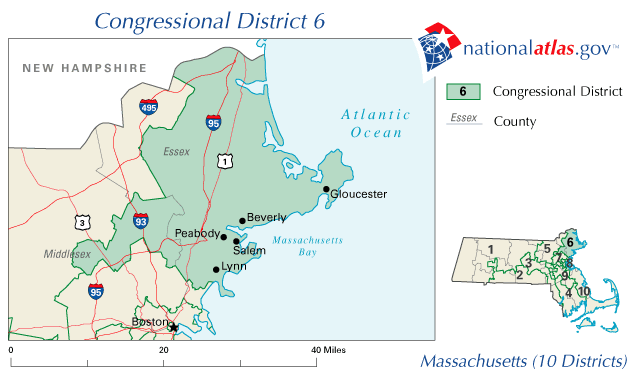

Massachusetts's 6th congressional district covers the north-east corner of the state. It has been represented by Democrat John Tierney since 1997.

=== Predictions ===
Source	Ranking	As of
The Cook Political Report	Safe D	November 6, 2008
Rothenberg	Safe D	November 2, 2008
Sabato's Crystal Ball	Safe D	November 6, 2008
Real Clear Politics	Safe D	November 7, 2008
CQ Politics	Safe D	November 6, 2008

Massachusetts's 6th congressional district election, 2008
Party	Candidate	Votes	%
Democratic	John Tierney (inc.)	226,216	70.40
Republican	Richard A. Baker	94,845	29.52
Write-ins		251	0.08
Total votes		321,312	100.00
Democratic hold			

== District 7 ==
2008 Massachusetts's 7th congressional district election
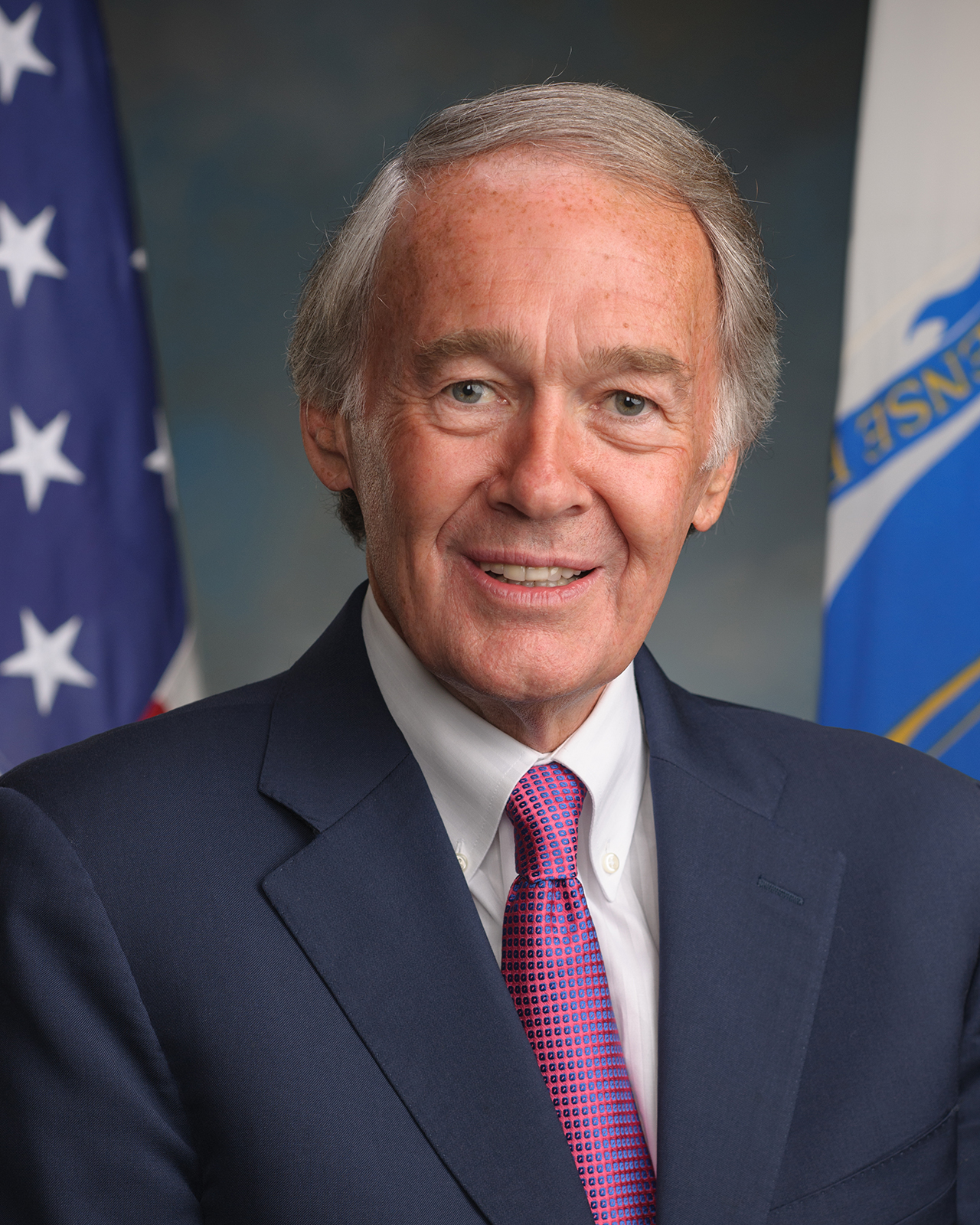

Nominee	Ed Markey	John Cunningham
Party	Democratic	Republican
Popular vote	212,304	67,978
Percentage	75.6%	24.2%
- County results Markey: 70–80%
U.S. Representative before election
Ed Markey (inc.)
Democratic
Elected U.S. Representative
Ed Markey
Democratic

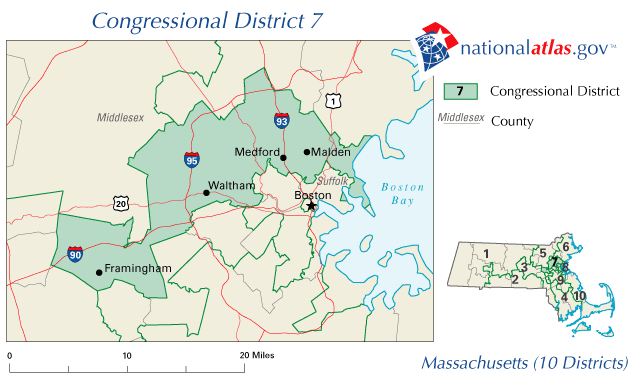

Massachusetts's 7th congressional district lies in the eastern part of the state, including some Boston suburbs. It has been represented by Democrat Edward J. Markey since 1976.

=== Predictions ===
Source	Ranking	As of
The Cook Political Report	Safe D	November 6, 2008
Rothenberg	Safe D	November 2, 2008
Sabato's Crystal Ball	Safe D	November 6, 2008
Real Clear Politics	Safe D	November 7, 2008
CQ Politics	Safe D	November 6, 2008

Massachusetts's 7th congressional district election, 2008
Party	Candidate	Votes	%
Democratic	Ed Markey (inc.)	212,304	75.64
Republican	John Cunningham	67,978	24.22
Write-ins		400	0.14
Total votes		280,682	100.00
Democratic hold			

== District 8 ==
2008 Massachusetts's 8th congressional district election
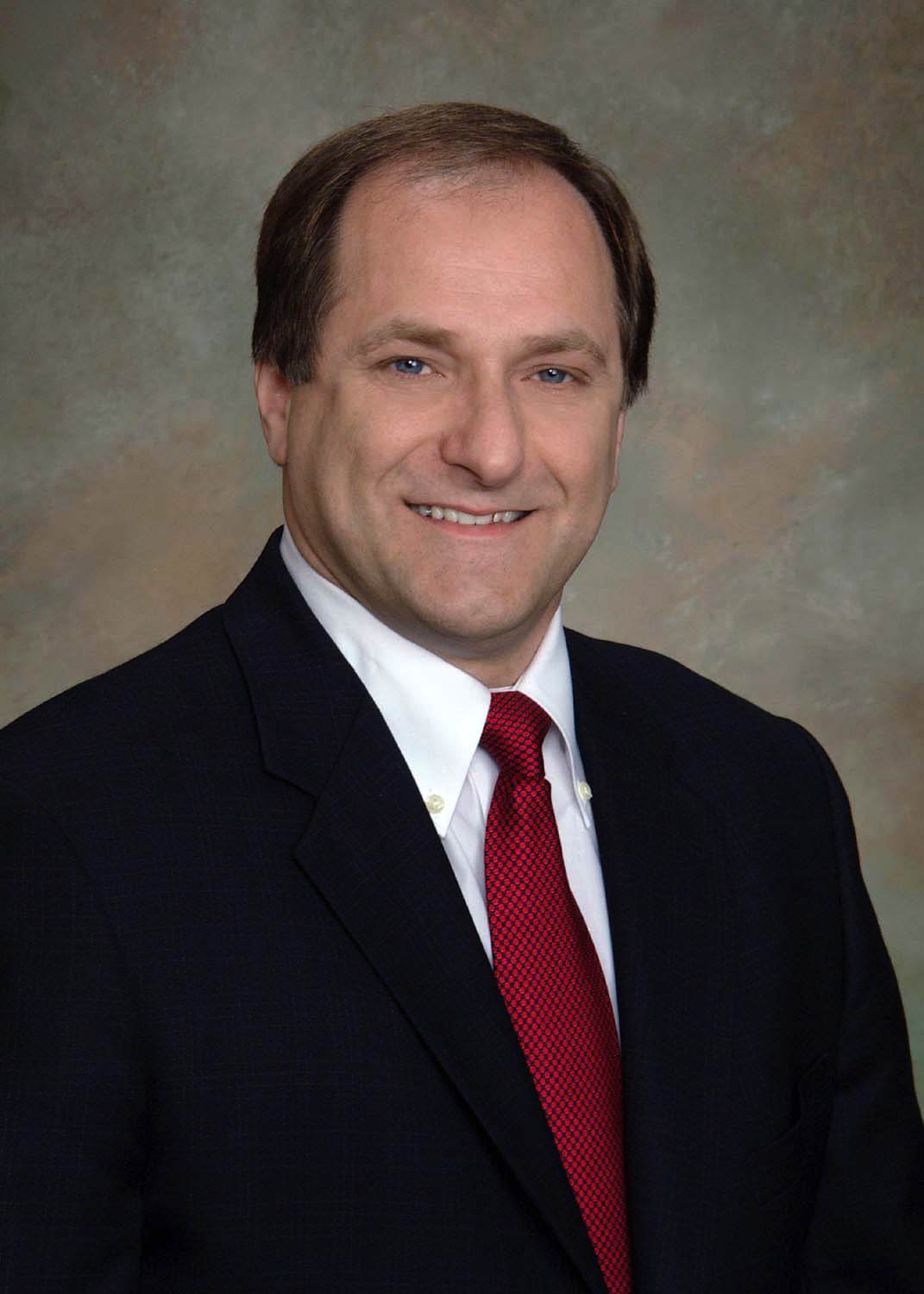
Nominee	Mike Capuano
Party	Democratic
Popular vote	185,530
Percentage	98.5%
U.S. Representative before election
Mike Capuano (inc.)
Democratic
Elected U.S. Representative
Mike Capuano
Democratic

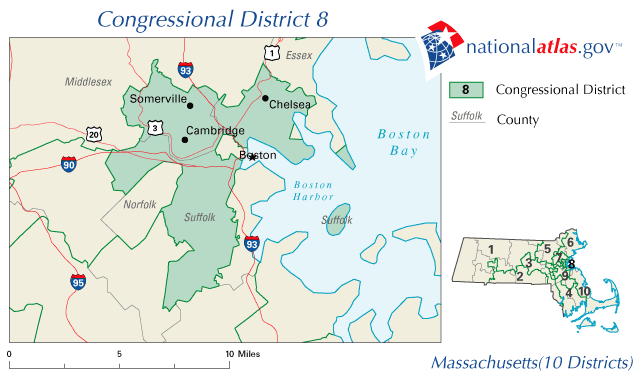

Massachusetts's 8th congressional district lies in the eastern part of the state, including part of Boston and the immediately adjacent cities of Cambridge, Somerville, and Chelsea. It has been represented by Democrat Mike Capuano since 1999.

=== Predictions ===
Source	Ranking	As of
The Cook Political Report	Safe D	November 6, 2008
Rothenberg	Safe D	November 2, 2008
Sabato's Crystal Ball	Safe D	November 6, 2008
Real Clear Politics	Safe D	November 7, 2008
CQ Politics	Safe D	November 6, 2008

Massachusetts's 8th congressional district election, 2008
Party	Candidate	Votes	%
Democratic	Mike Capuano (inc.)	185,530	98.55
Write-ins		2,722	1.45
Total votes		188,252	100.00
Democratic hold			

== District 9 ==
2008 Massachusetts's 9th congressional district election
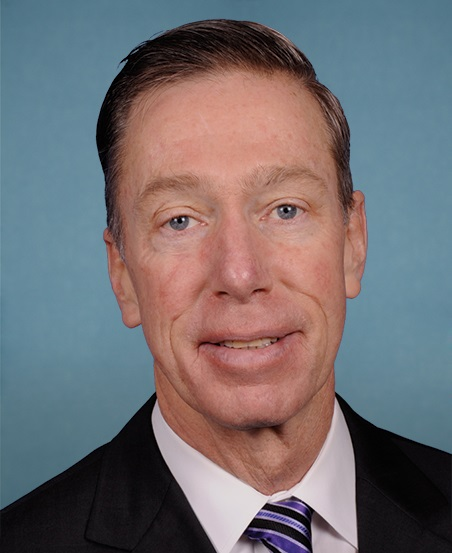
Nominee	Stephen Lynch
Party	Democratic
Popular vote	242,166
Percentage	98.7%
U.S. Representative before election
Stephen Lynch (inc.)
Democratic
Elected U.S. Representative
Stephen Lynch
Democratic

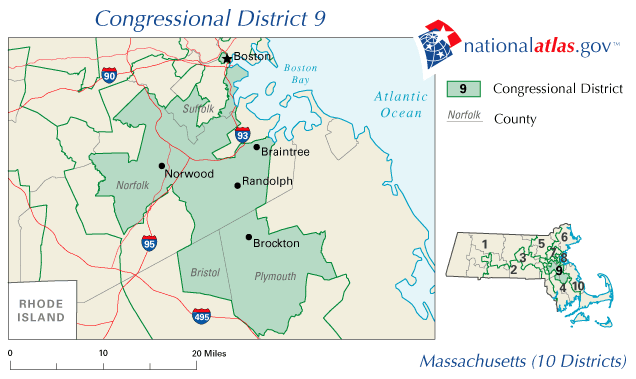

Massachusetts's 9th congressional district lies in the eastern part of the state, including part of Boston and some of its southern suburbs. It has been represented by Democrat Stephen Lynch since October 2001.

=== Predictions ===
Source	Ranking	As of
The Cook Political Report	Safe D	November 6, 2008
Rothenberg	Safe D	November 2, 2008
Sabato's Crystal Ball	Safe D	November 6, 2008
Real Clear Politics	Safe D	November 7, 2008
CQ Politics	Safe D	November 6, 2008

Massachusetts's 9th congressional district election, 2008
Party	Candidate	Votes	%
Democratic	Stephen Lynch (inc.)	242,166	98.72
Write-ins		3,128	1.28
Total votes		245,294	100.00
Democratic hold			

== District 10 ==
2008 Massachusetts's 10th congressional district election
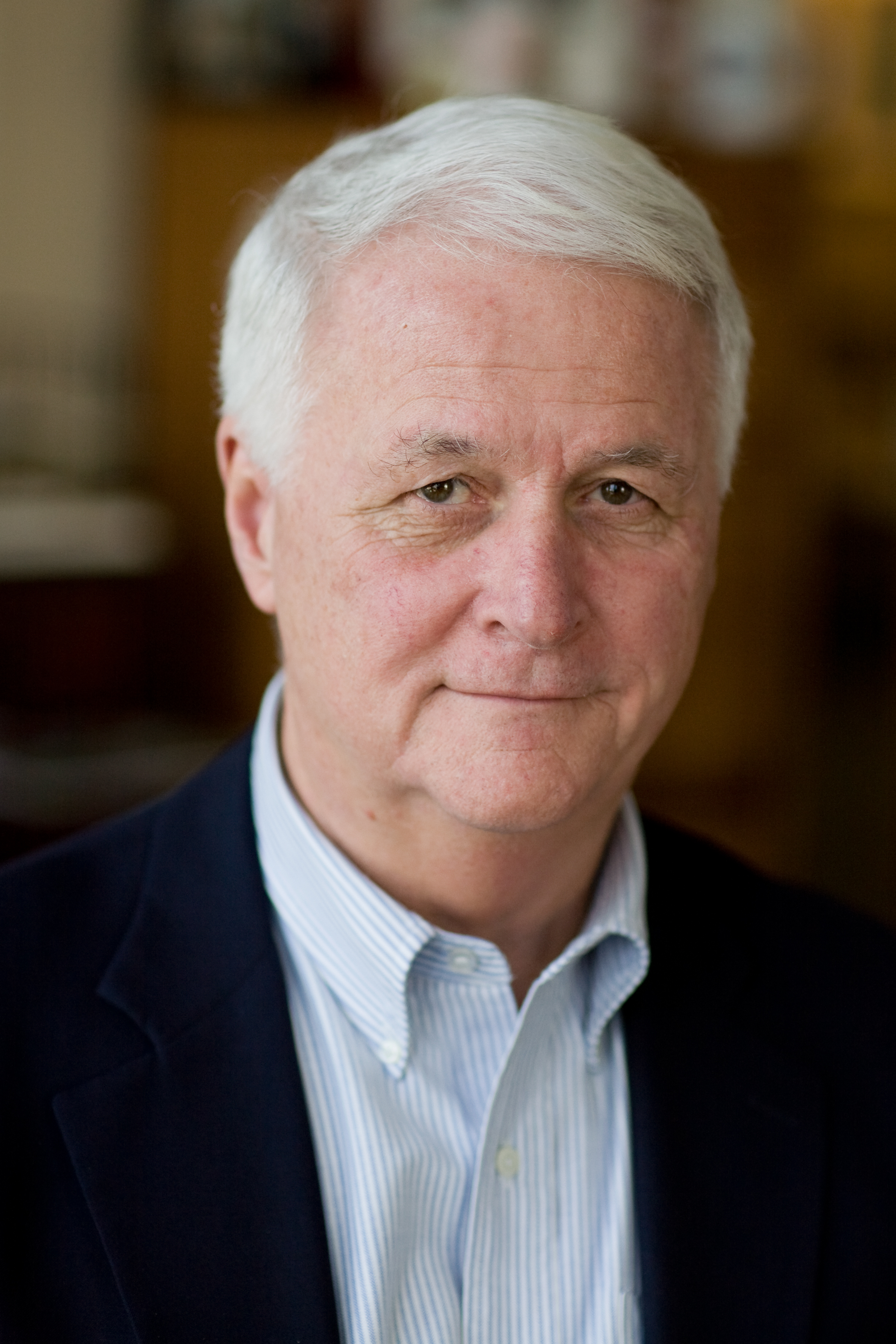
Nominee	Bill Delahunt
Party	Democratic
Popular vote	272,899
Percentage	98.6%
U.S. Representative before election
Bill Delahunt (inc.)
Democratic
Elected U.S. Representative
Bill Delahunt
Democratic

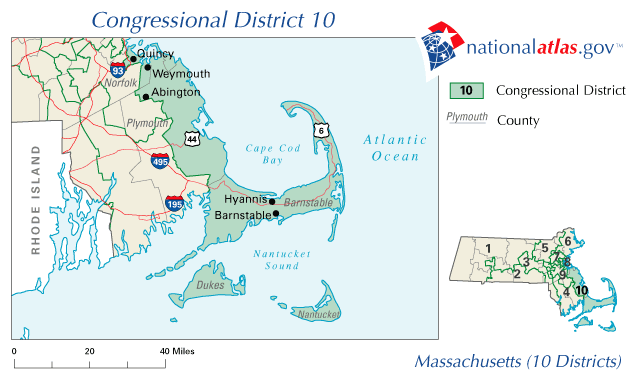

Massachusetts's 10th congressional district covers the south-east part of the state, including parts of the South Shore and all of Cape Cod and The Islands. It has been represented by Democrat Bill Delahunt since 1997.

=== Predictions ===
Source	Ranking	As of
The Cook Political Report	Safe D	November 6, 2008
Rothenberg	Safe D	November 2, 2008
Sabato's Crystal Ball	Safe D	November 6, 2008
Real Clear Politics	Safe D	November 7, 2008
CQ Politics	Safe D	November 6, 2008

Massachusetts's 9th congressional district election, 2008
Party	Candidate	Votes	%
Democratic	Bill Delahunt (inc.)	272,899	98.64
Write-ins		3,774	1.36
Total votes		276,673	100.00
Democratic hold			
