= 2024 United States House of Representatives elections in Massachusetts =

American election

- November 5, 2024

All 9 Massachusetts seats to the United States House of Representatives
	Majority party	Minority party	Third party
Party	Democratic	Republican	Independent
Last election	9	0	0
Seats won	9	0	0
Seat change	Steady	Steady	Steady
Popular vote	2,386,170	304,460	248,449
Percentage	80.19%	10.23%	8.35%
Swing	▲10.79%	▼19.74%	▲7.72%

Democratic
50–60%
60–70%
70–80%
80–90%
90–100%
Republican
50–60%
Independent
50–60%

The 2024 United States House of Representatives elections in Massachusetts were held on November 5, 2024, to elect the nine U.S. representatives from the State of Massachusetts, one from all nine of the state's congressional districts. The elections coincided with the 2024 U.S. presidential election, as well as other elections to the House of Representatives, elections to the United States Senate, and various state and local elections. The primary elections took place on September 3, 2024.

== Overview ==
=== Statewide ===
Party	Candi- dates	Votes		Seats		
Party	Candi- dates	No.	%	No.	+/–	%
Democratic Party	9	2,386,143	80.18%	9	Steady	100%
Republican Party	2	304,460	10.23%	0	Steady	0%
Independent	2	247,617	8.32%	0	Steady	0%
Write-ins	–	37,943	1.27%	0	Steady	0%
Total	13	2,976,163	100%	9	Steady	100%

Popular vote
Democratic	80.18%
Republican	10.23%
Independent	8.32%
Other	1.27%

House seats
Democratic	100.0%

=== District ===
District	Democratic		Republican		Others		Total		Result
District	Votes	%	Votes	%	Votes	%	Votes	%	Result
District 1	223,325	62.37%	0	0.00%	134,733	37.63%	358,058	100.0%	Democratic hold
District 2	251,441	68.64%	0	0.00%	114,887	31.36%	366,328	100.0%	Democratic hold
District 3	264,698	97.47%	0	0.00%	6,861	2.53%	271,559	100.0%	Democratic hold
District 4	289,347	97.19%	0	0.00%	8,378	2.81%	297,725	100.0%	Democratic hold
District 5	286,689	98.22%	0	0.00%	5,201	1.78%	291,890	100.0%	Democratic hold
District 6	321,186	97.81%	0	0.00%	7,191	2.19%	328,377	100.0%	Democratic hold
District 7	232,094	97.11%	0	0.00%	6,907	2.89%	239,001	100.0%	Democratic hold
District 8	265,432	70.44%	110,638	29.36%	760	0.20%	376,830	100.0%	Democratic hold
District 9	251,931	56.44%	193,822	43.42%	642	0.14%	446,395	100.0%	Democratic hold
Total	2,386,143	80.18%	304,460	10.23%	285,560	9.59%	2,976,163	100.0%	

== District 1 ==
2024 Massachusetts's 1st congressional district election
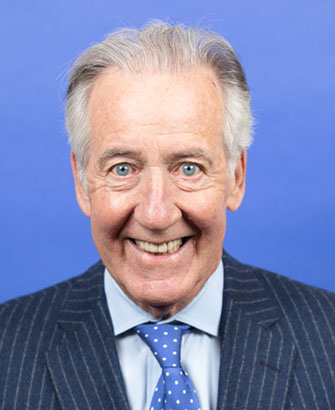

Nominee	Richard Neal	Nadia Milleron
Party	Democratic	Independent
Popular vote	223,325	133,532
Percentage	62.4%	37.3%
- Neal: 40–50% 50–60% 60–70% 70–80% 80–90% Milleron: 40–50% 50–60%
U.S. Representative before election
Richard Neal
Democratic
Elected U.S. Representative
Richard Neal
Democratic

The 1st congressional district is in western Massachusetts and includes Springfield and Pittsfield. The incumbent was Richard Neal, who was re-elected with 61.6% of the vote in 2022.

=== Democratic primary ===
==== Nominee ====
- Richard Neal, incumbent U.S. representative

==== Endorsements ====
Richard Neal

Organizations

- AIPAC
- Democratic Majority for Israel
- Humane Society Legislative Fund
- J Street PAC

==== Fundraising ====
Campaign finance reports as of December 31, 2023
Candidate	Raised	Spent	Cash on hand
Richard Neal (D)	$1,328,040	$1,137,529	$3,674,600
Source: Federal Election Commission

==== Results ====
Democratic primary results
Party	Candidate	Votes	%
Democratic	Richard Neal (incumbent)	56,364	99.1
Write-in		528	0.9
Total votes		56,892	100.0

=== Independents ===
==== Declared ====
- Nadia Milleron, aviation safety advocate and niece of Ralph Nader

==== Endorsements ====
Nadia Milleron

Individuals

- Justin Hurst, former mayoral candidate (Springfield, MA)

=== General election ===
==== Predictions ====
Source	Ranking	As of
The Cook Political Report	Solid D	July 28, 2023
Inside Elections	Solid D	July 28, 2023
Sabato's Crystal Ball	Safe D	June 8, 2023
Elections Daily	Safe D	June 8, 2023
CNalysis	Solid D	November 16, 2023

==== Results ====
2024 Massachusetts's 1st congressional district election
Party	Candidate	Votes	%
Democratic	Richard Neal (incumbent)	223,325	62.4
Independent	Nadia Milleron	133,552	37.3
Write-in		1,181	0.3
Total votes		358,058	100.0
Democratic hold			

== District 2 ==
2024 Massachusetts's 2nd congressional district election
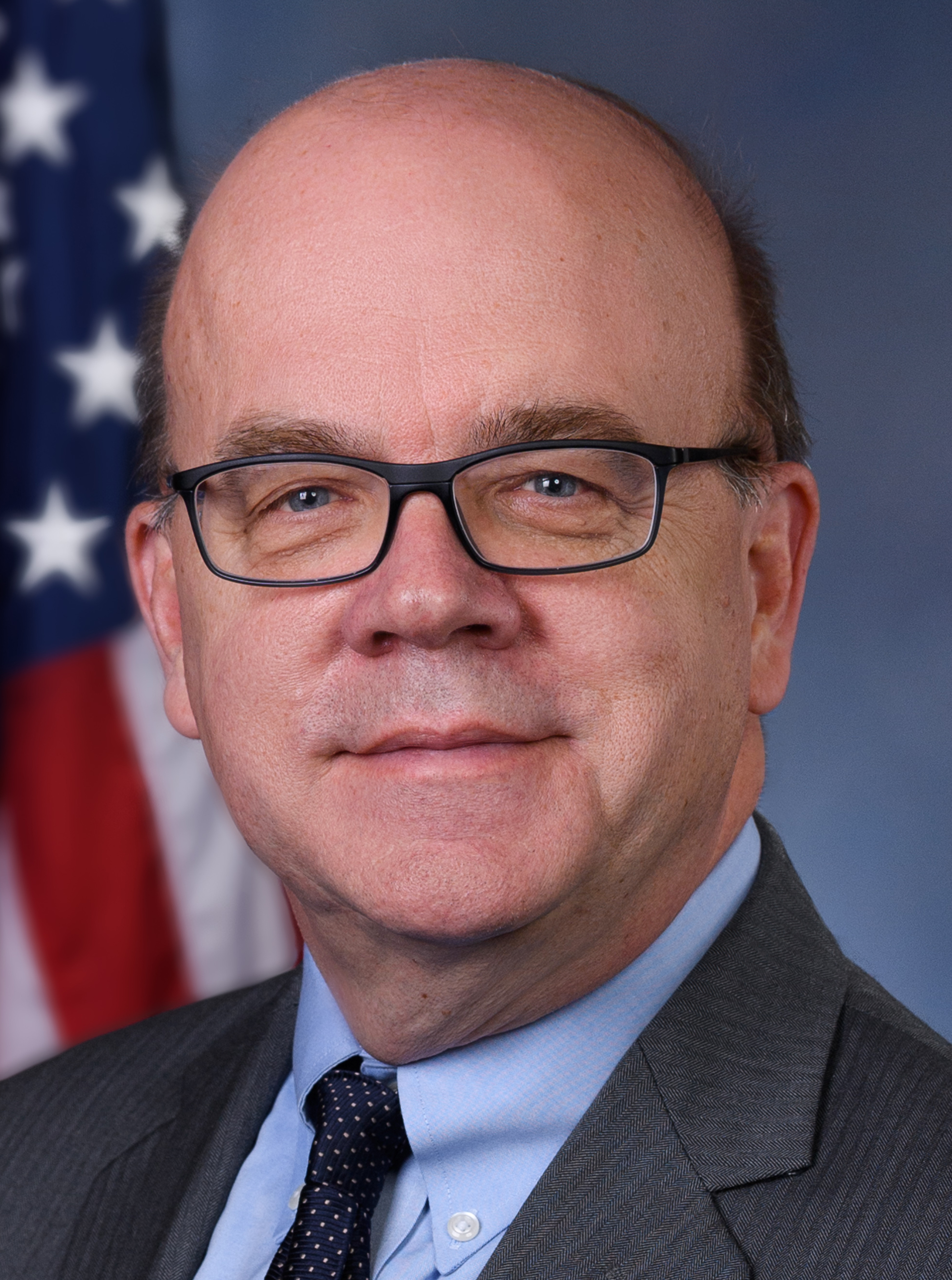

Nominee	Jim McGovern	Cornelius Shea
Party	Democratic	Independent
Popular vote	251,441	114,065
Percentage	68.6%	31.1%
- McGovern: 50–60% 60–70% 70–80% 80–90% >90% Shea: 50–60%
U.S. Representative before election
Jim McGovern
Democratic
Elected U.S. Representative
Jim McGovern
Democratic

The 2nd congressional district is in central Massachusetts and includes Worcester. The incumbent was Democrat Jim McGovern, who was re-elected with 66.3% of the vote in 2022.

=== Democratic primary ===
==== Nominee ====
- Jim McGovern, incumbent U.S. representative

==== Endorsements ====
Jim McGovern

Organizations

- Feminist Majority PAC
- Humane Society Legislative Fund
- J Street PAC
- Planned Parenthood Action Fund

Labor unions

- National Nurses United

==== Fundraising ====
Campaign finance reports as of December 31, 2023
Candidate	Raised	Spent	Cash on hand
Jim McGovern (D)	$483,671	$448,298	$402,750
Source: Federal Election Commission

==== Results ====
Democratic primary results
Party	Candidate	Votes	%
Democratic	Jim McGovern (incumbent)	56,343	99.6
Write-in		225	0.4
Total votes		56,568	100.0

=== Independents ===
- Cornelius Shea, Marine Corps veteran

=== General election ===
==== Predictions ====
Source	Ranking	As of
The Cook Political Report	Solid D	July 28, 2023
Inside Elections	Solid D	July 28, 2023
Sabato's Crystal Ball	Safe D	June 8, 2023
Elections Daily	Safe D	June 8, 2023
CNalysis	Solid D	November 16, 2023

==== Results ====
2024 Massachusetts's 2nd congressional district election
Party	Candidate	Votes	%
Democratic	Jim McGovern (incumbent)	251,441	68.6
Independent	Cornelius Shea	114,065	31.1
Write-in		822	0.2
Total votes		366,328	100.0
Democratic hold			

== District 3 ==
2024 Massachusetts's 3rd congressional district election
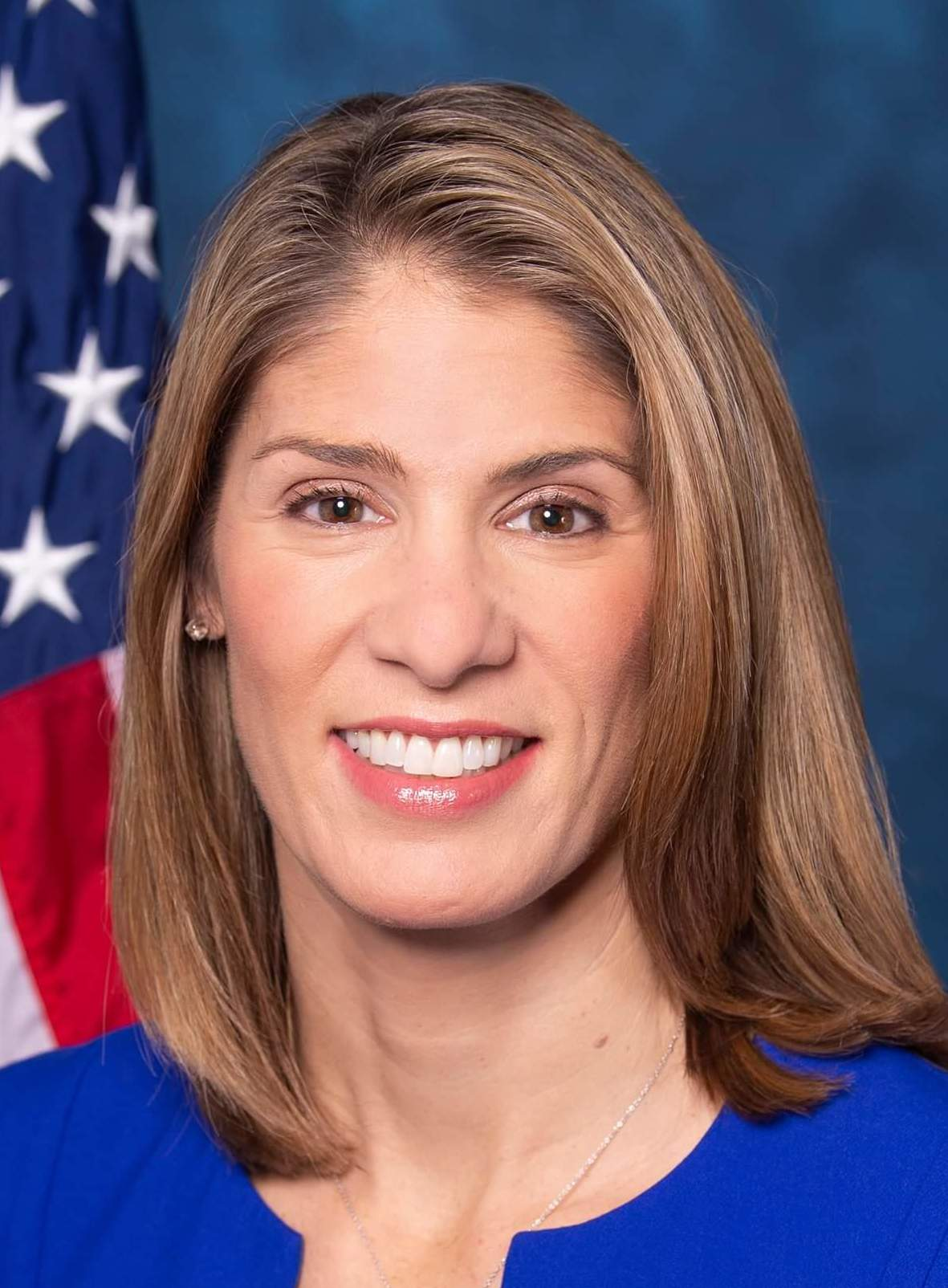
Nominee	Lori Trahan
Party	Democratic
Popular vote	264,698
Percentage	97.5%
- Trahan: 90%+
U.S. Representative before election
Lori Trahan
Democratic
Elected U.S. Representative
Lori Trahan
Democratic

The 3rd congressional district is in northeastern and central Massachusetts and includes Lowell and Lawrence. The incumbent was Lori Trahan, who was re-elected with 63.6% of the vote in 2022.

=== Democratic primary ===
==== Nominee ====
- Lori Trahan, incumbent U.S. representative

==== Endorsements ====
Lori Trahan

Organizations

- Giffords
- Humane Society Legislative Fund
- J Street PAC
- VoteVets

==== Fundraising ====
Campaign finance reports as of December 31, 2023
Candidate	Raised	Spent	Cash on hand
Lori Trahan (D)	$670,277	$419,057	$1,118,719
Source: Federal Election Commission

==== Results ====
Democratic primary results
Party	Candidate	Votes	%
Democratic	Lori Trahan (incumbent)	54,612	99.4
Write-in		357	0.6
Total votes		54,969	100.0

=== General election ===
==== Predictions ====
Source	Ranking	As of
The Cook Political Report	Solid D	July 28, 2023
Inside Elections	Solid D	July 28, 2023
Sabato's Crystal Ball	Safe D	June 8, 2023
Elections Daily	Safe D	June 8, 2023
CNalysis	Solid D	November 16, 2023

==== Results ====
2024 Massachusetts's 3rd congressional district election
Party	Candidate	Votes	%
Democratic	Lori Trahan (incumbent)	264,698	97.5
Write-in		6,861	2.5
Total votes		271,559	100.0
Democratic hold			

== District 4 ==
2024 Massachusetts's 4th congressional district election
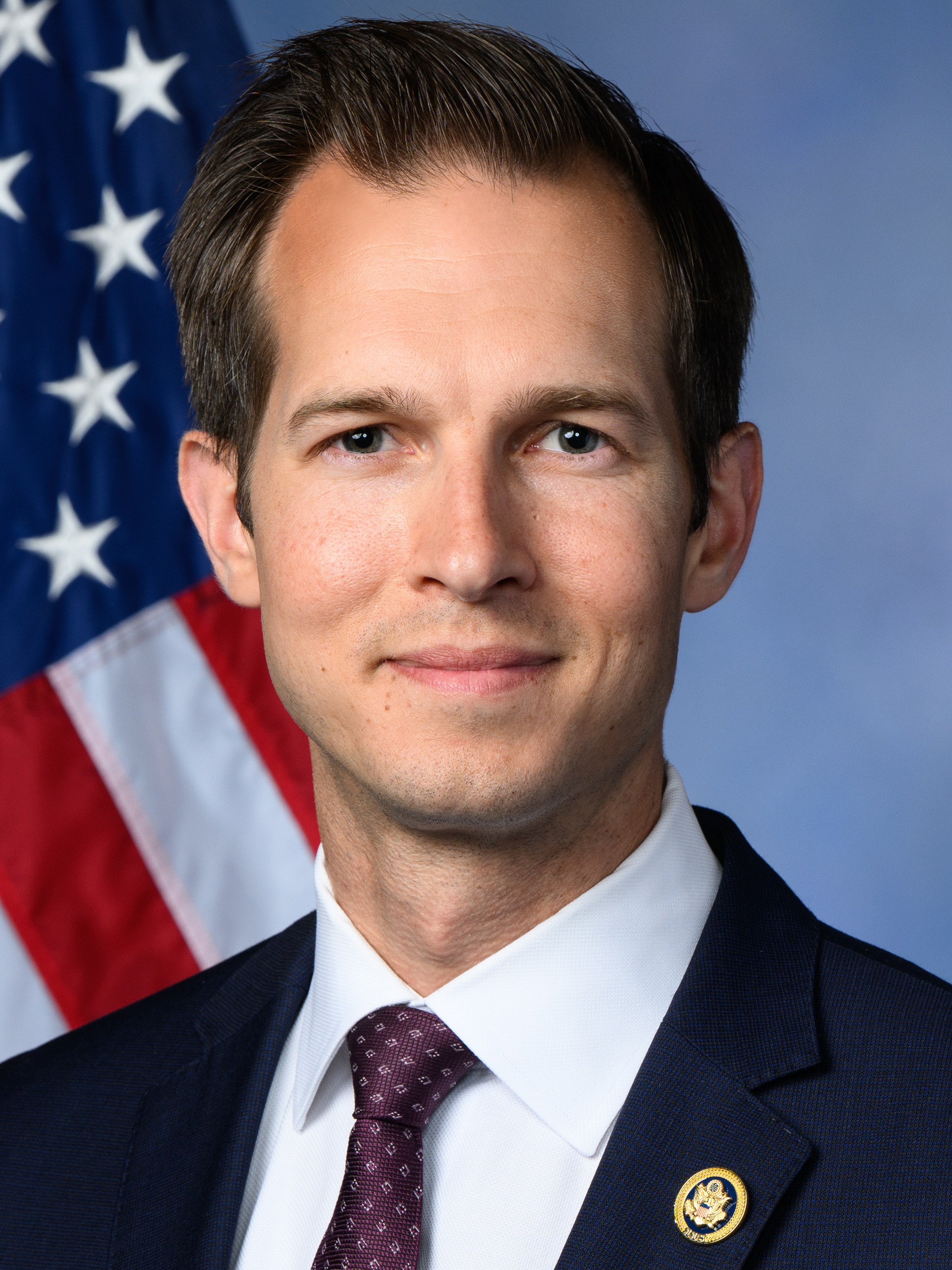
Nominee	Jake Auchincloss
Party	Democratic
Popular vote	289,347
Percentage	97.2%
- Auchincloss: 90%+
U.S. Representative before election
Jake Auchincloss
Democratic
Elected U.S. Representative
Jake Auchincloss
Democratic

The 4th district contains much of southeastern Massachusetts and includes Newton, Attleboro, and Fall River. The incumbent was Jake Auchincloss, who ran uncontested in 2022.

=== Democratic primary ===
==== Nominee ====
- Jake Auchincloss, incumbent U.S. representative

==== Endorsements ====
Jake Auchincloss

U.S representatives

- Seth Moulton, U.S. representative from Massachusetts's 6th congressional district (2015–present)

Organizations

- AIPAC
- DMFI PAC
- Humane Society Legislative Fund
- Jewish Democratic Council of America
- Pro-Israel America

==== Fundraising ====
Campaign finance reports as of December 31, 2023
Candidate	Raised	Spent	Cash on hand
Jake Auchincloss (D)	$1,547,565	$521,418	$3,480,411
Source: Federal Election Commission

==== Results ====
Democratic primary results
Party	Candidate	Votes	%
Democratic	Jake Auchincloss (incumbent)	64,238	98.9
Write-in		742	1.1
Total votes		64,980	100.0

=== General election ===
==== Predictions ====
Source	Ranking	As of
The Cook Political Report	Solid D	July 28, 2023
Inside Elections	Solid D	July 28, 2023
Sabato's Crystal Ball	Safe D	June 8, 2023
Elections Daily	Safe D	June 8, 2023
CNalysis	Solid D	November 16, 2023

==== Results ====
2024 Massachusetts's 4th congressional district election
Party	Candidate	Votes	%
Democratic	Jake Auchincloss (incumbent)	289,347	97.2
Write-in		8,378	2.8
Total votes		297,725	100.0
Democratic hold			

== District 5 ==
2024 Massachusetts's 5th congressional district election
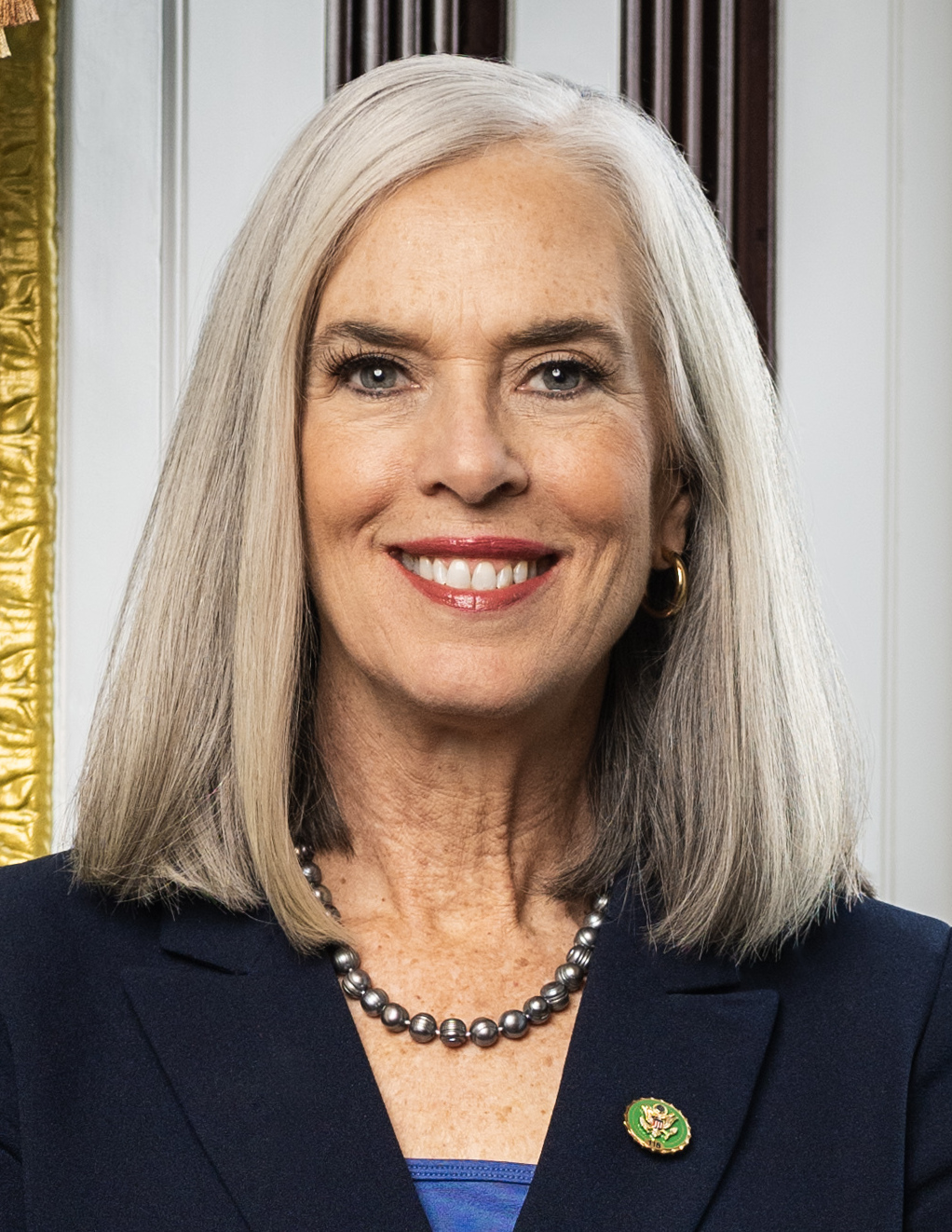
Nominee	Katherine Clark
Party	Democratic
Popular vote	286,689
Percentage	98.2%
- Clark: 90%+
U.S. Representative before election
Katherine Clark
Democratic
Elected U.S. Representative
Katherine Clark
Democratic

The 5th district represents parts of eastern Massachusetts and includes Framingham, Medford, and parts of Cambridge. The incumbent was Democrat Katherine Clark, who was re-elected with 74.0% of the vote in 2022.

=== Democratic primary ===
==== Nominee ====
- Katherine Clark, incumbent U.S. representative

==== Endorsements ====
Katherine Clark

Organizations

- AIPAC
- Democratic Majority for Israel
- Everytown for Gun Safety Action Fund
- Feminist Majority PAC
- Humane Society Legislative Fund
- J Street PAC
- Joint Action Committee for Political Affairs
- League of Conservation Voters
- National Organization for Women PAC
- Natural Resources Defense Council
- Planned Parenthood Action Fund
- Population Connection Action Fund

==== Fundraising ====
Campaign finance reports as of December 31, 2023
Candidate	Raised	Spent	Cash on hand
Katherine Clark (D)	$2,540,342	$2,219,689	$1,427,802
Source: Federal Election Commission

==== Results ====
Democratic primary results
Party	Candidate	Votes	%
Democratic	Katherine Clark (incumbent)	76,806	99.2
Write-in		614	0.8
Total votes		76,806	100.0

=== General election ===
==== Predictions ====
Source	Ranking	As of
The Cook Political Report	Solid D	July 28, 2023
Inside Elections	Solid D	July 28, 2023
Sabato's Crystal Ball	Safe D	June 8, 2023
Elections Daily	Safe D	June 8, 2023
CNalysis	Solid D	November 16, 2023

==== Results ====
2024 Massachusetts's 5th congressional district election
Party	Candidate	Votes	%
Democratic	Katherine Clark (incumbent)	286,689	98.2
Write-in		5,201	1.8
Total votes		291,890	100.0
Democratic hold			

== District 6 ==
2024 Massachusetts's 6th congressional district election
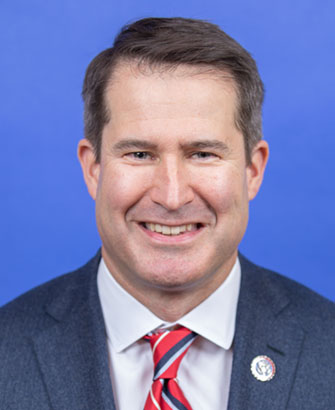
Nominee	Seth Moulton
Party	Democratic
Popular vote	321,186
Percentage	97.8%
- Moulton: 90%+
U.S. Representative before election
Seth Moulton
Democratic
Elected U.S. Representative
Seth Moulton
Democratic

The 6th district represents northeastern Massachusetts and includes Salem, Peabody, and Gloucester. The incumbent was Democrat Seth Moulton, who was re-elected with 62.9% of the vote in 2022.

=== Democratic primary ===
==== Nominee ====
- Seth Moulton, incumbent U.S. representative

==== Endorsements ====
Seth Moulton

Organizations

- Humane Society Legislative Fund
- J Street PAC

Labor unions

- Association of Flight Attendants

==== Fundraising ====
Campaign finance reports as of December 31, 2023
Candidate	Raised	Spent	Cash on hand
Seth Moulton (D)	$990,249	$843,711	$915,852
Source: Federal Election Commission

==== Results ====
Democratic primary results
Party	Candidate	Votes	%
Democratic	Seth Moulton (incumbent)	62,986	99.4
Write-in		394	0.6
Total votes		63,380	100.0

=== General election ===
==== Predictions ====
Source	Ranking	As of
The Cook Political Report	Solid D	July 28, 2023
Inside Elections	Solid D	July 28, 2023
Sabato's Crystal Ball	Safe D	June 8, 2023
Elections Daily	Safe D	June 8, 2023
CNalysis	Solid D	November 16, 2023

==== Results ====
2024 Massachusetts's 6th congressional district election
Party	Candidate	Votes	%
Democratic	Seth Moulton (incumbent)	321,186	97.8
Write-in		7,191	2.2
Total votes		328,377	100.0
Democratic hold			

== District 7 ==
2024 Massachusetts's 7th congressional district election
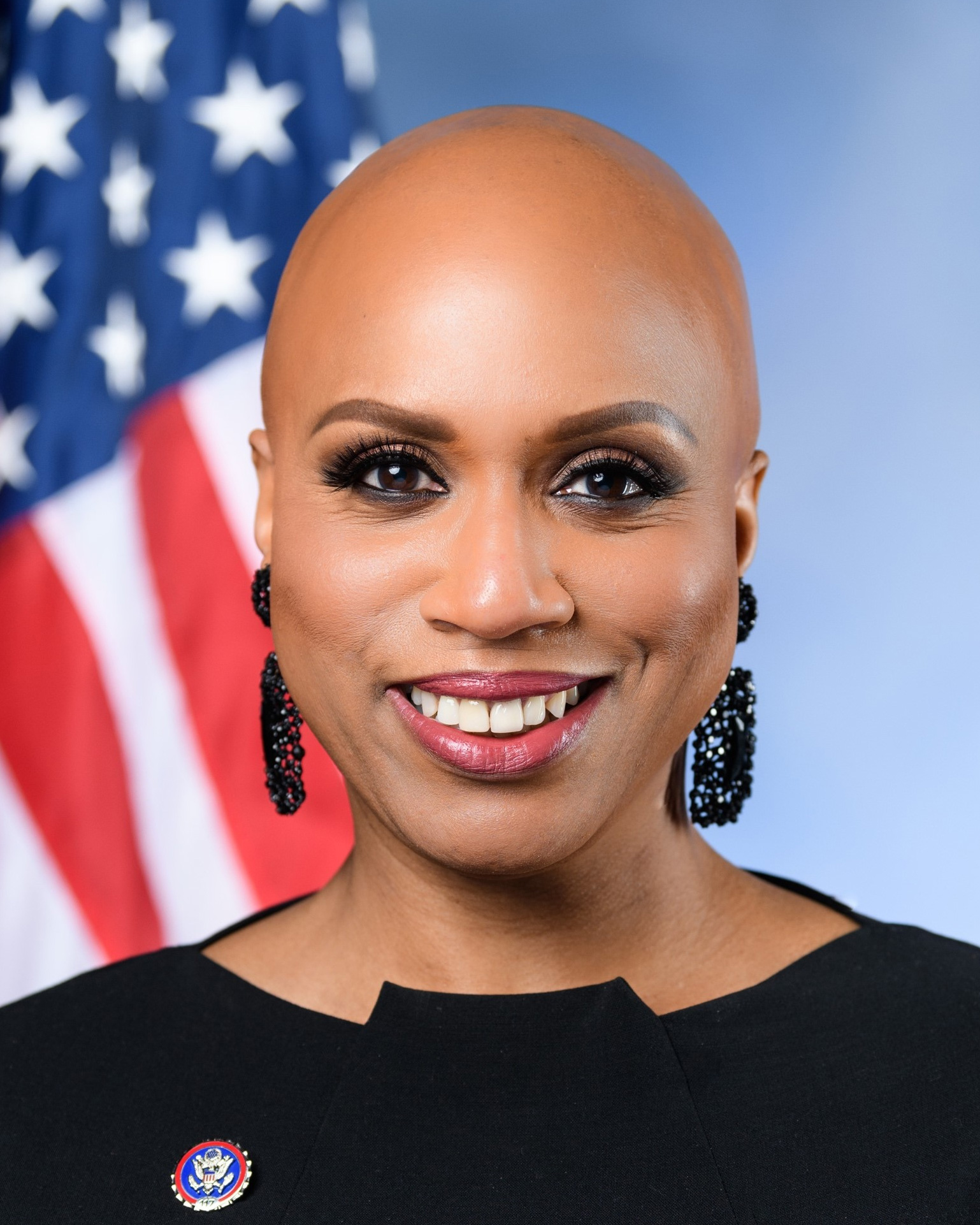
Nominee	Ayanna Pressley
Party	Democratic
Popular vote	232,094
Percentage	97.1%
- Pressley: >90%
U.S. Representative before election
Ayanna Pressley
Democratic
Elected U.S. Representative
Ayanna Pressley
Democratic

The 7th district represents much of Boston and its suburbs. The incumbent was Democrat Ayanna Pressley, who was re-elected in with 84.8% of the vote in 2022.

=== Democratic primary ===
==== Nominee ====
- Ayanna Pressley, incumbent U.S. representative

==== Declined ====
- Josh Kraft, nonprofit executive and son of New England Patriots owner Robert Kraft

==== Endorsements ====
Ayanna Pressley

Organizations

- Feminist Majority PAC
- Friends of the Earth Action
- Giffords
- Humane Society Legislative Fund
- Justice Democrats
- National Organization for Women PAC
- National Women's Political Caucus
- Planned Parenthood Action Fund
- Population Connection Action Fund
- Sunrise Movement

==== Fundraising ====
Campaign finance reports as of December 31, 2023
Candidate	Raised	Spent	Cash on hand
Ayanna Pressley (D)	$586,240	$667,673	$240,853
Source: Federal Election Commission

==== Results ====
Democratic primary results
Party	Candidate	Votes	%
Democratic	Ayanna Pressley (incumbent)	57,172	98.2
Write-in		1,020	1.8
Total votes		58,192	100.0

=== General election ===
==== Predictions ====
Source	Ranking	As of
The Cook Political Report	Solid D	July 28, 2023
Inside Elections	Solid D	July 28, 2023
Sabato's Crystal Ball	Safe D	June 8, 2023
Elections Daily	Safe D	June 8, 2023
CNalysis	Solid D	November 16, 2023

==== Results ====
2024 Massachusetts's 7th congressional district election
Party	Candidate	Votes	%
Democratic	Ayanna Pressley (incumbent)	232,094	97.1
Write-in		6,907	2.9
Total votes		239,001	100.0
Democratic hold			

== District 8 ==
2024 Massachusetts's 8th congressional district election
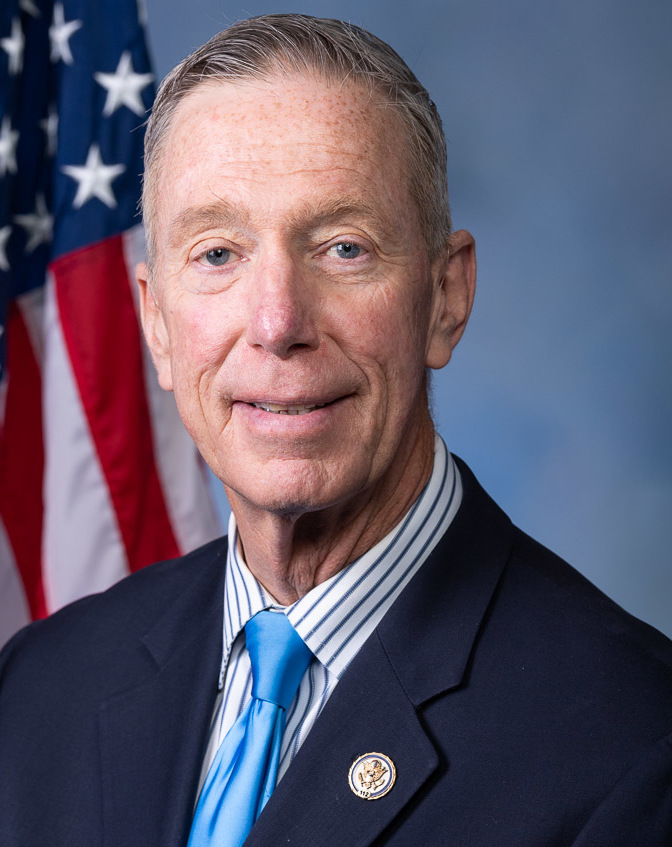

Nominee	Stephen Lynch	Robert Burke
Party	Democratic	Republican
Popular vote	265,432	110,638
Percentage	70.4%	29.4%
- Lynch: 50–60% 60–70% 70–80% 80–90% >90% No votes
U.S. Representative before election
Stephen Lynch
Democratic
Elected U.S. Representative
Stephen Lynch
Democratic

The 8th district parts of Boston and eastern Massachusetts. The incumbent was Democrat Stephen Lynch, who was re-elected with 69.8% of the vote in 2022.

=== Democratic primary ===
==== Nominee ====
- Stephen Lynch, incumbent U.S. representative

==== Endorsements ====
Stephen F. Lynch

Organizations

- Humane Society Legislative Fund

==== Fundraising ====
Campaign finance reports as of December 31, 2023
Candidate	Raised	Spent	Cash on hand
Stephen Lynch (D)	$308,966	$487,698	$1,176,177
Source: Federal Election Commission

==== Results ====
Democratic primary results
Party	Candidate	Votes	%
Democratic	Stephen Lynch (incumbent)	64,761	98.7
Write-in		861	1.3
Total votes		65,622	100.0

=== Republican primary ===
==== Nominee ====
- Robert Burke, videographer and nominee for this district in 2022

==== Eliminated in primary ====
- James Govatsos, retired businessman
- Daniel Kelly, bar owner

==== Results ====
Republican primary results
Party	Candidate	Votes	%
Republican	Robert Burke	10,335	46.1
Republican	James Govatsos	6,216	27.7
Republican	Daniel Kelly	5,761	25.7
Write-in		127	0.6
Total votes		22,439	100.0

=== General election ===
==== Predictions ====
Source	Ranking	As of
The Cook Political Report	Solid D	July 28, 2023
Inside Elections	Solid D	July 28, 2023
Sabato's Crystal Ball	Safe D	June 8, 2023
Elections Daily	Safe D	June 8, 2023
CNalysis	Solid D	November 16, 2023

==== Results ====
2024 Massachusetts's 8th congressional district election
Party	Candidate	Votes	%
Democratic	Stephen Lynch (incumbent)	265,432	70.4
Republican	Robert Burke	110,638	29.4
Write-in		760	0.2
Total votes		376,830	100.0
Democratic hold			

== District 9 ==
2024 Massachusetts's 9th congressional district election
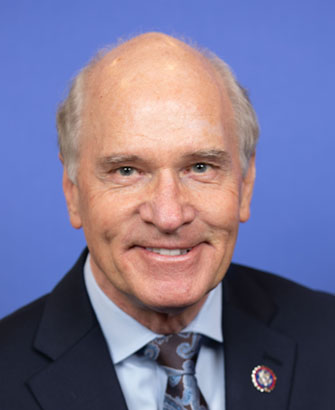

Nominee	Bill Keating	Dan Sullivan
Party	Democratic	Republican
Popular vote	251,931	193,822
Percentage	56.4%	43.4%
- Municipality results Keating: 50–60% 60–70% 70–80% 80–90% 90–100% Sullivan: 50–60%
U.S. Representative before election
Bill Keating
Democratic
Elected U.S. Representative
Bill Keating
Democratic

The 9th district encompasses Cape Cod and the South Shore, and extends westward into New Bedford and surrounding suburbs. The incumbent was Democrat Bill Keating, who was re-elected with 59.2% of the vote in 2022.

=== Democratic primary ===
==== Nominee ====
- Bill Keating, incumbent U.S. representative

==== Endorsements ====
Bill Keating

Organizations

- AIPAC
- Humane Society Legislative Fund
- J Street PAC

==== Fundraising ====
Campaign finance reports as of December 31, 2023
Candidate	Raised	Spent	Cash on hand
Bill Keating (D)	$306,692	$369,664	$798,354
Source: Federal Election Commission

==== Results ====
Democratic primary results
Party	Candidate	Votes	%
Democratic	Bill Keating (incumbent)	71,814	99.6
Write-in		275	0.4
Total votes		72,089	100.0

=== Republican primary ===
==== Nominee ====
- Dan Sullivan, nurse and candidate for this district in 2022

==== Endorsements ====
Dan Sullivan

Individuals

- Jay McMahon, Republican nominee for Massachusetts attorney general in 2018 and 2022

Organizations

- Log Cabin Republicans PAC

==== Results ====
Republican primary results
Party	Candidate	Votes	%
Republican	Dan Sullivan	36,888	98.5
Write-in		549	1.5
Total votes		37,437	100.0

=== General election ===
==== Predictions ====
Source	Ranking	As of
The Cook Political Report	Solid D	July 28, 2023
Inside Elections	Solid D	July 28, 2023
Sabato's Crystal Ball	Safe D	June 8, 2023
Elections Daily	Safe D	June 8, 2023
CNalysis	Solid D	November 16, 2023

==== Results ====
2024 Massachusetts's 9th congressional district election
Party	Candidate	Votes	%
Democratic	Bill Keating (incumbent)	251,931	56.4
Republican	Dan Sullivan	193,822	43.4
Write-in		642	0.1
Total votes		446,395	100.0
Democratic hold			
