= Massachusetts's 1st congressional district =

U.S. House district for Massachusetts

Coordinates: 42°19′52″N 72°51′51″W

- Interactive map of district boundaries since January 3, 2023
- Representative: Richard Neal; D–Springfield
- Area: 3,101.14 mi^{2} (8,031.9 km^{2})
- Distribution: 69.21% urban; 30.79% rural
- Population (2025): 783,273
- Median household income: $79,423
- Ethnicity: 69.4% White; 18.7% Hispanic; 5.5% Black; 3.6% Two or more races; 2.2% Asian; 0.6% other
- Occupation: 59.7% White-collar; 23.8% Blue-collar; 16.4% Gray-collar
- Cook PVI: D+8

Massachusetts's 1st congressional district covers the western portion and the south of the central portion of the state. It is the largest and most sparsely populated district in the state, covering about 30% of the state's land area. The largest cities in the district are Springfield, Chicopee, Pittsfield, Westfield, and Holyoke.

Richard Neal, a Democrat from Springfield, represents the district; he previously represented the old 2nd from 1989 to 2013.

== Cities and towns represented ==
As of the 2021 redistricting cycle, the 1st district contains 83 municipalities:

Berkshire County (32)

All 32 municipalities

Franklin County (4)

Charlemont, Hawley, Monroe, Rowe

Hampden County (23)

All 23 municipalities

Hampshire County (11)

Belchertown, Cummington, Easthampton, Granby, Huntington, Middlefield, Plainfield, South Hadley, Southampton, Ware, Worthington

Worcester County (13)

Brookfield, Charlton, Dudley, East Brookfield, New Braintree, North Brookfield, Southbridge, Spencer, Sturbridge, Oxford, Warren, Webster (part; also 2nd; includes part of Webster CDP), West Brookfield

=== History of district boundaries ===
After the 2010 census, the 1st district shifted from covering the western and north-central portions of the state to covering the western and south-central portions of the state. Following the 2020 census, the 1st district boundaries did not shift as drastically but moved to cover somewhat less of the western portions of Franklin and Hampshire Counties while encompassing more of Worcester and southeastern Hampshire Counties.

== Recent election results from statewide races ==
Year	Office	Results
2008	President	Obama 63% - 35%
2008	Senate	Kerry 70% - 30%
2010	Senate (Spec.)	Brown 52% - 48%
2010	Governor	Patrick 49% - 38%
2012	President	Obama 64% - 36%
2012	Senate	Warren 56% - 44%
2014	Senate	Markey 61% - 39%
2014	Governor	Baker 46% - 44%
2016	President	Clinton 55% - 37%
2018	Senate	Warren 57% - 39%
2018	Governor	Baker 68% - 31%
2018	Secretary of the Commonwealth	Galvin 66% - 29%
2018	Attorney General	Healey 65% - 35%
2018	Treasurer and Receiver-General	Goldberg 63% - 31%
2018	Auditor	Bump 60% - 33%
2020	President	Biden 60% - 38%
2020	Senate	Markey 60% - 38%
2022	Governor	Healey 58% - 41%
2022	Secretary of the Commonwealth	Galvin 61% - 35%
2022	Attorney General	Campbell 57% - 43%
2022	Auditor	DiZoglio 49% - 42%
2024	President	Harris 56% - 42%
2024	Senate	Warren 56% - 44%

== List of members representing the district ==
Member	Party	Years	Cong ress	Electoral history	District location
District created March 4, 1789
Fisher Ames (Dedham)	Pro-Administration	March 4, 1789 – March 3, 1793	1st 2nd	Elected in 1788. Re-elected in 1790.	1789–1793; Suffolk County
Fisher Ames (Dedham)	Pro-Administration	General ticket: Four members from the same district March 4, 1793 – March 3, 1795	3rd	Re-elected in 1792 with three others on a general ticket representing the district from Suffolk County. Redistricted to the 8th district.	1793–1795; Suffolk County, Middlesex County, and Essex County
Samuel Dexter (Lunenburg)	Pro-Administration	General ticket: Four members from the same district March 4, 1793 – March 3, 1795	3rd	Elected in 1792 with three others on a general ticket representing the district from Middlesex County. Redistricted to the 9th district and lost re-election.	1793–1795; Suffolk County, Middlesex County, and Essex County
Benjamin Goodhue (Salem)	Pro-Administration	General ticket: Four members from the same district March 4, 1793 – March 3, 1795	3rd	Redistricted from the 2nd district and re-elected in 1792 with three others on a general ticket representing the district from Essex County. Redistricted to the 10th district.	1793–1795; Suffolk County, Middlesex County, and Essex County
Samuel Holten (Danvers)	Anti-Administration	General ticket: Four members from the same district March 4, 1793 – March 3, 1795	3rd	Elected in 1792 with three others on a general ticket representing the district at-large. Redistricted to the 10th district and lost re-election.	1793–1795; Suffolk County, Middlesex County, and Essex County
Theodore Sedgwick (Great Barrington)	Federalist	March 4, 1795 – June 11, 1796	4th	Redistricted from the 2nd district and re-elected in 1794. Resigned to become U.S. Senator.	1795–1803 "1st Western district"
Vacant		June 1796 – January 27, 1797	4th		1795–1803 "1st Western district"
Thomson J. Skinner (Williamstown)	Democratic-Republican	January 27, 1797 – March 3, 1799	4th	Elected to finish Sedgwick's term. Re-elected in 1796. Retired.	1795–1803 "1st Western district"
Thomson J. Skinner (Williamstown)	Democratic-Republican	January 27, 1797 – March 3, 1799	5th	Elected to finish Sedgwick's term. Re-elected in 1796. Retired.	1795–1803 "1st Western district"
Theodore Sedgwick (Great Barrington)	Federalist	March 4, 1799 – March 3, 1801	6th	Elected in 1798. Retired.	1795–1803 "1st Western district"
John Bacon (Stockbridge)	Democratic-Republican	March 4, 1801 – March 3, 1803	7th	Elected in 1800. Retired.	1795–1803 "1st Western district"
William Eustis (Boston)	Democratic-Republican	March 4, 1803 – March 3, 1805	8th	Redistricted from the 8th district and re-elected in 1802. Lost re-election.	1803–1813 "Suffolk district"
Josiah Quincy III (Boston)	Federalist	March 4, 1805 – March 3, 1813	9th 10th 11th 12th	Elected in 1804. Re-elected in 1806. Re-elected in 1808. Re-elected in 1810. Retired.	1803–1813 "Suffolk district"
Artemas Ward Jr. (Boston)	Federalist	March 4, 1813 – March 3, 1817	13th 14th	Elected in 1812. Re-elected in 1814. Retired.	1813–1823 "Suffolk district"
Jonathan Mason (Boston)	Federalist	March 4, 1817 – May 15, 1820	15th 16th	Elected August 26, 1817 to Representative-elect James Lloyd's term and seated December 2, 1816. Re-elected in 1818. Resigned to pursue law practice.	1813–1823 "Suffolk district"
Vacant		May 15, 1820 – November 6, 1820	16th		1813–1823 "Suffolk district"
Benjamin Gorham (Boston)	Democratic-Republican	November 6, 1820 – March 3, 1823	16th 17th	Elected to finish Mason's term. Also elected to the next term in 1820. Retired.	1813–1823 "Suffolk district"
Daniel Webster (Boston)	Adams-Clay Federalist	March 4, 1823 – March 3, 1825	18th 19th 20th	Elected in 1822. Re-elected in 1824. Re-elected in 1826, but resigned to become U.S. Senator.	1823–1833 "Suffolk district"
Daniel Webster (Boston)	Anti-Jacksonian	March 4, 1825 – May 30, 1827	18th 19th 20th	Elected in 1822. Re-elected in 1824. Re-elected in 1826, but resigned to become U.S. Senator.	1823–1833 "Suffolk district"
Vacant		May 30, 1827 – July 23, 1827	20th		1823–1833 "Suffolk district"
Benjamin Gorham (Boston)	Anti-Jacksonian	July 23, 1827 – March 3, 1831	20th 21st	Elected to finish Webster's term. Re-elected in 1828. Retired.	1823–1833 "Suffolk district"
Nathan Appleton (Boston)	Anti-Jacksonian	March 4, 1831 – March 3, 1833	22nd	Elected in 1830. Retired.	1823–1833 "Suffolk district"
Benjamin Gorham (Boston)	Anti-Jacksonian	March 4, 1833 – March 3, 1835	23rd	Elected in 1833. [data missing]	1833–1843 [data missing]
Abbott Lawrence (Boston)	Anti-Jacksonian	March 4, 1835 – March 3, 1837	24th	Elected in 1834. Retired.	1833–1843 [data missing]
Richard Fletcher (Boston)	Whig	March 4, 1837 – March 3, 1839	25th	Elected in 1836. Re-elected in 1838, but declined to serve.	1833–1843 [data missing]
Vacant		March 4, 1839 – November 11, 1839	26th		1833–1843 [data missing]
Abbott Lawrence (Boston)	Whig	November 11, 1839 – September 18, 1840	26th	Elected to finish Fletcher's term. Resigned.	1833–1843 [data missing]
Vacant		September 18, 1840 – November 9, 1840	26th		1833–1843 [data missing]
Robert C. Winthrop (Boston)	Whig	November 9, 1840 – May 25, 1842	26th 27th	Elected to finish Lawrence's term. Also elected to the next term in 1840. Resigned.	1833–1843 [data missing]
Vacant		May 25, 1842 – June 9, 1842	27th		1833–1843 [data missing]
Nathan Appleton (Boston)	Whig	June 9, 1842 – September 28, 1842	27th	Elected to finish Winthrop's term. Resigned.	1833–1843 [data missing]
Vacant		September 28, 1842 – November 29, 1842	27th		1833–1843 [data missing]
Robert C. Winthrop (Boston)	Whig	November 29, 1842 – July 30, 1850	27th 28th 29th 30th 31st	Elected to finish Appleton's term. Also elected to the next term in 1842. Re-elected in 1844. Re-elected in 1846. Re-elected in 1848. Resigned to become U.S. Senator.	1833–1843 [data missing]
Robert C. Winthrop (Boston)	Whig	November 29, 1842 – July 30, 1850	27th 28th 29th 30th 31st	Elected to finish Appleton's term. Also elected to the next term in 1842. Re-elected in 1844. Re-elected in 1846. Re-elected in 1848. Resigned to become U.S. Senator.	1843–1853 "City of Boston."
Vacant		July 30, 1850 – August 22, 1850	31st		1843–1853 "City of Boston."
Samuel A. Eliot (Boston)	Whig	August 22, 1850 – March 3, 1851	31st	Elected to finish Winthrop's term. Retired.	1843–1853 "City of Boston."
William Appleton (Boston)	Whig	March 4, 1851 – March 3, 1853	32nd	Elected in 1850. Redistricted to the 5th district.	1843–1853 "City of Boston."
Zeno Scudder (Barnstable)	Whig	March 4, 1853 – March 4, 1854	33rd	Redistricted from the 10th district and re-elected in 1852. Retired because of injury.	1853–1863 [data missing]
Vacant		March 4, 1854 – April 17, 1854	33rd		1853–1863 [data missing]
Thomas D. Eliot (New Bedford)	Whig	April 17, 1854 – March 3, 1855	33rd	Elected to finish Scudder's term. Retired.	1853–1863 [data missing]
Robert B. Hall (Plymouth)	American (Know Nothing)	March 4, 1855 – March 3, 1857	34th 35th	Elected in 1854. Re-elected in 1856. [data missing]	1853–1863 [data missing]
Robert B. Hall (Plymouth)	Republican	March 4, 1857 – March 3, 1859	34th 35th	Elected in 1854. Re-elected in 1856. [data missing]	1853–1863 [data missing]
Thomas D. Eliot (New Bedford)	Republican	March 4, 1859 – March 3, 1869	36th 37th 38th 39th 40th	Elected in 1858. Re-elected in 1860. Re-elected in 1862. Re-elected in 1864. Re-elected in 1866. Retired.	1853–1863 [data missing]
Thomas D. Eliot (New Bedford)	Republican	March 4, 1859 – March 3, 1869	36th 37th 38th 39th 40th	Elected in 1858. Re-elected in 1860. Re-elected in 1862. Re-elected in 1864. Re-elected in 1866. Retired.	1863–1873 "All of Barnstable, Dukes and Nantucket counties; the city of New Bedford and towns of Dartmouth and Fairhaven, in Bristol county; the towns of Carver, Kingston, Plymouth, Plympton, Rochester, and Wareham, in Plymouth county."
James Buffinton (Fall River)	Republican	March 4, 1869 – March 7, 1875	41st 42nd 43rd 44th	Elected in 1868. Re-elected in 1870. Re-elected in 1872. Re-elected in 1874. Died.	1863–1873 "All of Barnstable, Dukes and Nantucket counties; the city of New Bedford and towns of Dartmouth and Fairhaven, in Bristol county; the towns of Carver, Kingston, Plymouth, Plympton, Rochester, and Wareham, in Plymouth county."
James Buffinton (Fall River)	Republican	March 4, 1869 – March 7, 1875	41st 42nd 43rd 44th	Elected in 1868. Re-elected in 1870. Re-elected in 1872. Re-elected in 1874. Died.	1873–1883 [data missing]
Vacant		March 7, 1875 – November 2, 1875	44th		1873–1883 [data missing]
William W. Crapo (New Bedford)	Republican	November 2, 1875 – March 3, 1883	44th 45th 46th 47th	Elected to finish Buffinton's term. Re-elected in 1876. Re-elected in 1878. Re-elected in 1880. Retired.	1873–1883 [data missing]
Robert T. Davis (Fall River)	Republican	March 4, 1883 – March 3, 1889	48th 49th 50th	Elected in 1882. Re-elected in 1884. Re-elected in 1886. Retired.	1883–1893 [data missing]
Charles S. Randall (New Bedford)	Republican	March 4, 1889 – March 3, 1893	51st 52nd	Elected in 1888. Re-elected in 1890. Redistricted to the 13th district.	1883–1893 [data missing]
Ashley B. Wright (North Adams)	Republican	March 4, 1893 – August 14, 1897	53rd 54th 55th	Elected in 1892. Re-elected in 1894. Re-elected in 1896. Died.	1893–1903 [data missing]
Vacant		August 14, 1897 – November 2, 1897	55th		1893–1903 [data missing]
George P. Lawrence (North Adams)	Republican	November 2, 1897 – March 3, 1913	55th 56th 57th 58th 59th 60th 61st 62nd	Elected to finish Wright's term. Re-elected in 1898. Re-elected in 1900. Re-elected in 1902. Re-elected in 1904. Re-elected in 1906. Re-elected in 1908. Re-elected in 1910. Retired.	1893–1903 [data missing]
George P. Lawrence (North Adams)	Republican	November 2, 1897 – March 3, 1913	55th 56th 57th 58th 59th 60th 61st 62nd	Elected to finish Wright's term. Re-elected in 1898. Re-elected in 1900. Re-elected in 1902. Re-elected in 1904. Re-elected in 1906. Re-elected in 1908. Re-elected in 1910. Retired.	1903–1913 [data missing]
Allen T. Treadway (Stockbridge)	Republican	March 4, 1913 – January 3, 1945	63rd 64th 65th 66th 67th 68th 69th 70th 71st 72nd 73rd 74th 75th 76th 77th 78th	Elected in 1912. Re-elected in 1914. Re-elected in 1916. Re-elected in 1918. Re-elected in 1920. Re-elected in 1922. Re-elected in 1924. Re-elected in 1926. Re-elected in 1928. Re-elected in 1930. Re-elected in 1932. Re-elected in 1934. Re-elected in 1936. Re-elected in 1938. Re-elected in 1940. Re-elected in 1942. Retired.	1913–1933 "Berkshire County. Franklin County: Ashfield, Buckland, Charlemont, Colrain, Conway, Greenfield, Hawley, Heath, Leyden, Monroe, Rowe, Shelburne. Hampshire County: Chesterfield, Cummington, Goshen, Huntington, Middlefield, Plainfield, Southampton, Westhampton, Worthington. Hampden County: Holyoke, Blandford, Chester, Granville, Montgomery, Russell, Southwick, Tolland, and Westfield."
Allen T. Treadway (Stockbridge)	Republican	March 4, 1913 – January 3, 1945	63rd 64th 65th 66th 67th 68th 69th 70th 71st 72nd 73rd 74th 75th 76th 77th 78th	Elected in 1912. Re-elected in 1914. Re-elected in 1916. Re-elected in 1918. Re-elected in 1920. Re-elected in 1922. Re-elected in 1924. Re-elected in 1926. Re-elected in 1928. Re-elected in 1930. Re-elected in 1932. Re-elected in 1934. Re-elected in 1936. Re-elected in 1938. Re-elected in 1940. Re-elected in 1942. Retired.	1933–1943 [data missing]
Allen T. Treadway (Stockbridge)	Republican	March 4, 1913 – January 3, 1945	63rd 64th 65th 66th 67th 68th 69th 70th 71st 72nd 73rd 74th 75th 76th 77th 78th	Elected in 1912. Re-elected in 1914. Re-elected in 1916. Re-elected in 1918. Re-elected in 1920. Re-elected in 1922. Re-elected in 1924. Re-elected in 1926. Re-elected in 1928. Re-elected in 1930. Re-elected in 1932. Re-elected in 1934. Re-elected in 1936. Re-elected in 1938. Re-elected in 1940. Re-elected in 1942. Retired.	1943–1953 [data missing]
John W. Heselton (Deerfield)	Republican	January 3, 1945 – January 3, 1959	79th 80th 81st 82nd 83rd 84th 85th	Elected in 1944. Re-elected in 1946. Re-elected in 1948. Re-elected in 1950. Re-elected in 1952. Re-elected in 1954. Re-elected in 1956. Retired.	1943–1953 [data missing]
John W. Heselton (Deerfield)	Republican	January 3, 1945 – January 3, 1959	79th 80th 81st 82nd 83rd 84th 85th	Elected in 1944. Re-elected in 1946. Re-elected in 1948. Re-elected in 1950. Re-elected in 1952. Re-elected in 1954. Re-elected in 1956. Retired.	1953–1963 "Berkshire County. Franklin County Hamdpen County: Holyoke, Westfield, Blandford, Chester, Granville, Montgomery, Russell, Southwick, and Tolland. Hampshire County: Belchertown, Chesterfield, Cummington, Goshen, Huntington, Middlefield, Pelham, Plainfield, Southampton, Westhampton, Williamsburg, Worthington. Worcester County: Athol, Petersham, Phillipston, Royalston, Templeton."
Silvio O. Conte (Pittsfield)	Republican	January 3, 1959 – February 8, 1991	86th 87th 88th 89th 90th 91st 92nd 93rd 94th 95th 96th 97th 98th 99th 100th 101st 102nd	Elected in 1958. Re-elected in 1960. Re-elected in 1962. Re-elected in 1964. Re-elected in 1966. Re-elected in 1968. Re-elected in 1970. Re-elected in 1972. Re-elected in 1974. Re-elected in 1976. Re-elected in 1978. Re-elected in 1980. Re-elected in 1982. Re-elected in 1984. Re-elected in 1986. Re-elected in 1988. Re-elected in 1990. Died.	1953–1963 "Berkshire County. Franklin County Hamdpen County: Holyoke, Westfield, Blandford, Chester, Granville, Montgomery, Russell, Southwick, and Tolland. Hampshire County: Belchertown, Chesterfield, Cummington, Goshen, Huntington, Middlefield, Pelham, Plainfield, Southampton, Westhampton, Williamsburg, Worthington. Worcester County: Athol, Petersham, Phillipston, Royalston, Templeton."
Silvio O. Conte (Pittsfield)	Republican	January 3, 1959 – February 8, 1991	86th 87th 88th 89th 90th 91st 92nd 93rd 94th 95th 96th 97th 98th 99th 100th 101st 102nd	Elected in 1958. Re-elected in 1960. Re-elected in 1962. Re-elected in 1964. Re-elected in 1966. Re-elected in 1968. Re-elected in 1970. Re-elected in 1972. Re-elected in 1974. Re-elected in 1976. Re-elected in 1978. Re-elected in 1980. Re-elected in 1982. Re-elected in 1984. Re-elected in 1986. Re-elected in 1988. Re-elected in 1990. Died.	1963–1973 "Berkshire County: North Adams, Pittsfield, Adams, Alford, Becket, Cheshire, Clarksburg, Dalton, Egremont, Florida, Great Barrington, Hancock, Hinsdale, Lanesborough, Lee, Lenox, Monterey, Mount Washington, New Ashford, New Marlborough, Otis, Peru, Richmond, Sandisfield, Savoy, Sheffield, Stockbridge, Tyringham, Washington, West Stockbridge, Williamstown, Windsor. Franklin County: Ashfield, Bernardston, Buckland, Charlemont, Colrain, Conway, Deerfield, Erving, Gill, Greenfield, Hawley, Heath, Leverett, Leyden, Monroe, Montague, New Salem, Northfield, Orange, Rowe, Shelburne, Shutesbury, Sunderland, Warwick, Wendell, Whately. Hampden County: Cities of Holyoke, Westfield, Blandford, Chester, Granville, Montgomery, Russell, Southwick, Tolland. Hampshire County: Northampton, Amherst, Chesterfield, Cummington, Easthampton, Goshen, Hadley, Hatfield, Huntington, Middlefield, Pelham, Plainfield, Southampton, Westhampton, Williamsburg, Worthington. Worcester County: Athol, Petersham, Phillipston, Royalston, Templeton." (Note: One source has a different list for the second session of the 88th Congress, which met in 1972: "Berkshire County: All cities and towns. Franklin County: All towns. Hampden County: Cities of Holyoke and Westfield. Towns of Agawam, Blandford, Chester, Granville, Montgomery, Russell, Southwick, Tolland, and West Springfield. Hampshire County: City of Northampton. Towns of Amherst, Chesterfield, Cummington, Easthampton, Goshen, Hadley, Hatfield, Huntington, Middlefield, Pelham, Plainfleld, Southampton, Westhampton, Williamsburg, and Worthington. Worcester County: Towns of Athol, Barre, Hardwick, Hubbardston, New Braintree, Oakham, Petersham, Phillipston, Royalston. Rutland, and Templeton.")
Silvio O. Conte (Pittsfield)	Republican	January 3, 1959 – February 8, 1991	86th 87th 88th 89th 90th 91st 92nd 93rd 94th 95th 96th 97th 98th 99th 100th 101st 102nd	Elected in 1958. Re-elected in 1960. Re-elected in 1962. Re-elected in 1964. Re-elected in 1966. Re-elected in 1968. Re-elected in 1970. Re-elected in 1972. Re-elected in 1974. Re-elected in 1976. Re-elected in 1978. Re-elected in 1980. Re-elected in 1982. Re-elected in 1984. Re-elected in 1986. Re-elected in 1988. Re-elected in 1990. Died.	1973–1983 "Berkshire County. Franklin County: All except Orange. Hampden County: Holyoke, Westfield, Agawam, Blandford, Chester, Granville, Montgomery, Russell, Southwick, Tolland, West Springfield. Hampshire County: Northampton and all towns."
Silvio O. Conte (Pittsfield)	Republican	January 3, 1959 – February 8, 1991	86th 87th 88th 89th 90th 91st 92nd 93rd 94th 95th 96th 97th 98th 99th 100th 101st 102nd	Elected in 1958. Re-elected in 1960. Re-elected in 1962. Re-elected in 1964. Re-elected in 1966. Re-elected in 1968. Re-elected in 1970. Re-elected in 1972. Re-elected in 1974. Re-elected in 1976. Re-elected in 1978. Re-elected in 1980. Re-elected in 1982. Re-elected in 1984. Re-elected in 1986. Re-elected in 1988. Re-elected in 1990. Died.	1983–1993 [data missing]
Vacant		February 8, 1991 – June 18, 1991	102nd		1983–1993 [data missing]
John Olver (Amherst)	Democratic	June 18, 1991 – January 3, 2013	102nd 103rd 104th 105th 106th 107th 108th 109th 110th 111th 112th	Elected to finish Conte's term. Re-elected in 1992. Re-elected in 1994. Re-elected in 1996. Re-elected in 1998. Re-elected in 2000. Re-elected in 2002. Re-elected in 2004. Re-elected in 2006. Re-elected in 2008. Re-elected in 2010. Retired.	1983–1993 [data missing]
John Olver (Amherst)	Democratic	June 18, 1991 – January 3, 2013	102nd 103rd 104th 105th 106th 107th 108th 109th 110th 111th 112th	Elected to finish Conte's term. Re-elected in 1992. Re-elected in 1994. Re-elected in 1996. Re-elected in 1998. Re-elected in 2000. Re-elected in 2002. Re-elected in 2004. Re-elected in 2006. Re-elected in 2008. Re-elected in 2010. Retired.	1993–2003 [data missing]
John Olver (Amherst)	Democratic	June 18, 1991 – January 3, 2013	102nd 103rd 104th 105th 106th 107th 108th 109th 110th 111th 112th	Elected to finish Conte's term. Re-elected in 1992. Re-elected in 1994. Re-elected in 1996. Re-elected in 1998. Re-elected in 2000. Re-elected in 2002. Re-elected in 2004. Re-elected in 2006. Re-elected in 2008. Re-elected in 2010. Retired.	2003–2013 All of Berkshire County and Franklin County as well as the following towns and cities: In Hampden County: Blandford, Chester, Granville, Holyoke, Montgomery, Russell, Southwick, Tolland, Westfield, West Springfield. In Hampshire County: Amherst, Belchertown, Chesterfield, Cummington, Easthampton, Goshen, Granby, Hatfield, Huntington, Middlefield, Pelham, Plainfield, Southampton, Ware, Westhampton, Williamsburg, Worthington. In Middlesex County: Ashby, Pepperell, Townsend. In Worcester County: Ashburnham, Athol, Barre, Fitchburg, Gardner, Hardwick, Hubbardston, Leominster, Lunenburg, New Braintree, Oakham, Petersham, Phillipston, Royalston, Sterling, Templeton, West Brookfield, Westminster, Winchendon.
Richard Neal (Springfield)	Democratic	January 3, 2013 – present	113th 114th 115th 116th 117th 118th 119th	Redistricted from the 2nd district and re-elected in 2012. Re-elected in 2014. Re-elected in 2016. Re-elected in 2018. Re-elected in 2020. Re-elected in 2022. Re-elected in 2024. Re-elected in 2026.	2013–2023 Berkshire County. Hampden County All except Precinct 1A in Palmer. In western Franklin County: Ashfield, Bernardston, Buckland, Charlemont, Colrain, Conway, Hawley, Heath, Leyden, Monroe, Rowe, Shelburne. In western Hampshire County: Chesterfield, Cummington, Easthampton, Goshen, Granby, Huntington, Middlefield, Plainfield, South Hadley, Southampton, Westhampton, Williamsburg, Worthington. In southwestern Worcester County: Brookfield, Charlton, Dudley, East Brookfield, Southbridge, Sturbridge, Warren.
Richard Neal (Springfield)	Democratic	January 3, 2013 – present	113th 114th 115th 116th 117th 118th 119th	Redistricted from the 2nd district and re-elected in 2012. Re-elected in 2014. Re-elected in 2016. Re-elected in 2018. Re-elected in 2020. Re-elected in 2022. Re-elected in 2024. Re-elected in 2026.	2023–present

== Recent election results ==
=== 2002 ===
2002 general election
Party	Candidate	Votes	%
Democratic	John Olver (incumbent)	137,841	67.56
Republican	Matthew Kinnaman	66,061	32.40
Write-in		117	0.06
Majority		71,780	35.18
Turnout		204,019	
Democratic hold			

=== 2004 ===
2004 general election
Party	Candidate	Votes	%	±%
Democratic	John Olver (incumbent)	229,465	99.02	+ 31.46
Write-in		2,282	0.98	+ 0.92
Majority		227,183	98.04	+ 62.86
Turnout		231,747		
Democratic hold		Swing		

=== 2006 ===
2006 general election
Party	Candidate	Votes	%
Democratic	John Olver (incumbent)	158,035	76%
Unenrolled challenger	William H. Szych	49,123	24%
Socialist	Eric Chester	<253	<1%
Democratic hold			

=== 2008 ===
2008 general election
Party	Candidate	Votes	%
Democratic	John Olver (incumbent)	215,696	69.7%
Republican	Nathan Bech	80,067	25.9%
Democratic hold			

=== 2010 ===
2010 general election
Party	Candidate	Votes	%
Democratic	John Olver (incumbent)	128,011	60%
Republican	William L. Gunn Jr.	74,418	34.9%
Independent	Michael Engel	10,880	5.1%
Democratic hold			

=== 2012 ===
2012 Democratic primary
Party	Candidate	Votes	%
Democratic	Richard Neal (redistricted incumbent)	40,295	65.4
Democratic	Andrea F. Nuciforo Jr.	15,159	24.63
Democratic	Bill Shein	6,059	9.85
Write-in	Other	0.05	0.1
Total votes		61,546	100

2012 general election
Party	Candidate	Votes	%
Democratic	Richard E. Neal (redistricted incumbent)	261,936	98.42
Write-in	Other	4,197	1.58
Total votes		266,133	100

=== 2014 ===
2014 Democratic primary
Party	Candidate	Votes	%
Democratic	Richard Neal (Incumbent)	44,857	98.45
Write-in	Other	706	1.55
Total votes		45,563	100

2014 general election
Party	Candidate	Votes	%
Democratic	Richard E. Neal (Incumbent)	167,612	97.97
Write-in	Other	3,498	2.04
Total votes		171,110	100

=== 2016 ===
2016 Democratic primary
Party	Candidate	Votes	%
Democratic	Richard Neal (Incumbent)	44,857	98.45
Write-in	Other	706	1.55
Total votes		45,563	100

2016 general election
Party	Candidate	Votes	%
Democratic	Richard E. Neal (Incumbent)	235,803	73.34
Independent	Frederick O. Mayock	57,504	17.88
Libertarian	Thomas T. Simmons	27,511	8.56
Write-in	Other	721	0.22
Total votes		321,539	100

=== 2018 ===
2018 Democratic primary
Party	Candidate	Votes	%
Democratic	Richard Neal (Incumbent)	49,696	70.64
Democratic	Tahirah Amatul-Wadud	20,565	29.23
Write-in	Other	93	0.13
Total votes		70,354	100

2018 general election
Party	Candidate	Votes	%
Democratic	Richard E. Neal (Incumbent)	211,790	97.64
Write-in	Other	5,110	2.36
Total votes		216,900	100

=== 2020 ===
2020 Democratic primary
Party	Candidate	Votes	%
Democratic	Richard Neal (Incumbent)	83,437	58.8
Democratic	Alex Morse	58,390	41.2
Write-in	Other		
Total votes			

2020 general election
Party	Candidate	Votes	%
Democratic	Richard Neal (Incumbent)	275,376	96.5%
Write-in	Other	9,956	3.5%
Total votes			

=== 2022 ===
2022 general election
Party	Candidate	Votes	%
Democratic	Richard Neal (incumbent)	157,635	61.5%
Republican	Dean Martilli	98,386	38.4%
Write-in		378	0.1%
Total votes		263,651	100%

=== 2024 ===
2024 general election
Party	Candidate	Votes	%
Democratic	Richard Neal (incumbent)	223,325	62.4
Independent	Nadia Milleron	133,552	37.3
Write-in		1,181	0.3
Total votes		358,058	100.0

=== 2026 ===
2026 Democratic primary
Party	Candidate	Votes	%
Democratic	Richard Neal (incumbent)		54.1
Democratic	Jeromie Whalen		45.9
Write-in			
Total votes			98.3

== See also ==
- Massachusetts's congressional districts
- List of United States congressional districts
