= 2008 United States Senate election in Massachusetts =

- November 4, 2008
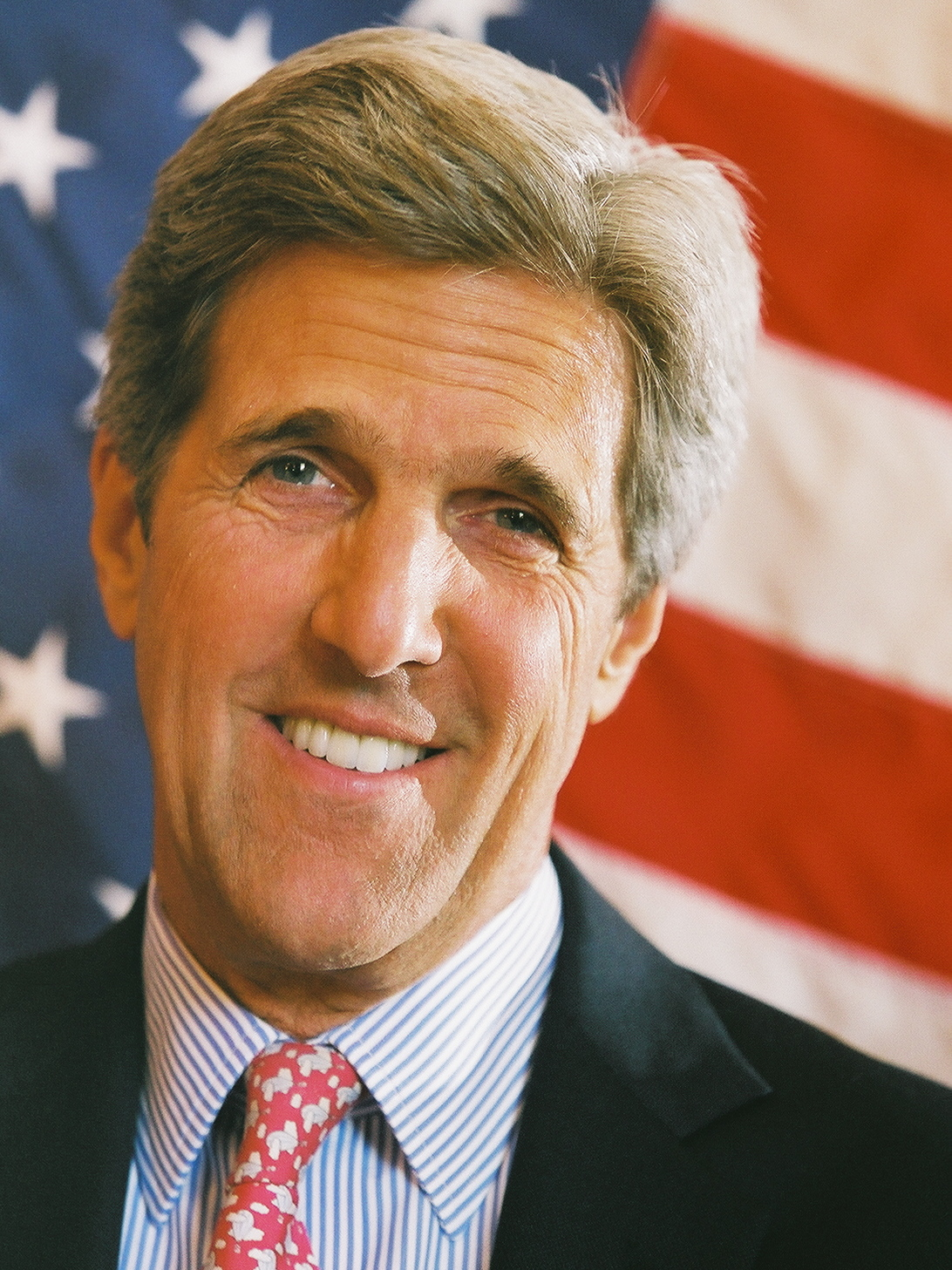

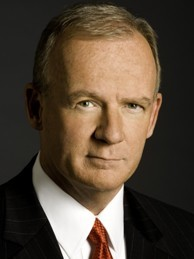
Nominee	John Kerry	Jeff Beatty
Party	Democratic	Republican
Popular vote	1,971,974	926,044
Percentage	65.86%	30.93%
- Kerry: 40–50% 50–60% 60–70% 70–80% 80–90% >90% Beatty: 40–50% 50–60% No votes
U.S. senator before election
John Kerry
Democratic
Elected U.S. Senator
John Kerry
Democratic

The 2008 United States Senate election in Massachusetts took place on November 4, 2008. Incumbent Democratic U.S. Senator John Kerry, who remained in the Senate after losing the presidency to incumbent President George W. Bush in the 2004 presidential election, won re-election to a fifth term in office. Kerry carried every county, congressional district, and municipality in the state, with the exception of Boxford. Kerry was sworn in for what would be his last term in the senate serving from January 3, 2009, to February 1, 2013, when he assumed the office of United States Secretary of State in the Obama administration.

Kerry carried all 14 counties and 350 of 351 municipalities in Massachusetts. The only town won by Beatty was Boxford.

== Democratic primary ==
=== Candidates ===
- John Kerry, incumbent U.S. Senator
- Edward O'Reilly, Gloucester city councilor

=== Campaign ===
At the state convention on June 7, 2008, Edward O'Reilly received 22.5% of the vote, thereby granting him a spot on the September primary ballot. Kerry received the vast majority of votes, however, granting him the convention's endorsement. On July 25, O'Reilly challenged Kerry to a series of debates, and the two eventually met for one debate in early September. On September 16, Kerry defeated O'Reilly in the Democratic primary.

=== Results ===
Primary results by municipality

2008 United States Senate Democratic primary in Massachusetts
Party	Candidate	Votes	%	±%
Democratic	John Kerry (incumbent)	335,923	68.92%	
Democratic	Edward O'Reilly	151,473	31.08%	
Turnout		487,396		

== General election ==
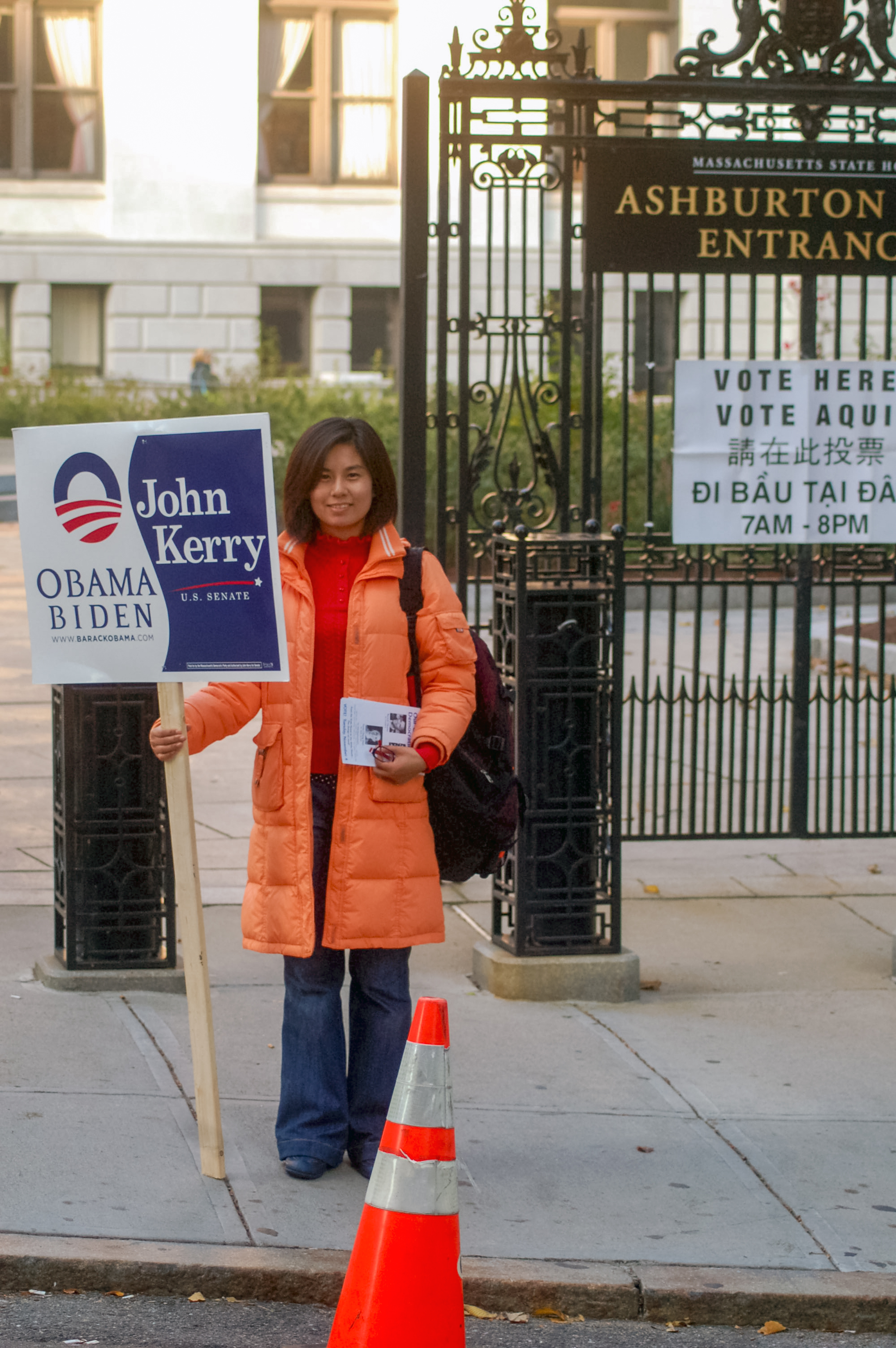
A volunteer outside the Massachusetts State House holding a sign supporting both Kerry's Senate campaign and Obama's presidential campaign, 29 October 2008

=== Candidates ===
- Jeff Beatty (R), military officer, businessman and nominee for MA-10 in 2006
- John Kerry (D), incumbent U.S. Senator
- Robert Underwood (L)

=== Campaign ===
Democrat John F. Kerry, the incumbent since 1985, was the unsuccessful Democratic candidate for President of the United States in the 2004 election. He had historically attracted strong Republican challengers, including two former Massachusetts Republican Party Chairman, Ray Shamie in 1984, Jim Rappaport in 1990, and former state Governor William Weld in 1996.

Kerry had explored the possibility of seeking the Democratic nomination for president once again in 2008, a circumstance which prompted many of Massachusetts's all-Democratic House delegation, including Marty Meehan, Ed Markey and Stephen Lynch, to declare that they would run in the Democratic primary for Senate should Kerry not seek re-election. However, on January 24, 2007, Kerry announced that he would run for re-election to the United States Senate and not for the Presidency. A December 23, 2007, poll indicated his approval rating at 52%, with 43% disapproving.

Massachusetts held primary elections on September 16, 2008. Unlike in 2002, when Kerry was re-elected against only third-party opposition, the Democratic nominee faced a Republican opponent in 2008. The Republican candidate, former U.S. Army Delta Force officer and FBI special agent Jeff Beatty who had lost a congressional race two years earlier, was not considered a serious contender in this overwhelmingly Democratic state. Massachusetts had not elected a Republican Senator since Edward Brooke in 1972, although Republican Scott Brown would go on to win a special Senate election in 2010.

On September 16, 2008, Kerry defeated Edward O'Reilly in the Democratic primary and faced Republican Beatty in the November general election.

=== Predictions ===
Source	Ranking	As of
The Cook Political Report	Safe D	October 23, 2008
CQ Politics	Safe D	October 31, 2008
Rothenberg Political Report	Safe D	November 2, 2008
Real Clear Politics	Safe D	November 4, 2008

=== Polling ===
Source	Date	Jeff Beatty (R)	John Kerry (D)
Rasmussen Reports	April 25, 2008	30%	55%
Rasmussen Reports	June 1, 2008	25%	63%
Rasmussen Reports	August 5, 2008	32%	59%
Rasmussen Reports	September 23, 2008	30%	65%

=== Results ===
General election results
Party	Candidate	Votes	%	±%
Democratic	John Kerry (incumbent)	1,971,974	65.86%	−14.2%
Republican	Jeff Beatty	926,044	30.93%	+30.93%
Libertarian	Robert J. Underwood	93,713	3.13%	−15.1%
Majority		1,037,116	34.64%	−26.96%
Turnout		2,994,247		
Democratic hold				

==== By county ====
By county

County	John Kerry Democratic		Jeffrey Beatty Republican		All others	
County	#	%	#	%	#	%
Barnstable	71,509	55.0%	55,673	42.8%	2,799	2.1%
Berkshire	50,364	77.9%	11,863	18.3%	2,455	3.8%
Bristol	158,827	67.4%	68,449	29.0%	8,471	3.6%
Dukes	7,491	72.7%	2,501	24.3%	318	3.0%
Essex	218,583	63.5%	115,312	33.5%	10,220	3.0%
Franklin	27,944	73.8%	8,079	21.3%	1,830	4.9%
Hampden	125,283	65.5%	56,212	29.4%	9,669	5.1%
Hampshire	57,053	73.4%	17,221	22.1%	3,489	4.5%
Middlesex	476,434	67.3%	209,940	29.7%	21,246	3.0%
Nantucket	3,991	67.5%	1,717	29,0%	208	3.5%
Norfolk	214,071	63.8%	112,229	33.5%	9,057	2.7%
Plymouth	142,223	58.4%	94,567	38.8%	6,926	2.8%
Suffolk	204,753	80.0%	44,308	17.3%	6,752	2.6%
Worcester	213,448	60.3%	127,973	36.1%	12,789	3.6%
Totals	1,971,974	65.9%	926,044	30.9%	96,229	3.2%

== See also ==
- 2008 United States Senate elections
