= 2022 United States House of Representatives elections in Massachusetts =

- November 8, 2022

All 9 Massachusetts seats to the United States House of Representatives
	Majority party	Minority party
Party	Democratic	Republican
Last election	9	0
Seats won	9	0
Seat change	Steady	Steady
Popular vote	1,636,400	706,790
Percentage	69.40%	29.97%
Swing	▼5.23%	▲8.96%

Democratic
50–60%
60–70%
70–80%
80–90%
90–100%
Republican
50–60%
Tie
50%

The 2022 United States House of Representatives elections in Massachusetts were held on November 8, 2022, to elect the nine U.S. representatives from the state of Massachusetts, one from each of the state's nine congressional districts. The elections coincided with other elections to the House of Representatives, elections to the United States Senate and various state and local elections. Two Republican primaries (in the 8th and 9th districts) were held on September 6. No other candidate faced a competitive primary. Massachusetts is the most populous state in which only a single party won seats in 2022.

== District 1 ==
2022 Massachusetts's 1st congressional district election
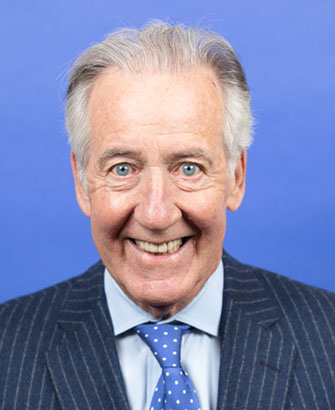

Nominee	Richard Neal	Dean Martilli
Party	Democratic	Republican
Popular vote	157,635	98,386
Percentage	61.5%	38.4%
- Municipality results Neal: 40–50% 50–60% 60–70% 70–80% 80–90% Martilli: 50–60%
U.S. Representative before election
Richard Neal
Democratic
Elected U.S. Representative
Richard Neal
Democratic

The 1st district is based in the western and central parts of the state, and includes the city of Springfield. The incumbent was Democrat Richard Neal, who was reelected with 96.5% of the vote in 2020 without major-party opposition.

=== Democratic primary ===
==== Nominee ====
- Richard Neal, incumbent U.S. Representative

==== Endorsements ====
Richard Neal

Organizations

- Planned Parenthood Action Fund

==== Results ====
Democratic primary results
Party	Candidate	Votes	%
Democratic	Richard Neal (incumbent)	71,928	99.2
Write-in		606	0.8
Total votes		72,534	100.0

=== Republican primary ===
==== Nominee ====
- Dean Martilli, business consultant and former chief of staff to Patrick Kennedy

==== Endorsements ====
Dean Martilli

Former Elected Officials

- Geoff Diehl, State Representative (2011–2019)

==== Results ====
Republican primary results
Party	Candidate	Votes	%
Republican	Dean Martilli	23,256	99.2
Write-in		194	0.8
Total votes		23,450	100.0

=== General election ===
==== Predictions ====
Source	Ranking	As of
The Cook Political Report	Solid D	November 23, 2021
Inside Elections	Solid D	April 14, 2022
Sabato's Crystal Ball	Safe D	December 2, 2021
Politico	Solid D	April 5, 2022
RCP	Safe D	June 9, 2022
Fox News	Solid D	July 11, 2022
DDHQ	Solid D	July 20, 2022
538	Solid D	June 30, 2022
The Economist	Safe D	September 28, 2022

==== Results ====
2022 Massachusetts's 1st congressional district election
Party	Candidate	Votes	%
Democratic	Richard Neal (incumbent)	157,635	61.5
Republican	Dean Martilli	98,386	38.4
Write-in		378	0.1
Total votes		256,399	100.0
Democratic hold			

== District 2 ==
2022 Massachusetts's 2nd congressional district election
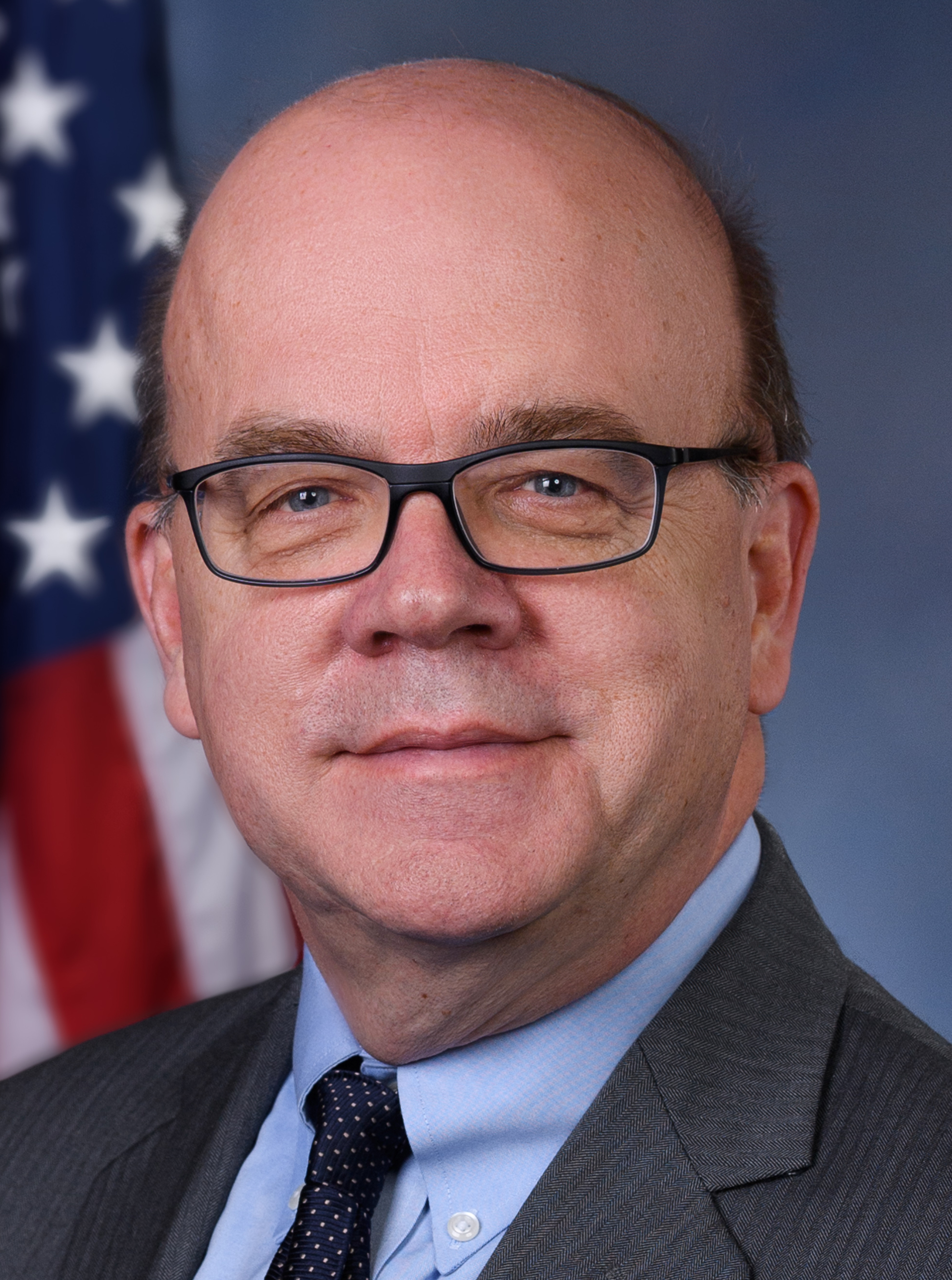

Nominee	Jim McGovern	Jeffrey Sossa-Paquette
Party	Democratic	Republican
Popular vote	180,639	91,956
Percentage	66.2%	33.7%
- Municipality results McGovern: 50–60% 60–70% 70–80% 80–90% >90% Sossa-Paquette: 50–60%
U.S. Representative before election
Jim McGovern
Democratic
Elected U.S. Representative
Jim McGovern
Democratic

The 2nd congressional district is in central Massachusetts and includes Worcester. The incumbent was Democrat Jim McGovern, who was reelected with 65.3% of the vote in 2020.

=== Democratic primary ===
==== Nominee ====
- Jim McGovern, incumbent U.S. Representative

==== Endorsements ====
Jim McGovern

U.S. Representatives

- Ayanna Pressley, U.S. Representative from Massachusetts's 7th congressional district (2019–)

Organizations

- Feminist Majority PAC
- Planned Parenthood Action Fund
- Progressive Democrats of America
- Sierra Club

==== Results ====
Democratic primary results
Party	Candidate	Votes	%
Democratic	Jim McGovern (incumbent)	69,839	99.7
Write-in		216	0.3
Total votes		70,055	100.0

=== Republican primary ===
==== Nominee ====
- Jeffrey Sossa-Paquette, child care center owner

==== Endorsements ====
Jeffrey Sossa-Paquette

Organizations

- Log Cabin Republicans

==== Results ====
Republican primary results
Party	Candidate	Votes	%
Republican	Jeffrey Sossa-Paquette	22,675	99.4
Write-in		140	0.6
Total votes		22,815	100.0

=== General election ===
==== Predictions ====
Source	Ranking	As of
The Cook Political Report	Solid D	November 23, 2021
Inside Elections	Solid D	April 14, 2022
Sabato's Crystal Ball	Safe D	December 2, 2021
Politico	Solid D	April 5, 2022
RCP	Safe D	June 9, 2022
Fox News	Solid D	July 11, 2022
DDHQ	Solid D	July 20, 2022
538	Solid D	June 30, 2022
The Economist	Safe D	September 28, 2022

==== Results ====
2022 Massachusetts's 2nd congressional district election
Party	Candidate	Votes	%
Democratic	Jim McGovern (incumbent)	180,639	66.2
Republican	Jeffrey Sossa-Paquette	91,956	33.7
Write-in		276	0.1
Total votes		272,871	100.0
Democratic hold			

== District 3 ==
2022 Massachusetts's 3rd congressional district election
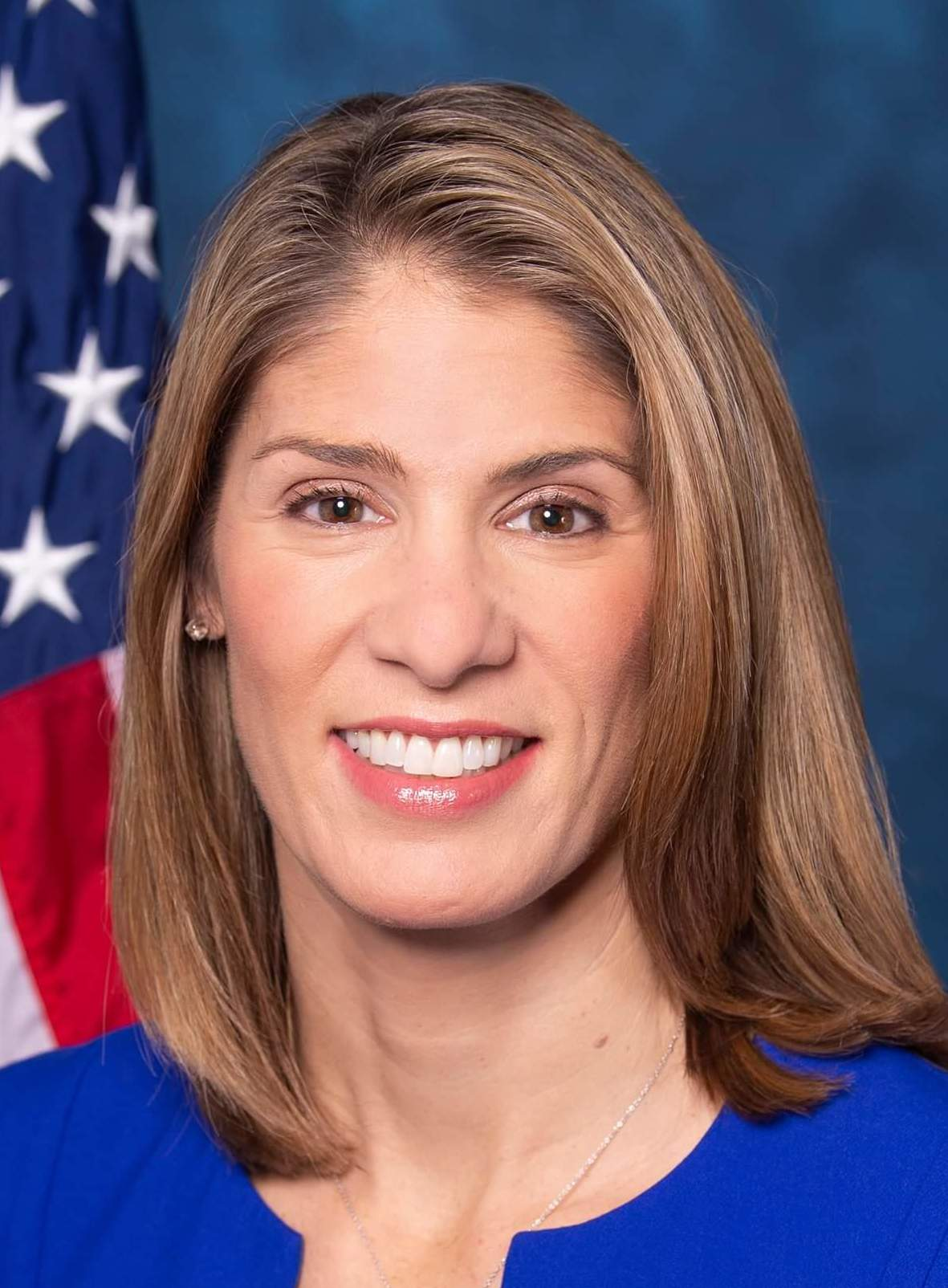

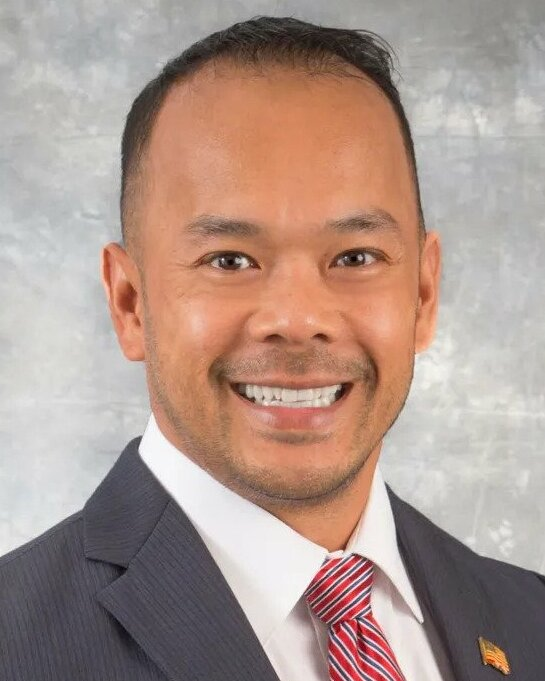
Nominee	Lori Trahan	Dean Tran
Party	Democratic	Republican
Popular vote	154,496	88,585
Percentage	63.5%	36.4%
- Municipality results Trahan: 50–60% 60–70% 70–80% 80–90% Tran: 50–60%
U.S. Representative before election
Lori Trahan
Democratic
Elected U.S. Representative
Lori Trahan
Democratic

The 3rd district is based in northeastern and central Massachusetts, and includes the cities of Lowell, Lawrence, and Haverhill. The incumbent was Democrat Lori Trahan, who was elected with 97.7% of the vote in 2020 without major-party opposition.

=== Democratic primary ===
==== Nominee ====
- Lori Trahan, incumbent U.S. Representative

==== Failed to qualify ====
- Miranda Tozier-Robbins, small business owner

==== Endorsements ====
Lori Trahan

State officials

- Paul DePalo, member of the Massachusetts Governor's Council from the 7th district

State legislators

- Harriette L. Chandler, state senator from the 1st Worcester district
- John Cronin, state senator from the Worcester and Middlesex district
- Anne Gobi, state senator from the Worcester, Hampden, Hampshire and Middlesex district
- Meghan Kilcoyne, state representative from the 12th Worcester district
- Mike Kushmerek, state representative from the 3rd Worcester district
- Susannah Whipps, state representative from the 2nd Franklin district (Independent)
- Jonathan Zlotnik, state representative from the 2nd Worcester district

Mayors

- Stephen DiNatale, mayor of Fitchburg

Organizations

- Giffords
- NARAL Pro-Choice America
- Planned Parenthood Action Fund

==== Results ====
Democratic primary results
Party	Candidate	Votes	%
Democratic	Lori Trahan (incumbent)	64,190	99.6
Write-in		283	0.4
Total votes		64,473	100.0

=== Republican primary ===
==== Nominee ====
- Dean Tran, former state senator (2017–2021)

==== Results ====
Republican primary results
Party	Candidate	Votes	%
Republican	Dean Tran	24,087	99.3
Write-in		180	0.7
Total votes		24,267	100.0

=== General election ===
==== Predictions ====
Source	Ranking	As of
The Cook Political Report	Solid D	November 23, 2021
Inside Elections	Solid D	April 14, 2022
Sabato's Crystal Ball	Safe D	December 2, 2021
Politico	Solid D	April 5, 2022
RCP	Safe D	June 9, 2022
Fox News	Solid D	July 11, 2022
DDHQ	Solid D	July 20, 2022
538	Solid D	June 30, 2022
The Economist	Safe D	September 28, 2022

==== Results ====
2022 Massachusetts's 3rd congressional district election
Party	Candidate	Votes	%
Democratic	Lori Trahan (incumbent)	154,496	63.5
Republican	Dean Tran	88,585	36.4
Write-in		220	0.1
Total votes		243,301	100.0
Democratic hold			

== District 4 ==
2022 Massachusetts's 4th congressional district election
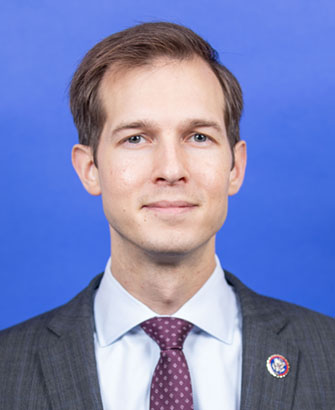
Nominee	Jake Auchincloss
Party	Democratic
Popular vote	201,882
Percentage	96.9%
- Municipality results Auchincloss: >90%
U.S. Representative before election
Jake Auchincloss
Democratic
Elected U.S. Representative
Jake Auchincloss
Democratic

The 4th congressional district is mostly in southern Massachusetts and includes Brookline, the southwestern suburbs of Boston, and northern Bristol County. The incumbent was Democrat Jake Auchincloss, who was elected with 60.8% of the vote in 2020.

=== Democratic primary ===
==== Nominee ====
- Jake Auchincloss, incumbent U.S. Representative

==== Declined ====
- Sam Hyun, chair of the Commonwealth of Massachusetts Asian American and Pacific Islander Commission
- Jesse Mermell, former Brookline select boardmember, former aide to former governor Deval Patrick, and candidate for this district in 2020

==== Endorsements ====
Jake Auchincloss

State legislators

- Michael Brady, state senator
- Ed Coppinger, state representative
- Carol Doherty, state representative
- Carolyn Dykema, state representative
- Paul Feeney, state senator
- Carole Fiola, state representative
- Denise Garlick, state representative
- Patricia Haddad, state representative
- David Linsky, state representative
- Brian Murray, state representative
- Marc Pacheco, state senator
- Alice Peisch, state representative
- Michael Rodrigues, state senator
- Jeffrey Roy, state representative
- Mike Rush, state senator
- Adam Scanlon, state representative
- Paul Schmid, state representative
- Karen Spilka, president of the Massachusetts Senate
- Tommy Vitolo, state representative

Organizations

- Democratic Majority for Israel
- New Politics
- Planned Parenthood Action Fund
- Pro-Israel America
- Serve America

==== Results ====
Democratic primary results
Party	Candidate	Votes	%
Democratic	Jake Auchincloss (incumbent)	67,738	99.3
Write-in		481	0.7
Total votes		68,219	100.0

=== Republican primary ===
==== Eliminated in primary ====
- David Cannata, construction safety instructor (write-in)

==== Results ====
Republican primary results
Party	Candidate	Votes	%
Republican	Other Write-ins	1,457	57.2
Republican	David Cannata	1,091	42.8
Total votes		2,548	100.0

=== General election ===
==== Predictions ====
Source	Ranking	As of
The Cook Political Report	Solid D	November 23, 2021
Inside Elections	Solid D	April 14, 2022
Sabato's Crystal Ball	Safe D	December 2, 2021
Politico	Solid D	April 5, 2022
RCP	Safe D	June 9, 2022
Fox News	Solid D	July 11, 2022
DDHQ	Solid D	July 20, 2022
538	Solid D	June 30, 2022
The Economist	Safe D	September 28, 2022

==== Results ====
2022 Massachusetts's 4th congressional district election
Party	Candidate	Votes	%
Democratic	Jake Auchincloss (incumbent)	201,882	96.9
Write-in		6,397	3.1
Total votes		208,279	100.0
Democratic hold			

== District 5 ==
2022 Massachusetts's 5th congressional district election
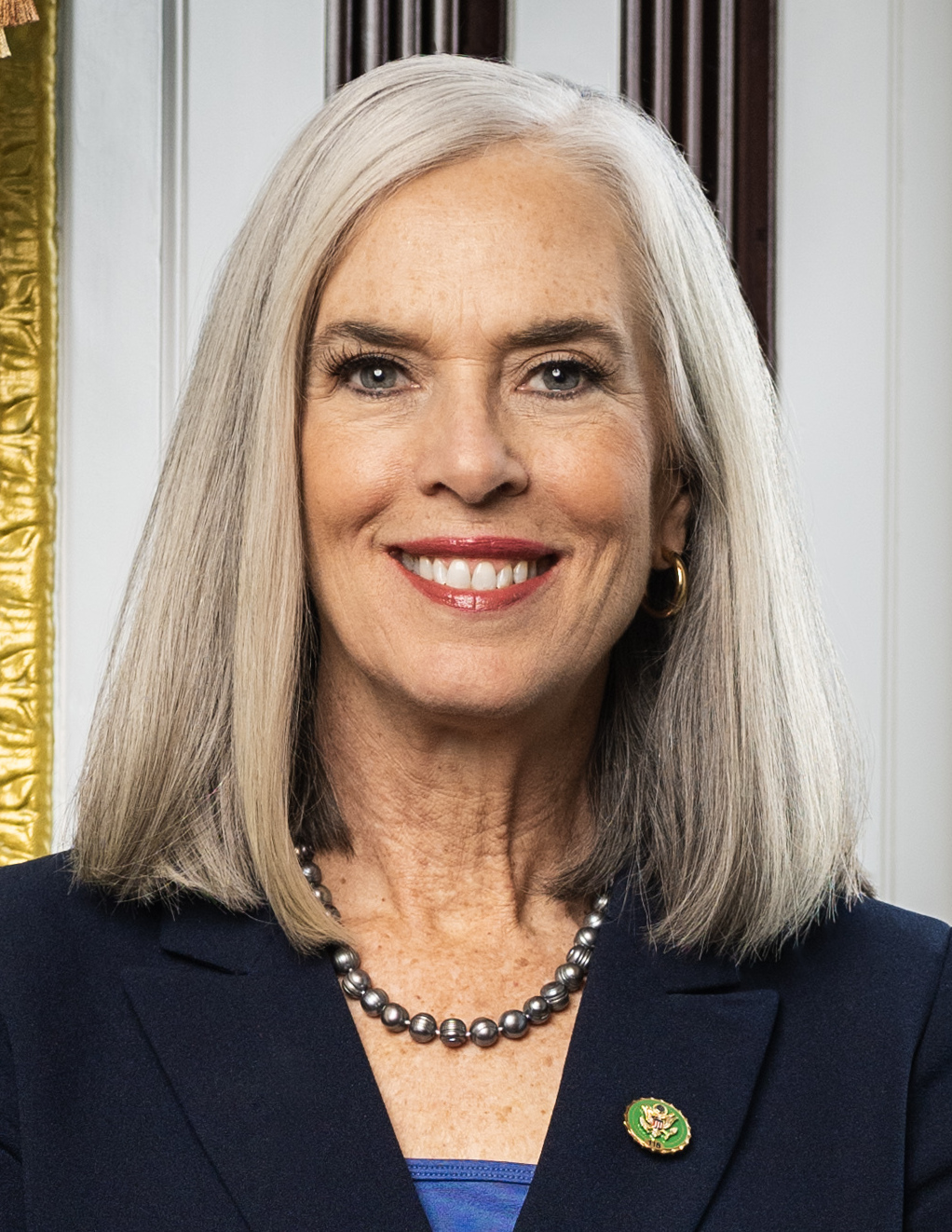

Nominee	Katherine Clark	Caroline Colarusso
Party	Democratic	Republican
Popular vote	203,994	71,491
Percentage	74.0%	25.9%
- Municipality results Clark: 50–60% 60–70% 70–80% 80–90% >90%
U.S. Representative before election
Katherine Clark
Democratic
Elected U.S. Representative
Katherine Clark
Democratic

The 5th congressional district contains Boston's northern and western suburbs, including Malden and Framingham. The incumbent was Democrat Katherine Clark, who was reelected with 74.3% of the vote in 2020.

=== Democratic primary ===
==== Nominee ====
- Katherine Clark, incumbent U.S. Representative and Assistant Speaker of the House

==== Endorsements ====
Katherine Clark

U.S. Representatives

- Ayanna Pressley, U.S. Representative from Massachusetts's 7th congressional district (2019–)

Organizations

- End Citizens United
- Feminist Majority PAC
- League of Conservation Voters
- NARAL Pro-Choice America
- Planned Parenthood Action Fund
- Sierra Club

==== Results ====
Democratic primary results
Party	Candidate	Votes	%
Democratic	Katherine Clark (incumbent)	84,845	99.6
Write-in		329	0.4
Total votes		85,174	100.0

=== Republican primary ===
==== Nomine ====
- Caroline Colarusso, ice hockey coach, former Stoneham selectwoman, and nominee for this district in 2020

==== Failed to qualify ====
- Norman Schwartz

==== Results ====
Republican primary results
Party	Candidate	Votes	%
Republican	Caroline Colarusso	16,184	99.0
Write-in		161	1.0
Total votes		16,345	100.0

=== General election ===
==== Predictions ====
Source	Ranking	As of
The Cook Political Report	Solid D	November 23, 2021
Inside Elections	Solid D	April 14, 2022
Sabato's Crystal Ball	Safe D	December 2, 2021
Politico	Solid D	April 5, 2022
RCP	Safe D	June 9, 2022
Fox News	Solid D	July 11, 2022
DDHQ	Solid D	July 20, 2022
538	Solid D	June 30, 2022
The Economist	Safe D	September 28, 2022

==== Results ====
2022 Massachusetts's 5th congressional district election
Party	Candidate	Votes	%
Democratic	Katherine Clark (incumbent)	203,994	74.0
Republican	Caroline Colarusso	71,491	25.9
Write-in		186	0.1
Total votes		275,671	100.0
Democratic hold			

== District 6 ==
2022 Massachusetts's 6th congressional district election
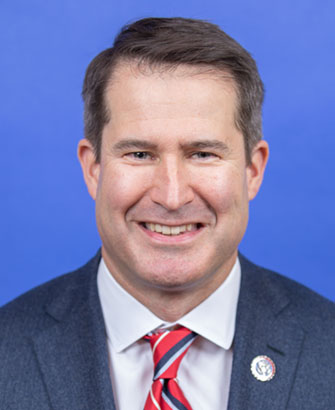

Nominee	Seth Moulton	Robert May
Party	Democratic	Republican
Popular vote	198,119	110,770
Percentage	62.9%	35.1%
- Municipality results Moulton: 40–50% 50–60% 60–70% 70–80% May: 50–60%
U.S. Representative before election
Seth Moulton
Democratic
Elected U.S. Representative
Seth Moulton
Democratic

The 6th district is based in northeastern Massachusetts, and contains most of Essex County, including the North Shore and Cape Ann. The incumbent was Democrat Seth Moulton, who was reelected with 65.4% of the vote in 2020.

=== Democratic primary ===
==== Nominee ====
- Seth Moulton, incumbent U.S. Representative

==== Endorsements ====
Seth Moulton

Organizations

- Alliance for Retired Americans
- Association of Flight Attendants
- Brady Campaign
- Common Defense
- Democratic Majority for Israel
- Free Syria PAC
- Giffords; Courage to Fight Gun Violence
- Human Rights Campaign
- J Street
- League of Conservation Voters
- Massachusetts AFL-CIO
- NARAL Pro-Choice America
- National Iranian American Council
- New Politics
- Newton Action Alliance
- Planned Parenthood Action Fund
- Progressive Turnout Project
- VoteVets
- Veterans for Responsible Leadership
- Young Democrats of Massachusetts

==== Results ====
Democratic primary results
Party	Candidate	Votes	%
Democratic	Seth Moulton (incumbent)	84,860	99.3
Write-in		597	0.7
Total votes		85,457	100.0

=== Republican primary ===
==== Nominee ====
- Robert May, mechanical engineer, business consultant, and candidate for state representative in 2020

==== Results ====
Republican primary results
Party	Candidate	Votes	%
Republican	Robert May	29,503	99.2
Write-in		240	0.8
Total votes		29,743	100.0

=== Independents and third parties ===
==== Candidates ====
- Mark Tashjian (Libertarian), entrepreneur

=== General election ===
==== Predictions ====
Source	Ranking	As of
The Cook Political Report	Solid D	November 23, 2021
Inside Elections	Solid D	April 14, 2022
Sabato's Crystal Ball	Safe D	December 2, 2021
Politico	Solid D	April 5, 2022
RCP	Safe D	June 9, 2022
Fox News	Solid D	July 11, 2022
DDHQ	Solid D	July 20, 2022
538	Solid D	June 30, 2022
The Economist	Safe D	September 28, 2022

==== Results ====
2022 Massachusetts's 6th congressional district election
Party	Candidate	Votes	%
Democratic	Seth Moulton (incumbent)	198,119	62.9
Republican	Robert May	110,770	35.1
Libertarian	Mark Tashjian	5,995	1.9
Write-in		197	0.1
Total votes		315,081	100.0
Democratic hold			

== District 7 ==
2022 Massachusetts's 7th congressional district election
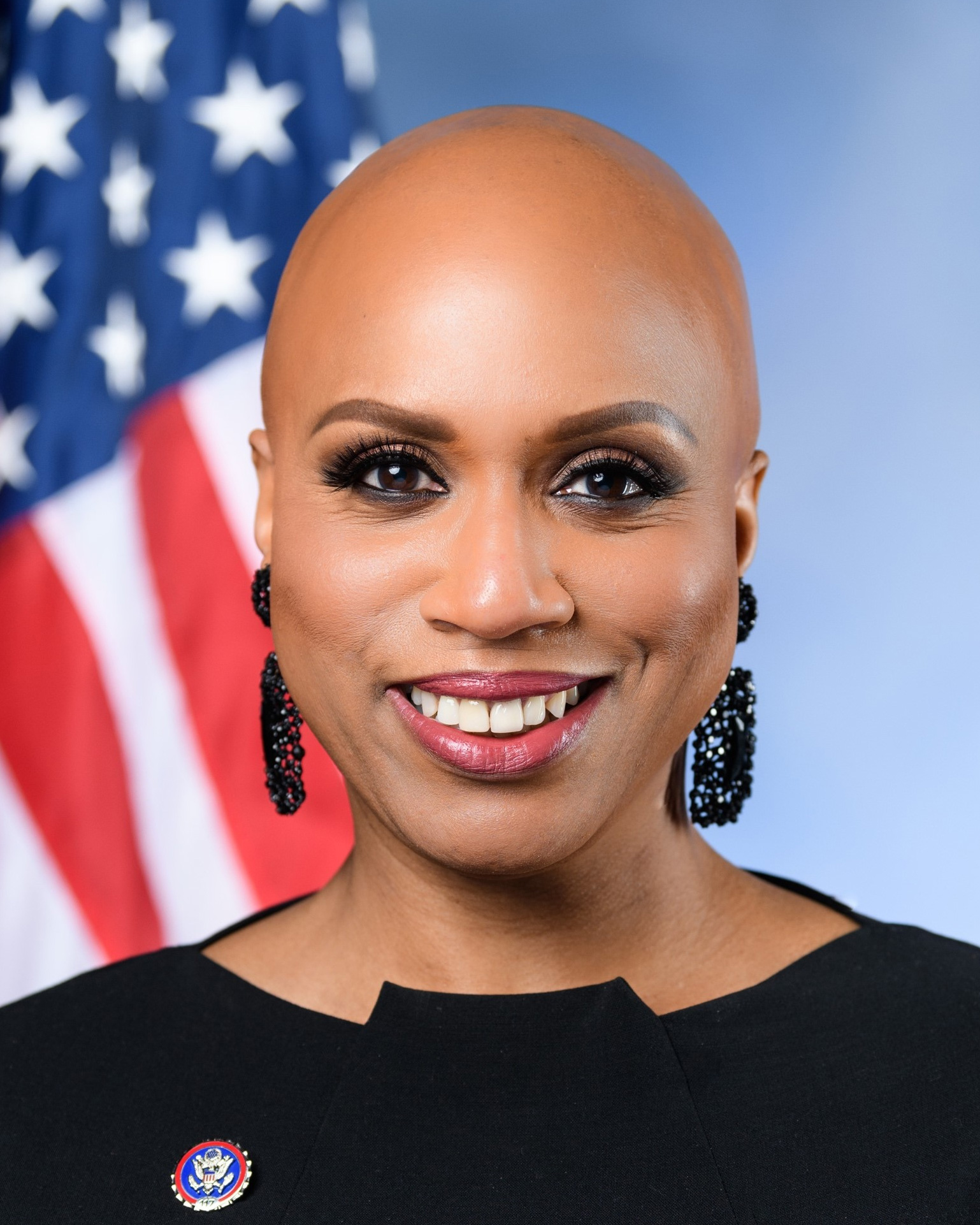

Nominee	Ayanna Pressley	Donnie Palmer
Party	Democratic	Republican
Popular vote	151,825	27,129
Percentage	84.6%	15.1%
- Pressley 50–60% 60–70% 70–80% 80–90% >90%
U.S. Representative before election
Ayanna Pressley
Democratic
Elected U.S. Representative
Ayanna Pressley
Democratic

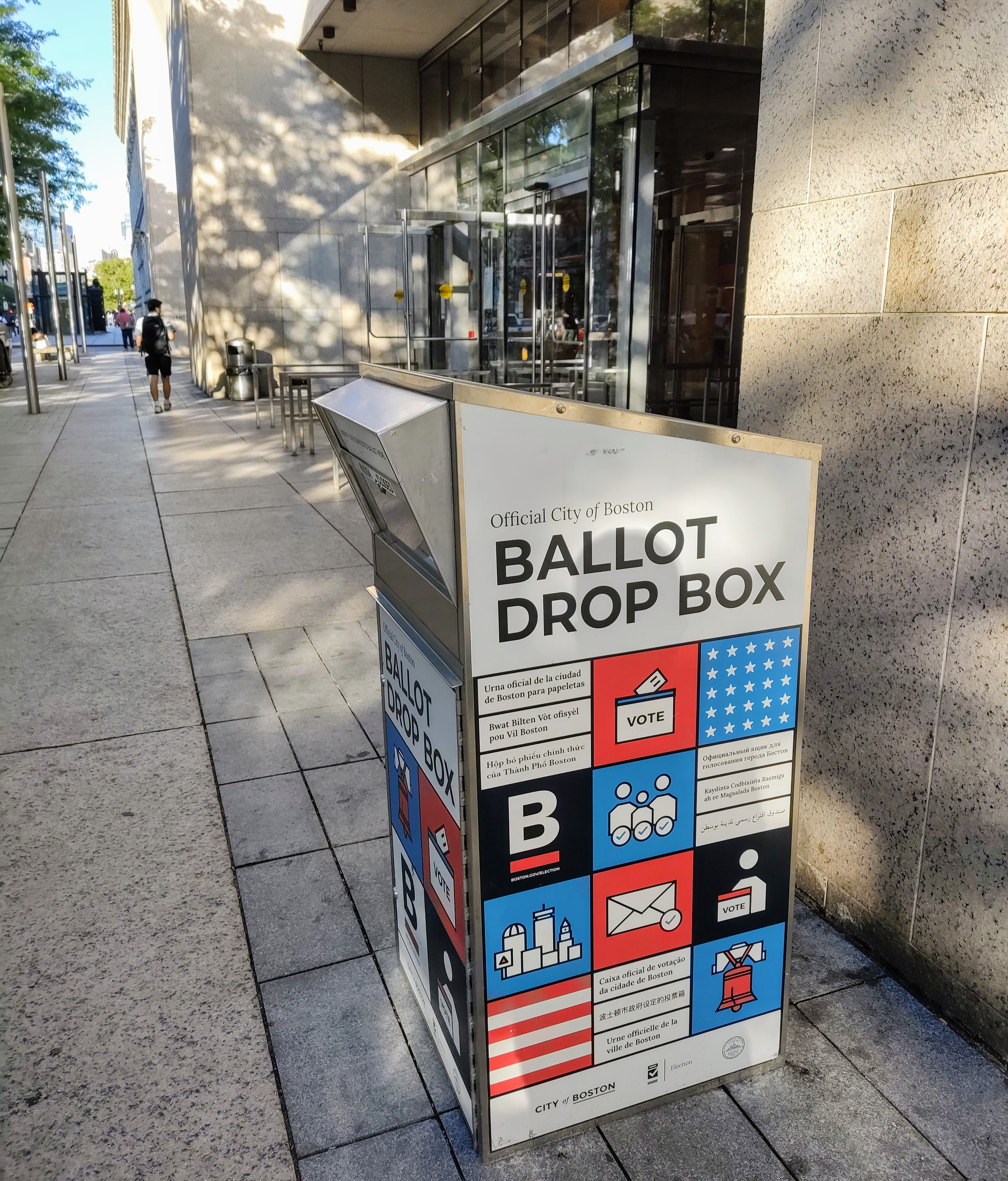
A ballot drop box used for early voting in the city of Boston, Massachusetts

The 7th district is in eastern Massachusetts, including roughly three-fourths of Boston and a few of its northern and southern suburbs. The incumbent was Democrat Ayanna Pressley, who was reelected with 86.6% of the vote in 2020 without major-party opposition.

=== Democratic primary ===
==== Nominee ====
- Ayanna Pressley, incumbent U.S. Representative

==== Endorsements ====
Ayanna Pressley

U.S. Senators

- Bernie Sanders, U.S. Senator from Vermont (Independent)
- Elizabeth Warren, U.S. Senator from Massachusetts

Organizations

- Democracy for America
- Feminist Majority PAC
- Justice Democrats
- League of Conservation Voters
- NARAL Pro-Choice America
- Planned Parenthood Action Fund
- Progressive Democrats of America
- Sierra Club
- Sunrise Movement
- Working Families Party

Labor unions

- SEIU Massachusetts State Council

==== Results ====
Democratic primary results
Party	Candidate	Votes	%
Democratic	Ayanna Pressley (incumbent)	69,227	98.7
Write-in		893	1.3
Total votes		70,120	100.0

=== Republican primary ===
==== Nominee ====
- Donnie Palmer, U.S. Army veteran and professional boxer

==== Endorsements ====
Donnie Palmer

Notable Individuals

- Jim Lyons

==== Results ====
Republican primary results
Party	Candidate	Votes	%
Republican	Donnie Palmer	4,657	97.6
Write-in		114	2.4
Total votes		4,771	100.0

=== General election ===
==== Predictions ====
Source	Ranking	As of
The Cook Political Report	Solid D	November 23, 2021
Inside Elections	Solid D	April 14, 2022
Sabato's Crystal Ball	Safe D	December 2, 2021
Politico	Solid D	April 5, 2022
RCP	Safe D	June 9, 2022
Fox News	Solid D	July 11, 2022
DDHQ	Solid D	July 20, 2022
538	Solid D	June 30, 2022
The Economist	Safe D	September 28, 2022

==== Results ====
2022 Massachusetts's 7th congressional district election
Party	Candidate	Votes	%
Democratic	Ayanna Pressley (incumbent)	151,825	84.6
Republican	Donnie Palmer	27,129	15.1
Write-in		557	0.3
Total votes		179,511	100.0
Democratic hold			

== District 8 ==
2022 Massachusetts's 8th congressional district election
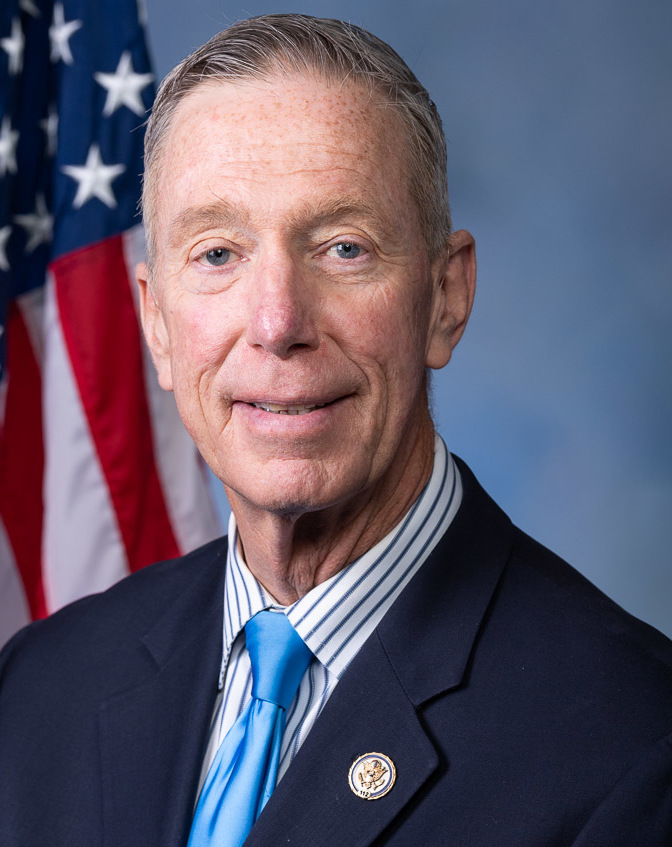

Nominee	Stephen Lynch	Robert Burke
Party	Democratic	Republican
Popular vote	189,987	82,126
Percentage	69.7%	30.1%
- Municipality results Lynch: 50–60% 60–70% 70–80% 80–90%
U.S. Representative before election
Stephen Lynch
Democratic
Elected U.S. Representative
Stephen Lynch
Democratic

The 8th district includes South Boston and the southern Boston metro area. The incumbent was Democrat Stephen F. Lynch, who was reelected with 80.7% of the vote in 2020 without major-party opposition.

=== Democratic primary ===
==== Nominee ====
- Stephen Lynch, incumbent U.S. Representative

==== Endorsements ====
Stephen Lynch

Organizations

- Planned Parenthood Action Fund

==== Results ====
Democratic primary results
Party	Candidate	Votes	%
Democratic	Stephen Lynch (incumbent)	73,191	99.0
Write-in		715	1.0
Total votes		73,906	100.0

=== Republican primary ===
==== Nominee ====
- Robert Burke, videographer

==== Eliminated in primary ====
- Hamilton Rodrigues, real estate broker

==== Endorsements ====
Hamilton Rodrigues

Individuals

- Jim Lyons, chair of the Massachusetts Republican Party

==== Results ====
Republican primary results
Party	Candidate	Votes	%
Republican	Robert Burke	19,173	73.0
Republican	Hamilton Rodrigues	6,977	26.5
Write-in		124	0.5
Total votes		26,274	100.0

=== Independents ===
==== Declared ====
- Derek Smith

=== General election ===
==== Predictions ====
Source	Ranking	As of
The Cook Political Report	Solid D	November 23, 2021
Inside Elections	Solid D	April 14, 2022
Sabato's Crystal Ball	Safe D	December 2, 2021
Politico	Solid D	April 5, 2022
RCP	Safe D	June 9, 2022
Fox News	Solid D	July 11, 2022
DDHQ	Solid D	July 20, 2022
538	Solid D	June 30, 2022
The Economist	Safe D	September 28, 2022

==== Results ====
2022 Massachusetts's 8th congressional district election
Party	Candidate	Votes	%
Democratic	Stephen Lynch (incumbent)	189,987	69.7
Republican	Robert Burke	82,126	30.1
Write-in		451	0.2
Total votes		272,564	100.0
Democratic hold			

== District 9 ==
2022 Massachusetts's 9th congressional district election
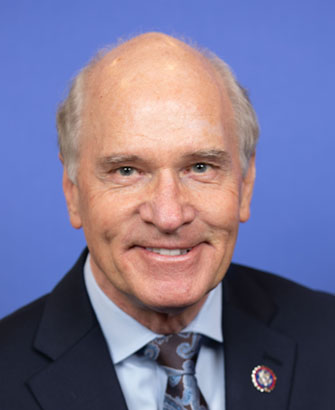

Nominee	Bill Keating	Jesse Brown
Party	Democratic	Republican
Popular vote	197,823	136,347
Percentage	59.2%	40.8%
- Municipality results Keating: 50–60% 60–70% 70–80% 80–90% >90% Brown: 50–60%
U.S. Representative before election
Bill Keating
Democratic
Elected U.S. Representative
Bill Keating
Democratic

The 9th district encompasses Cape Cod and the South Shore, and extends westward into New Bedford, part of Fall River, and surrounding suburbs. The incumbent was Democrat Bill Keating, who was reelected with 61.3% of the vote in 2020.

=== Democratic primary ===
==== Nominee ====
- Bill Keating, incumbent U.S. Representative

==== Endorsements ====
Bill Keating

Organizations

- Planned Parenthood Action Fund

==== Results ====
Democratic primary results
Party	Candidate	Votes	%
Democratic	Bill Keating (incumbent)	81,530	99.7
Write-in		228	0.3
Total votes		81,758	100.0

=== Republican primary ===
==== Nominee ====
- Jesse Brown, member of the MassHire State Workforce Board and Marine Corps veteran

==== Eliminated in primary ====
- Dan Sullivan, registered nurse

==== Endorsements ====
Jesse Brown

Elected Officials

- Charlie Baker, Governor of Massachusetts (2015–2023)
- Karyn Polito, Lieutenant Governor of Massachusetts (2015–2023)
- Joseph Mcdonald, Plymouth County Sheriff (2005–Present)
- Thomas M. Hodgson, Bristol County Sheriff (1997–2003)
- Jim Cummings, Barnstable County Sheriff (1999–2023)

Labor Unions

- State Police Association Of Massachusetts

==== Results ====
Republican primary results
Party	Candidate	Votes	%
Republican	Jesse Brown	24,384	51.3
Republican	Dan Sullivan	23,002	48.4
Write-in		113	0.2
Total votes		47,499	100.0

=== General election ===
==== Predictions ====
Source	Ranking	As of
The Cook Political Report	Solid D	November 23, 2021
Inside Elections	Solid D	April 14, 2022
Sabato's Crystal Ball	Safe D	December 2, 2021
Politico	Likely D	April 6, 2022
RCP	Likely D	November 2, 2022
Fox News	Likely D	September 20, 2022
DDHQ	Likely D	September 29, 2022
538	Solid D	June 30, 2022
The Economist	Likely D	November 1, 2022

==== Results ====
2022 Massachusetts's 9th congressional district election
Party	Candidate	Votes	%
Democratic	Bill Keating (incumbent)	197,823	59.2
Republican	Jesse Brown	136,347	40.8
Write-in		150	0.0
Total votes		334,320	100.0
Democratic hold			
