= Massachusetts's congressional districts =

U.S. House districts in the state of Massachusetts

Map of Massachusetts's congressional districts since 2023 Interactive map version

Massachusetts is currently divided into 9 congressional districts, each represented by a member of the United States House of Representatives. After the 2010 census, the number of seats in Massachusetts was decreased from 10 to 9, due to the State's low growth in population since the year 2000. This mandatory redistricting after the 2010 census eliminated Massachusetts's 10th congressional district, as well as causing a major shift in how the state's congressional districts are currently drawn.

== Current districts and representatives ==
This is a list of United States representatives from Massachusetts in the 118th Congress, their terms, their district boundaries, and the district political ratings, according to the CPVI. The delegation has a total of nine members, all of whom are members of the Democratic party. It is the most populous state in which all members are from the same party.

Current U.S. representatives from Massachusetts
| District | Member (Residence) | Party | Incumbent since | CPVI (2025) | District map |
|---|---|---|---|---|---|
| 1st | Richard Neal (Springfield) | Democratic | January 3, 1989 | D+8 | |
| 2nd | Jim McGovern (Worcester) | Democratic | January 3, 1997 | D+13 | |
| 3rd | Lori Trahan (Westford) | Democratic | January 3, 2019 | D+11 | |
| 4th | Jake Auchincloss (Newton) | Democratic | January 3, 2021 | D+11 | |
| 5th | Katherine Clark (Revere) | Democratic | December 12, 2013 | D+24 | |
| 6th | Seth Moulton (Salem) | Democratic | January 3, 2015 | D+11 | |
| 7th | Ayanna Pressley (Boston) | Democratic | January 3, 2019 | D+34 | |
| 8th | Stephen Lynch (Boston) | Democratic | October 16, 2001 | D+15 | |
| 9th | Bill Keating (Bourne) | Democratic | January 3, 2011 | D+6 | |

== History of apportionment ==
| Census year | Resident population (Note: The resident population excludes the overseas population.) | Number of representatives (Note: Congressional apportionment for each state is based upon (1) the resident population and (2) the overseas U.S. military and federal civilian employees (and their dependents living with them) allocated to their home state, as reported by the employing federal agencies.) | Constituents per representative (Massachusetts) | Constituents per representative (nationally) |
|---|---|---|---|---|
| 1789 | No census | 8 | N/A | N/A |
| 1790 | 378,787 | 14 | 27,056 | 30,000 |
| 1800 | 422,845 | 17 | 24,873 | 33,000 |
| 1810 | 472,040 | 20 | 23,602 | 35,000 |
| 1820 | 523,287 | 13 | 40,253 | 40,000 |
| 1830 | 610,408 | 12 | 50,867 | 47,700 |
| 1840 | 737,699 | 10 | 73,770 | 70,680 |
| 1850 | 994,514 | 11 | 90,410 | 93,425 |
| 1860 | 1,231,066 | 10 | 123,107 | 127,381 |
| 1870 | 1,457,351 | 11 | 132,486 | 131,425 |
| 1880 | 1,783,085 | 12 | 148,590 | 151,912 |
| 1890 | 2,238,947 | 13 | 172,227 | 173,901 |
| 1900 | 2,805,346 | 14 | 200,381 | 194,182 |
| 1910 | 3,366,416 | 16 | 210,401 | 212,407 |
| 1920 | 3,852,356 | 16 | N/A | N/A |
| 1930 | 4,249,614 | 15 | 283,307 | 280,675 |
| 1940 | 4,316,721 | 14 | 308,337 | 301,164 |
| 1950 | 4,690,514 | 14 | 335,037 | 344,587 |
| 1960 | 5,148,578 | 12 | 429,048 | 410,481 |
| 1970 | 5,689,170 | 12 | 477,223 | 469,088 |
| 1980 | 5,737,093 | 11 | 521,549 | 519,235 |
| 1990 | 6,016,425 | 10 | 602,905 | 572,466 |
| 2000 | 6,349,097 | 10 | 635,557 | 646,952 |
| 2010 | 6,547,629 | 9 | 728,849 | 710,767 |

Source: U.S. Census Bureau.

=== Enumeration trends ===
After the 1890 census, and starting with the 53rd United States Congress in 1893, Massachusetts's congressional districts were numbered west to east, with the first district in the west (Berkshire County) and the highest numbered district at Cape Cod. Before then, the district numeration was not as consistent; sometimes running east to west, other times going counter-clockwise around Boston.

== Historical and present district boundaries ==
Table of United States congressional district boundary maps in the State of Massachusetts, presented chronologically. All redistricting events that took place in Massachusetts between 1973 and 2013 are shown.

| Year | Statewide map | Boston highlight |
|---|---|---|
| 1973–1982 | | |
| 1983–1992 | | |
| 1993–2002 | | |
| 2003–2013 | | |
| 2013-2023 | | |
| Since 2023 | | |

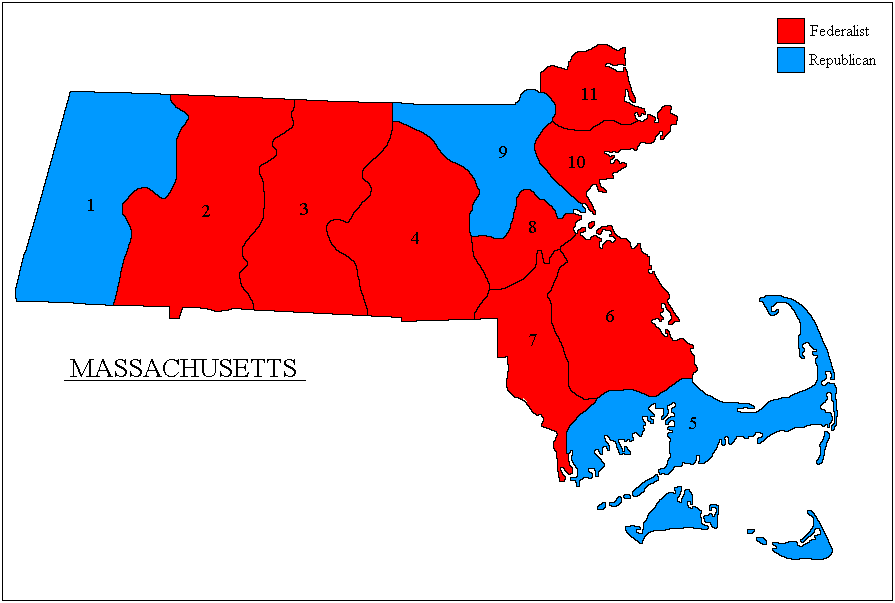
The Commonwealth's districts, as of 1796.

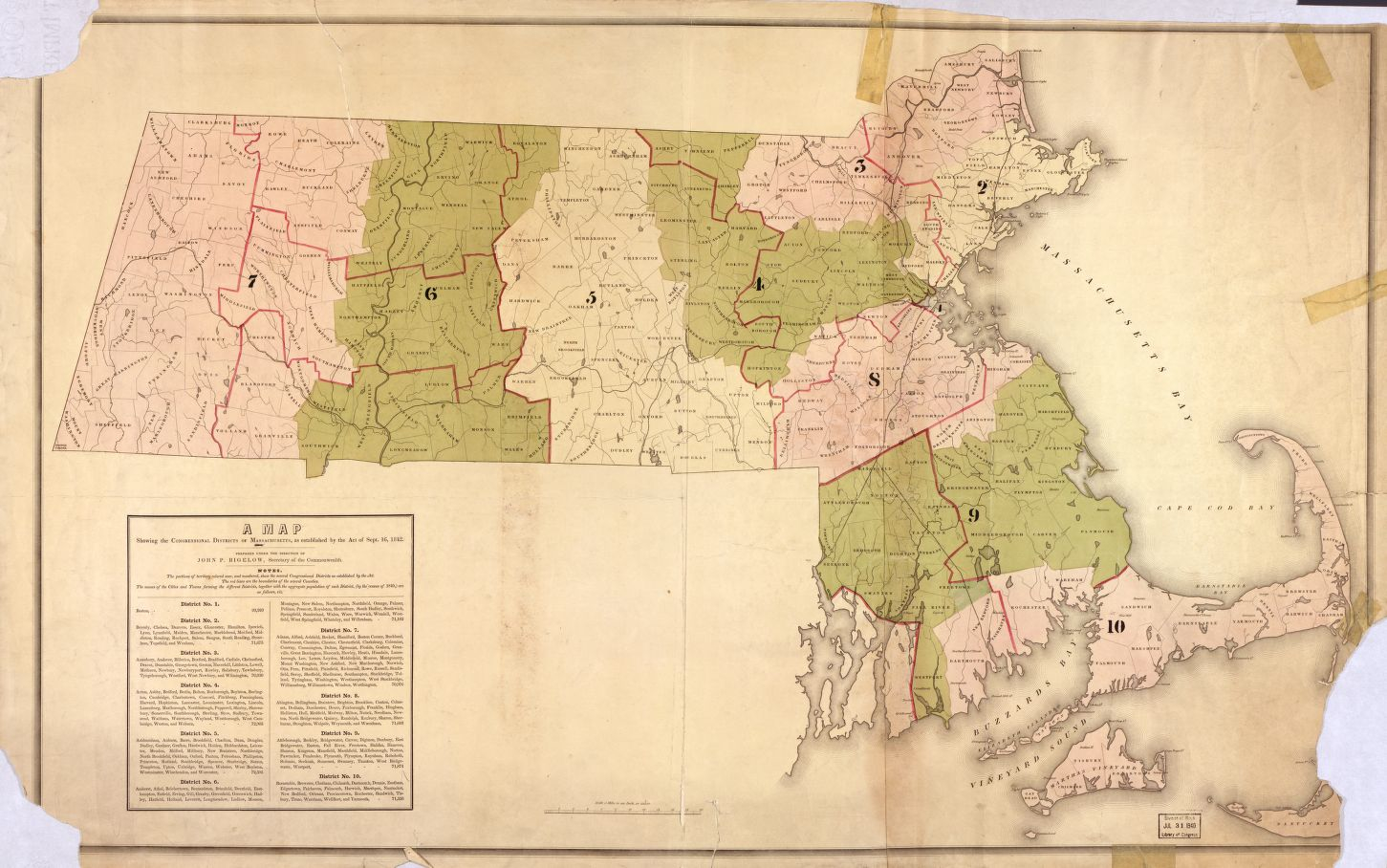
The Commonwealth's districts, as of 1842.

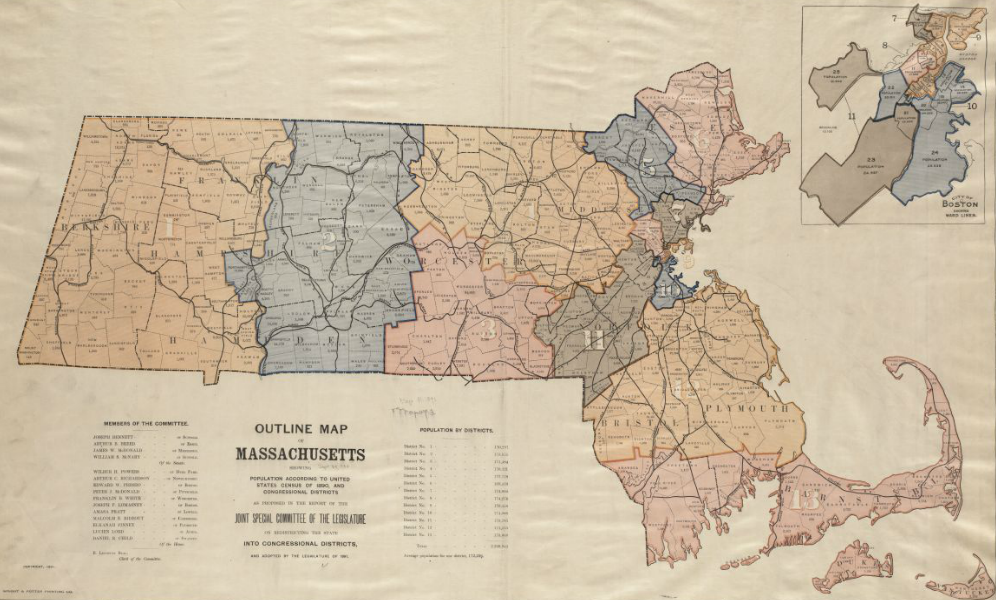
The Commonwealth's districts, as of 1891.

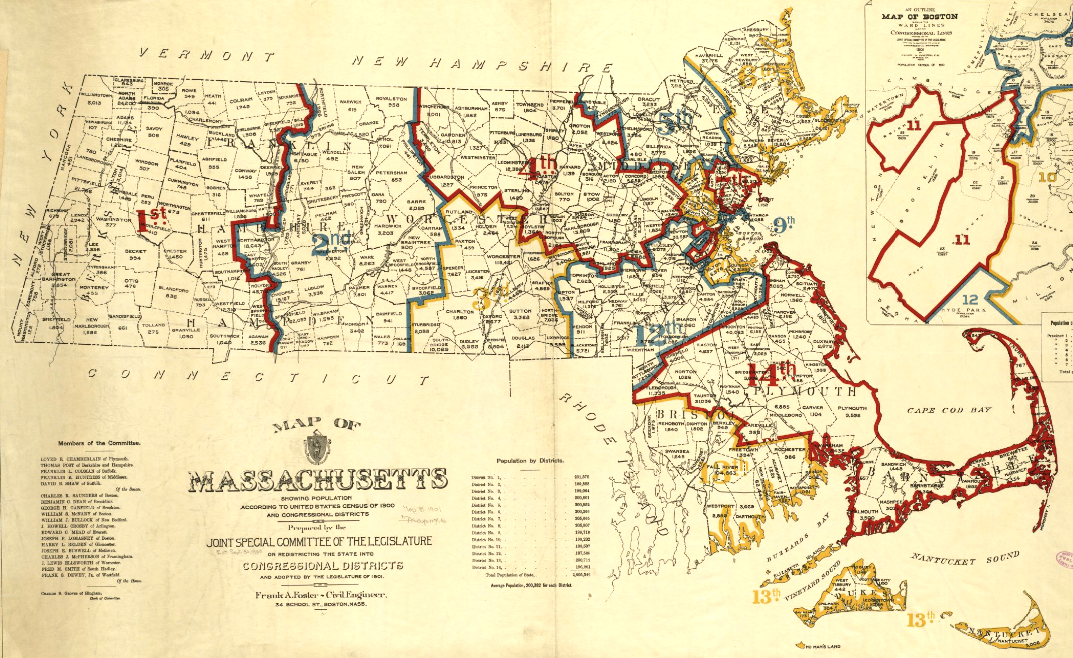
The Commonwealth's districts, as of 1901.

== See also ==
- List of United States congressional districts
