= 2018 United States House of Representatives elections in Massachusetts =

- November 6, 2018

All 9 Massachusetts seats to the United States House of Representatives
	Majority party	Minority party
Party	Democratic	Republican
Last election	9	0
Seats won	9	0
Seat change	Steady	Steady
Popular vote	1,943,595	497,953
Percentage	78.21%	20.03%
Swing	▼1.52%	▲4.69%

Democratic
40–50%
50–60%
60–70%
70–80%
80–90%
90–100%
Republican
40–50%
50–60%

The 2018 United States House of Representatives elections in Massachusetts were held on November 6, 2018, electing the nine U.S. representatives from the Commonwealth of Massachusetts, one from each of the state's nine congressional districts. The elections coincided with the elections of other offices, including a gubernatorial election, other elections to the House of Representatives, elections to the United States Senate, and various state and local elections. The primary election for contested nominations was held on September 4, 2018.

On the night of the election, all nine races were declared in favor of the Democratic Party candidates. Seven seats went to incumbents seeking re-election: Richard Neal (1st District), Jim McGovern (2nd), Joseph Kennedy III (4th), Katherine Clark (5th), Seth Moulton (6th), Stephen F. Lynch (8th), and Bill Keating (9th). In the 7th District, Ayanna Pressley ran unopposed after defeating the incumbent in the primary election. In the 3rd District, where the incumbent did not seek re-election, Lori Trahan was declared the winner.

== Statewide ==
Popular vote
Democratic	78.21%
Republican	20.03%
Other	1.75%

House seats
Democratic	100.00%
Republican	0.00%

=== By district ===
Results of the 2018 United States House of Representatives elections in Massachusetts by district:

District	Democratic		Republican		Others		Total		Result
District	Votes	%	Votes	%	Votes	%	Votes	%	Result
District 1	211,790	97.64%	0	0.00%	5,110	2.36%	216,900	100.0%	Democratic hold
District 2	191,332	67.16%	93,391	32.78%	170	0.06%	284,893	100.0%	Democratic hold
District 3	173,175	62.00%	93,445	33.45%	12,707	4.55%	279,327	100.0%	Democratic hold
District 4	245,289	97.72%	0	0.00%	5,727	2.28%	251,016	100.0%	Democratic hold
District 5	236,243	75.88%	74,856	24.04%	225	0.07%	311,324	100.0%	Democratic hold
District 6	217,703	65.19%	104,798	31.38%	11,474	3.44%	333,975	100.0%	Democratic hold
District 7	216,557	98.25%	0	0.00%	3,852	1.75%	220,409	100.0%	Democratic hold
District 8	259,159	98.42%	0	0.00%	4,148	1.58%	263,307	100.0%	Democratic hold
District 9	192,347	59.38%	131,463	40.58%	118	0.04%	323,928	100.0%	Democratic hold
Total	1,943,595	78.21%	497,953	20.04%	43,531	1.75%	2,485,079	100.0%	

== District 1 ==
2018 Massachusetts's 1st congressional district election
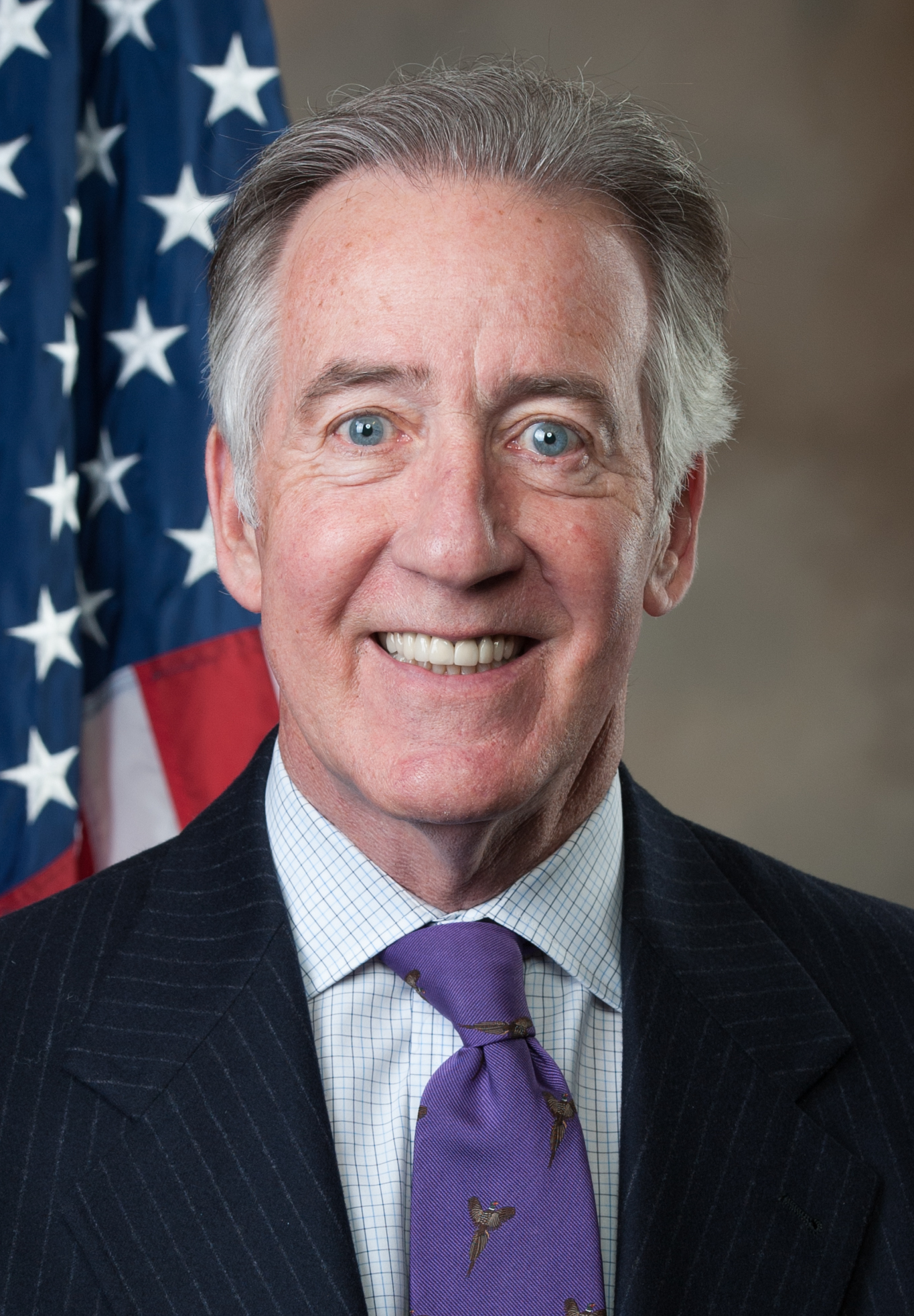
Nominee	Richard Neal
Party	Democratic
Popular vote	211,790
Percentage	97.6%
- Municipality results Neal: 70–80% >90%
U.S. Representative before election
Richard Neal
Democratic
Elected U.S. Representative
Richard Neal
Democratic

The 1st congressional district is located in western and Central Massachusetts. The largest Massachusetts district in area, it covers about 1/3 of the state and is more rural than the rest. It includes the state's highest point, Mount Greylock. The district includes the cities of Springfield, West Springfield, Pittsfield, Holyoke, and Westfield. The district had a PVI of D+12. The incumbent was Democrat Richard Neal, who had represented the district since 2013, and previously represented the 2nd district from 1989 to 2013. He was re-elected with 73% of the vote in 2016. For the fourth election cycle in a row, no Republicans filed to run in this district.

=== Democratic primary ===
==== Debate ====
2018 Massachusetts's 1st congressional district Democratic primary debate
No.	Date	Host	Moderator	Link	Democratic	Democratic
Key: P Participant A Absent N Not invited I Invited W Withdrawn						
Key: P Participant A Absent N Not invited I Invited W Withdrawn					Tahirah Amatul-Wadud	Richard Neal
1	August 30, 2018	League of Women Voters CD-1; WGBY-TV	Carrie Saldo		P	P

==== Primary results ====
Democratic primary results
Party	Candidate	Votes	%
Democratic	Richard Neal (incumbent)	49,213	70.8
Democratic	Tahirah Amatul-Wadud	20,322	29.2
Total votes		69,535	100.0

=== General election ===
==== Predictions ====
Source	Ranking	As of
The Cook Political Report	Safe D	November 5, 2018
Inside Elections	Safe D	November 5, 2018
Sabato's Crystal Ball	Safe D	November 5, 2018
RCP	Safe D	November 5, 2018
Daily Kos	Safe D	November 5, 2018
538	Safe D	November 7, 2018
CNN	Safe D	October 31, 2018
Politico	Safe D	November 2, 2018

==== Results ====
Massachusetts' 1st congressional district, 2018
Party	Candidate	Votes	%
Democratic	Richard Neal (incumbent)	211,790	97.6
Write-in		5,110	2.4
Total votes		216,900	100.0
Democratic hold			

== District 2 ==
2018 Massachusetts's 2nd congressional district election
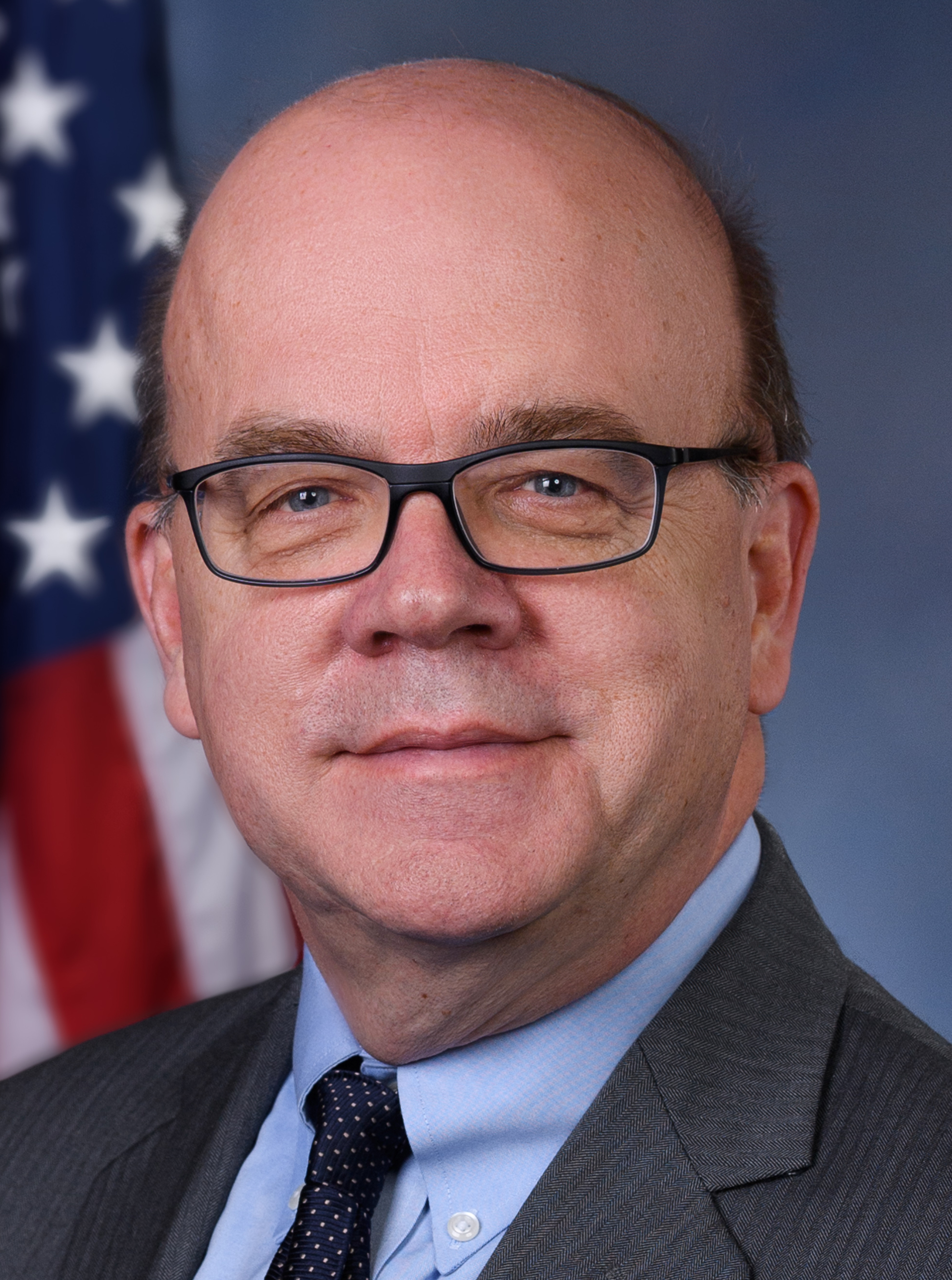

Nominee	Jim McGovern	Tracy Lovvorn
Party	Democratic	Republican
Popular vote	191,332	93,391
Percentage	67.1%	32.8%
- McGovern: 50–60% 60–70% 70–80% 80–90% >90% Lovvorn: 50–60%
U.S. Representative before election
Jim McGovern
Democratic
Elected U.S. Representative
Jim McGovern
Democratic

The 2nd congressional district is located in central Massachusetts. It contains the cities of Worcester, which is the second-largest city in New England after Boston, and Northampton in the Pioneer Valley. The district had a PVI of D+13. The incumbent was Democrat Jim McGovern, who had represented the district since 2013, and previously represented the 3rd district from 1997 to 2013. He was re-elected unopposed with 98% of the vote in 2016.

=== Democratic primary ===
==== Primary results ====
Democratic primary results
Party	Candidate	Votes	%
Democratic	Jim McGovern (incumbent)	53,848	100.0
Total votes		53,848	100.0

=== Republican primary ===
==== Primary results ====
Republican primary results
Party	Candidate	Votes	%
Republican	Tracy Lovvorn	15,583	60.8
Republican	Kevin Powers	10,042	39.2
Total votes		25,625	100.0

=== General election ===
==== Predictions ====
Source	Ranking	As of
The Cook Political Report	Safe D	November 5, 2018
Inside Elections	Safe D	November 5, 2018
Sabato's Crystal Ball	Safe D	November 5, 2018
RCP	Safe D	November 5, 2018
Daily Kos	Safe D	November 5, 2018
538	Safe D	November 7, 2018
CNN	Safe D	October 31, 2018
Politico	Safe D	November 4, 2018

==== Results ====
Massachusetts' 2nd congressional district, 2018
Party	Candidate	Votes	%
Democratic	Jim McGovern (incumbent)	191,332	67.1
Republican	Tracy Lovvorn	93,391	32.8
Write-in		170	0.1
Total votes		284,893	100.0
Democratic hold			

== District 3 ==
2018 Massachusetts's 3rd congressional district election
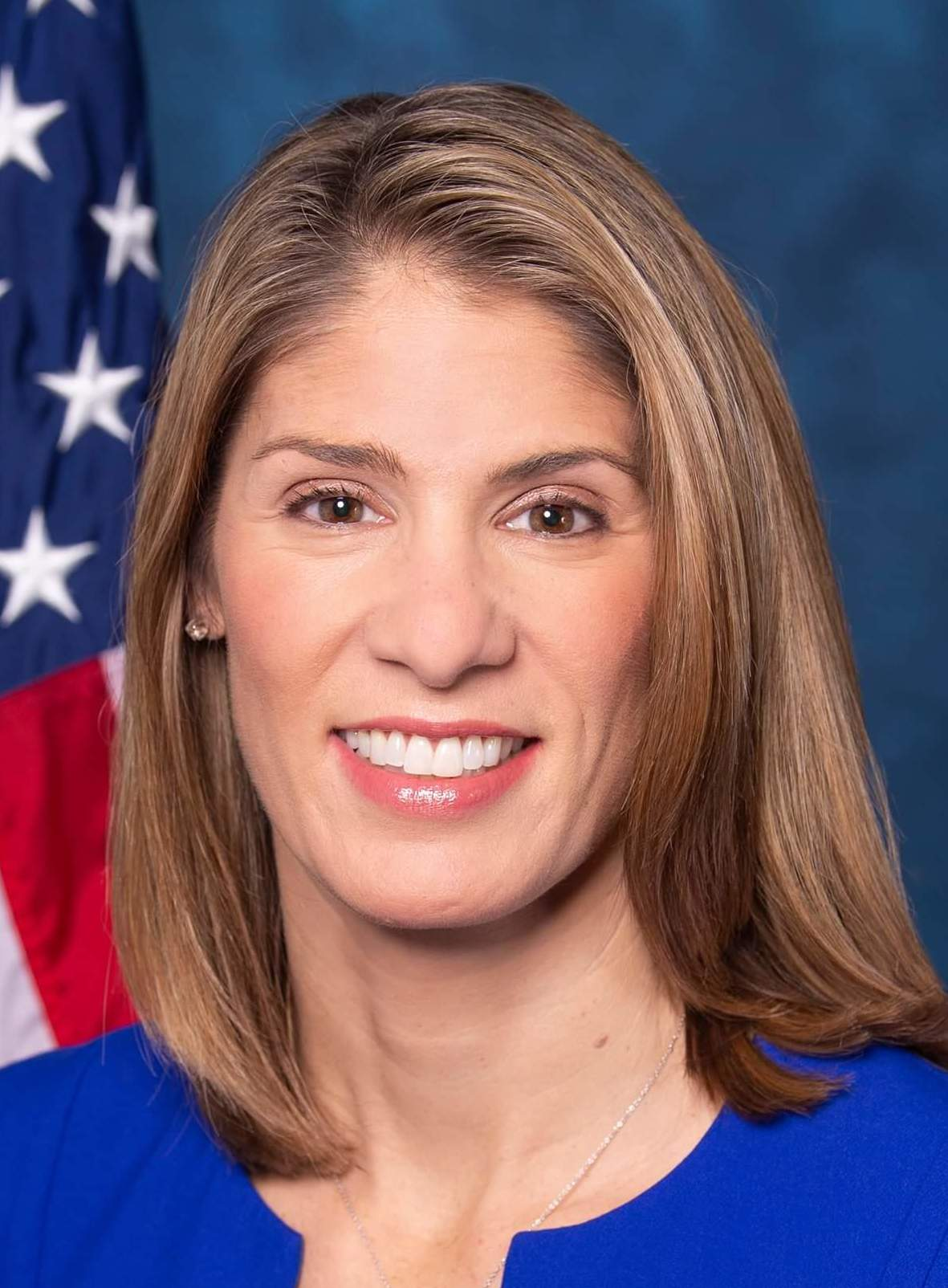

Nominee	Lori Trahan	Rick Green
Party	Democratic	Republican
Popular vote	173,175	93,445
Percentage	62.0%	33.4%
- Trahan: 40–50% 50–60% 60–70% 70–80% 80–90% Green: 40–50% 50–60%
U.S. Representative before election
Niki Tsongas
Democratic
Elected U.S. Representative
Lori Trahan
Democratic

The 3rd congressional district is located in northeastern and central Massachusetts. It contains the Merrimack valley including Lowell, Lawrence and Haverhill. The district had a PVI of D+9. The incumbent was Democrat Niki Tsongas, who had represented the district since 2013, and previously represented the 5th district from 2007 to 2013. She was re-elected with 69% of the vote in 2016.

Tsongas did not seek re-election in 2018.

=== Democratic primary ===
==== Candidates ====
Declared

- Jeffrey Ballinger, labor organizer
- Alexandra Chandler, former Naval Intelligence officer
- Beej Das, president and CEO of Troca Hotels
- Rufus Gifford, former United States Ambassador to Denmark and financial director in Barack Obama's 2012 reelection campaign
- Leonard Golder, chairman of the Stow Democratic Town Committee and former Stow selectman
- Daniel Koh, former chief of staff to Boston mayor Marty Walsh
- Barbara L'Italien, state senator
- Bopha Malone, vice president of Enterprise Bank
- Juana Matias, state representative
- Lori Trahan, former chief of staff to Marty Meehan

Withdrawn

- Steve Kerrigan, former CEO of the DNC and nominee for lieutenant governor in 2014
- Patrick Littlefield, executive director of the U.S. Department of Veterans Affairs’ Center for Innovation
- Nadeem Mazen, Cambridge city councillor

Declined

- Jennifer Benson, state representative
- Stephen DiNatale, mayor of Fitchburg and former state representative (endorsed Gifford)
- Eileen Donoghue, state senator, former mayor of Lowell and candidate for MA-05 in 2007
- Jamie Eldridge, state senator and candidate for MA-05 in 2007
- Rodney Elliott, Lowell city councilor and former mayor of Lowell
- Barry Finegold, former state senator, candidate for MA-05 in 2007 and candidate for state treasurer in 2014
- James Fiorentini, mayor of Haverhill (Endorsed Koh)
- Michael W. Gallagher, attorney and former Lowell School Committee member
- Ellen Murphy Meehan, hospital consultant and ex-wife of former congressman Martin Meehan
- David Nangle, state representative
- Steven Panagiotakos, former state senator
- Dan Rivera, mayor of Lawrence (endorsed Matias)
- Niki Tsongas, incumbent U.S. representative

==== Endorsements ====
Rufus Gifford

Politicians

- Stephen DiNatale, mayor of Fitchburg, Massachusetts
- Tim Kaine, U.S. senator from Virginia
Dan Koh

Organizations

- Local 1421

Politicians

- Tom Clay, Westford, Massachusetts selectman
- Marty Walsh, mayor of Boston
Barbara L'Italien

Organizations

- Massachusetts Nurses Association
Juana Matias

Organizations

- BoldPAC
- Justice Democrats
- Latino Victory Fund

Politicians

- Dan Rivera, mayor of Lawrence
Lori Trahan

Newspapers

- The Boston Globe
- Boston Herald
- Lowell Sun

Politicians

- Tom Golden, state representative
- Marty Meehan, former U.S. representative and University of Massachusetts president
- Rady Mom, state representative
- David Nangle, state representative
- Steve Zanni, mayor of Methuen

==== Polling ====
Poll source	Date(s) administered	Samples size	Margin of error	Jeff Ballinger	Alexandra Chandler	Beej Das	Rufus Gifford	Leonard Golder	Dan Koh	Barbara L'Italien	Bopha Malone	Juana Matias	Lori Trahan	Other	Undecided
UMASS Lowell/Boston Globe	August 14–21, 2018	553	± 5.2%	2%	4%	2%	13%	1%	19%	13%	1%	6%	8%	6%	27%
UMASS Lowell/Boston Globe	April 11–17, 2018	490	± 5.5%	–	3%	0%	11%	–	4%	7%	2%	4%	5%	6%	58%
EMC Research	March 14–19, 2018	500	± 4.4%	–	–	–	5%	–	8%	19%	–	4%	5%	4%	55%

==== Debate ====
2018 Massachusetts's 3rd congressional district Democratic primary debate
No.	Date	Host	Moderator	Link	Democratic	Democratic	Democratic	Democratic
Key: P Participant A Absent N Not invited I Invited W Withdrawn								
Key: P Participant A Absent N Not invited I Invited W Withdrawn					Rufus Gifford	Dan Koh	Barbara L'Italien	Lori Trahan
1	May 12, 2018	FLAP-TV	Kevin Cormier	YouTube	P	P	P	P

==== Primary results ====
Democratic primary results
Party	Candidate	Votes	%
Democratic	Lori Trahan	18,527	21.6
Democratic	Daniel Koh	18,405	21.5
Democratic	Barbara L'Italien	13,029	15.2
Democratic	Juana Matias	12,982	15.1
Democratic	Rufus Gifford	12,856	15.1
Democratic	Alexandra Chandler	4,848	5.7
Democratic	Beej Das	1,496	1.7
Democratic	Jeffrey Ballinger	1,388	1.6
Democratic	Bopha Malone	1,344	1.6
Democratic	Leonard Golder	585	0.7
Democratic	write-ins	131	0.2
Democratic	Blanks	3,227	
Total votes		88,818	100.0

Lori Trahan and Daniel Koh were separated by less than one half of one percent of the votes cast. Koh subsequently requested a recount, which confirmed Trahan's victory.

=== Republican primary ===
==== Candidates ====
Declared

- Rick Green, businessman

Declined

- Mary Burns, political activist and small business owner
- Scott Gunderson, retired Naval officer; dropped out
- Sheila Harrington, state representative
- Mark Hawke, mayor of Gardner
- Mike Kuenzler, businessman
- Beth Lindstrom, former aide to Mitt Romney (running for U.S. Senate)
- Salvatore Lupoli, businessman and founder and CEO of Sal's Pizza
- Ann Wofford, nominee in 2014 and 2016

==== Primary results ====
Republican primary results
Party	Candidate	Votes	%
Republican	Rick Green	24,047	100.0
Total votes		24,047	100.0

=== General election ===
==== Predictions ====
Source	Ranking	As of
The Cook Political Report	Safe D	November 5, 2018
Inside Elections	Safe D	November 5, 2018
Sabato's Crystal Ball	Safe D	November 5, 2018
RCP	Safe D	November 5, 2018
Daily Kos	Safe D	November 5, 2018
538	Safe D	November 7, 2018
CNN	Safe D	October 31, 2018
Politico	Safe D	November 4, 2018

==== Debates ====
2018 Massachusetts's 3rd congressional district debates
No.	Date	Host	Moderator	Link	Democratic	Republican	Independent
Key: P Participant A Absent N Not invited I Invited W Withdrawn							
Key: P Participant A Absent N Not invited I Invited W Withdrawn					Lori Trahan	Rick Green	Mike Mullen
1	Oct. 18, 2018	Fitchburg State University	Charlie Sanamond		P	P	P
2	Oct. 29, 2018	University of Massachusetts Lowell; Lowell Sun	Chris Scott		P	P	P

==== Results ====
Massachusetts' 3rd congressional district, 2018
Party	Candidate	Votes	%
Democratic	Lori Trahan	173,175	62.0
Republican	Rick Green	93,445	33.4
Independent	Mike Mullen	12,572	4.5
Write-in		135	0.1
Total votes		279,327	100.0
Democratic hold			

== District 4 ==
2018 Massachusetts's 4th congressional district election
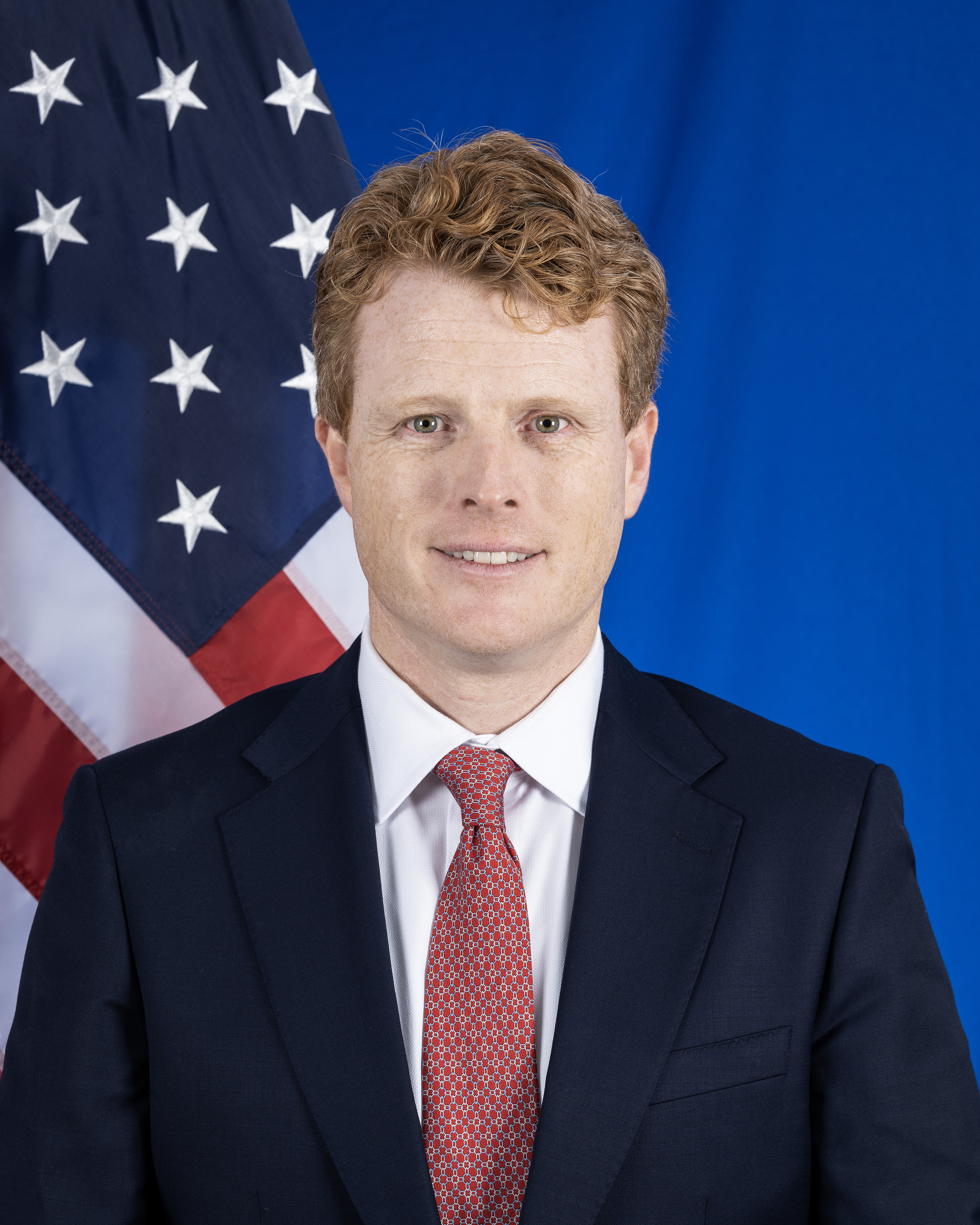
Nominee	Joe Kennedy III
Party	Democratic
Popular vote	245,289
Percentage	97.7%
- County results Kennedy: 90–100%
U.S. Representative before election
Joe Kennedy III
Democratic
Elected U.S. Representative
Joe Kennedy III
Democratic

The 4th congressional district is located mostly in southern Massachusetts. It contains Bristol, Middlesex, Norfolk, Plymouth and Worcester counties. The district had a PVI of D+9. The incumbent was Democrat Joe Kennedy III, who had represented the district since 2013. He was re-elected with 70% of the vote in 2016.

Kennedy was running for re-election. No Republicans filed to run.

=== Democratic primary ===
==== Primary results ====
Democratic primary results
Party	Candidate	Votes	%
Democratic	Joe Kennedy III (incumbent)	59,613	93.4
Democratic	Gary Rucinski	4,156	6.6
Total votes		63,319	100.0

=== General election ===
==== Predictions ====
Source	Ranking	As of
The Cook Political Report	Safe D	November 5, 2018
Inside Elections	Safe D	November 5, 2018
Sabato's Crystal Ball	Safe D	November 5, 2018
RCP	Safe D	November 5, 2018
Daily Kos	Safe D	November 5, 2018
538	Safe D	November 7, 2018
CNN	Safe D	October 31, 2018
Politico	Safe D	November 4, 2018

==== Results ====
Massachusetts' 4th congressional district, 2018
Party	Candidate	Votes	%
Democratic	Joe Kennedy III (incumbent)	245,289	97.7
Write-in		5,727	2.3
Total votes		251,016	100.0
Democratic hold			

== District 5 ==
2018 Massachusetts's 5th congressional district election
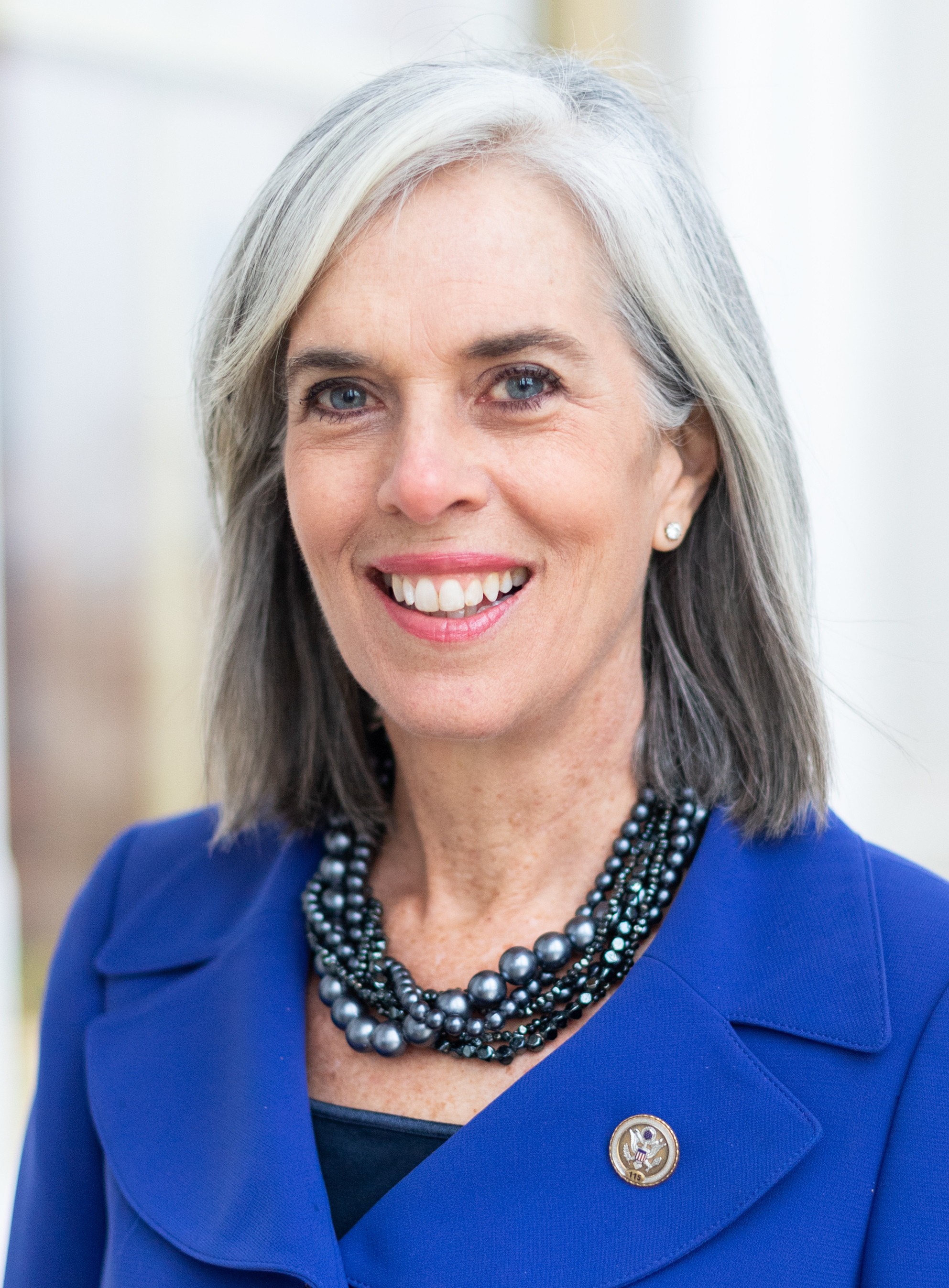

Nominee	Katherine Clark	John Hugo
Party	Democratic	Republican
Popular vote	236,243	74,856
Percentage	75.9%	24.0%
- Clark: 50–60% 60–70% 70–80% 80–90% >90%
U.S. Representative before election
Katherine Clark
Democratic
Elected U.S. Representative
Katherine Clark
Democratic

The 5th congressional district is located in eastern Massachusetts. It contains Middlesex, Suffolk and Worcester counties. The district had a PVI of D+18. The incumbent was Democrat Katherine Clark, who had represented the district since winning a special election in 2013. She was re-elected unopposed with 99% of the vote in 2016.

=== Democratic primary ===
==== Primary results ====
Democratic primary results
Party	Candidate	Votes	%
Democratic	Katherine Clark (incumbent)	78,156	100.0
Total votes		78,156	100.0

=== Republican primary ===
John Hugo was a Republican candidate for the Massachusetts' 5th congressional district in Massachusetts who was running against Katherine Clark in the United States House of Representatives elections in Massachusetts, 2018. John Hugo was certified to appear on the ballot for the 2018 elections on May 17, 2018, to run against Katherine Clark.

==== Primary results ====
Republican primary results
Party	Candidate	Votes	%
Republican	John Hugo	11,845	63.7
Republican	Louis Kuchnir	6,745	36.3
Total votes		18,590	100.0

=== General election ===
==== Predictions ====
Source	Ranking	As of
The Cook Political Report	Safe D	November 5, 2018
Inside Elections	Safe D	November 5, 2018
Sabato's Crystal Ball	Safe D	November 5, 2018
RCP	Safe D	November 5, 2018
Daily Kos	Safe D	November 5, 2018
538	Safe D	November 7, 2018
CNN	Safe D	October 31, 2018
Politico	Safe D	November 4, 2018

==== Results ====
Massachusetts' 5th congressional district, 2018
Party	Candidate	Votes	%
Democratic	Katherine Clark (incumbent)	236,243	75.9
Republican	John Hugo	74,856	24.0
Write-in		225	0.1
Total votes		311,324	100.0
Democratic hold			

== District 6 ==
2018 Massachusetts's 6th congressional district election
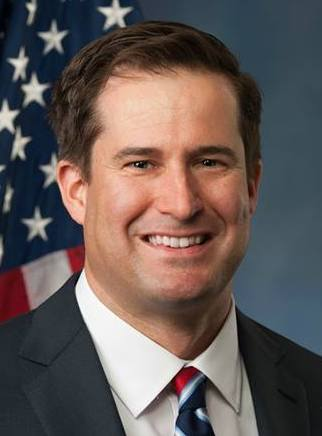

Nominee	Seth Moulton	Joseph Schneider
Party	Democratic	Republican
Popular vote	217,703	104,798
Percentage	65.2%	31.4%
- Moulton: 50–60% 60–70% 70–80% 80–90% Schneider: 40–50%
U.S. Representative before election
Seth Moulton
Democratic
Elected U.S. Representative
Seth Moulton
Democratic

The 6th congressional district is located in northeastern Massachusetts. It contains most of Essex County, including the North Shore and Cape Ann. The district had a PVI of D+6. The incumbent was Democrat Seth Moulton, who had represented the district since 2015. He was re-elected unopposed with 98% of the vote in 2016.

=== Democratic primary ===
==== Primary results ====
Democratic primary results
Party	Candidate	Votes	%
Democratic	Seth Moulton (incumbent)	59,326	100.0
Total votes		59,326	100.0

=== Republican primary ===
Joseph Schneider was running for the Republican nomination.

==== Primary results ====
Republican primary results
Party	Candidate	Votes	%
Republican	Joseph Schneider	26,579	99.8
Republican	Carlos Armando Gonzalez (write-in)	51	0.2
Total votes		26,630	100.0

=== General election ===
==== Predictions ====
Source	Ranking	As of
The Cook Political Report	Safe D	November 5, 2018
Inside Elections	Safe D	November 5, 2018
Sabato's Crystal Ball	Safe D	November 5, 2018
RCP	Safe D	November 5, 2018
Daily Kos	Safe D	November 5, 2018
538	Safe D	November 7, 2018
CNN	Safe D	October 31, 2018
Politico	Safe D	November 4, 2018

==== Results ====
Massachusetts' 6th congressional district, 2018
Party	Candidate	Votes	%
Democratic	Seth Moulton (incumbent)	217,703	65.2
Republican	Joseph Schneider	104,798	31.4
Independent	Mary Charbonneau	11,309	3.4
Write-in		165	0.0
Total votes		333,975	100.0
Democratic hold			

== District 7 ==
2018 Massachusetts's 7th congressional district election
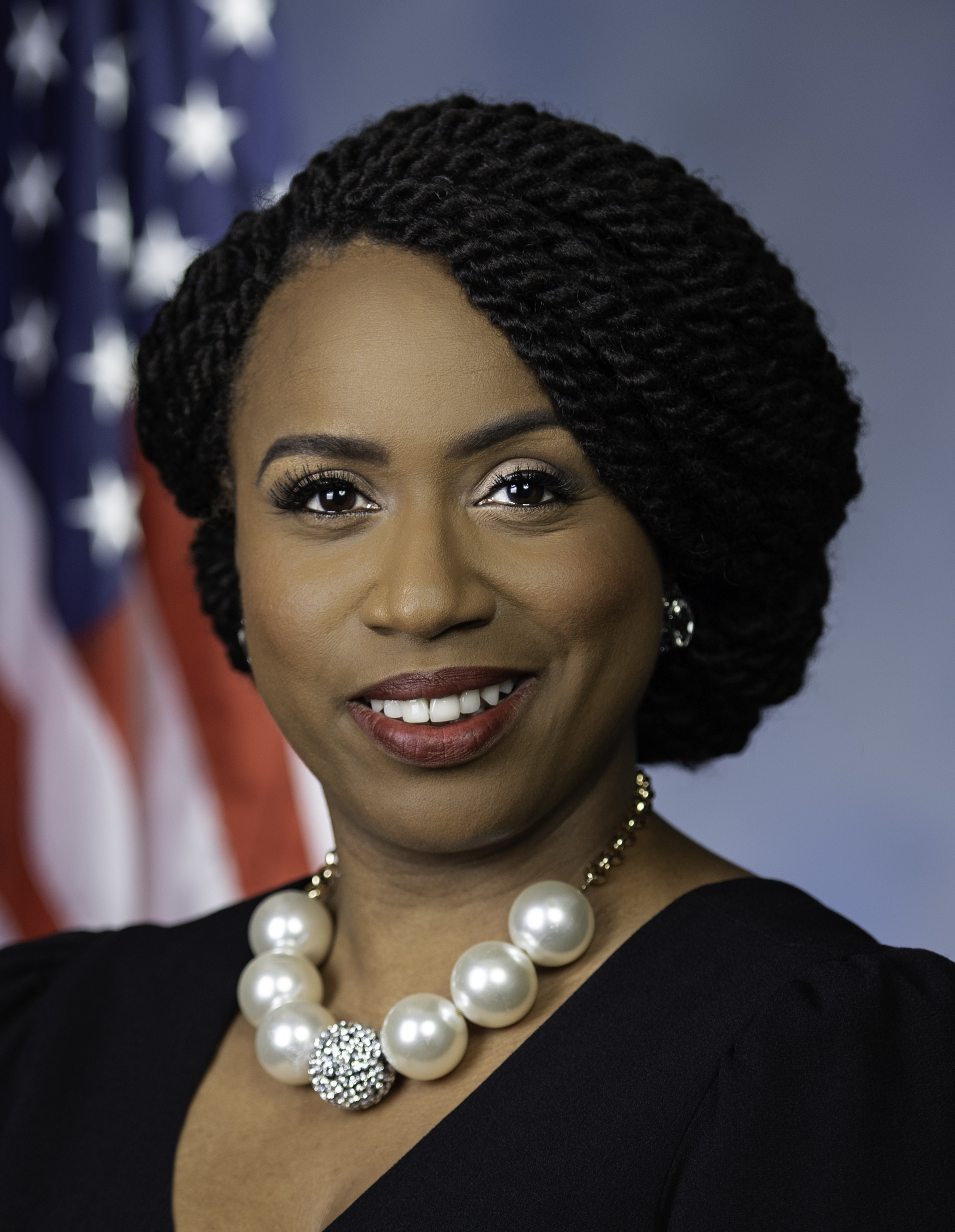
Nominee	Ayanna Pressley
Party	Democratic
Popular vote	216,557
Percentage	98.2%
- County results Pressley: 90–100%
U.S. Representative before election
Mike Capuano
Democratic
Elected U.S. Representative
Ayanna Pressley
Democratic

The 7th congressional district is located in eastern Massachusetts. It contains the northern three-quarters of the city of Boston, the city of Somerville and parts of the city of Cambridge. The district had a PVI of D+34. The incumbent was Democrat Mike Capuano, who had represented the district since 2013, and previously represented the 8th district from 1999 to 2013. He was re-elected unopposed with 99% of the vote in 2016.

In his bid for re-nomination by the Democratic Party, Capuano was defeated by Boston city councillor Ayanna Pressley. The primary victory was a surprise, as the last poll before the election showed Capuano with a significant lead, 48% to 35%. Part of the reason the polls may have been inaccurate was a surge in the number of primary voters. 24% of District 7 voters in the 2018 primary had not voted in the five previous primaries, and that percentage was disproportionately of Hispanic and Asian ethnicities.

=== Democratic primary ===
==== Candidates ====
Declared

- Mike Capuano, incumbent representative
- Ayanna Pressley, Boston city councillor

Declined

- Nadeem Mazen, Cambridge city councillor

==== Endorsements ====
Mike Capuano

Federal politicians

- Katherine Clark, US representative (D-MA).
- Luis Gutiérrez, U.S. representative (D-IL)
- Joe Kennedy III, US representative (D-MA)
- John Lewis, U.S. representative (D-GA)
- Stephen Lynch, US representative (D-MA).
- James McGovern, US representative (D-MA).
- Richard Neal, US representative (D-MA).
- Maxine Waters, U.S. representative (D-CA)

Local and statewide politicians

- Carlo Basile, former state representative
- Joseph Boncore, state senator
- Salvatore LaMattina, former Boston city councilor
- Adrian Madaro, state representative
- John Nucci, former Boston city councilor
- Deval Patrick, former governor of Massachusetts
- Marty Walsh, Mayor of Boston

Organizations

- American Federation of Teachers Massachusetts
- Bay State Stonewall Democrats
- Congressional Black Caucus
- Human Rights Campaign
- Mass Retirees
- Massachusetts AFL–CIO
- Massachusetts Nurses Association
- Massachusetts Organization of State Engineers and Scientists
- Massachusetts Peace Action
- Massachusetts Police Association
- Massachusetts Teachers Association
- National Association of Realtors
- National Committee to Preserve Social Security and Medicare
- National Education Association
- New England Regional Council of Carpenters
- Professional Fire Fighters of Massachusetts
Ayanna Pressley

Statewide and local politicians

- Maura Healey, Massachusetts attorney general
- Enio Lopez, Chelsea city councilor
- Jair Rodriguez, Chelsea city councilor
- Setti Warren, former mayor of Newton
- Damali Vidot, Chelsea city council president
- Michelle Wu, Boston City councilor

Individuals

- John E. Walsh, former chairman of the Democratic Party of Massachusetts

Labor unions

- International Brotherhood of Electrical Workers Local 103
- UNITE HERE Local 26

Organizations

- Brand New Congress
- Democracy for America
- Justice Democrats
- Progressive Massachusetts

Newspapers and news websites

- The Boston Globe
- The Boston Herald

==== Polling ====
Poll source	Date(s) administered	Sample size	Margin of error	Mike Capuano	Ayanna Pressley	Other	Undecided
WBUR	July 27–29, 2018	403	± 4.9%	48%	35%	2%	15%
Emerson College	July 19–21, 2018	400	± 5.2%	38%	29%	–	33%
WBUR	February 9–11, 2018	402	± 4.9%	47%	35%	2%	15%

==== Debate ====
2018 Massachusetts's 7th congressional district democratic primary debate
No.	Date	Host	Moderator	Link	Democratic	Democratic
Key: P Participant A Absent N Not invited I Invited W Withdrawn						
Key: P Participant A Absent N Not invited I Invited W Withdrawn					Mike Capuano	Ayanna Pressley
1	August 15, 2018	WGBH-TV	Jim Braude		P	P

==== Primary results ====
Democratic primary results by precinct: Pressley: 50–60%; 60–70%; 70–80%; 80–90%; 90–100%; Capuano: 50–60%; 60–70%; 70–80%; No votes

Democratic primary results
Party	Candidate	Votes	%
Democratic	Ayanna Pressley	59,815	58.6
Democratic	Mike Capuano (incumbent)	42,252	41.4
Total votes		102,067	100.0

=== General election ===
==== Predictions ====
Source	Ranking	As of
The Cook Political Report	Safe D	November 5, 2018
Inside Elections	Safe D	November 5, 2018
Sabato's Crystal Ball	Safe D	November 5, 2018
RCP	Safe D	November 5, 2018
Daily Kos	Safe D	November 5, 2018
538	Safe D	November 7, 2018
CNN	Safe D	October 31, 2018
Politico	Safe D	November 4, 2018

==== Results ====
Massachusetts' 7th congressional district, 2018
Party	Candidate	Votes	%
Democratic	Ayanna Pressley	216,557	98.2
Write-in		3,852	1.8
Total votes		220,409	100.0
Democratic hold			

== District 8 ==
2018 Massachusetts's 8th congressional district election
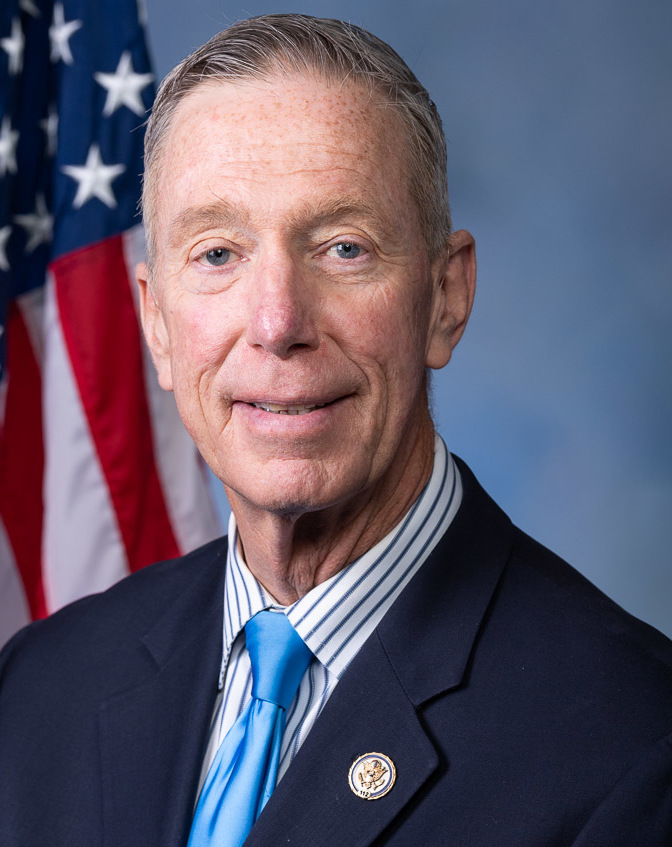
Nominee	Stephen Lynch
Party	Democratic
Popular vote	259,159
Percentage	98.4%
- County results Lynch: 90–100% 100–110%
U.S. Representative before election
Stephen Lynch
Democratic
Elected U.S. Representative
Stephen Lynch
Democratic

The 8th congressional district is located in eastern Massachusetts. It contains the southern quarter of the city of Boston and many of its southern suburbs. The incumbent was Democrat Stephen Lynch, who had represented the district since 2013, and previously represented the 9th district from 2001 to 2013. The district had a PVI of D+10. He was re-elected with 72% of the vote in 2016.

Lynch ran for re-election. No Republicans filed to run.

=== Democratic primary ===
Two political newcomers ran against Lynch in the primary, video game developer Brianna Wu and pilot Christopher Voehl. No debates were held in this race.

==== Primary results ====
Democratic primary results
Party	Candidate	Votes	%
Democratic	Stephen Lynch (incumbent)	51,882	71.0
Democratic	Brianna Wu	16,766	23.0
Democratic	Christopher Voehl	4,399	6.0
Total votes		73,047	100.0

=== General election ===
==== Predictions ====
Source	Ranking	As of
The Cook Political Report	Safe D	November 5, 2018
Inside Elections	Safe D	November 5, 2018
Sabato's Crystal Ball	Safe D	November 5, 2018
RCP	Safe D	November 5, 2018
Daily Kos	Safe D	November 5, 2018
538	Safe D	November 7, 2018
CNN	Safe D	October 31, 2018
Politico	Safe D	November 4, 2018

==== Results ====
Massachusetts' 8th congressional district, 2018
Party	Candidate	Votes	%
Democratic	Stephen Lynch (incumbent)	259,159	98.4
Write-in		4,148	1.6
Total votes		263,307	100.0
Democratic hold			

== District 9 ==
2018 Massachusetts's 9th congressional district election
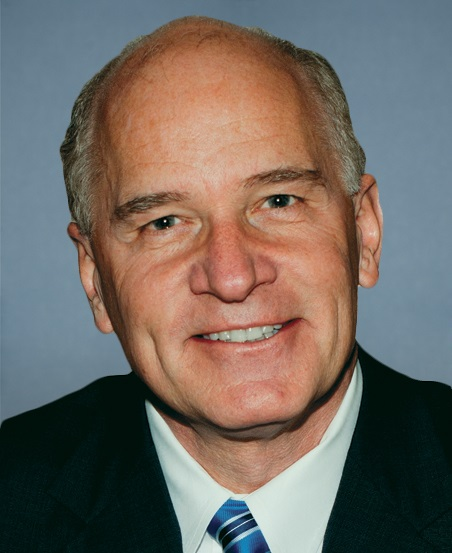

Nominee	Bill Keating	Peter Tedeschi
Party	Democratic	Republican
Popular vote	192,347	131,463
Percentage	59.4%	40.6%
- Keating: 50–60% 60–70% 70–80% 80–90% >90% Tedeschi: 50–60%
U.S. Representative before election
Bill Keating
Democratic
Elected U.S. Representative
Bill Keating
Democratic

The 9th congressional district is located in eastern Massachusetts, including Cape Cod and the South Coast. It contains all of Barnstable, Dukes and Nantucket counties and parts of Bristol and Plymouth counties. The district had a PVI of D+4. The incumbent was Democrat Bill Keating, who had represented the district since 2013, and previously represented the 10th district from 2011 to 2013. He was re-elected with 56% of the vote in 2016.

=== Democratic primary ===
Bill Cimbrelo, a businessman and former environmental chemist from Osterville, announced that he planned to challenge Keating in the September primary. Cimbrelo previously ran for U.S. Senate against former senator Scott Brown in 2012 as an independent candidate.

==== Primary results ====
Democratic primary results
Party	Candidate	Votes	%
Democratic	Bill Keating (incumbent)	50,084	85.5
Democratic	Bill Cimbrelo	8,523	14.5
Total votes		58,607	100.0

=== Republican primary ===
Peter Tedeschi sought the Republican nomination; he is the former CEO of Tedeschi Food Shops.

==== Primary results ====
Republican primary results
Party	Candidate	Votes	%
Republican	Peter Tedeschi	35,911	100.0
Total votes		35,911	100.0

=== General election ===
==== Predictions ====
Source	Ranking	As of
The Cook Political Report	Safe D	November 5, 2018
Inside Elections	Safe D	November 5, 2018
Sabato's Crystal Ball	Safe D	November 5, 2018
RCP	Safe D	November 5, 2018
Daily Kos	Safe D	November 5, 2018
538	Safe D	November 7, 2018
CNN	Safe D	October 31, 2018
Politico	Safe D	November 4, 2018

==== Results ====
Massachusetts' 9th congressional district, 2018
Party	Candidate	Votes	%
Democratic	Bill Keating (incumbent)	192,347	59.4
Republican	Peter Tedeschi	131,463	40.6
Write-in		118	0.0
Total votes		323,928	100.0
Democratic hold			
