= Dan Koh =

American politician (born 1985)

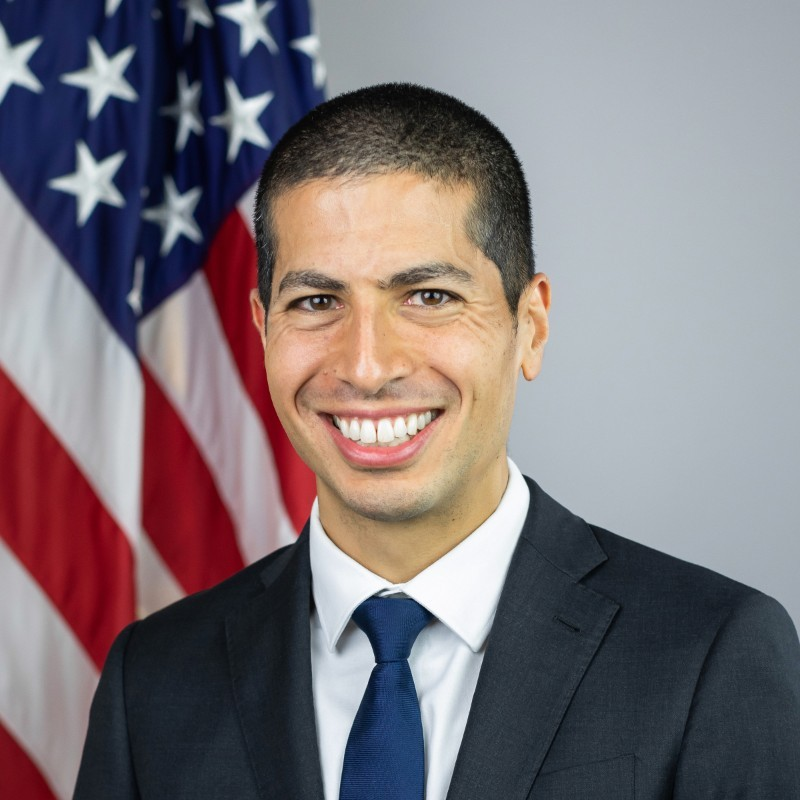
- Official portrait, 2021

Member-elect of the U.S. House of Representatives from Massachusetts's 6th district
- Assuming office January 3, 2027
- Succeeding: Seth Moulton

Personal details
- Born: Daniel Arrigg Koh; January 1, 1985 (age 41) Andover, Massachusetts, U.S.
- Party: Democratic
- Spouse: Amy Sennett (m. 2016)
- Children: 2
- Relatives: Howard Koh (father); Harold Koh (uncle)
- Education: Harvard University (BA, MBA)
- Website: Campaign website

Korean name
- Hangul: 고원형
- Hanja: 高元亨
- RR: Go Wonhyeong
- MR: Ko Wŏnhyŏng

Daniel Arrigg Koh (Korean: 고원형; born January 1, 1985) is an American politician. He was a deputy assistant to President Joe Biden and deputy director of the White House Office of Intergovernmental Affairs. He is representative-elect in Massachusetts's 6th congressional district.

== Early life and education ==
Koh was born in Andover, Massachusetts, to doctors Howard K. Koh and Claudia A. Arrigg, the middle of three children. His father later served as United States Assistant Secretary for Health for President Barack Obama. Koh's mother is a granddaughter of Lebanese Christian emigrants who arrived in Lawrence, Massachusetts, in the 1890s. His uncle, Harold Hongju Koh, was Dean of Yale Law School and a Legal Adviser of the Department of State.

Koh and his two siblings graduated from Phillips Academy, where their mother attended and serves as an alumni trustee. He earned a Bachelor of Arts from Harvard University and a Master of Business Administration from Harvard Business School.

== Career ==
At the age of 29, Koh became chief of staff to Boston Mayor Marty Walsh after a stint as chief of staff for Arianna Huffington. Koh was featured in Forbes 30 Under 30 and the Boston Business Journal's 40 Under 40. He left the Walsh administration to run in the 2018 election for Massachusetts's 3rd congressional district, whose Democratic primary he lost to Lori Trahan by 145 votes, receiving 18,435 votes to Trahan's 18,580 votes.

=== Local government ===
In 2019, Koh was elected to the Board of Selectmen in Andover, Massachusetts. Koh received 2,733 votes--more than any other candidate. He resigned from the Board of Selectmen in February 2021 to join the Biden Administration.

=== Biden Administration ===
In 2021, Walsh, who had become United States Secretary of Labor under Joe Biden, named Koh as his chief of staff. Koh later served as Special Assistant to the President and Deputy Cabinet Secretary at the White House. He concluded his service as Deputy Assistant to the President and deputy director of the White House Office of Intergovernmental Affairs. Koh was seen as a potential candidate for Lieutenant Governor of Massachusetts in the 2022 Massachusetts gubernatorial election. Koh did not run, and Kim Driscoll was ultimately elected lieutenant governor.

=== 2026 congressional campaign ===
Following Seth Moulton's announcement that he would run for the United States Senate, Koh announced in October 2025 that he would be running in the 2026 election for Massachusetts's 6th congressional district, the only open seat of the cycle in the Massachusetts congressional delegation. He was endorsed by both Joe Biden and Kamala Harris.

Koh won the Democratic primary on September 1, 2026, with a plurality of 41.1%, beating runner-up Tram Nguyen by nearly 12 points. He also won the general election, making him the first Asian American elected to Congress from Massachusetts.

== Personal life ==
Koh is married to Amy Sennett, a lecturer in law at Columbia Law School and general counsel at micro1. They met at Harvard, where Koh was pursuing an MBA and Sennett a JD/MBA. The couple eloped in 2016 to Boston City Hall, where Koh's boss, Mayor Marty Walsh, officiated. A religious ceremony was held the following month. Koh and his wife have two children: a son and a daughter.

Koh has ADHD.

== Electoral history ==
2018 Massachusetts' 3rd congressional district Democratic primary
Party	Candidate	Votes	%
Democratic	Lori Trahan	18,527	21.6
Democratic	Dan Koh	18,405	21.5
Democratic	Barbara L'Italien	13,029	15.2
Democratic	Juana Matias	12,982	15.1
Democratic	Rufus Gifford	12,856	15.1
Democratic	Alexandra Chandler	4,848	5.7
Democratic	Beej Das	1,496	1.7
Democratic	Jeffrey Ballinger	1,388	1.6
Democratic	Bopha Malone	1,344	1.6
Democratic	Leonard Golder	585	0.7
Write-in		131	0.2
Total votes		88,818	100.0

2026 Massachusetts' 6th Congressional district Democratic primary
Party	Candidate	Votes	%
Democratic	Dan Koh	47,835	40.9
Democratic	Tram Nguyen	34,324	29.4
Democratic	John Beccia	14,215	12.2
Democratic	Jamie Belsito	11,268	9.6
Democratic	Mariah Lancaster (withdrawn)	4,725	4.0
Democratic	Beth Andres-Beck	4,385	3.8
Write-in		156	0.1
Total votes		116,908	100.0

U.S. House of Representatives
Preceded by Seth Moulton	Member of the U.S. House of Representatives from Massachusetts's 6th congressional district Taking office 2027	Elect
