= Lori Trahan =

American politician (born 1973)

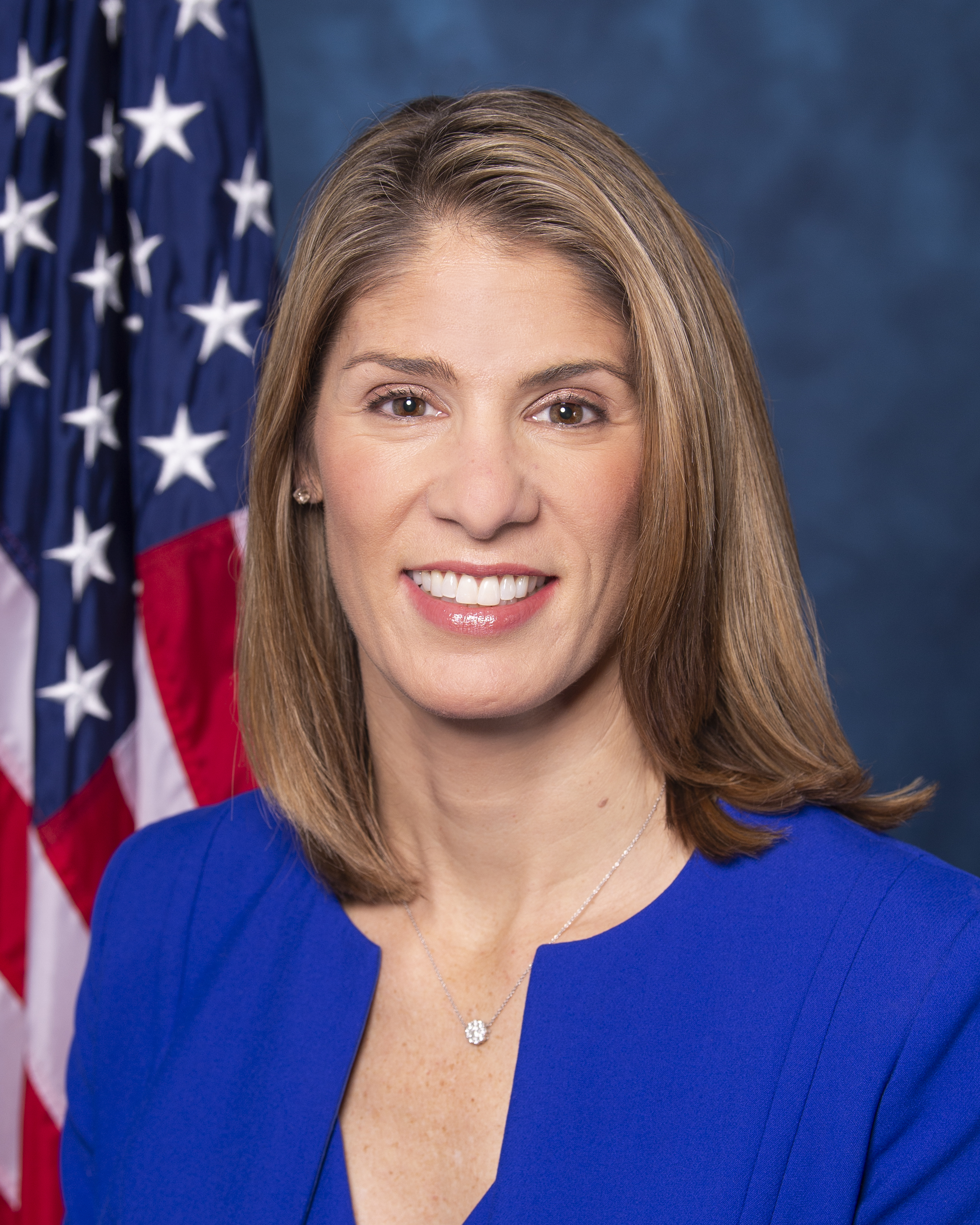
- Official portrait, 2018

Co-Chair of the House Democratic Policy and Communications Committee
- Incumbent
- Assumed office November 29, 2023 Serving with Veronica Escobar (2023–2025), Lauren Underwood, Maxwell Frost (2025–)
- Leader: Hakeem Jeffries
- Preceded by: Dean Phillips

Member of the U.S. House of Representatives from Massachusetts's 3rd district
- Incumbent
- Assumed office January 3, 2019
- Preceded by: Niki Tsongas

Personal details
- Born: Lori Ann Loureiro; October 27, 1973 (age 53) Lowell, Massachusetts, U.S.
- Party: Democratic
- Spouse: David Trahan
- Children: 5
- Education: Georgetown University (BS)
- Website: House website Campaign website

Lori Ann Trahan (/trəˈhæn/ trə-HANN; née Loureiro; born October 27, 1973) is an American businesswoman and politician serving as the U.S. representative for Massachusetts's 3rd congressional district since 2019. The district covers Boston's northwestern suburbs, and includes Lowell, Lawrence, Concord, and Trahan's hometown, Westford. A Democrat, she formerly served as chief of staff to Representative Marty Meehan in Massachusetts's 5th congressional district.

== Early life and education ==
Trahan was born on October 27, 1973, and raised in Lowell, Massachusetts. She grew up with three sisters. Trahan attended Lowell High School, into whose Sports Hall of Fame she was later inducted. Trahan has said her family lived "paycheck to paycheck". Her father, Tony Loureiro, had Portuguese parents. His father was from Porto, and his mother was born in Brazil to Portuguese parents and moved to the Azores to live with relatives as a child after her mother's death. Trahan's mother is also of partial Portuguese ancestry (from the Azores).

At Lowell High, Trahan earned an athletic scholarship in volleyball to Georgetown University. She graduated from Georgetown's Walsh School of Foreign Service with a bachelor's degree in comparative and regional studies in international relations.

== Career ==
After college, Trahan worked for Marty Meehan, the U.S. Representative for Massachusetts's 5th congressional district, eventually becoming his chief of staff.

In 2005, she left the public sector to work for ChoiceStream, a Cambridge, Massachusetts based marketing software company. She became the CEO of the Concire Leadership Institute, a small, female-owned consulting firm.

In 2018, she returned to public service after winning the 2018 US House of Representatives election in Massachusetts' 3rd district.

== U.S. House of Representatives ==
=== Elections ===
==== 2018 ====
In October 2017, Trahan announced her candidacy for the 2018 election to succeed retiring U.S. representative Niki Tsongas. Tsongas succeeded Representative Jim McGovern, in what was formerly the 2nd district in the state, and would later become the 3rd district. McGovern continues to serve in the 2nd district.

In September 2018, Trahan won the Democratic primary election, the key race in the heavily Democratic district. She narrowly defeating Daniel Koh, the former chief of staff to Boston mayor Marty Walsh, in a field of ten candidates. The victory was upheld after a recount. In the November general election, Trahan defeated the Republican nominee, Rick Green, with 62% of the vote.

==== 2020 ====
Trahan was reelected with 97% of the vote in 2020, running unopposed.

==== 2022 ====
In 2022, Trahan was reelected with 63.6% of the vote, defeating Republican challenger Dean Tran.

==== 2024 ====
In 2024, Trahan was reelected unopposed with 97.5% of the vote.

==== 2026 ====
In 2026, Trahan advanced through the Democratic party primary as an uncontested candidate. She will run in the November general election against Republican candidate Gary J. Grossi and an independent, Kevin Ades.

=== Tenure ===
==== Campaign finance investigation ====
On March 4, 2019, The Boston Globe published an analysis of contributions to Trahan's campaign in the weeks before the 3rd congressional district's 2018 Democratic primary. In the last days before the primary, Trahan put hundreds of thousands of dollars into TV advertising, and the Globe investigated the source of the money. Trahan told the Globe she used $371,000 in personal funds, but federal financial disclosures she filed in the late summer of 2018 appeared to show that she did not have the funds to cover such a loan.

On December 17, 2019, the United States House Committee on Ethics launched a continuing investigation of Trahan after congressional investigators found "substantial reason to believe" that she violated campaign finance laws in her 2018 campaign. The Ethics Committee voted unanimously to dismiss the inquiry on July 15, 2020, saying in its final report that it "did not find that Representative Trahan acted in violation of House Rules, laws, regulations, or other standards of conduct."

=== Committee assignments ===
- Committee on Energy and Commerce
  - Subcommittee on Health
  - Subcommittee on Innovation, Data, and Commerce

=== Caucus memberships ===
- Black Maternal Health Caucus
- Congressional Asian Pacific American Caucus
- Congressional Hispanic Caucus
- Congressional Progressive Caucus
- Congressional Equality Caucus
- Congressional Ukraine Caucus
- Congressional Taiwan Caucus
- New Democrat Coalition
- Congressional Caucus for the Equal Rights Amendment
- Rare Disease Caucus

== Electoral history ==
Massachusetts' 3rd congressional district Democratic primary, 2018
Party	Candidate	Votes	%
Democratic	Lori Trahan	18,527	21.6
Democratic	Daniel Koh	18,405	21.5
Democratic	Barbara L'Italien	13,029	15.2
Democratic	Juana Matias	12,982	15.1
Democratic	Rufus Gifford	12,856	15.1
Democratic	Alexandra Chandler	4,848	5.7
Democratic	Beej Das	1,496	1.7
Democratic	Jeffrey Ballinger	1,388	1.6
Democratic	Bopha Malone	1,344	1.6
Democratic	Leonard Golder	585	0.7
Democratic	write-ins	131	0.2
Democratic	Blanks	3,227	
Total votes		88,818	100.0

Massachusetts' 3rd congressional district, 2018
Party	Candidate	Votes	%
Democratic	Lori Trahan	173,175	62.0
Republican	Rick Green	93,445	33.4
Independent	Mike Mullen	12,572	4.5
n/a	Write-ins	135	0.1
Total votes		279,327	100.0
Democratic hold			

Massachusetts' 3rd congressional district, 2020
Party	Candidate	Votes	%
Democratic	Lori Trahan	286,896	97.7
n/a	Write-ins	6,643	2.7
Total votes		293,539	100.0
Democratic hold			

Massachusetts' 3rd congressional district, 2022
Party	Candidate	Votes	%
Democratic	Lori Trahan (incumbent)	154,496	63.5
Republican	Dean Tran	88,585	36.4
Write-in		220	0.1
Total votes		243,301	100.0
Democratic hold			

Massachusetts' 3rd congressional district, 2024
Party	Candidate	Votes	%
Democratic	Lori Trahan	264,968	97.5
n/a	Write-ins	6,861	2.5
Total votes		271,559	100.0
Democratic hold			

== Political positions ==
Congresswoman Trahan holds primarily progressive positions, and aligns strongly with the Democratic party voting bloc in Congress. She regularly supports progressive social issues, and was awarded a 1% Lifetime Score by the Heritage Action fund, a conservative advocacy organization. She voted with President Joe Biden's stated position 100% of the time in the 117th Congress, according to a FiveThirtyEight analysis.

In April 2019, Trahan supported the presidential candidacy of Senator Elizabeth Warren.

In an April 2019 interview, Trahan said she did not support the impeachment of President Trump, but that Congress should continue investigating Trump. In December 2019, after the revelation that Trump had spoken to Ukrainian president Volodymyr Zelenskyy about investigating his rival Joe Biden, Trahan told The Salem News that she supported impeaching the president, calling Trump's abuses in office a "clear and present danger" that required action. On December 19, 2019, Trahan voted for both articles of impeachment against Trump.

On March 28, 2019, Trahan voted to protect transgender troops from the Trump Administration's ban on transgender people serving in the military.

In October 2022, Trahan introduced the Stop Online Suicide Assistance Forums Act, a bill that would make it a crime to use "the mail or interstate communication to intentionally assist another individual in taking that individual's own life". The bill was a bipartisan effort that included representatives Chris Stewart, Mike Carey and Katie Porter.

In January 2023, Trahan was one of 13 cosponsors of an amendment to the Constitution of the United States extending the right to vote to citizens sixteen years of age or older.

=== Environment ===
As of September 2026, Trahan received a score of 97% by the League of Conservation Voters for her votes on environment and climate bills during her tenure. In 2023 she received a 100% score awarded by the Environmental League of Massachusetts Action Fund. She has voted in favor of a majority of pro-environmental bills, with the exception of bills related to increased environmental regulation or evaluation of data centers and their construction. On February 7, 2019, Trahan became an original cosponsor of the Green New Deal. In 2020, she voted to support amendment H.R. 7608, which proposed funding cuts to the EPA. The amendment eventually failed to pass in the House.

=== Foreign policy ===
On October 1, 2020, Trahan co-signed a letter to Secretary of State Mike Pompeo condemning Azerbaijan’s offensive operations against the Armenian-populated enclave of Nagorno-Karabakh and denounced Turkey’s role in the Nagorno-Karabakh conflict, and criticized "false equivalence between Armenia and Azerbaijan, even as the latter threatens war and refuses to agree to monitoring along the line of contact."

In 2023, Trahan was among 56 Democrats to vote in favor of H.Con.Res. 21, which directed President Joe Biden to remove U.S. troops from Syria within 180 days.

In 2023, Trahan was among 49 Democrats to break with President Joe Biden, by voting for a ban on cluster munitions to Ukraine.

=== Artificial intelligence ===
Trahan has led a Democratic party push to regulate artificial intelligence, alongside Representative Jay Obernolte and several other representatives as a bipartisan coalition. The Frontier Risk Oversight, National Transparency, Independent Evaluation, and Reporting Act, or the FRONTIER Act, as the bill is known, supports independent verification of AI safety protocols on different models, and creates a new Under Security for Commerce focused on AI safety risk. She is not in favor of a permanent ban or moratorium on AI super-intelligence, as outlined in a rival bill by Senator Bernie Sanders, but she supports increased regulation.

== Personal life ==
Trahan lives in Westford, Massachusetts, with her two daughters, three stepsons, and husband Dave. Trahan is Roman Catholic.

== See also ==
- Women in the United States House of Representatives
- US Congressional representatives from Massachusetts
- List of current United States representatives

U.S. House of Representatives
Preceded by Niki Tsongas	Member of the U.S. House of Representatives from Massachusetts's 3rd congressional district 2019–present	Incumbent
U.S. order of precedence (ceremonial)
Preceded by Rashida Tlaib	United States representatives by seniority 232nd	Succeeded by Lauren Underwood
