= List of cities in New England by population =

Historical population
| Year | Pop. | ±% |
|---|---|---|
| 1790 | 1,009,408 | — |
| 1800 | 1,233,011 | +22.2% |
| 1810 | 1,471,973 | +19.4% |
| 1820 | 1,660,065 | +12.8% |
| 1830 | 1,954,717 | +17.7% |
| 1840 | 2,234,822 | +14.3% |
| 1850 | 2,728,116 | +22.1% |
| 1860 | 3,135,283 | +14.9% |
| 1870 | 3,487,924 | +11.2% |
| 1880 | 4,010,529 | +15.0% |
| 1890 | 4,700,749 | +17.2% |
| 1900 | 5,592,017 | +19.0% |
| 1910 | 6,552,681 | +17.2% |
| 1920 | 7,400,909 | +12.9% |
| 1930 | 8,166,341 | +10.3% |
| 1940 | 8,437,290 | +3.3% |
| 1950 | 9,314,453 | +10.4% |
| 1960 | 10,509,367 | +12.8% |
| 1970 | 11,841,663 | +12.7% |
| 1980 | 12,348,493 | +4.3% |
| 1990 | 13,206,943 | +7.0% |
| 2000 | 13,922,517 | +5.4% |
| 2010 | 14,444,865 | +3.8% |
| 2020 | 15,116,205 | +4.6% |
2010-2020; 1800-2000

This is a list of the cities and towns in New England with population over 25,000 as of the 2020 census. Massachusetts contains the most cities and towns on the list with 80, while Vermont contains the fewest with just one. Neither Vermont's (Montpelier) nor Maine's (Augusta) state capitals fall within the top 150 by population.

== List ==
The table below contains the following information:

1. The city rank by population as of 2020
2. The name of the state in which the city lies
3. Population as of April 1, 2020, as counted by the 2020 United States Census
4. Population as of April 1, 2010, according to the 2010 United States census
5. Percent change in population from April 1, 2010, to April 1, 2020

State capital
State largest city

| Rank | Name | State | Population (2020) | Population (2010) | Change |
|---|---|---|---|---|---|
| 1. | Boston | Massachusetts | 675,647 | 617,594 | +9.40% |
| 2. | Worcester | Massachusetts | 206,518 | 181,045 | +14.07% |
| 3. | Providence | Rhode Island | 190,934 | 178,042 | +7.24% |
| 4. | Springfield | Massachusetts | 155,929 | 153,060 | +1.87% |
| 5. | Bridgeport | Connecticut | 148,654 | 144,229 | +3.07% |
| 6. | Stamford | Connecticut | 135,470 | 122,643 | +10.46% |
| 7. | New Haven | Connecticut | 134,023 | 129,779 | +3.27% |
| 8. | Hartford | Connecticut | 121,054 | 124,775 | −2.98% |
| 9. | Cambridge | Massachusetts | 118,403 | 105,162 | +12.59% |
| 10. | Manchester | New Hampshire | 115,644 | 109,565 | +5.55% |
| 11. | Lowell | Massachusetts | 115,554 | 106,519 | +8.48% |
| 12. | Waterbury | Connecticut | 114,403 | 110,366 | +3.66% |
| 13. | Brockton | Massachusetts | 105,643 | 93,810 | +12.61% |
| 14. | Quincy | Massachusetts | 101,636 | 92,271 | +10.15% |
| 15. | Lynn | Massachusetts | 101,253 | 90,329 | +12.09% |
| 16. | New Bedford | Massachusetts | 101,079 | 95,072 | +6.32% |
| 17. | Fall River | Massachusetts | 94,000 | 88,857 | +5.79% |
| 18. | Nashua | New Hampshire | 91,322 | 86,494 | +5.58% |
| 19. | Norwalk | Connecticut | 91,184 | 85,603 | +6.52% |
| 20. | Lawrence | Massachusetts | 89,143 | 76,377 | +16.71% |
| 21. | Newton | Massachusetts | 88,923 | 85,146 | +4.44% |
| 22. | Danbury | Connecticut | 86,518 | 80,893 | +6.95% |
| 23. | Cranston | Rhode Island | 82,934 | 80,387 | +3.17% |
| 24. | Warwick | Rhode Island | 82,823 | 82,672 | +0.18% |
| 25. | Somerville | Massachusetts | 81,045 | 75,754 | +6.98% |
| 26. | Pawtucket | Rhode Island | 75,604 | 71,148 | +6.26% |
| 27. | New Britain | Connecticut | 74,135 | 73,206 | +1.27% |
| 28. | Framingham | Massachusetts | 72,362 | 68,318 | +5.92% |
| 29. | Portland | Maine | 68,408 | 66,194 | +3.34% |
| 30. | Haverhill | Massachusetts | 67,787 | 60,879 | +11.35% |
| 31. | Malden | Massachusetts | 66,263 | 59,450 | +11.46% |
| 32. | Waltham | Massachusetts | 65,218 | 60,632 | +7.56% |
| 33. | West Hartford | Connecticut | 64,083 | 63,268 | +1.29% |
| 34. | Greenwich | Connecticut | 63,518 | 61,171 | +3.84% |
| 35. | Brookline | Massachusetts | 63,191 | 58,732 | +7.59% |
| 36. | Revere | Massachusetts | 62,186 | 51,755 | +20.15% |
| 37. | Fairfield | Connecticut | 61,512 | 59,404 | +3.55% |
| 38. | Plymouth | Massachusetts | 61,217 | 56,468 | +8.41% |
| 39. | Hamden | Connecticut | 61,169 | 60,960 | +0.34% |
| 40. | Meriden | Connecticut | 60,850 | 60,868 | −0.03% |
| 41. | Bristol | Connecticut | 60,833 | 60,477 | +0.59% |
| 42. | Medford | Massachusetts | 59,659 | 56,173 | +6.21% |
| 43. | Manchester | Connecticut | 59,713 | 58,241 | +2.53% |
| 44. | Taunton | Massachusetts | 59,408 | 55,874 | +6.32% |
| 45. | Weymouth | Massachusetts | 57,437 | 53,743 | +6.87% |
| 46. | West Haven | Connecticut | 55,584 | 55,564 | +0.04% |
| 47. | Chicopee | Massachusetts | 55,560 | 55,298 | +0.47% |
| 48. | Peabody | Massachusetts | 54,481 | 51,251 | +6.30% |
| 49. | Methuen | Massachusetts | 53,059 | 47,255 | +12.28% |
| 50. | Stratford | Connecticut | 52,355 | 51,384 | +1.89% |
| 51. | East Hartford | Connecticut | 51,045 | 51,252 | −0.40% |
| 52. | Milford | Connecticut | 50,558 | 52,759 | −4.17% |
| 53. | Everett | Massachusetts | 49,075 | 41,667 | +17.78% |
| 54. | Barnstable | Massachusetts | 48,916 | 45,193 | +8.24% |
| 55. | Middletown | Connecticut | 47,717 | 47,648 | +0.14% |
| 56. | East Providence | Rhode Island | 47,139 | 47,037 | +0.22% |
| 57. | Attleboro | Massachusetts | 46,461 | 43,593 | +6.58% |
| 58. | Arlington | Massachusetts | 46,308 | 42,844 | +8.09% |
| 59. | Burlington | Vermont | 44,743 | 42,417 | +5.48% |
| 60. | Salem | Massachusetts | 44,480 | 41,340 | +7.60% |
| 61. | Wallingford | Connecticut | 44,396 | 45,135 | −1.64% |
| 62. | Concord | New Hampshire | 43,976 | 42,695 | +3.00% |
| 63. | Pittsfield | Massachusetts | 43,927 | 44,737 | −1.81% |
| 64. | Leominster | Massachusetts | 43,782 | 40,759 | +7.42% |
| 65. | Southington | Connecticut | 43,501 | 43,069 | +1.00% |
| 66. | Woonsocket | Rhode Island | 43,240 | 41,186 | +4.99% |
| 67. | Beverly | Massachusetts | 42,670 | 39,502 | +8.02% |
| 68. | Enfield | Connecticut | 42,141 | 44,654 | −5.63% |
| 69. | Billerica | Massachusetts | 42,119 | 40,243 | +4.66% |
| 70. | Fitchburg | Massachusetts | 41,946 | 40,318 | +4.04% |
| 71. | Marlborough | Massachusetts | 41,793 | 38,499 | +8.56% |
| 72. | Woburn | Massachusetts | 40,876 | 38,120 | +7.23% |
| 73. | Shelton | Connecticut | 40,869 | 39,559 | +3.31% |
| 74. | Westfield | Massachusetts | 40,834 | 41,094 | −0.63% |
| 75. | Chelsea | Massachusetts | 40,787 | 35,177 | +15.95% |
| 76. | Norwich | Connecticut | 40,125 | 40,493 | −0.91% |
| 77. | Groton | Connecticut | 38,411 | 40,115 | −4.25% |
| 78. | Amherst | Massachusetts | 39,263 | 37,819 | +3.82% |
| 79. | Braintree | Massachusetts | 39,143 | 35,744 | +9.51% |
| 80. | Shrewsbury | Massachusetts | 38,325 | 35,608 | +7.63% |
| 81. | Holyoke | Massachusetts | 38,238 | 39,880 | −4.12% |
| 82. | Lewiston | Maine | 37,121 | 36,592 | +1.45% |
| 83. | Natick | Massachusetts | 37,006 | 33,006 | +12.12% |
| 84. | Trumbull | Connecticut | 36,827 | 36,018 | +2.25% |
| 85. | Andover | Massachusetts | 36,569 | 33,201 | +10.14% |
| 86. | Cumberland | Rhode Island | 36,405 | 33,506 | +8.65% |
| 87. | Chelmsford | Massachusetts | 36,392 | 33,802 | +7.66% |
| 88. | Coventry | Rhode Island | 35,688 | 35,014 | +1.92% |
| 89. | Torrington | Connecticut | 35,515 | 36,383 | −2.39% |
| 90. | Watertown | Massachusetts | 35,329 | 31,915 | +10.70% |
| 91. | Glastonbury | Connecticut | 35,159 | 34,427 | +2.13% |
| 92. | Randolph | Massachusetts | 34,984 | 32,158 | +8.79% |
| 93. | Lexington | Massachusetts | 34,454 | 31,394 | +9.75% |
| 94. | Derry | New Hampshire | 34,317 | 33,109 | +3.65% |
| 95. | North Providence | Rhode Island | 34,114 | 32,078 | +6.35% |
| 96. | Dartmouth | Massachusetts | 33,783 | 34,032 | −0.73% |
| 97. | Franklin | Massachusetts | 33,261 | 31,635 | +5.14% |
| 98. | Dover | New Hampshire | 32,741 | 29,987 | +9.18% |
| 99. | Dracut | Massachusetts | 32,617 | 29,457 | +10.73% |
| 100. | Falmouth | Massachusetts | 32,517 | 31,531 | +3.13% |
| 101. | Rochester | New Hampshire | 32,492 | 29,752 | +9.21% |
| 102. | Needham | Massachusetts | 32,091 | 28,886 | +11.10% |
| 103. | South Kingstown | Rhode Island | 31,931 | 30,639 | +4.22% |
| 104. | Bangor | Maine | 31,753 | 33,039 | −3.89% |
| 105. | Norwood | Massachusetts | 31,611 | 28,602 | +10.52% |
| 106. | Naugatuck | Connecticut | 31,519 | 31,862 | −1.08% |
| 107. | Tewksbury | Massachusetts | 31,342 | 28,961 | +8.22% |
| 108. | West Warwick | Rhode Island | 31,012 | 29,191 | +6.24% |
| 109. | North Andover | Massachusetts | 30,915 | 28,352 | +9.04% |
| 110. | North Attleborough | Massachusetts | 30,834 | 28,712 | +7.39% |
| 111. | Newington | Connecticut | 30,536 | 30,562 | −0.09% |
| 112. | Milford | Massachusetts | 30,379 | 27,999 | +8.50% |
| 113. | Vernon | Connecticut | 30,215 | 29,179 | +3.55% |
| 114. | Salem | New Hampshire | 30,089 | 28,776 | +4.56% |
| 115. | Melrose | Massachusetts | 29,817 | 26,983 | +10.50% |
| 116. | Gloucester | Massachusetts | 29,729 | 28,789 | +3.27% |
| 117. | Northampton | Massachusetts | 29,571 | 28,549 | +3.58% |
| 118. | Johnston | Rhode Island | 29,568 | 28,769 | +2.78% |
| 119. | Wellesley | Massachusetts | 29,550 | 27,982 | +5.60% |
| 120. | Windsor | Connecticut | 29,492 | 29,044 | +1.54% |
| 121. | Stoughton | Massachusetts | 29,281 | 26,962 | +8.60% |
| 122. | West Springfield | Massachusetts | 28,835 | 28,391 | +1.56% |
| 123. | Cheshire | Connecticut | 28,733 | 29,261 | −1.80% |
| 124. | Agawam | Massachusetts | 28,692 | 28,438 | +0.89% |
| 125. | Bridgewater | Massachusetts | 28,633 | 26,563 | +7.79% |
| 126. | Milton | Massachusetts | 28,630 | 27,003 | +6.03% |
| 127. | Saugus | Massachusetts | 28,619 | 26,628 | +7.48% |
| 128. | Branford | Connecticut | 28,273 | 28,026 | +0.88% |
| 129. | New Milford | Connecticut | 28,115 | 28,142 | −0.10% |
| 130. | Danvers | Massachusetts | 28,087 | 26,493 | +6.02% |
| 131. | East Haven | Connecticut | 27,923 | 29,257 | −4.56% |
| 132. | North Kingstown | Rhode Island | 27,732 | 26,486 | +4.70% |
| 133. | New London | Connecticut | 27,367 | 27,620 | −0.92% |
| 134. | Wethersfield | Connecticut | 27,298 | 26,668 | +2.36% |
| 135. | Belmont | Massachusetts | 27,295 | 24,729 | +10.38% |
| 136. | Newtown | Connecticut | 27,173 | 27,560 | −1.40% |
| 137. | Westport | Connecticut | 27,141 | 26,391 | +2.84% |
| 138. | Wakefield | Massachusetts | 27,090 | 24,932 | +8.66% |
| 139. | South Windsor | Connecticut | 26,918 | 25,709 | +4.70% |
| 140. | Farmington | Connecticut | 26,712 | 25,340 | +5.41% |
| 141. | Merrimack | New Hampshire | 26,632 | 25,494 | +4.46% |
| 142. | South Portland | Maine | 26,498 | 25,002 | +5.98% |
| 143. | Walpole | Massachusetts | 26,383 | 24,070 | +9.61% |
| 144. | Burlington | Massachusetts | 26,377 | 24,498 | +7.67% |
| 145. | Mansfield | Connecticut | 25,892 | 26,543 | −2.45% |
| 146. | Londonderry | New Hampshire | 25,826 | 24,129 | +7.03% |
| 147. | Marshfield | Massachusetts | 25,825 | 25,132 | +2.76% |
| 148. | Reading | Massachusetts | 25,518 | 24,747 | +3.12% |
| 149. | Hudson | New Hampshire | 25,394 | 24,467 | +3.79% |
| 150. | Dedham | Massachusetts | 25,364 | 24,729 | +2.57% |
| 151. | Newport | Rhode Island | 25,163 | 24,672 | +1.99% |
| 152. | Easton | Massachusetts | 25,058 | 23,112 | +8.42% |
| 153. | Ridgefield | Connecticut | 25,033 | 24,638 | +1.60% |
| 154. | Yarmouth | Massachusetts | 25,023 | 23,793 | +5.17% |

== States with the most cities ==
New England states with the most cities and towns over 25,000 population as of April 1, 2020.

| Rank | State | ≥200,000 | 100,000-199,999 | 80,000-99,999 | 60,000-79,999 | 40,000-59,999 | 25,000-39,999 | Total |
|---|---|---|---|---|---|---|---|---|
| 1 | Massachusetts | 2 | 7 | 4 | 7 | 20 | 40 | 80 |
| 2 | Connecticut | 0 | 5 | 2 | 7 | 11 | 19 | 44 |
| 3 | Rhode Island | 0 | 1 | 2 | 1 | 2 | 8 | 14 |
| 4 | New Hampshire | 0 | 1 | 1 | 0 | 1 | 7 | 10 |
| 5 | Maine | 0 | 0 | 0 | 1 | 0 | 3 | 4 |
| 6 | Vermont | 0 | 0 | 0 | 0 | 1 | 0 | 1 |

== Gallery ==
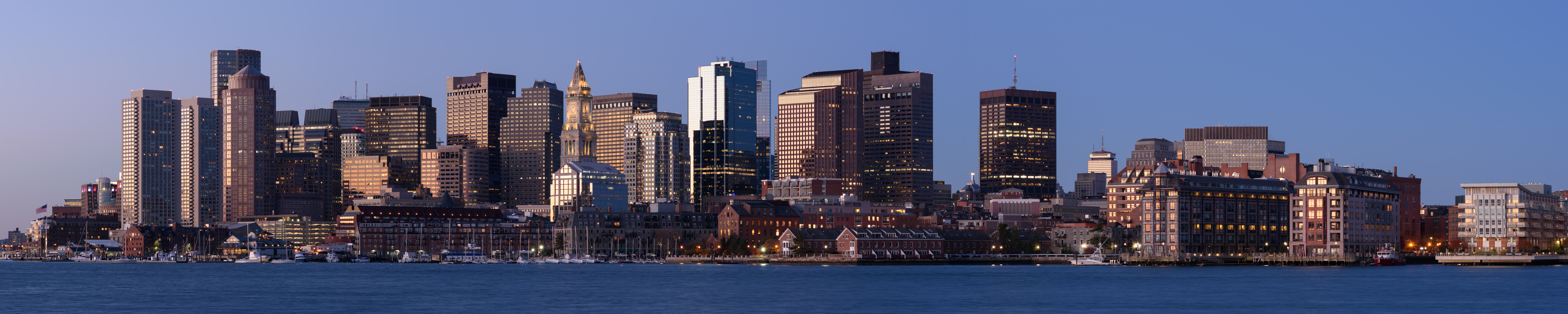
1. Boston, Massachusetts

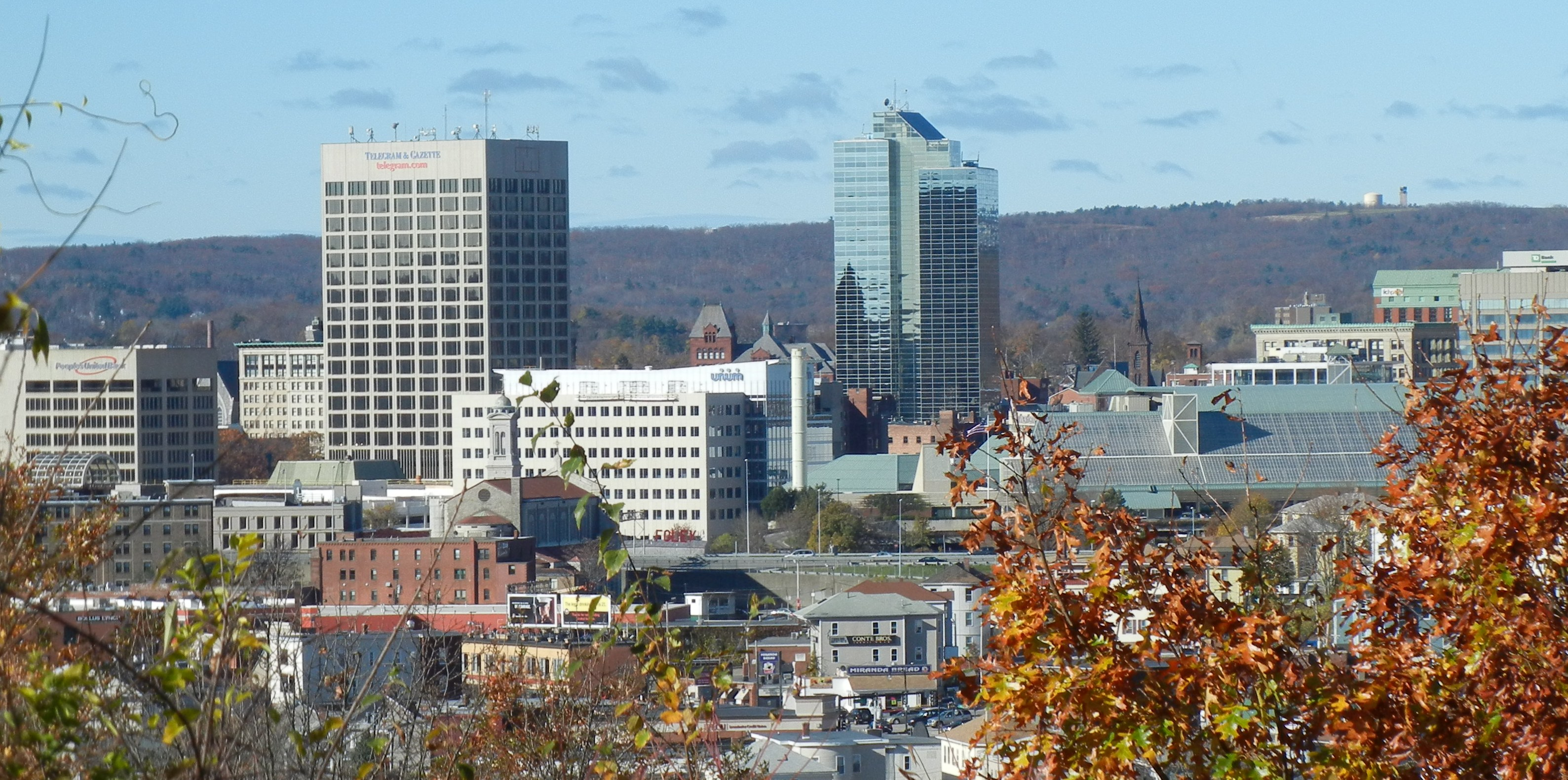
2. Worcester, Massachusetts

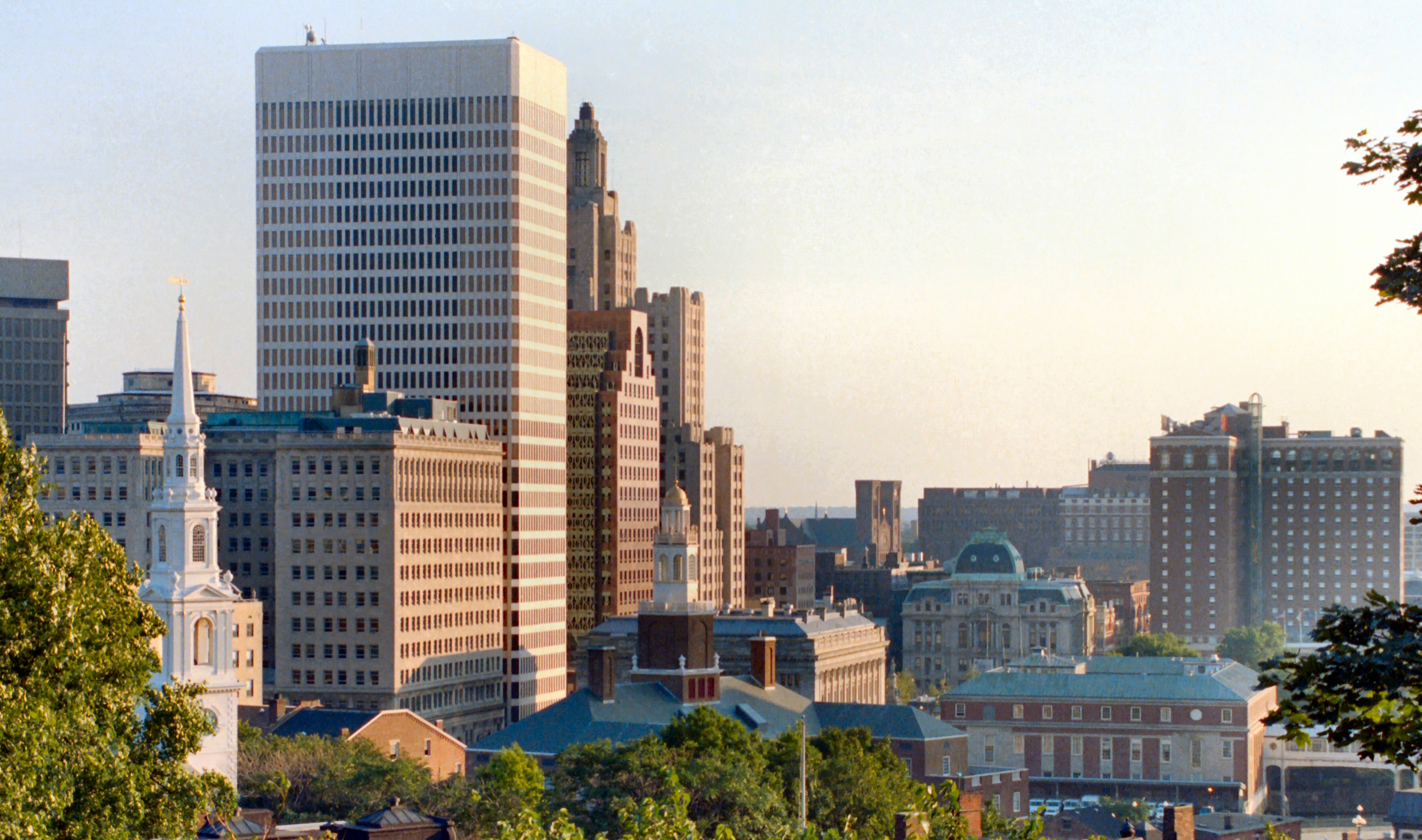
3. Providence, Rhode Island

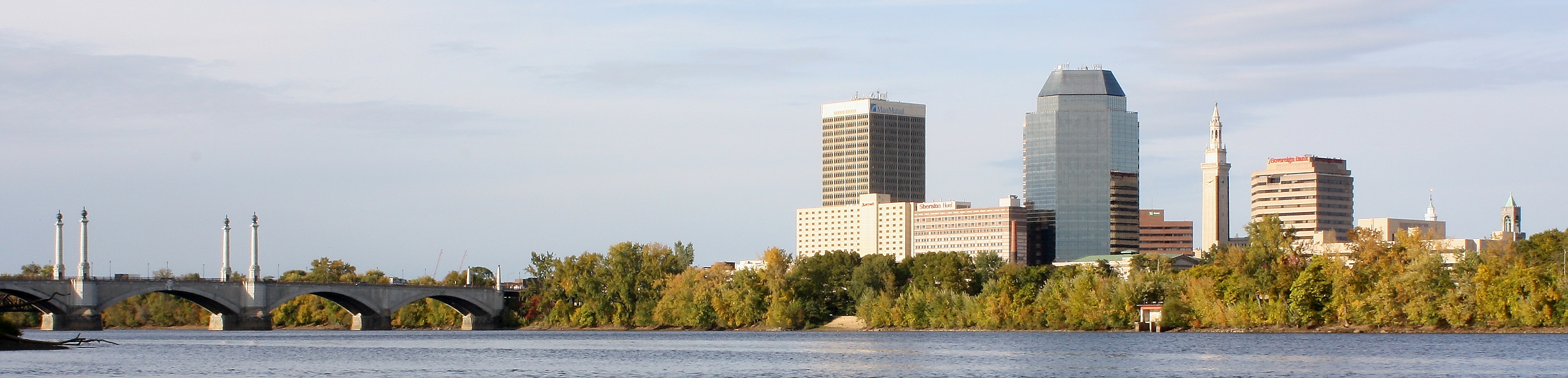
4. Springfield, Massachusetts

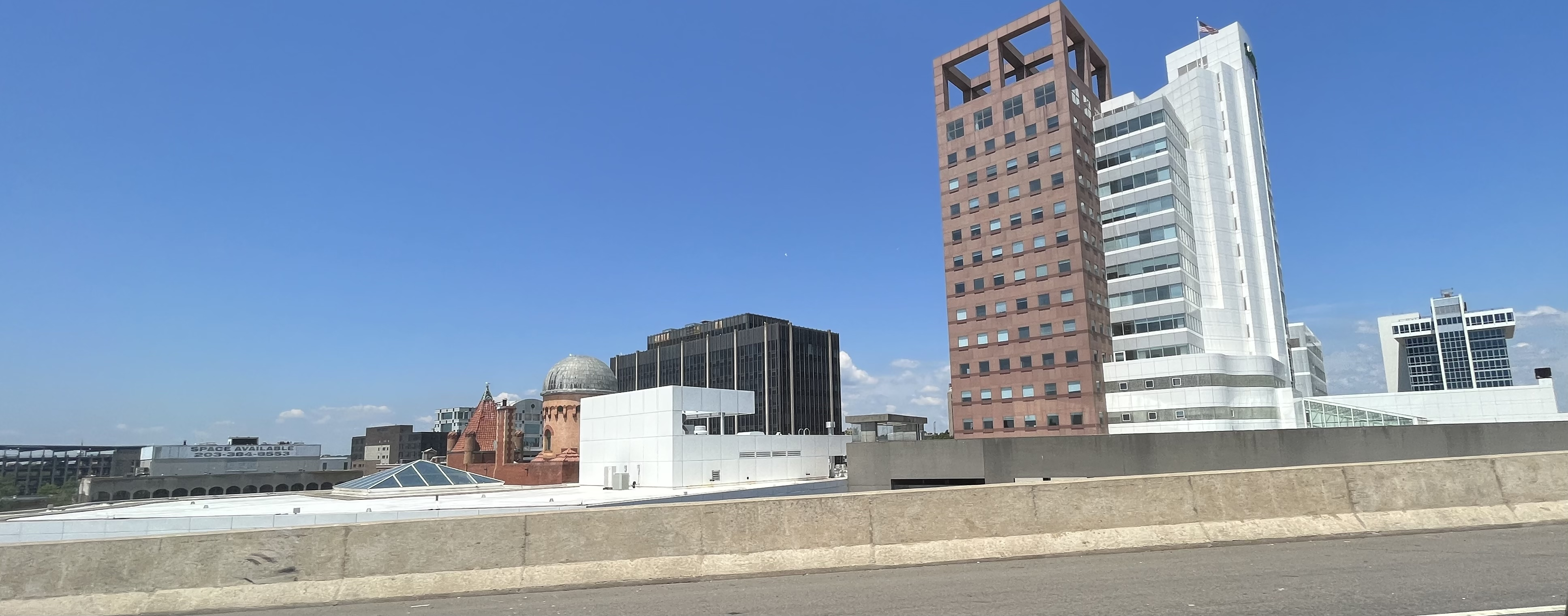
5. Bridgeport, Connecticut

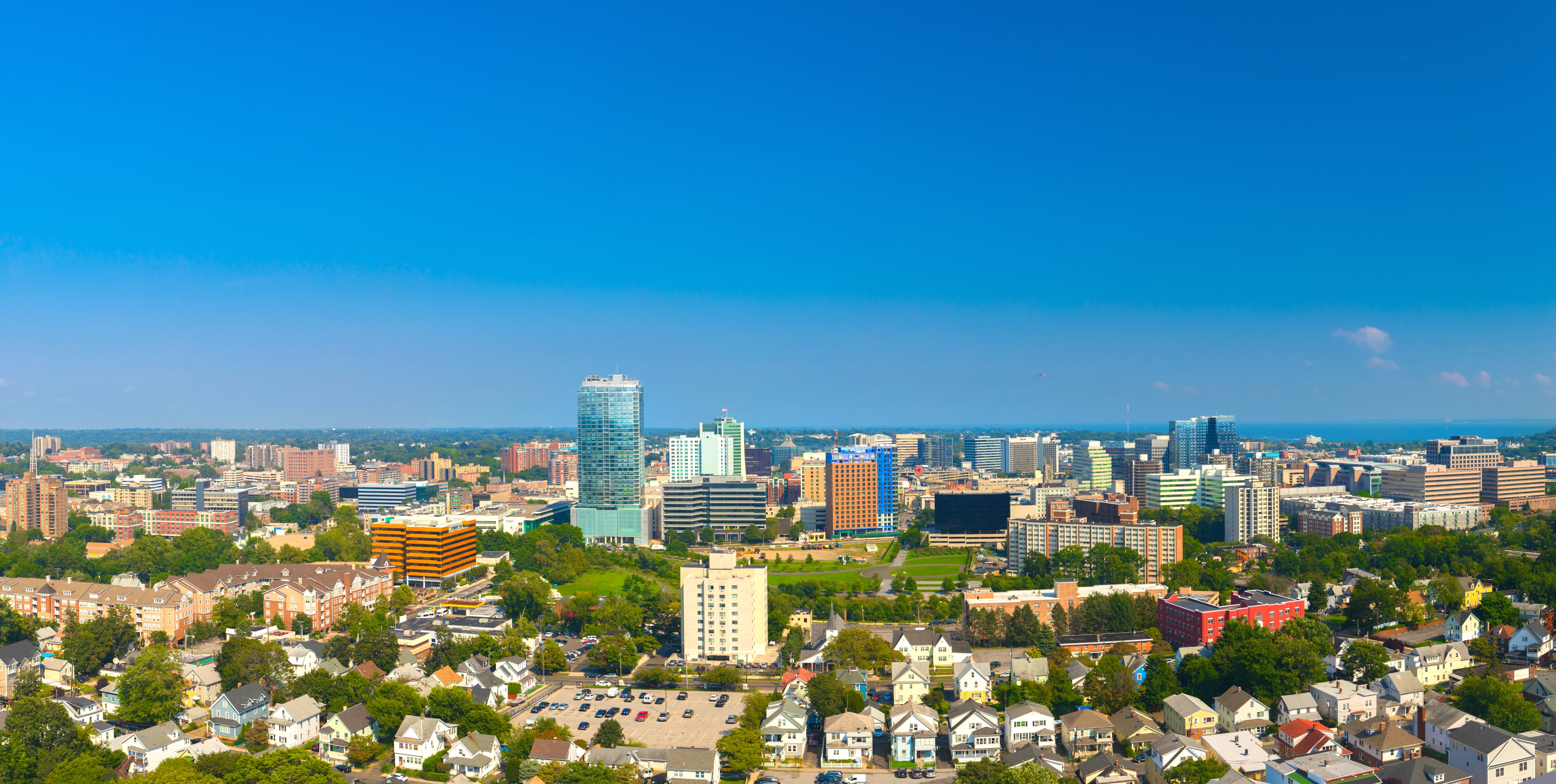
6. Stamford, Connecticut

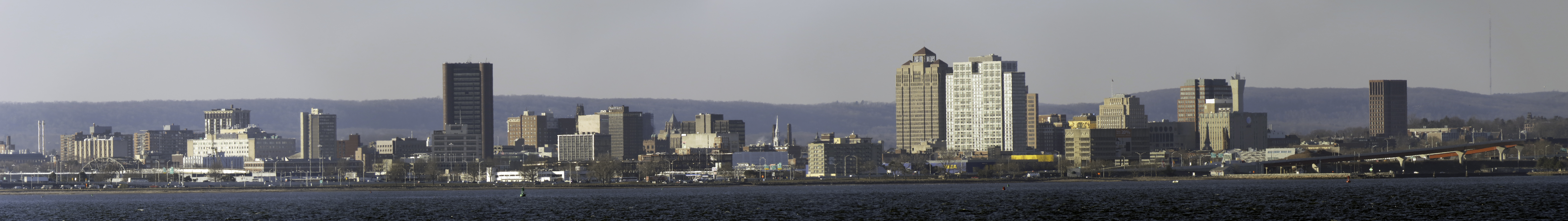
7. New Haven, Connecticut

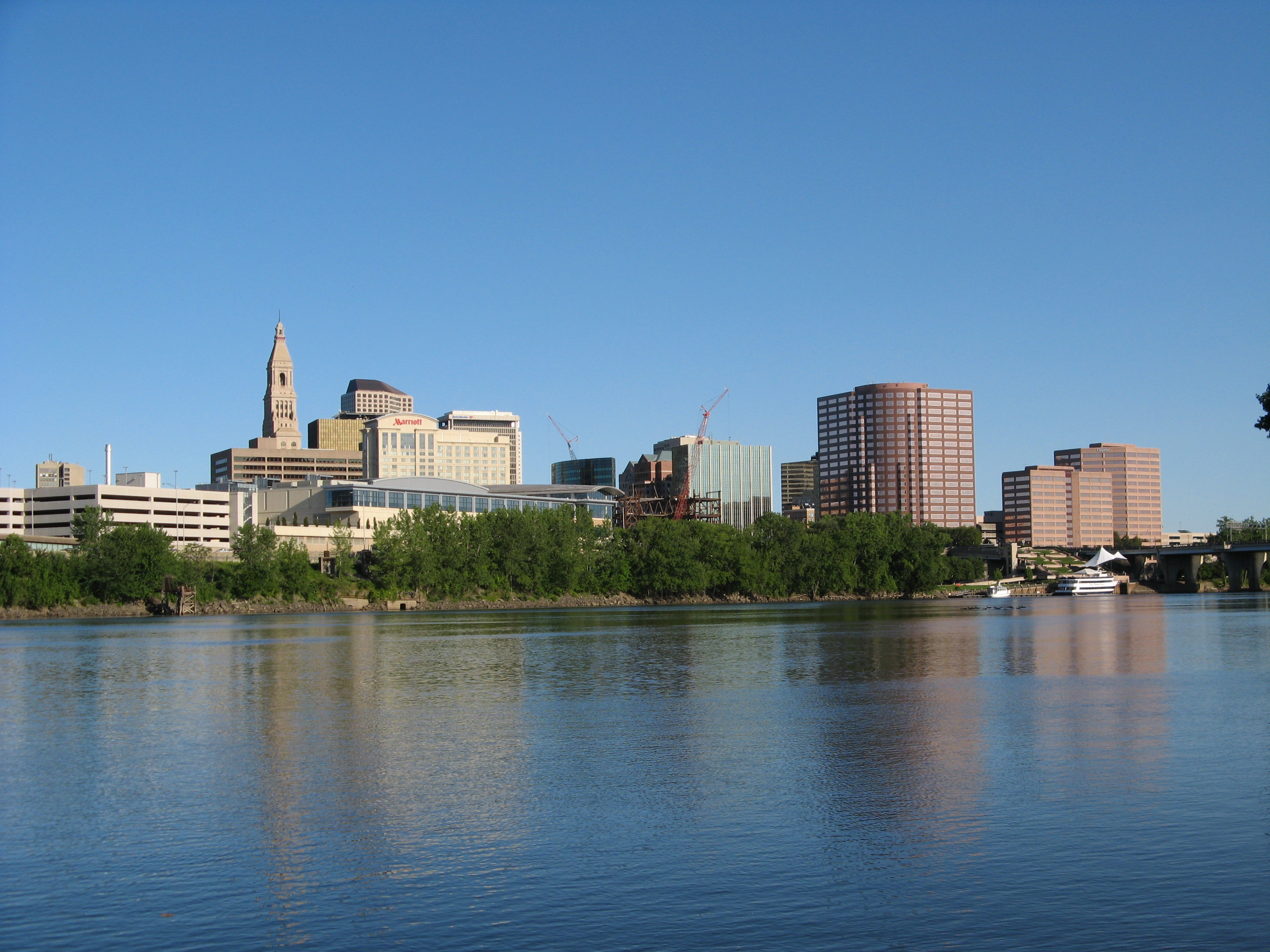
8. Hartford, Connecticut

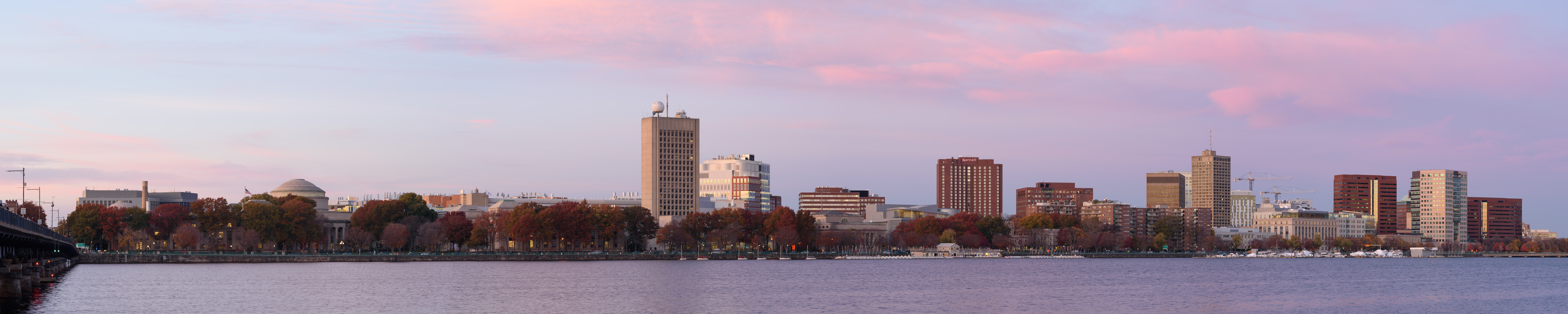
9. Cambridge, Massachusetts

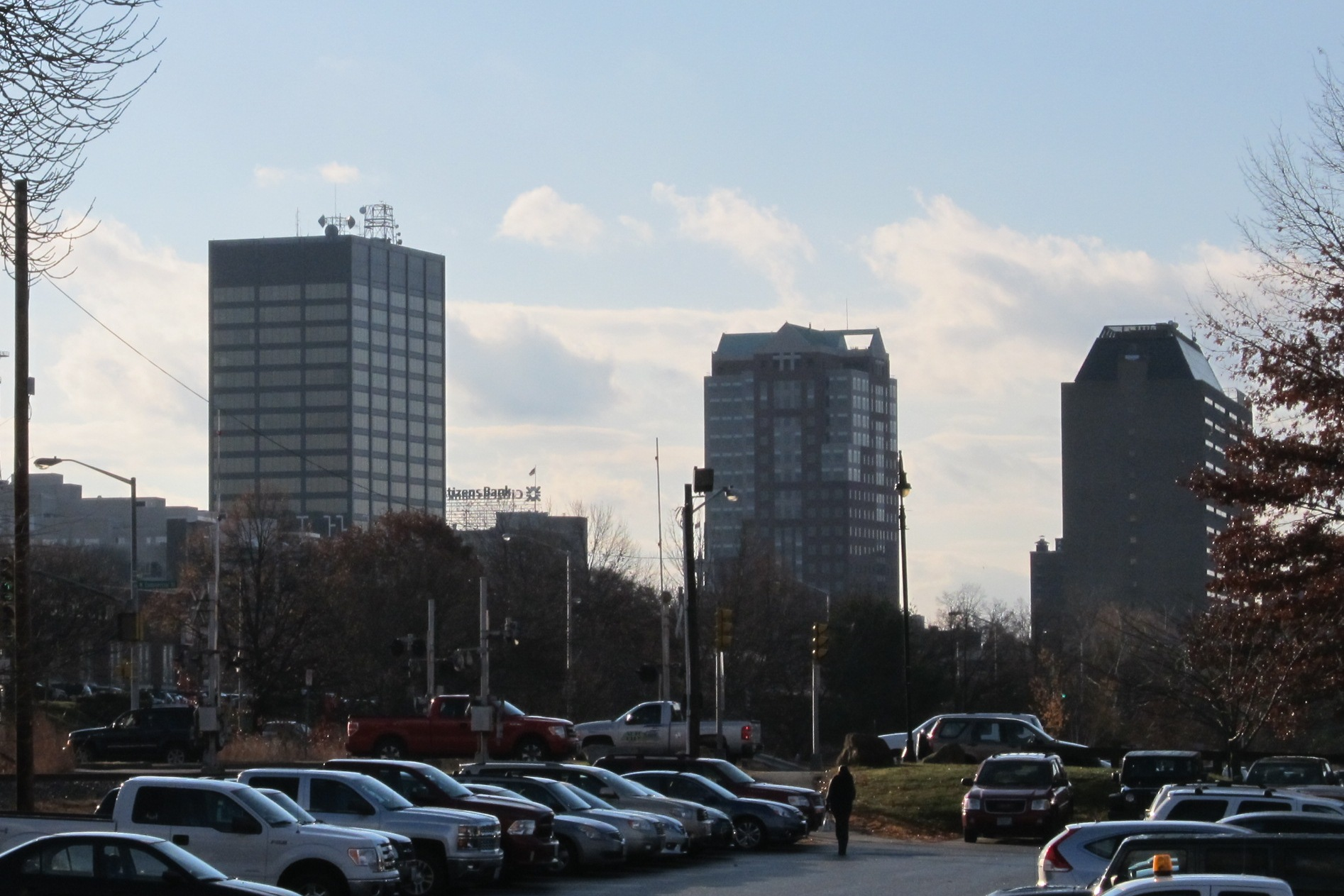
10. Manchester, New Hampshire

== See also ==
- List of United States cities by population
- List of largest cities of U.S. states and territories by population
- List of municipalities in Massachusetts
- List of towns in Connecticut
- List of municipalities in Rhode Island
- List of cities in Maine
- List of cities and towns in New Hampshire
- List of cities in Vermont
- United States
  - Outline of the United States
  - Index of United States–related articles
  - United States Census Bureau
    - Demographics of the United States
      - Urbanization in the United States
      - List of states and territories of the United States by population
      - List of United States cities by population
  - United States Office of Management and Budget
    - Statistical area (United States)
      - Combined statistical area (list)
      - Core-based statistical area (list)
        - Metropolitan statistical area (list)
        - Micropolitan statistical area (list)
- List of most populous cities in the United States by decade
- List of largest cities (most populous cities in the world)
- Lists of populated places in the United States
- List of United States cities by population density
- List of United States urban areas
