= Tedeschi Food Shops =

American convenience store chain

Tedeschi Food Shops, Inc.

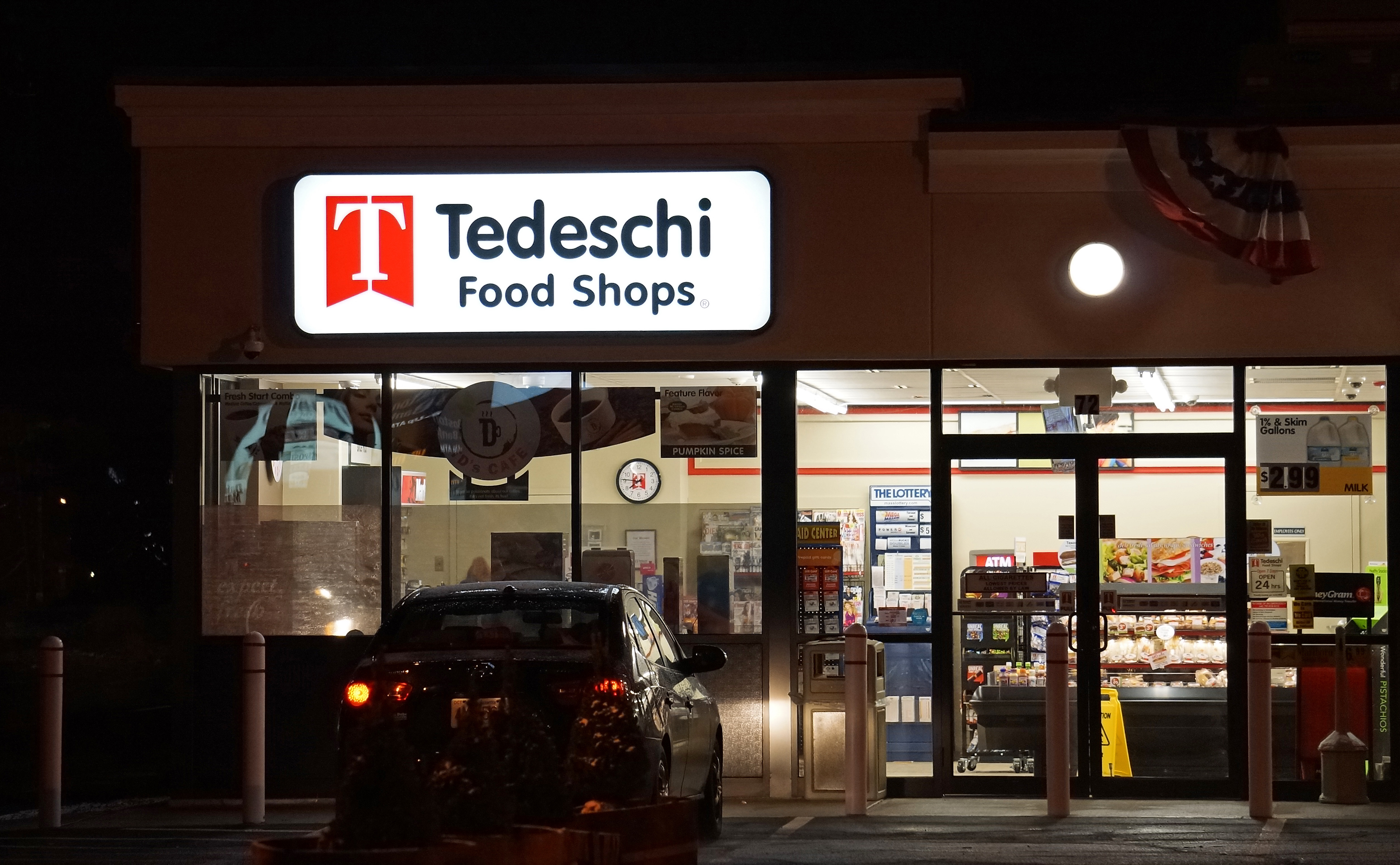
- Tedeschi Food Shop, Revere, Massachusetts
- Type: Wholly owned subsidiary
- Industry: Retail
- Founded: 1923; 103 years ago
- Defunct: 2015; 11 years ago
- Headquarters: Rockland, Massachusetts
- Key people: Peter Tedeschi, CEO
- Products: Convenience stores

Tedeschi Food Shops was a chain of nearly 200 convenience stores (as of March 2015), located primarily in Massachusetts, with some stores in New Hampshire. It was acquired by 7- Eleven in May 2015, and the transaction closed in August 2015. According to a spokesman for 7-Eleven, conversion of the Tedeschi-branded stores to the 7-Eleven banner will be gradual.

== History ==
Angelo Tedeschi (pronounced tuh-DESS-key), in 1923, opened a store in the basement of the family home in Rockland, Massachusetts. Since then, the Tedeschi family has been involved in the retail food industry, early on in the grocery store industry, and more recently in the convenience store industry. In 1972, the Tedeschi family acquired the Curtis Compacts chain of convenience stores, which was later renamed to Tedeschi Food Shops.

Tedeschi Food Shops acquired the Lil Peach chain in 1996 and the Store 24 chain in 2002.
