= Jeffrey Ballinger =

American labor organizer and author

- Born: March 21, 1953 (age 73)
- Occupations: Writer, editor, labor organizer
- Writing career
- Period: 1992–present (as writer and editor)
- Notable work: Behind the Swoosh
- Website: ballingerforcongress.com

Jeffrey Ballinger (born March 21, 1953) is an American labor organizer and writer, and is the founder of Press for Change, a labor group opposed to sweatshop practices. Ballinger is noted by The New York Times for having "exposed exploitation of factory workers in Asia." He is the editor of the book Behind the Swoosh.

Ballinger is a former Massachusetts candidate for the House of Representatives in the United States Congress.

== As writer and labor activist ==
Ballinger has worked overseas as a labor organizer with the American Federation of Labor and Congress of Industrial Organizations. He is a resident of Andover, Massachusetts.

He was the first writer to report in the media on unethical business practices by shoe and sports apparel manufacturer Nike in the early 1990s. In 1991 he published a critique of Nike's reliance on sub-minimum wages, child labor and bad workplace and labor organizing environment in Indonesia, and followed up with an article he authored for Harper's Magazine in 1992. In 1996 he conceded that investments in Indonesia may help lift workers from poverty but asked "why does the process have to be so brutal?"

Ballinger co-founded a non-governmental agency called Press for Change (not to be confused with another organization of the same name) that continued to focus attention on Nike's questionable business model, helping to bring an altered corporate approach from by the end of the 1990s. Ballinger stated to The New York Times that he believed Nike was on track to address the sweatshop issues that had led to criticism from figures such as Michael Moore and the comic strip Doonesbury. However, in 2005 he remained skeptical when Nike, in a reportedly unprecedented action, released a list of over 700 factories worldwide that manufactured Nike products.

He urged the Obama administration in 2009 to connect with labor activists in Asia and Central America, and recommended that the newly elected Democrats "look for empowering projects to assist workers directly in local struggles and, second, use survey-research tools to build a database available to local legal aid groups and labor activists."

In 2018, Ballinger wrote "Democrats have made little or no effort to explain how government helps and how laws protect us, leaving the door wide open for anti-government zealots like Bannon, Norquist, the Koch brothers, the Mercers and their ilk."

== 2018 Congressional candidate ==
In 2018 Ballinger became a Democratic candidate for the United States Congress. Running in Massachusetts's 3rd congressional district, he sought to replace the retiring Niki Tsongas, stating at the time of the announcement of his candidacy in February 2018 that he was "the only legit organizer in the field. I have a track record. I'm a muckraker... If [Democrats] get subpoena power, you need a guy like me to go through Trump's records." He joined others in pledging to support and vote for a three term-limit for House seats and two terms for Senate seats.

In late August 2017, the Boston Globe asked Ballard "when you talk to voters in the district, what's their most pressing concern, and why do you think you're the best person to address it in Congress?" Ballinger replied

Corporations have such a pervasive influence in Washington that people don't believe that elected representatives can really address the problems of the country. My skills as a corporate crime fighter organizer are key to rallying people to demand reform. Politicians won't get money out of Congress.

Ballinger was endorsed for the Congressional seat by Ralph Nader, who cited Ballinger's long history as a fighter of corporate crime.

== See also ==
- United States House of Representatives elections in Massachusetts, 2018
