= Kathryn T. Hall =

American medical researcher

Kathryn T. Hall (born 1964 in Oxford) is a leader in placebo research, Assistant professor of medicine part-time and molecular biologist who directs research or teaches at several institutions, including the following:

- Previously Deputy Commissioner of Population Health and Health Equity at Boston Public Health Commission.
- Currently, the Chief Public Health Officer of the City of Cambridge https://www.challiance.org/about-cha/newsroom/cha-newsroom/2026/10/dr-kathryn-hall-named-chief-public-health-officer-for-the-city-of-cambridge.
- Director of Basic and Translational Research at Osher Center for Integrative Medicine, at Brigham and Women's Hospital (BWH) and Harvard Medical School (HMS).
- Director of Placebo Genetics in the Program in Placebo Studies, Beth Israel Deaconess Medical Center.
- Assistant Professor of Medicine Part-time at Harvard Medical School (HMS).
- Associate Molecular Biologist in the Brigham and Women's Hospital: Division of Preventive Medicine.

She has published many papers and one book about the biological basis of the placebo effect. Hall's placebo research has been the subject of featured articles in The Atlantic, Science Magazine, The Economist, The New York Times and Discover magazine.

== Biography ==
Hall got her PhD in Microbiology and Molecular Genetics from Harvard University in 1996. Before returning to Harvard in 2010 she worked in biotech, first at Wyeth and then at Millennium Pharmaceuticals. In 2012 she joined the Fellowship in Integrative Medicine at Beth Israel Deaconess Medical Center (BIDMC) and then in 2014 got a MPH in Public Health from Harvard T. H. Chan School of Public Health.

She also has am MA in Documentary Film from Emerson College.

== Placebo research ==
Hall is a leader in placebo research. She asserts that, "The placebo effect is a real neurological response involving multiple parts of the brain." Noting that researchers have been using neuroimaging to see how the brain responds to placebos and that there are correlations between response and brain anatomy, she began to focus on genetics and its effect on brain structure.

Working with Ted J Kaptchuk, Hall investigated the neurotransmitter pathways in the brain that mediate placebo effects, and they found genetic markers that correlate with these pathways. This led the researchers to the idea of using genetic screening to identify placebo responders which in turn could improve patient care. She has also written about genetic markers in papers co-authored with Irving Kirsch and Paul M Ridker.

Hall has summarized her research in the 2022 book, Placebos.

== Selected papers ==
- Tori L. Cowger, Eleanor J. Murray, Jaylen Clarke, Mary T. Bassett, Bisola O. Ojikutu, Sarimer M. Sánchez, Natalia Linos, and Kathryn T. Hall. 'Lifting Universal Masking in Schools — Covid-19 Incidence among Students and Staff'. The New England Journal of Medicine, November 2022
- Hall KT, Loscalzo J, Kaptchuk TJ., 'Genetics and the Placebo effect: the placebome', Trends Mol Med., May 2015
- Hall KT, Lembo AJ, Kirsch I, et al., 'Catechol-O-methyltransferase val158met: Polymorphism Predicts Placebo Effect in Irritable Bowel Syndrome'. PLoS One, 2012
- Hall KT, Boumsell L, Schultze JL, et al., 'A Novel Leukocyte Semaphorin that Promotes B-cell Aggregation and Differentiation', Natl Acad Sci U S A., October 1996
