= Eleanor Murray =

British-Canadian Epidemiologist, science communicator

Eleanor J Murray
- Education: Harvard University; McGill University; Columbia University Mailman School of Public Health
- Scientific career
- Workplaces: Harvard T.H. Chan School of Public Health; Boston University School of Public Health; Faculty of Medicine, University of British Columbia
- Thesis: Agent-Based Models for Causal Inference (2016)

Eleanor (Ellie) Jane Murray is a British-Canadian epidemiologist, science communicator, and assistant professor in the Department of Anesthesiology, Pharmacology, and Therapeutics of Faculty of Medicine and Therapeutics Initiative at University of British Columbia. Throughout the COVID-19 pandemic, Murray created a series of multilingual, accessible infographics to communicate information about COVID-19.

== Early life and education ==
Murray earned a bachelor's degree in biology from McGill University. She later earned a master's degree in public health from Columbia University Mailman School of Public Health and conducted graduate research at Harvard University. She has also earned a ScD in epidemiology, an MSc in biostatistics and, in 2016, earned a doctorate of science from Harvard University. Murray studied the use of agent-based models in clinical decision making. Her research considered causal inference as a means to improve evidence-based decision making in clinical medicine.

== Research and career ==
In 2019, Murray became an assistant professor at Boston University, where she conducts research on a variety of medical conditions, including HIV, cancer and cardiovascular disease. Murray became known for her use of social media, where she shares complex epidemiological concepts using Twitter threads and GIFs.

During the COVID-19 pandemic, Murray partnered with Benjamin Linas to create a series of infographic resources on the pandemic for the general public. She argued that public health professionals should use the attention they received during the COVID-19 pandemic to help people understand the work of epidemiologists. She was interviewed by various media outlets, explaining concepts such as herd immunity, social distancing, and how to travel safely in a post-pandemic world.

== Selected publications ==
Pomaki, Georgia; Franche, Renée-Louise; Murray, Eleanor; Khushrushahi, Noushin; Lampinen, Thomas M. (June 2012). "Workplace-Based Work Disability Prevention Interventions for Workers with Common Mental Health Conditions: A Review of the Literature". Journal of Occupational Rehabilitation. 22 (2): 182–195. doi:10.1007/s10926-011-9338-9. ISSN 1053-0487. PMID 22038297. S2CID 25394336.

White, Marc; Wagner, Shannon; Schultz, Izabela Z.; Murray, Eleanor; Bradley, Susan M.; Hsu, Vernita; McGuire, Lisa; Schulz, Werner (2013). "Modifiable workplace risk factors contributing to workplace absence across health conditions: A stakeholder-centered best-evidence synthesis of systematic reviews". Work. 45 (4): 475–92. doi:10.3233/WOR-131628. PMID 23531590.

Murray, Eleanor J.; Robins, James M.; Seage, George R.; Freedberg, Kenneth A.; Hernán, Miguel A. (2017-06-30). "A Comparison of Agent-Based Models and the Parametric G-Formula for Causal Inference". American Journal of Epidemiology. 186 (2): 131–142. doi:10.1093/aje/kwx091. ISSN 0002-9262. PMC 5860229. PMID 28838064.

Cowger, Tori; Murray, Eleanor; Clarke, Jaylen; Bassett, Mary; Ojikutu, Bisola; Sánchez, Sarimer; Linos, Natalia; Hall, Kathryn (November 2022). "Lifting Universal Masking in Schools — Covid-19 Incidence among Students and Staff". The New England Journal of Medicine. 22 (2): 182–195. doi:10.1056/NEJMoa2211029. ISSN 1533-4406. PMC 9743802. PMID 36351262.
