= Truog =

Truog is a surname. Notable people with this surname include:

- Chas Truog, a penciller who worked on the comic book Animal Man
- Emil Truog, American soil scientist
- Robert Truog, American bioethicist

== See also ==
- George Truog House, a historic house in Allegheny County, Maryland
