= Franklin G. Miller =

American bioethicist

Franklin G. Miller (born 1948) is an American bioethicist and senior faculty member at the National Institutes of Health (NIH).

== Education ==
Miller received his B.A. in philosophy in 1971 from Columbia College, Columbia University, and his PhD from Columbia University in 1977, also in philosophy.

== Career ==
From 1990 until 1998, Miller was a faculty member at the University of Virginia. Since 1999, he has been a senior faculty member at the National Institutes of Health's department of bioethics, as well as a special expert at the NIH's Intramural Research Program. Since 2014, he has also been a professor of medical ethics by courtesy at Weill Cornell Medical College.

== Work ==
In 2008, Miller and Robert Truog co-authored a paper in the New England Journal of Medicine in which they questioned the dead donor rule, and proposed instead that living people should be able to donate vital organs so long as their brain was devastatingly damaged. In 2012, Miller co-authored a paper with Walter Sinnott-Armstrong in the Journal of Medical Ethics on whether killing was fundamentally wrong. In the paper, Miller and Sinnott-Armstrong claimed that there was nothing fundamentally wrong with killing another person, and that it was only incidentally bad because it led to total disability. In 2015, Miller and Ted Kaptchuk co-authored a perspective paper on placebo effects, again in the New England Journal of Medicine.
