= Athina Linou =

Greek doctor and epidemiologist

Athena Linou

Personal details
- Born: 1951 (age 74–75)
- Party: Syriza
- Spouse: Dimitrios Linos (m. 1975)
- Children: At least 5, including Natalia Linos
- Occupation: Politician

Athina Linou ( 1951) is a Greek doctor and professor of epidemiology and doctor at the University of Athens. She was elected to the Hellenic parliament in June 2023 as a member of the Syriza party.
