= 2020 United States House of Representatives elections in Massachusetts =

- November 3, 2020

All 9 Massachusetts seats to the United States House of Representatives
	Majority party	Minority party
Party	Democratic	Republican
Last election	9	0
Seats won	9	0
Seat change	Steady	Steady
Popular vote	2,482,596	699,001
Percentage	74.63%	21.01%
Swing	▼3.58%	▲0.98%

Democratic
40–50%
50–60%
60–70%
70–80%
80–90%
90–100%
Republican
50–60%

The 2020 United States House of Representatives elections in Massachusetts were held on November 3, 2020, to elect the nine U.S. representatives from the state of Massachusetts, one from each of the state's nine congressional districts. The elections coincided with the 2020 U.S. presidential election, as well as other elections to the House of Representatives, elections to the United States Senate and various state and local elections. Primary elections were held on September 1.

== Overview ==
District	Democratic		Republican		Others		Total		Result
District	Votes	%	Votes	%	Votes	%	Votes	%	Result
District 1	275,376	96.51%	0	0.00%	9,956	3.49%	285,332	100.0%	Democratic hold
District 2	249,854	65.33%	132,220	34.57%	378	0.10%	382,452	100.0%	Democratic hold
District 3	286,896	97.74%	0	0.00%	6,643	2.26%	293,539	100.0%	Democratic hold
District 4	251,102	60.83%	160,474	38.87%	1,247	0.30%	412,823	100.0%	Democratic hold
District 5	294,427	74.32%	101,351	25.58%	405	0.10%	396,183	100.0%	Democratic hold
District 6	286,377	65.43%	150,695	34.43%	605	0.14%	437,677	100.0%	Democratic hold
District 7	267,362	86.62%	0	0.00%	41,288	13.38%	308,650	100.0%	Democratic hold
District 8	310,940	80.68%	0	0.00%	74,461	19.32%	385,401	100.0%	Democratic hold
District 9	260,262	61.30%	154,261	36.33%	10,078	2.37%	424,601	100.0%	Democratic hold
Total	2,482,596	74.63%	699,001	21.01%	145,061	4.36%	3,326,658	100.0%	

Popular vote
Democratic	74.63%
Republican	21.01%
Others	4.36%

House seats
Democratic	100.00%

== District 1 ==
2020 Massachusetts's 1st congressional district election
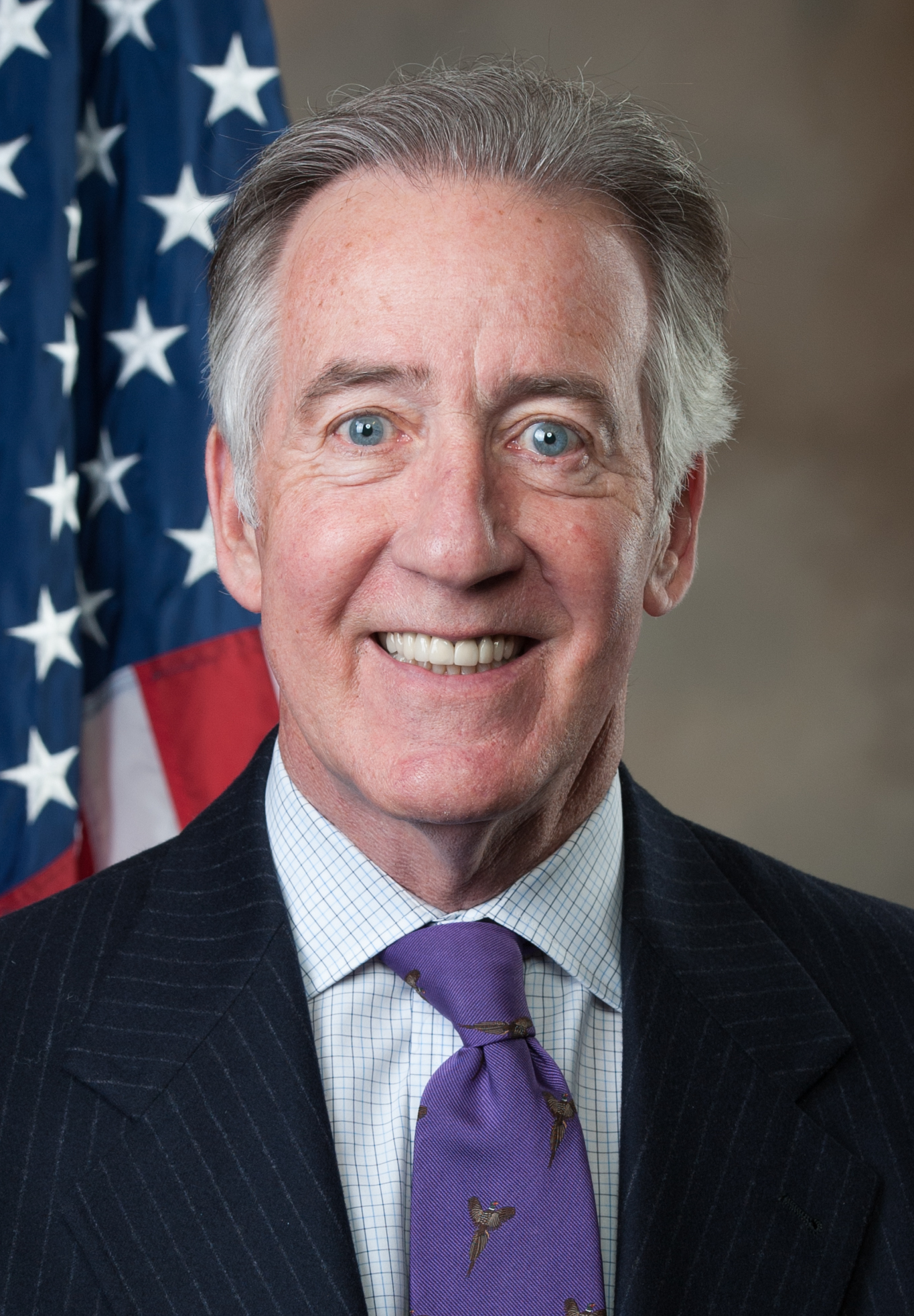
Nominee	Richard Neal
Party	Democratic
Popular vote	275,376
Percentage	96.5%
- County results Neal: 90–100%
U.S. Representative before election
Richard Neal
Democratic
Elected U.S. Representative
Richard Neal
Democratic

The 1st district is based in the western and central parts of the state, and includes the city of Springfield. The incumbent was Democrat Richard Neal, who was reelected with 97.6% of the vote in 2018 without major-party opposition.

=== Democratic primary ===
==== Candidates ====
===== Nominee =====
- Richard Neal, incumbent U.S. representative

===== Eliminated in primary =====
- Alex Morse, mayor of Holyoke

===== Declined =====
- Tahirah Amatul-Wadud, attorney and candidate for Massachusetts's 1st congressional district in 2018
- David Daley, author and former editor-in-chief of Salon

===== Endorsements =====
Alex Morse

U.S. representatives

- Alexandria Ocasio-Cortez, U.S. representative from NY-14 (2019–present)

State legislators

- Charles Booker, former Democratic candidate for United States Senate in Kentucky, and member of the Kentucky House of Representatives

Municipal officials

- Carmen Yulín Cruz, Mayor of San Juan, Puerto Rico

Individuals

- Jamaal Bowman, educator and 2020 Democratic nominee in NY-16
- Shannon Liss-Riordan, labor attorney and former candidate for U.S. Senate in 2020
- Andrew Yang, entrepreneur and 2020 Democratic presidential candidate

Labor unions

- Massachusetts Nurses Association

Organizations

- Brand New Congress
- Democratic Socialists of America – Berkshire County chapter
- Humanity Forward
- Justice Democrats
- LGBTQ Victory Fund
- Make Room
- Massachusetts Peace Action
- Our Revolution Massachusetts
- Progressive Democrats of America
- Sunrise Movement
- Working Families Party
Richard Neal

Governors

- Charlie Baker, governor of Massachusetts (2015–present) (Republican)

U.S. representatives

- Barney Frank, former U.S. representative (MA-4) (1984–2013)
- John Lewis, former U.S. representative (GA-5) (1987–2020) (deceased)
- John Olver, former U.S. representative (1991–2013)
- Nancy Pelosi, speaker of the House (CA-12) (1987–present)

State legislators

- William "Smitty" Pignatelli, member of the Massachusetts House of Representatives from the 4th Berkshire District

Labor unions

- AFL–CIO Massachusetts
- American Federation of State, County and Municipal Employees – Council 93
- American Federation of Teachers
- Carpenters Local 336
- National Education Association
- Service Employees International Union – Massachusetts State Council

Organizations

- BOLD PAC
- Brady Campaign
- Democratic Majority for Israel (DMFI) PAC
- Equality PAC
- Human Rights Campaign
- J Street PAC
- NARAL Pro-Choice America
- Planned Parenthood

Newspapers and other media

- The Berkshire Eagle

==== Polling ====
Poll source	Date(s) administered	Sample size (Note: Key: A – all adults RV – registered voters LV – likely voters V – unclear)	Margin of error	Alex Morse	Richard Neal	Undecided
RABA Research/Jewish Insider	August 23–24, 2020	518 (LV)	± 4.3%	40%	49%	12%
Beacon Research (Note: This poll was sponsored by Morse's campaign.)	August 15–16, 2020	391 (LV)	± 4.9%	41%	46%	13%
Beacon Research	August 7–8, 2020	853 (LV)	± 3.4%	35%	45%	20%
Victoria Research (Note: This poll was sponsored by Indivisible Action, which supports Morse.)	June 16–18, 2020	492 (LV)	± 4.4%	25%	55%	20%

==== Debate ====
2020 Massachusetts's 1st congressional district democratic primary debate
No.	Date	Host	Moderator	Link	Democratic	Democratic
Key: P Participant A Absent N Not invited I Invited W Withdrawn						
Key: P Participant A Absent N Not invited I Invited W Withdrawn					Richard Neal	Alex Morse
1	Aug. 17, 2020	New England Public Media; The Berkshire Eagle; The Republican	Ray Hershel		P	P

==== Primary results ====
Democratic primary results by municipality Neal: 50–60%; 60–70%; 70–80%; Morse: 50–60%; 60–70%

Democratic primary results
Party	Candidate	Votes	%
Democratic	Richard Neal (incumbent)	84,092	58.7
Democratic	Alex Morse	59,110	41.2
Democratic	Write-ins	191	0.1
Total votes		143,393	100.0

=== Republican primary ===
==== Candidates ====
===== Withdrawn =====
- John Cain, businessman and former Navy officer

=== General election ===
==== Predictions ====
Source	Ranking	As of
The Cook Political Report	Safe D	July 2, 2020
Inside Elections	Safe D	June 2, 2020
Sabato's Crystal Ball	Safe D	July 2, 2020
Politico	Safe D	April 19, 2020
Daily Kos	Safe D	June 3, 2020
RCP	Safe D	June 9, 2020
Niskanen	Safe D	June 7, 2020

==== Results ====
Massachusetts's 1st congressional district, 2020
Party	Candidate	Votes	%
Democratic	Richard Neal (incumbent)	275,376	96.5
Write-in		9,956	3.5
Total votes		285,332	100.0
Democratic hold			

== District 2 ==
2020 Massachusetts's 2nd congressional district election
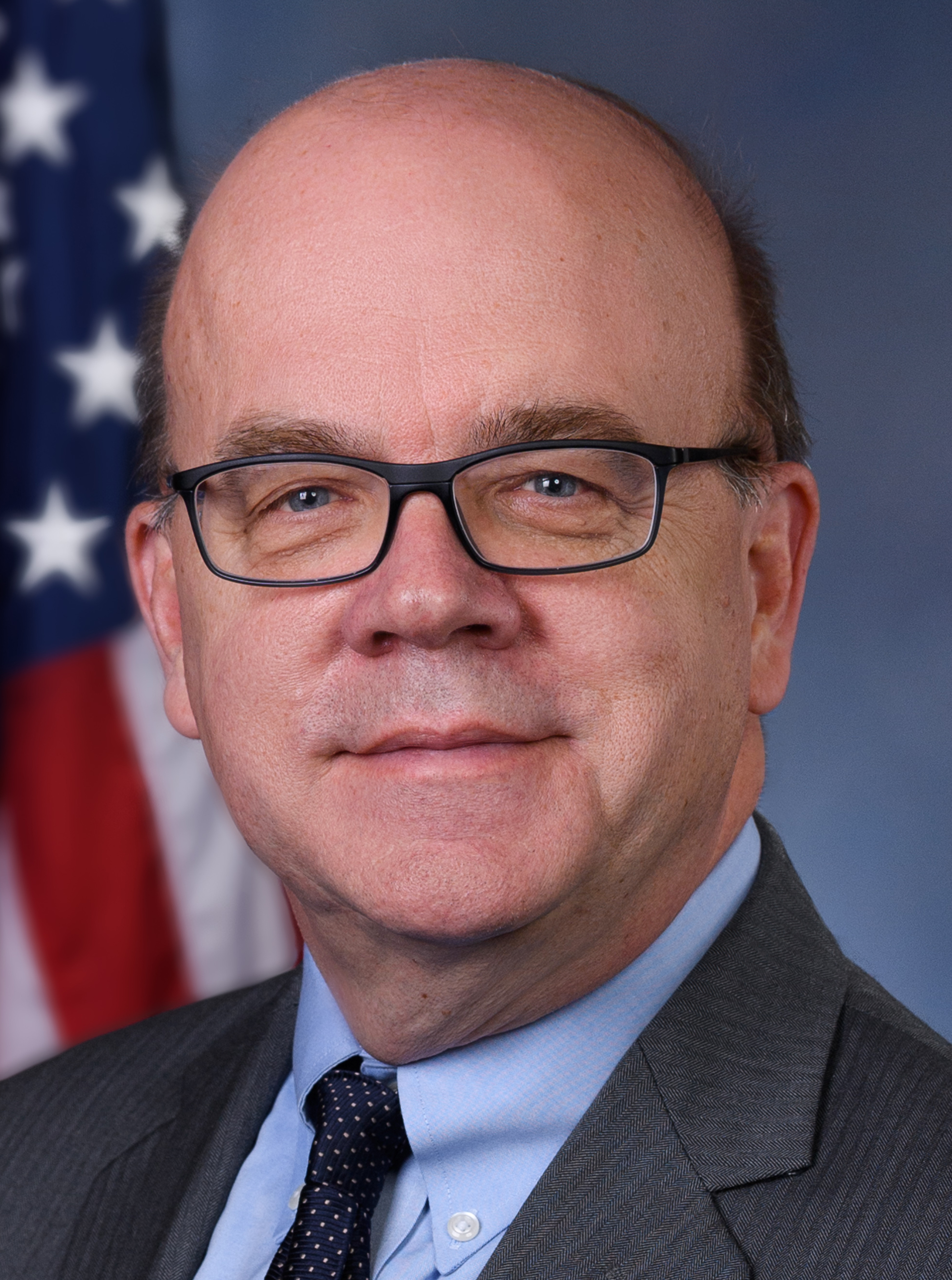

Nominee	Jim McGovern	Tracy Lovvorn
Party	Democratic	Republican
Popular vote	249,854	132,220
Percentage	65.3%	34.6%
- McGovern: 40–50% 50–60% 60–70% 70–80% 80–90% >90% Lovvorn: 50–60%
U.S. Representative before election
Jim McGovern
Democratic
Elected U.S. Representative
Jim McGovern
Democratic

The 2nd congressional district is in central Massachusetts and includes Worcester. The incumbent was Democrat Jim McGovern, who was reelected with 67.1% of the vote in 2018.

=== Democratic primary ===
==== Candidates ====
===== Nominee =====
- Jim McGovern, incumbent U.S. representative

==== Primary results ====
Democratic primary results
Party	Candidate	Votes	%
Democratic	Jim McGovern (incumbent)	121,645	99.4
Democratic	Write-ins	686	0.6
Total votes		122,331	100.0

=== Republican primary ===
==== Candidates ====
===== Nominee =====
- Tracy Lovvorn, healthcare operations manager and nominee for Massachusetts's 2nd congressional district in 2018

==== Primary results ====
Republican primary results
Party	Candidate	Votes	%
Republican	Tracy Lovvorn	26,456	99.1
Republican	Write-ins	241	0.9
Total votes		26,697	100.0

=== General election ===
==== Predictions ====
Source	Ranking	As of
The Cook Political Report	Safe D	July 2, 2020
Inside Elections	Safe D	June 2, 2020
Sabato's Crystal Ball	Safe D	July 2, 2020
Politico	Safe D	April 19, 2020
Daily Kos	Safe D	June 3, 2020
RCP	Safe D	June 9, 2020
Niskanen	Safe D	June 7, 2020

==== Results ====
Massachusetts's 2nd congressional district, 2020
Party	Candidate	Votes	%
Democratic	Jim McGovern (incumbent)	249,854	65.3
Republican	Tracy Lovvorn	132,220	34.6
Write-in		378	0.1
Total votes		382,452	100.0
Democratic hold			

== District 3 ==
2020 Massachusetts's 3rd congressional district election
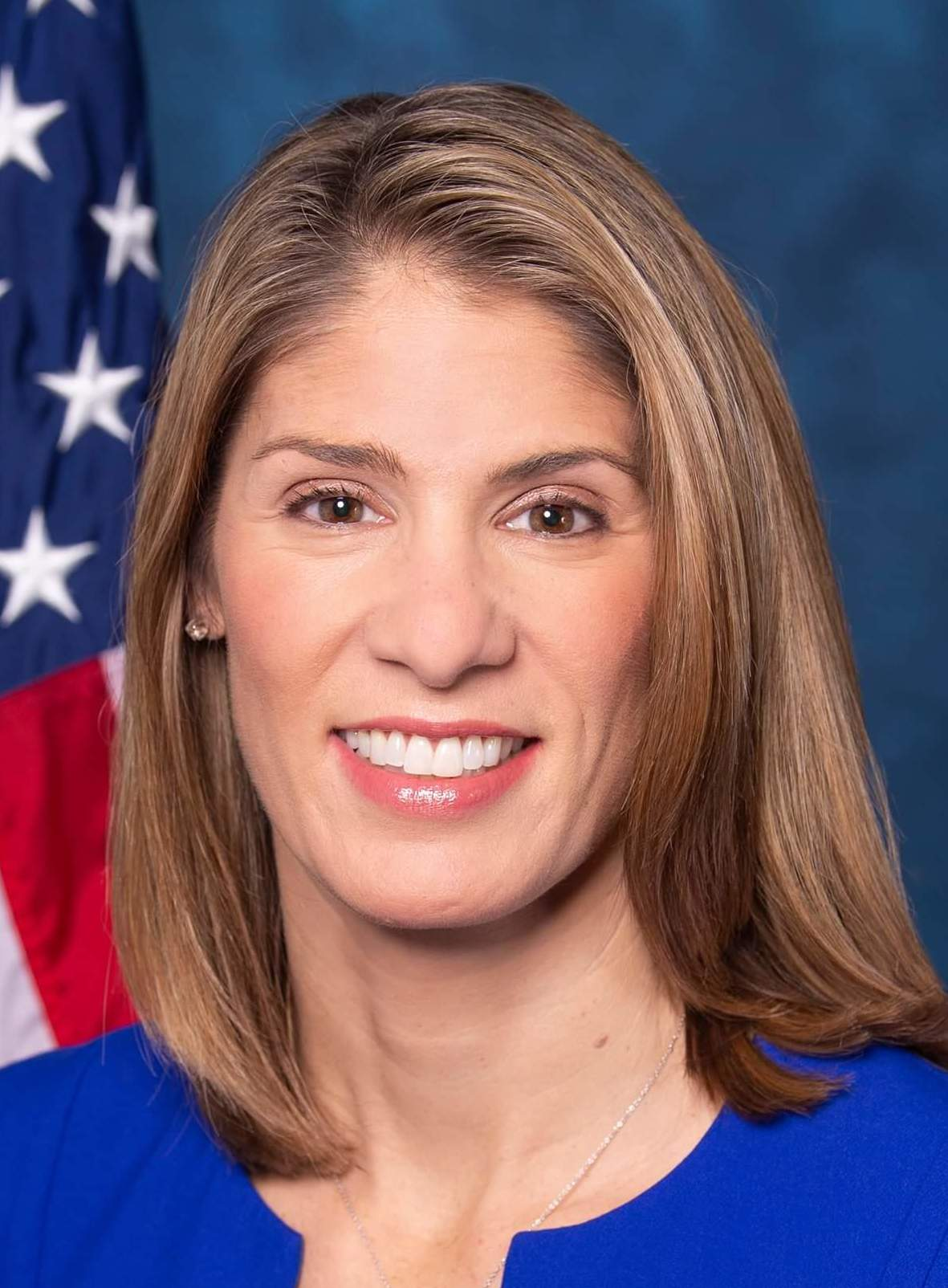
Nominee	Lori Trahan
Party	Democratic
Popular vote	286,896
Percentage	97.7%
- County results Trahan: 90–100%
U.S. Representative before election
Lori Trahan
Democratic
Elected U.S. Representative
Lori Trahan
Democratic

The 3rd district is based in northeastern and central Massachusetts, and includes the cities of Lowell, Lawrence, and Haverhill. The incumbent was Democrat Lori Trahan, who was elected with 62.0% of the vote in 2018.

=== Democratic primary ===
==== Candidates ====
===== Nominee =====
- Lori Trahan, incumbent U.S. representative

===== Declined =====
- Dan Koh, Andover selectman, former chief of staff to Boston mayor Marty Walsh, and candidate for Massachusetts's 3rd congressional district in 2018

==== Endorsements ====
Lori Trahan

Federal officials

- Ayanna Pressley, U.S. representative (MA-07)
- Elizabeth Warren, U.S. senator from Massachusetts

Organizations

- J Street PAC
- NARAL Pro-Choice America
- Planned Parenthood Action Fund

==== Primary results ====
Democratic primary results
Party	Candidate	Votes	%
Democratic	Lori Trahan (incumbent)	115,142	99.2
Democratic	Write-ins	880	0.8
Total votes		116,022	100.0

=== General election ===
==== Predictions ====
Source	Ranking	As of
The Cook Political Report	Safe D	July 2, 2020
Inside Elections	Safe D	June 2, 2020
Sabato's Crystal Ball	Safe D	July 2, 2020
Politico	Safe D	April 19, 2020
Daily Kos	Safe D	June 3, 2020
RCP	Safe D	June 9, 2020
Niskanen	Safe D	June 7, 2020

==== Results ====
Massachusetts's 3rd congressional district, 2020
Party	Candidate	Votes	%
Democratic	Lori Trahan (incumbent)	286,896	97.7
Write-in		6,643	2.3
Total votes		293,539	100.0
Democratic hold			

== District 4 ==
2020 Massachusetts's 4th congressional district election
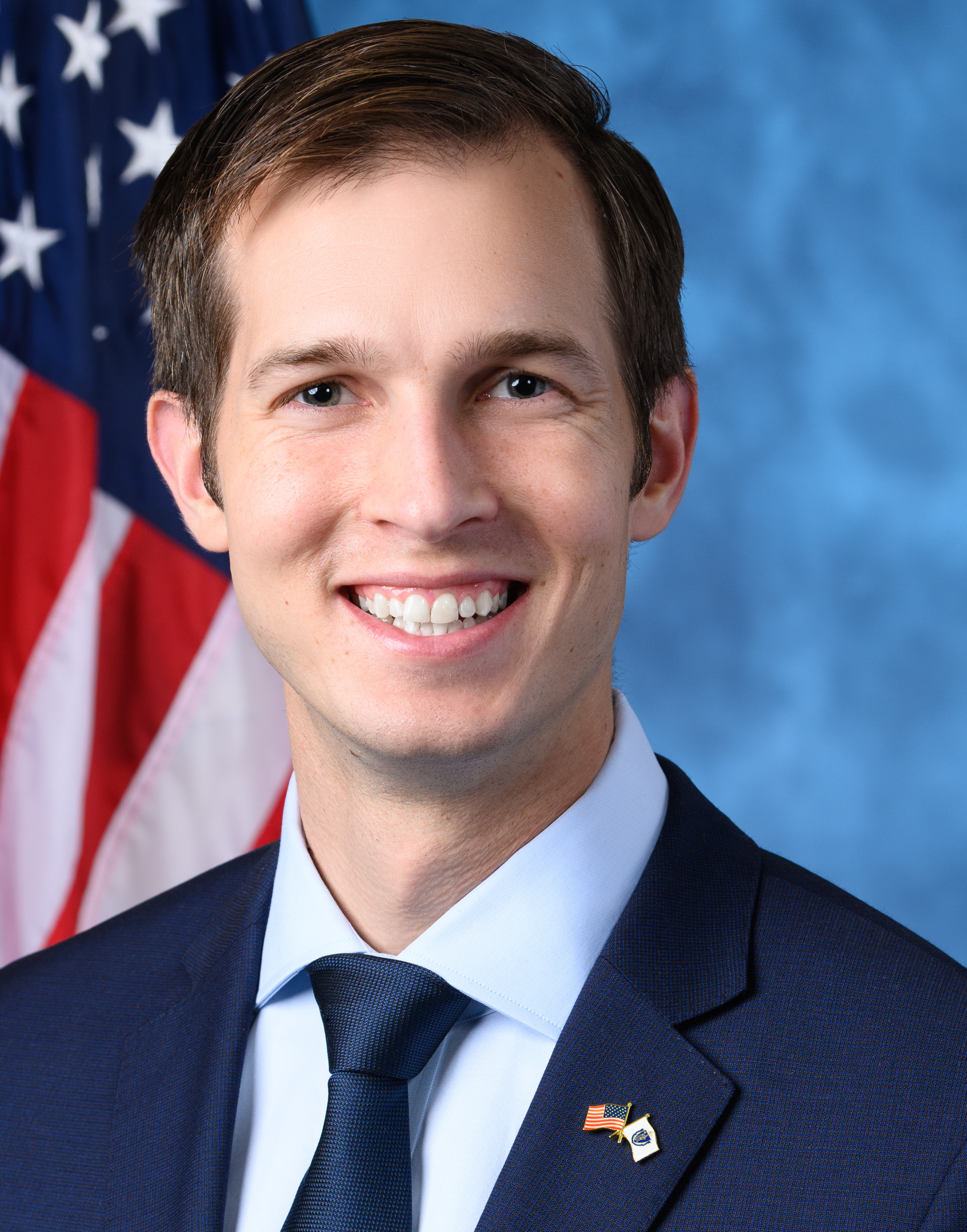

Nominee	Jake Auchincloss	Julie Hall
Party	Democratic	Republican
Popular vote	251,102	160,474
Percentage	60.8%	38.9%
- Auchincloss: 40–50% 50–60% 60–70% 70–80% 80–90% >90% Hall: 50–60%
U.S. Representative before election
Joe Kennedy III
Democratic
Elected U.S. Representative
Jake Auchincloss
Democratic

The 4th congressional district is mostly in southern Massachusetts and includes Brookline, the southwestern suburbs of Boston, and northern Bristol County. The incumbent was Democrat Joe Kennedy III, who was reelected with 97.7% of the vote in 2018 without major-party opposition. On September 21, 2019, Kennedy announced that he would not seek reelection, instead challenging incumbent U.S. Senator Ed Markey in the Democratic primary for the 2020 United States Senate election in Massachusetts.

The open seat attracted 12 candidates to file for the primary. On September 4, the Associated Press called the race for Jake Auchincloss, who won with 34,971 votes, a 1.4% margin over Jesse Mermell. Auchincloss went on to defeat Republican Julie Hall in the general election.

=== Democratic primary ===
==== Candidates ====
===== Nominee =====
- Jake Auchincloss, Newton city councilor, U.S. Marine veteran, and former Republican political organizer for Governor Charlie Baker's 2014 campaign

===== Eliminated in primary =====
- Becky Grossman, Newton city councilor
- Alan Khazei, co-founder and former CEO of City Year and candidate for the U.S. Senate in 2010
- Ihssane Leckey, former Wall Street regulator
- Natalia Linos, epidemiologist and executive director of the FXB Center for Health and Human Rights at Harvard University
- Jesse Mermell, former Brookline select boardmember and former aide to former governor Deval Patrick
- Ben Sigel, attorney and former president of the Hispanic National Bar Association

===== Withdrew =====
- David Cavell, Assistant Attorney General of Massachusetts and former aide to President Barack Obama (withdrew on August 13 and endorsed Mermell) (remained on ballot)
- Nick Matthew, former public school teacher and nonprofit activist (endorsed Leckey)
- Herb Robinson, engineer
- Thomas Shack, former Massachusetts State Comptroller (endorsed Cavell, then Khazei)
- Chris Zannetos, tech entrepreneur (withdrew on August 26 and endorsed Mermell) (remained on ballot)

===== Declined =====
- Chris Dempsey, former policy director for Joe Kennedy III's election campaign in 2012
- Paul Feeney, state senator
- Deb Goldberg, Massachusetts State Treasurer
- Jay Gonzalez, former state secretary of administration and finance and nominee for governor of Massachusetts in 2018
- Patricia Haddad, state representative
- Joe Kennedy III, incumbent U.S. representative (ran for U.S. Senate)
- Scott W. Lang, former mayor of New Bedford
- Marc Pacheco, state senator
- Becca Rausch, state senator
- Tommy Vitolo, state representative
- Setti Warren, former mayor of Newton
- Josh Zakim, former Boston city councilor

===== Endorsements =====
Jake Auchincloss

U.S. senators

- Ed Markey, U.S. senator from Massachusetts (2013–present)
- Elizabeth Warren, U.S. senator from Massachusetts (2013–present)

U.S. representatives

- Joe Kennedy III, member of the U.S. House of Representatives from Massachusetts's 4th congressional district

State executives

- James E. Timilty, treasurer of Norfolk County, Massachusetts, member of the Massachusetts Senate from the Bristol and Norfolk district

State legislators

- Carole Fiola, state representative
- Patricia Haddad, state representative and Speaker pro Tempore of the Massachusetts House of Representatives
- Paul Schmid, state representative

Organizations

- Serve America
- VoteVets

Labor unions

- Massachusetts AFL–CIO
- National Association of Government Employees (NAGE)
- Teamsters Local 25

Newspapers and other media

- The Boston Globe
- The Sun Chronicle
Becky Grossman

Members of U.S. cabinet

- Julian Castro, United States Secretary of Housing and Urban Development (2014–2017), mayor of San Antonio, Texas (2009–2014), member of the San Antonio City Council from the 7th district (2001–2005)

Members of U.S. Congress

- Ro Khanna, member of the U.S. House of Representatives from California's 17th congressional district

State executives

- Steve Grossman, Treasurer and Receiver-General of Massachusetts (2011–2015), national chair of the Democratic National Committee (1997–1999), chair of the Massachusetts Democratic Party (1991–1993)

State legislators

- Ruth Balser, member of the Massachusetts House of Representatives
- Bill Bowles, member of the Massachusetts House of Representatives from the 2nd Bristol District (2009–2011)
- Cynthia Stone Creem, majority leader of the Massachusetts Senate (2018–present), member of the Massachusetts Senate from the 1st Middlesex and Norfolk district (1999–present), member of the Massachusetts Governor's Council (1995–1999)
- Louis Kafka, member of the Massachusetts House of Representatives from the 8th Norfolk District (1991–present)
- Kay Khan, member of the Massachusetts House of Representatives (1995–present)
- David Linsky, member of the Massachusetts House of Representatives from the 5th Middlesex District
- Joan Menard, member of the Massachusetts Senate from the 1st Bristol and Plymouth District (2000–2011), chair of the Massachusetts Democratic Party (1993–2000), member of the Massachusetts House of Representatives from the 5th Bristol District (1979–2000)
- Michael Rodrigues, member of the Massachusetts Senate from the 1st Bristol and Plymouth district (2011–present) and member of the Massachusetts House of Representatives from the 8th Bristol district (1996–2011)
- Alan Silvia, member of the Massachusetts House of Representatives from the 7th Bristol District (2013–present)

Local officials

- Marian Ryan, district attorney of Middlesex County, Massachusetts (2013–present)

Organizations

- Moms Demand Action for Gun Sense in America
- Newton Firefighters Associations Local 863
- The Professional Fire Fighters of Massachusetts (PFFM)
Alan Khazei

Members of U.S. cabinet

- Arne Duncan, former U.S. secretary of education (2009–2015)
- Michèle Flournoy, former U.S. undersecretary of defense for policy (2009–2012)
- Leon Panetta, former secretary of defense
- Susan Rice, former U.S. national security advisor (2013–2017), U.S. ambassador to the United Nations (2009–2013), and U.S. assistant secretary of state for African affairs (1997–2001)

U.S. senators

- Michael Bennet, U.S. senator from Colorado
- Gary Hart, former U.S. special envoy for Northern Ireland (2014–2017) and U.S. senator (D-CO) (1975–1987) and 1984 and 1988 Democratic presidential candidate

Members of U.S. Congress

- Jamie Raskin, U.S. representative (MD-08) and Congressional Progressive Caucus vice chair

State legislators

- Marc Pacheco, state senator, former state Senate president pro tempore (2015–2019), Democratic candidate in 2001 MA-09 special election, and former state representative (1989–1993)
- William "Smitty" Pignatelli, state representative
- Jeffrey Roy, state representative

Local officials

- Mitch Landrieu, Mayor of New Orleans (2010–2018) and Lieutenant Governor of Louisiana (2004–2010)

Organizations

- Iranian American Political Action Committee (IAPAC)
- National Iranian American Council (NIAC) Action

Individuals

- Cornell William Brooks, former NAACP president
- Rosabeth Moss Kanter, Harvard business professor
- Gen. (Ret.) Stanley A. McChrystal, former ISAF and USFOR-A commander (2009–2010)
Ihssane Leckey

Members of U.S. Congress

- Ilhan Omar, U.S. representative for Minnesota's 5th congressional district

State legislators

- Nika Elugardo, state representative

Organizations

- Brand New Congress
- Jewish Voice for Peace Action
- Massachusetts Peace Action
- People's Policy Project
- United Food and Commercial Workers Local 1445

Individuals

- Cori Bush, politician, registered nurse, pastor, activist from Saint Louis, Missouri, and Democratic nominee for Missouri's 1st congressional district
- Brianna Westbrook, Arizona Democratic Party vice chair and executive committee member
Natalia Linos

Individuals

- Mary T. Bassett, former Commissioner of Health of the City of New York
- R. Nicholas Burns, former undersecretary of state for political affairs
- Sheldon Glashow, Nobel Prize-winning physicist
- Frank Hu, professor, Harvard School of Public Health
Jesse Mermell

Members of U.S. Congress

- Ayanna Pressley, U.S. representative (MA-07)

State executives

- Suzanne Bump, state auditor
- Maura Healey, attorney general

State legislators

- Julian Cyr, state senator
- Carol Doherty, state representative
- Carolyn Dykema, state representative
- Paul Feeney, state senator
- Denise Garlick, state representative
- Jim Hawkins, state representative
- Becca Rausch, state senator
- Frank Smizik, former state representative

Local legislators

- Ritchie Torres, New York City Councilor and 2020 Democratic nominee for New York's 15th congressional district

Individuals

- Joshua Boger, founder of Vertex Pharmaceuticals
- Jeff Bussgang, venture capitalist
- Ben Cohen and Jerry Greenfield, founders of Ben & Jerry's ice cream
- Stephen Kaufer, founder and CEO of Tripadvisor
- Barbara F. Lee, philanthropist
- Shannon Liss-Riordan, labor attorney and former candidate for US Senate
- Quentin Palfrey, 2018 Democratic nominee for lieutenant governor
- Diane Patrick, former first lady of Massachusetts
- Dan Rivera, Mayor of Lawrence

Organizations

- Coalition for Social Justice
- Make Room
- NARAL Pro-Choice America
- National Women's Political Caucus
- Planned Parenthood Action Fund

Labor unions

- Carmen's Union Local 589
- International Union of Painters and Allied Trades District Councils 35 and 12
- Massachusetts Nurses Association
- Massachusetts State Council of Machinists
- Massachusetts Teachers Association
- SEIU Massachusetts State Council
- United Auto Workers Region 9A
Ben Sigel

Members of U.S. Congress

- Tony Cárdenas, member of the U.S. House of Representatives from California's 29th district (2013–present), member of the Los Angeles City Council from the 6th district (2003–2013), member of the California State Assembly from the 39th district (1996–2002)

State executives

- Nellie Gorbea, Secretary of State of Rhode Island (2015–present)

Organizations

- CHC Bold PAC

==== Polling ====
Poll source	Date(s) administered	Sample size	Margin of error	Jake Auchincloss	Dave Cavell	Becky Grossman	Alan Khazei	Ihssane Leckey	Natalia Linos	Jesse Mermell	Ben Sigel	Chris Zannetos	Other	Undecided
RABA Research/Jewish Insider	August 27–28, 2020	497 (LV)	± 4.39%	23%	–	15%	8%	11%	7%	22%	1%	–	3% (Note: "Someone else" with 3%)	10%
	August 26, 2020	Zannetos withdraws from the race and endorses Mermell												
Data for Progress	August 10–14, 2020	515 (LV)	± 4.9%	14% (Note: With voters who lean towards a given candidate)	1%	13%	7%	9%	9%	13%	3%	1%	–	29%
	August 13, 2020	Cavell withdraws from the race and endorses Mermell												
Frederick Polls (Note: This poll was sponsored by Leckey's campaign.)	August 1–4, 2020	400 (LV)	± 4.9%	16%	7%	19%	6%	11%	4%	10%	2%	1%	–	25%
Frederick Polls	June, 2020	400 (LV)	± 4.9%	7%	–	17%	–	3%	–	9%	–	–	–	46%
Beacon Research (Note: Poll sponsored by Grossman's campaign)	May 26–30, 2020	501 (LV)	± 4.0%	7%	2%	13%	4%	–	–	7%	4%	1%	1% (Note: "Other" with 1%)	60%

==== Primary results ====
Democratic primary results by municipality Auchincloss: 10–20%; 20–30%; Mermell: 20–30%; 30–40%; 40–50%; Grossman: 20–30%

Democratic primary results
Party	Candidate	Votes	%
Democratic	Jake Auchincloss	35,361	22.4
Democratic	Jesse Mermell	33,216	21.0
Democratic	Becky Grossman	28,578	18.1
Democratic	Natalia Linos	18,364	11.6
Democratic	Ihssane Leckey	17,539	11.1
Democratic	Alan Khazei	14,440	9.1
Democratic	Chris Zannetos (withdrawn)	5,135	3.3
Democratic	David Cavell (withdrawn)	2,498	1.6
Democratic	Ben Sigel	2,465	1.6
Democratic	Write-ins	242	0.2
Total votes		157,838	100.0

=== Republican primary ===
==== Candidates ====
===== Nominee =====
- Julie Hall, former Attleboro city councilor

===== Eliminated in primary =====
- David Rosa, U.S. Army veteran

===== Declined =====
- Shawn Dooley, state representative
- Shaunna O'Connell, mayor of Taunton and former state representative
- Keiko Orrall, former state representative

==== Endorsements ====
Julie Hall

Labor unions

- Massachusetts Fraternal Order of Police

Organizations

- Massachusetts Republican Party
Declined to endorse

State executives

- Charlie Baker, governor of Massachusetts (2015–present)

==== Primary results ====
Republican primary results
Party	Candidate	Votes	%
Republican	Julie Hall	19,394	62.8
Republican	David Rosa	11,296	36.6
Republican	Write-ins	182	0.6
Total votes		30,872	100.0

=== General election ===
==== Predictions ====
Source	Ranking	As of
The Cook Political Report	Safe D	July 2, 2020
Inside Elections	Safe D	June 2, 2020
Sabato's Crystal Ball	Safe D	July 2, 2020
Politico	Safe D	April 19, 2020
Daily Kos	Safe D	June 3, 2020
RCP	Safe D	June 9, 2020
Niskanen	Safe D	June 7, 2020

==== Results ====
Massachusetts's 4th congressional district, 2020
Party	Candidate	Votes	%
Democratic	Jake Auchincloss	251,102	60.8
Republican	Julie Hall	160,474	38.9
Write-in		1,247	0.3
Total votes		412,823	100.0
Democratic hold			

== District 5 ==
2020 Massachusetts's 5th congressional district election
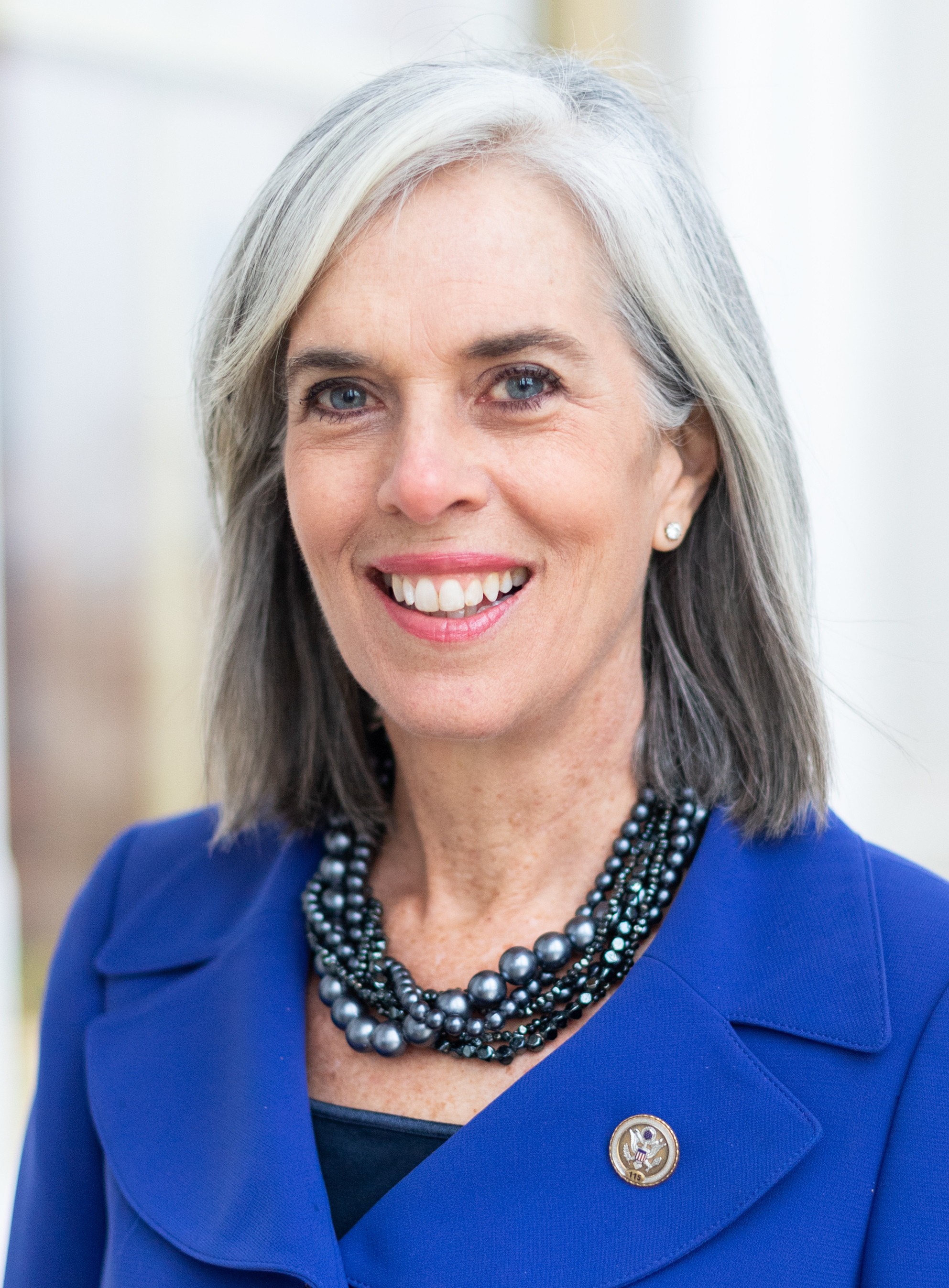

Nominee	Katherine Clark	Caroline Colarusso
Party	Democratic	Republican
Popular vote	294,427	101,351
Percentage	74.3%	25.6%
- Clark: 50–60% 60–70% 70–80% 80–90% >90%
U.S. Representative before election
Katherine Clark
Democratic
Elected U.S. Representative
Katherine Clark
Democratic

The 5th congressional district contains Boston's northern and western suburbs, including Malden and Framingham. The incumbent was Democrat Katherine Clark, who was reelected with 75.9% of the vote in 2018.

=== Democratic primary ===
==== Candidates ====
===== Nominee =====
- Katherine Clark, incumbent U.S. representative

===== Withdrawn =====
- Raffaele DePalma, demographic analyst

==== Primary results ====
Democratic primary results
Party	Candidate	Votes	%
Democratic	Katherine Clark (incumbent)	162,768	99.4
Democratic	Write-ins	938	0.6
Total votes		163,706	100.0

=== Republican primary ===
==== Candidates ====
===== Nominee =====
- Caroline Colarusso, Stoneham selectwoman
Caroline Colarusso

Notable Individuals

- Mike Eruzione, American former ice hockey player

Labor Unions

- New England Police Benevolent Association

==== Primary results ====
Republican primary results
Party	Candidate	Votes	%
Republican	Caroline Colarusso	18,818	98.2
Republican	Write-ins	336	1.8
Total votes		19,154	100.0

=== General election ===
==== Predictions ====
Source	Ranking	As of
The Cook Political Report	Safe D	July 2, 2020
Inside Elections	Safe D	June 2, 2020
Sabato's Crystal Ball	Safe D	July 2, 2020
Politico	Safe D	April 19, 2020
Daily Kos	Safe D	June 3, 2020
RCP	Safe D	June 9, 2020
Niskanen	Safe D	June 7, 2020

==== Results ====
Massachusetts's 5th congressional district, 2020
Party	Candidate	Votes	%
Democratic	Katherine Clark (incumbent)	294,427	74.3
Republican	Caroline Colarusso	101,351	25.6
Write-in		405	0.1
Total votes		396,183	100.0
Democratic hold			

== District 6 ==
2020 Massachusetts's 6th congressional district election
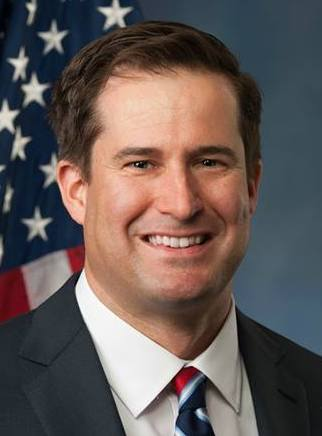

Nominee	Seth Moulton	John Paul Moran
Party	Democratic	Republican
Popular vote	286,377	150,695
Percentage	65.4%	34.4%
- Moulton: 50–60% 60–70% 70–80% 80–90% Moran: 50–60%
U.S. Representative before election
Seth Moulton
Democratic
Elected U.S. Representative
Seth Moulton
Democratic

The 6th district is based in northeastern Massachusetts, and contains most of Essex County, including the North Shore and Cape Ann. The incumbent was Democrat Seth Moulton, who was reelected with 65.2% of the vote in 2018. Moulton was a candidate for the Democratic presidential primary in 2020, and said that he had "no intention of giving up his seat in the House." He won his district's primary with the most votes ever recorded in a House primary election in Massachusetts history.

=== Democratic primary ===
==== Candidates ====
===== Nominee =====
- Seth Moulton, incumbent U.S. representative

===== Eliminated in primary =====
- Jamie Zahlaway Belsito, Massachusetts PPD commissioner and Salem State University trustee
- Angus McQuilken, gun control advocate

===== Withdrawn =====
- Nathaniel Mulcahy, scientist

===== Declined =====
- Kim Driscoll, mayor of Salem
- Lori Ehrlich, state representative
- Terrence Kennedy, member of the 6th district of the Massachusetts Governor's Council
- Barbara L'Italien, former state senator and candidate for Massachusetts's 3rd congressional district in 2018
- John F. Tierney, former U.S. representative
- Paul Tucker, state representative

==== Endorsements ====
Seth Moulton

Organizations

- Alliance for Retired Americans
- Animal Wellness Action
- Bay State Stonewall Democrats
- Brady Campaign Against Gun Violence
- Coalition to Stop Gun Violence
- Democratic Majority for Israel PAC
- Giffords
- Human Rights Campaign
- J Street PAC
- NARAL Pro-Choice America
- National Iranian American Council
- New Politics
- Newton Action Alliance
- Planned Parenthood Action Fund
- Veterans for Responsible Leadership
- Voter Protection Project
- VoteVets

Unions

- International Union of Electrical Workers–Communications Workers of America Local 201
- Massachusetts AFL–CIO
- Massachusetts & Northern New England Laborers' District Council
- Massachusetts Building Trades Council
- Teamsters Local 25

Newspapers

- The Daily Item (Lynn)
- The Lowell Sun (Lowell)

Individuals

- Donna D. Holaday, mayor of Newburyport
- Nathaniel Mulcahy, withdrawn 6th district candidate
Jamie Belsito

Organizations

- Massachusetts Peace Action
Angus McQuilken

Newspapers and other media

- North of Boston Media Group
- Wicked Local

==== Primary results ====
Democratic primary results
Party	Candidate	Votes	%
Democratic	Seth Moulton (incumbent)	124,928	78.0
Democratic	Jamie Zahlaway Belsito	19,492	12.2
Democratic	Angus McQuilken	15,478	9.6
Democratic	Write-ins	268	0.2
Total votes		160,166	100.0

=== Republican primary ===
==== Nominee ====
- John Paul Moran, businessman

==== Primary results ====
Republican primary results
Party	Candidate	Votes	%
Republican	John Paul Moran	32,564	98.9
Republican	Write-ins	375	1.1
Total votes		32,939	100.0

=== Independents ===
==== Candidates ====
===== Declared =====
- Christopher Fisher, carpenter

=== General election ===
==== Predictions ====
Source	Ranking	As of
The Cook Political Report	Safe D	July 2, 2020
Inside Elections	Safe D	June 2, 2020
Sabato's Crystal Ball	Safe D	July 2, 2020
Politico	Safe D	April 19, 2020
Daily Kos	Safe D	June 3, 2020
RCP	Safe D	June 9, 2020
Niskanen	Safe D	June 7, 2020

==== Results ====
Massachusetts's 6th congressional district, 2020
Party	Candidate	Votes	%
Democratic	Seth Moulton (incumbent)	286,377	65.4
Republican	John Paul Moran	150,695	34.4
Write-in		605	0.2
Total votes		437,677	100.0
Democratic hold			

== District 7 ==
2020 Massachusetts's 7th congressional district election
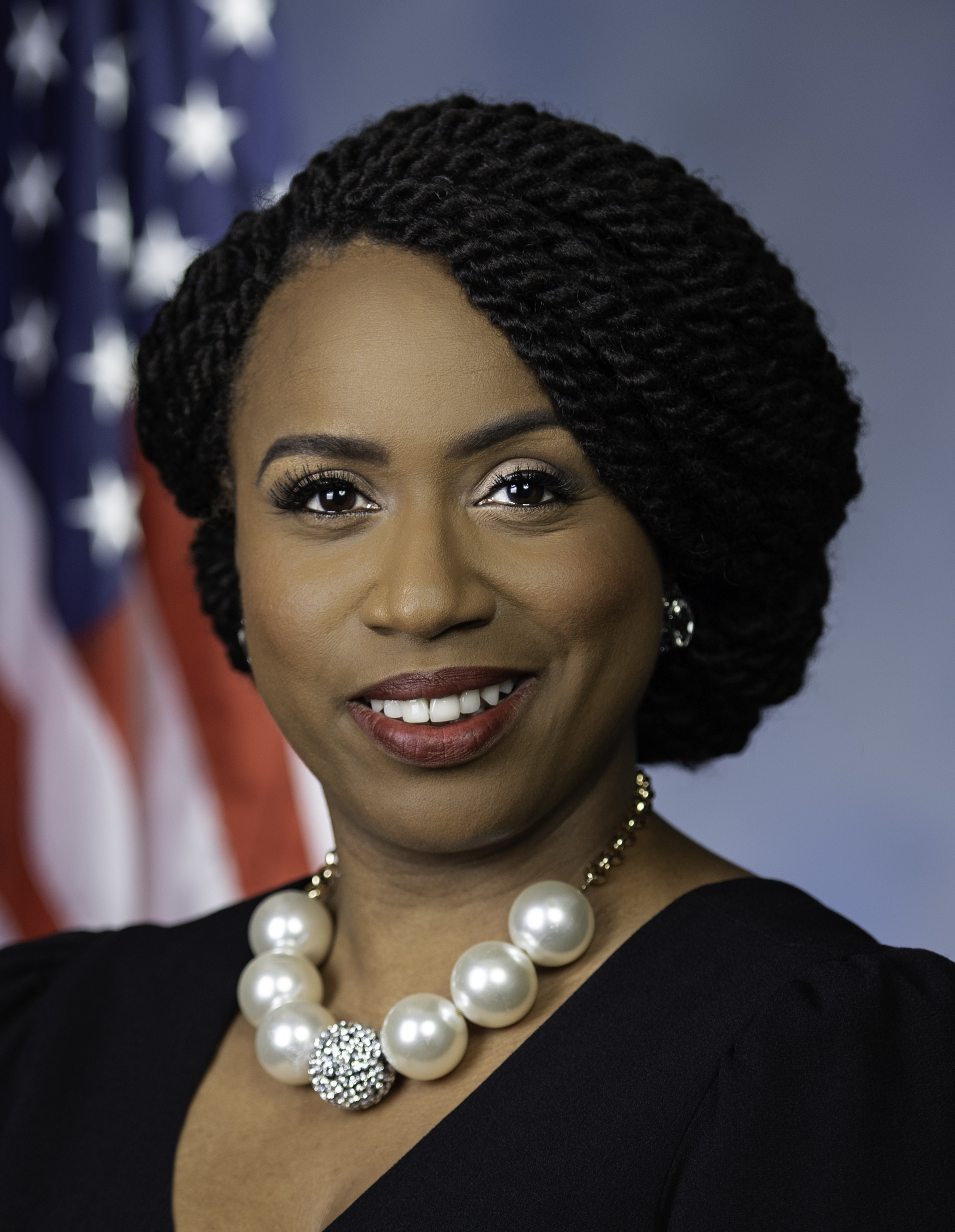

Nominee	Ayanna Pressley	Roy Owens
Party	Democratic	Independent
Popular vote	267,362	38,675
Percentage	86.6%	12.5%
- Pressley: 60–70% 70–80% 80–90% >90%
U.S. Representative before election
Ayanna Pressley
Democratic
Elected U.S. Representative
Ayanna Pressley
Democratic

The 7th district is in eastern Massachusetts, including roughly three-fourths of Boston and a few of its northern and southern suburbs. The incumbent was Democrat Ayanna Pressley, who defeated ten-term incumbent Mike Capuano in the 2018 primary election and ran against write-in votes only in the general election.

=== Democratic primary ===
==== Candidates ====
===== Nominee =====
- Ayanna Pressley, incumbent U.S. Representative

===== Endorsements =====
Ayanna Pressley

U.S. senators

- Bernie Sanders, U.S. senator from Vermont (Independent)

Organizations

- Democracy for America
- Justice Democrats
- League of Conservation Voters Action Fund
- MoveOn
- NARAL Pro-Choice America
- Planned Parenthood Action Fund
- Sierra Club

==== Primary results ====
Democratic primary results
Party	Candidate	Votes	%
Democratic	Ayanna Pressley (incumbent)	142,108	98.6
Democratic	Write-ins	1,979	1.4
Total votes		144,087	100.0

=== Republican primary ===
In order to qualify for the general election ballot, a write-in candidate must receive at least 2,000 votes.

==== Candidates ====
===== Eliminated in Primary =====
- Rayla Campbell (write-in), occupational zoning activist
- Rachel Miselman (write-in)

===== Primary results =====
Republican primary results
Party	Candidate	Votes	%
Republican	Other Write-ins	1,779	58.6
Republican	Rayla Campbell (write-in)	1,202	39.6
Republican	Rachel Miselman (write-in)	55	1.8
Total votes		3,036	100.0

=== Independent challenger ===
Pressley faced an independent challenge from Roy Owens, a perennial candidate. (Note: Roy Owens is considered a perennial candidate by Boston media. As of 2025, he has run for office at least 37 times, including: 20 campaigns for Boston City Council's 7th district seat: 1983, 1985, 1987, 1989, 1991, 1993, 1995, 1997, 1999, 2001, 2009 (special election), 2009 (regular election), 2011, 2013, 2015, 2017, 2019, 2021, 2023, 2025; 3 campaigns for an at-large seat on the Boston City Council: 2003, 2005, 2021; 1 campaign as the Republican nominee for Massachusetts House of Representatives' 9th Suffolk district in 2024; 1 campaign as an independent candidate for Massachusetts House of Representatives' 5th Suffolk district in 2022; 7 campaigns in Democratic primaries for Massachusetts House 5th Suffolk district: 1988, 2004, 2006, 2008, 2010, 2014, 2018; 3 campaigns in Democratic primaries for Massachusetts Senate's 2nd Suffolk district: 2012, 2014, 2016; 1campaign in a Republican primary for Massachusetts Senate's 1st Suffolk district in 1990) His professional resume included work as a pastor educator, (Note: Roy Owens Owens previously worked as a teacher in Boston Public Schools and Cathedral High School) Department of Public Welfare social worker, and Massachusetts Department of Corrections employee. Owens has held a reputation for being right-wing and anti-LGBTQ.

=== General election ===
==== Predictions ====
Source	Ranking	As of
The Cook Political Report	Safe D	July 2, 2020
Inside Elections	Safe D	June 2, 2020
Sabato's Crystal Ball	Safe D	July 2, 2020
Politico	Safe D	April 19, 2020
Daily Kos	Safe D	June 3, 2020
RCP	Safe D	June 9, 2020
Niskanen	Safe D	June 7, 2020

==== Results ====
Massachusetts's 7th congressional district, 2020
Party	Candidate	Votes	%
Democratic	Ayanna Pressley (incumbent)	267,362	86.6
Independent	Roy A. Owens Sr.	38,675	12.5
Write-in		2,613	0.9
Total votes		308,650	100.0
Democratic hold			

== District 8 ==
2020 Massachusetts's 8th congressional district election
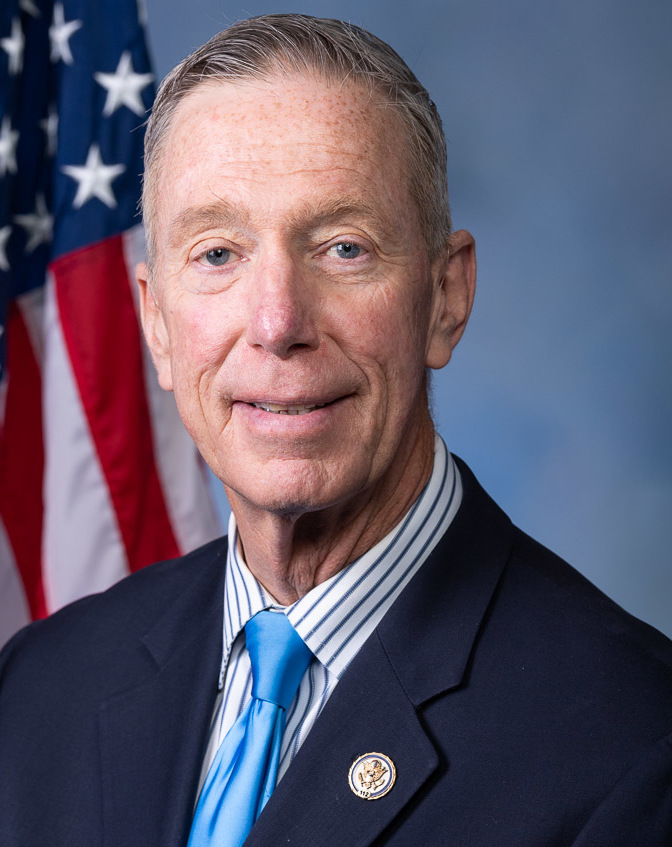

Nominee	Stephen F. Lynch	Jonathan D. Lott
Party	Democratic	Independent
Popular vote	310,940	72,060
Percentage	80.7%	18.7%
- Lynch: 60–70% 70–80% 80–90% >90%
U.S. Representative before election
Stephen F. Lynch
Democratic
Elected U.S. Representative
Stephen F. Lynch
Democratic

The 8th district includes South Boston and the southern Boston metro area. The incumbent was Democrat Stephen F. Lynch, who was reelected with 98.4% of the vote in 2018 without major-party opposition.

=== Democratic primary ===
In the Democratic primary, lawyer and ten-term incumbent Lynch defeated progressive challenger Robbie Goldstein, a medical doctor with expertise in infectious diseases and transgender healthcare. Several weeks before the primary, the Boston Globe noted the "stark contrast" between the candidates on several key issues, particularly healthcare and police reform. A proponent of Medicare for All, Goldstein ran on a platform of expanding healthcare access during a campaign overshadowed by the COVID-19 pandemic. Lynch, who remains one of only three Democrats in the House who voted against the Affordable Care Act in 2009, advocates reforming the current market-based healthcare system. In the context of nationwide protests against police brutality and killing of unarmed black citizens, Lynch stated his support for efforts to modify qualified immunity for police officers, while Goldstein advocated ending qualified immunity outright.

Goldstein's campaign also highlighted differences between the two candidates on LGBTQ issues and reproductive rights. In the past, Lynch has identified as pro-life, a position he now deems too extreme.

Several Democratic primary challengers over the years have called Lynch too moderate to serve Massachusetts's electorate. In 2010, Lynch responded, "Calling me the least liberal member from Massachusetts is like calling me the slowest Kenyan in the Boston Marathon. It's all relative."

==== Candidates ====
===== Nominee =====
- Stephen F. Lynch, incumbent U.S. representative

===== Eliminated in primary =====
- Robbie Goldstein, infectious diseases physician at Massachusetts General Hospital

===== Withdrawn =====
- Mohammad Dar, physician (endorsed Goldstein)
- Brianna Wu, video game developer and candidate for Massachusetts's 8th congressional district in 2018

==== Endorsements ====
Robbie Goldstein

State officials

- Julian Cyr, state senator from the Cape and Islands district
- Nika Elugardo, state representative from the 15th Suffolk district

Individuals

- Shannon Liss-Riordan, labor attorney and former candidate for US Senate
- Bob Massie, co-founder of the Global Reporting Initiative, former executive director of Ceres, former president of the New Economy Coalition, ordained Episcopal minister, nominee for Lieutenant Governor of Massachusetts in 1994, candidate for the U.S. Senate in 2012, and candidate for Governor of Massachusetts in 2018
- Quentin Palfrey, lawyer and policymaker
- Andrew Yang, 2020 Democratic presidential candidate

Organizations

- Humanity Forward
- Indivisible
- Make Room
- Moms Demand Action
- Our Revolution – Massachusetts Chapter
- Peace Action
- Peace Action – Massachusetts Chapter
- Sunrise Movement – Blue Hills chapter
- Sunrise Movement – Boston chapter

==== Polling ====
Poll source	Date(s) administered	Sample size	Margin of error	Robbie Goldstein	Stephen Lynch	Undecided
Lincoln Park Strategies (Note: Poll sponsored by Goldstein's campaign)	August 8–9, 2020	1,038 (LV)	3.04%	32%	39%	29%

==== Primary results ====
Democratic primary results by municipality Lynch: 50–60%; 60–70%; 70–80%

Democratic primary results
Party	Candidate	Votes	%
Democratic	Stephen F. Lynch (incumbent)	111,542	66.4
Democratic	Robbie Goldstein	56,219	33.5
Democratic	Write-ins	222	0.1
Total votes		167,983	100.0

=== General election ===
==== Predictions ====
Source	Ranking	As of
The Cook Political Report	Safe D	July 2, 2020
Inside Elections	Safe D	June 2, 2020
Sabato's Crystal Ball	Safe D	July 2, 2020
Politico	Safe D	April 19, 2020
Daily Kos	Safe D	June 3, 2020
RCP	Safe D	June 9, 2020
Niskanen	Safe D	June 7, 2020

==== Results ====
Massachusetts's 8th congressional district, 2020
Party	Candidate	Votes	%
Democratic	Stephen F. Lynch (incumbent)	310,940	80.7
Independent	Jonathan D. Lott	72,060	18.7
Write-in		2,401	0.6
Total votes		385,401	100.0
Democratic hold			

== District 9 ==
2020 Massachusetts's 9th congressional district election
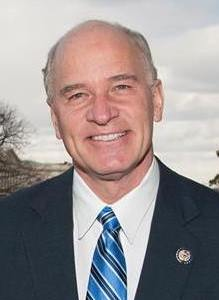

Nominee	Bill Keating	Helen Brady
Party	Democratic	Republican
Popular vote	260,262	154,261
Percentage	61.3%	36.3%
- Keating: 40–50% 50–60% 60–70% 70–80% 80–90% >90% Brady: 40–50% 50–60%
U.S. Representative before election
Bill Keating
Democratic
Elected U.S. Representative
Bill Keating
Democratic

The 9th district encompasses Cape Cod and the South Shore, and extends westward into New Bedford, part of Fall River, and surrounding suburbs. The incumbent was Democrat Bill Keating, who was reelected with 59.4% of the vote in 2018.

=== Democratic primary ===
==== Candidates ====
===== Nominee =====
- Bill Keating, incumbent U.S. representative

===== Withdrawn =====
- Mark Sylvia, former undersecretary for the Massachusetts Executive Office of Energy and Environmental Affairs

===== Declined =====
- Joe Rull, Norwell town selectman

==== Primary results ====
Democratic primary results
Party	Candidate	Votes	%
Democratic	Bill Keating (incumbent)	125,608	99.4
Democratic	Write-ins	751	0.6
Total votes		126,359	100.0

=== Republican primary ===
==== Candidates ====
===== Nominee =====
- Helen Brady, nominee for Massachusetts State Auditor in 2018

===== Primary results =====
Republican primary results
Party	Candidate	Votes	%
Republican	Helen Brady	36,238	99.0
Republican	Write-ins	378	1.0
Total votes		36,616	100.0

=== General election ===
==== Predictions ====
Source	Ranking	As of
The Cook Political Report	Safe D	July 2, 2020
Inside Elections	Safe D	June 2, 2020
Sabato's Crystal Ball	Safe D	July 2, 2020
Politico	Likely D	April 19, 2020
Daily Kos	Safe D	June 3, 2020
RCP	Safe D	June 9, 2020
Niskanen	Safe D	June 7, 2020

==== Results ====
Massachusetts's 9th congressional district, 2020
Party	Candidate	Votes	%
Democratic	Bill Keating (incumbent)	260,262	61.3
Republican	Helen Brady	154,261	36.3
Independent	Michael Manley	9,717	2.3
Write-in		361	0.1
Total votes		424,601	100.0
Democratic hold			

== See also ==
- 2020 Massachusetts general election

== Notes ==
Partisan clients
