= Boston Public Health Commission =

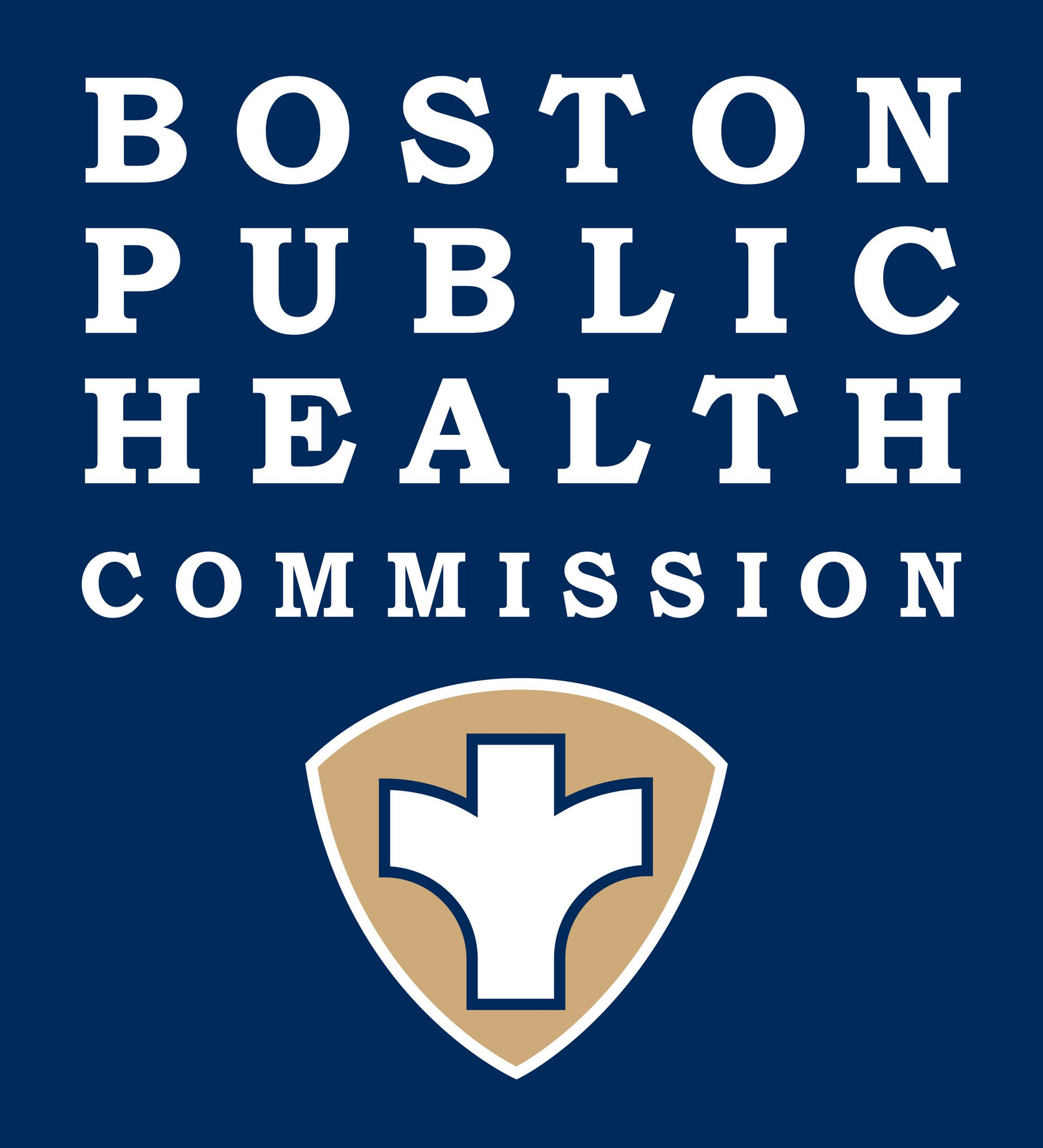
- Building a Healthy Boston

Agency overview
- Formed: 1799 as the Boston Board of Health; 1995 as the Boston Public Health Commission
- Jurisdiction: Boston
- Headquarters: 1010 Massachusetts Avenue, Boston, Massachusetts 02118
- Agency executive: Bisola Ojikutu, MD, MPH, FIDSA, Executive Director
- Parent agency: City of Boston
- Website: www.bphc.org

The Boston Public Health Commission, the oldest health department in the United States, is an independent public agency providing a wide range of health services and programs. It is governed by a seven-member board of health appointed by the Mayor of Boston. Its mission is to "protect, preserve, and promote the health and well-being of all Boston residents, particularly those who are most vulnerable." The commission is headquartered at 1010 Massachusetts Avenue in Boston.

== History ==
In 1799, The Boston Board of Health was established to combat any potential cholera outbreaks. Paul Revere was Boston's first health commissioner.

In 1864 the Boston City Hospital opened, managed by the board.

The Boston Public Health Act of 1995 caused the organization of the current commission. In 1996, the modern Boston Public Health Commission opened after the Boston City Hospital (founded 1864) and Boston University Hospital (founded 1855) were merged into the Boston Medical Center. This was the first full merger in the United States of a public hospital with a private academic medical center and its hospital.

== Tobacco Regulation ==
In 2008, the BPHC banned the sale of "blunt wraps," tobacco-leaf papers that are used to make marijuana cigarettes, in Boston. In April 2009 a Massachusetts judge upheld the ban.

== AHOPE ==
Access, Harm Reduction, Overdose Prevention and Education, commonly referred to as AHOPE Boston or AHOPE Needle Exchange, and formerly called Addicts Health Opportunity Prevention Education, is a needle exchange run by the Boston Public Health Commission.

AHOPE primarily serves homeless people with physical and mental health conditions.

=== History ===
AHOPE's programming initially operated out of an outreach van that distributed sterile syringes to people who use drugs around Boston. It was launched in 1994. In 2013, the program opened a location in the South End and saw a 300% increase in people accessing services.

In 2014, AHOPE distributed 150,000 clean needles to intravenous drug users, to prevent the transmission of HIV and hepatitis C. In 2018, according to Boston 25 News, AHOPE "distributed about 18,100 Narcan kits, receiving more than 23,000 reports of overdose reversals as a result." In 2020, despite the risks of transmission at the start of the COVID-19 pandemic, AHOPE continued to provide services to drug users, out of fear that stopping them would cause a major outbreak of HIV. In 2022, according to WGBH, AHOPE "collected nearly three times the amount of syringes" that it distributed over a period of eight months.

The program offers informational handouts, support groups, HIV testing, and individual counseling. It uses high tech drug testing services to identify the presence of xylazine, fentanyl, and other substances in street drugs. Every Thanksgiving, AHOPE hosts a dinner "for individuals struggling with homelessness and addiction" around Mass and Cass. AHOPE's offices are decorated with the obituaries of people who died as a result of drug overdose. An individual interviewed in WBUR story credited AHOPE for saving his life.

AHOPE advocates for the government to legalize supervised injection sites in Massachusetts.

==== Collaborations ====
AHOPE works closely with the Boston Public Health Commission program, Providing Access to Addictions Treatment, Hope and Support (PAATHS), to help people with substance use disorders access treatment. This collaboration gives drug users who distrust medical providers an alternative way to ask for treatment.

Access, Harm Reduction, Overdose Prevention and Education assisted Boston Healthcare for the Homeless Program (BHCHP) in their creation of a medical observation and stabilization space for intoxicated patients.

Outreach workers from AHOPE work with doctors from BHCHP on the outreach Care Zone van, funded by the Kraft Center for Community Health at Massachusetts General Hospital, to provide patients with food, wound care, physical examinations, and opioid agonist therapy. The Care Zone van works in areas of Boston that report the highest amount of overdose. EurekAlert! wrote, "By the end of 2019, the program's 24-foot mobile medical unit had recorded 9,098 contacts with people living with addiction in areas identified as overdose hot spots in and around Boston, distributing 96,600 syringes and 2,956 naloxone kits to rapidly reverse opioid overdose."

==== Honors ====
In 2018, the Boston Municipal Research Bureau honored Leroy Ivey, AHOPE's outreach coordinator, with a Henry L. Shattuck Public Service Award because Ivey "led the way in helping Boston confront the unprecedented opioid epidemic presenting itself locally."
