= Robert Truog =

American bioethicist and pediatrician

Robert D. Truog MD
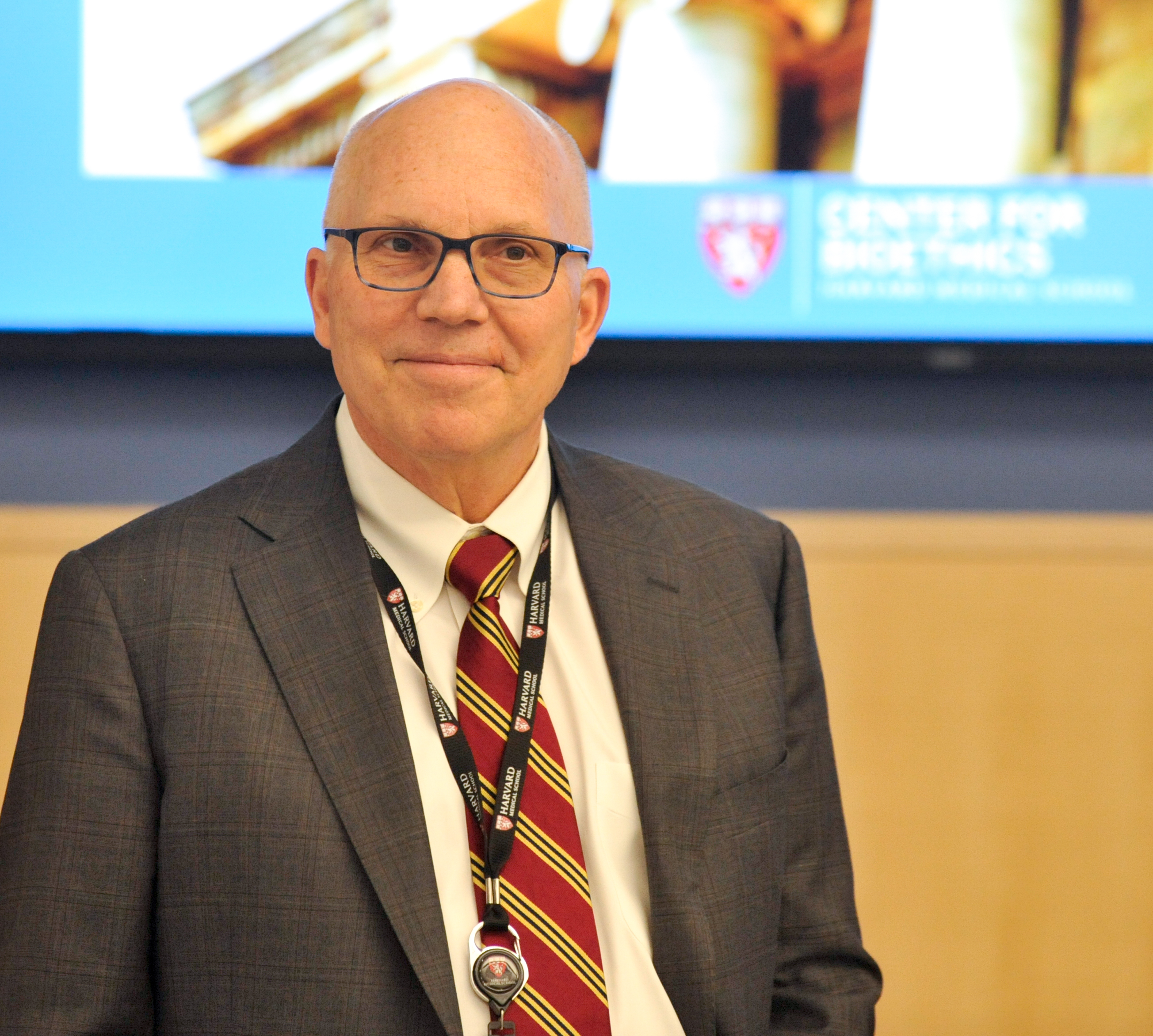
- Citizenship: USA
- Education: University of Colorado; University of California, Los Angeles
- Occupations: Physician, ethicist, educator, author
- Employer: Harvard Medical School
- Organization(s): Harvard Medical School, Boston Children's Hospital
- Known for: Director, Harvard Medical School Center for Bioethics;
- Children: 3
- Website: HMS profile page for Robert Truog, MD

Robert D. Truog is an American bioethicist and pediatrician. He is the Frances Glessner Lee Professor of Medical Ethics, Anaesthesiology & Pediatrics at Harvard Medical School, where he is also the Director of the Center for Bioethics. He also practices in the pediatric intensive care unit at Boston Children’s Hospital, where he previously served as chair of the Division of Critical Care Medicine.

== Education ==
Truog attended UCLA, where he majored in biochemistry, and continued at UCLA for his medical education, obtaining his MD degree in 1980.

He completed a residency in pediatrics at the University of Colorado, where he also served as chief resident. Here he developed a passion for the care of critically ill children. At the time, the leading pediatric intensive care units in the country were staffed by anesthesiologists, so Truog did a second residency in anesthesiology at UCLA before moving to New England to pursue advanced education in pediatric anesthesiology and critical care medicine at Boston Children’s Hospital and Harvard Medical School. Upon completing his training in 1986 he joined the faculty, where he remains as an active member of the ICU staff. He is board certified in three specialties: pediatrics, anesthesiology, and critical care medicine.

== Academic work ==
Truog has authored or coauthored more than 300 papers in bioethics and related fields, and co-authored two books. He lectures extensively both nationally and internationally. Although his writing and speaking have covered a broad range of topics in bioethics, a major focus of his work has been on definitions of death (especially “brain death”) and their relationship to organ transplantation. In collaboration with Franklin G. Miller, in 2012 he published the book “Death, Dying, and Organ Transplantation.” This critically acclaimed book examines current practices surrounding the determination of death by both neurological and circulatory criteria. The book explores the challenges posed by the “dead donor rule” (the view that vital organs may be procured only from patients who are dead), as well alternatives to the rule.

Another area of focus for Truog has been ethical aspects of disclosure of medical errors to patients and their families. Much of this work has involved conducting dozens of live workshops where clinicians are given the opportunity to practice disclosure of errors with trained actors, exploring the ethical complexity of these conversations while receiving feedback to improve their performance. Truog wrote about this work with his colleagues in a second book, Talking with Patients and Families about Medical Error: A Guide for Education and Practice,” published in 2010, translated into Italian and Japanese, and launched electronically on JHU MUSE January 1, 2012.
