= Ted Kaptchuk =

American medical academic

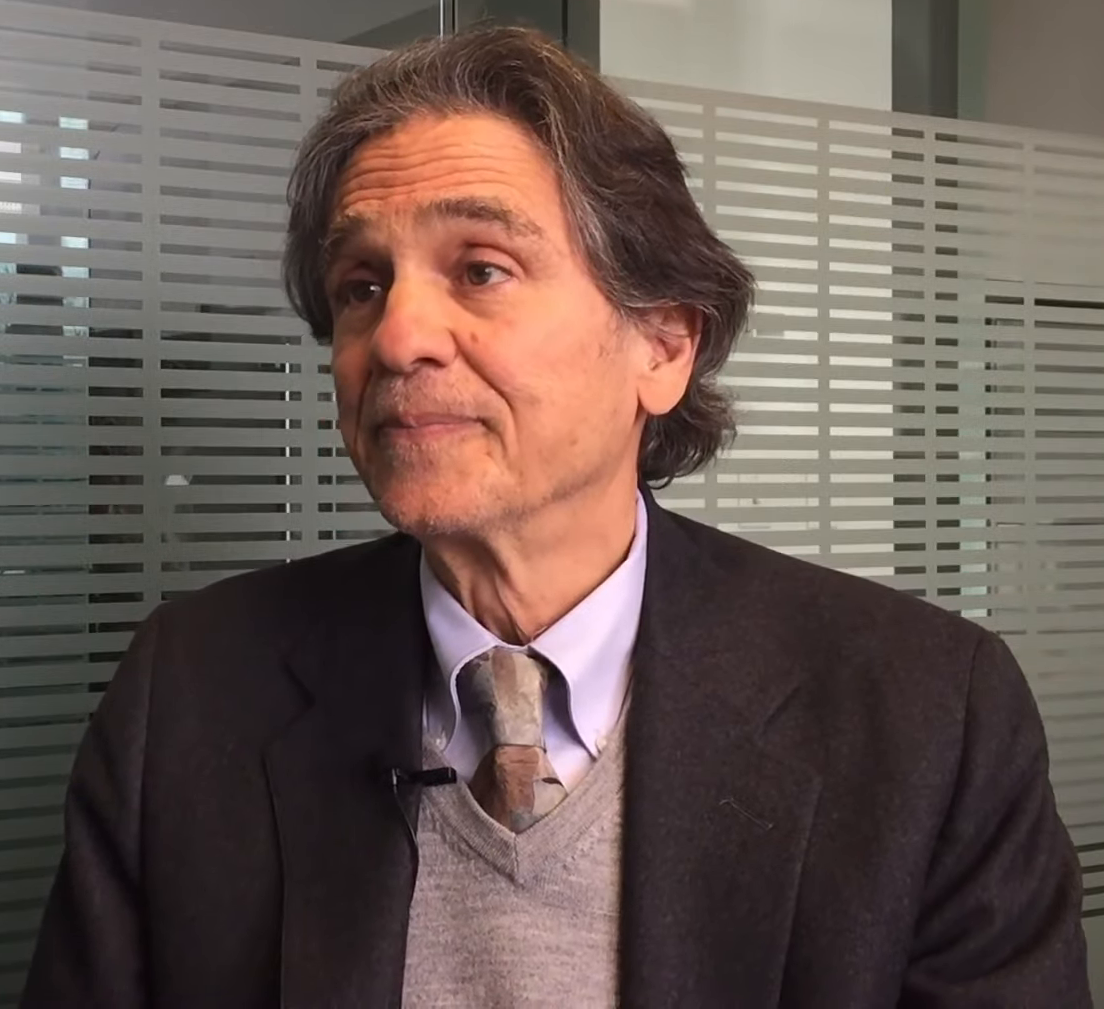
Ted Kaptchuk in an NCCIH interview about the use of placebos in research

Ted Jack Kaptchuk (born August 17, 1947) is an American medical researcher who holds professorships in medicine and in global health and social medicine at Harvard Medical School. He researches the placebo effect within the field of placebo studies.

== Early life and education ==
Kaptchuk was born in Brooklyn, New York; his parents were both Polish Holocaust survivors. He holds a B.A. in East Asian Studies from Columbia University, where he co-founded the university's chapter of Students for a Democratic Society, and has at some times claimed a degree in Traditional Chinese medicine from the Macao Institute of Chinese Medicine.

== Career ==
Kaptchuk had an herbal and acupuncture clinic in Boston for many years starting in 1976. In the 1980s he was clinical director of the Pain Unit at Lemuel Shattuck Hospital. In 1990, he became associate director of the Center for Alternative Medicine Research and Education at Beth Israel Deaconess Medical Center, also in Boston. In 2011, he became Director of the Harvard Program in Placebo Studies and the Therapeutic Encounter at Beth Israel Deaconess. Although he does not have a medical degree, he has been a faculty member at Harvard Medical School since 1998, a professor of medicine since 2013, and professor of global health and social medicine since 2015.

Working with Kathryn T. Hall and others Kaptchuk has led many studies of the placebo effect, including the role of genetic markers that identify people who respond best to placebos. Some of this work suggests that placebos may still work despite disclosure that they are placebos.

Kaptchuk has served on panels for the NIH and FDA, and worked as a medical writer for the BBC. He has written more than 300 peer-reviewed publications (h-index=100, i-index=275).

Kaptchuk has been awarded three Lifetime Achievement Awards including Society of Acupuncture in 2015, Society of Interdisciplinary Placebo Studies in 2021, and the William Silen Lifetime Achievement Award in Mentoring from Harvard Medical School in 2022.

== Personal life ==
Kaptchuk is an observant Jew.

== Books ==
- The Web That Has No Weaver: Understanding Chinese Medicine, New York: McGraw-Hill, 1983. ISBN 978-0-8092-2840-9
- The Healing Arts: Exploring the Medical Ways of the World, Summit Books, 1987. ISBN 978-0-671-64506-9
- Miller FG, Colloca L, Crouch RA, Kaptchuk TJ (eds). The Placebo: A Reader. Baltimore: Johns Hopkins University Press, 2013.

== Selected publications ==
1. All the world's a stage: including the doctor's office: National Public Radio's Hidden Brain.
2. Placebo: Can the mind cure you? https://gimletmedia.com/shows/science-vs/5whgzd/placebo-can-the-mind-cure-you
