= Natalia Linos =

Social epidemiologist

- Born: January 29, 1982 (age 44); Cleveland, Ohio, U.S.
- Education: Harvard University (BA, MS, ScD)
- Political party: Democratic
- Parents: Dimitrios Linos (father); Athina Linou (mother)
- Website: Campaign website

Natalia Linos (born January 29, 1982) is an American social epidemiologist and politician who was a candidate for Massachusetts's 4th congressional district in the 2020 election.

She is the executive director of the François-Xavier Bagnoud Center for Health and Human Rights at Harvard University and a member of the COVID-19 Health Justice Advisory Committee to the Poor People's Campaign: A National Call for a Moral Revival.

== Early life and education ==
Natalia Linos was born in Cleveland, Ohio. She is a three-time Harvard University graduate, earning her Bachelor of Arts in anthropology (2003), Master of Science in social epidemiology (2007), and Doctor of Science in social epidemiology (2012) there. She also holds a certificate in forced migration from University of Oxford's Refugee Studies Centre.

== Career ==
=== FXB Center for Health and Human Rights at Harvard University ===
Linos has been the executive director of the FXB Center for Health and Human Rights at Harvard University since September 2019. The FXB Center, hosted by the Harvard School of Public Health, is an interdisciplinary center that conducts investigations of the most serious threats to health and wellbeing globally, including poverty and homelessness, conflict and migration, racism and discrimination, and disasters. The FXB Center works closely with governments, scholars, students, the international policy community, and community groups to engage in ongoing strategic efforts to promote equity and dignity for all.

In her role, Linos has been a vocal advocate for a COVID-19 response that is centered on health equity. She has authored and been cited in a number of academic and news articles detailing the disproportionate burden of the COVID-19 pandemic on vulnerable and disadvantaged communities. She advocates for science and data-driven decision making in the evolving pandemic.

=== United Nations ===
Linos worked in the United Nations system from 2007 to 2014 and 2016 to 2019 in various roles. Most recently, she led the United Nations Development Programme's global portfolio at the intersection of health and environment, focusing on the impact of climate change on poor and marginalized communities. She has also worked on economic and social development, global health, advancing gender equality and combating violence against women.

=== New York City Health Department ===
From late 2014 to early 2016, Linos worked as a Science Advisor to the NYC Health Commissioner, within the NYC Department of Health and Mental Hygiene. There, she helped to shape strategy around several key initiatives, including ThriveNYC - the Mayor's $800 million citywide mental health initiative, and contributed to evidence-based policy-making through research and analysis and ensuring data was available to communities to help them advocate for healthier environments.

=== 2020 congressional campaign ===
In April 2020, Linos announced her candidacy for the 4th congressional district of Massachusetts. Congressman Joe Kennedy III, who previously represented the district, had announced a bid for the United States Senate, leaving the seat vacant. During the campaign, Linos touted her expertise as a public health specialist. In the September 1 Democratic primary, Linos placed fourth in a field of seven candidates.
