= Bisola Ojikutu =

American infectious disease specialist

- Born: Chicago, Illinois, U.S.
- Education: Washington University in St. Louis, Johns Hopkins University School of Medicine, Harvard School of Public Health
- Occupations: Infectious Disease Specialist, Commissioner of Public Health City of Boston, Executive Director of the Boston Public Health Commission

Bisola Ojikutu is an American physician, infectious disease specialist, public health leader and health equity researcher. In July 2021, she was appointed as the Executive Director of the Boston Public Health Commission. Ojikutu is the fifth Commissioner of Public Health for the City of Boston and the first Black woman to permanently hold this position. She currently serves on the Cabinet of Mayor Michelle Wu.

== Background ==
Ojikutu is a native of Chicago, Illinois and a graduate of Washington University in St. Louis, Johns Hopkins University School of Medicine, and Harvard School of Public Health.

After receiving her medical degree, she completed a primary care-internal medicine residency at NewYork-Presbyterian Hospital and an infectious disease fellowship at the Massachusetts General Hospital/Brigham and Women's Hospital Program. She received a master's degree in public health from the Harvard School of Public Health and is an alumna of the Commonwealth Fund/Harvard University Fellowship in Minority Health Policy. Ojikutu completed post-doctoral research training in clinical investigation funded by the National Institutes of Health.

== Career ==
Ojikutu is a board-certified physician in internal medicine and infectious diseases and a Fellow of the Infectious Disease Society of America. She currently serves as the executive director of the Boston Public Health Commission, as an Associate Professor of Medicine at Harvard Medical School, and as a faculty member within the Division of Global Health Equity at Brigham and Women's Hospital. Ojikutu practices medicine within the Infectious Disease Division at Massachusetts General Hospital. She is also an Adjunct Faculty Member at the Fenway Institute. As of December 2021, she serves as chair of Boston Mayor Michelle Wu's 17-member COVID Advisory Committee.

Previously, she was an Associate Physician in the Division of Global Health Equity and Infectious Diseases at Brigham and Women's Hospital. As a Senior Advisor and Clinical Lead at John Snow Inc, Ojikutu was the Director of a $30 million project funded by USAID that provided program management, strategic planning, and technical assistance to improve HIV care and treatment within 15 countries in sub-Saharan Africa and Latin America. As Director of South Africa Programs at Harvard Medical School, Ojikutu lived in Durban and led scale-up of Harvard Medical School's collaborative initiatives to increase HIV research and access to HIV treatment in KwaZulu Natal. Ojikutu also served as Director of the Office of International Programs at Harvard Medical School, the founding director of the Umndeni Family Care Program, an initiative designed to decrease poverty and increase access to HIV testing, care, and treatment in rural South Africa., and the inaugural Director of the Doris Duke Foundation International Research Fellowship.

Her research and writings have been featured in publications including American Journal of Public Health, New England Journal of Medicine, Harvard Health Policy Review, and the Journal of Infectious Diseases. She is the co-editor of two comprehensive textbooks detailing strategies to address the ongoing HIV epidemic with Black and Latinx communities, HIV in US Communities of Color. Ojikutu has been quoted or published as an infectious disease and public health expert in various media outlets including the New York Times, Washington Post, Rolling Stone, BBC, PBS NewsHour, CNN, USA Today, and NPR.

== Selected Awards ==
- Catalyst for Justice Award from the Massachusetts Public Health Association (2022)
- Trailblazer Award from the National Society of Black Engineers (2022)
- Named one of the 100 Most Influential Bostonians by Boston Magazine (2022)
- Named a STEM Innovator by COLOR Magazine (2022)
- Community Health Care Hero from Action for Boston Community Development (2017)
- Hero in Action award from the AIDS Action Committee of Massachusetts (2014)
